= List of least concern amphibians =

- Extinct in the wild (EW): 2 species
- Critically endangered (CR): 825 species
- Endangered (EN): 1,291 species
- Vulnerable (VU): 815 species
- Near threatened (NT): 453 species
- Least concern (LC): 3,733 species
- Data deficient (DD): 896 species
Amphibian species (IUCN, 2025-2)
- 8052 extant species have been evaluated
- 7156 of those are fully assessed (Note: excludes data deficient evaluations.)
- 4186 are not threatened at present (Note: NT and LC.)
- 2931 to 3827 are threatened (Note: Threatened comprises CR, EN and VU. Upper estimate additionally includes DD.)
- 35 to 148 are extinct or extinct in the wild:
  - 37 extinct (EX) species (Note: Chart omits extinct (EX) species)
  - 2 extinct in the wild (EW)

As of December 2025, the International Union for Conservation of Nature (IUCN) lists 3733 least concern amphibian species. 46.4% of all evaluated amphibian species are listed as least concern.

This is a complete list of least concern amphibian species as evaluated by the IUCN, last substantially updated September 2016.

== Caudata ==
Salamanders

=== Hynobiidae ===
Asiatic salamanders

- Hida salamander (Hynobius kimurae)
- Korean salamander (Hynobius leechii)
- Tohoku salamander (Hynobius lichenatus)
- Mitsyama salamander (Hynobius nebulosus)
- Japanese black salamander (Hynobius nigrescens)
- Ezo salamander (Hynobius retardatus)
- Yiwu salamander (Hynobius yiwuensis)
- Wushan salamander (Liua shihi)
- Japanese clawed salamander (Onychodactylus japonicus)
- Korean clawed salamander (Onychodactylus koreanus)
- Tohuku clawed salamander (Onychodactylus nipponoborealis)
- Siberian salamander (Salamandrella keyserlingii)
- Far East salamander (Salamandrella tridactyla)

=== Sirenidae ===
Sirens

- Southern dwarf siren (Pseudobranchus axanthus)
- Northern dwarf siren (Pseudobranchus striatus)
- Lesser siren (Siren intermedia)
- Greater siren (Siren lacertina)

=== Salamandridae ===
True salamanders and newts

- Pyrenean brook salamander (Calotriton asper)
- Corsican brook salamander (Euproctus montanus)
- Oriental fire-bellied newt (Hypselotriton orientalis)
- Bosca's newt (Lissotriton boscai)
- Greek smooth newt (Lissotriton graecus)
- Palmate newt (Lissotriton helveticus)
- Italian newt (Lissotriton italicus)
- Caucasian smooth newt (Lissotriton lantzi)
- Portuguese smooth newt (Lissotriton maltzani)
- Carpathian newt (Lissotriton montandoni)
- Schmidtler's smooth newt (Lissotriton schmidtleri)
- Smooth newt (Lissotriton vulgaris)
- Alpine newt (Mesotriton alpestris)
- Anatolia newt (Neurergus strauchii)
- Eastern newt (Notophthalmus viridescens)
- Anatolian banded newt (Ommatotriton nesterovi)
- Southern banded newt (Ommatotriton vittatus)
- Paddle-tailed newt (Pachytriton brevipes)
- Pingchi's newt (Pachytriton granulosus)
- Chinese warty newt (Paramesotriton chinensis)
- Vietnam warty newt (Paramesotriton deloustali)
- Paramesotriton wulingensis
- Algerian ribbed newt (Pleurodeles nebulosus)
- Iberian ribbed newt (Pleurodeles waltl)
- Alpine salamander (Salamandra atra)
- Corsican fire salamander (Salamandra corsica)
- Near Eastern fire salamander (Salamandra infraimmaculata)
- Spectacled salamander (Salamandrina terdigitata)
- Rough-skinned newt (Taricha granulosa)
- Sierra newt (Taricha sierra)
- Anatolian crested newt (Triturus anatolicus)
- Great crested newt (Triturus cristatus)
- Danube crested newt (Triturus dobrogicus)
- Buresch's crested newt (Triturus ivanbureschi)
- Southern crested newt (Triturus karelinii)
- Tylototriton anguliceps
- Tylototriton podichthys
- Uéno's knobby newt (Tylototriton uyenoi)

=== Ambystomatidae ===
Mole salamanders

- Ringed salamander (Ambystoma annulatum)
- Streamside salamander (Ambystoma barbouri)
- Northwestern salamander (Ambystoma gracile)
- Jefferson salamander (Ambystoma jeffersonianum)
- Blue-spotted salamander (Ambystoma laterale)
- Mabee's salamander (Ambystoma mabeei)
- Long-toed salamander (Ambystoma macrodactylum)
- Spotted salamander (Ambystoma maculatum)
- Barred tiger salamander (Ambystoma mavortium)
- Marbled salamander (Ambystoma opacum)
- Tarahumara salamander (Ambystoma rosaceum)
- Mole salamander (Ambystoma talpoideum)
- Small-mouth salamander (Ambystoma texanum)
- Eastern tiger salamander (Ambystoma tigrinum)
- Plateau tiger salamander (Ambystoma velasci)
- Idaho giant salamander (Dicamptodon aterrimus)
- Cope's giant salamander (Dicamptodon copei)
- Coastal giant salamander (Dicamptodon tenebrosus)

=== Proteidae ===
Olm, waterdogs

- Gulf Coast waterdog (Necturus beyeri)
- Neuse River waterdog (Necturus lewisi)
- Red River mudpuppy (Necturus louisianensis)
- Common mudpuppy (Necturus maculosus)
- Apalachicola waterdog (Necturus moleri)
- Escambia waterdog (Necturus mounti)
- Dwarf waterdog (Necturus punctatus)

=== Rhyacotritonidae ===
Torrent salamanders

- Southern torrent salamander (Rhyacotriton variegatus)

=== Amphiumidae ===
Amphiumas

- Two-toed amphiuma (Amphiuma means)
- One-toed amphiuma (Amphiuma pholeter)
- Three-toed amphiuma (Amphiuma tridactylum)

=== Plethodontidae ===
Lungless salamanders

- Clouded salamander (Aneides ferreus)
- Black salamander (Aneides flavipunctatus)
- Arboreal salamander (Aneides lugubris)
- Wandering salamander (Aneides vagrans)
- Tamaulipan false brook salamander (Aquiloeurycea scandens)
- California slender salamander (Batrachoseps attenuatus)
- Gabilan Mountains slender salamander (Batrachoseps gavilanensis)
- Gregarious slender salamander (Batrachoseps gregarius)
- Santa Lucia Mountains slender salamander (Batrachoseps luciae)
- Garden slender salamander (Batrachoseps major)
- Black-bellied slender salamander (Batrachoseps nigriventris)
- Channel Islands slender salamander (Batrachoseps pacificus)
- Alberch's salamander (Bolitoglossa alberchi)
- Nauta salamander (Bolitoglossa altamazonica)
- Two-lined climbing salamander (Bolitoglossa biseriata)
- Millville climbing salamander (Bolitoglossa cerroensis)
- La Loma salamander (Bolitoglossa colonnea)
- Ecuadorian climbing salamander (Bolitoglossa equatoriana)
- Paramo Frontino salamander (Bolitoglossa hypacra)
- Mexican climbing salamander (Bolitoglossa mexicana)
- Cope's climbing salamander (Bolitoglossa morio)
- San Gil climbing salamander (Bolitoglossa nicefori)
- Southern banana salamander (Bolitoglossa occidentalis)
- Robust climbing salamander (Bolitoglossa robusta)
- Northern banana salamander (Bolitoglossa rufescens)
- Cocle salamander (Bolitoglossa schizodactyla)
- Cukra climbing salamander (Bolitoglossa striatula)
- Yarumal climbing salamander (Bolitoglossa vallecula)
- Yucatán mushroomtongue salamander (Bolitoglossa yucatana)
- Apalachicola dusky salamander (Desmognathus apalachicolae)
- Southern dusky salamander (Desmognathus auriculatus)
- Ouachita dusky salamander (Desmognathus brimleyorum)
- Carolina mountain dusky salamander (Desmognathus carolinensis)
- Dusky salamander (Desmognathus fuscus)
- Shovelnose salamander (Desmognathus marmoratus)
- Seal salamander (Desmognathus monticola)
- Allegheny Mountain dusky salamander (Desmognathus ochrophaeus)
- Ocoee salamander (Desmognathus ocoee)
- Blue Ridge dusky salamander (Desmognathus orestes)
- Blackbelly salamander (Desmognathus quadramaculatus)
- Santeetlah dusky salamander (Desmognathus santeetlah)
- Black mountain salamander (Desmognathus welteri)
- Pygmy salamander (Desmognathus wrighti)
- Eschscholtz salamander (Ensatina eschscholtzii)
- Northern two-lined salamander (Eurycea bislineata)
- Southern two-lined salamander (Eurycea cirrigera)
- Three-lined salamander (Eurycea guttolineata)
- Longtail salamander (Eurycea longicauda)
- Spotted-tail salamander (Eurycea lucifuga)
- Many-ribbed salamander (Eurycea multiplicata)
- Dwarf salamander (Eurycea quadridigitata)
- Grotto salamander (Eurycea spelaea)
- Blue Ridge two-lined salamander (Eurycea wilderae)
- Spring salamander (Gyrinophilus porphyriticus)
- Four-toed salamander (Hemidactylium scutatum)
- Mount Lyell salamander (Hydromantes platycephalus)
- Korean crevice salamander (Karsenia koreana)
- Nototriton abscondens
- Allen's worm salamander (Oedipina alleni)
- Gamboa worm salamander (Oedipina complex)
- Costa Rica worm salamander (Oedipina cyclocauda)
- Central American worm salamander (Oedipina elongata)
- Oedipina pacificensis
- Colombian worm salamander (Oedipina parvipes)
- Taylor's worm salamander (Oedipina taylori)
- Western slimy salamander (Plethodon albagula)
- Ozark zigzag salamander (Plethodon angusticlavius)
- Red-backed salamander (Plethodon cinereus)
- White-spotted slimy salamander (Plethodon cylindraceus)
- Northern zigzag salamander (Plethodon dorsalis)
- Dunn's salamander (Plethodon dunni)
- Northern ravine salamander (Plethodon electromorphus)
- Northern slimy salamander (Plethodon glutinosus)
- Valley and ridge salamander (Plethodon hoffmani)
- Coeur d'Alene salamander (Plethodon idahoensis)
- Cumberland Plateau salamander (Plethodon kentucki)
- Louisiana slimy salamander (Plethodon kisatchie)
- Larch Mountain salamander (Plethodon larselli)
- Southern gray-cheeked salamander (Plethodon metcalfi)
- Northern gray-cheeked salamander (Plethodon montanus)
- Ravine salamander (Plethodon richmondi)
- Southern red-backed salamander (Plethodon serratus)
- Southern Appalachian salamander (Plethodon teyahalee)
- Van Dyke's salamander (Plethodon vandykei)
- Western redback salamander (Plethodon vehiculum)
- Southern zigzag salamander (Plethodon ventralis)
- Webster's salamander (Plethodon websteri)
- Wehrle's salamander (Plethodon wehrlei)
- Yonahlossee salamander (Plethodon yonahlossee)
- Mud salamander (Pseudotriton montanus)
- Red salamander (Pseudotriton ruber)
- Many-lined salamander (Stereochilus marginatus)
- Patch-nosed salamander (Urspelerpes brucei)

== Anura ==
Frogs

=== Leiopelmatidae ===
New Zealand primitive frogs

- Hochstetter's frog (Leiopelma hochstetteri)

=== Ascaphidae ===
Tailed frogs

- Rocky mountain tailed frog (Ascaphus montanus)
- Coastal tailed frog (Ascaphus truei)

=== Bombinatoridae ===
Flat-headed frogs, fire-bellied toads

- European fire-bellied toad (Bombina bombina)
- Yunnan firebelly toad (Bombina maxima)
- Small-webbed firebelly toad (Bombina microdeladigitora)
- Oriental fire-bellied toad (Bombina orientalis)
- Yellow-bellied toad (Bombina variegata)

=== Alytidae ===
Midwife toads, painted frogs

- Catalonian midwife toad (Alytes almogavarii)
- Iberian midwife toad (Alytes cisternasii)
- Common midwife toad (Alytes obstetricans)
- Iberian painted frog (Discoglossus galganoi)
- Painted frog (Discoglossus pictus)
- Tyrrhenian painted frog (Discoglossus sardus)
- Moroccan painted frog (Discoglossus scovazzi)

=== Pipidae ===
Clawed frogs, Surinam toads

- Congo dwarf clawed frog (Hymenochirus boettgeri)
- Western dwarf clawed frog (Hymenochirus curtipes)
- Arrabal's Suriname toad (Pipa arrabali)
- Albina Suriname toad (Pipa aspera)
- Carvalho's Suriname toad (Pipa carvalhoi)
- Sabana Suriname toad (Pipa parva)
- Common Suriname toad (Pipa pipa)
- Utinga Suriname toad (Pipa snethlageae)
- Merlin's dwarf gray frog (Pseudhymenochirus merlini)
- False Fraser's clawed frog (Xenopus allofraseri)
- Andre's clawed frog (Xenopus andrei)
- Marsabit clawed frog (Xenopus borealis)
- Eritrea clawed frog (Xenopus clivii)
- Xenopus epitropicalis
- Fischberg's clawed frog (Xenopus fischbergi)
- African clawed frog (Xenopus laevis)
- Cameroon clawed frog (Xenopus mellotropicalis)
- Müller's platanna (Xenopus muelleri)
- Upland clawed frog (Xenopus parafraseri)
- Peters' platanna (Xenopus petersii)
- Xenopus poweri
- Bouchia clawed frog (Xenopus pygmaeus)
- Western clawed frog (Xenopus tropicalis)
- Kivu clawed frog (Xenopus vestitus)
- Mwanza clawed frog (Xenopus victorianus)
- De Witte's clawed frog (Xenopus wittei)

=== Rhinophrynidae ===
Burrowing frog (single extant species)

- Mexican burrowing toad

=== Scaphiopodidae ===
American spadefoot toads

- Couch's spadefoot toad (Scaphiopus couchii)
- Eastern spadefoot (Scaphiopus holbrookii)
- Hurter's spadefoot toad (Scaphiopus hurterii)
- Plains spadefoot (Spea bombifrons)
- Great Basin spadefoot (Spea intermontana)
- Mexican spadefoot (Spea multiplicata)

=== Pelodytidae ===
Parsley frogs

- Lusitanian parsley frog (Pelodytes atlanticus)
- Caucasian parsley frog (Pelodytes caucasicus)
- Iberian parsley frog (Pelodytes ibericus)
- Common parsley frog (Pelodytes punctatus)

=== Pelobatidae ===
European spadefoot toads

- Balkan spadefoot (Pelobates balcanicus)
- Common spadefoot (Pelobates fuscus)
- Syrian spadefoot (Pelobates syriacus)
- Pallas' spadefoot toad (Pelobates vespertinus)

=== Megophryidae ===
Litter frogs

- Karin Hills frog (Brachytarsophrys carinense)
- Fea's horned frog (Brachytarsophrys feae)
- Annam spadefoot toad (Brachytarsophrys intermedius)
- Flat-headed short-legged frog
- Leptobrachella aerea
- Leptobrachella baluensis (Brachytarsophrys platyparietus)
- Dring's Asian toad (Leptobrachella dringi)
- Rosy litter frog (Leptobrachella eos)
- Leptobrachella fuliginosa
- Slender litter frog (Leptobrachella gracilis)
- White-bellied slender litter frog (Leptobrachella hamidi)
- Malaysian Asian toad (Leptobrachella heteropus)
- Dring's dwarf litter frog (Leptobrachella juliandringi)
- Kajang slender litter frog (Leptobrachella kajangensis)
- Fujian Asian toad (Leptobrachella liui)
- Mindanao litter frog (Leptobrachella lumadorum)
- Black-and-white litter toad (Leptobrachella melanoleuca)
- Leptobrachella minima
- Oshan metacarpal-tubercled toad (Leptobrachella oshanensis)
- Leptobrachella parva
- Leptobrachella picta
- Hala Bala litter toad (Leptobrachella sola)
- Leptobrachella sungi
- Leptobrachella tuberosa
- Speckle-bellied metacarpal-tubercled toad (Leptobrachella ventripunctata)
- Abbott's litter frog (Leptobrachium abbotti)
- Ailao moustache toad (Leptobrachium ailaonicum)
- Leptobrachium banae
- Leptobrachium bompu
- Chapa spadefoot toad (Leptobrachium chapaense)
- Java spadefoot toad (Leptobrachium hasseltii)
- Red-eyed spadefoot toad (Leptobrachium hendricksoni)
- Leptobrachium huashen
- Inger's little frog (Leptobrachium ingeri)
- Leptobrachium liui
- Masatakasato's eyebrow toad (Leptobrachium masatakasatoi)
- Montane litter frog (Leptobrachium montanum)
- Leptobrachium mouhoti
- Singapore spadefoot toad (Leptobrachium nigrops)
- Leptobrachium pullum
- Rakhine bicolor-eyed toadfrog (Leptobrachium rakhinense)
- Smith's litter frog (Leptobrachium smithi)
- Blue-eyed litter frog (Leptobrachium waysepuntiense)
- Merak spadefoot toad (Megophrys aceras)
- Boettger's spadefoot toad (Megophrys boettgeri)
- Rough horned frog (Megophrys edwardinae)
- Dawei eyebrow toad (Megophrys daweimontis)
- Elfin mountain toad (Megophrys elfina)
- Great piebald horned toad (Megophrys gigantica)
- Jingdong spadefoot toad (Megophrys glandulosa)
- Megophrys hansi
- Huangshan horned toad (Megophrys huangshanensis)
- Jingdong horned toad (Megophrys jingdongensis)
- Megophrys jinggangensis
- Kobayashi's horned frog (Megophrys kobayashii)
- Zhushihe mountain toad (Megophrys koui)
- Kuatun horned toad (Megophrys kuatunensis)
- Megophrys lekaguli
- Malacca spadefoot toad (Megophrys longipes)
- Major's horned toad (Megophrys major)
- Mangshan horned toad (Megophrys mangshanensis)
- Little horned toad (Megophrys minor)
- Asian spadefoot frog (Megophrys montana)
- Long-nosed horned frog (Megophrys nasuta)
- Omei horned toad (Megophrys omeimontis)
- Tonkin spadefoot toad (Megophrys palpebralespinosa)
- Megophrys parallela
- Bengal spadefoot toad (Megophrys robusta)
- Serchhip's horned toad (Megophrys serchhipii)
- Shaping horned toad (Megophrys shapingensis)
- Spiny-fingered horned toad (Megophrys spinata)
- Mindanao horned frog (Megophrys stejnegeri)
- Wushan horned toad (Megophrys wushanensis)
- Zhang's horned toad (Megophrys zhangi)
- Asian mountain toad (Ophryophryne microstoma)
- Ophryophryne pachyproctus
- Lichuan toothed toad (Oreolalax lichuanensis)
- Oreolalax major
- Oreolalax popei
- Warty toothed toad (Oreolalax rugosus)
- Oreolalax xiangchengensis
- Scutiger boulengeri
- Scutiger glandulatus
- Gongshan lazy toad (Scutiger gongshanensis)
- Tungsolo lazy toad (Scutiger mammatus)
- Scutiger ningshanensis
- Nyingchi lazy toad (Scutiger nyingchiensis)
- Ladakh pelobatid toad (Scutiger occidentalis)
- Sikkim lazy toad (Scutiger sikimmensis)

=== Eleutherodactylidae ===
Robber frogs

- Yapima shield frog (Adelophryne adiastola)
- Guiana shield frog (Adelophryne gutturosa)
- Common dink frog (Diasporus diastema)
- Diasporus gularis
- Montane dink frog (Diasporus hylaeformis)
- Diasporus quidditus
- Diasporus tinker
- Vocal dink frog (Diasporus vocator)
- Eleutherodactylus abbotti
- White-lipped chirping frog (Eleutherodactylus albolabris)
- Barahona rock frog (Eleutherodactylus alcoae)
- Red-eyed coqui (Eleutherodactylus antillensis)
- Eleutherodactylus atkinsi
- Eleutherodactylus auriculatus
- Two-lined robber frog (Eleutherodactylus bilineatus)
- Grass coqui (Eleutherodactylus brittoni)
- Whistling coqui (Eleutherodactylus cochranae)
- Common coquí (Eleutherodactylus coqui)
- Juventud robber frog (Eleutherodactylus cuneatus)
- Rio Grande chirping frog (Eleutherodactylus cystignathoides)
- Dennis' chirping frog (Eleutherodactylus dennisi)
- Guerreran peeping frog (Eleutherodactylus dilatus)
- Eleutherodactylus gossei
- Guanahacabibes frog (Eleutherodactylus guanahacabibes)
- Spotted chirping frog (Eleutherodactylus guttilatus)
- Eleutherodactylus inoptatus
- Antilles coqui (Eleutherodactylus johnstonei)
- Cliff chirping frog (Eleutherodactylus marnockii)
- Peters' shiny peeping frog (Eleutherodactylus nitidus)
- Eleutherodactylus pipilans
- Greenhouse frog (Eleutherodactylus planirostris)
- Eleutherodactylus riparius
- Piping peeping frog (Eleutherodactylus syristes)
- Eleutherodactylus varleyi
- Eleutherodactylus weinlandi
- Phyzelaphryne miriamae

=== Rhacophoridae ===
Shrub frogs

- Kajika frog (Buergeria buergeri)
- Ryukyu Kajika frog (Buergeria japonica)
- Buergeria robusta
- Doria's Asian treefrog (Chiromantis doriae)
- Chiromantis kelleri
- Chiromantis nongkhorensis
- Chiromantis petersii
- African foam-nest tree frog (Chiromantis rufescens)
- Assam Asian treefrog (Chiromantis simus)
- Grey foam-nest tree frog (Chiromantis xerampelina)
- White-eared tree frog (Feihyla kajau)
- Feihyla palpebralis
- Feihyla vittata
- Gracixalus gracilipes
- Frilled tree frog (Kurixalus appendiculatus)
- Kurixalus bisacculus
- Kurixalus eiffingeri
- Kurixalus idiootocus
- Kurixalus odontotarsus
- Kurixalus verrucosus
- Leptomantis gauni
- Leptomantis harrissoni
- Malaysian flying frog (Leptomantis rufipes)
- Java Indonesian treefrog (Nyctixalus margaritifer)
- Philautus aurifasciatus
- Borneo bubble-nest frog (Philautus hosii)
- Philautus mjobergi
- Philautus petersi
- Philautus surdus
- Perak bubble-nest frog (Philautus vermiculatus)
- Polypedates colletti
- Polypedates cruciger
- Common tree frog (Polypedates leucomystax)
- Polypedates macrotis
- Common Indian tree frog (Polypedates maculatus)
- Hong Kong whipping frog (Polypedates megacephalus)
- Polypedates mutus
- Borneo eared frog (Polypedates otilophus)
- Polypedates pseudocruciger
- Polypedates taeniatus
- Pseudophilautus abundus
- Pseudophilautus fergusonianus
- Pseudophilautus hoipolloi
- Kani bushfrog (Pseudophilautus kani)
- Pseudophilautus popularis
- Variable bushfrog (Raorchestes akroparallagi)
- Raorchestes anili
- Raorchestes annandalii
- Raorchestes beddomii
- Rhacophorus baluensis
- Rhacophorus bifasciatus
- Coonore bushfrog (Raorchestes coonoorensis)
- Raorchestes longchuanensis
- Rhacophorus nigropunctatus
- Karin bubble-nest frog (Raorchestes parvulus)
- Sacred grove bushfrog (Raorchestes sanctisilvaticus)
- Shillong bush frog (Raorchestes shillongensis)
- Rhacophorus arboreus
- Himalaya flying frog (Rhacophorus bipunctatus)
- Rhacophorus chenfui
- Blue-spotted tree frog (Rhacophorus cyanopunctatus)
- Chinese flying frog (Rhacophorus dennysi)
- Baoxing tree frog (Rhacophorus dugritei)
- Thao whipping frog (Rhacophorus feae)
- Malabar gliding frog (Rhacophorus malabaricus)
- Java flying frog (Rhacophorus margaritifer)
- Rhacophorus maximus
- Rhacophorus moltrechti
- Wallace's flying frog (Rhacophorus nigropalmatus)
- Rhacophorus omeimontis
- Orlov's treefrog (Rhacophorus orlovi)
- Rhacophorus owstoni
- Harlequin tree frog (Rhacophorus pardalis)
- Malayan flying frog (Rhacophorus prominanus)
- Reinwardti's frog (Rhacophorus reinwardtii)
- Red-webbed treefrog (Rhacophorus rhodopus)
- Rhacophorus schlegelii
- Rhacophorus suffry
- Rhacophorus viridis
- Theloderma andersoni
- Theloderma asperum
- Theloderma gordoni
- Theloderma horridum
- Theloderma leporosum
- Theloderma licin
- Cinnamon frog (Theloderma pictum)
- Theloderma rhododiscus
- Theloderma stellatum
- Zhangixalus burmanus
- Jade tree frog (Zhangixalus dulitensis)

=== Aromobatidae ===
Cryptic forest frogs

- Allobates caeruleodactylus
- Allobates carajas
- Manu rocket frog (Allobates conspicuus)
- Allobates crombiei
- Brilliant-thighed poison frog (Allobates femoralis)
- Yellow-bellied stream frog (Allobates flaviventris)
- Allobates fuscellus
- Allobates gasconi
- Black-flanked poison frog (Allobates granti)
- Allobates grillisimilis
- Allobates hodli
- Allobates insperatus
- Allobates juami
- Kinsbury's rocket frog (Allobates kingsburyi)
- Allobates magnussoni
- Dull rocket frog (Allobates marchesianus)
- Allobates masniger
- Allobates melanolaemus
- Myers' poison frog (Allobates myersi)
- Allobates nidicola
- Allobates niputidea
- Allobates nunciatus
- Allobates paleovarzensis
- Pittier's little frog (Allobates pittieri)
- Allobates subfolionidificans
- Allobates sumtuosus
- Talamanca rocket frog (Allobates talamancae)
- Allobates tapajos
- Allobates tinae
- Three-striped rocket frog (Allobates trilineatus)
- Allobates vanzolinius
- Allobates wayuu
- Sanguine poison frog (Allobates zaparo)
- Anomaloglossus baeobatrachus
- Leopard rocket frog (Anomaloglossus leopardus)
- Stephen's rocket frog (Anomaloglossus stepheni)
- Suriname rocket frog (Anomaloglossus surinamensis)
- Sapito niñera del Tamacuari (Anomaloglossus tamacuarensis)
- Anomaloglossus verbeeksnyderorum
- Anomaloglossus wothuja
- Rio rocket frog (Dryadobates olfersioides)
- Trinidad poison frog (Mannophryne trinitatis)
- Palm rocket frog (Rheobates palmatus)
- Rheobates pseudopalmatus

=== Brevicipitidae ===
Rain frogs

- Strawberry rain frog (Breviceps acutirostris)
- Breviceps adspersus
- Breviceps fichus
- Black rain frog (Breviceps fuscus)
- Mountain rain frog (Breviceps montanus)
- Mozambique rain frog (Breviceps mossambicus)
- Namaqua rain frog (Breviceps namaquensis)
- Power's rain frog (Breviceps poweri)
- Rose's rain frog (Breviceps rosei)
- Whistling rain frog (Breviceps sopranus)
- Plaintive rain frog (Breviceps verrucosus)
- Krefft's warty frog (Callulina kreffti)
- Spelaeophryne methneri

=== Bufonidae ===
True toads

- Amazophrynella bokermanni
- Amazophrynella minuta
- Asmara toad (Amietophrynus asmarae)
- Blanford's toad (Amietophrynus blanfordii)
- Dead-leaf toad (Amietophrynus brauni)
- Amietophrynus camerunensis
- Channing's toad (Amietophrynus channingi)
- Amietophrynus fuliginatus
- Amietophrynus funereus
- Amietophrynus garmani
- French Congo toad (Amietophrynus gracilipes)
- Guttural toad (Amietophrynus gutturalis)
- Nile Delta toad (Amietophrynus kassasii)
- Amietophrynus kerinyagae
- Amietophrynus kisoloensis
- High tropical forest toad (Amietophrynus latifrons)
- Amietophrynus lemairii
- Mauritanian toad (Amietophrynus mauritanicus)
- Eastern leopard toad (Amietophrynus pardalis)
- Amietophrynus poweri
- Ranger's toad (Amietophrynus rangeri)
- Amietophrynus regularis
- Amietophrynus steindachneri
- African giant toad (Amietophrynus superciliaris)
- Amietophrynus tuberosus
- Subdesert toad (Amietophrynus xeros)
- American toad (Anaxyrus americanus)
- Western toad (Anaxyrus boreas)
- Great Plains toad (Anaxyrus cognatus)
- Plateau toad (Anaxyrus compactilis)
- Anaxyrus debilis
- Fowler's toad (Anaxyrus fowleri)
- Canadian toad (Anaxyrus hemiophrys)
- Little Mexican toad (Anaxyrus kelloggi)
- Southwestern toad (Anaxyrus mexicanus)
- Arizona toad (Anaxyrus microscaphus)
- Red-spotted toad (Anaxyrus punctatus)
- Oak toad (Anaxyrus quercicus)
- Sonoran green toad (Anaxyrus retiformis)
- Texas toad (Anaxyrus speciosus)
- Southern toad (Anaxyrus terrestris)
- Woodhouse's toad (Anaxyrus woodhousii)
- White-lipped slender toad (Ansonia albomaculata)
- Kadamaian stream toad (Ansonia hanitschi)
- Ansonia leptopus
- Long-fingered slender toad (Ansonia longidigita)
- Ansonia malayana
- Ansonia minuta
- Spiny slender toad (Ansonia spinulifer)
- Brongersma's toad (Barbarophryne brongersmai)
- Bufo andrewsi
- Bufo bankorensis
- Common toad (Bufo bufo)
- Bufo cryptotympanicus
- Asiatic toad (Bufo gargarizans)
- Japanese common toad (Bufo japonicus)
- Bufo minshanicus
- Bufo pageoti
- Bufo pentoni
- Korean water toad (Bufo stejnegeri)
- Tibetan toad (Bufo tibetanus)
- Bufo tihamicus
- Japanese stream toad (Bufo torrenticola)
- Caucasian toad (Bufo verrucosissimus)
- Balearic green toad (Bufotes balearicus)
- African green toad (Bufotes boulengeri)
- Ladakh toad (Bufotes latastii)
- Lorestan toad (Bufotes luristanicus)
- Bufotes oblongus
- Xinjiang toad (Bufotes pewzowi)
- Bufotes pseudoraddei
- Bufotes siculus
- Pakistan toad (Bufotes surdus)
- Bufotes turanensis
- European green toad (Bufotes viridis)
- Baloch green toad (Bufotes zugmayeri)
- Tradouw's mountain toad (Capensibufo tradouwi)
- Dendrophryniscus berthalutzae
- Dendrophryniscus brevipollicatus
- Carvalho's tree toad (Dendrophryniscus carvalhoi)
- Dendrophryniscus leucomystax
- Dendrophryniscus proboscideus
- Arabian toad (Duttaphrynus arabicus)
- Duttaphrynus atukoralei
- Dhofar toad (Duttaphrynus dhufarensis)
- Duttaphrynus dodsoni
- Himalayan toad (Duttaphrynus himalayanus)
- Asian common toad (Duttaphrynus melanostictus)
- Duttaphrynus olivaceus
- Indian toad (Duttaphrynus parietalis)
- Duttaphrynus scaber
- Duttaphrynus stomaticus
- Stuart's toad (Duttaphrynus stuarti)
- Natterjack toad (Epidalea calamita)
- Malabar toad (Firouzophrynus hololius)
- Frostius erythrophthalmus
- Frost's toad (Frostius pernambucensis)
- Colorado River toad (Incilius alvarius)
- Incilius aucoinae
- Incilius bocourti
- Incilius campbelli
- Incilius canaliferus
- Southern roundgland toad (Incilius coccifer)
- Evergreen toad (Incilius coniferus)
- Cerro Utyum toad (Incilius epioticus)
- Jalapa toad (Incilius ibarrai)
- Yellow toad (Incilius luetkenii)
- Incilius marmoreus
- Incilius mazatlanensis
- Dark green toad (Incilius melanochlorus)
- Incilius nebulifer
- Pine toad (Incilius occidentalis)
- Confusing toad (Incilius perplexus)
- Incilius signifer
- Gulf Coast toad (Incilius valliceps)
- Crested toad (Ingerophrynus biporcatus)
- Sulawesian toad (Ingerophrynus celebensis)
- Ingerophrynus claviger
- Ingerophrynus divergens
- Bony-headed toad (Ingerophrynus galeatus)
- Ingerophrynus macrotis
- Ingerophrynus parvus
- Philippine toad (Ingerophrynus philippinicus)
- Ingerophrynus quadriporcatus
- Cross toad (Leptophryne borbonica)
- Melanophryniscus atroluteus
- Rivera redbelly toad (Melanophryniscus devincenzii)
- Melanophryniscus fulvoguttatus
- Melanophryniscus klappenbachi
- Orejas-Miranda redbelly toad (Melanophryniscus pachyrhynus)
- Melanophryniscus rubriventris
- Melanophryniscus simplex
- Melanophryniscus stelzneri
- Melanophryniscus tumifrons
- Chirinda toad (Mertensophryne anotis)
- Mertensophryne lindneri
- Mertensophryne loveridgei
- Mertensophryne melanopleura
- Mertensophryne micranotis
- Mertensophryne taitana
- Nannophryne cophotis
- Eden harbour toad (Nannophryne variegata)
- African tree toad (Nectophryne afra)
- Bates' tree toad (Nectophryne batesii)
- Tornier's tree toad (Nectophrynoides tornieri)
- Morogoro tree toad (Nectophrynoides viviparus)
- Marbled tree toad (Pedostibes rugosus)
- Malabar tree toad (Pedostibes tuberculosus)
- Pelophryne brevipes
- Günther's dwarf toad (Pelophryne guentheri)
- Short-legged dwarf toad (Pelophryne signata)
- Western giant toad (Peltophryne fustiger)
- Southern Hispaniola crestless toad (Peltophryne guentheri)
- Tschudi's Caribbean toad (Peltophryne peltocephala)
- Asian giant toad (Phrynoidis asper)
- Phrynoidis juxtaspera
- Beira toad (Poyntonophrynus beiranus)
- Dombe toad (Poyntonophrynus dombensis)
- Poyntonophrynus fenoulheti
- Poyntonophrynus hoeschi
- Poyntonophrynus kavangensis
- Poyntonophrynus lughensis
- Poyntonophrynus parkeri
- Poyntonophrynus vertebralis
- Pseudobufo subasper
- Brown tree toad (Rentapia hosii)
- Rhaebo anderssoni
- Rhaebo glaberrimus
- Smooth-sided toad (Rhaebo guttatus)
- Truando toad (Rhaebo haematiticus)
- Choco toad (Rhaebo hypomelas)
- Werner's toad (Rhaebo nasicus)
- Rhinella abei
- Rhinella achavali
- Rhinella acutirostris
- Rhinella alata
- Rhinella arenarum
- Rhinella beebei
- Rhinella bergi
- Para toad (Rhinella castaneotica)
- Rhinella ceratophrys
- Rhinella cerradensis
- Rhinella crucifer
- Rhinella dapsilis
- Cope's toad (Rhinella diptycha)
- Rhinella dorbignyi
- Rhinella fernandezae
- Valle Santiago beaked toad (Rhinella festae)
- Carabaya toad (Rhinella fissipes)
- Common lesser toad (Rhinella granulosa)
- Rhinella henseli
- Rhinella hoogmoedi
- Rhinella icterica
- Rhinella inca
- Rhinella jimi
- Peru coast toad (Rhinella limensis)
- Rhinella magnussoni
- South American common toad (Rhinella margaritifera)
- Cane toad (Rhinella marina)
- Rhinella martyi
- Rhinella ocellata
- Rhinella ornata
- Rhinella poeppigii
- Rhinella pombali
- Rhinella proboscidea
- Rhinella pygmaea
- Rhinella roqueana
- Rhinella rubescens
- Cururu toad (Rhinella schneideri)
- Rhinella scitula
- Warty toad (Rhinella spinulosa)
- Rhinella stanlaii
- Falcon toad (Rhinella sternosignata)
- Rhinella veraguensis
- Rhinella veredas
- African red toad (Schismaderma carens)
- Hallowell's toad (Sclerophrys maculata)
- Togo toad (Sclerophrys togoensis)
- Tengger desert toad (Strauchbufo raddei)
- Sand toad (Vandijkophrynus angusticeps)
- Karoo toad (Vandijkophrynus gariepensis)
- Paradise toad (Vandijkophrynus robinsoni)

=== Craugastoridae ===
Fleshbelly frogs

- Alfred's rainfrog (Craugastor alfredi)
- Barking frog (Craugastor augusti)
- Berkenbusch's robber frog (Craugastor berkenbuschii)
- Bransford's robber frog (Craugastor bransfordii)
- Craugastor chac
- Isla Bonita robber frog (Craugastor crassidigitus)
- Craugastor decoratus
- Fitzinger's robber frog (Craugastor fitzingeri)
- Gabb's dirt frog (Craugastor gabbi)
- Evergreen robber frog (Craugastor gollmeri)
- Smith's pygmy robber frog (Craugastor hobartsmithi)
- Broad-headed cave frog (Craugastor laticeps)
- Craugastor lauraster
- Montane tobber frog (Craugastor lineatus)
- Common leaf-litter frog (Craugastor loki)
- Longsnout robber frog (Craugastor longirostris)
- Craugastor megacephalus
- Black-lined robber frog (Craugastor melanostictus)
- Craugastor metriosistus
- Mexican robber frog (Craugastor mexicanus)
- Tilaran robber frog (Craugastor mimus)
- Noble's robber frog (Craugastor noblei)
- Taylor's barking frog (Craugastor occidentalis)
- Craugastor omiltemanus
- Craugastor opimus
- Similar flesh-bellied frog (Craugastor persimilis)
- Cerro Utyum robber frog (Craugastor podiciferus)
- Craugastor polyptychus
- Pygmy free-fingered frog (Craugastor pygmaeus)
- Robber frog (Craugastor raniformis)
- Polymorphic robber frog (Craugastor rhodopis)
- Veragua robber frog (Craugastor rugosus)
- Rugulose rainfrog (Craugastor rugulosus)
- Cliffy stream frog (Craugastor rupinius)
- Stejneger's robber frog (Craugastor stejnegerianus)
- Almirante robber frog (Craugastor talamancae)
- Craugastor tarahumaraensis
- Craugastor underwoodi
- Taylor's stream frog (Craugastor vocalis)
- Zúñiga’s dirt frog (Craugastor zunigai)
- Clay robber frog (Haddadus binotatus)

=== Strabomantidae ===
Cloud forest groundfrogs

- Two-lined robber frog (Bahius bilineatus)
- Barycholos pulcher
- Barycholos ternetzi
- Bryophryne bakersfield
- Bryophryne bustamantei
- Bryophryne hanssaueri
- Bryophryne nubilosus
- Bryophryne phuyuhampatu
- Brazilian guanabara frog (Euparkerella brasiliensis)
- Cochran's guanabara frog (Euparkerella cochranae)
- Three-toed guanabara frog (Euparkerella tridactyla)
- Holoaden suarezi
- Lynchius oblitus
- Lynchius tabaconas
- Narino robber frog (Nicefornia babax)
- Cuyuja robber frog (Niceforonia elassodiscus)
- Mantipus robber frog (Nicefornia mantipus)
- Black-banded robber frog (Niceforonia nigrovittata)
- Noblella carrascoicola
- Noblella chirihampatu
- Noble's pygmy frog (Noblella pygmaea)
- Noblella ritarasquinae
- Oreobates antrum
- Oreobates chiquitanus
- La Paz robber frog (Oreobates cruralis)
- Oreobates gemcare
- Oreobates granulosus
- Caceres robber frog (Oreobates heterodactylus)
- Oreobates ibischi
- Oreobates madidi
- Common big-headed frog (Oreobates quixensis)
- Oreobates sanctaecrucis
- Oreobates sanderi
- Tarapoto big-headed frog (Oreobates saxatilis)
- Phrynopus dumicola
- Phrynopus personatus
- Phrynopus tribulosus
- Phrynopus valquii
- Heyer's leaf frog (Phyllonastes heyeri)
- Loreto leaf frog (Phyllonastes myrmecoides)
- Pristimantis aaptus
- Pristimantis acatallelus
- Cachabi robber frog (Pristimantis achatinus)
- Pristimantis achuar
- Pristimantis acuminatus
- Mountain robber frog (Pristimantis altae)
- Pristimantis altamazonicus
- Pristimantis altamnis
- Pristimantis appendiculatus
- Pristimantis aquilonaris
- Pristimantis aureolineatus
- Pristimantis bellator
- Bogota robber frog (Pristimantis bogotensis)
- Boulenger's robber frog (Pristimantis boulengeri)
- Cali robber frog (Pristimantis brevifrons)
- Bromeliad robber frog (Pristimantis bromeliaceus)
- Pristimantis buccinator
- Pristimantis buckleyi
- Pristimantis cajamarcensis
- Pristimantis caprifer
- Pristimantis carvalhoi
- La Loma robber frog (Pristimantis caryophyllaceus)
- Limon robber frog (Pristimantis cerasinus)
- Pristimantis chalceus
- Charlotteville robber frog (Pristimantis charlottevillensis)
- Pristimantis chiastonotus
- Pristimantis chloronotus
- Piura robber frog (Pristimantis colodactylus)
- Condor robber frog (Pristimantis condor)
- Pristimantis conspicillatus
- Pristimantis corrugatus
- Pristimantis croceoinguinis
- Pristimantis cruciocularis
- Chiriqui robber frog (Pristimantis cruentus)
- Pristimantis curtipes
- Pristimantis danae
- Pristimantis delius
- Pristimantis dendrobatoides
- Pristimantis diadematus
- Pristimantis divnae
- Pristimantis dundeei
- Colombian robber frog (Pristimantis erythropleura)
- Pristimantis eurydactylus
- Pristimantis factiosus
- Pristimantis fenestratus
- Meta robber frog (Pristimantis frater)
- Fort Randolph robber frog (Pristimantis gaigei)
- Espada's robber frog (Pristimantis galdi)
- Pristimantis gutturalis
- Pristimantis imitatrix
- Santa Rosa robber frog (Pristimantis incomptus)
- Pristimantis inguinalis
- Pristimantis jester
- Pristimantis katoptroides
- Pristimantis kichwarum
- Pristimantis labiosus
- Pristimantis lacrimosus
- Pristimantis lanthanites
- Pristimantis latidiscus
- Pristimantis leoni
- Volcano robber frog (Pristimantis leptolophus)
- Brown-spotted robber frog (Pristimantis librarius)
- Pristimantis llojsintuta
- Pristimantis luscombei
- White-striped robber frog (Pristimantis luteolateralis)
- Pristimantis lymani
- Pristimantis lythrodes
- Pristimantis malkini
- Pristimantis marmoratus
- Pristimantis martiae
- Pristimantis medemi
- Pristimantis mendax
- Miyata's robber frog (Pristimantis miyatai)
- La Hondura robber frog (Pristimantis moro)
- Pristimantis myersi
- Pristimantis nervicus
- Pristimantis nicefori
- Tandapi robber frog (Pristimantis nyctophylax)
- Paramos robber frog (Pristimantis obmutescens)
- Carabaya robber frog (Pristimantis ockendeni)
- Pristimantis orcesi
- Pristimantis orcus
- Pristimantis paisa
- Palmer's robber frog (Pristimantis palmeri)
- Leopard robber frog (Pristimantis pardalis)
- Pristimantis parvillus
- Pristimantis paulodutrai
- Pristimantis paululus
- Pristimantis penelopus
- Tenerife robber frog (Pristimantis peraticus)
- Pristimantis percnopterus
- Pristimantis permixtus
- Pristimantis peruvianus
- Pristimantis phoxocephalus
- Pristimantis piceus
- Pristimantis platydactylus
- Hidden robber frog (Pristimantis prolatus)
- Pristimantis pseudoacuminatus
- Pristimantis pulvinatus
- Pristimantis quaquaversus
- Las Hermosas robber frog (Pristimantis racemus)
- Pristimantis ramagii
- Pristimantis restrepoi
- Pristimantis rhabdolaemus
- Pristimantis rhodostichus
- Rio San Juan robber frog (Pristimantis ridens)
- Andagoya robber frog (Pristimantis roseus)
- Pristimantis saltissimus
- Pristimantis samaipatae
- Manu robber frog (Pristimantis skydmainos)
- Pristimantis subsigillatus
- Banded robber frog (Pristimantis taeniatus)
- Pristimantis terraebolivaris
- Northern Cordilleras robber frog (Pristimantis thectopternus)
- Pristimantis thymelensis
- Pristimantis toftae
- Pristimantis unistrigatus
- Caldas robber frog (Pristimantis uranobates)
- Pristimantis urichi
- Pristimantis variabilis
- Pristimantis ventrimarmoratus
- Loja robber frog (Pristimantis versicolor)
- Pristimantis viejas
- Pristimantis vilarsi
- Pristimantis vinhai
- Pristimantis w-nigrum
- Pristimantis walkeri
- Waorani robber frog (Pristimantis waoranii)
- Pristimantis yukpa
- Pristimantis zeuctotylus
- Zimmerman's robber frog (Pristimantis zimmermanae)
- Qosqophryne gymnotis
- Strabomantis biporcatus
- Naruta robber frog (Strabomantis sulcatus)
- Danubio robber frog (Strabomantis zygodactylus)
- Tachiramantis prolixodiscus

=== Centrolenidae ===
Glass frogs

- Alban cochran frog (Centrolene daidalea)
- Eastern giant glass frog (Centrolene hybrida)
- Centrolene notostictum
- Tandapi giant glass frog (Centrolene peristicta)
- Centrolene robledoi
- Savage's cochran frog (Centrolene savagei)
- Centrolene venezuelense
- María Elena's glass frog (Chimerella mariaelenae)
- San Jose cochran frog (Cochranella euknemos)
- Grainy cochran frog (Cochranella granulosa)
- Cochranella nola
- Cochranella resplendens
- Andes giant glass frog (Espadarana andina)
- Napo giant glass frog (Espadarana audax)
- Espadarana durrellorum
- Nicaragua giant glass frog (Espadarana prosoblepon)
- Atrato glass frog (Hyalinobatrachium aureoguttatum)
- Hyalinobatrachium bergeri
- Banded-limb glassfrog (Hyalinobatrachium cappellei)
- Suretka glass frog (Hyalinobatrachium chirripoi)
- Bare-hearted glass frog (Hyalinobatrachium colymbiphyllum)
- Hyalinobatrachium crurifasciatum
- Fleischmann's glass frog (Hyalinobatrachium fleischmanni)
- Yuruani glass frog (Hyalinobatrachium iaspidiense)
- Hyalinobatrachium ibama
- Hyalinobatrachium mondolfii
- Hyalinobatrachium munozorum
- Hyalinobatrachium nouraguense
- Hyalinobatrachium ruedai
- Talamanca glass frog (Hyalinobatrachium talamancae)
- Hyalinobatrachium tatayoi
- Hyalinobatrachium taylori
- La Palma glass frog (Hyalinobatrachium valerioi)
- Bolivian cochran frog (Nymphargus bejaranoi)
- Cochran frog (Nymphargus cochranae)
- Nymphargus grandisonae
- Ecuador cochran frog (Nymphargus griffithsi)
- Lynch's cochran frog (Nymphargus ignotus)
- Maria's giant glass frog (Nymphargus mariae)
- Nymphargus posadae
- Rulyrana flavopunctata
- White-spotted cochran frog (Sachatamia albomaculata)
- Limon giant glass frog (Sachatamia ilex)
- Teratohyla adenocheira
- Teratohyla midas
- Powdered glass frog (Teratohyla pulverata)
- Spiny cochran frog (Teratohyla spinosa)
- Vitreorana eurygnatha
- Bolivar giant glass frog (Vitreorana gorzulae)
- Rita's glassfrog (Vitreorana ritae)
- Vitreorana uranoscopa

=== Arthroleptidae ===
Screeching frogs

- Arthroleptis adelphus
- Rugege Forest squeaker (Arthroleptis adolfifriederici)
- Arthroleptis affinis
- Ruo river screeching frog (Arthroleptis francei)
- Arthroleptis lameerei
- Problem squeaker frog (Arthroleptis palava)
- Arthroleptis poecilonotus
- Arthroleptis pyrrhoscelis
- Poroto screeching frog (Arthroleptis reichei)
- Schubotz's squeaker (Arthroleptis schubotzi)
- Common squeaker (Arthroleptis stenodactylus)
- Arthroleptis sylvaticus
- Arthroleptis taeniatus
- Buea screeching frog (Arthroleptis variabilis)
- Bush squeaker (Arthroleptis wahlbergii)
- Marimba screeching frog (Arthroleptis xenochirus)
- Dwarf squeaker (Arthroleptis xenodactyloides)
- Benito river night frog (Astylosternus batesi)
- Astylosternus occidentalis
- Cardioglossa elegans
- Cardioglossa escalerae
- Cardioglossa gracilis
- Cardioglossa gratiosa
- Cardioglossa leucomystax
- Cameroon egg frog (Leptodactylodon ovatus)
- Anchieta's tree frog (Leptopelis anchietae)
- Glade tree frog (Leptopelis argenteus)
- Gaboon forest tree frog (Leptopelis aubryi)
- Bocage's tree frog (Leptopelis bocagii)
- Victoria Forest tree frog (Leptopelis boulengeri)
- Cameroon forest tree frog (Leptopelis brevirostris)
- Savannah forest tree frog (Leptopelis bufonides)
- Efulen forest tree frog (Leptopelis calcaratus)
- Christy's tree frog (Leptopelis christyi)
- Witu forest tree frog (Leptopelis concolor)
- Angola forest tree frog (Leptopelis cynnamomeus)
- Yellow-spotted tree frog (Leptopelis flavomaculatus)
- Badditu forest tree frog (Leptopelis gramineus)
- Kisenyi forest tree frog (Leptopelis kivuensis)
- Niger forest tree frog (Leptopelis millsoni)
- Modest forest tree frog (Leptopelis modestus)
- Mossambique forest tree frog (Leptopelis mossambicus)
- Natal forest tree frog (Leptopelis natalensis)
- West Cameroon forest tree frog (Leptopelis nordequatorialis)
- Common forest tree frog (Leptopelis notatus)
- Ocellated forest tree frog (Leptopelis ocellatus)
- Kala forest tree frog (Leptopelis omissus)
- Garamba forest tree frog (Leptopelis oryi)
- Lake Upemba forest tree frog (Leptopelis parbocagii)
- Red tree frog (Leptopelis rufus)
- Leptopelis spiritusnoctis
- Dime forest tree frog (Leptopelis vannutellii)
- Leptopelis viridis
- Leptopelis zebra
- Nyctibates corrugatus
- Gaboon forest frog (Scotobleps gabonicus)
- Hairy frog (Trichobatrachus robustus)

=== Hemiphractidae ===
Marsupial frogs, horned treefrogs, backpack frogs, and allies

- Fuhrmann's backpack frog (Cryptobatrachus fuhrmanni)
- Mount Tucuche tree frog (Flectonotus fitzgeraldi)
- Flectonotus pygmaeus
- Fritziana fissilis
- Fritziana goeldii
- Fritziana ohausi
- Gastrotheca albolineata
- Andes marsupial frog (Gastrotheca andaquiensis)
- Gastrotheca aratia
- Popayan marsupial frog (Gastrotheca argenteovirens)
- Dunn's marsupial frog (Gastrotheca dunni)
- Gastrotheca ernestoi
- Gastrotheca fissipes
- Gastrotheca fulvorufa
- Gastrotheca griswoldi
- Pastaza marsupial frog (Gastrotheca longipes)
- Common marsupial frog (Gastrotheca marsupiata)
- Gastrotheca microdiscus
- Mountain marsupial frog (Gastrotheca monticola)
- Niceforo's marsupial frog (Gastrotheca nicefori)
- Peru marsupial frog (Gastrotheca peruana)
- Gastrotheca piperata
- Gastrotheca pulchra
- Espada's marsupial frog (Gastrotheca testudinea)
- Cusco triangular-headed frog (Hemiphractus helioi)
- Sumaco horned treefrog (Hemiphractus proboscideus)
- Spix's horned treefrog (Hemiphractus scutatus)
- Stefania neblinae
- Stefania scalae

=== Cycloramphidae ===
Button frogs and allies

- Cycloramphus acangatan
- Blumenau button frog (Cycloramphus bolitoglossus)
- Boraceia button frog (Cycloramphus boraceiensis)
- Carvalho's bug-eyed frog (Cycloramphus carvalhoi)
- Sao Paulo button frog (Cycloramphus dubius)
- Alto button frog (Cycloramphus eleutherodactylus)
- Tschudi's button frog (Cycloramphus fuliginosus)
- Rio Verde button frog (Cycloramphus juimirim)
- Lutz's button frog (Cycloramphus lutzorum)
- Miguel's button frog (Cycloramphus migueli)
- Miranda's button frog (Cycloramphus mirandaribeiroi)
- Girard's frog (Cycloramphus parvulus)
- Cycloramphus rhyakonastes
- Thoropa bryomantis
- Big-eared river frog (Thoropa megatympanum)
- Military button frog (Thoropa miliaris)
- Brazilian river frog (Thoropa saxatilis)
- Thoropa taophora

=== Dendrobatidae ===
Poison dart frogs

- Brazil-nut poison frog (Adelphobates castaneoticus)
- Adelphobates galactonotus
- Adelphobates quinquevittatus
- Ameerega berohoka
- Ecuador poison frog (Ameerega bilinguis)
- Ameerega boliviana
- Ameerega braccata
- Lutz's poison frog (Ameerega flavopicta)
- Ameerega hahneli
- Manú poison frog (Ameerega macero)
- Ameerega parvula
- Peru poison frog (Ameerega petersi)
- Spot-legged poison frog (Ameerega picta)
- Beautiful-breasted poison frog (Ameerega pulchripecta)
- Ameerega simulans
- Three-striped arrow-poison frog (Ameerega trivittata)
- Ameerega yungicola
- Yellow-bellied poison frog (Andinobates fulguritus)
- Blue-bellied poison frog (Andinobates minutus)
- Imaza rocket frog (Colostethus argyrogaster)
- Colostethus inguinalis
- Common rocket frog (Colostethus panamansis)
- Pratt's rocket frog (Colostethus pratti)
- Colostethus ucumari
- Green and black poison dart frog (Dendrobates auratus)
- Yellow-banded poison dart frog (Dendrobates leucomelas)
- Dyeing dart frog (Dendrobates tinctorius)
- Yellow-striped poison frog (Dendrobates truncatus)
- Marbled poison frog (Epipedobates boulengeri)
- Epipedobates machalilla
- Rio Santiago poison frog (Excidobates captivus)
- Bello rocket frog (Hyloxalus abditaurantius)
- Hyloxalus awa
- Hyloxalus bocagei
- Loja rocket frog (Hyloxalus elachyhistus)
- Hyloxalus littoralis
- Los Tayos rocket frog (Hyloxalus nexipus)
- Hyloxalus peruvianus
- Hyloxalus sauli
- Cream-backed poison frog (Hyloxalus subpunctatus)
- Santa Rita rocket frog (Leucostethus fraterdanieli)
- Harlequin poison frog (Oophaga histrionica)
- Strawberry poison-dart frog (Oophaga pumilio)
- Kokoe poison frog (Phyllobates aurotaenia)
- Lovely poison frog (Phyllobates lugubris)
- Ranitomeya amazonica
- Ranitomeya flavovittata
- Mimic poison frog (Ranitomeya imitator)
- Red-backed poison frog (Ranitomeya reticulata)
- Sira poison dart frog (Ranitomeya sirensis)
- Amazonian poison frog (Ranitomeya ventrimaculata)
- Ranitomeya uakarii
- Brazilian poison frog (Ranitomeya vanzolinii)
- Zimmermann's poison frog (Ranitomeya variabilis)
- Reticulated poison frog (Ranitomeya ventrimaculata)
- Rainforest rocket frog (Silverstoneia flotator)

=== Mantellidae ===
Mantellid frogs

- Aglyptodactylus inguinalis
- Madagascar jumping frog (Aglyptodactylus madagascariensis)
- Aglyptodactylus securifer
- Blommersia angolafa
- Mantidactylus blommersae (Blommersia blommersae)
- Blommersia dejongi
- Domergue's Madagascar frog (Blommersia domerguei)
- Blommersia galani
- Ambrana Madagascar frog (Blommersia grandisonae)
- Blommersia kely
- Blommersia sarotra
- Blommersia variabilis
- Witte's Madagascar frog (Blommersia wittei)
- White-lipped bright-eyed frog (Boophis albilabris)
- Spotted bright-eyed frog (Boophis albipunctatus)
- Boophis ankaratra
- Boophis axelmeyeri
- Boophis bottae
- Boophis calcaratus
- Boophis doulioti
- Boophis entingae
- Forest bright-eyed frog (Boophis erythrodactylus)
- Goudot's bright-eyed frog (Boophis goudotii)
- Warty bright-eyed frog (Boophis guibei)
- Ida's bright-eyed frog (Boophis idae)
- Boophis lichenoides
- Boophis luciae
- Ankafana bright-eyed frog (Boophis luteus)
- Madagascar bright-eyed frog (Boophis madagascariensis)
- Boophis marojezensis
- Imerina bright-eyed frog (Boophis microtympanum)
- Boophis occidentalis
- Eastern bright-eyed frog (Boophis opisthodon)
- Moramanga bright-eyed frog (Boophis pauliani)
- Boophis picturatus
- Boophis pyrrhus
- Central bright-eyed frog (Boophis rappiodes)
- Reticulate bright-eyed frog (Boophis reticulatus)
- Boophis roseipalmatus
- Boophis septentrionalis
- Boophis sibilans
- Boophis tampoka
- Boophis tasymena
- Dumeril's bright-eyed frog (Boophis tephraeomystax)
- Green bright-eyed frog (Boophis viridis)
- Boophis xerophilus
- East Betsileo Madagascar frog (Gephyromantis asper)
- Boulenger's Madagascar frog (Gephyromantis boulengeri)
- Grainy Madagascar frog (Gephyromantis granulatus)
- White-spotted Madagascar frog (Gephyromantis leucomaculatus)
- White Madagascar frog (Gephyromantis luteus)
- Malasay grainy frog (Gephyromantis malagasius)
- Gephyromantis moseri
- Common Madagascar frog (Gephyromantis plicifer)
- Massif Madagascar frog (Gephyromantis pseudoasper)
- Gephyromantis redimitus
- Gephyromantis sculpturatus
- Gephyromantis tschenki
- Brown grainy frog (Gephyromantis ventrimaculatus)
- Gephyromantis verrucosus
- White-lined Madagascar frog (Guibemantis albolineatus)
- Sainte Marie Madagascar frog (Guibemantis bicalcaratus)
- Pulsing Madagascar frog (Guibemantis depressiceps)
- Blommers' Madagascar frog (Guibemantis flavobrunneus)
- Free Madagascar frog (Guibemantis liber)
- Guibemantis methueni
- Tsarafidy Madagascar frog (Guibemantis pulcher)
- Guibemantis timidus
- Guibemantis tornieri
- Madagascar bullfrog (Laliostoma labrosum)
- Baron's mantella (Mantella baroni)
- Brown mantella (Mantella betsileo)
- Mantella ebenaui
- Climbing mantella (Mantella laevigata)
- Guibé's mantella (Mantella nigricans)
- Andrangoloaka Madagascar frog (Mantidactylus aerumnalis)
- Mountain Madagascar frog (Mantidactylus alutus)
- Mantidactylus ambreensis
- Folohy Madagascar frog (Mantidactylus argenteus)
- Mantidactylus bellyi
- Betsileo Madagascar frog (Mantidactylus betsileanus)
- Two-pore Madagascar frog (Mantidactylus biporus)
- Mantidactylus brevipalmatus
- Mantidactylus charlotteae
- Ankafana Madagascar frog (Mantidactylus curtus)
- Fort Madagascar frog (Mantidactylus femoralis)
- Grandidier's Madagascar frog (Mantidactylus grandidieri)
- Gray Madagascar frog (Mantidactylus guttulatus)
- Dumeril's Madagascar frog (Mantidactylus lugubris)
- Ivohimanita Madagascar frog (Mantidactylus majori)
- Mantidactylus melanopleura
- Mocquard's Madagascar frog (Mantidactylus mocquardi)
- Central Madagascar frog (Mantidactylus opiparis)
- Warty Madagascar frog (Mantidactylus ulcerosus)
- Mantidactylus zipperi
- Anamalozoatra Madagascar frog (Spinomantis aglavei)
- Spinomantis fimbriatus
- Peracca's Madagascar frog (Spinomantis peraccae)
- Spinomantis phantasticus

=== Ceratobatrachidae ===
Wrinkled ground frogs and allies

- Balu eastern frog (Alcalus baluensis)
- Tasan eastern frog (Alcalus tasanae)
- Bougainville wrinkled ground frog (Cornufer acrochordus)
- Torokina wrinkled ground frog (Cornufer aculeodactylus)
- Cornufer admiraltiensis
- Pomugu wrinkled ground frog (Cornufer akarithymus)
- Batanta wrinkled ground frog (Cornufer batantae)
- Boulenger's wrinkled ground frog (Cornufer boulengeri)
- Cornufer browni
- Treasury Island webbed frog (Cornufer bufoniformis)
- Cornufer cryptotis
- Cornufer custos
- Elegant sticky-toed frog (Cornufer elegans)
- Cornufer exedrus
- Guenther's triangle frog (Cornufer guentheri)
- Shortland Island webbed frog (Cornufer guppyi)
- Solomon Islands giant treefrog (Cornufer hedigeri)
- Solomon Island palm frog (Cornufer heffernani)
- Cornufer latro
- Aresi wrinkled ground frog (Cornufer macrops)
- Ti wrinkled ground frog (Cornufer macrosceles)
- Kavieng wrinkled ground frog (Cornufer magnus)
- Malukuna webbed frog (Cornufer malukuna)
- Cornufer mamusiorum
- Cornufer manus
- Buka sticky-toed frog (Cornufer mediodiscus)
- Mountain sticky-toed frog (Cornufer montanus)
- Myers' wrinkled ground frog (Cornufer myersi)
- Cornufer nakanaiorum
- Necker's wrinkled ground frog (Cornufer neckeri)
- Faro webbed frog (Cornufer opisthodon)
- Papua wrinkled ground frog (Cornufer papuensis)
- Palau wrinkled ground frog (Cornufer pelewensis)
- Dotted wrinkled ground frog (Cornufer punctatus)
- Schmidt's wrinkled ground frog (Cornufer schmidti)
- Solomon Islands giant treefrog (Cornufer solomonis)
- Torakina sticky-toed frog (Cornufer trossulus)
- Fauro sticky-toed frog (Cornufer vertebralis)
- Admiralty Island webbed frog (Cornufer vogti)
- Weber's wrinkled ground frog (Cornufer weberi)
- Medog papilla-tongued frog (Liurana medogensis)
- Horned wrinkled ground frog (Platymantis cornutus)
- Platymantis corrugatus
- Dumeril's wrinkled ground frog (Platymantis dorsalis)
- Gunther's wrinkled ground frog (Platymantis guentheri)
- Platymantis isarog
- Platymantis mimulus
- Polillo wrinkled ground frog (Platymantis polillensis)
- Platymantis pygmaeus
- Rabori's forest frog (Platymantis rabori)

=== Dicroglossidae ===
Fork-tongued frogs

- Kashmir paa frog (Allopaa hazarensis)
- Chrysopaa sternosignata
- Euphlyctis cyanophlyctis
- Euphlyctis ehrenbergii
- Indian green frog (Euphlyctis hexadactylus)
- Andaman wart frog (Fejervarya andamanensis)
- Java wart frog (Fejervarya cancrivora)
- Fejervarya iskandari
- Kerala warty frog (Fejervarya keralensis)
- Fejervarya kirtisinghei
- Asian grass frog (Fejervarya limnocharis)
- Crab-eating frog (Fejervarya moodiei)
- Hong Kong rice frog
- Nepal wart frog (Fejervarya nepalensis)
- Orissa frog (Fejervarya orissaensis)
- Pierre's wart frog (Fejervarya pierrei)
- Malabar wart frog (Fejervarya rufescens)
- Bombay wart frog (Fejervarya syhadrensis)
- Terai wart frog (Fejervarya teraiensis)
- Fejervarya verruculosa
- Luzon wart frog (Fejervarya vittigera)
- Jerdon's bullfrog (Hoplobatrachus crassus)
- Crowned bullfrog (Hoplobatrachus occipitalis)
- Chinese edible frog (Hoplobatrachus rugulosus)
- Indian bullfrog (Hoplobatrachus tigerinus)
- Ingerana tenasserimensis
- Limnonectes asperatus
- Blyth's river frog (Limnonectes blythii)
- Dammerman's wart frog (Limnonectes dammermani)
- Finch's wart frog (Limnonectes finchi)
- Limnonectes fujianensis
- Limnonectes grunniens
- Gyldenstolpe's frog (Limnonectes gyldenstolpei)
- Limnonectes hascheanus
- Limnonectes kadarsani
- Khasi wart frog (Limnonectes khasianus)
- Koh Chang frog (Limnonectes kohchangae)
- Kuhl's creek frog (Limnonectes kuhlii)
- Corrugated frog (Limnonectes laticeps)
- Giant river frog (Limnonectes leporinus)
- Small disked frog (Limnonectes leytensis)
- Limnonectes microdiscus
- Limnonectes modestus
- Limnonectes palavanensis
- Limnonectes plicatellus
- Limnonectes poilani
- Shompen frog (Limnonectes shompenorum)
- Woodworth's frog (Limnonectes woodworthi)
- Mysore frog (Minervarya mysorensis)
- Nanorana blanfordii
- Nanorana liebigii
- Nanorana parkeri
- Nanorana polunini
- Nanorana ventripunctata
- Nanorana vicina
- Seep frog (Occidozyga baluensis)
- Sulawesian puddle frog (Occidozyga celebensis)
- Common puddle frog (Occidozyga laevis)
- Green puddle frog (Occidozyga lima)
- Occidozyga magnapustulosa
- Round-tongued floating frog (Occidozyga martensii)
- Occidozyga semipalmata
- Sumatran puddle frog (Occidozyga sumatrana)
- Ombrana sikimensis
- Quasipaa verrucospinosa
- Indian burrowing frog (Sphaerotheca breviceps)
- Sphaerotheca dobsonii
- Sphaerotheca maskeyi
- Sphaerotheca rolandae

=== Microhylidae ===
Narrow-mouthed frogs

- Neblina frog (Adelastes hylonomos)
- Aphantophryne pansa
- Arcovomer passarellii
- Asterophrys turpicola
- Northern Territory frog (Austrochaperina adelphe)
- Austrochaperina basipalmata
- Austrochaperina blumi
- Fry's frog (Austrochaperina fryi)
- Slender frog (Austrochaperina gracilipes)
- Austrochaperina hooglandi
- Austrochaperina macrorhyncha
- Austrochaperina palmipes
- Rain frog (Austrochaperina pluvialis)
- Robust frog (Austrochaperina robusta)
- Barygenys atra
- Barygenys exsul
- Barygenys nana
- Callulops comptus
- Callulops doriae
- Callulops humicola
- Callulops personatus
- Callulops robustus
- Callulops stictogaster
- Callulops wilhelmanus
- Chaperina fusca
- Chiasmocleis albopunctata
- Chiasmocleis anatipes
- Chiasmocleis antenori
- Chiasmocleis atlantica
- Chiasmocleis avilapiresae
- Chiasmocleis bassleri
- Chiasmocleis capixaba
- Carvalho's silent frog (Chiasmocleis carvalhoi)
- Chiasmocleis cordeiroi
- Chiasmocleis crucis
- Chiasmocleis gnoma
- Chiasmocleis hudsoni
- Chiasmocleis jimi
- Central humming frog (Chiasmocleis lacrimae)
- Chiasmocleis leucosticta
- Chiasmocleis mantiqueira
- Chiasmocleis mehelyi
- Chiasmocleis schubarti
- Chiasmocleis shudikarensis
- Chiasmocleis tridactyla
- Chiasmocleis ventrimaculata
- Choerophryne brunhildae
- Choerophryne darlingtoni
- Choerophryne proboscidea
- Choerophryne rostellifer
- Choerophryne swanhildae
- Choerophryne tubercula
- Choerophryne valkuriarum
- Cophixalus biroi
- Cophixalus cheesmanae
- Hosmer's frog (Cophixalus hosmeri)
- Cophixalus humicola
- Inelegant frog (Cophixalus infacetus)
- Cophixalus ornatus
- Cophixalus parkeri
- Cophixalus pipilans
- Cophixalus riparius
- Cophixalus shellyi
- Cophixalus sphagnicola
- Cophixalus variabilis
- Cophixalus verrucosus
- Zweifel's frog (Cophixalus zweifeli)
- Whistling treefrog (Cophyla phyllodactyla)
- Copiula alpestris
- Copiula derongo
- Copiula fistulans
- Copiula guttata
- Copiula oxyrhina
- Copiula rivularis
- Copiula tyleri
- Ctenophryne aequatorialis
- Costa Rica Nelson frog (Ctenophryne aterrima)
- Ctenophryne geayi
- Dermatonotus muelleri
- Sambava tomato frog (Dyscophus guineti)
- Antsouhy tomato frog (Dyscophus insularis)
- Elachistocleis bicolor
- Elachistocleis bumbameuboi
- Elachistocleis helianneae
- Elachistocleis magna
- Elachistocleis ovalis
- Panama humming frog (Elachistocleis panamensis)
- Elachistocleis pearsei
- Elachistocleis piauiensis
- Elachistocleis surinamensis
- Elachistocleis surumu
- Eastern narrow-mouthed toad (Gastrophryne carolinensis)
- Elegant narrow-mouthed toad (Gastrophryne elegans)
- Great Plains narrow-mouthed toad (Gastrophryne olivacea)
- Genyophryne thomsoni
- Burmese squat frog (Glyphoglossus guttulatus)
- Glyphoglossus yunnanensis
- Hamptophryne alios
- Amazon sheep frog (Hamptophryne boliviana)
- Hylophorbus rufescens
- Nicaragua narrowmouth toad (Hypopachus pictiventris)
- Two-spaded narrow-mouthed toad (Hypopachus ustus)
- Mexican narrow-mouthed toad (Hypopachus variolosus)
- Kalophrynus heterochirus
- Kalophrynus interlineatus
- Orange sticky frog (Kalophrynus orangensis)
- Black-spotted sticky frog (Kalophrynus pleurostigma)
- Assamese balloon frog (Kaloula assamensis)
- Brown bullfrog (Kaloula baleata)
- Boreal digging frog (Kaloula borealis)
- Philippine narrowmouth toad (Kaloula conjuncta)
- Painted narrowmouth toad (Kaloula picta)
- Banded bullfrog (Kaloula pulchra)
- Sichuan digging frog (Kaloula rugifera)
- Verrucous digging frog (Kaloula verrucosa)
- Liophryne dentata
- Liophryne schlaginhaufeni
- Mantophryne lateralis
- Metamagnusia slateri
- Malaysian treefrog (Metaphrynella pollicaris)
- Metaphrynella sundana
- Javan chorus frog (Microhyla achatina)
- Vietnam rice frog (Microhyla annamensis)
- Berdmore's chorus frog (Microhyla berdmorei)
- Microhyla borneensis
- Painted chorus frog (Microhyla butleri)
- Chakrapani narrow-mouthed frog (Microhyla chakrapanii)
- Microhyla fissipes
- Arcuate-spotted pygmy frog (Microhyla heymonsi)
- Microhyla mantheyi
- Microhyla marmorata
- Mixtured pygmy frog (Microhyla mixtura)
- Okinawa rice frog (Microhyla okinavensis)
- Ant frog (Microhyla ornata)
- Palmated chorus frog (Microhyla palmipes)
- Beautiful pygmy frog (Microhyla pulchra)
- Microhyla rubra
- Sholiga narrow-mouthed frog (Microhyla sholigari)
- Deli paddy frog (Micryletta inornata)
- Myersiella microps
- Nanohyla marmorata
- Oreophryne anthonyi
- Oreophryne biroi
- Oreophryne brachypus
- Oreophryne geislerorum
- Oreophryne hypsiops
- Oreophryne inornata
- Oreophryne kapisa
- Otophryne pyburni
- Otophryne robusta
- Otophryne steyermarki
- Oxydactyla stenodactyla
- Web-foot frog (Paradoxophyla palmata)
- Phrynella pulchra
- Spotted rubber frog (Phrynomantis affinis)
- Marbled rubber frog (Phrynomantis annectens)
- Banded rubber frog (Phrynomantis bifasciatus)
- West African rubber frog (Phrynomantis microps)
- Somali rubber frog (Phrynomantis somalicus)
- Barbour's giant treefrog (Platypelis barbouri)
- Boulenger's giant treefrog (Platypelis grandis)
- Common giant treefrog (Platypelis pollicaris)
- Ambatoharanana giant treefrog (Platypelis tuberifera)
- Fort Dauphin digging frog (Plethodontohyla alluaudi)
- Forest digging frog (Plethodontohyla bipunctata)
- Boulenger's digging frog (Plethodontohyla inguinalis)
- Malagasy climbing rain frog (Plethodontohyla mihanika)
- Mahanoro digging frog (Plethodontohyla notosticta)
- Ocellated digging frog (Plethodontohyla ocellata)
- Rhombophryne coronata
- Madagascar digging frog (Rhombophryne laevipes)
- Brown rain frog (Scaphiophryne brevis)
- Mocquard's rain frog (Scaphiophryne calcarata)
- Scaphiophryne spinosa
- Sphenophryne cornuta
- Bahia yellow frog (Stereocyclops histrio)
- Stereocyclops incrassatus
- Stereocyclops parkeri
- Benavony stump-toed frog (Stumpffia gimmeli)
- Giant stump-toed frog (Rhombophryne grandis)
- Synapturanus mirandaribeiroi
- Synapturanus rabus
- Synapturanus salseri
- Anamalai globular frog (Uperodon anamalaiensis)
- Uperodon globulosus
- Globular frog (Uperodon systoma)
- Sri Lankan bullfrog (Uperodon taprobanicus)
- Eluru dot frog (Uperodon variegatus)
- Xenorhina bidens
- Xenorhina bouwensi
- Xenorhina fuscigula
- Xenorhina macrops
- Xenorhina mehelyi
- Xenorhina obesa
- Xenorhina oxycephala
- Xenorhina parkerorum
- Xenorhina rostrata
- Xenorhina similis

=== Ranidae ===
True frogs

- Abavorana luctuosa
- Amnirana albolabris
- Ilanga frog (Amnirana amnicola)
- Amnirana darlingi
- Amnirana galamensis
- Amnirana lemairei
- Amnirana lepus
- Amolops archotaphus
- Chungan sucker frog (Amolops chunganensis)
- Amolops formosus
- Amolops gerbillus
- Amolops granulosus
- Jaunsar stream frog (Amolops jaunsari)
- Larut sucker frog (Amolops larutensis)
- Amolops mantzorum
- Amolops marmoratus
- Amolops monticola
- Amolops panhai
- Amolops ricketti
- Amolops wuyiensis
- Babina adenopleura
- Chapa frog (Babina chapaensis)
- Emei music frog (Babina daunchina)
- Babina pleuraden
- Schlegel's frog (Chalcorana chalconota)
- Chalcorana raniceps
- Clinotarsus alticola
- Imienpo Station frog (Glandirana emeljanovi)
- Japanese wrinkled frog (Glandirana rugosa)
- Hole-in-the-head frog (Huia cavitympanum)
- Sumatran torrent frog (Huia sumatrana)
- Humerana humeralis
- Humerana miopus
- Hydrophylax gracilis
- Fungoid frog (Hydrophylax malabaricus)
- Hylarana baramica
- Hylarana celebensis
- Common green frog (Hylarana erythraea)
- Garo Hills frog (Hylarana garoensis)
- Hylarana glandulosa
- Kokarit frog (Hylarana lateralis)
- Hylarana laterimaculata
- Hylarana latouchii
- Cope's assam frog (Hylarana leptoglossa)
- Hylarana macrodactyla
- Hylarana mocquardii
- Hylarana montivaga
- Nicobar Island frog (Amnirana nicobariensis)
- Spotted stream frog (Hylarana picturata)
- Hylarana signata
- Two-striped grass frog (Hylarana taipehensis)
- Hylarana tytleri
- Indosylvirana milleti
- Rio Grande leopard frog (Lithobates berlandieri)
- Plains leopard frog (Lithobates blairi)
- American bullfrog (Lithobates catesbeianus)
- Lithobates clamitans
- Forrer's grass frog (Lithobates forreri)
- Pig frog (Lithobates grylio)
- River frog (Lithobates heckscheri)
- Highland frog (Lithobates maculatus)
- Northwest Mexico leopard frog (Lithobates magnaocularis)
- Montezuma leopard frog (Lithobates montezumae)
- Amazon River frog (Lithobates palmipes)
- Pickerel frog (Lithobates palustris)
- Northern leopard frog (Lithobates pipiens)
- Mexican cascades frog (Lithobates pustulosus)
- Mink frog (Lithobates septentrionalis)
- Showy leopard frog (Lithobates spectabilis)
- Southern leopard frog (Lithobates sphenocephalus)
- Wood frog (Lithobates sylvaticus)
- Peralta frog (Lithobates taylori)
- Vaillant's frog (Lithobates vaillanti)
- Carpenter frog (Lithobates virgatipes)
- Warszewitsch's frog (Lithobates warszewitschii)
- Lowland leopard frog (Lithobates yavapaiensis)
- Zweifel's frog (Lithobates zweifeli)
- Meristogenys orphnocnemis
- East China music frog (Nidirana lini)
- Golden crossband frog (Odorrana andersonii)
- Chloronate huia frog (Odorrana chloronota)
- Fujian bamboo-leaf frog (Odorrana exiliversabilis)
- Large odorous frog (Odorrana graminea)
- Hose's frog (Odorrana hosii)
- Green cascade frog (Odorrana livida)
- Margareta's frog (Odorrana margaretae)
- Morafkai frog (Odorrana morafkai)
- Long-snout torrent frog (Odorrana nasica)
- Schmacker's frog (Odorrana schmackeri)
- Bangkimtsing frog (Odorrana swinhoana)
- Dawei frog (Odorrana tiannanensis)
- Kwangsi frog (Odorrana versabilis)
- Papurana arfaki
- Australian wood frog (Papurana daemeli)
- Papurana elberti
- Floresian frog (Papurana florensis)
- Papurana garritor
- Papurana jimiensis
- Papurana kreffti
- Papurana milneana
- Papurana moluccana
- Papurana novaeguineae
- Papua frog (Papurana papua)
- Papua gray frog (Papurana supragrisea)
- Levant water frog (Pelophylax bedriagae)
- Italian pool frog (Pelophylax bergeri)
- Pelophylax fukienensis
- Pelophylax hubeiensis
- Balkan frog (Pelophylax kurtmuelleri)
- Pool frog (Pelophylax lessonae)
- Perez's frog (Pelophylax perezi)
- Eastern golden frog (Pelophylax plancyi)
- Daruma pond frog (Pelophylax porosus)
- Marsh frog (Pelophylax ridibundus)
- Sahara frog (Pelophylax saharicus)
- Pelophylax terentievi
- Pulchrana grandocula
- Pulchrana siberu
- Siberian wood frog (Rana amurensis)
- Moor frog (Rana arvalis)
- Central Asiatic frog (Rana asiatica)
- Northern red-legged frog (Rana aurora)
- Chaochiao frog (Rana chaochiaoensis)
- Asiatic grass frog (Rana chensinensis)
- Korean brown frog (Rana coreana)
- Agile frog (Rana dalmatina)
- Dybowski's frog (Rana dybowskii)
- Greek stream frog (Rana graeca)
- Hanlui brown frog (Rana hanluica)
- Huanren frog (Rana huanrensis)
- Italian stream frog (Rana italica)
- Japanese brown frog (Rana japonica)
- Johns' groove-toed frog (Rana johnsi)
- Plateau brown frog (Rana kukunoris)
- Columbia spotted frog (Rana luteiventris)
- Long-legged wood frog (Rana macrocnemis)
- Rana multidenticulata
- Rana omeimontis
- Montane brown frog (Rana ornativentris)
- Hokkaidō frog (Rana pirica)
- Rana pseudodalmatina
- Stream brown frog (Rana sakuraii)
- Sangzhi frog (Rana sangzhiensis)
- Sichuan frog (Rana shuchinae)
- Tago's brown frog (Rana tagoi)
- Common frog (Rana temporaria)
- Tsushima brown frog (Rana tsushimensis)
- Zhenhai brown frog (Rana zhenhaiensis)
- Sanguirana luzonensis
- Sanguirana sanguinea
- Rock skipper (Staurois latopalmatus)
- Mindanao splash frog (Staurois natator)
- Borneo splash frog (Staurois tuberilinguis)
- Korinchi frog (Sumaterana crassiovis)
- Sylvirana cubitalis
- Sylvirana faber
- Gunther's amoy frog (Sylvirana guentheri)
- Mao-son frog (Sylvirana maosonensis)
- Sylvirana mortenseni
- Sylvirana nigrovittata

=== Myobatrachidae ===
Australian water frogs

- Walpole's frog (Anstisia lutea)
- Karri frog (Anstisia rosea)
- Northern sandhill frog (Arenophryne rotunda)
- Southern sandhill frog (Arenophryne xiphorhyncha)
- Bilingual frog (Crinia bilingua)
- Chirping froglet (Crinia deserticola)
- Kimberley froglet (Crinia fimbriata)
- Quacking frog (Crinia georgiana)
- Glauert's froglet (Crinia glauerti)
- Sign-bearing froglet (Crinia insignifera)
- Moss froglet (Crinia nimbus)
- Eastern sign-bearing froglet (Crinia parinsignifera)
- False western froglet (Crinia pseudinsignifera)
- Remote froglet (Crinia remota)
- Common froglet (Crinia signifera)
- Small western froglet (Crinia subinsignifera)
- Tinkling froglet (Crinia tinnula)
- Smooth frog (Geocrinia laevis)
- Lea's frog (Geocrinia leai)
- Eastern smooth frog (Geocrinia victoriana)
- Nicholl's toadlet (Metacrinia nichollsi)
- Carbine frog (Mixophyes carbinensis)
- Cogger's frog (Mixophyes coggeri)
- Great barred frog (Mixophyes fasciolatus)
- Northern barred frog (Mixophyes schevilli)
- Turtle frog (Myobatrachus gouldii)
- Haswell's frog (Paracrinia haswelli)
- Bibron's toadlet (Pseudophryne bibronii)
- Red-backed toadlet (Pseudophryne coriacea)
- Dendy's toadlet (Pseudophryne dendyi)
- Douglas' toad (Pseudophryne douglasi)
- Günther's toadlet (Pseudophryne guentheri)
- Great brown broodfrog (Pseudophryne major)
- Orange-crowned toadlet (Pseudophryne occidentalis)
- Copper-backed toadlet (Pseudophryne raveni)
- Central Ranges toadlet (Pseudophryne robinsoni)
- Southern toadlet (Pseudophryne semimarmorata)
- Liem's frog (Taudactylus liemi)
- Montane toadlet (Uperoleia altissima)
- Jabiru toadlet (Uperoleia arenicola)
- Derby toadlet (Uperoleia aspera)
- Northern toadlet (Uperoleia borealis)
- Fat toadlet (Uperoleia crassa)
- Dusky toadlet (Uperoleia fusca)
- Glandular toadlet (Uperoleia glandulosa)
- Flood plain toadlet (Uperoleia inundata)
- Smooth toadlet (Uperoleia laevigata)
- Stonemason's toadlet (Uperoleia lithomoda)
- Littlejohn's toadlet (Uperoleia littlejohni)
- Tiny toadlet (Uperoleia micra)
- Tanami toadlet (Uperoleia micromeles)
- Mimic toadlet (Uperoleia mimula)
- Small toadlet (Uperoleia minima)
- Mjoberg's toadlet (Uperoleia mjobergii)
- Wrinkled toadlet (Uperoleia rugosa)
- Russell's toadlet (Uperoleia russelli)
- Pilbara toadlet (Uperoleia saxatilis)
- Ratcheting toadlet (Uperoleia stridera)
- Mole toadlet (Uperoleia talpa)
- Blacksoil toadlet (Uperoleia trachyderma)

=== Phrynobatrachidae ===
Puddle frogs

- Phrynobatrachus acridoides
- African swamp frog (Phrynobatrachus africanus)
- Ringed river frog (Phrynobatrachus annulatus)
- Golden puddle frog (Phrynobatrachus auritus)
- Phrynobatrachus batesii
- Vissoke river frog (Phrynobatrachus bequaerti)
- Phrynobatrachus bullans
- Boutry river frog (Phrynobatrachus calcaratus)
- Phrynobatrachus cornutus
- Medje river frog (Phrynobatrachus dendrobates)
- Phrynobatrachus dispar
- Phrynobatrachus francisci
- Phrynobatrachus fraterculus
- Phrynobatrachus graueri
- Chabanaud's river frog (Phrynobatrachus gutturosus)
- Phrynobatrachus hylaios
- Kenya river frog (Phrynobatrachus keniensis)
- Ahl's river frog (Phrynobatrachus latifrons)
- Phrynobatrachus leveleve
- Phrynobatrachus mababiensis
- Phrynobatrachus minutus
- Natal dwarf puddle frog (Phrynobatrachus natalensis)
- Phrynobatrachus pallidus
- Phrynobatrachus parkeri
- Phrynobatrachus parvulus
- Phrynobatrachus perpalmatus
- Coast river frog (Phrynobatrachus plicatus)
- Phrynobatrachus rungwensis
- Phrynobatrachus sandersoni
- Phrynobatrachus scapularis
- Phrynobatrachus scheffleri
- Phrynobatrachus tokba
- Rwanda river frog (Phrynobatrachus versicolor)
- Phrynobatrachus werneri

=== Hylidae ===
Tree frogs and allies

- Northern cricket frog (Acris crepitans)
- Southern cricket frog (Acris gryllus)
- Warty leaf frog (Agalychnis buckleyi)
- Red-eyed leaf frog (Agalychnis callidryas)
- Mexican giant tree frog (Agalychnis dacnicolor)
- Cat-eyed frog (Agalychnis hulli)
- Morelet's tree frog (Agalychnis moreletii)
- Misfit leaf frog (Agalychnis saltator)
- Gliding tree frog (Agalychnis spurrelli)
- Bruno's casque-headed frog (Aparasphenodon brunoi)
- Aparasphenodon venezolanus
- Aplastodiscus albofrenatus
- Aplastodiscus albosignatus
- Aplastodiscus arildae
- Bocaina tree frog (Aplastodiscus callipygius)
- Cruz's treefrog (Aplastodiscus cavicola)
- Aplastodiscus cochranae
- Aplastodiscus ehrhardti
- Aplastodiscus eugenioi
- Aplastodiscus ibirapitanga
- Aplastodiscus leucopygius
- Aplastodiscus perviridis
- Aplastodiscus sibilatus
- Weygoldt's tree frog (Aplastodiscus weygoldti)
- Benitez's treefrog (Boana benitezi)
- Boana curupi
- Boana exastis
- Boana leucocheila
- Chirique-flusse treefrog (Boana pugnax)
- Chaco treefrog (Boana raniceps)
- Boana stenocephala
- Emerald-eyed treefrog (Boana xerophylla)
- Bokermannohyla ahenea
- Bokermannohyla alvarengai
- Bokermannohyla astartea
- Bokermannohyla caramaschii
- Bokermannohyla carvalhoi
- Bokermannohyla circumdata
- Bokermannohyla diamantina
- Bokermannohyla gouveai
- Bokermannohyla hylax
- Bokermannohyla ibitiguara
- Bokermannohyla ibitipoca
- Bokermannohyla itapoty
- Bokermannohyla luctuosa
- Bokermannohyla martinsi
- Bokermannohyla nanuzae
- Bokermannohyla oxente
- Bokermannohyla pseudopseudis
- Bokermannohyla saxicola
- Bokermannohyla sazimai
- Bromeliad tree frog (Bromeliohyla bromeliacia)
- Corythomantis greeningi
- Splendid leaf frog (Cruziohyla calcarifer)
- Fringe tree frog (Cruziohyla craspedopus)
- Dendropsophus acreanus
- Dendropsophus allenorum
- Dendropsophus anataliasiasi
- Dendropsophus anceps
- Dendropsophus aperomeus
- Dendropsophus araguaya
- Dendropsophus baileyi
- Dendropsophus berthalutzae
- Dendropsophus bifurcus
- Dendropsophus bipunctatus
- Dendropsophus bogerti
- Dendropsophus bokermanni
- Dendropsophus branneri
- Dendropsophus brevifrons
- Dendropsophus cachimbo
- Dendropsophus carnifex
- Dendropsophus coffeus
- Boettger's Colombian treefrog (Dendropsophus columbianus)
- Dendropsophus cruzi
- Dendropsophus decipiens
- Dendropsophus delarivai
- Hourglass treefrog (Dendropsophus ebraccatus)
- Dendropsophus elegans
- Dendropsophus elianeae
- Garagoa treefrog (Dendropsophus garagoensis)
- Dendropsophus gaucheri
- Dendropsophus giesleri
- Dendropsophus haddadi
- Dendropsophus haraldschultzi
- Dendropsophus jimi
- Dendropsophus joannae
- Dendropsophus juliani
- Dendropsophus koechlini
- Dendropsophus labialis
- Dendropsophus leali
- Dendropsophus leucophyllatus
- Dendropsophus luteoocellatus
- Dendropsophus marmoratus
- Dendropsophus mathiassoni
- Interior treefrog (Dendropsophus melanargyreus)
- Dendropsophus meridianus
- Small-headed treefrog (Dendropsophus microcephalus)
- Dendropsophus microps
- Dendropsophus minusculus
- Dendropsophus minutus
- Hosteria la Selva treefrog (Dendropsophus miyatai)
- Dendropsophus nahdereri
- Dendropsophus nanus
- Dendropsophus novaisi
- Dendropsophus oliveirai
- Dendropsophus padreluna
- Dendropsophus parviceps
- Dendropsophus pauiniensis
- Dendropsophus pelidna
- San Carlos treefrog (Dendropsophus phlebodes)
- San Agustin treefrog (Dendropsophus praestans)
- Dendropsophus pseudomeridianus
- Dendropsophus rhodopeplus
- Dendropsophus riveroi
- Dendropsophus robertmertensi
- Dendropsophus rossalleni
- Dendropsophus rubicundulus
- Rusch's treefrog (Dendropsophus ruschii)
- Dendropsophus sanborni
- Dendropsophus sarayacuensis
- Dendropsophus sartori
- Dendropsophus schubarti
- Dendropsophus seniculus
- Dendropsophus soaresi
- Rio Tuquesa treefrog (Dendropsophus subocularis)
- Dendropsophus timbeba
- Rio Uaupes treefrog (Dendropsophus tintinnabulum)
- Triangle treefrog (Dendropsophus triangulum)
- Dendropsophus tritaeniatus
- Dendropsophus virolinensis
- Dendropsophus walfordi
- Dendropsophus werneri
- Dendropsophus xapuriensis
- Dryaderces pearsoni
- Rufous-eyed brook frog (Duellmanohyla rufioculis)
- Santarem treefrog (Dryaderces inframaculata)
- Pine Barrens tree frog (Dryophytes andersonii)
- Ecnomiohyla tuberculosa
- Exerodonta smaragdina
- Exerodonta sumichrasti
- Jerdon's tree frog (Hyla annectans)
- European tree frog (Hyla arborea)
- Canyon tree frog (Hyla arenicolor)
- Bird-voiced tree frog (Hyla avivoca)
- Common Chinese tree frog (Hyla chinensis)
- Cope's gray tree frog (Hyla chrysoscelis)
- American green tree frog (Hyla cinerea)
- Hyla eximia
- Pine woods tree frog (Hyla femoralis)
- Hyla gratiosa
- Hallowell's tree frog (Hyla hallowellii)
- Spotless tree toad (Hyla immaculata)
- Italian tree frog (Hyla intermedia)
- Japanese tree frog (Hyla japonica)
- Mediterranean tree frog (Hyla meridionalis)
- Ridged tree frog (Hyla plicata)
- San Chiang tree frog (Hyla sanchiangensis)
- Sardinian tree frog (Hyla sarda)
- Middle East tree frog (Hyla savignyi)
- Annam tree frog (Hyla simplex)
- Squirrel tree frog (Hyla squirella)
- Shensi tree frog (Hyla tsinlingensis)
- Gray tree frog (Hyla versicolor)
- Wright's mountain tree frog (Hyla wrightorum)
- Rough leaf frog (Hylomantis aspera)
- Granular leaf frog (Hylomantis granulosa)
- Hyloscirtus albopunctulatus
- Hyloscirtus armatus
- Tabor tree frog (Hyloscirtus lascinius)
- Palmer's tree frog (Hyloscirtus palmeri)
- Roque tree frog (Hyloscirtus phyllognathus)
- White-edged tree frog (Hypsiboas albomarginatus)
- White-spotted tree frog (Hypsiboas albopunctatus)
- Hypsiboas andinus
- Hypsiboas atlanticus
- Yungas tree frog (Hypsiboas balzani)
- Bischoff's tree frog (Hypsiboas bischoffi)
- Rusty tree frog (Hypsiboas boans)
- Striped tree frog (Hypsiboas caingua)
- Troschel's tree frog (Hypsiboas calcaratus)
- Charuplaya tree frog (Hypsiboas callipleura)
- Demerara Falls tree frog (Hypsiboas cinerascens)
- Emerald-eyed tree frog (Hypsiboas crepitans)
- Amapa tree frog (Hypsiboas dentei)
- Blacksmith tree frog (Hypsiboas faber)
- Gunther's banded tree frog (Hypsiboas fasciatus)
- Map tree frog (Hypsiboas geographicus)
- Hypsiboas goianus
- Hypsiboas guentheri
- Hobbs' tree frog (Hypsiboas hobbsi)
- Hutchins' tree frog (Hypsiboas hutchinsi)
- Hypsiboas jimenezi
- Hypsiboas joaquini
- Basin tree frog (Hypsiboas lanciformis)
- Lema tree frog (Hypsiboas lemai)
- Fine-lined tree frog (Hypsiboas leptolineatus)
- Hypsiboas liliae
- Usina tree frog (Hypsiboas lundii)
- Mundo Novo tree frog (Hypsiboas marginatus)
- Salta tree frog (Hypsiboas marianitae)
- Smallskin tree frog (Hypsiboas microderma)
- Many-banded tree frog (Hypsiboas multifasciatus)
- Hypsiboas nympha
- Ornate tree frog (Hypsiboas ornatissimus)
- Leopard tree frog (Hypsiboas pardalis)
- Palmar tree frog (Hypsiboas pellucens)
- Imbabura tree frog (Hypsiboas picturatus)
- Cope's eastern Paraguay tree frog (Hypsiboas polytaenius)
- Hypsiboas pombali
- Burmeister's tree frog (Hypsiboas prasinus)
- Montevideo tree frog (Hypsiboas pulchellus)
- Polka-dot tree frog (Hypsiboas punctatus)
- Rosenberg's tree frog (Hypsiboas rosenbergi)
- Valle tree frog (Hypsiboas rubracylus)
- Canal Zone tree frog (Hypsiboas rufitelus)
- Speckled tree frog (Hypsiboas semiguttatus)
- Hypsiboas semilineatus
- La Escalera tree frog (Hypsiboas sibleszi)
- Hypsiboas stellae
- Hypsiboas tepuianus
- Upper Orinoco tree frog (Hypsiboas wavrini)
- Lancaster's treefrog (Isthmohyla lancasteri)
- Gunther's Costa Rican treefrog (Isthmohyla pseudopuma)
- Itapotihyla langsdorffii
- Sazima's tree frog (Julianus pinimus)
- Lysapsus caraya
- Lysapsus laevis
- Lysapsus limellum
- Neblina tree frog (Myersiohyla neblinaria)
- Bokermann's casque-headed frog (Nyctimantis bokermanni)
- Nyctimantis brunoi
- Brown-eyed treefrog (Nyctimantis rugiceps)
- Red-spotted Argentina frog (Nyctimantis siemersi)
- Cheesman's big-eyed tree frog (Nyctimystes cheesmani)
- Madang big-eyed tree frog (Nyctimystes disruptus)
- Kaironk big-eyed tree frog (Nyctimystes foricula)
- Green big-eyed tree frog (Nyctimystes humeralis)
- Sandy big-eyed tree frog (Nyctimystes kubori)
- Common big-eyed tree frog (Nyctimystes narinosus)
- Archipelago big-eyed tree frog (Nyctimystes perimetri)
- Spurred big-eyed tree frog (Nyctimystes pulcher)
- Kokoda big-eyed tree frog (Nyctimystes semipalmatus)
- Morobe big-eyed tree frog (Nyctimystes trachydermis)
- Ololygon arduoa
- Ololygon ariadne
- Ololygon aromothyella
- Canastra snouted tree frog (Ololygon canastrensis)
- Kautsky's snouted tree frog (Ololygon kautskyi)
- Rank's snouted tree frog (Ololygon ranki)
- Bahia snouted tree frog (Ololygon strigilata)
- Osteocephalus alboguttatus
- Buckley's slender-legged tree frog (Osteocephalus buckleyi)
- Osteocephalus cabrerai
- Osteocephalus castaneicola
- Osteocephalus deridens
- Henle's slender-legged tree frog (Osteocephalus elkejungingerae)
- Helena's tree frog (Osteocephalus helenae)
- Osteocephalus heyeri
- Osteocephalus leoniae
- Cayenne slender-legged tree frog (Osteocephalus leprieurii)
- Osteocephalus mutabor
- Osteocephalus oophagus
- Osteocephalus planiceps
- Brazilian slender-legged tree frog (Osteocephalus subtilis)
- Manaus slender-legged tree frog (Osteocephalus taurinus)
- Ecuador slender-legged tree frog (Osteocephalus verruciger)
- Osteocephalus yasuni
- Hispaniolan common tree frog (Osteopilus dominicensis)
- Jamaican laughing frog (Osteopilus ocellatus)
- Cuban tree frog (Osteopilus septentrionalis)
- Phasmahyla cochranae
- Phasmahyla exilis
- Phasmahyla guttata
- Phasmahyla jandaia
- Phasmahyla spectabilis
- Phasmahyla timbo
- Phrynomedusa marginata
- Alagoas heart-tongued frog (Phyllodytes acuminatus)
- Phyllodytes edelmoi
- Brazilian heart-tongued frog (Phyllodytes kautskyi)
- Yellow heart-tongued frog (Phyllodytes luteolus)
- Phyllodytes maculosus
- Bahia heart-tongued frog (Phyllodytes melanomystax)
- Phyllodytes wuchereri
- Phyllomedusa atelopoides
- Phyllomedusa bicolor
- Phyllomedusa boliviana
- Phyllomedusa burmeisteri
- Phyllomedusa camba
- Phyllomedusa coelestis
- Phyllomedusa distincta
- Orange-legged leaf frog (Phyllomedusa hypochondrialis)
- Phyllomedusa iheringii
- Phyllomedusa palliata
- Phyllomedusa rohdei
- Phyllomedusa sauvagii
- Phyllomedusa tarsius
- Phyllomedusa tetraploidea
- Phyllomedusa tomopterna
- Phyllomedusa trinitatis
- White-lined leaf frog (Phyllomedusa vaillantii)
- Phyllomedusa venusta
- Pithecopus azureus
- Large-headed leaf frog (Pithecopus megacephalus)
- Pithecopus nordestinus
- Pithecopus oreades
- Mexican fringe-limbed treefrog (Plectrohyla bistincta)
- Mountain chorus frog (Pseudacris brachyphona)
- Brimley's chorus frog (Pseudacris brimleyi)
- California tree frog (Pseudacris cadaverina)
- Spotted chorus frog (Pseudacris clarkii)
- Spring peeper (Pseudacris crucifer)
- Upland chorus frog (Pseudacris feriarum)
- Cajun chorus frog (Pseudacris fouquettei)
- New Jersey chorus frog (Pseudacris kalmi)
- Boreal chorus frog (Pseudacris maculata)
- Southern chorus frog (Pseudacris nigrita)
- Little grass frog (Pseudacris ocularis)
- Ornate chorus frog (Pseudacris ornata)
- Pacific tree frog (Pseudacris regilla)
- Strecker's chorus frog (Pseudacris streckeri)
- Western chorus frog (Pseudacris triseriata)
- Pseudis bolbodactyla
- Pseudis boliviana
- Pseudis cardosoi
- Pseudis fusca
- Pseudis minuta
- Pseudis paradoxa
- Pseudis platensis
- Pseudis tocantins
- Copan stream frog (Ptychohyla hypomykter)
- Schultze's stream frog (Ptychohyla leonhardschultzei)
- Small-eared treefrog (Rheohyla miotympanum)
- Scarthyla goinorum
- Scarthyla vigilans
- Scinax acuminatus
- Agile snouted tree frog (Scinax agilis)
- Teresopolis snouted tree frog (Scinax albicans)
- Scinax altae
- Crubixa snouted tree frog (Scinax alter)
- Scinax angrensis
- Rio Mutum snouted tree frog (Scinax argyreornatus)
- Scinax auratus
- Scinax berthae
- Blair's snouted treefrog (Scinax blairi)
- Scinax boesemani
- Boulenger's snouted treefrog (Scinax boulengeri)
- Scinax brieni
- Scinax caldarum
- Scinax cardosoi
- Scinax carnevallii
- Scinax catharinae
- Scinax centralis
- Scinax chiquitanus
- Scinax constrictus
- Scinax cretatus
- Scinax crospedospilus
- Manaus snouted treefrog (Scinax cruentommus)
- Lanceback tree frog (Scinax curicica)
- Scinax cuspidatus
- Scinax duartei
- Sipurio snouted treefrog (Scinax elaeochrous)
- Scinax eurydice
- Scinax exiguus
- Scinax flavoguttatus
- Scinax funereus
- Scinax fuscomarginatus
- Scinax fuscovarius
- Scinax garbei
- Scinax granulatus
- Scinax hayii
- Scinax hiemalis
- Scinax humilis
- Scinax ictericus
- Scinax iquitorum
- Vaupes treefrog (Scinax karenanneae)
- Scinax kennedyi
- Lindsay's snouted treefrog (Scinax lindsayi)
- Scinax littoralis
- Scinax littoreus
- Scinax longilineus
- Scinax luizotavioi
- Scinax machadoi
- Scinax manriquei
- Alpinopolis snouted treefrog (Scinax maracaya)
- Scinax nasicus
- Scinax nebulosus
- Scinax obtriangulatus
- Scinax pachycrus
- Scinax parkeri
- Scinax pedromedinae
- Scinax perereca
- Scinax perpusillus
- Gran Rio snouted treefrog (Scinax proboscideus)
- Scinax quinquefasciatus
- Scinax rizibilis
- Caracas snouted treefrog (Scinax rostratus)
- Red snouted treefrog (Scinax ruber)
- Scinax similis
- Scinax squalirostris
- Stauffer's treefrog (Scinax staufferi)
- Scinax sugillatus
- Scinax tigrinus
- Scinax trilineatus
- Scinax uruguayus
- Scinax v-signatus
- Scinax wandae
- Venezuela snouted treefrog (Scinax x-signatus)
- Common Mexican tree frog (Smilisca baudinii)
- Lowland burrowing tree frog (Smilisca fodiens)
- New Granada cross-banded tree frog (Smilisca phaeota)
- Nicaragua cross-banded tree frog (Smilisca puma)
- Panama cross-banded tree frog (Smilisca sila)
- Veragua cross-banded tree frog (Smilisca sordida)
- Sphaenorhynchus caramaschii
- Napo lime tree frog (Sphaenorhynchus carneus)
- Doris' lime tree frog (Sphaenorhynchus dorisae)
- Orinoco lime tree frog (Sphaenorhynchus lacteus)
- Sphaenorhynchus mirim
- Lutz's lime tree frog (Sphaenorhynchus orophilus)
- Linhares lime tree frog (Sphaenorhynchus palustris)
- Paulo's lime tree frog (Sphaenorhynchus pauloalvini)
- Rio lime tree frog (Sphaenorhynchus planicola)
- South American lime tree frog (Sphaenorhynchus platycephalus)
- Bokermann's lime tree frog (Sphaenorhynchus prasinus)
- Cochran's lime tree frog (Sphaenorhynchus surdus)
- Ayarzaguena's treefrog (Tepuihyla edelcae)
- Big-eye slender-legged treefrog (Tepuihyla exophthalma)
- Tepuihyla shushupe
- Canelos treefrog (Tepuihyla tuberculosa)
- Mahogany tree frog (Tlalocohyla loquax)
- Painted tree frog (Tlalocohyla picta)
- Dwarf Mexican tree frog (Tlalocohyla smithii)
- Bokermann's casque-headed tree frog (Trachycephalus atlas)
- Surinam golden-eyed tree frog (Trachycephalus coriaceus)
- Trachycephalus cunauaru
- Trachycephalus dibernardoi
- New River treefrog (Trachycephalus hadroceps)
- Trachycephalus helioi
- Rio golden-eyed treefrog (Trachycephalus imitatrix)
- Jordan's casque-headed treefrog (Trachycephalus jordani)
- Trachycephalus lepidus
- Amazonian milk frog (Trachycephalus macrotis)
- Trachycephalus mambaiensis
- Porto Alegre golden-eyed treefrog (Trachycephalus mesophaeus)
- Black-spotted casque-headed treefrog (Trachycephalus nigromaculatus)
- Chacoan milk frog (Trachycephalus quadrangulum)
- Mission golden-eyed treefrog (Trachycephalus resinifictrix)
- Trachycephalus typhonius
- Venezuela casque-headed frog (Trachycephalus venezolanus)
- Milky treefrog (Trachycephalus vermiculatus)
- Yucatan casque-headed treefrog (Triprion petasatus)
- Shovel-headed treefrog (Triprion spatulatus)
- Xenohyla eugenioi

=== Pelodryadidae ===
Australian treefrogs

- Striped burrowing frog (Cyclorana alboguttata)
- Giant frog (Cyclorana australis)
- Short-footed frog (Cyclorana brevipes)
- Hidden-ear frog (Cyclorana cryptotis)
- Knife-footed frog (Cyclorana cultripes)
- Long-footed frog (Cyclorana longipes)
- Daly Waters frog (Cyclorana maculosa)
- Main's frog (Cyclorana maini)
- Small frog (Cyclorana manya)
- New Holland frog (Cyclorana novaehollandiae)
- Western water-holding frog (Cyclorana occidentalis)
- Eastern water-holding frog (Cyclorana platycephala)
- Wailing frog (Cyclorana vagitus)
- Rough frog (Cyclorana verrucosa)
- Slender tree frog (Litoria adelaidensis)
- Horst's tree frog (Litoria amboinensis)
- Angiana tree frog (Litoria angiana)
- Arfakiana tree frog (Litoria arfakiana)
- Litoria auae
- Litoria bibonius
- Northern dwarf tree frog (Litoria bicolor)
- Green-thighed frog (Litoria brevipalmata)
- Burrows tree frog (Litoria burrowsi)
- Australian green tree frog (Litoria caerulea)
- Cave-dwelling frog (Litoria cavernicola)
- Red-eyed green treefrog (Litoria chloris)
- Litoria christianbergmanni
- Blue Mountains tree frog (Litoria citropa)
- Yule Island tree frog (Litoria congenita)
- Copland's rock frog (Litoria coplandi)
- Spotted-thighed tree frog (Litoria cyclorhyncha)
- Dahl's aquatic frog (Litoria dahlii)
- Darlington's Madang tree frog (Litoria darlingtoni)
- Bleating tree frog (Litoria dentata)
- Dwarf rocket frog (Litoria dorsalis)
- Buzzing tree frog (Litoria electrica)
- Fringed tree frog (Litoria eucnemis)
- Everett's Timor treefrog (Litoria everetti)
- Southern brown tree frog (Litoria ewingii)
- Litoria exophthalmia
- Eastern dwarf tree frog (Litoria fallax)
- Litoria flavescens
- Green-eyed tree frog (Litoria genimaculata)
- Centralian tree frog (Litoria gilleni)
- Dainty green tree frog (Litoria gracilenta)
- Litoria havina
- Litoria humboldtorum
- Southern New Guinea tree frog (Litoria impura)
- Bumpy rocket frog (Litoria inermis)
- White-lipped tree frog (Litoria infrafrenata)
- Western Highland tree frog (Litoria iris)
- Jervis Bay tree frog (Litoria jervisiensis)
- Broad-palmed frog (Litoria latopalmata)
- Lesueur's frog (Litoria lesueurii)
- Littlejohn's tree frog (Litoria littlejohni)
- Long-snouted frog (Litoria longirostris)
- Rossell Island tree frog (Litoria louisiadensis)
- Rockhole frog (Litoria meiriana)
- Javelin frog (Litoria microbelos)
- Nodugl tree frog (Litoria micromembrana)
- Oruge tree frog (Litoria modica)
- Motorbike frog (Litoria moorei)
- Kassam tree frog (Litoria multiplica)
- Australian waterfall frog (Litoria nannotis)
- Snow Mountains tree frog (Litoria napaea)
- Striped rocket frog (Litoria nasuta)
- Bridled frog (Litoria nigrofrenata)
- Black-dotted tree frog (Litoria nigropunctata)
- Southern leaf green tree frog (Litoria nudidigita)
- Pale frog (Litoria pallida)
- Plains brown tree frog (Litoria paraewingi)
- Pearson's green tree frog (Litoria pearsoniana)
- Peron's tree frog (Litoria peronii)
- Masked frog (Litoria personata)
- Leaf green tree frog (Litoria phyllochroa)
- Water-holding frog (Litoria platycephala)
- Litoria pronimia
- Efogi tree frog (Litoria prora)
- Geelvink pygmy tree frog (Litoria pygmaea)
- Revealed frog (Litoria revelata)
- Litoria rivicola
- Roth's tree frog (Litoria rothii)
- Desert tree frog (Litoria rubella)
- Litoria spinifera
- Magnificent tree frog (Litoria splendida)
- Litoria staccato
- Treasury Island tree frog (Litoria thesaurensis)
- Menemsorae tree frog (Litoria timida)
- Tornier's frog (Litoria tornieri)
- Tyler's tree frog (Litoria tyleri)
- Whistling tree frog (Litoria verreauxii)
- Brown River tree frog (Litoria vocivincens)
- Watjulum frog (Litoria watjulumensis)
- Litoria wilcoxii
- Highland tree frog (Litoria wollastoni)
- Orange-thighed frog (Litoria xanthomera)

=== Hyperoliidae ===
African reed frogs

- African wart frog (Acanthixalus spinosus)
- Golden banana frog (Afrixalus aureus)
- Afrixalus brachycnemis
- Afrixalus crotalus
- Pickersgill's banana frog (Afrixalus delicatus)
- Brown banana frog (Afrixalus dorsalis)
- Congo banana frog (Afrixalus equatorialis)
- Afrixalus fornasini
- Banded banana frog (Afrixalus fulvovittatus)
- Afrixalus laevis
- Afrixalus leucostictus
- Kivu banana frog (Afrixalus orophilus)
- Angola banana frog (Afrixalus osorioi)
- Afrixalus paradorsalis
- Afrixalus quadrivittatus
- Afrixalus septentrionalis
- Afrixalus stuhlmanni
- Savanna banana frog (Afrixalus vittiger)
- Weidholz's banana frog (Afrixalus weidholzi)
- Afrixalus wittei
- Alexteroon hypsiphonus
- Alexteroon obstetricans
- Cryptothylax greshoffii
- Whitebelly reed frog (Heterixalus alboguttatus)
- Andrakata reed frog (Heterixalus andrakata)
- Betsileo reed frog (Heterixalus betsileo)
- Boettger's reed frog (Heterixalus boettgeri)
- Heterixalus carbonei
- Heterixalus luteostriatus
- Madagascar reed frog (Heterixalus madagascariensis)
- Heterixalus punctatus
- Rutenberg's reed frog (Heterixalus rutenbergi)
- Three-color reed frog (Heterixalus tricolor)
- Heterixalus variabilis
- Sharp-headed long reed frog (Hyperolius acuticeps)
- Hyperolius adspersus
- Hyperolius argus
- Hyperolius balfouri
- Baumann's reed frog (Hyperolius baumanni)
- Benguella long reed frog (Hyperolius benguellensis)
- Bocage's reed frog (Hyperolius bocagei)
- Hyperolius bolifambae
- Hyperolius camerunensis
- Ahl's reed frog (Hyperolius castaneus)
- Hyperolius cinnamomeoventris
- Hyperolius concolor
- Hyperolius dartevellei
- Hyperolius discodactylus
- Bushoho reed frog (Hyperolius frontalis)
- Lime reed frog (Hyperolius fusciventris)
- Hyperolius glandicolor
- Dotted reed frog (Hyperolius guttulatus)
- Arum frog (Hyperolius horstockii)
- Howell's long reed frog (Hyperolius howelli)
- Igbetti long reed frog (Hyperolius igbettensis)
- Hyperolius kachalolae
- Hyperolius kivuensis
- Koehler's green frog (Hyperolius koehleri)
- Hyperolius kuligae
- Lamotte's reed frog (Hyperolius lamottei)
- Hyperolius langi
- Hyperolius lateralis
- Hyperolius major
- Hyperolius marginatus
- Hyperolius mariae
- Marbled reed frog (Hyperolius marmoratus)
- Hyperolius mitchelli
- Hyperolius molleri
- Mountain reed frog (Hyperolius montanus)
- Hyperolius mosaicus
- Pointed long reed frog (Hyperolius nasicus)
- Hyperolius nasutus
- Hyperolius nitidulus
- Hyperolius occidentalis
- Hyperolius ocellatus
- Hyperolius parallelus
- Hyperolius pardalis
- Hyperolius parkeri
- Hyperolius phantasticus
- Hyperolius picturatus
- Hyperolius pictus
- Hyperolius platyceps
- Hyperolius poweri
- Hyperolius pseudargus
- Hyperolius pusillus
- Hyperolius pyrrhodictyon
- Hyperolius quinquevittatus
- Hyperolius rhodesianus
- Rwanda long reed frog (Hyperolius rwandae)
- Hyperolius schoutedeni
- Hyperolius semidiscus
- Hyperolius sheldricki
- Hyperolius steindachneri
- Hyperolius substriatus
- Hyperolius swynnertoni
- Hyperolius sylvaticus
- Hyperolius tuberculatus
- Hyperolius tuberilinguis
- Hyperolius veithi
- Common reed frog (Hyperolius viridiflavus)
- Robust long reed frog (Hyperolius viridis)
- Silver running frog (Kassina cassinoides)
- Brown running frog (Kassina fusca)
- Kassina kuvangensis
- Kassina maculata
- Kassina maculifer
- Marbled running frog (Kassina maculosa)
- Kassina schioetzi
- Senegal land frog (Kassina senegalensis)
- Kassina somalica
- Kassinula wittei
- Opisthothylax immaculatus
- Paracassina obscura
- Phlyctimantis boulengeri
- Olive striped frog (Phlyctimantis leonardi)
- Phlyctimantis verrucosus
- Weale's running frog (Semnodactylus wealii)
- Seychelles treefrog (Tachycnemis seychellensis)

=== Pyxicephalidae ===
Box-headed frogs

- Angola river frog (Amietia angolensis)
- Chapin's river frog (Amietia chapini)
- Amietia desaegeri
- Sani pass frog (Amietia dracomontana)
- Cape river frog (Amietia fuscigula)
- Natal Drakensberg frog (Amietia hymenopus)
- Nutt's river frog (Amietia nutti)
- Amani river frog (Amietia tenuoplicata)
- Amietia vandijki
- Maluti river frog (Amietia vertebralis)
- Molo frog (Amietia wittei)
- Hewitt's moss frog (Anhydrophryne hewitti)
- Bainskloof moss frog (Arthroleptella bicolor)
- De Villiers' moss frog (Arthroleptella villiersi)
- Aubria masako
- Aubria occidentalis
- Aubria subsigillata
- Boettger's dainty frog (Cacosternum boettgeri)
- Karoo dainty frog (Cacosternum karooicum)
- Cacosternum kinangopensis
- Namaqua caco (Cacosternum namaquense)
- Bronze caco (Cacosternum nanum)
- Mountain caco (Cacosternum parvum)
- Flat caco (Cacosternum platys)
- Cacosternum plimptoni
- Striped caco (Cacosternum striatum)
- African bullfrog (Pyxicephalus adspersus)
- Parry's bullfrog (Pyxicephalus angusticeps)
- Edible bullfrog (Pyxicephalus edulis)
- Calabresi's bullfrog (Pyxicephalus obbianus)
- Banded stream frog (Strongylopus bonaespei)
- Striped stream frog (Strongylopus fasciatus)
- Fuelleborn's stream frog (Strongylopus fuelleborni)
- Gray's stream frog (Strongylopus grayii)
- Strongylopus merumontanus
- Namaqua stream frog (Strongylopus springbokensis)
- Wager's stream frog (Strongylopus wageri)
- Common sand frog (Tomopterna cryptotis)
- Delalande's sand frog (Tomopterna delalandii)
- Tomopterna elegans
- Gallmann's sand frog (Tomopterna gallmanni)
- Tomopterna kachowskii
- Knocking sand frog (Tomopterna krugerensis)
- Tomopterna luganga
- Marbled sand frog (Tomopterna marmorata)
- Natal sand frog (Tomopterna natalensis)
- Tandy's sand frog (Tomopterna tandyi)
- Rough sand frog (Tomopterna tuberculosa)
- Wamba sand frog (Tomopterna wambensis)

=== Limnodynastidae ===
Australian ground frogs

- Tusked frog (Adelotus brevis)
- Western spotted frog (Heleioporus albopunctatus)
- Western marsh frog (Heleioporus barycragus)
- Moaning frog (Heleioporus eyrei)
- Plain frog (Heleioporus inornatus)
- Sand frog (Heleioporus psammophilus)
- Lechriodus aganoposis
- Fletcher's frog (Lechriodus fletcheri)
- Lechriodus melanopyga
- Lechriodus platyceps
- Marbled frog (Limnodynastes convexiusculus)
- Flat-headed frog (Limnodynastes depressus)
- Western bullfrog (Limnodynastes dorsalis)
- Limnodynastes dumerilii
- Long-thumbed frog (Limnodynastes fletcheri)
- Giant banjo frog (Limnodynastes interioris)
- Woodworker frog (Limnodynastes lignarius)
- Striped marsh frog (Limnodynastes peronii)
- Salmon-striped frog (Limnodynastes salmini)
- Spotted grass frog (Limnodynastes tasmaniensis)
- Northern banjo frog (Limnodynastes terraereginae)
- White-footed frog (Neobatrachus albipes)
- Northern burrowing frog (Neobatrachus aquilonius)
- Trilling frog (Neobatrachus centralis)
- Tawny frog (Neobatrachus fulvus)
- Kunapalari frog (Neobatrachus kunapalari)
- Humming frog (Neobatrachus pelobatoides)
- Painted burrowing frog (Neobatrachus pictus)
- Sudell's frog (Neobatrachus sudelli)
- Shoemaker frog (Neobatrachus sutor)
- Goldfield's bull frog (Neobatrachus wilsmorei)
- Crucifix toad (Notaden bennettii)
- Northern spadefoot toad (Notaden melanoscaphus)
- Desert spadefoot toad (Notaden nichollsi)
- Weigel's toad (Notaden weigeli)
- Ornate burrowing frog (Platyplectrum ornatum)
- Spencer's burrowing frog (Platyplectrum spenceri)

=== Ceratophryidae ===
Common horned frogs

- Brazilian horned frog (Ceratophrys aurita)
- Venezuelan horned frog (Ceratophrys calcarata)
- Surinam horned frog (Ceratophrys cornuta)
- Cranwell's horned frog (Ceratophrys cranwelli)
- Caatinga horned frog (Ceratophrys joazeirensis)
- Chacophrys pierottii
- Paraguay horned frog (Lepidobatrachus asper)
- Budgett's frog (Lepidobatrachus laevis)
- Lepidobatrachus llanensis

=== Odontophrynidae ===
Odontophrynid frogs

- Bahia forest frog (Macrogenioglottus alipioi)
- Common lesser escuerzo (Odontophrynus americanus)
- Carvalho's escuerzo (Odontophrynus carvalhoi)
- Odontophrynus cordobae
- Rio Grande escuerzo (Odontophrynus cultripes)
- Cei's escuerzo (Odontophrynus lavillai)
- Odontophrynus occidentalis
- Guenther's horned frog (Proceratophrys appendiculata)
- Proceratophrys avelinoi
- Peters' smooth horned frog (Proceratophrys bigibbosa)
- Proceratophrys boiei
- Proceratophrys brauni
- Proceratophrys concavitympanum
- Proceratophrys cristiceps
- Proceratophrys fryi
- Proceratophrys goyana
- Proceratophrys laticeps
- Proceratophrys melanopogon
- Moehring’s smooth horned frog (Proceratophrys moehringi)
- Proceratophrys salvatori
- Proceratophrys schirchi
- Proceratophrys subguttata
- Proceratophrys vielliardi

=== Ptychadenidae ===
Grassland frogs

- Hildebrandtia macrotympanum
- African ornate frog (Hildebrandtia ornata)
- Lanza's frog (Lanzarana largeni)
- Victoria ridged frog (Ptychadena aequiplicata)
- Anchieta's ridged frog (Ptychadena anchietae)
- Ansorge's ridged frog (Ptychadena ansorgii)
- Broad-banded grass frog (Ptychadena bibroni)
- Rough ridged frog (Ptychadena bunoderma)
- Christy's grassland frog (Ptychadena christyi)
- Ptychadena chrysogaster
- Ptychadena cooperi
- Ptychadena gansi
- Ptychadena grandisonae
- Ptychadena guibei
- Ptychadena keilingi
- Ptychadena longirostris
- Mahnert's ridged frog (Ptychadena mahnerti)
- Mascarene grass frog (Ptychadena mascareniensis)
- Mozambique ridged frog (Ptychadena mossambica)
- Ptychadena neumanni
- Ptychadena nilotica
- Ptychadena obscura
- Sharp-nosed frog (Ptychadena oxyrhynchus)
- Ptychadena perplicata
- Perret's grassland frog (Ptychadena perreti)
- Ptychadena porosissima
- Ptychadena pumilio
- Schilluk ridged frog (Ptychadena schillukorum)
- Ptychadena stenocephala
- Ptychadena straeleni
- Ptychadena subpunctata
- Sierra Leone grassland frog (Ptychadena superciliaris)
- Dwarf grass frog (Ptychadena taenioscelis)
- Central grassland frog (Ptychadena tellinii)
- Ptychadena tournieri
- Dakar grassland frog (Ptychadena trinodis)
- Ptychadena upembae
- Ptychadena uzungwensis

=== Leptodactylidae ===
Southern frogs

- Adenomera ajurauna
- Santarém terrestrial nest-building frog (Adenomera amicorum)
- Lowland tropical bullfrog (Adenomera andreae)
- Adenomera araucaria
- Orange-legged terrestrial nest-building frog (Adenomera aurantiaca)
- Bokermann's tropical bullfrog (Adenomera bokermanni)
- Adenomera chicomendesi
- Adenomera coca
- Adenomera diptyx
- Adenomera engelsi
- Glaucia’s terrestrial nest-building frog (Adenomera glauciae)
- Adenomera heyeri
- Dark-spotted thin-toed frog (Adenomera hylaedactyla)
- Adenomera juikitam
- Kayapó terrestrial nest-building frog (Adenomera kayapo)
- Marbled tropical bullfrog (Adenomera marmorata)
- Adenomera nana
- Adenomera saci
- Adenomera simonstuarti
- Tapajós terrestrial nest-building frog (Adenomera tapajonica)
- Adenomera thomei
- Bokermann's bromeliad frog (Crossodactylodes bokermanni)
- Perez's snouted frog (Edalorhina perezi)
- Freiberg's forest toadlet (Engystomops freibergi)
- Engystomops montubio
- Peters' dwarf frog (Engystomops petersi)
- Guayaquil dwarf frog (Engystomops pustulatus)
- Tungara frog (Engystomops pustulosus)
- Engystomops puyango
- Rand's dwarf frog (Engystomops randi)
- Hydrolaetare caparu
- Feijo white-lipped frog (Hydrolaetare dantasi)
- Schmidt's forest frog (Hydrolaetare schmidti)
- Leptodactylus albilabris
- Leptodactylus apepyta
- Leptodactylus barrioi
- Bolivian white-lipped frog (Leptodactylus bolivianus)
- Leptodactylus brevipes
- Vizcacheras' white-lipped frog (Leptodactylus bufonius)
- Leptodactylus caatingae
- Leptodactylus colombiensis
- Sazima's white-lipped frog (Leptodactylus cunicularius)
- Leptodactylus cupreus
- Madre de Dios thin-toed frog (Leptodactylus didymus)
- Leptodactylus diedrus
- Vanzolini's Amazon frog (Leptodactylus discodactylus)
- Marbled white-lipped frog (Leptodactylus elenae)
- Yellow painted frog (Leptodactylus flavopictus)
- American white-lipped frog (Leptodactylus fragilis)
- Potter foam frog (Leptodactylus furnarius)
- Rufous frog (Leptodactylus fuscus)
- Dumeril's striped frog (Leptodactylus gracilis)
- Leptodactylus griseigularis
- Guiana thin-toed frog (Leptodactylus guianensis)
- San Miguel Island frog (Leptodactylus insularum)
- Leptodactylus intermedius
- Joly's frog (Leptodactylus jolyi)
- Leptodactylus kilombo
- Knudsen's thin-toed frog (Leptodactylus knudseni)
- Leptodactylus labrosus
- Labyrinth frog (Leptodactylus labyrinthicus)
- Oven frog (Leptodactylus latinasus)
- Argus frog (Leptodactylus latrans)
- Common thin-toed frog (Leptodactylus leptodactyloides)
- Leptodactylus lithonaetes
- Leptodactylus longirostris
- Wrestler frog (Leptodactylus luctator)
- Miranda's white-lipped frog (Leptodactylus macrosternum)
- Sabinal frog (Leptodactylus melanonotus)
- Myers' thin-toed frog (Leptodactylus myersi)
- Basin white-lipped frog (Leptodactylus mystaceus)
- Moustached frog (Leptodactylus mystacinus)
- Leptodactylus natalensis
- Leptodactylus nesiotus
- Iporanga white-lipped frog (Leptodactylus notoaktites)
- Leptodactylus oreomantis
- Pará thin-toed frog (Leptodactylus paraensis)
- Leptodactylus paranaru
- Leptodactylus payaya
- South American bullfrog (Leptodactylus pentadactylus)
- Peters' thin-toed frog (Leptodactylus petersii)
- Nova Teutonia white-lipped frog (Leptodactylus plaumanni)
- Pointedbelly frog (Leptodactylus podicipinus)
- Turbo white-lipped frog (Leptodactylus poecilochilus)
- Ceara white-lipped frog (Leptodactylus pustulatus)
- Red-thighed thin-toed frog (Leptodactylus rhodomerus)
- Rose-lipped thin-toed frog (Leptodactylus rhodomystax)
- Peru white-lipped frog (Leptodactylus rhodonotus)
- Rivero's white-lipped frog (Leptodactylus riveroi)
- Leptodactylus rugosus
- Gran Sabana thin-toed frog (Leptodactylus sabanensis)
- Savage's thin-toed frog (Leptodactylus savagei)
- Spix's white-lipped frog (Leptodactylus spixi)
- San Jose white-lipped frog (Leptodactylus stenodema)
- Basin white-lipped frog (Leptodactylus syphax)
- Pernambuco white-lipped frog (Leptodactylus troglodytes)
- Windward Islands ditch frog (Leptodactylus validus)
- Northeastern pepper frog (Leptodactylus vastus)
- Leptodactylus ventrimaculatus
- Jim's white-lipped frog (Leptodactylus viridis)
- Wagner's white-lipped frog (Leptodactylus wagneri)
- Gold-striped frog (Lithodytes lineatus)
- Paratelmatobius cardosoi
- San Andre rapids frog (Paratelmatobius poecilogaster)
- Linhares dwarf frog (Physalaemus aguirrei)
- Bahia dwarf frog (Physalaemus albifrons)
- Menwig frog (Physalaemus albonotatus)
- Physalaemus atim
- Physalaemus atlanticus
- Bocaina dwarf frog (Physalaemus barrioi)
- Weeping frog (Physalaemus biligonigerus)
- Bokermann's dwarf frog (Physalaemus bokermanni)
- Physalaemus camacan
- Physalaemus carrizorum
- Physalaemus centralis
- Maracas dwarf frog (Physalaemus cicada)
- Crombie's dwarf frog (Physalaemus crombiei)
- Physalaemus cuqui
- Barker frog (Physalaemus cuvieri)
- Jaboticatubas dwarf frog (Physalaemus deimaticus)
- Steindachner's dwarf frog (Physalaemus ephippifer)
- Physalaemus erikae
- Physalaemus feioi
- Whistling dwarf frog (Physalaemus fernandezae)
- Physalaemus fischeri
- Graceful dwarf frog (Physalaemus gracilis)
- Hensel's dwarf frog (Physalaemus henselii)
- Jordan's dwarf frog (Physalaemus jordanensis)
- Physalaemus kroyeri
- Physalaemus lateristriga
- Braun's dwarf frog (Physalaemus lisei)
- Mantagnes dwarf frog (Physalaemus maculiventris)
- Brown-spotted dwarf frog (Physalaemus marmoratus)
- Sorocaba dwarf frog (Physalaemus moreirae)
- Santa Catharina dwarf frog (Physalaemus nanus)
- Cuyaba dwarf frog (Physalaemus nattereri)
- Linhares dwarf frog (Physalaemus obtectus)
- Atlantic Forest dwarf frog (Physalaemus olfersii)
- Physalaemus orophilus
- Rio Grande dwarf frog (Physalaemus riograndensis)
- Helvetia dwarf frog (Physalaemus santafecinus)
- Girard's dwarf frog (Physalaemus signifer)
- Iguape dwarf frog (Physalaemus spiniger)
- Pleurodema alium
- Four-eyed frog (Pleurodema bibroni)
- Rufous four-eyed frog (Pleurodema borellii)
- Colombian four-eyed frog (Pleurodema brachyops)
- Large four-eyed frog (Pleurodema bufoninum)
- Juliaca four-eyed frog (Pleurodema cinereum)
- Pleurodema cordobae
- Peters' four-eyed frog (Pleurodema diplolister)
- Guayapa's four-eyed frog (Pleurodema guayapae)
- Mendoza four-eyed frog (Pleurodema nebulosum)
- Chile four-eyed frog (Pleurodema thaul)
- Spotted-flanks four-eyed frog (Pleurodema tucumanum)
- Pseudopaludicola ameghini
- Pseudopaludicola atragula
- Bolivian swamp frog (Pseudopaludicola boliviana)
- Pseudopaludicola canga
- Leticia swamp frog (Pseudopaludicola ceratophyes)
- Pseudopaludicola coracoralinae
- Pseudopaludicola facureae
- Hensel's swamp frog (Pseudopaludicola falcipes)
- Pseudopaludicola florencei
- Pseudopaludicola giarettai
- Pseudopaludicola hyleaustralis
- Pseudopaludicola jaredi
- Lynch's swamp frog (Pseudopaludicola llanera)
- Pseudopaludicola matuta
- Minas swamp froglet (Pseudopaludicola mineira)
- Pseudopaludicola motorzinho
- Pseudopaludicola murundu
- Cope's swamp frog (Pseudopaludicola mystacalis)
- Pseudopaludicola pocoto
- Colombian swamp frog (Pseudopaludicola pusilla)
- Chupada swamp frog (Pseudopaludicola saltica)
- Goias swamp frog (Pseudopaludicola ternetzi)
- Banhado frog (Scythrophrys sawayae)

=== Brachycephalidae ===
Saddleback toads

- Brazilian gold frog (Brachycephalus didactylus)
- Pumpkin toadlet (Brachycephalus ephippium)
- Brachycephalus ferruginus
- Flea-frog (Brachycephalus hermogenesi)
- Serra Cantareira saddleback toad (Brachycephalus nodoterga)
- Ischnocnema bolbodactyla
- Soberbo robber frog (Ischnocnema erythromera)
- Ischnocnema gehrti
- Ischnocnema gualteri
- Ischnocnema guentheri
- Ischnocnema henselii
- Ischnocnema hoehnei
- Ischnocnema holti
- Izecksohn's robber frog (Ischnocnema izecksohni)
- Ischnocnema juipoca
- Ischnocnema lactea
- Ischnocnema nasuta
- Itataita robber frog (Ischnocnema nigriventris)
- Ischnocnema octavioi
- Espirito Santo robber frog (Ischnocnema oea)
- Ischnocnema parva
- Ischnocnema penaxavantinho
- Boraceia robber frog (Ischnocnema randorum)
- Ischnocnema sambaqui
- Sao Paulo robber frog (Ischnocnema spanios)
- Ischnocnema venancioi
- Brazilian big-headed frog (Ischnocnema verrucosa

=== Hylodidae ===
Tree toads and allies

- Crossodactylus caramaschii
- Gaudichaud's frog (Crossodactylus gaudichaudii)
- Lutz's spinythumb frog (Crossodactylus lutzorum)
- Schmidt's spinythumb frog (Crossodactylus schmidti)
- Hylodes amnicola
- Warty tree toad (Hylodes asper)
- Hylodes caete
- Hylodes cardosoi
- Rio tree toad (Hylodes charadranaetes)
- Hylodes fredi
- Hylodes heyeri
- Baumann's tree toad (Hylodes lateristrigatus)
- Rio Grande tree toad (Hylodes meridionalis)
- Humboldt's tree toad (Hylodes perplicatus)
- Boraceia tree toad (Hylodes phyllodes)
- Hylodes pipilans
- Rio big-tooth frog (Megaelosia goeldii)
- Phantasmarana apuana
- Lutz's big-tooth frog (Phantasmarana lutzae)

=== Hemisotidae ===
Shovelnose frogs

- Guinea snout-burrower (Hemisus guineensis)
- Marbled snout-burrower (Hemisus marmoratus)
- Ethiopian shovelnose frog (Hemisus microscaphus)
- Olive shovelnose frog (Hemisus olivaceus)
- Perret's shovelnose frog (Hemisus perreti)

=== Other frog species ===
- Tukeit Hill frog (Allophryne ruthveni)
- Tonchek spiny-chest frog (Alsodes gargola)
- Walpole's frog (Anstisia lutea)
- Portezuelo frog (Atelognathus salai)
- Marbled wood frog (Batrachyla antartandica)
- Grey wood frog (Batrachyla leptopus)
- Banded wood frog (Batrachyla taeniata)
- Ceuthomantis cavernibardus
- Ceuthomantis duellmani
- Filfil slippery frog (Conraua beccarii)
- Abo slippery frog (Conraua crassipes)
- Chiloe Island ground frog (Eupsophus calcaratus)
- Emilio's ground frog (Eupsophus emiliopugini)
- Rosy ground frog (Eupsophus roseus)
- Valdivia ground frog (Eupsophus vertebralis)
- Hadromophryne natalensis
- Eastern ghost frog (Heleophryne orientalis)
- Purcell's ghost frog (Heleophryne purcelli)
- Royal ghost frog (Heleophryne regis)
- Emerald forest frog (Hylorina sylvatica)
- Günther's leaping frog (Indirana brachytarsus)
- Brown leaping frog (Indirana semipalmata)
- Lankanectes corrugatus
- Rapids frog (Limnomedusa macroglossa)
- Wayanad dancing frog (Micrixalus saxicola)
- Nyctibatrachus petraeus
- Sierra Leone water frog (Odontobatrachus natator)
- Cameroon water frog (Petropedetes cameronensis)
- Johnston's water frog (Petropedetes johnstoni)
- Petropedetes newtonii
- Petropedetes parkeri
- Rimac water frog (Telmatobius rimac)

== Gymnophiona ==
Caecilians

- Eiselt's caecilian (Atretochoana eiselti)
- Boulenger's caecilian (Boulengerula boulengeri)
- Uluguru African caecilian (Boulengerula uluguruensis)
- Brasilotyphlus guarantanus
- Brazilian caecilian (Brasilotyphlus braziliensis)
- Brasilotyphlus dubium
- Bokermann's caecilian (Caecilia bokermanni)
- Rio Santiago caecilian (Caecilia disossea)
- Surinam caecilian (Caecilia gracilis)
- Günther's caecilian (Caecilia guntheri)
- Caecilia isthmica
- White-headed caecilian (Caecilia leucocephala)
- Mentens' caecilian (Caecilia mertensi)
- Rio Lita caecilian (Caecilia nigricans)
- La Bonita caecilian (Caecilia orientalis)
- Intac caecilian (Caecilia pachynema)
- Andagoya caecilian (Caecilia perdita)
- Moscopan caecilian (Caecilia subdermalis)
- Magdalena Valley caecilian (Caecilia subnigricans)
- Bearded caecilia (Caecilia tentaculata)
- Thompson's caecilian (Caecilia thompsoni)
- Cocle caecilian (Caecilia volcani)
- Alcock's chikila (Chikila alcocki)
- Kuttal caecilian (Chikila fulleri)
- Gaiduwan's chikila (Chikila gaiduwani)
- Chthonerpeton arii
- Argentine caecilian (Chthonerpeton indistinctum)
- Chthonerpeton noctinectes
- Santa Catarina caecilian (Chthonerpeton viviparum)
- Dermophis glandulosus
- Mexican caecilian (Dermophis mexicanus)
- Oaxacan caecilian (Dermophis oaxacae)
- Dermophis occidentalis
- La Loma caecilian (Dermophis parviceps)
- Two-coloured caecilian (Epicrionops bicolor)
- Peters' caecilian (Epicrionops petersi)
- Daniel's caecilian (Gegeneophis danieli)
- Forest caecilian (Gegeneophis ramaswamii)
- Seshachari's caecilian (Gegeneophis seshachari)
- Gaboon caecilian (Geotrypetes seraphini)
- Varagua caecilian (Gymnopis multiplicata)
- Congo caecilian (Herpele squalostoma)
- Banna caecilian (Ichthyophis bannanicus)
- Yellow-striped caecilian (Ichthyophis beddomei)
- Javan caecilian (Ichthyophis hypocyaneus)
- Kodagu striped ichthyophis (Ichthyophis kodaguensis)
- Ichthyophis lakimi
- Todaya caecilian (Ichthyophis mindanaoensis)
- Nguyen's caecilian (Ichthyophis nguyenorum)
- Yellow-banded caecilian (Ichthyophis paucisulcus)
- Ichthyophis pauli
- Darjeeling caecilian (Ichthyophis sikkimensis)
- Three-colored caecilian (Ichthyophis tricolor)
- Sao Paulo caecilian (Luetkenotyphlus brasiliensis)
- Insular caecilian (Luetkenotyphlus insulanus)
- Tiny white caecilian (Microcaecilia albiceps)
- Butantan microcaecilia (Microcaecilia butantan)
- Angoulême microcaecilia (Microcaecilia dermatophaga)
- Microcaecilia marvaleewakeae
- Honda caecilian (Microcaecilia nicefori)
- El Centro caecilian (Microcaecilia pricei)
- Microcaecilia rochai
- Tiny Taylor's caecilian (Microcaecilia taylori)
- Microcaecilia trombetas
- Tiny Cayenne caecilian (Microcaecilia unicolor)
- Upper Amazon caecilian (Nectocaecilia petersii)
- Pastaza river caecilian (Oscaecilia bassleri)
- Yellow-headed caecilian (Oscaecilia ochrocephala)
- Airstrip caecilian (Oscaecilia osae)
- New Granada caecilian (Oscaecilia polyzona)
- Kaup's caecilian (Potomotyphlus kaupii)
- Two banded caecilia (Rhinatrema bivittatum)
- Rhinatrema gilbertogili
- Black caecilian (Rhinatrema nigrum)
- Ron's rhinatrema (Rhinatrema ron)
- Rhinatrema uaiuai
- Witu caecilian (Schistometopum gregorii)
- Sao Tome caecilian (Schistometopum thomense)
- Lake Tanganyika caecilian (Scolecomorphus kirkii)
- Banded caecilian (Scolecomorphus vittatus)
- Ringed caecilia (Siphonops annulatus)
- Hardy's caecilian (Siphonops hardyi)
- Boettger's caecilian (Siphonops paulensis)
- Aleku caecilian (Sylvacaecilia grandisonae)
- Cayenne caecilian (Typhlonectes compressicauda)
- Rio Cauca caecilian (Typhlonectes natans)
- Bombay caecilian (Uraeotyphlus bombayensis)
- Kannan caecilian (Uraeotyphlus narayani)

== See also ==
- Lists of IUCN Red List least concern species
- List of near threatened amphibians
- List of vulnerable amphibians
- List of endangered amphibians
- List of critically endangered amphibians
- List of recently extinct amphibians
- List of data deficient amphibians
