= Pristimantis lythrodes =

Conservation status
- Least Concern (IUCN 3.1)

Scientific classification
- Kingdom: Animalia
- Phylum: Chordata
- Class: Amphibia
- Order: Anura
- Clade: Brachycephaloidea
- Family: Craugastoridae
- Genus: Pristimantis
- Species: P. lythrodes

Binomial name
- Pristimantis lythrodes (Lynch & Lescure, 1980)

Synonyms
- Eleutherodactylus lythrodes Lynch & Lescure, 1980

Species of frog

Pristimantis lythrodes, also known as Lescure's robber frog, is a species of frog in the family Strabomantidae. It is found in northern Peru (Loreto Region) and in southern Colombia (Amazonas Department) near the Peruvian border. Its natural habitats are tropical moist lowland forests and swamps.
