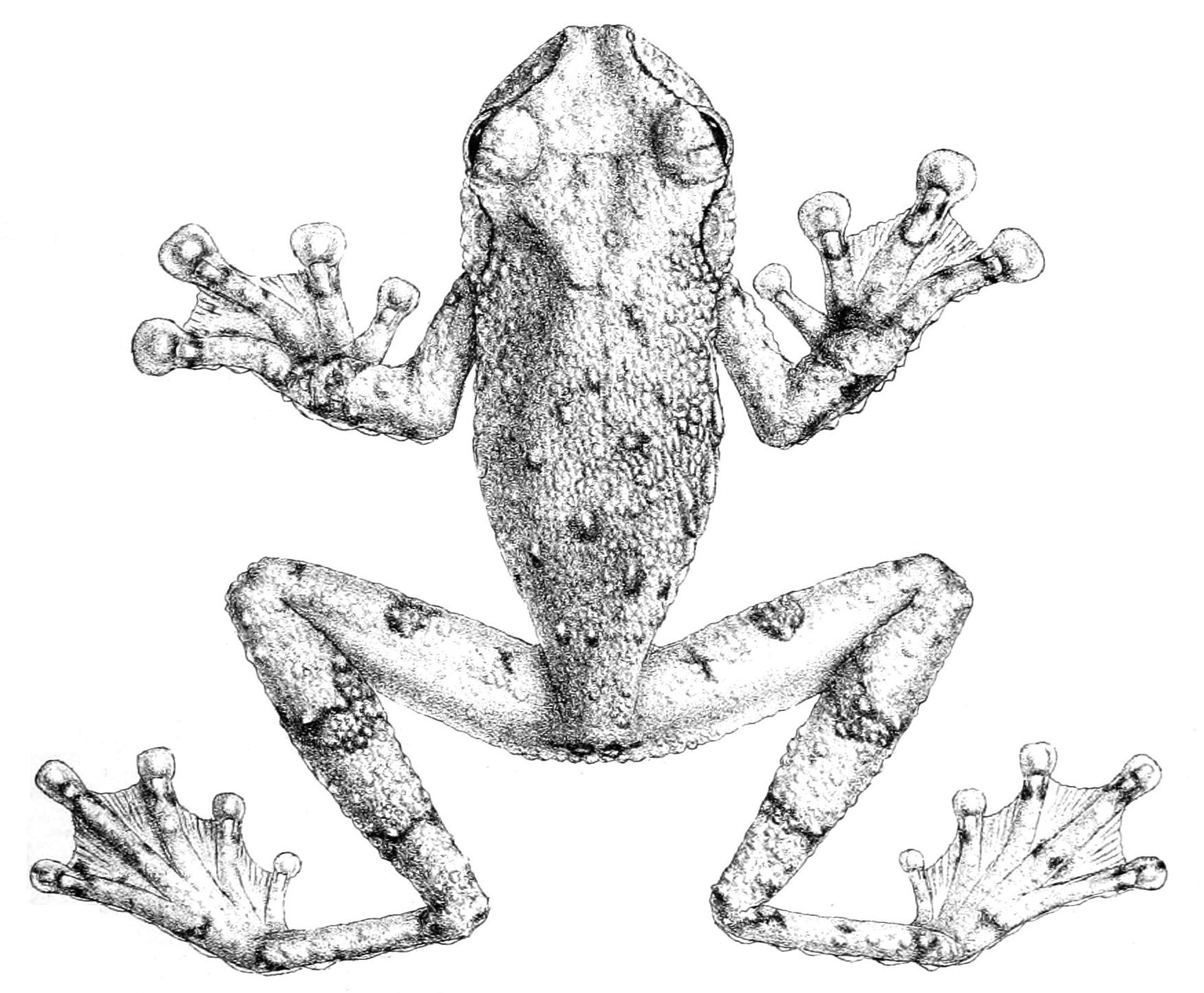

Conservation status
- Least Concern (IUCN 3.1)

Scientific classification
- Kingdom: Animalia
- Phylum: Chordata
- Class: Amphibia
- Order: Anura
- Family: Hylidae
- Genus: Tepuihyla
- Species: T. tuberculosa

Binomial name
- Tepuihyla tuberculosa (Boulenger, 1882)

Synonyms
- Hyla tuberculosa Boulenger, 1882; Ecnomiohyla tuberculosa (Boulenger, 1882)

= Tepuihyla tuberculosa =

Species of frog

Tepuihyla tuberculosa, commonly known as the Canelos treefrog, is a species of frog in the family Hylidae. It is found in the upper Amazon Basin in western Brazil, Colombia, Ecuador, and Peru. It is a rare canopy species found in primary forest; beyond the habitat requirements, its biology is unknown.
