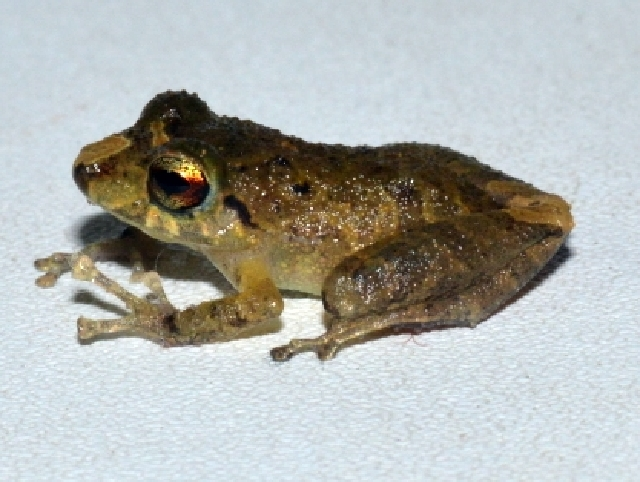

Conservation status
- Least Concern (IUCN 3.1)

Scientific classification
- Kingdom: Animalia
- Phylum: Chordata
- Class: Amphibia
- Order: Anura
- Family: Strabomantidae
- Genus: Pristimantis
- Subgenus: Pristimantis
- Species: P. viejas

Binomial name
- Pristimantis viejas (Lynch and Rueda-Almonacid, 1999)

Synonyms
- Eleutherodactylus viejas Lynch and Rueda-Almonacid, 1999

= Pristimantis viejas =

Species of frog

Pristimantis viejas is a species of frog in the family Strabomantidae. It is endemic to the Andes of Colombia and is known from eastern flanks/base of the northern Cordillera Central and from western flank of the Cordillera Oriental. The specific name viejas is a Spanish expression meaning "pretty young women", in reference to three biologist who had studied this species.

== Description ==
Adult males measure 15–19 mm (0.6–0.7 in) and adult females 24–29 mm (0.9–1.1 in) in snout–vent length. The snout is long, subacuminate in dorsal view, and rounded in lateral profile. The tympanum is round and prominent. The fingers and the toes have lateral fringes and round terminal discs but no webbing. Dorsal skin has many non-conical tubercles. The dorsum is copper brown. There are irregular spots that are cream, nearly black, or orange. The flanks are dark brown with paler slanting stripes. The posterior/hidden surfaces of the thighs are dark brown with orange spot. The venter is almost white to pinkish. Grey marbling may be present on the throat. The iris is pale copper to reddish-copper, with thick black reticulation.

== Habitat and conservation ==
Pristimantis viejas occurs in sub-Andean forests at elevations of 565–1,880 m (1,854–6,168 ft) above sea level. Individuals can be found under bushes, in forest edge, secondary forest, and in open areas in forests. It is nocturnal. Breeding occurs through direct development (i.e., there is no free-living larval stage).

Pristimantis viejas is a common and adaptable species that seems to benefit from a degree of disturbance to forest habitats. It is not facing any significant threats.
