= Trachycephalus venezolanus =

Conservation status
- Least Concern (IUCN 3.1)

Scientific classification
- Kingdom: Animalia
- Phylum: Chordata
- Class: Amphibia
- Order: Anura
- Family: Hylidae
- Genus: Trachycephalus
- Species: T. venezolanus

Binomial name
- Trachycephalus venezolanus (Mertens, 1950)

Synonyms
- Aparasphenodon venezolanus (Mertens, 1950)

Species of frog

Trachycephalus venezolanus is a species of frog in the family Hylidae. It is found in Brazil, Colombia, and Venezuela. Its natural habitats are subtropical or tropical moist lowland forests, subtropical or tropical swamps, intermittent freshwater lakes, and freshwater marshes. It is threatened by habitat loss.
