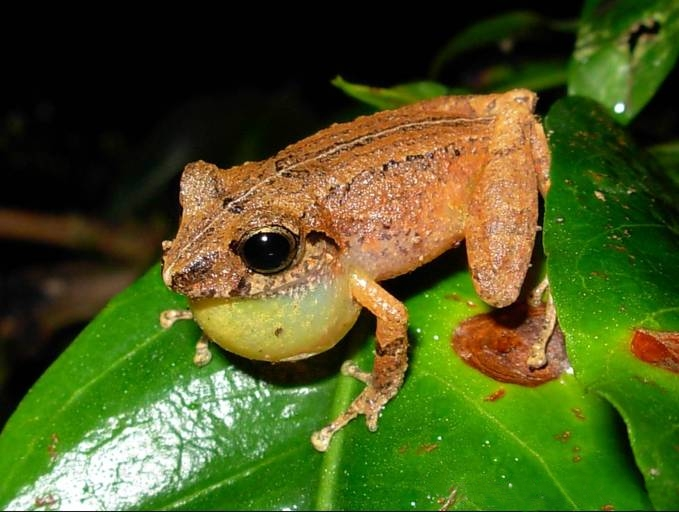

Conservation status
- Least Concern (IUCN 3.1)

Scientific classification
- Kingdom: Animalia
- Phylum: Chordata
- Class: Amphibia
- Order: Anura
- Clade: Brachycephaloidea
- Family: Craugastoridae
- Genus: Pristimantis
- Species: P. boulengeri

Binomial name
- Pristimantis boulengeri (Lynch, 1981)

Synonyms
- Eleutherodactylus boulengeri Lynch, 1981

= Pristimantis boulengeri =

Species of frog

Pristimantis boulengeri is a species of frog in the family Strabomantidae. It is endemic to Colombia. Its natural habitats are tropical moist montane forests, arable land, pastureland, plantations, rural gardens, urban areas, heavily degraded former forest, irrigated land, and seasonally flooded agricultural land.
