= Pristimantis nicefori =

Conservation status
- Least Concern (IUCN 3.1)

Scientific classification
- Kingdom: Animalia
- Phylum: Chordata
- Class: Amphibia
- Order: Anura
- Clade: Brachycephaloidea
- Family: Craugastoridae
- Genus: Pristimantis
- Species: P. nicefori

Binomial name
- Pristimantis nicefori (Cochran and Goin, 1970)

Synonyms
- Eleutherodactylus nicefori Cochran and Goin, 1970

Species of amphibian

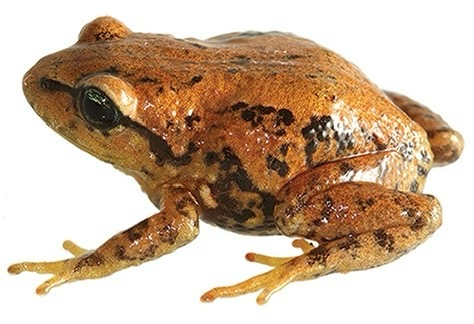
Pristimantis nicefori

Pristimantis nicefori is a species of frog in the family Strabomantidae.

== Distribution and habitat ==
It is found in Colombia and Venezuela. Its natural habitat is tropical high-altitude grassland. It is threatened by habitat loss.
