= Pristimantis incomptus =

Conservation status
- Least Concern (IUCN 3.1)

Scientific classification
- Kingdom: Animalia
- Phylum: Chordata
- Class: Amphibia
- Order: Anura
- Clade: Brachycephaloidea
- Family: Craugastoridae
- Genus: Pristimantis
- Species: P. incomptus

Binomial name
- Pristimantis incomptus (Lynch & Duellman, 1980)

Synonyms
- Eleutherodactylus incomptus Lynch & Duellman, 1980; Eleutherodactylus kirklandi Flores, 1985

Species of frog

Pristimantis incomptus is a species of frog in the family Strabomantidae. It is found in Ecuador and Peru. Its natural habitat is tropical moist montane forests. It is threatened by habitat loss.
