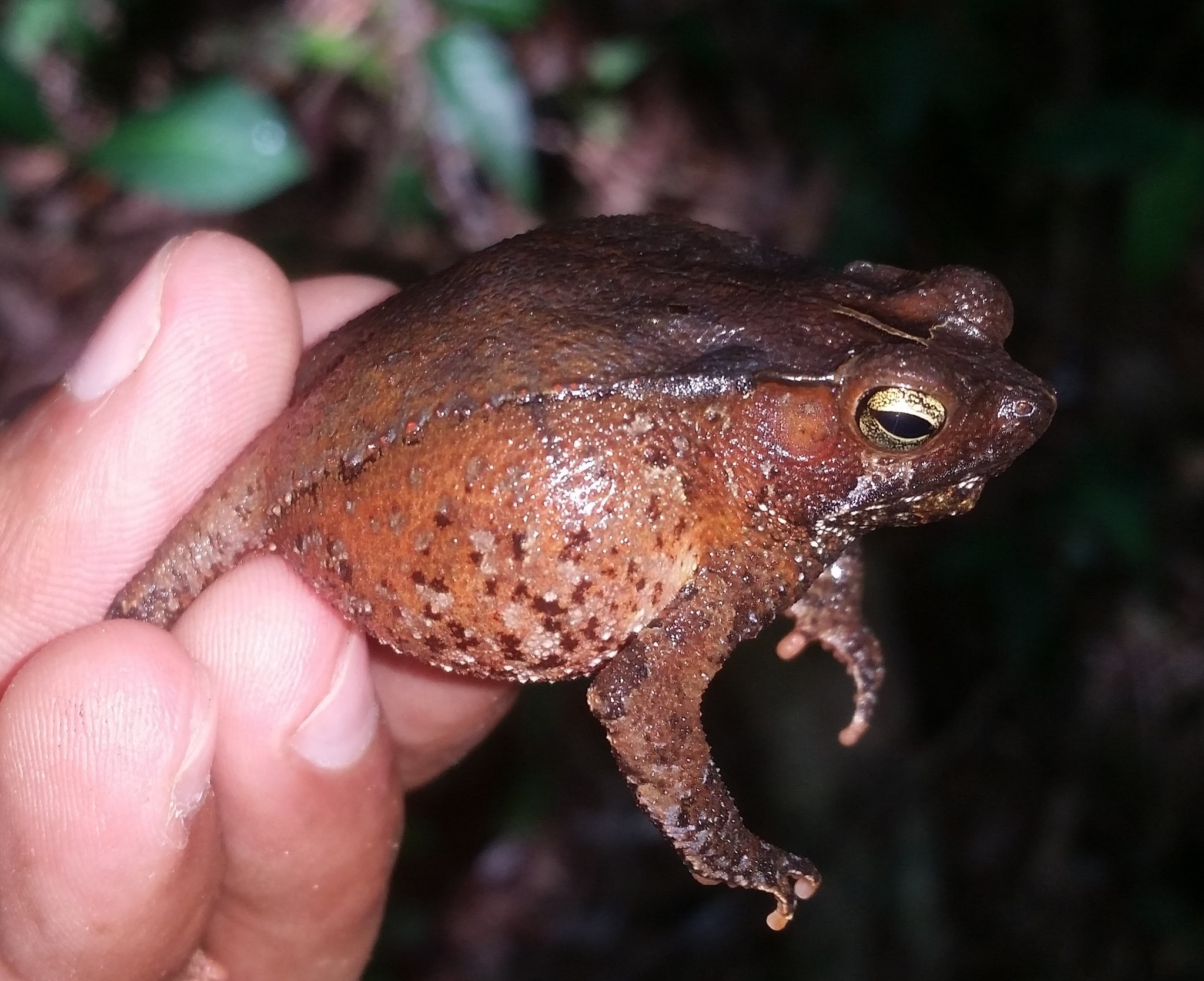

Conservation status
- Least Concern (IUCN 3.1)

Scientific classification
- Kingdom: Animalia
- Phylum: Chordata
- Class: Amphibia
- Order: Anura
- Family: Bufonidae
- Genus: Rhinella
- Species: R. sternosignata

Binomial name
- Rhinella sternosignata (Gunther, 1858)

Synonyms
- Bufo sternosignatus Gunther, 1858

= Rhinella sternosignata =

Species of amphibian

Rhinella sternosignatus is a species of toad in the family Bufonidae. It is found in Colombia and Venezuela. Its natural habitats are subtropical or tropical moist lowland forests, subtropical or tropical moist montane forests, rivers, freshwater marshes, and intermittent freshwater marshes. It is threatened by habitat loss.
