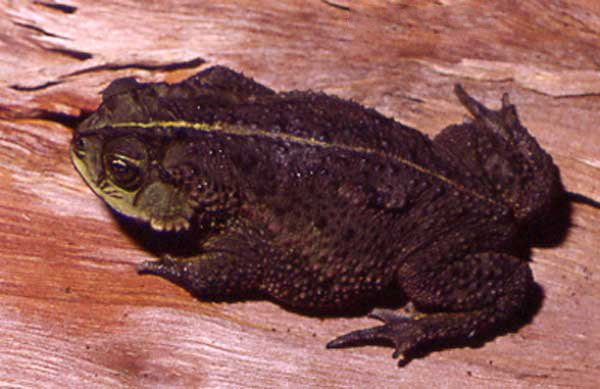

Conservation status
- Least Concern (IUCN 3.1)

Scientific classification
- Kingdom: Animalia
- Phylum: Chordata
- Class: Amphibia
- Order: Anura
- Family: Bufonidae
- Genus: Rhinella
- Species: R. fernandezae

Binomial name
- Rhinella fernandezae (Gallardo, 1957)

Synonyms
- Bufo fernandezae

= Rhinella fernandezae =

Species of amphibian

Rhinella fernandezae is a species of toad in the family Bufonidae that is found in Argentina, Brazil, Paraguay, and Uruguay. Its natural habitats are subtropical or tropical dry lowland grassland, subtropical or tropical seasonally wet or flooded lowland grassland, intermittent freshwater marshes, coastal freshwater lagoons, arable land, pastureland, plantations, and seasonally flooded agricultural land.
