= Rhinella nicefori =

Conservation status
- Endangered (IUCN 3.1)

Scientific classification
- Kingdom: Animalia
- Phylum: Chordata
- Class: Amphibia
- Order: Anura
- Family: Bufonidae
- Genus: Rhinella
- Species: R. nicefori

Binomial name
- Rhinella nicefori (Cochran & Goin, 1970)

Synonyms
- Rhamphophryne nicefori (Cochran & Goin, 1970)

Species of amphibian

Rhinella nicefori is a species of toad in the family Bufonidae. It is endemic to Colombia. Its natural habitat is subtropical or tropical high-altitude grassland. It is threatened by habitat loss.
