= Rhinella ruizi =

Conservation status
- Vulnerable (IUCN 3.1)

Scientific classification
- Kingdom: Animalia
- Phylum: Chordata
- Class: Amphibia
- Order: Anura
- Family: Bufonidae
- Genus: Rhinella
- Species: R. ruizi

Binomial name
- Rhinella ruizi (Grant, 2000)

Synonyms
- Rhamphophryne ruizi Grant, 2000 "1999"

Species of amphibian

Rhinella ruizi is a species of toad in the family Bufonidae. It is endemic to the Cordillera Central in Antioquia, Colombia. The specific name ruizi honors Ruiz-Carranza, a Colombian herpetologist.

== Description ==
Adult males measure 36–39 mm (1.4–1.5 in) and adult females 39–50 mm (1.5–2.0 in) in snout–vent length. The head is triangular and slightly wider than it is long. The snout is acuminate, sometimes bulbous. The tympanum is absent. The parotoid glands are well-developed. The fingers and the toes are short, webbed, and have bulbous tips. The dorsum varies from brown to dark brown to reddish brown. The vertebral line is yellow, green, or cream-colored and is lined with black.

== Habitat and conservation ==
Rhinella ruizi occurs in high-Andean interior forests at elevations of 2,330–3,100 m (7,640–10,170 ft) above sea level. Development is probably direct (i.e., there is no free-living larval stage). It is a common species within its range and it may tolerate a low degree of habitat perturbation. The main threats to it are habitat loss and degradation caused by agriculture, livestock, and urban expansion.
