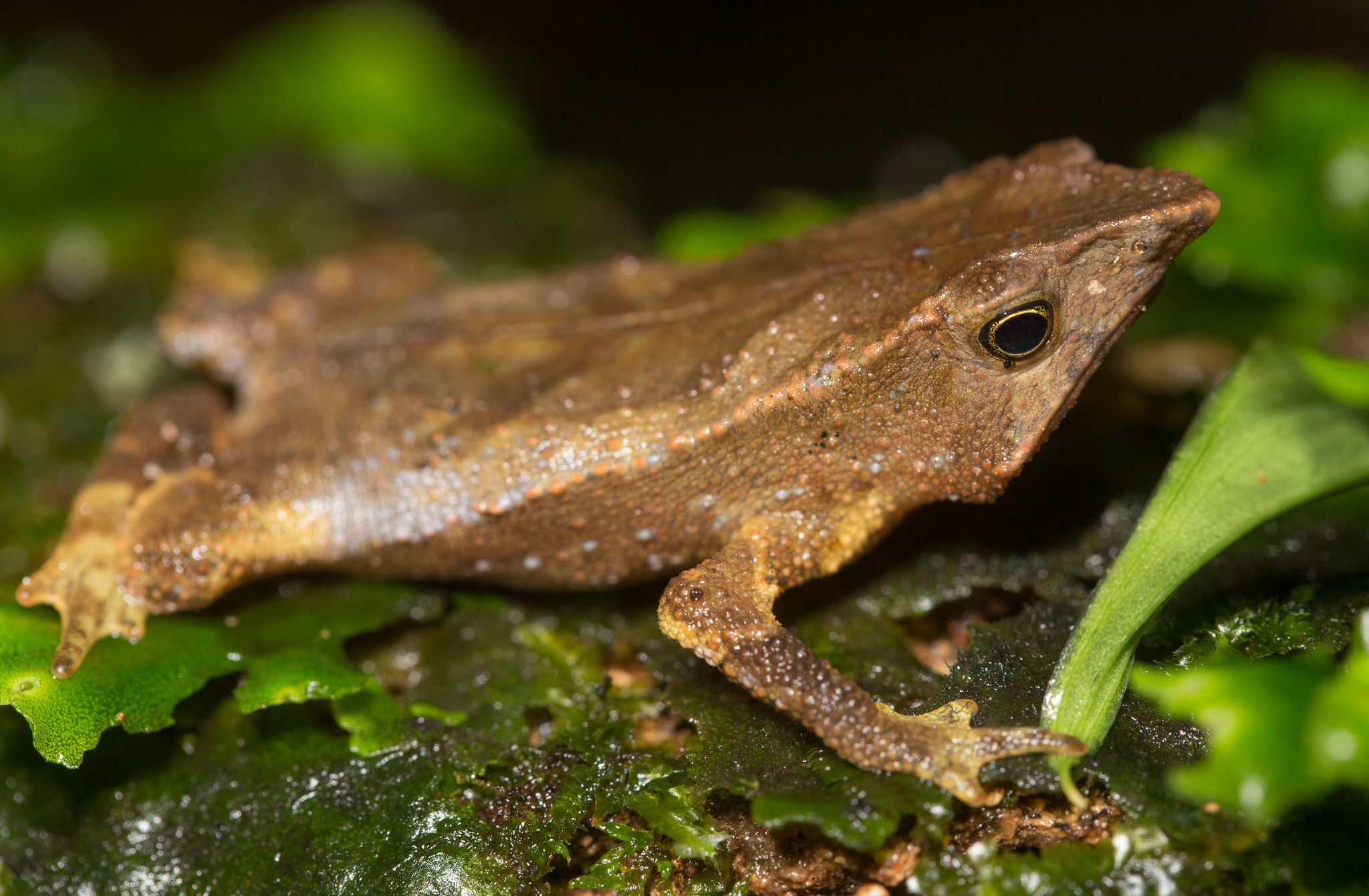

Conservation status
- Least Concern (IUCN 3.1)

Scientific classification
- Kingdom: Animalia
- Phylum: Chordata
- Class: Amphibia
- Order: Anura
- Family: Bufonidae
- Genus: Rhinella
- Species: R. festae

Binomial name
- Rhinella festae (Peracca, 1904)

Synonyms
- Rhamphophryne festae (Peracca, 1904)

= Rhinella festae =

Species of amphibian

Rhinella festae is a species of toad in the family Bufonidae. It is found in Ecuador and Peru. Its natural habitats are subtropical or tropical moist lowland forests and subtropical or tropical moist montane forests. It is threatened by habitat loss.
