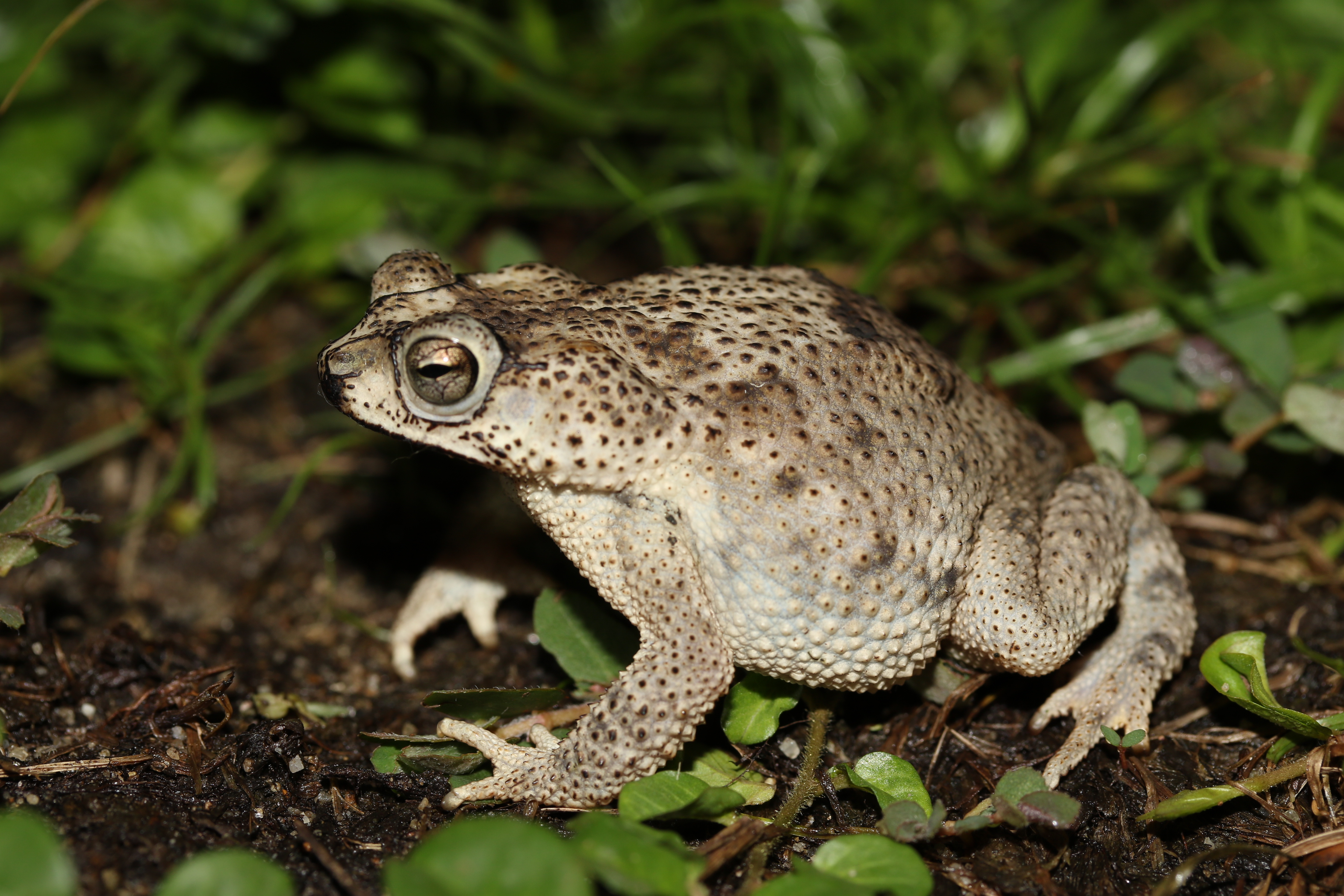

Conservation status
- Least Concern (IUCN 3.1)

Scientific classification
- Kingdom: Animalia
- Phylum: Chordata
- Class: Amphibia
- Order: Anura
- Family: Bufonidae
- Genus: Rhinella
- Species: R. humboldti

Binomial name
- Rhinella humboldti (Gallardo, 1965)

Synonyms
- Bufo granulosus humboldti Gallardo, 1965; Bufo beebei Gallardo, 1965; Chaunus beebei (Gallardo, 1965); Rhinella beebei (Gallardo, 1965)

= Rhinella humboldti =

Species of amphibian

Rhinella humboldti (common name: Rivero's toad) is a species of toad in the family Bufonidae. It is found in Colombia, Venezuela, Trinidad, and the Guianas. This species was originally considered to be a subspecies of Rhinella granulosa (as Bufo granulosus humboldti).

Rhinella humboldti is an abundant species. It is generally a terrestrial toad found in lowland plains, savanna, and dry forests. It can penetrate into forests by following roads and lumber tracts. On Trinidad, it is found in cane fields, rice fields, and other open agricultural areas. Breeding takes place in temporary and permanent ponds.
