= Rhinella tenrec =

Conservation status
- Endangered (IUCN 3.1)

Scientific classification
- Kingdom: Animalia
- Phylum: Chordata
- Class: Amphibia
- Order: Anura
- Family: Bufonidae
- Genus: Rhinella
- Species: R. tenrec

Binomial name
- Rhinella tenrec Lynch & Renjifo, 1990

Synonyms
- Rhamphophryne tenrec

Species of amphibian

Rhinella tenrec is a species of toad in the family Bufonidae. It is endemic to Colombia. Its natural habitat is subtropical or tropical moist lowland forests. It is threatened by habitat loss.
