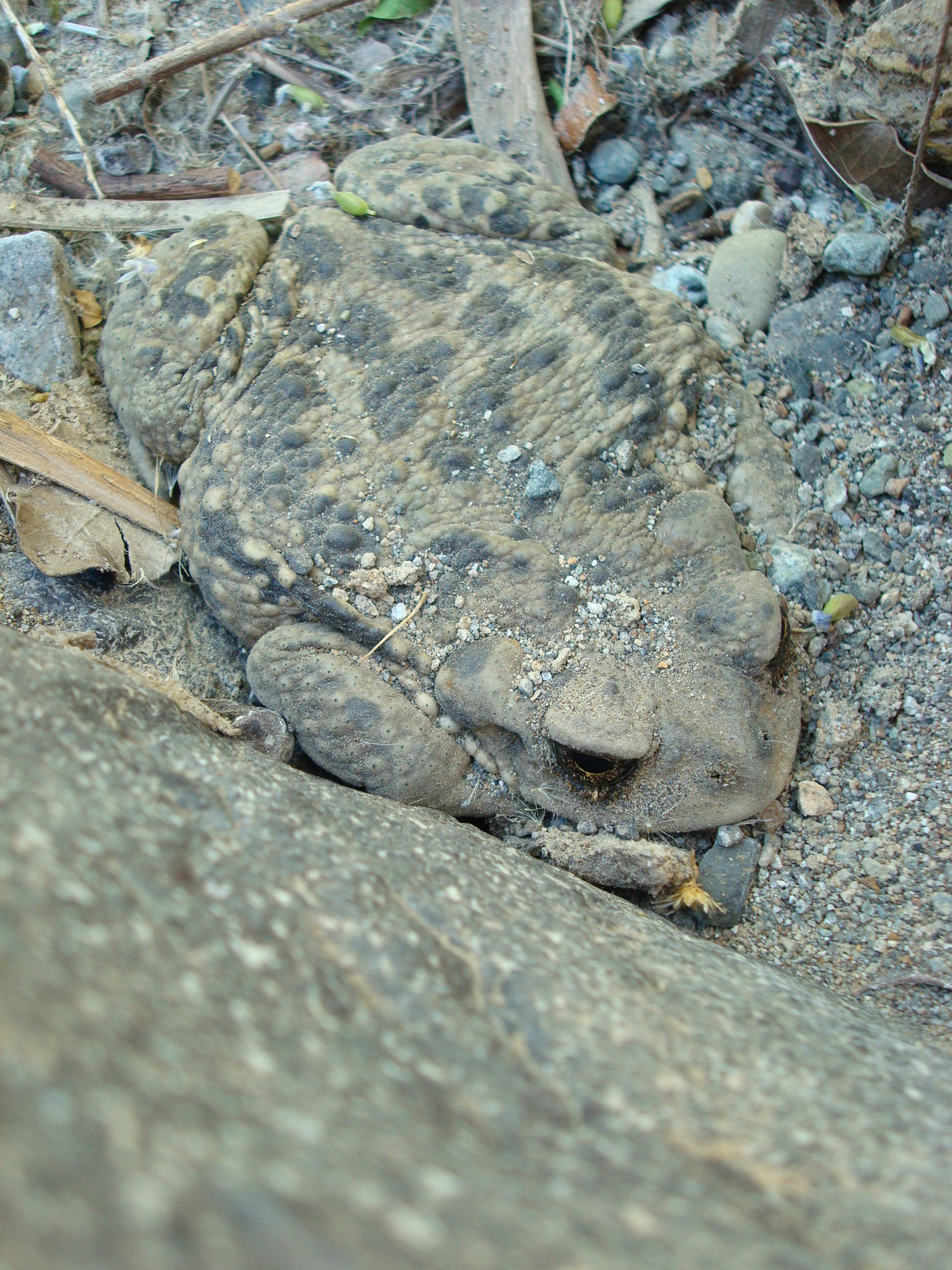

Conservation status
- Near Threatened (IUCN 3.1)

Scientific classification
- Kingdom: Animalia
- Phylum: Chordata
- Class: Amphibia
- Order: Anura
- Family: Bufonidae
- Genus: Rhinella
- Species: R. arunco

Binomial name
- Rhinella arunco (Molina, 1782)

Synonyms
- Bufo chilensis Tschudi, 1838; Bufo arunco Schneider, 1799; Chaunus arunco (Molina 1782)

= Rhinella arunco =

Species of amphibian

Rhinella arunco is a species of toad in the family Bufonidae that is endemic to Chile. Its natural habitats are subtropical or tropical dry shrubland, rivers, intermittent rivers, freshwater marshes, intermittent freshwater marshes, water storage areas, ponds, aquaculture ponds, open excavations, and irrigated land. It is threatened by habitat loss.

== Sources ==
- Frost, D. R.; Grant, T.; Faivovich, J. N.; Bain, R. H.; Haas, A.; Haddad, C. L. F. B.; De Sá, R. O.; Channing, A.; Wilkinson, M.; Donnellan, S. C.; Raxworthy, C. J.; Campbell, J. A.; Blotto, B. L.; Moler, P.; Drewes, R. C.; Nussbaum, R. A.; Lynch, J. D.; Green, D. M.; Wheeler, W. C. (2006). "The Amphibian Tree of Life". Bulletin of the American Museum of Natural History. 297: 1–291. doi:10.1206/0003-0090(2006)297[0001:TATOL]2.0.CO;2. hdl:2246/5781.
