= Rhinella bergi =

Conservation status
- Least Concern (IUCN 3.1)

Scientific classification
- Kingdom: Animalia
- Phylum: Chordata
- Class: Amphibia
- Order: Anura
- Family: Bufonidae
- Genus: Rhinella
- Species: R. bergi

Binomial name
- Rhinella bergi (Céspedez, 2000)

Synonyms
- Bufo bergi; Chaunus bergi

Species of amphibian

Rhinella bergi is a species of toad in the family Bufonidae that is found in Argentina, Brazil, and Paraguay. Its natural habitats are dry savanna, moist savanna, subtropical or tropical seasonally wet or flooded lowland grassland, freshwater marshes, intermittent freshwater marshes, arable land, pastureland, and ponds. It is threatened by habitat loss.
