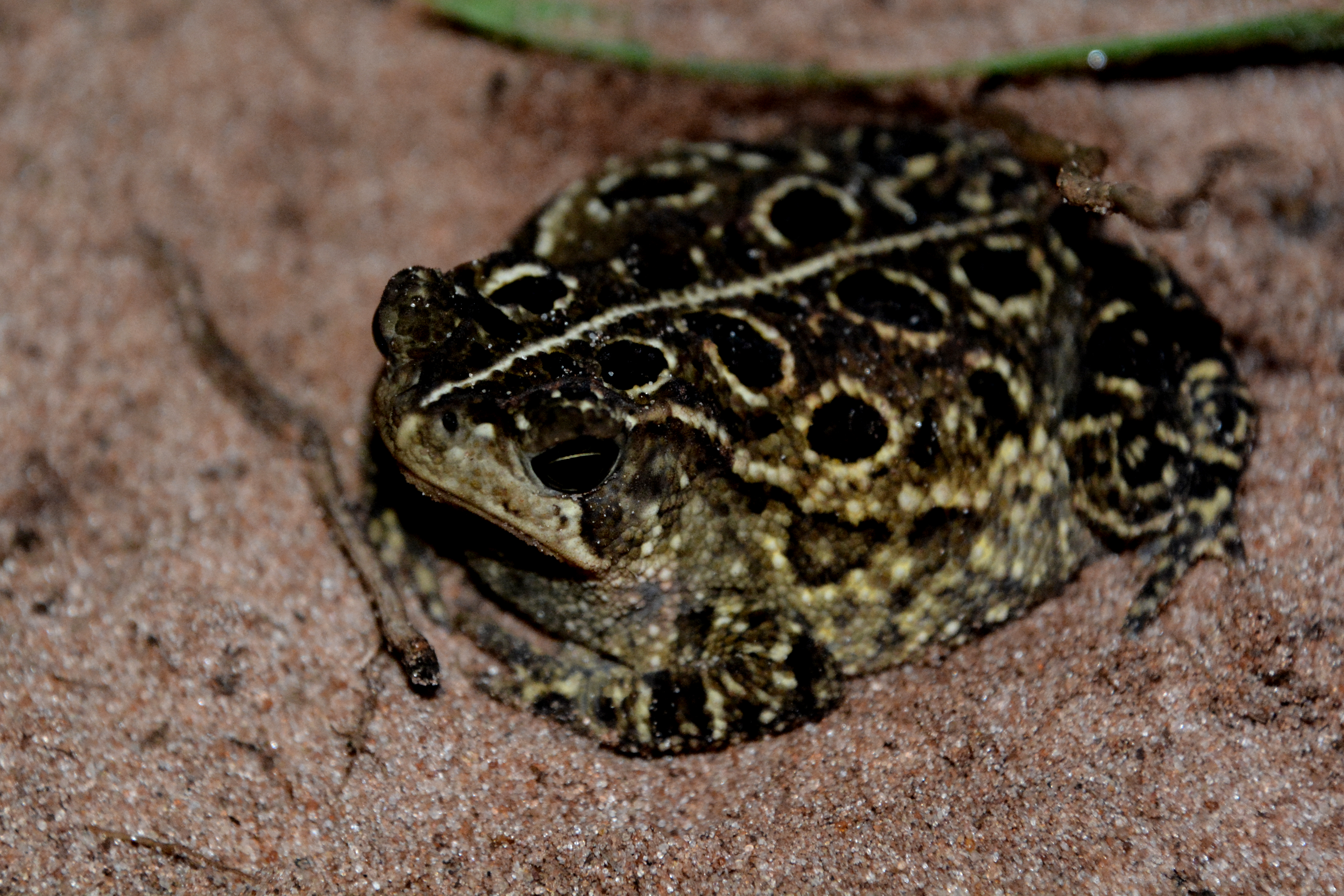

Conservation status
- Least Concern (IUCN 3.1)

Scientific classification
- Kingdom: Animalia
- Phylum: Chordata
- Class: Amphibia
- Order: Anura
- Family: Bufonidae
- Genus: Rhinella
- Species: R. ocellata

Binomial name
- Rhinella ocellata (Günther, 1858)

Synonyms
- Bufo ocellatus Günther, 1858

= Rhinella ocellata =

Species of amphibian

Rhinella ocellata is a species of toad in the family Bufonidae. It is endemic to Brazil. Its natural habitats are moist savanna, subtropical or tropical moist shrubland, subtropical or tropical high-altitude shrubland, rivers, intermittent rivers, freshwater marshes, and intermittent freshwater marshes. It is threatened by habitat loss.
