= Rhinella vellardi =

Alto Marañon toad

Conservation status
- Endangered (IUCN 3.1)

Scientific classification
- Kingdom: Animalia
- Phylum: Chordata
- Class: Amphibia
- Order: Anura
- Family: Bufonidae
- Genus: Rhinella
- Species: R. vellardi

Binomial name
- Rhinella vellardi Leviton & Duellman, 1978

Synonyms
- Bufo spinulosus orientalis Vellard, 1959; Bufo vellardi Leviton and Duellman, 1978; Chaunus vellardi (Leviton and Duellman, 1978)

Species of toad

Rhinella vellardi, the Alto Marañon toad, is a species of toad in the family Bufonidae that is endemic to Peru. It is only known from the type locality in the upper Marañón area, Cajamarca Region of northern Peru. Its natural habitat is montane forest in the upper Amazon basin. It is a rare species of which little is known.
