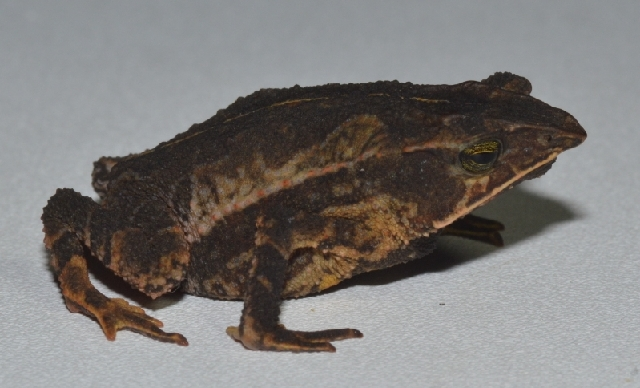

Conservation status
- Vulnerable (IUCN 3.1)

Scientific classification
- Kingdom: Animalia
- Phylum: Chordata
- Class: Amphibia
- Order: Anura
- Family: Bufonidae
- Genus: Rhinella
- Species: R. macrorhina

Binomial name
- Rhinella macrorhina (Trueb, 1971)

Synonyms
- Rhamphophryne macrorhina Trueb, 1971

= Rhinella macrorhina =

Species of amphibian

Rhinella macrorhina is a species of toad in the family Bufonidae. It is endemic to Colombia. Its natural habitat is subtropical or tropical moist montane forests. It is threatened by habitat loss.
