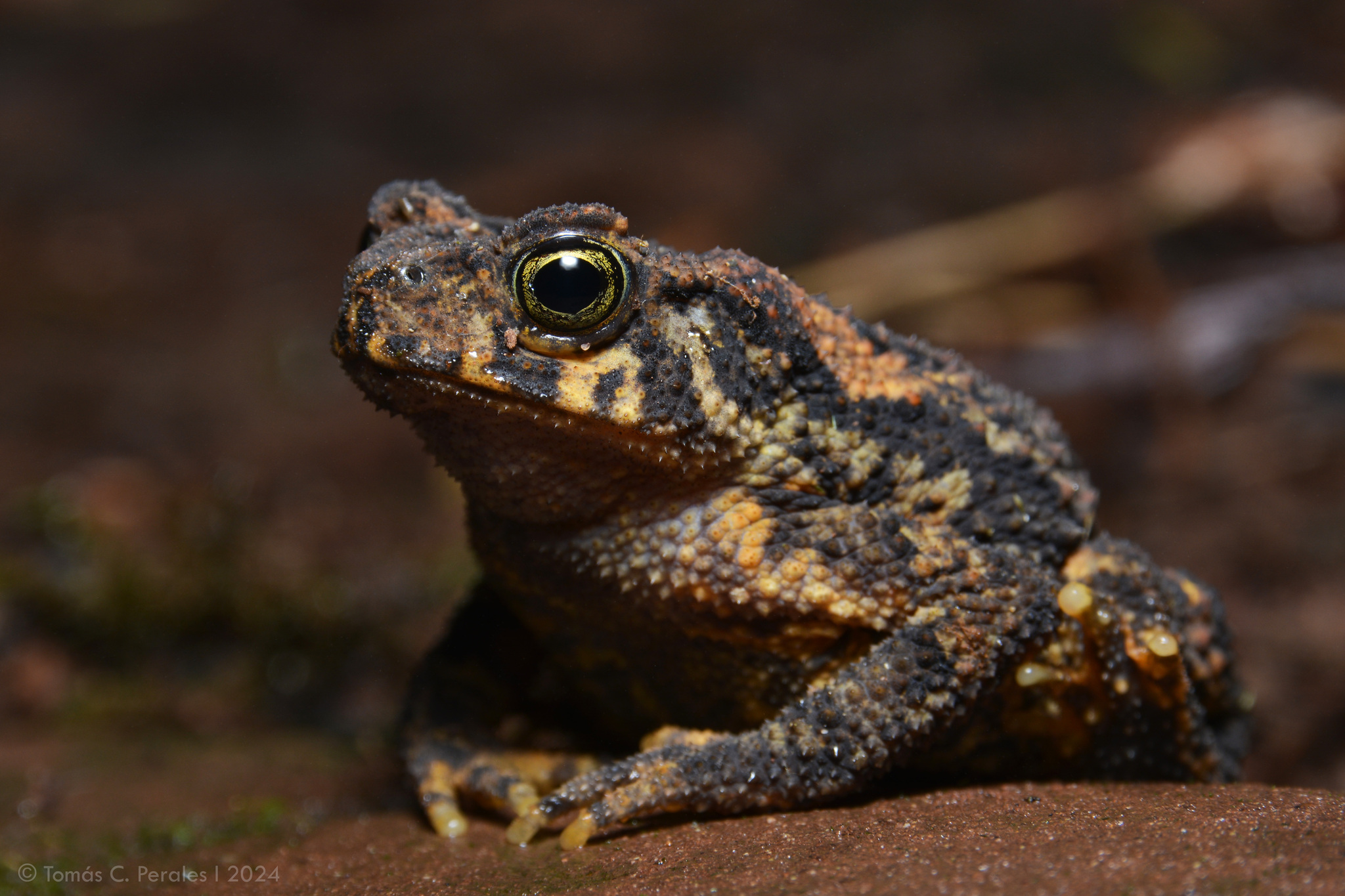

Conservation status
- Near Threatened (IUCN 3.1)

Scientific classification
- Kingdom: Animalia
- Phylum: Chordata
- Class: Amphibia
- Order: Anura
- Family: Bufonidae
- Genus: Rhinella
- Species: R. rumbolli

Binomial name
- Rhinella rumbolli (Carrizo, 1992)

Synonyms
- Bufo rumbolli

= Rhinella rumbolli =

Species of amphibian

Rhinella rumbolli is a species of toad in the family Bufonidae that is found in Argentina and possibly Bolivia. Its natural habitats are temperate forests and rivers. It is threatened by habitat loss.

== Sources ==
- Frost, D. R.; Grant, T.; Faivovich, J. N.; Bain, R. H.; Haas, A.; Haddad, C. L. F. B.; De Sá, R. O.; Channing, A.; Wilkinson, M.; Donnellan, S. C.; Raxworthy, C. J.; Campbell, J. A.; Blotto, B. L.; Moler, P.; Drewes, R. C.; Nussbaum, R. A.; Lynch, J. D.; Green, D. M.; Wheeler, W. C. (2006). "The Amphibian Tree of Life". Bulletin of the American Museum of Natural History. 297: 1–291. doi:10.1206/0003-0090(2006)297[0001:TATOL]2.0.CO;2. hdl:2246/5781.
