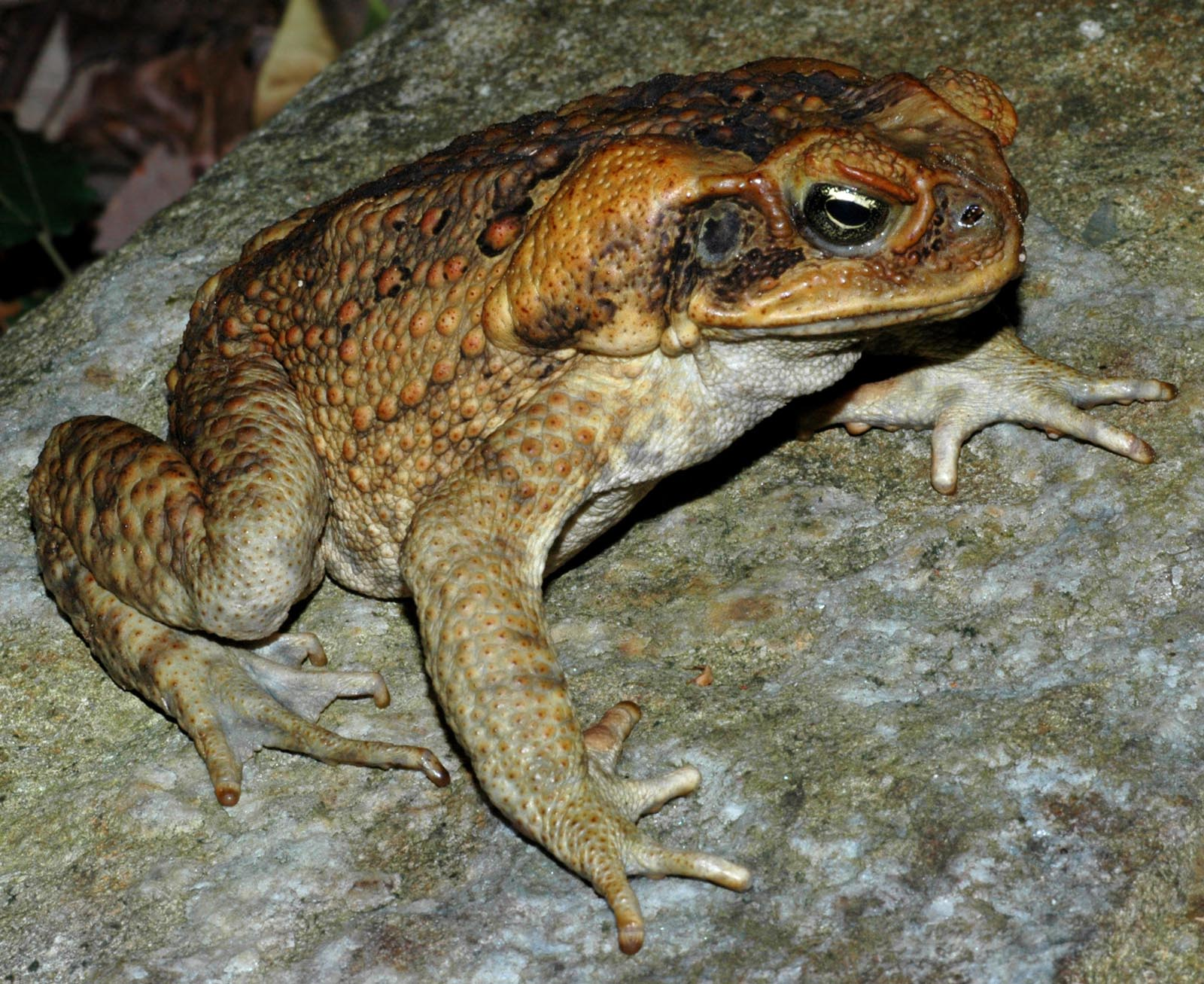
- Cane toad (Rhinella marina)

Scientific classification
- Kingdom: Animalia
- Phylum: Chordata
- Class: Amphibia
- Order: Anura
- Family: Bufonidae
- Genus: Rhinella; Fitzinger, 1826

Type species
- Rhinella proboscidea Spix, 1824

Species
- 95 species; see table

Synonyms
- Chaunus Wagler, 1828; Rhamphophryne Trueb, 1971

= Rhinella =

Genus of amphibians

Rhinella, commonly known as South American toads, beaked toads or Rio Viejo toads, is a genus of true toads native to Neotropical parts of Mexico, Central and South America. Additionally, the cane toad has been Introduced to Australia, the Caribbean, the Philippines and elsewhere.

Originally, all species of the genus Rhinella were included in the genus Bufo, then they were split into the genera Chaunus and Rhamphophryne. However, Chaunus and Rhamphophryne are now considered synonyms of Rhinella.

== Etymology ==
- Rhinella means 'little nose', from rhino- (ῥῑνο-), the combining form of the Ancient Greek rhis (ῥίς, 'nose') and the Latin diminutive suffix -ella.
- Chaunus is the Latinised form of the Ancient Greek chaûnos (χαῦνος, 'porous, spongy').
- Rhamphophryne, meaning "beaked toad", is from rhamphos (ῥάµϕος, 'beak') and phrunē (φρύνη, 'toad').

== Species ==
There are about 94 living species recognised in the genus Rhinella:

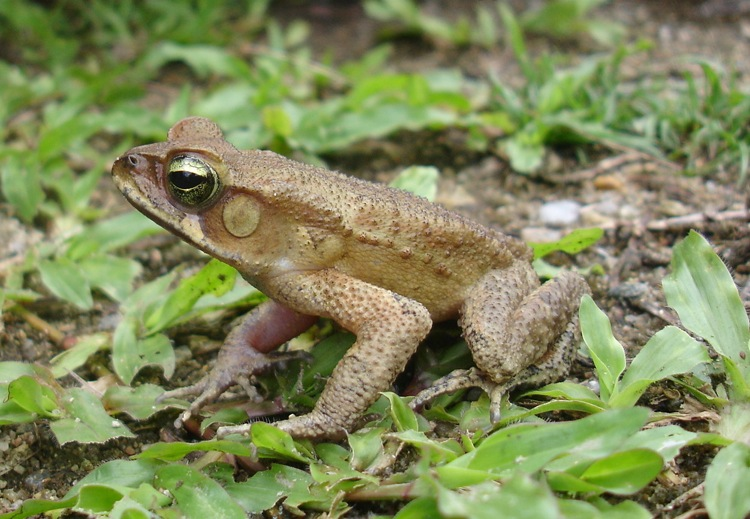
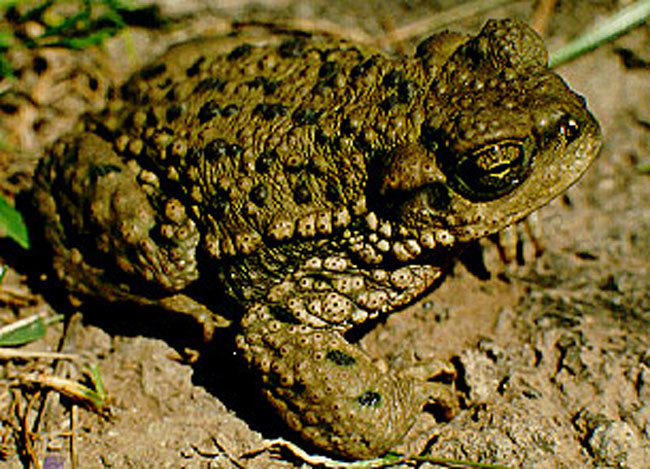
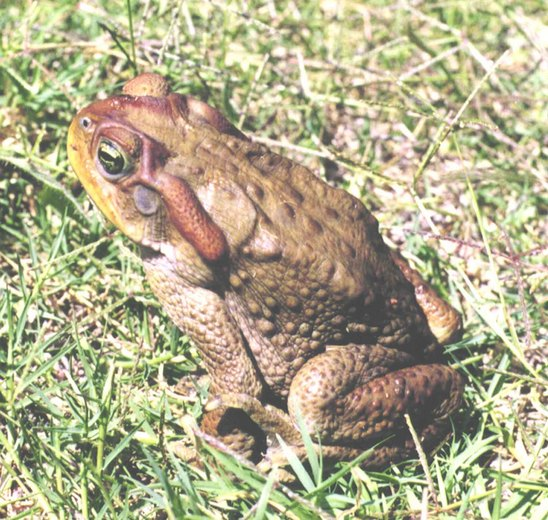
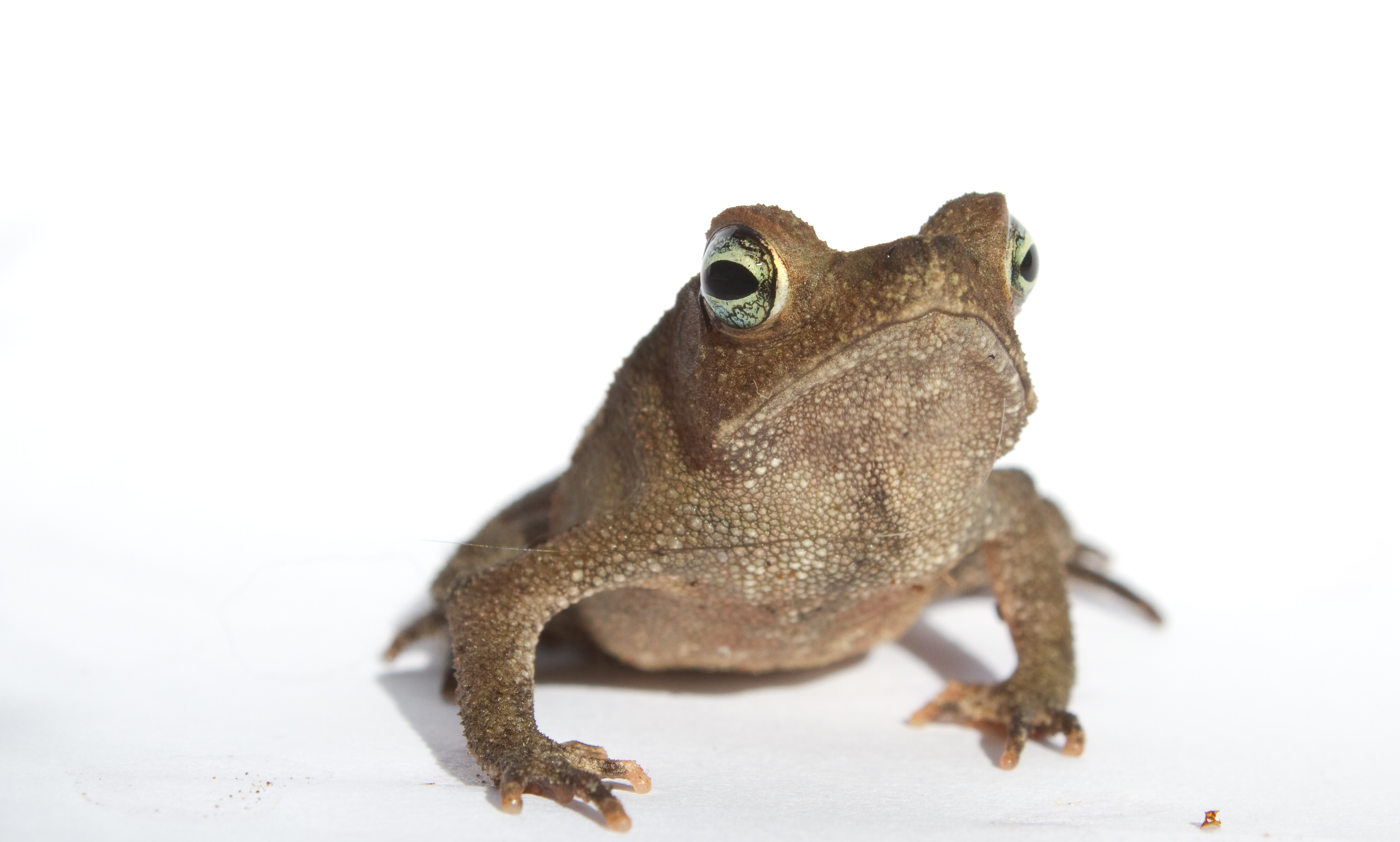
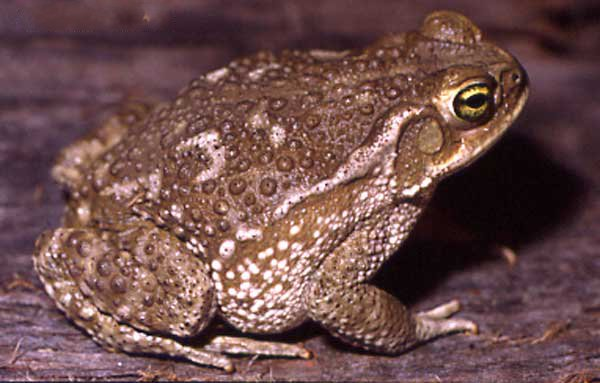
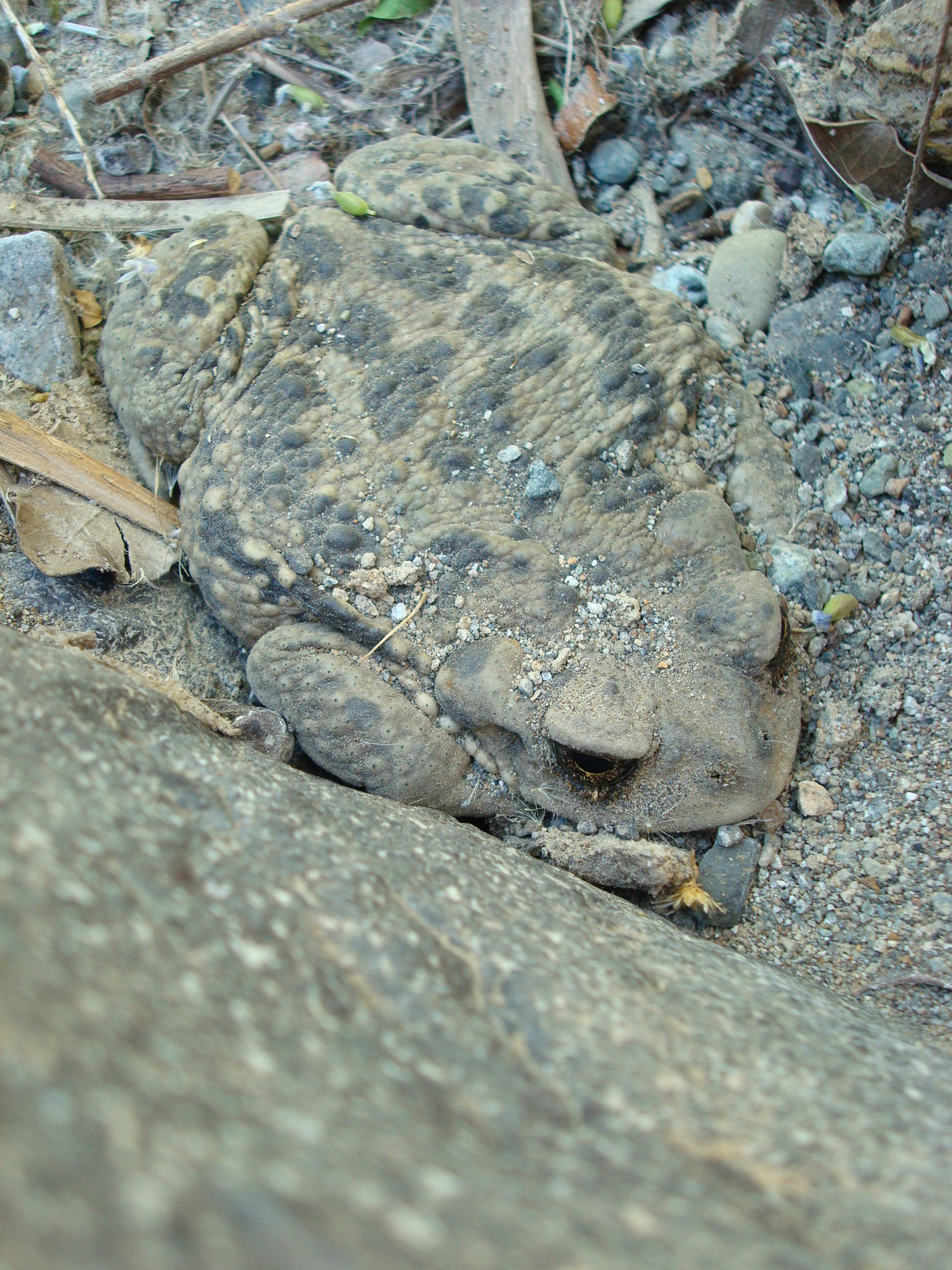
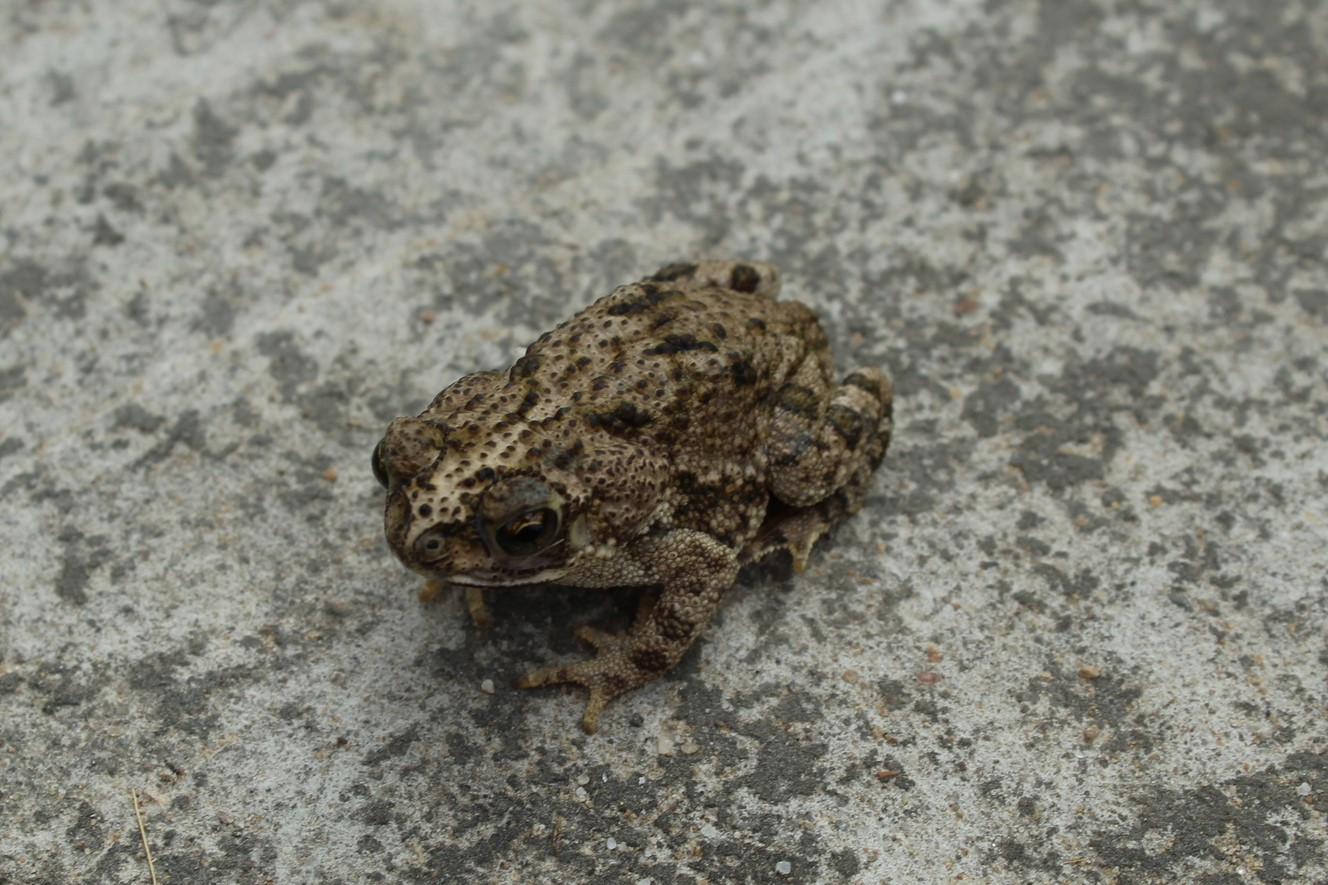
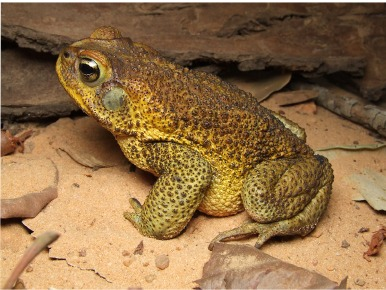
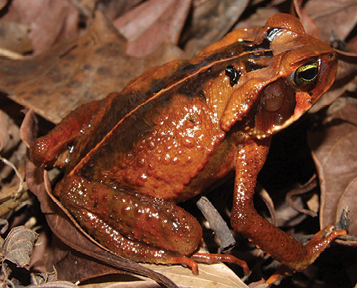
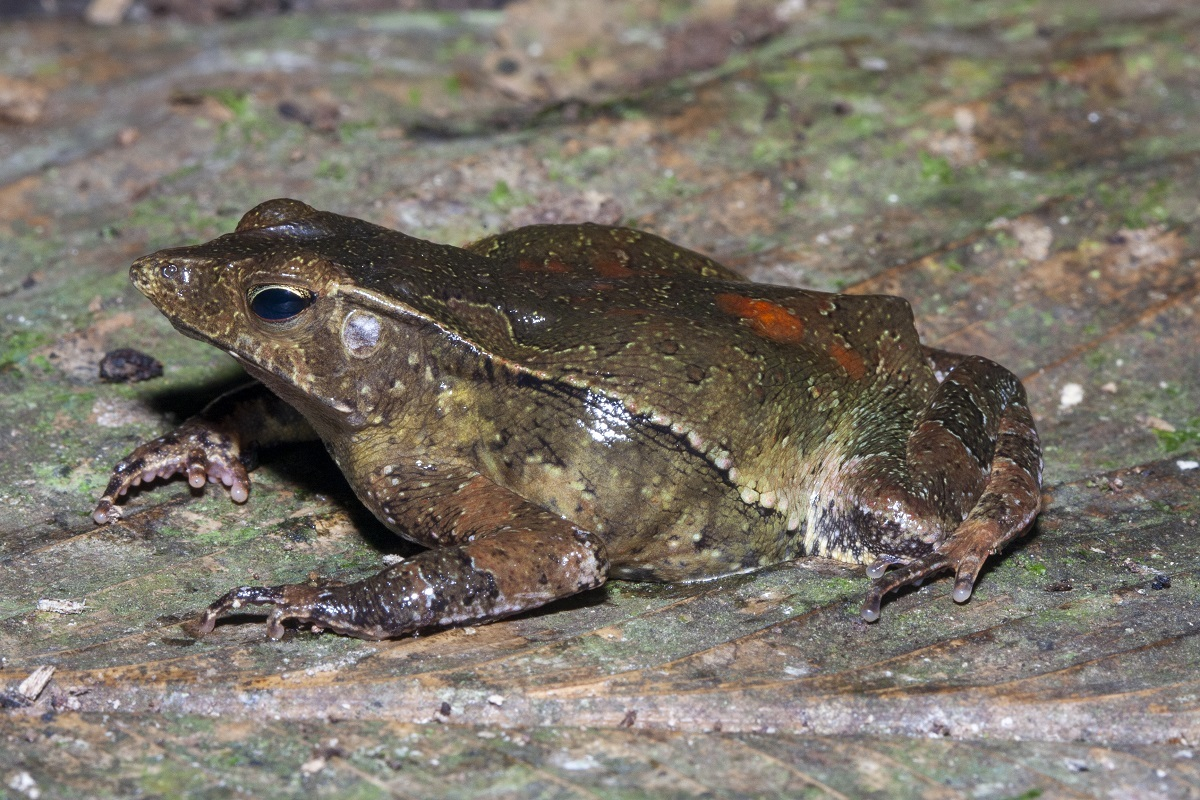
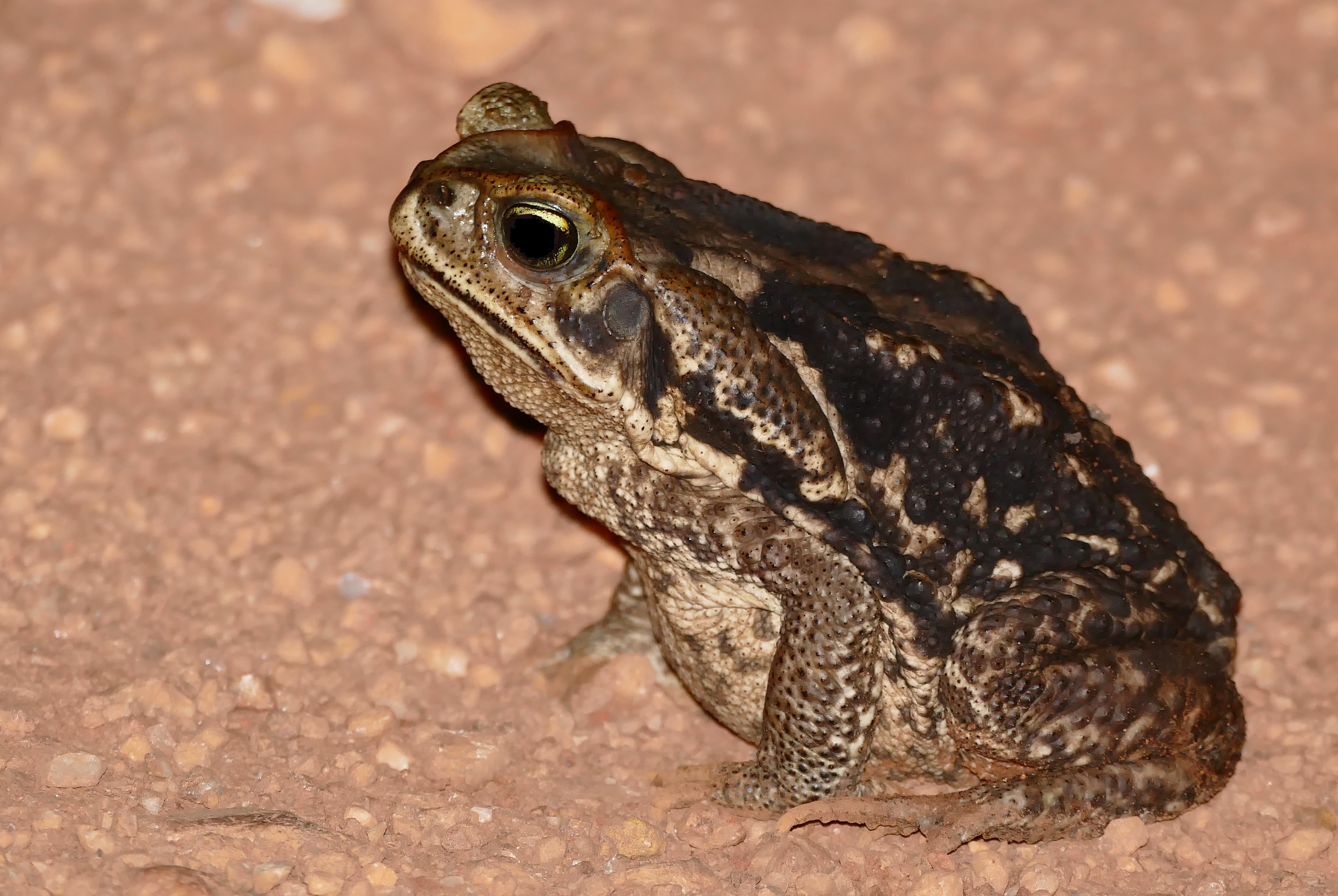
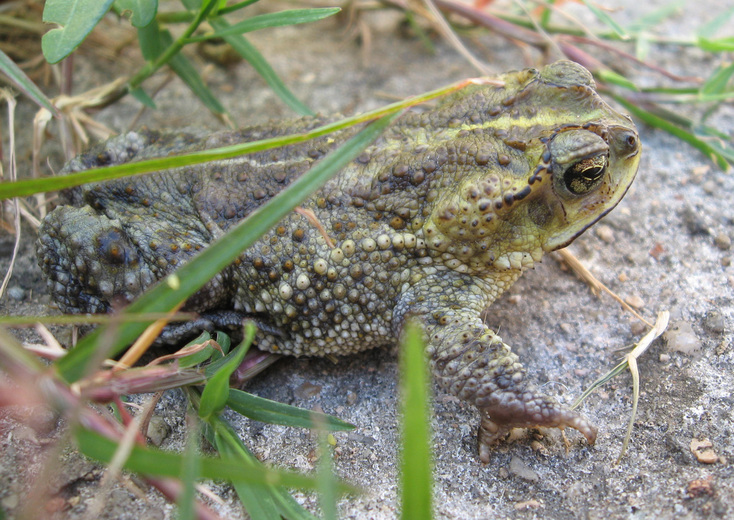
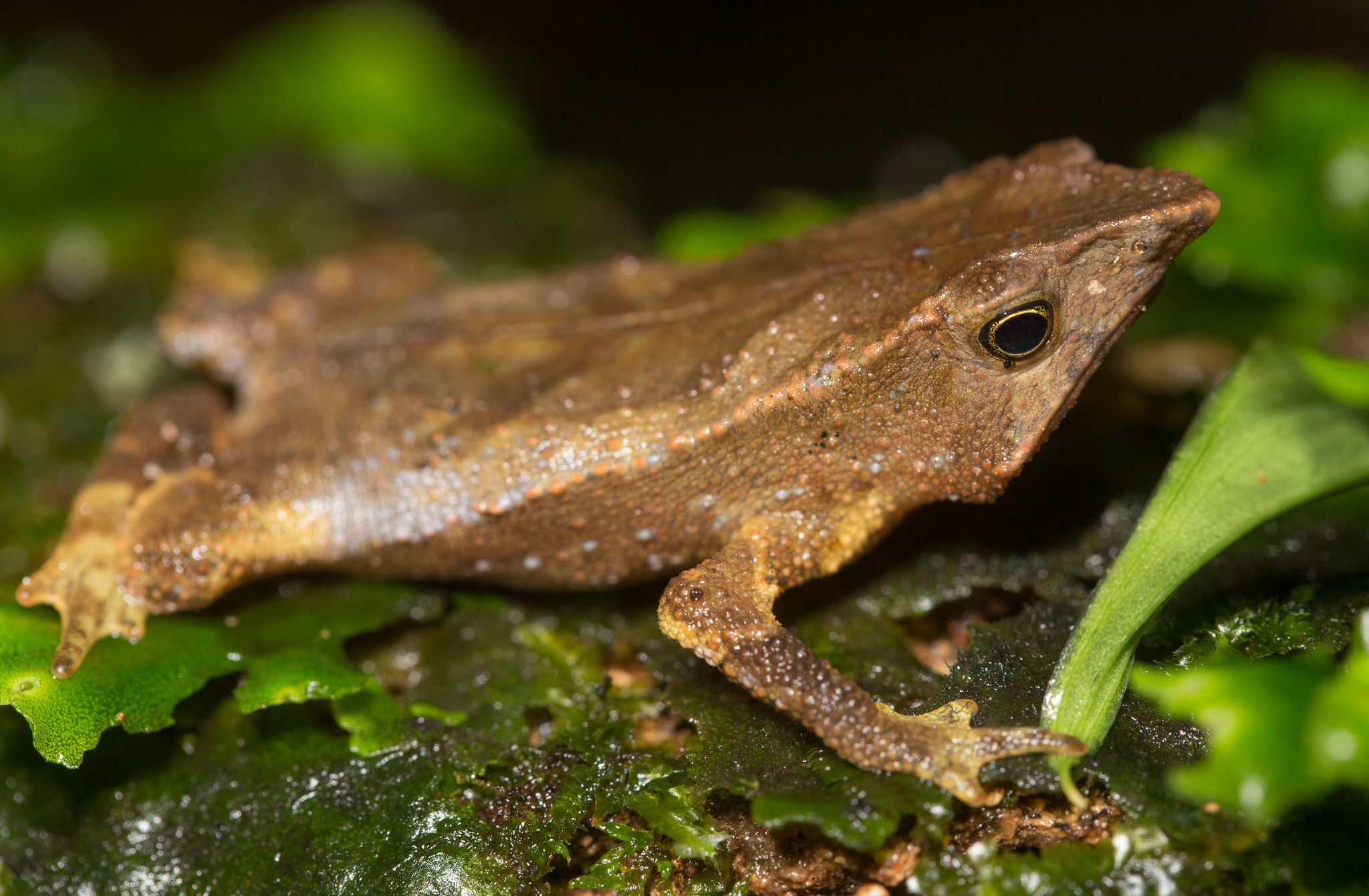
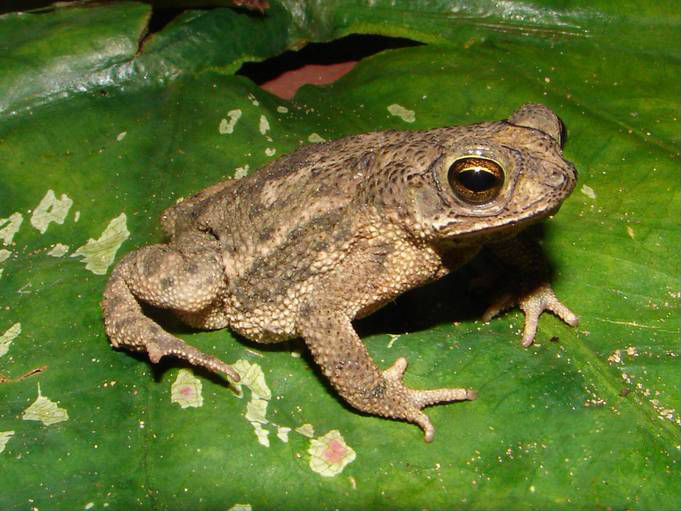
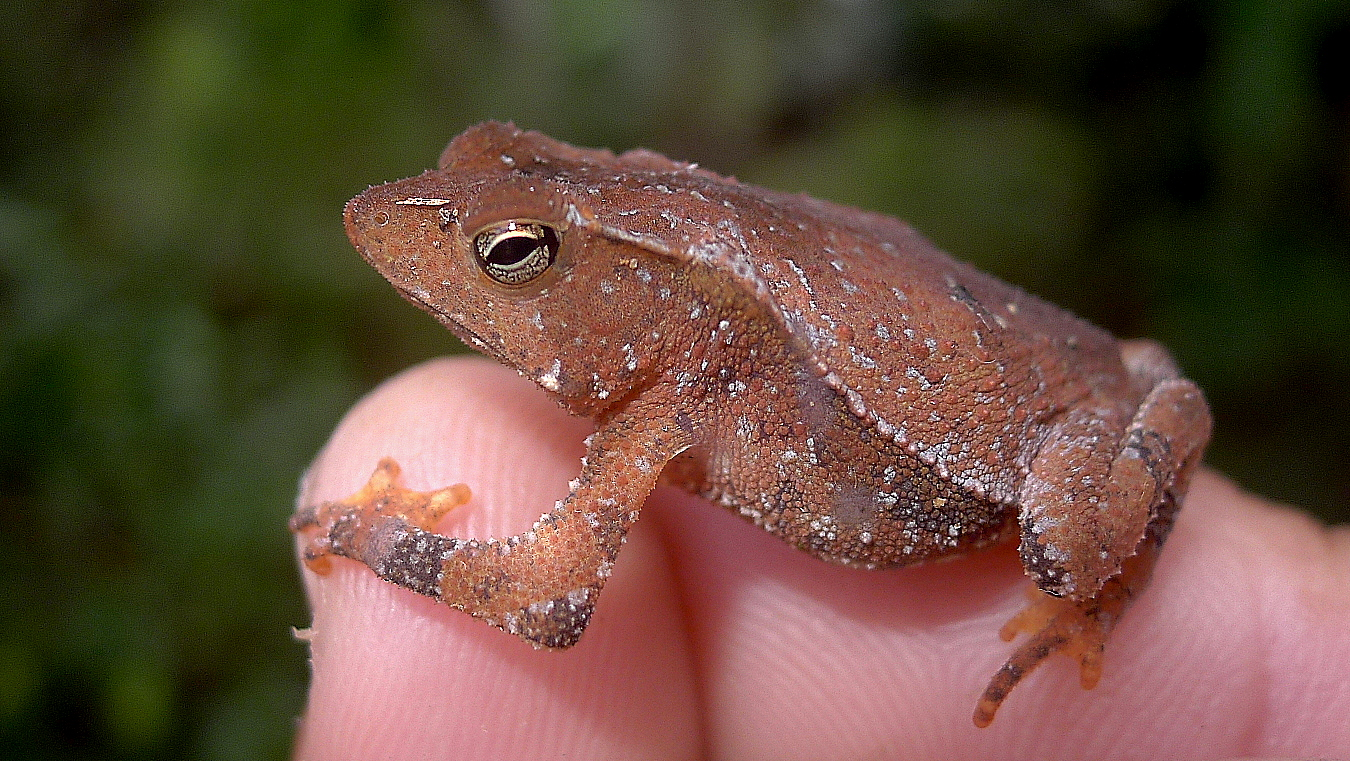
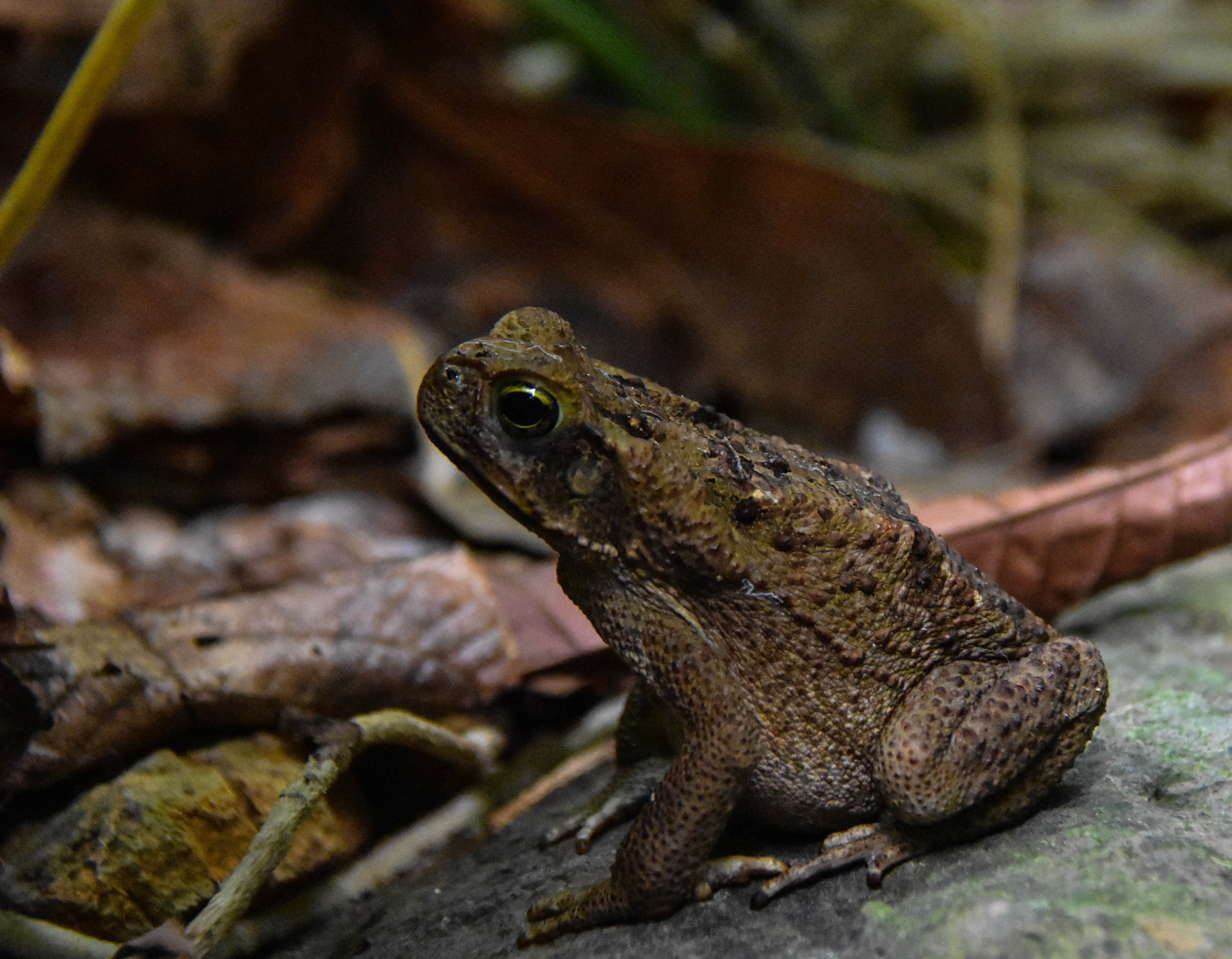
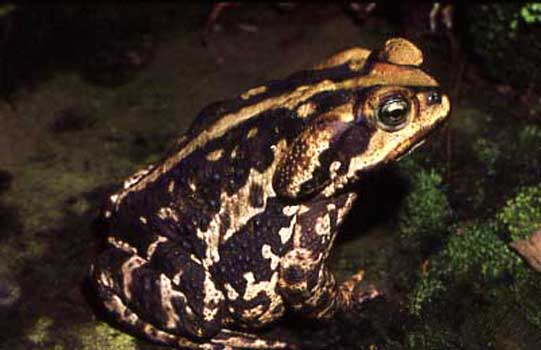
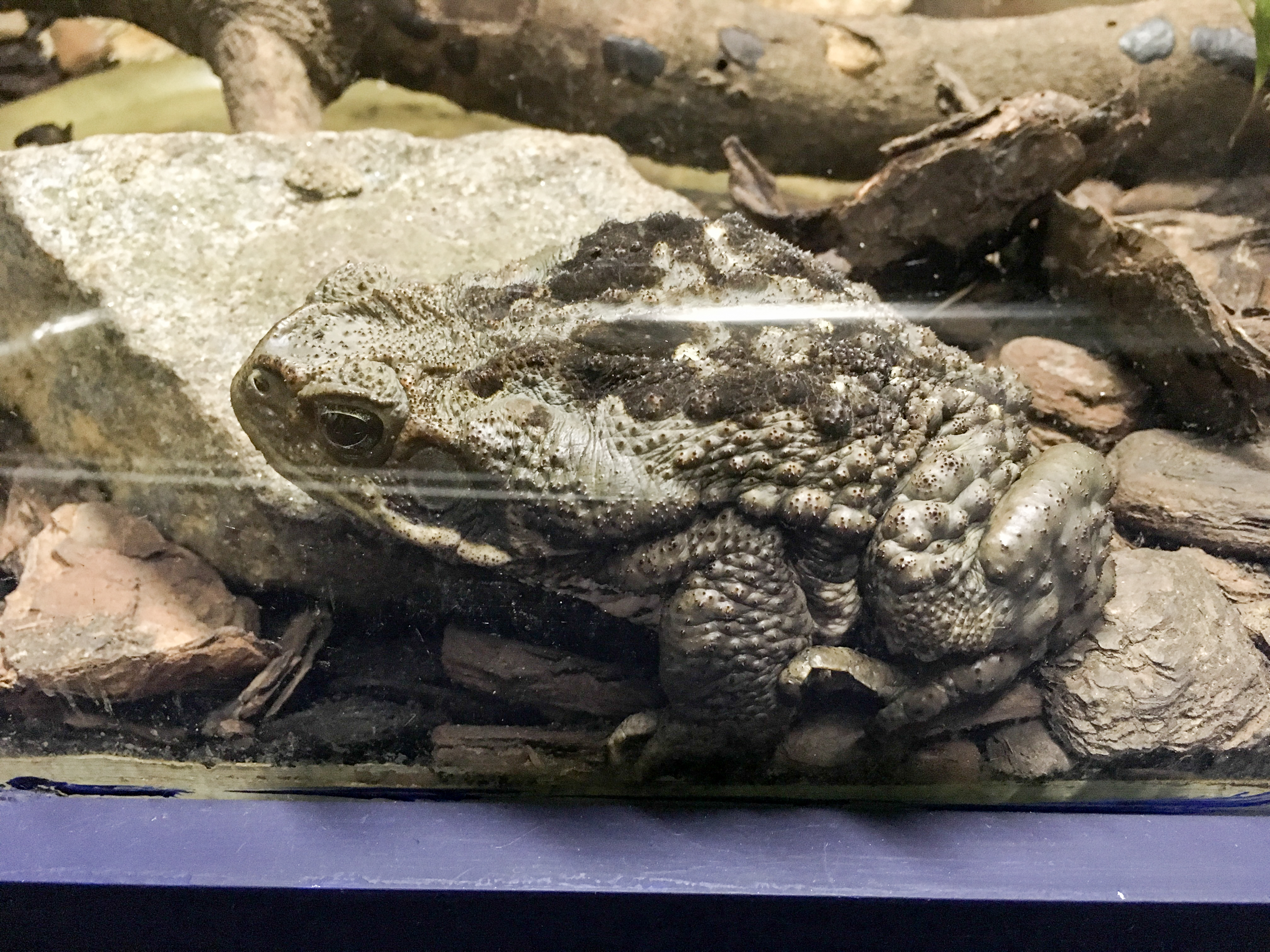
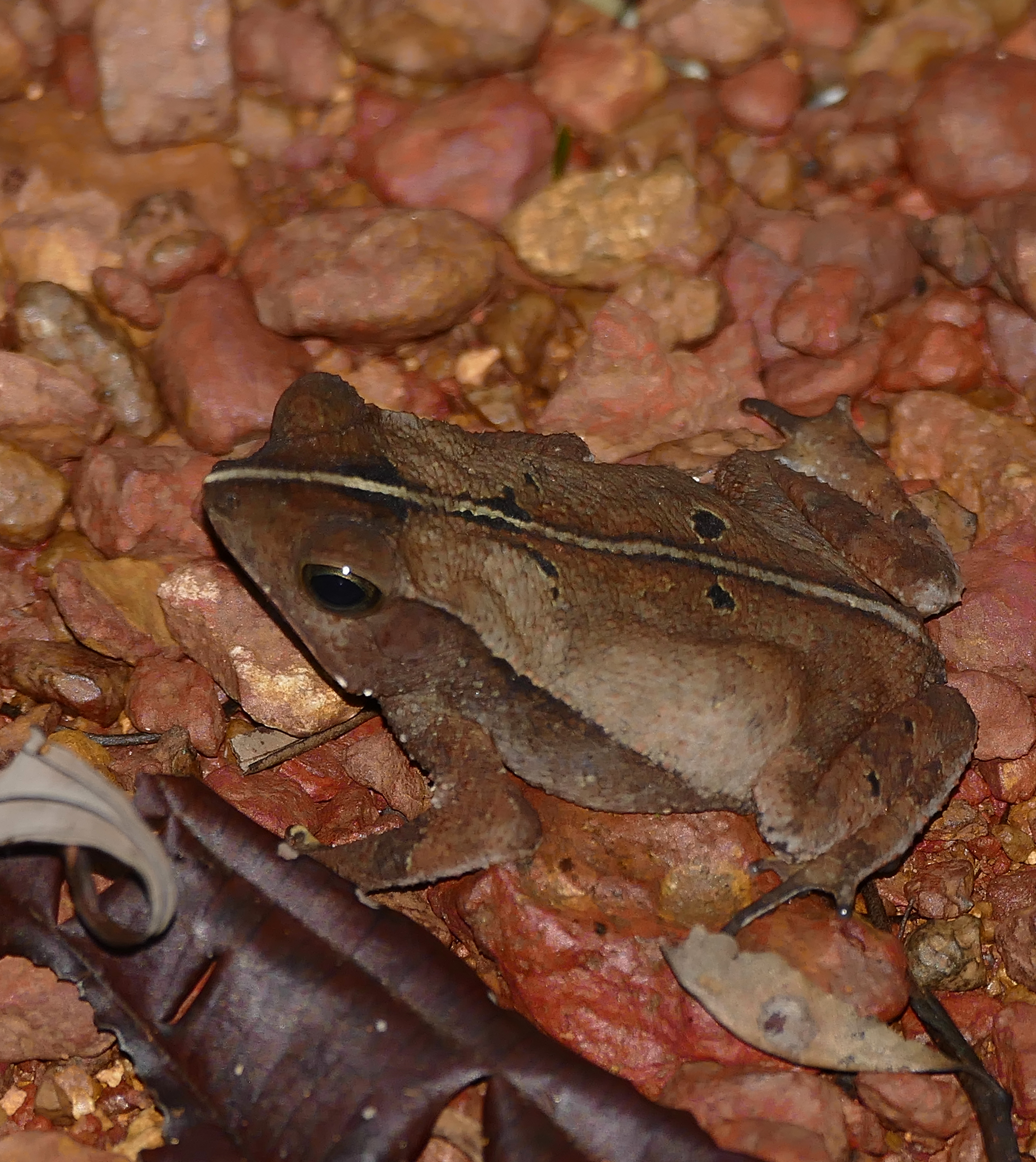
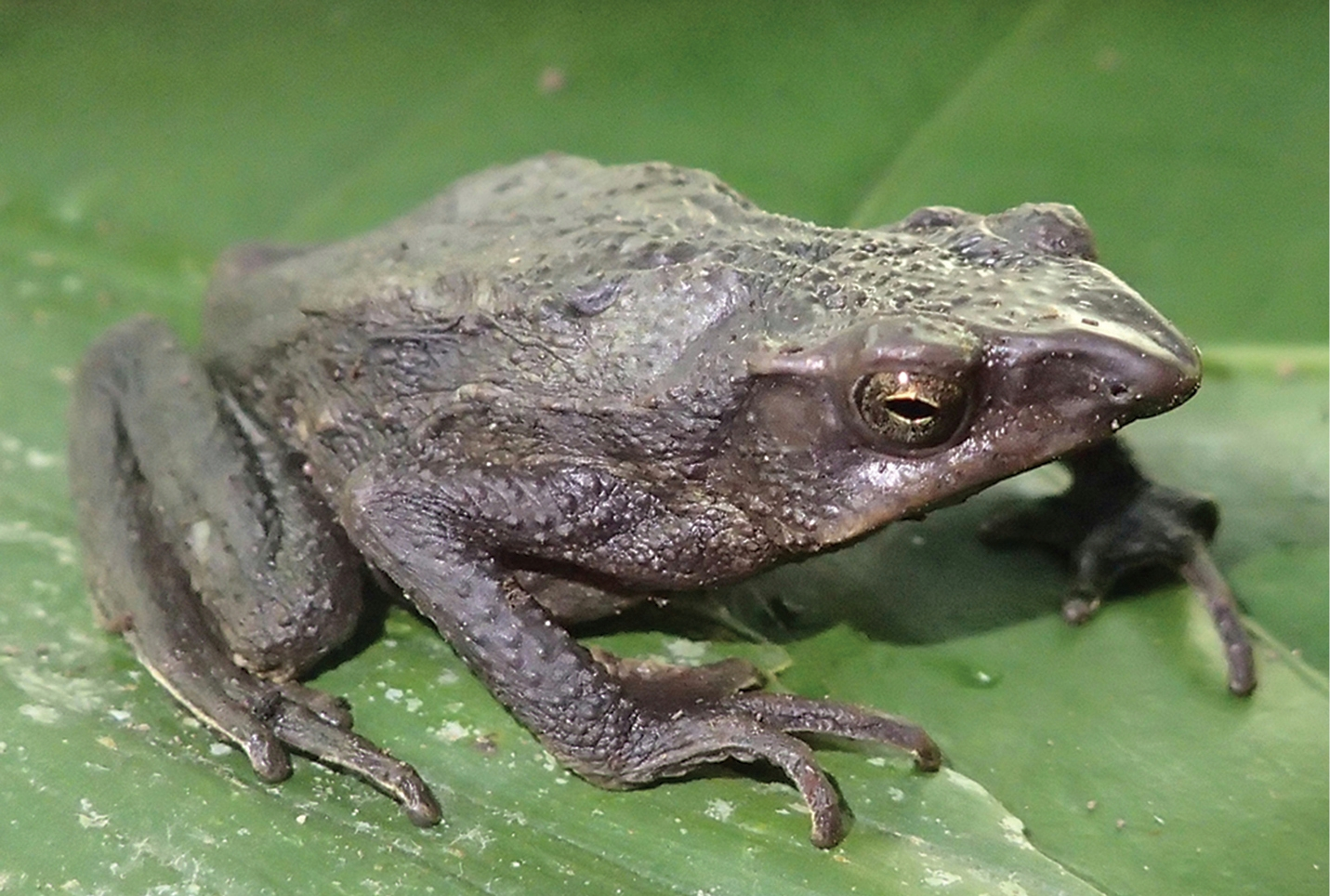
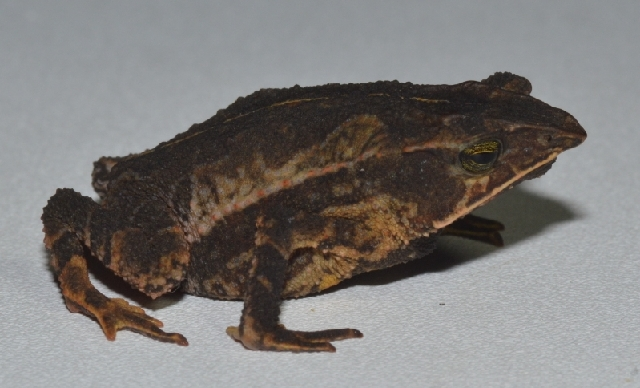
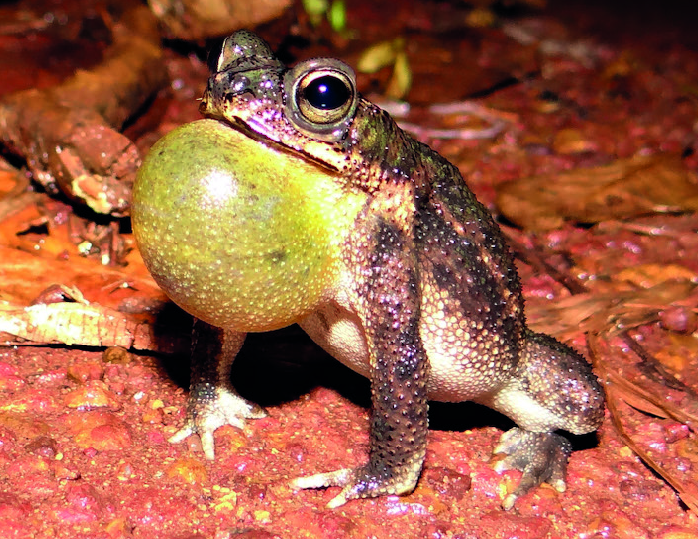
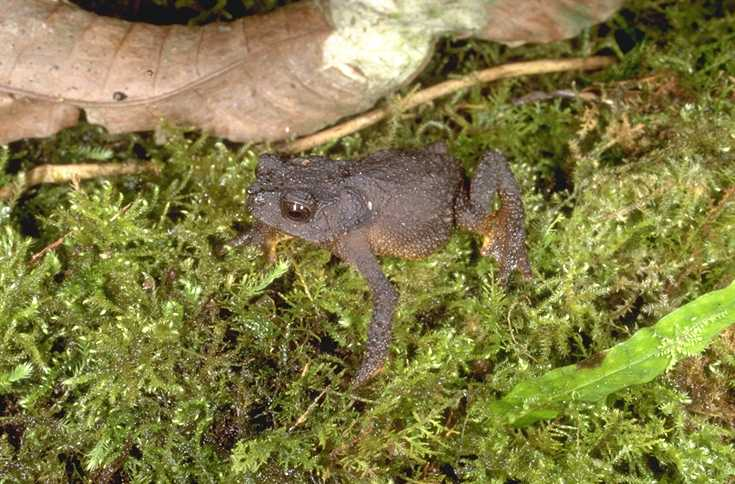
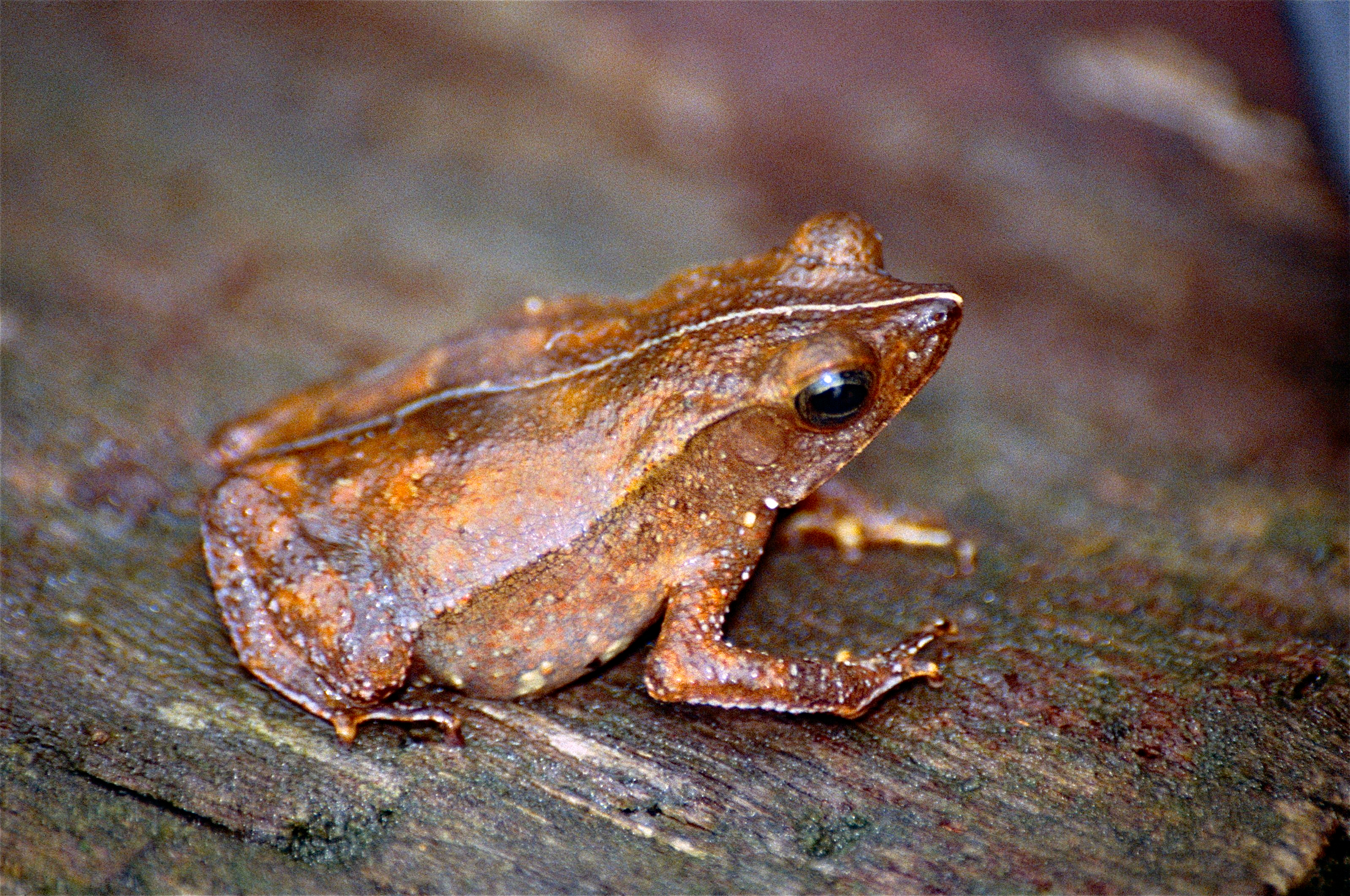
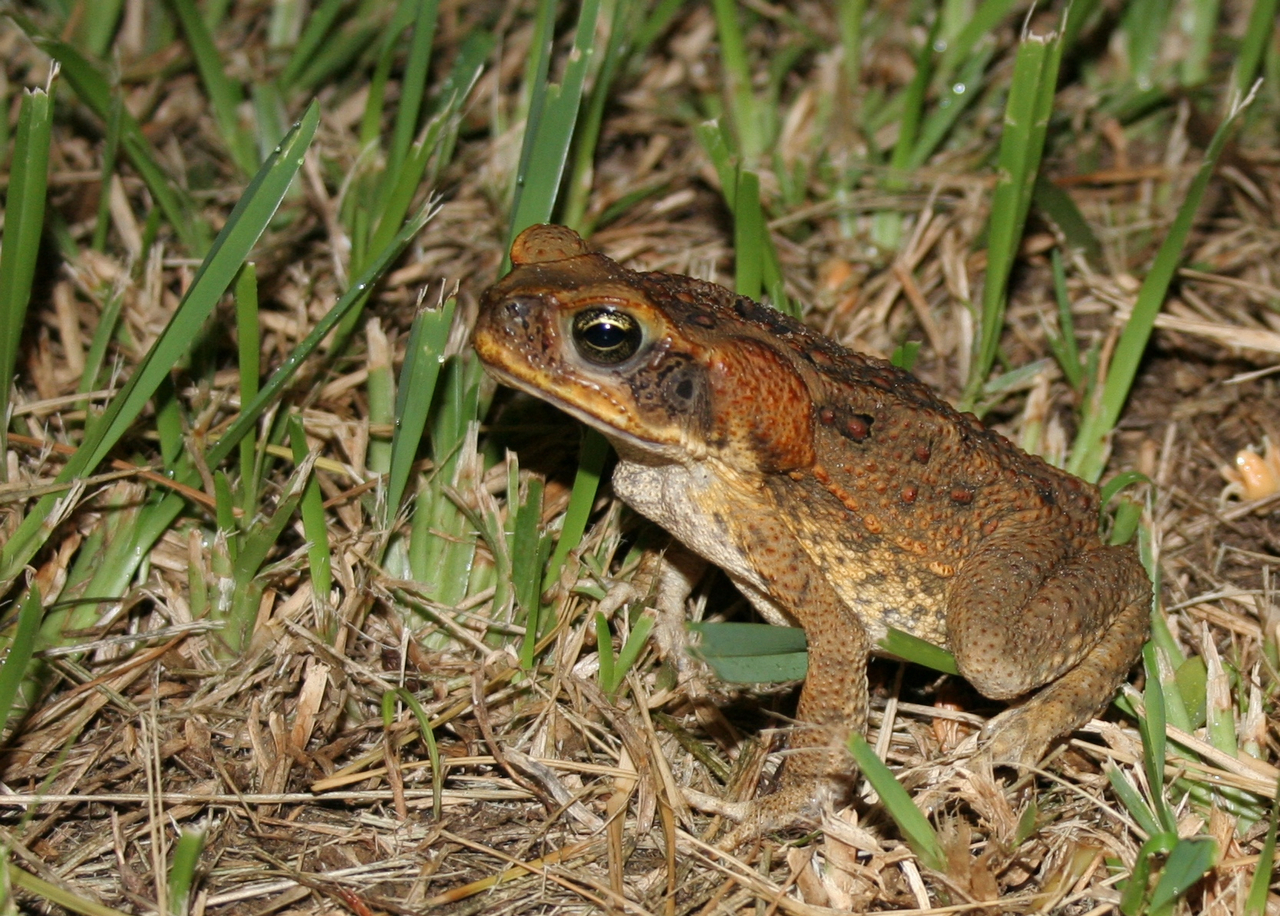
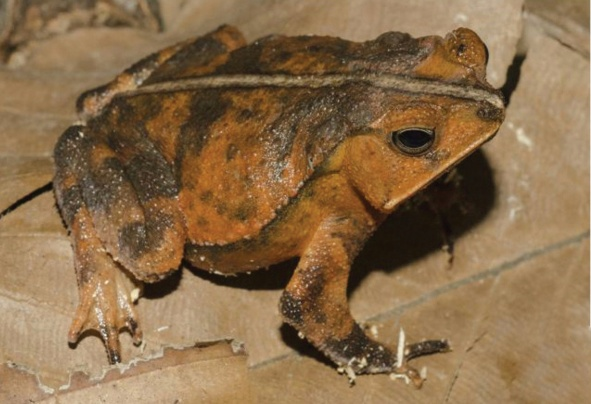
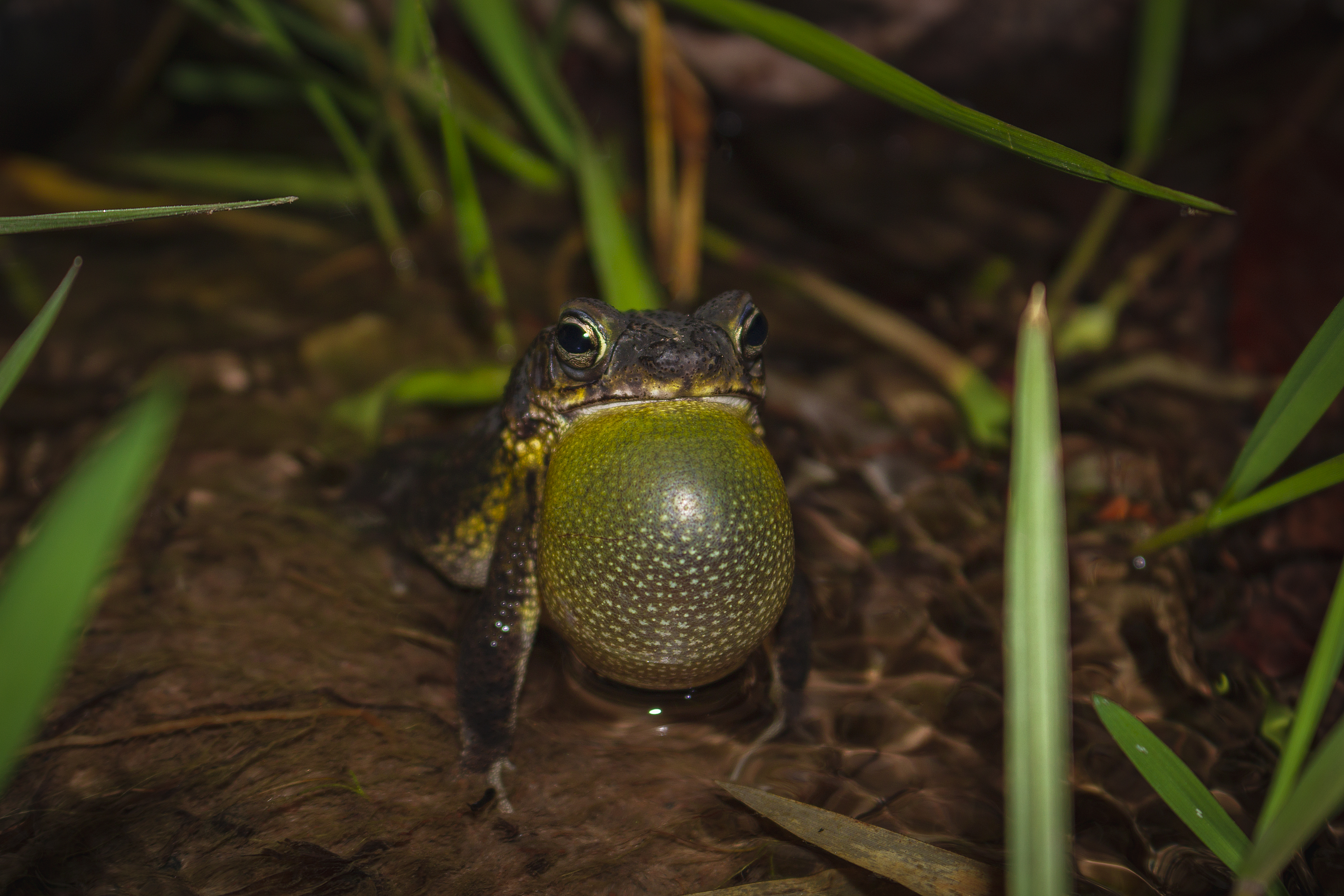
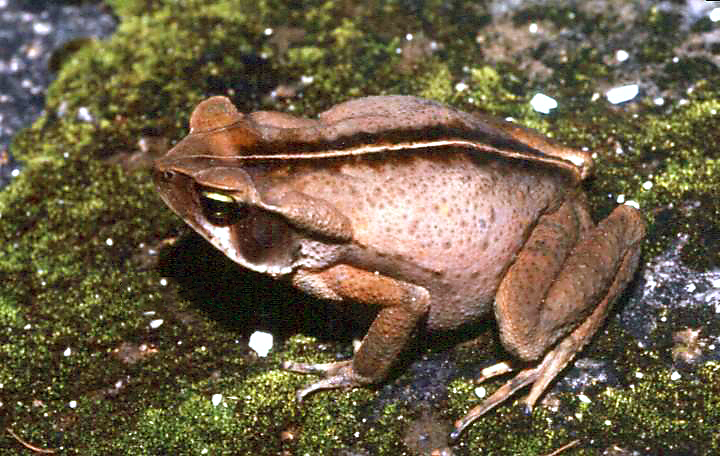
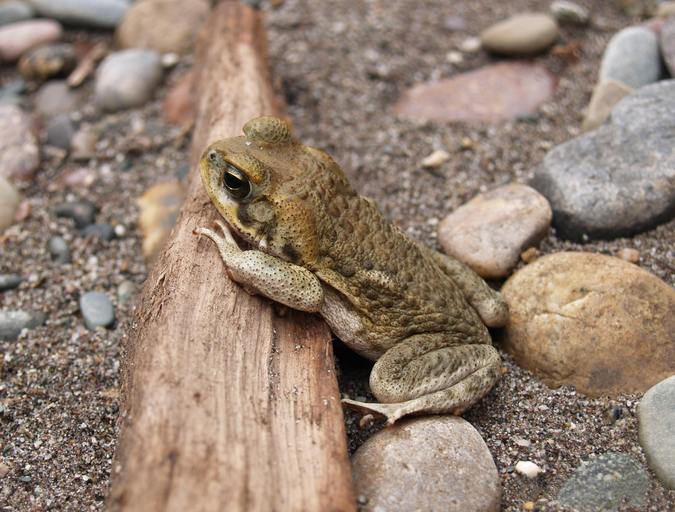
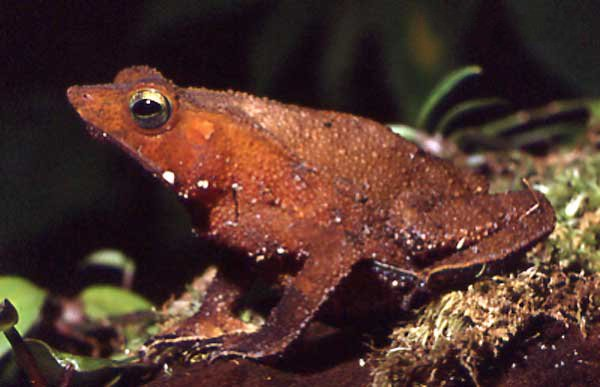
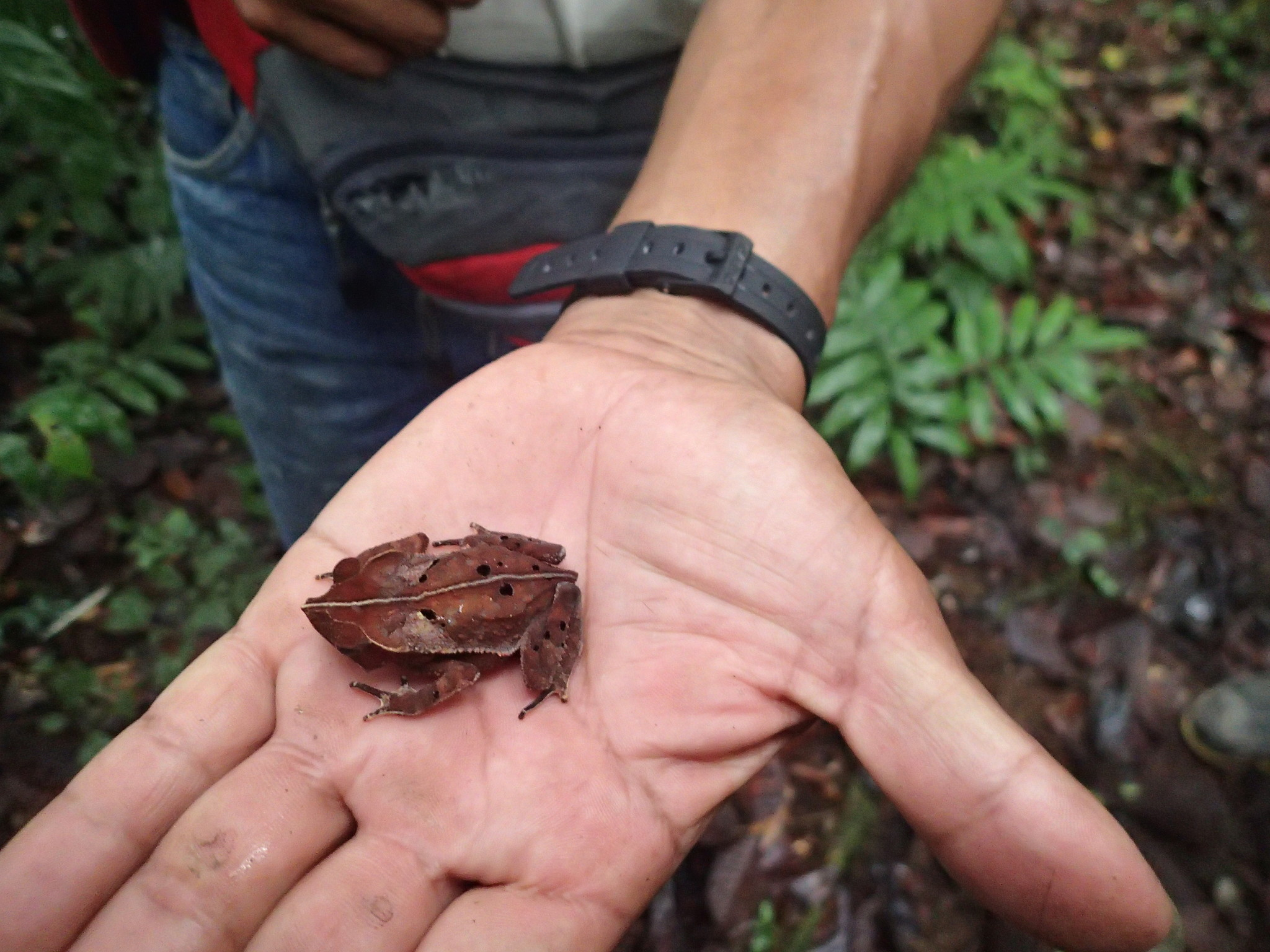
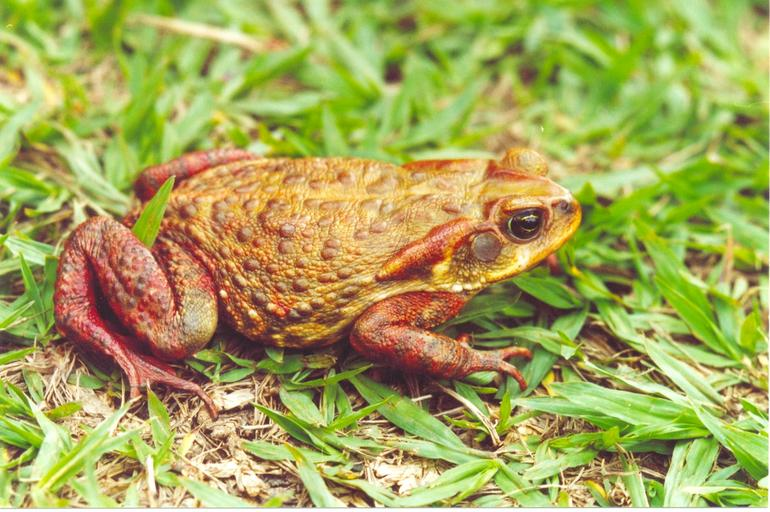
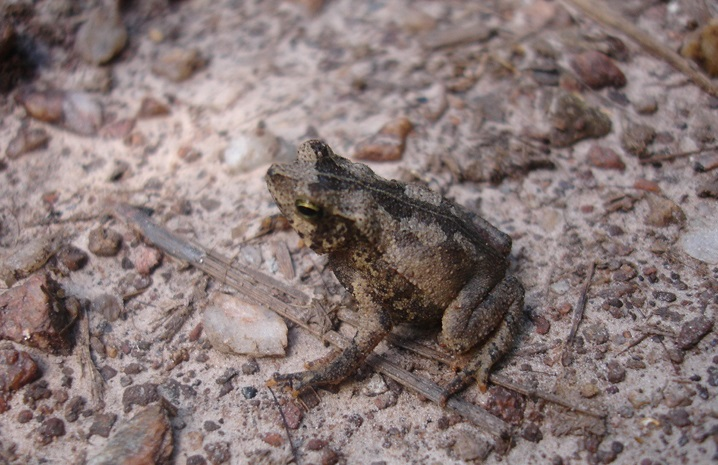
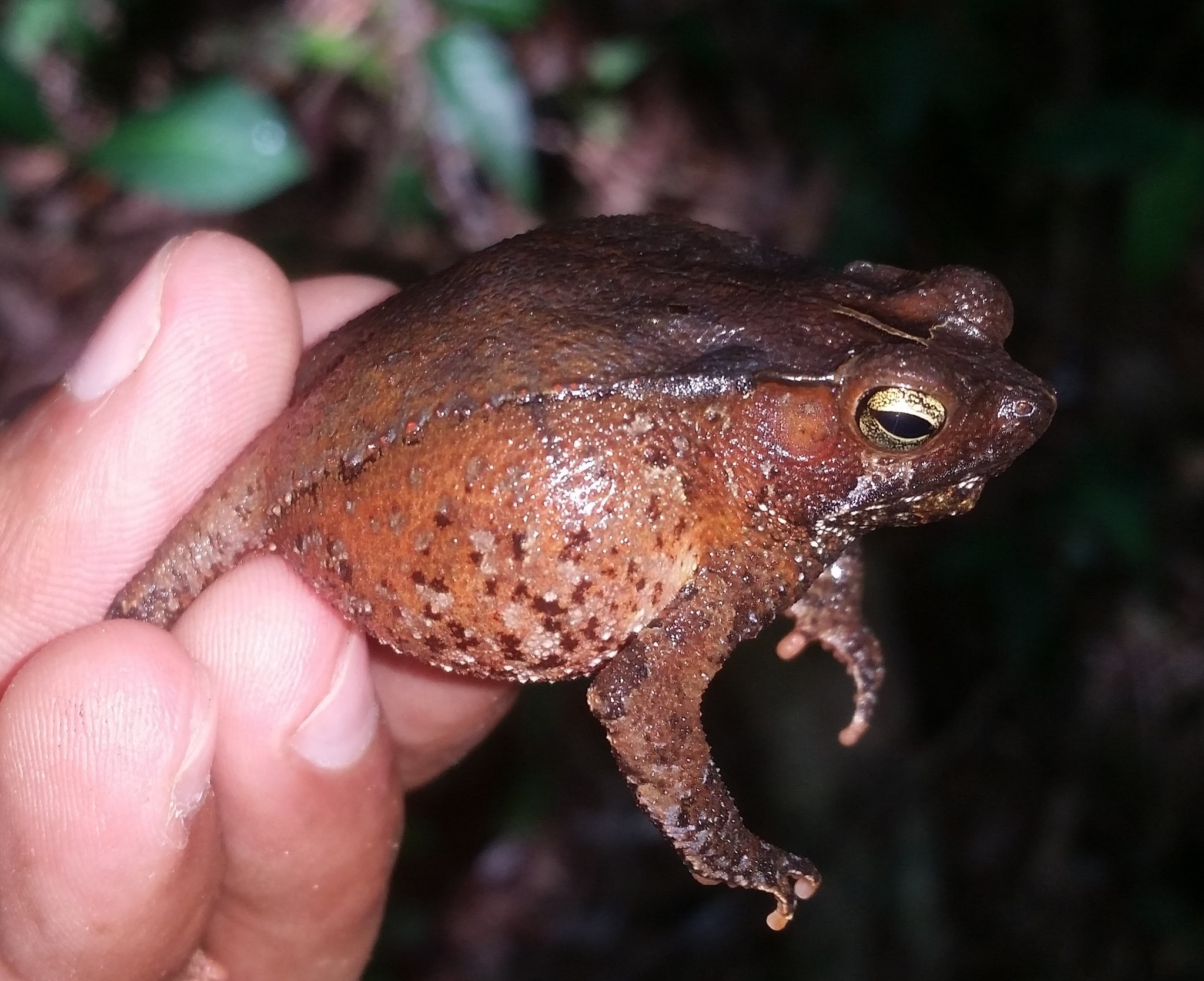
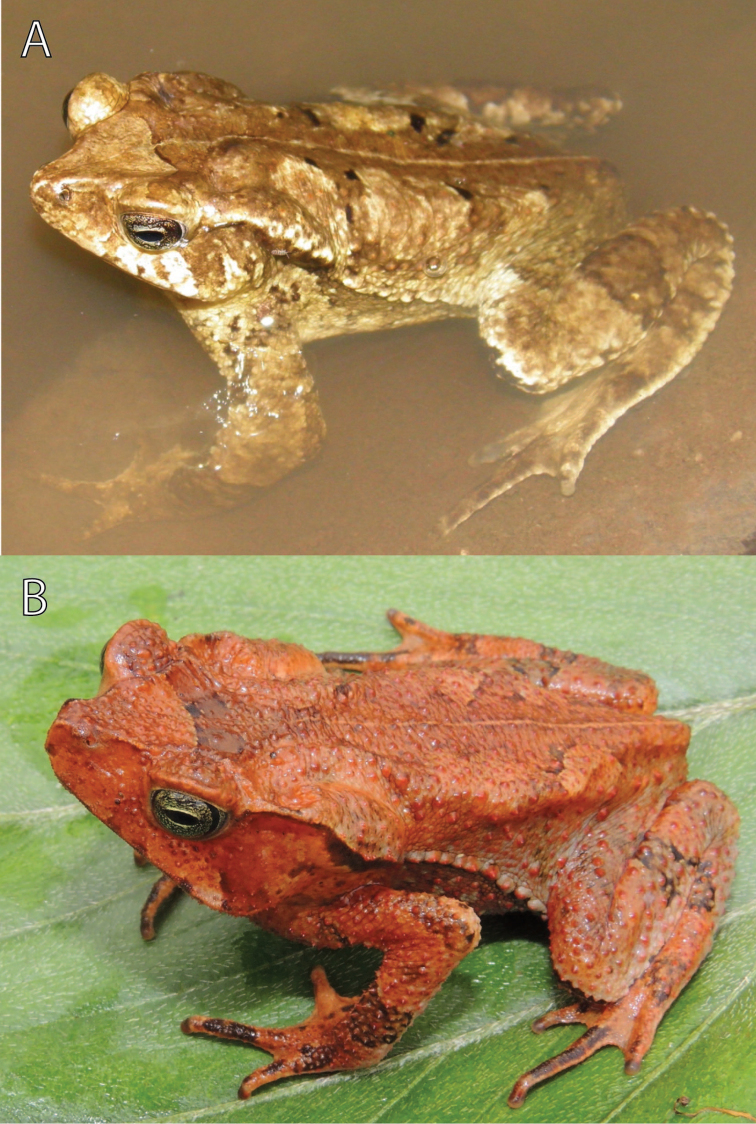
Image	Binomial name and author	Common name	Distribution
	Rhinella abei (Baldissera, Caramaschi & Haddad, 2004)		southeastern Brazil (eastern Paraná, eastern Santa Catarina and northern Rio Grande do Sul)
	Rhinella achalensis (Cei, 1972)	Cordoba toad	northern Argentina (Córdoba and San Luis provinces)
	Rhinella achavali (Maneyro, Arrieta, & de Sá, 2004)		Uruguay and southernmost Brazil (Rio Grande do Sul)
	Rhinella acrolopha (Trueb, 1971)	Cerro Mali beaked toad	Serranía del Darién in eastern Panama
	Rhinella acutirostris (Spix, 1824)		Brazil, Colombia, Panama and Venezuela
	Rhinella alata (Thominot, 1884)		Western Panama through Chocoan western Colombia to northwestern Ecuador
	Rhinella amabilis (Pramuk and Kadivar, 2003)		Loja Province, Ecuador
	Rhinella angeli (Rojas, Peña, Ávila, Carvalho, Perez, Farias, Gordo & Hrbek, 2022)		Peru
	Rhinella amboroensis (Harvey & Smith, 1993)	Cochabamba toad	Bolivia (Cochabamba Department)
	Rhinella arborescandens (Duellman & Schulte, 1992)	Mendoza Pass toad	Peru (Mendoza, northern Cordillera Central, in the Amazonas Region)
	Rhinella arenarum (Hensel, 1867)	Common toad; Argentine toad	Argentina from the Chubut Province northward, Bolivia east of the Andes
	Rhinella arequipensis (Vellard, 1959)	Rio Chili toad	Peru
	Rhinella arunco (Molina, 1782)	Arunco; Concepcion toad	Chile
	Rhinella atacamensis (Cei, 1962)	Vallenar toad; Atacama toad	Chile between Paposo (Antofagasta Region) and Las Chilcas (Valparaíso Region)
	Rhinella azarai (Gallardo, 1965)		Paraguay
	Rhinella beebei (Gallardo, 1965)	Rivero's Toad	Colombia east of the Andes and Venezuela north of the Orinoco to French Guiana; Trinidad
	Rhinella bergi (Céspedez, 2000)		Argentina, Brazil and Paraguay
	Rhinella bernardoi Sanabria, Quiroga, Arias, and Cortez, 2010		Argentina
	Rhinella casconi Roberto, Brito, and Thomé, 2014		Brazil (Ceará)
	Rhinella castaneotica (Caldwell, 1991)	Para toad	Bolivia (Pando), Brazil (Amazonas, Pará, and Rondônia), Colombia (Amazonas, Caquetá, and Putumayo) and eastern Peru
	Rhinella centralis Narvaes and Rodrigues, 2009		Panama (Chiriquí)
	Rhinella ceratophrys (Boulenger, 1882)	Horned toad	Colombia, southern Venezuela (Cerro Neblina and Cerro Marahuaca), eastern Ecuador, northeastern Peru (Loreto), Brazil
	Rhinella cerradensis Maciel, Brandão, Campos, and Sebben, 2007		Brazil (Piauí, Bahia, Goiás, Mato Grosso and Distrito Federal), Argentina (Corrientes)
	Rhinella chavin (Lehr, Köhler, Aguilar & Ponce, 2001)		Peru (Huánuco)
	Rhinella chrysophora (McCranie, Wilson & Williams, 1989)	Rio Viejo toad	Honduras
	Rhinella chullachaki (Castillo-Urbina, Glaw, Aguilar-Puntriano, Vences, and Köhler 2021)		Peru (Huánuco)
	Rhinella cristinae (Vélez-Rodriguez & Ruiz-Carranza, 2002)		Colombia(La Pedrera, Amazonas Province)
	Rhinella crucifer (Wied-Neuwied, 1821)	Striped toad	eastern Brazil between the states of Ceará in the north and Rio de Janeiro
	Rhinella dapsilis (Myers & Carvalho, 1945)	Bom Jardim toad	Brazil, Colombia, Ecuador and Peru
	Rhinella diptycha (Cope, 1862)	Cope's toad; cururu toad	Argentina, Paraguay, Uruguay, eastern Bolivia, and eastern and southern Brazil
	Rhinella dorbignyi (Duméril & Bibron, 1841)	Dorbigny's toad	northeastern Argentina, Uruguay and southeastern Brazil
	Rhinella exostosica Ferrão, Lima, Ron, dos Santos & Hanken, 2020		Bolivia (Beni and Pando Departments), Brazil (Rondônia) and Peru (Departments of Ucayali and Madre de Dios)
	Rhinella fernandezae (Gallardo, 1957)	Bella Vista toad	Argentina, Brazil, Paraguay and Uruguay
	Rhinella festae (Peracca, 1904)	Valle Santiago beaked toad	Ecuador and Peru
	Rhinella fissipes (Boulenger, 1903)	Carabaya toad	Bolivia and Peru
	Rhinella gallardoi (Carrizo, 1992)	Gallardo's toad	Argentina
	Rhinella gildae Vaz-Silva, Maciel, Bastos, and Pombal, 2015		Brazil
	Rhinella gnustae (Gallardo, 1967)	Rio Grande toad	Argentina
	Rhinella granulosa (Spix, 1824)	Common lesser toad	Brazil
	Rhinella henseli (Lutz, 1934)		Brazil
	Rhinella hoogmoedi (Caramaschi & Pombal, 2006)		Brazil
	Rhinella horribilis (Wiegmann, 1833)	Cane toad	north-western South America
	Rhinella humboldti (Gallardo, 1965)	Rivero's toad	Colombia, Venezuela, Trinidad and the Guianas
	Rhinella icterica (Spix, 1824)	Yellow Cururu toad	northeastern Argentina (Misiones Province), southern Brazil and eastern Paraguay
	Rhinella inca (Stejneger, 1913)	Inca toad	Peru
	Rhinella inopina Vaz-Silva, Valdujo, and Pombal, 2012		Minas Gerais, southeastern Brazil
	Rhinella iserni (Jiménez de la Espada, 1875)	Rio Perene toad	Peru
	Rhinella jimi (Stevaux, 2002)	Cururu toad	Brazil (between Bujaru in northeastern Pará and Maranhão in the north, south to Bahia and Vitória, Espírito Santo)
	Rhinella justinianoi (Harvey & Smith, 1994)	El Chape toad	Bolivia
	Rhinella kuka (Köhler, Vences, Padial, Plewnia & Lötters 2023)		Bolivia
	Rhinella leptoscelis (Boulenger, 1912)		Peru
	Rhinella lescurei Fouquet, Gaucher, Blanc and Velez-Rodriguez, 2007		French Guiana, Suriname
	Rhinella lilyrodriguezae Cusi, Moravec, Lehr, and Gvoždík, 2017	Lily Rodriguez's beaked toad	Peru
	Rhinella limensis (Werner, 1901)	Peru Coast toad	Peru
	Rhinella lindae (Rivero & Castaño, 1990)	Murri beaked toad	Colombia
	†Rhinella loba Pérez-Ben, Gómez & Báez, 2019		Argentina
	Rhinella macrorhina (Trueb, 1971)	Santa Rita beaked toad	Colombia
	Rhinella magnussoni Lima, Menin, and Araújo, 2007		Brazil
	Rhinella major (Müller and Hellmich, 1936)		Argentina, Paraguay and Bolivia and in Brazil
	Rhinella manu Chaparro, Pramuk, and Gluesenkamp, 2007		Peru
	Rhinella margaritifera (Laurenti, 1768)	South American common toad	Panama, Bolivia, Brazil, Colombia, Ecuador, French Guiana, Guyana, Peru, Suriname and Venezuela
	Rhinella marina (Linnaeus, 1758)	Cane toad	South and mainland Central America
	Rhinella martyi Fouquet, Gaucher, Blanc and Velez-Rodriguez, 2007		Suriname
	Rhinella merianae (Gallardo, 1965)		Venezuela (Bolívar), Suriname, Guyana, Brazil
	Rhinella mirandaribeiroi (Gallardo, 1965)		Brazil(Bahia, Maranhão, Mato Grosso, Mato Grosso do Sul, Minas Gerais, Pará, and Piaui), Bolivia (Santa Cruz)
	Rhinella multiverrucosa (Lehr, Pramuk & Lundberg, 2005)		Peru (Pasco)
	Rhinella nattereri (Bokermann, 1967)		Venezuela (Bolivar), Guyana
	Rhinella nesiotes (Duellman & Toft, 1979)	Laguna toad	Peru
	Rhinella nicefori (Cochran & Goin, 1970)	Colombian beaked toad	Colombia (Antioquia)
	Rhinella ocellata (Günther, 1858)	Ocellated toad	Brazil
	Rhinella ornata Spix, 1824		Brazil
	Rhinella paraguas Grant and Bolívar-Garcías, 2014		Colombia (Chocó)
	Rhinella paraguayensis Ávila, Pansonato, and Strüssmann, 2010		Paraguay
	Rhinella parecis Ávila, Morais, Perez, Pansonato, Carvalho, Rojas, Gordo & Farias, 2020		Brazil
	Rhinella pleuroptera Schmidt, 1857		Peru
	Rhinella poeppigii (Tschudi, 1845)	Gray toad	Ecuador, Peru and Bolivia
	Rhinella proboscidea (Spix, 1824)	Beaked toad	Brazil, Colombia, Ecuador and Peru
	Rhinella pygmaea (Myers & Carvalho, 1952)	Rio Parahyba toad	Brazil
	Rhinella quechua (Gallardo, 1961)	Incachaca toad	Bolivia
	Rhinella roqueana (Melin, 1941)		northern Peru, eastern Ecuador (Pastaza), Amazonian Colombia (Amazonas and Caquetá Departments), Brazil
	Rhinella rostrata (Noble, 1920)	Mesopotamia beaked toad	Colombia (Antioquia)
	Rhinella rubescens (Lutz, 1925)		Brazil
	Rhinella rubropunctata (Guichenot, 1848)	Rusty toad	Chile and Argentina
	Rhinella ruizi (Grant, 2000)		Colombia (Antioquia)
	Rhinella rumbolli (Carrizo, 1992)	Salta toad	Bolivia
	Rhinella scitula (Caramaschi & de Niemeyer, 2003)		Paraguay (Amambay and Concepción Departments), Brazil (Mato Grosso do Sul)
	Rhinella sclerocephala (Mijares-Urrutia & Arends-R., 2001)		Venezuela
	Rhinella sebbeni Vaz-Silva, Maciel, Bastos, and Pombal, 2015		Brazil
	Rhinella spinulosa (Wiegmann, 1834)	Warty toad; Huanuco toad	Argentina, Bolivia, Chile and Peru
	Rhinella stanlaii (Lötters & Köhler, 2000)		Bolivia (Cochabamba, La Paz and Santa Cruz)
	Rhinella sternosignata (Günther, 1858)	Falcon toad	Colombia and Venezuela
	Rhinella tacana (Padial, Reichle, McDiarmid, & De la Riva, 2006)		Bolivia (La Paz)
	Rhinella tenrec (Lynch & Renjifo, 1990)	Antioquia Beaked Toad	Colombia
	Rhinella teotoniensis (Ferrão, Souza, Colatreli, Hanken & Lima, 2022)	Teotonio Falls Leaf-litter Toad	Bolivia, Brazil
	Rhinella truebae (Lynch & Renjifo, 1990)	Trueb's Beaked Toad	Colombia
	Rhinella unapensis Rojas, Peña, Ávila, Carvalho, Perez, Farias, Gordo & Hrbek, 2022)		Peru
	Rhinella vellardi (Leviton & Duellman, 1978)	Alto Maranon toad	Peru
	Rhinella veraguensis (Schmidt, 1857)	Veragua toad	Bolivia and southeastern Peru
	Rhinella veredas (Brandão, Maciel, and Sebben, 2007)		Brazil(Piauí and Bahia)
	Rhinella yanachaga Lehr, Pramuk, Hedges, and Córdova, 2007		Peru (Pasco)
	Rhinella yunga (Mordavec, Lehr, 2014)		Peru (Yungas)
