= Rhinella multiverrucosa =

Conservation status
- Data Deficient (IUCN 3.1)

Scientific classification
- Kingdom: Animalia
- Phylum: Chordata
- Class: Amphibia
- Order: Anura
- Family: Bufonidae
- Genus: Rhinella
- Species: R. multiverrucosa

Binomial name
- Rhinella multiverrucosa (Lehr, Pramuk & Lundberg, 2005)

Synonyms
- Bufo multiverrucosus Lehr, Pramuk & Lundberg, 2005

Species of amphibian

Rhinella multiverrucosa is a species of toad in the family Bufonidae (Lehr 2006). It is endemic to Peru. Its natural habitat is subtropical or tropical moist montane forests. It is threatened by habitat loss.
