= Rhinella justinianoi =

Conservation status
- Vulnerable (IUCN 3.1)

Scientific classification
- Kingdom: Animalia
- Phylum: Chordata
- Class: Amphibia
- Order: Anura
- Family: Bufonidae
- Genus: Rhinella
- Species: R. justinianoi

Binomial name
- Rhinella justinianoi (Harvey & Smith, 1994)

Synonyms
- Bufo justinianoi; Chaunus justinianoi

Species of amphibian

Rhinella justinianoi is a species of toad in the family Bufonidae that is endemic to Bolivia. Its natural habitats are subtropical or tropical moist montane forests and rivers. It is threatened by habitat loss.
