= Rhinella acutirostris =

Conservation status
- Least Concern (IUCN 3.1)

Scientific classification
- Kingdom: Animalia
- Phylum: Chordata
- Class: Amphibia
- Order: Anura
- Family: Bufonidae
- Genus: Rhinella
- Species: R. acutirostris

Binomial name
- Rhinella acutirostris (Spix, 1824)

Synonyms
- Bufo alatus Thominot, 1884; Bufo acutirostris

Species of Amphibia

Rhinella acutirostris is a species of toad in the family Bufonidae. It is found in Brazil, Colombia, Panama, and Venezuela. Its natural habitats are subtropical or tropical moist lowland forests, freshwater marshes, and intermittent freshwater marshes.
