= Rhinella cristinae =

Conservation status
- Endangered (IUCN 3.1)

Scientific classification
- Kingdom: Animalia
- Phylum: Chordata
- Class: Amphibia
- Order: Anura
- Family: Bufonidae
- Genus: Rhinella
- Species: R. cristinae

Binomial name
- Rhinella cristinae (Velez-Rodriguez and Ruiz-Carranza, 2002)

Synonyms
- Bufo cristinae

Species of amphibian

Rhinella cristinae is a species of toad in the family Bufonidae. It is found in La Pedrera, Amazonas Province, Colombia and possibly Brazil. Its natural habitats are subtropical or tropical moist lowland forests and rivers. It is named for Colombian amphibian collector and colleague of the discoverers, Cristina Ardila-Robayo.
