= Rhinella stanlaii =

Conservation status
- Least Concern (IUCN 3.1)

Scientific classification
- Kingdom: Animalia
- Phylum: Chordata
- Class: Amphibia
- Order: Anura
- Family: Bufonidae
- Genus: Rhinella
- Species: R. stanlaii

Binomial name
- Rhinella stanlaii (Lötters and Köhler, 2000)

Synonyms
- Bufo stanlaii Lötters and Köhler, 2000

Species of amphibian

Rhinella stanlaii is a species of toad in the family Bufonidae. It is endemic to Bolivia and occurs on the Amazonian versant of the Bolivian Andes in the Cochabamba, La Paz, and Santa Cruz departments.

Rhinella stanlaii inhabits humid montane and cloud forests at elevations of 1,000–2,300 m (3,300–7,500 ft) above sea level. It can occur in disturbed habitats. It is not an uncommon species. It is not facing known significant threats. It occurs in a number of protected areas.
