= Rhinella rubropunctata =

Conservation status
- Vulnerable (IUCN 3.1)

Scientific classification
- Kingdom: Animalia
- Phylum: Chordata
- Class: Amphibia
- Order: Anura
- Family: Bufonidae
- Genus: Rhinella
- Species: R. rubropunctata

Binomial name
- Rhinella rubropunctata (Guichenot, 1848)

Synonyms
- Bufo rubropunctatus Guichenot, 1848; Rhinella rubropunctatus

Species of amphibian

Rhinella rubropunctata (common name: red-spotted toad) is a species of toad in the family Bufonidae that is found in southern Chile and Argentina. Its natural habitats are humid to xeric temperate forests and open environments. It tolerates a certain degree of disturbance. Breeding takes place in shallow temporary ponds near rivers, reservoirs and lakes. It is threatened by habitat degradation and fragmentation.
