= Rhinella veraguensis =

Conservation status
- Least Concern (IUCN 3.1)

Scientific classification
- Kingdom: Animalia
- Phylum: Chordata
- Class: Amphibia
- Order: Anura
- Family: Bufonidae
- Genus: Rhinella
- Species: R. veraguensis

Binomial name
- Rhinella veraguensis (Schmidt, 1857)

Synonyms
- Bufo veraguensis Schmidt, 1857; Bufo ockendeni Boulenger, 1902

Species of amphibian

Rhinella veraguensis is a species of toad in the family Bufonidae. It is found in the Amazonian versant of the Andes and in the inter-Andean valleys in Bolivia and southeastern Peru. Its natural habitats are montane tropical forests and cloud forests. Breeding takes place in streams. There are no major threats to this common species, although it can locally suffer from habitat loss.
