= Rhinella limensis =

Conservation status
- Least Concern (IUCN 3.1)

Scientific classification
- Kingdom: Animalia
- Phylum: Chordata
- Class: Amphibia
- Order: Anura
- Family: Bufonidae
- Genus: Rhinella
- Species: R. limensis

Binomial name
- Rhinella limensis (Werner, 1901)

Synonyms
- Bufo limensis

Species of amphibian

Rhinella limensis is a species of toad in the family Bufonidae. It is endemic to Peru. Its natural habitats are rivers, hot deserts, sandy shores, arable land, and rural gardens.
