= Rhinella truebae =

Conservation status
- Data Deficient (IUCN 3.1)

Scientific classification
- Kingdom: Animalia
- Phylum: Chordata
- Class: Amphibia
- Order: Anura
- Family: Bufonidae
- Genus: Rhinella
- Species: R. truebae

Binomial name
- Rhinella truebae (Lynch & Renjifo, 1990)

Synonyms
- Rhamphophryne truebae Lynch & Renjifo, 1990

Species of amphibian

Rhinella truebae is a species of toad in the family Bufonidae. It is endemic to Colombia.
