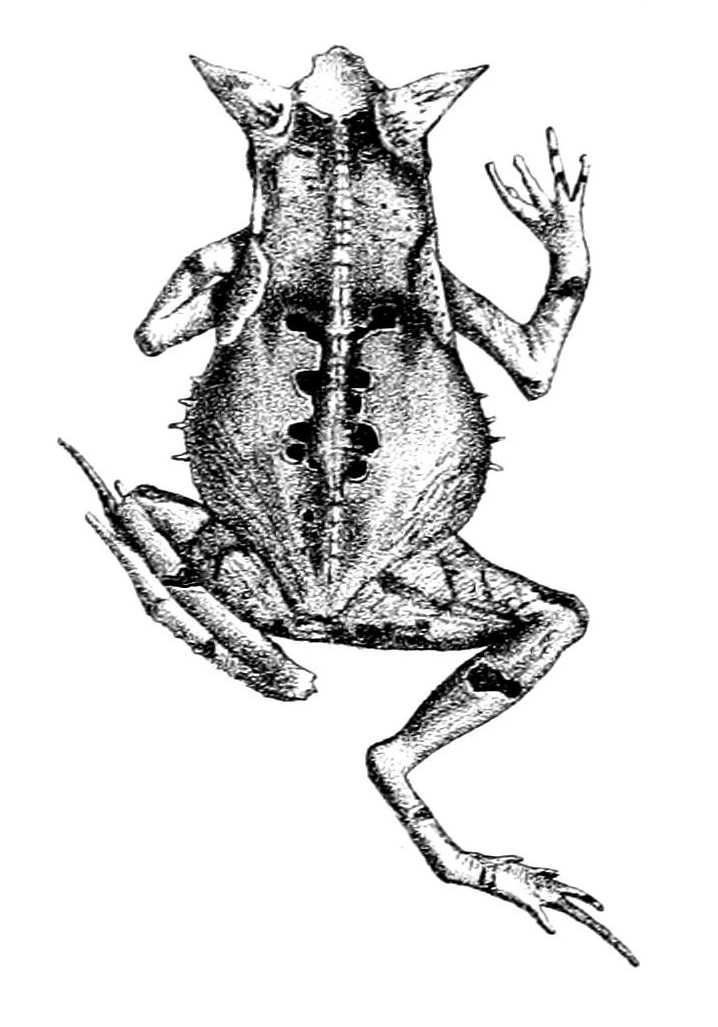

Conservation status
- Least Concern (IUCN 3.1)

Scientific classification
- Kingdom: Animalia
- Phylum: Chordata
- Class: Amphibia
- Order: Anura
- Family: Bufonidae
- Genus: Rhinella
- Species: R. ceratophrys

Binomial name
- Rhinella ceratophrys (Boulenger, 1882)

= Rhinella ceratophrys =

Species of amphibian

Rhinella ceratophrys, formerly Bufo ceratophrys, is a species of toad in the family Bufonidae. It is sometimes known as the horned toad in English and sapo cornudo in Spanish. It has a wide distribution in the upper Amazon. Its natural habitats are in old and second-growth lowland tropical rainforests. It is threatened by habitat loss from deforestation.
