= Rhinella fissipes =

Conservation status
- Data Deficient (IUCN 3.1)

Scientific classification
- Kingdom: Animalia
- Phylum: Chordata
- Class: Amphibia
- Order: Anura
- Family: Bufonidae
- Genus: Rhinella
- Species: R. fissipes

Binomial name
- Rhinella fissipes (Boulenger, 1903)

Synonyms
- Bufo fissipes; Chaunus fissipes

Species of amphibian

Rhinella fissipes, the Carabaya toad, is a species of toad in the family Bufonidae that is found in Bolivia and Peru. Its natural habitats are subtropical or tropical moist montane forests, rivers, freshwater marshes, and intermittent freshwater marshes.

== Status ==
Rhinella fissipes is considered not threatened given its large and vast distribution. Habitat loss has effected the distribution of Rhinella fissipes, but has not been evaluated as a threat.

== Conservation ==
The Carabaya toad is found in a couple of National Parks to help further protection. Some of these parks include the Pilon Lajas Biosphere Reserve and Carrasco National Park.
