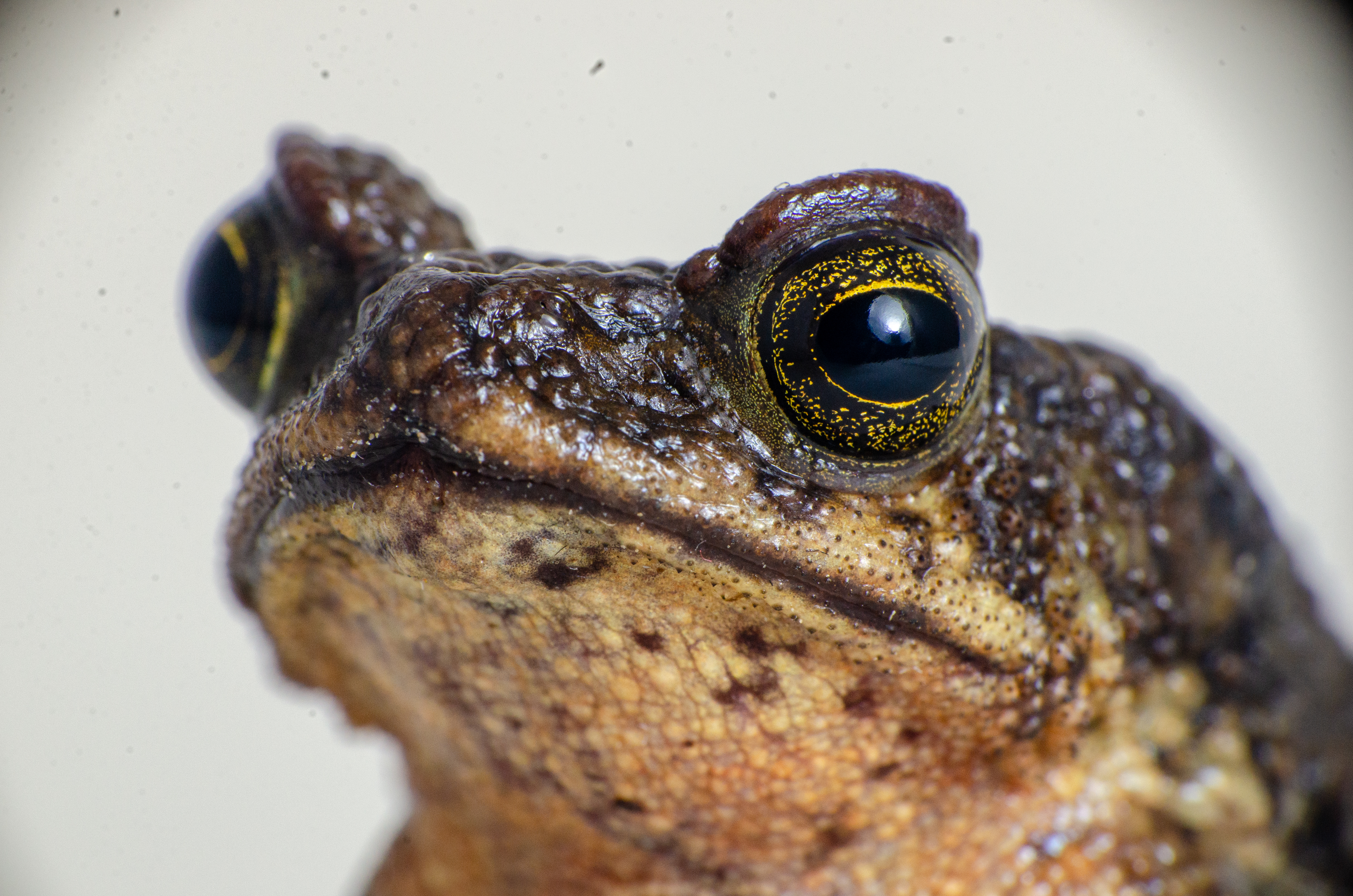

Conservation status
- Vulnerable (IUCN 3.1)

Scientific classification
- Kingdom: Animalia
- Phylum: Chordata
- Class: Amphibia
- Order: Anura
- Family: Bufonidae
- Genus: Rhinella
- Species: R. quechua

Binomial name
- Rhinella quechua (Gallardo, 1961)

Synonyms
- Bufo echinodes Reynolds & Foster, 1992; Bufo quechua

= Rhinella quechua =

Species of amphibian

Rhinella quechua is a species of toad in the family Bufonidae. It is endemic to Bolivia. Its natural habitats are subtropical or tropical moist montane forests, rivers, freshwater marshes, and intermittent freshwater marshes. It is threatened by habitat loss.
