= Rhinella nesiotes =

Conservation status
- Vulnerable (IUCN 3.1)

Scientific classification
- Kingdom: Animalia
- Phylum: Chordata
- Class: Amphibia
- Order: Anura
- Family: Bufonidae
- Genus: Rhinella
- Species: R. nesiotes

Binomial name
- Rhinella nesiotes (Duellman & Toft, 1979)

Synonyms
- Bufo nesiotes

Species of amphibian

Rhinella nesiotes is a species of toad in the family Bufonidae that is endemic to Peru. Its natural habitats are subtropical or tropical moist lowland forests and subtropical or tropical moist montane forests. It is threatened by habitat loss.
