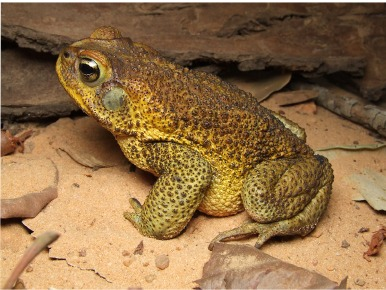

Scientific classification
- Kingdom: Animalia
- Phylum: Chordata
- Class: Amphibia
- Order: Anura
- Family: Bufonidae
- Genus: Rhinella
- Species: R. cerradensis

Binomial name
- Rhinella cerradensis Maciel, Brandão, Campos, and Sebben, 2007

= Rhinella cerradensis =

Species of amphibian

Rhinella cerradensis is a species of toad in the family Bufonidae. It lives in South America.
