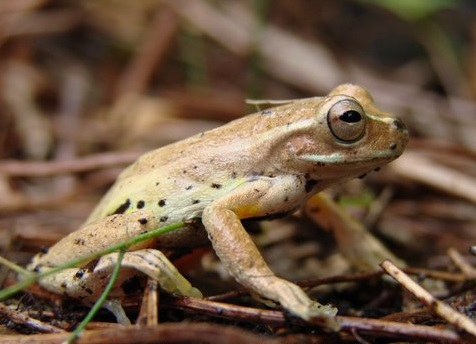

Conservation status
- Least Concern (IUCN 3.1)

Scientific classification
- Kingdom: Animalia
- Phylum: Chordata
- Class: Amphibia
- Order: Anura
- Family: Hylidae
- Genus: Dendropsophus
- Species: D. padreluna

Binomial name
- Dendropsophus padreluna (Kaplan and Ruíz-Carranza, 1997)

Synonyms
- Hyla padreluna Kaplan and Ruíz-Carranza, 1997

= Dendropsophus padreluna =

Species of frog

Dendropsophus padreluna is a species of frog in the family Hylidae. It is endemic to Colombia, being only known from its type locality in Albán, Cundinamarca Department.

These frogs live in shrubs in flooded grassland, pastures, marshes, and temporary pools. Despite its limited distribution, Dendropsophus padreluna is an abundant species and it is not considered threatened.
