= Dendropsophus reichlei =

Scientific classification
- Kingdom: Animalia
- Phylum: Chordata
- Class: Amphibia
- Order: Anura
- Family: Hylidae
- Genus: Dendropsophus
- Species: D. reichlei

Binomial name
- Dendropsophus reichlei Moravec, Aparicio, Guerrero-Reinhard, Calderon, and Köhler, 2008

Species of frog

Dendropsophus reichlei is a frog in the family Hylidae endemic to Bolivia, Peru, and Brazil.

The adult male frog measures 17.7–19.0 mm in snout-vent length and one adult female was 21.5 mm long. This frog has smooth skin on its back with only a few small tubercules. Its skin is light brown to red-brown to purple-brown in color. It has many small spots and marks. The area around its tympanum is dark in color. There are one or two small white spots under the eye. The inner skin of the hind legs meets is yellow or orange. The throat and belly are yellow. This frog has some webbed skin on its front feet and more on its hind feet.

This frog arboreal, dwelling in the forest canopy of swamps, flooded places, and terra firma forests. Its habitat has many herbaceous plants, ferns, and palms.
