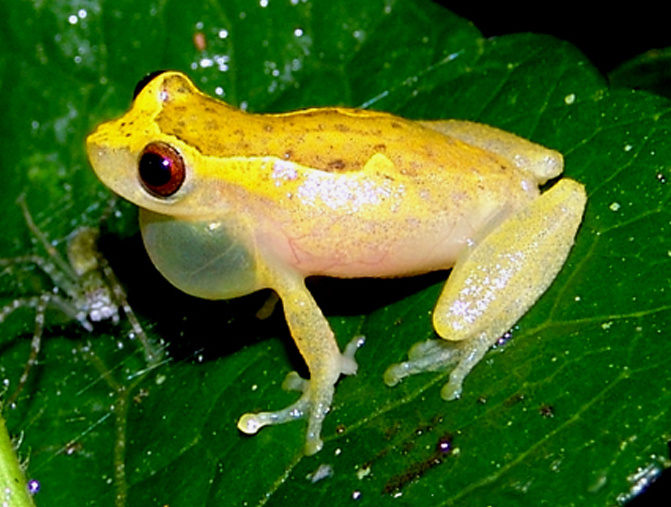
- Brazilian coastal tree frog (Dendropsophus decipiens)

Scientific classification
- Kingdom: Animalia
- Phylum: Chordata
- Class: Amphibia
- Order: Anura
- Family: Hylidae
- Tribe: Dendropsophini
- Genus: Dendropsophus; Fitzinger, 1843

Species
- See text.

= Dendropsophus =

Genus of amphibians

Dendropsophus is a genus of frogs in the family Hylidae. They are distributed in Central and South America, from southern Mexico to northern Argentina and Uruguay. They are sometimes known under the common name Fitzinger neotropical treefrogs or yellow treefrogs

This genus was resurrected in 2005 following a major revision of the family Hylidae. The species believed to have 30 chromosomes, previously placed in the genus Hyla, were later moved to this genus.

== Species ==
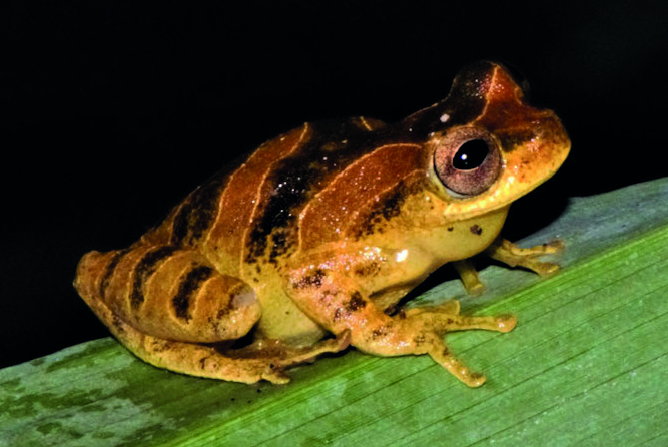
Dendropsophus amicorum

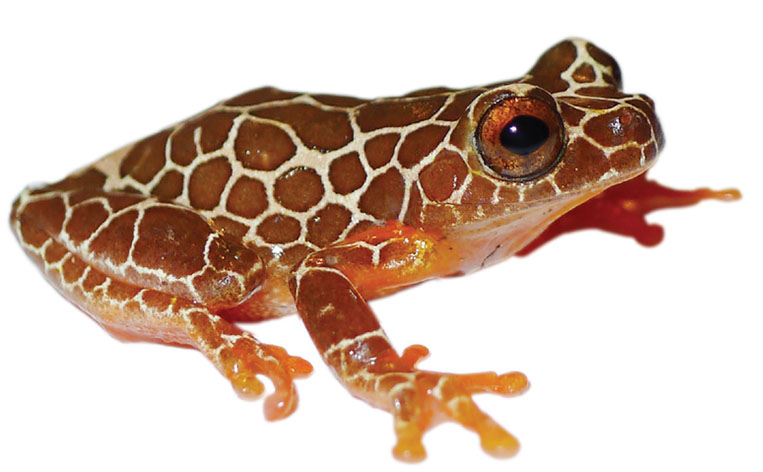
Dendropsophus arndti

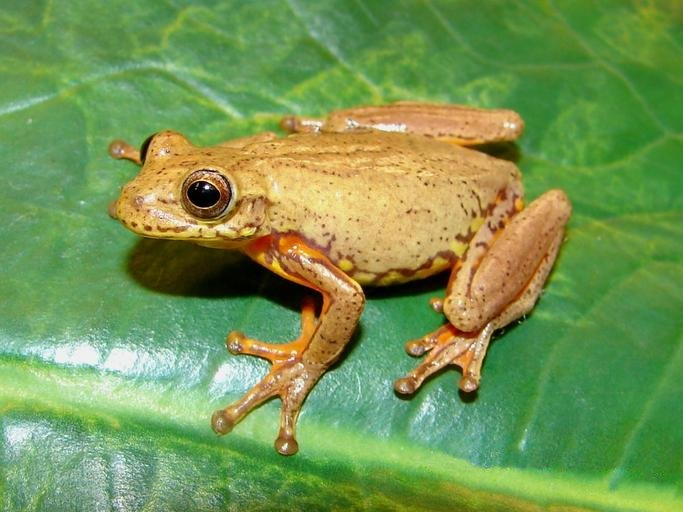
Dendropsophus bogerti

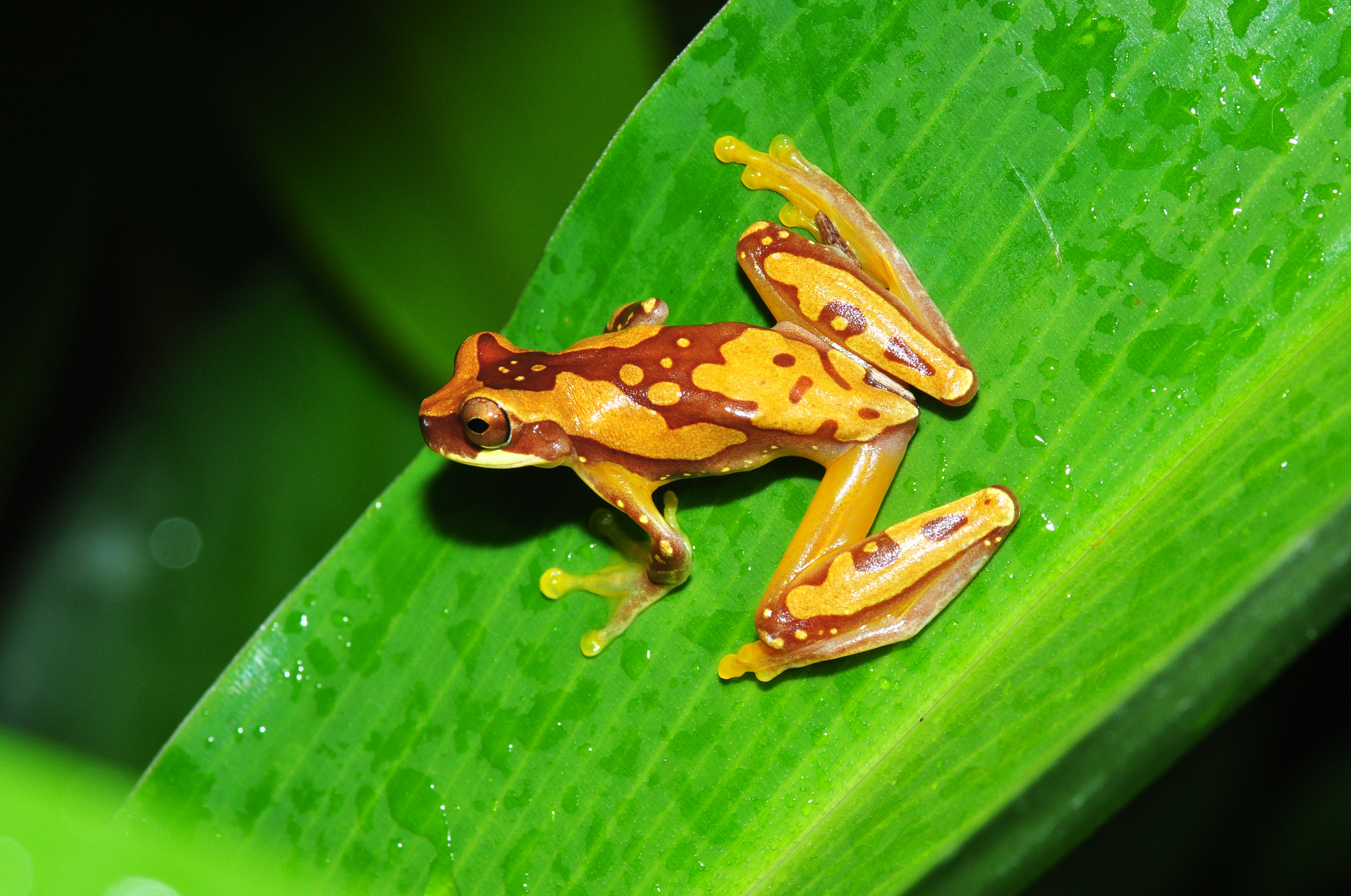
Dendropsophus ebraccatus

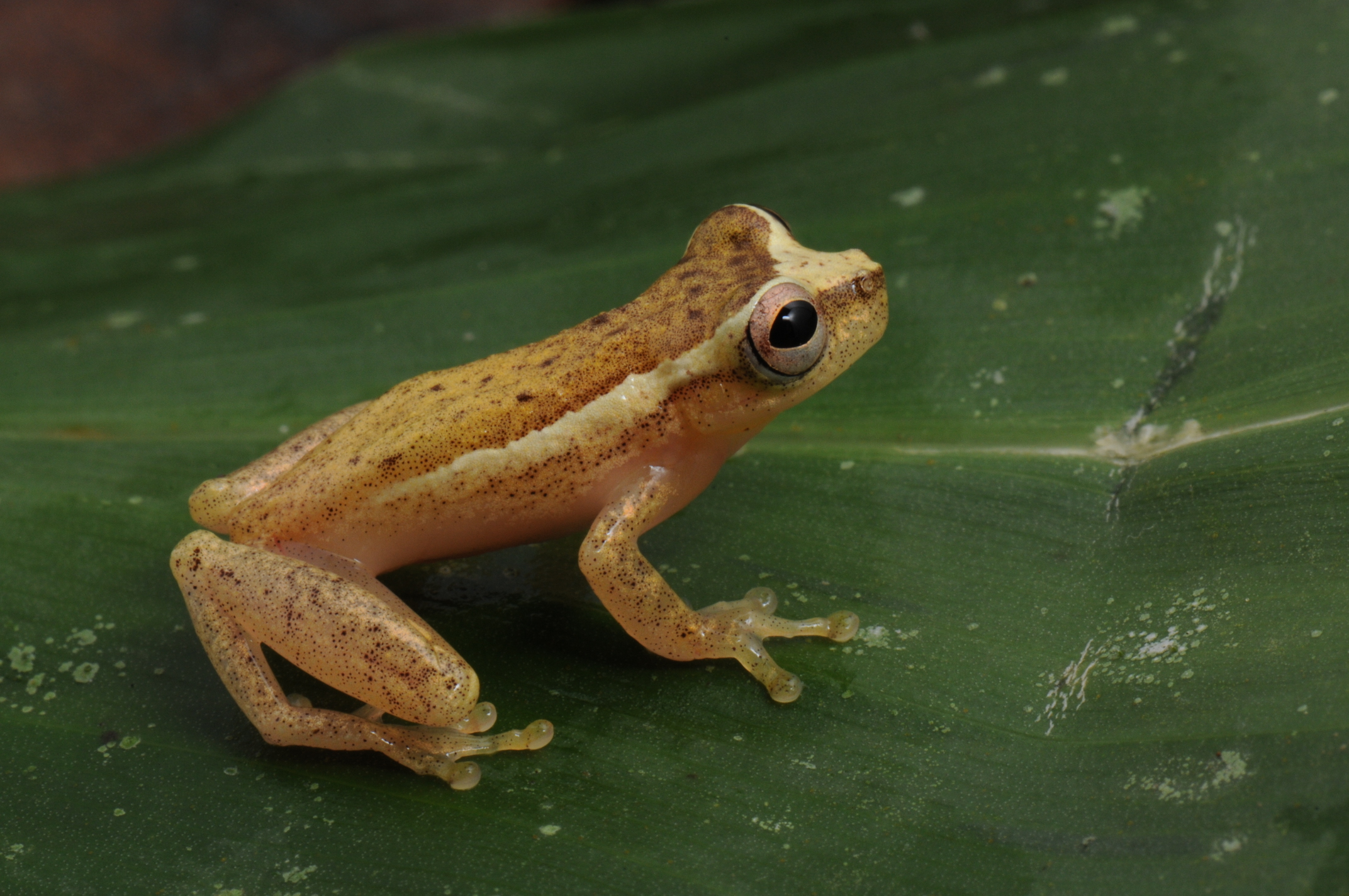
Dendropsophus haddadi

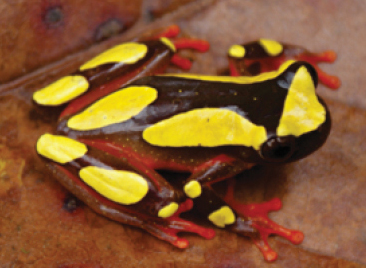
Dendropsophus leucophyllatus

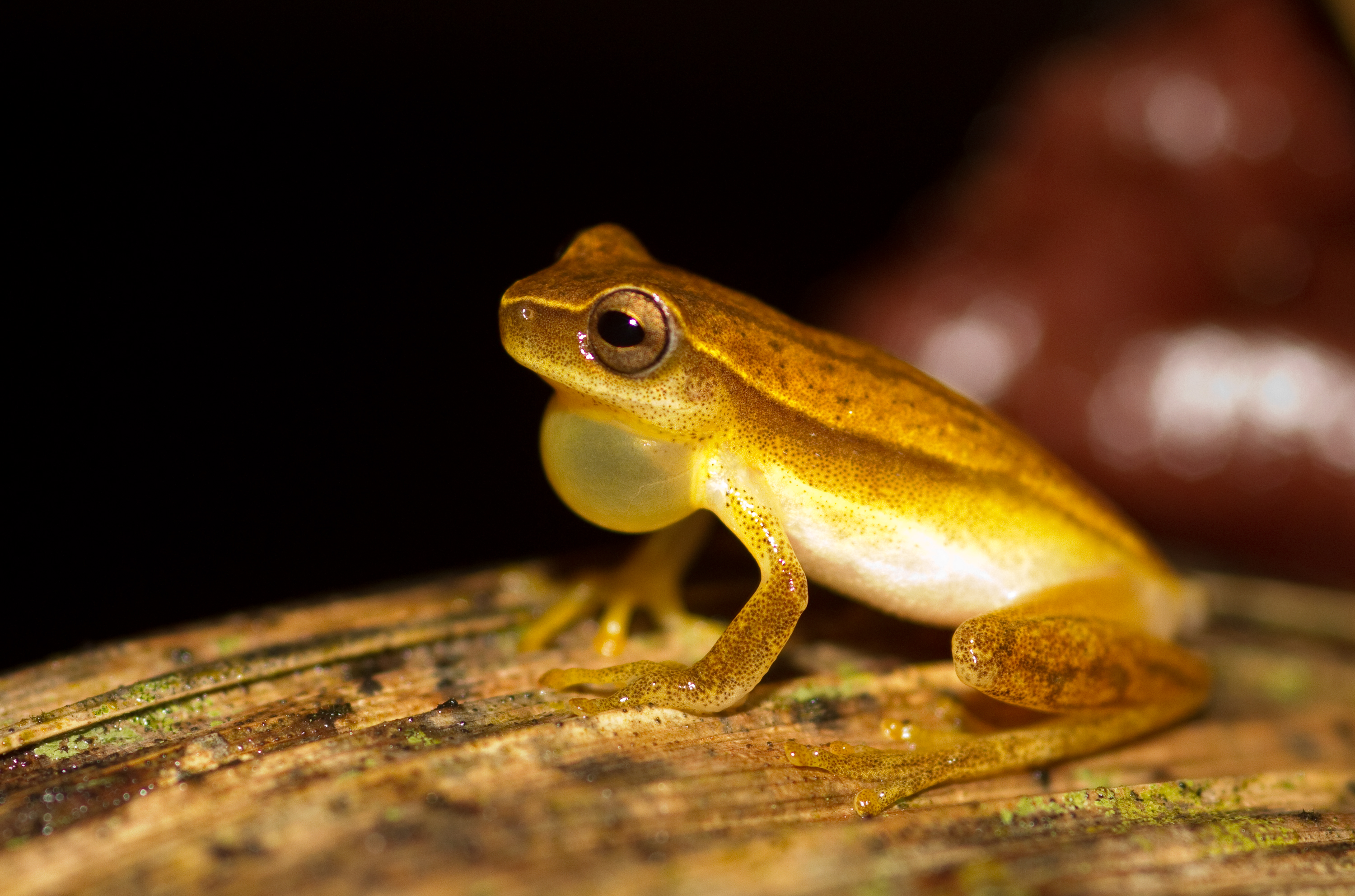
Dendropsophus microcephalus

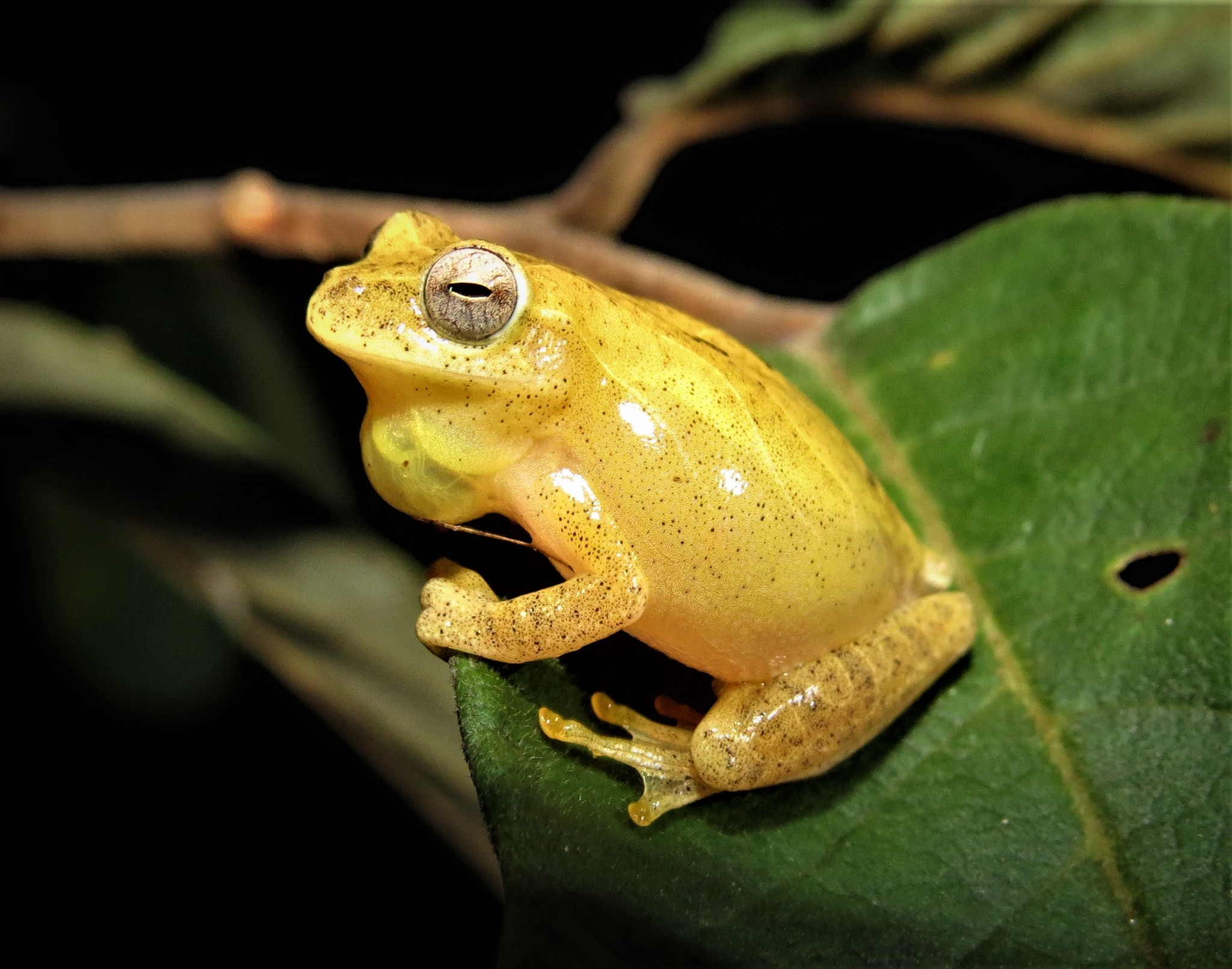
Dendropsophus minutus

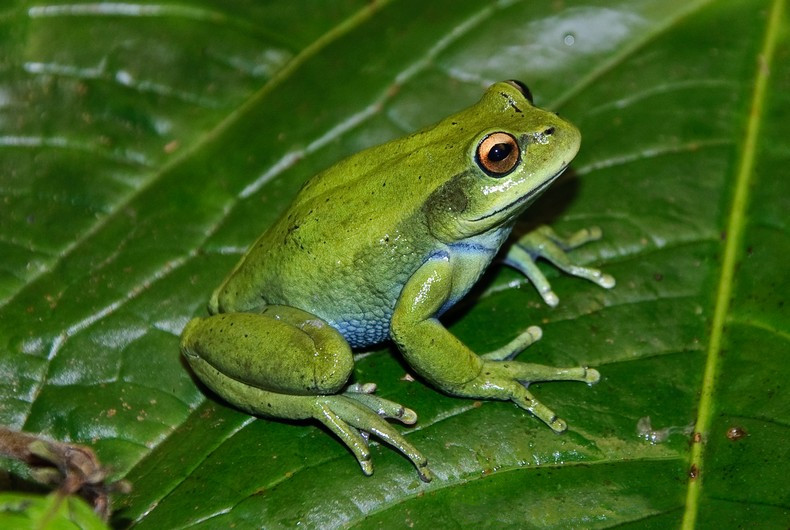
Dendropsophus molitor

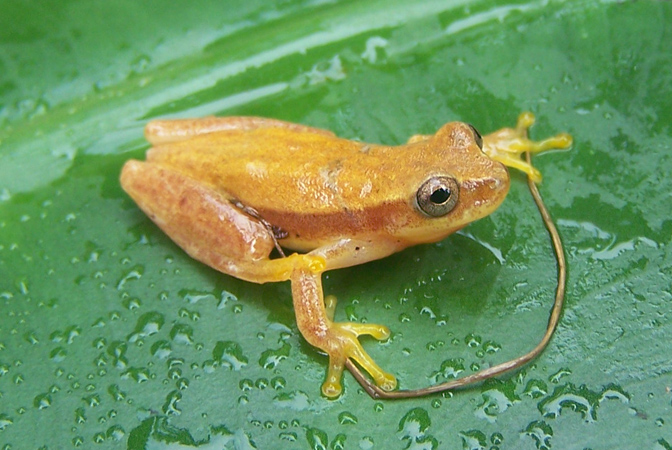
Dendropsophus robertmerternsi

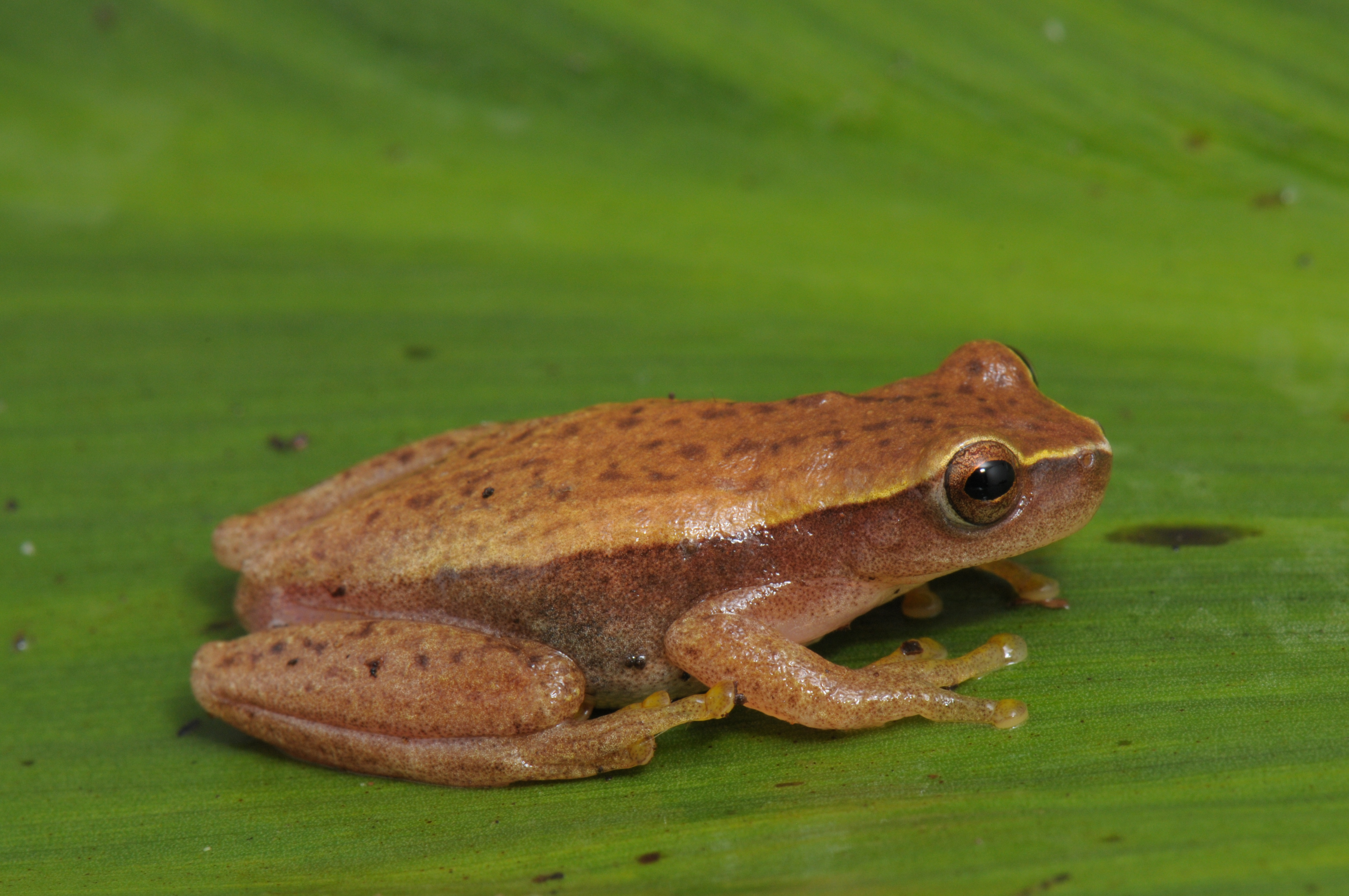
Dendropsophus sanborni

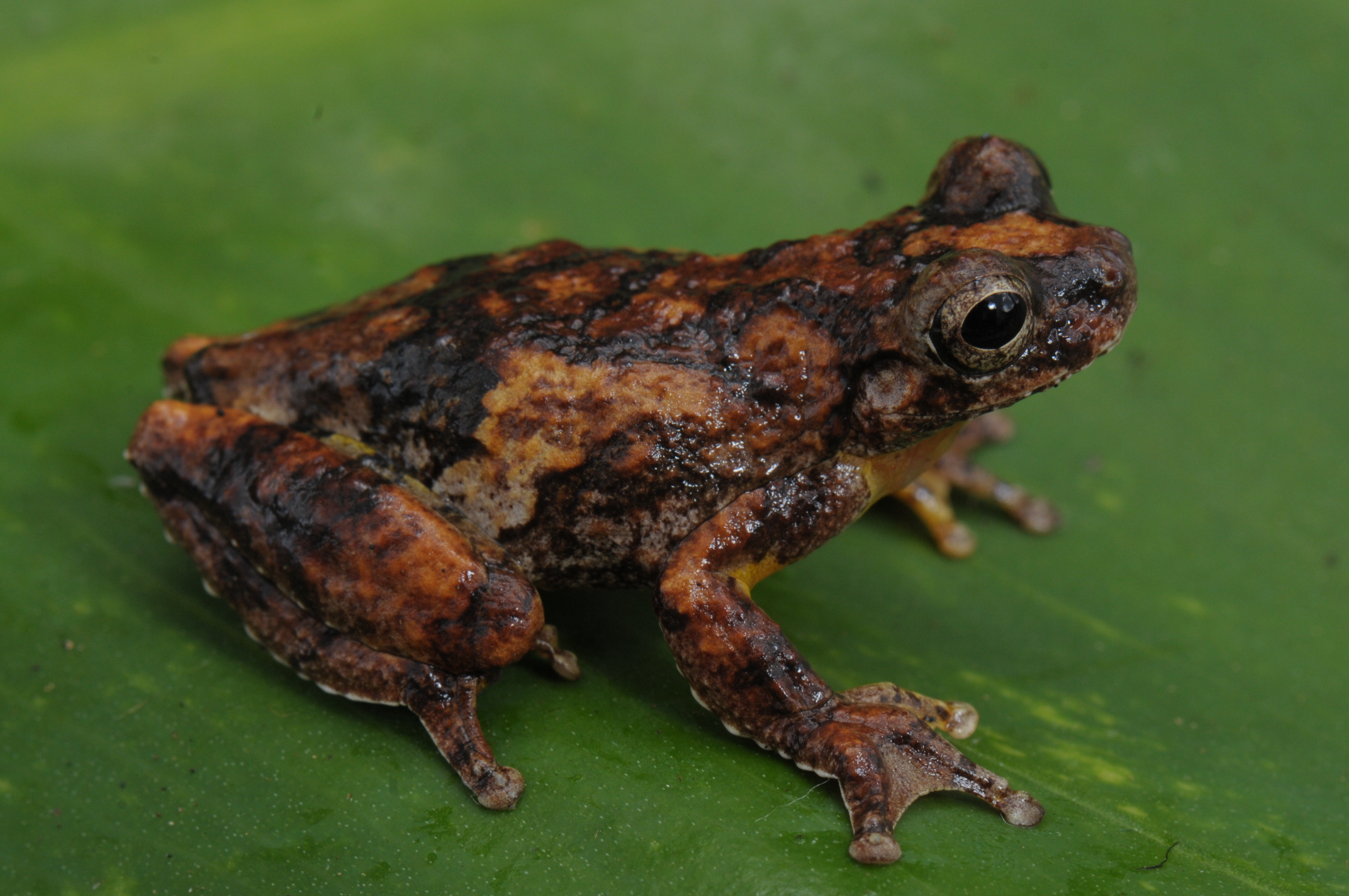
Dendropsophus seniculus

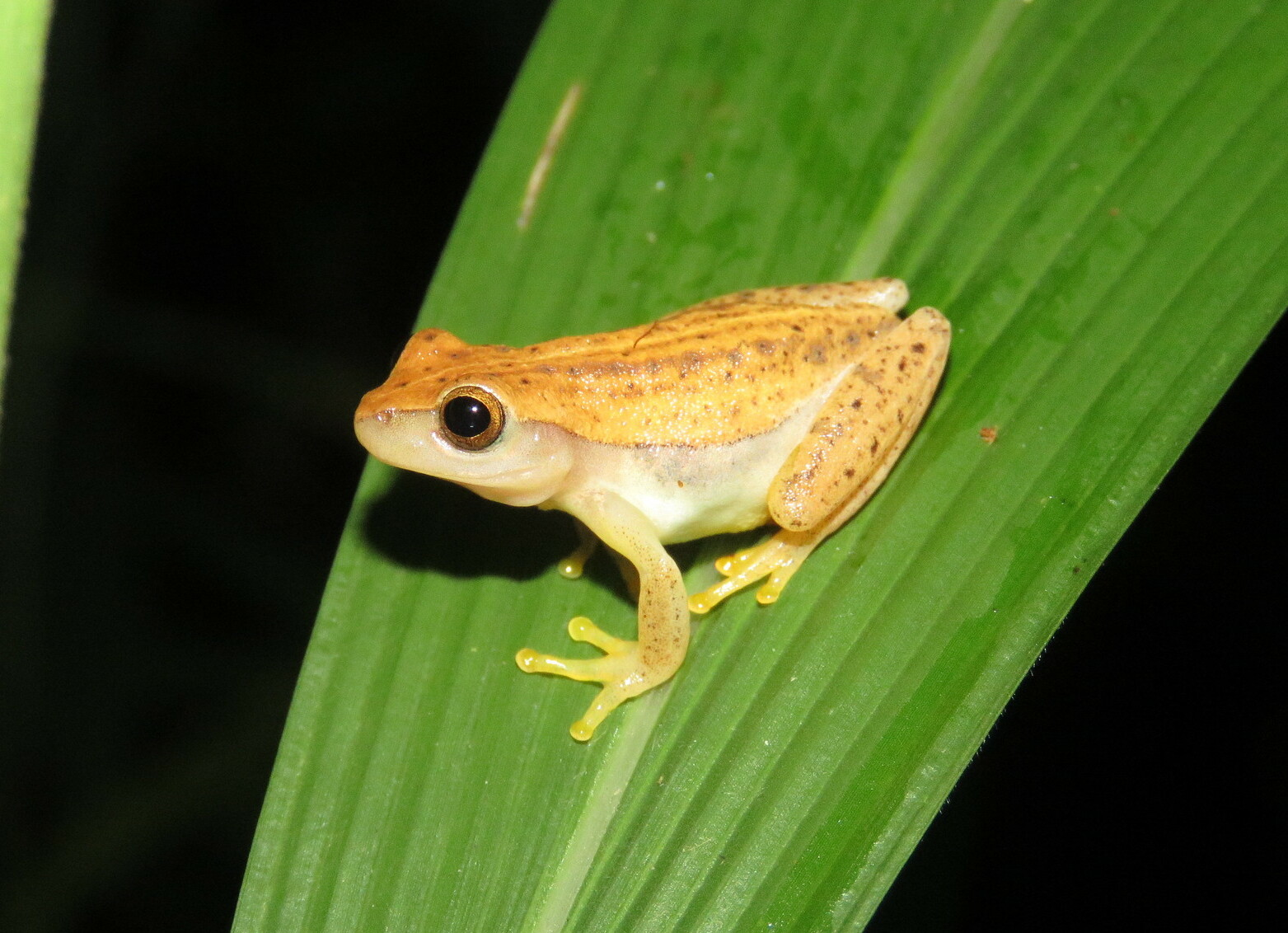
Dendropsophus walfordi

The following species are recognised in the genus Dendropsophus:

Binomial name and author	Common name
D. acreanus (Bokermann, 1964)	Acre tree frog
D. amicorum (Mijares-Urrutia, 1998)
D. anataliasiasi (Bokermann, 1972)	Goias tree frog
D. anceps (Lutz, 1929)	Estrella tree frog
D. aperomeus (Duellman, 1982)	Balzapata tree frog
D. araguaya (Napoli & Caramaschi, 1998)
D. arndti (Jansen 2017)
D. battersbyi (Rivero, 1961)	Battersby's tree frog
D. berthalutzae (Bokermann, 1962)	Bertha's tree frog
D. bifurcus (Andersson, 1945)	Upper Amazon tree frog
D. bilobatus (Ferrão, Moravec, Hanken & Lima, 2020)
D. bipunctatus (Spix, 1824)	Two-spotted tree frog
D. bogerti (Cochran & Goin, 1970)
D. bokermanni (Goin, 1960)	Bokermann's Tarauaca tree frog
D. branneri (Cochran, 1948)
D. brevifrons (Duellman & Crump, 1974)	Crump tree frog
D. bromeliaceus Ferreira, Faivovich, Beard, and Pombal, 2015	Teresensis' bromeliad treefrog
D. cachimbo (Napoli & Caramaschi, 1999)
D. carnifex (Duellman, 1969)	Executioner tree frog
D. cerradensis (Napoli & Caramaschi, 1998)
D. coffeus (Köhler, Jungfer & Reichle, 2005)
D. columbianus (Boettger, 1892)	Boettger's Colombian tree frog
D. counani Fouquet, Orrico, Ernst, Blanc, Martinez, Vacher, Rodrigues, Ouboter, Jairam, and Ron, 2015
D. cruzi (Pombal & Bastos, 1998)
D. decipiens (Lutz, 1925)	Brazilian Coastal tree frog
D. delarivai (Köhler & Lötters, 2001)
D. dutrai (Gomes & Peixoto, 1996)
D. ebraccatus (Cope, 1874)	Hourglass tree frog
D. elegans (Wied-Neuwied, 1824)	Elegant forest tree frog
D. elianeae (Napoli & Caramaschi, 2000)
D. frosti (Motta et al., 2012)
D. garagoensis (Kaplan, 1991)	Garagoa tree frog
D. gaucheri (Lescure & Marty, 2000)
D. giesleri (Mertens, 1950)	Giesler's tree frog
D. goughi (Boulenger, 1911)
D. grandisonae (Goin, 1966)	Mazaruni tree frog
D. gryllatus (Duellman, 1973)	Pacific Lowland tree frog
D. haddadi (Bastos & Pombal, 1996)
D. haraldschultzi (Bokermann, 1962)	Harald's tree frog
D. jamesi (Moravec, Farková, Vences & Köhler, 2025)	James' tree frog
D. jimi (Napoli & Caramaschi, 1999)
D. joannae (Köhler & Lötters, 2001)
D. juliani (Moravec, Aparicio & Köhler, 2006)
D. kamagarini Rivadeneira, Venegas, and Ron, 2018
D. koechlini (Duellman and Trueb, 1989)	Koechlin's tree frog
D. kubricki Rivadeneira, Venegas, and Ron, 2018
D. leali (Bokermann, 1964)
D. leucophyllatus (Beireis, 1783)	Bereis' tree frog
D. limai (Bokermann, 1962)	Sao Vicente tree frog
D. luddeckei (Guarnizo, Escallón, Cannatella, and Amézquita, 2012)
D. luteoocellatus (Roux, 1927)	El Mene tree frog
D. manonegra (Rivera-Correa and Orrico, 2013)
D. mapinguari Peloso, Orrico, Haddad, Lima, and Sturaro, 2016
D. marmoratus (Laurenti, 1768)	Marbled tree frog
D. mathiassoni (Cochran & Goin, 1970)	Mathiasson's tree frog
D. melanargyreus (Cope, 1887)	Interior tree frog
D. meridensis (Rivero, 1961)	Mérida tree frog
D. meridianus (Lutz, 1954)
D. microcephalus (Cope, 1886)	Yellow tree frog
D. microps (Peters, 1872)	Nova Friburgo tree frog
D. minimus (Ahl, 1933)	Taperinha tree frog
D. minusculus (Rivero, 1971)	Rivero's tiny tree frog
D. minutus (Peters, 1872)	Lesser tree frog
D. miyatai (Vigle & Goberdhan-Vigle, 1990)	Hosteria La Selva tree frog
D. molitor (Schmidt, 1857)	Green dotted treefrog
D. nahdereri (Lutz & Bokermann, 1963)	Estrada Saraiva tree frog
D. nanus (Boulenger, 1889)	Dwarf tree frog
D. nekronastes (Dias, Haddad, Argôlo & Orrico, 2017)
D. norandinus (Rivera-Correa and Gutiérrez-Cárdenas, 2012)
D. novaisi (Bokermann, 1968)	Bokermann's tree frog
D. oliveirai (Bokermann, 1963)	Xeric tree frog
D. ozzyi Orrico, Peloso, Sturaro, Silva, Neckel-Oliveira, Gordo, Faivovich, and Haddad, 2014
D. padreluna (Kaplan & Ruiz-Carranza, 1997)
D. parviceps (Boulenger, 1882)	Sarayacu tree frog
D. pauiniensis (Heyer, 1977)	Pauini tree frog
D. pelidna (Duellman, 1989)	Betania tree frog
D. phlebodes (Stejneger, 1906)	San Carlos tree frog
D. praestans (Duellman & Trueb, 1983)	San Agustin tree frog
D. pseudomeridianus (Cruz, Caramaschi & Dias, 2000)
D. reichlei (Moravec, Aparicio, Guerrero-Reinhard, Calderon & Köhler, 2008)
D. reticulatus (Jiménez de la Espada, 1870)
D. rhea (Napoli and Caramaschi, 1999)
D. rhodopeplus (Günther, 1858)	Red-skirted tree frog
D. riveroi (Cochran & Goin, 1970)	Rivero's Amazon tree frog
D. robertmertensi (Taylor, 1937)	Mertens' yellow tree frog
D. rossalleni (Goin, 1959)	Ross Allen's tree frog
D. rozenmani Jansen, Santana, Teixeira, and Köhler, 2019
D. rubicundulus (Reinhardt & Lütken, 1862)	Lagoa Santa tree frog
D. ruschii (Weygoldt & Peixoto, 1987)	Rusch's tree frog
D. salli (Jungfer, Reichle, and Piskurek, 2010)
D. sanborni (Schmidt, 1944)	Sanborn's tree frog
D. sarayacuensis (Shreve, 1935)	Shreve's Sarayacu tree frog
D. sartori (Smith, 1951)	Taylor's yellow tree frog
D. schubarti (Bokermann, 1963)	Schubart's Rondonia tree frog
D. seniculus (Cope, 1868)	Corcovado tree frog
D. shiwiarum (Ortega-Andrade & Ron, 2013)
D. soaresi (Caramaschi & Jim, 1983)	Picos tree frog
D. stingi (Kaplan, 1994)	Kaplan's Garagoa tree frog
D. studerae (Carvalho e Silva, de Carvalho e Silva & Izecksohn, 2003)
D. subocularis (Dunn, 1934)	Rio Tuquesa tree frog
D. timbeba (Martins & Cardoso, 1987)	Cardoso's tree frog
D. tintinnabulum (Melin, 1941)	Rio Uaupes tree frog
D. triangulum (Günther, 1869)	Triangle tree frog
D. tritaeniatus (Bokermann, 1965)	Three-banded tree frog
D. virolinensis (Kaplan & Ruiz-Carranza, 1997)
D. walfordi (Bokermann, 1962)
D. werneri (Cochran, 1952)	Bailey's tree frog
D. xapuriensis (Martins & Cardoso, 1987)	Xapuri tree frog
D. yaracuyanus (Mijares-Urrutia & Rivero, 2000)
