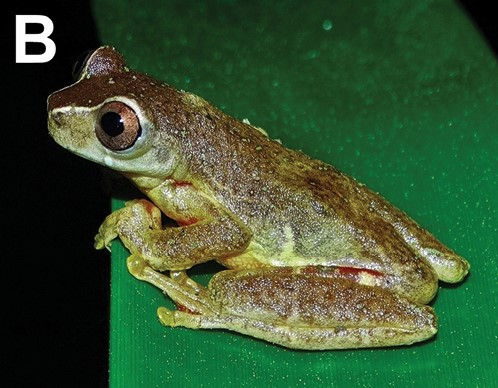

Conservation status
- Data Deficient (IUCN 3.1)

Scientific classification
- Kingdom: Animalia
- Phylum: Chordata
- Class: Amphibia
- Order: Anura
- Family: Hylidae
- Genus: Dendropsophus
- Species: D. ruschii

Binomial name
- Dendropsophus ruschii (Weygoldt & Peixoto, 1987)

= Dendropsophus ruschii =

Rusch's Tree Frog

Species of frog

Dendropsophus ruschii is a species of frog in the family Hylidae. It is endemic to Brazil. Its natural habitats are subtropical or tropical moist lowland forests and rivers and is threatened by habitat loss.
