= Dendropsophus delarivai =

Conservation status
- Least Concern (IUCN 3.1)

Scientific classification
- Kingdom: Animalia
- Phylum: Chordata
- Class: Amphibia
- Order: Anura
- Family: Hylidae
- Genus: Dendropsophus
- Species: D. delarivai

Binomial name
- Dendropsophus delarivai (Köhler & Lötters, 2001)

Species of amphibian

Dendropsophus delarivai is a species of frogs in the family Hylidae.

It is found in Bolivia, possibly Brazil, and possibly Peru.

Its natural habitats are subtropical or tropical dry forests, swamps, freshwater marshes, intermittent freshwater marshes, rural gardens, and heavily degraded former forest.
