= Dendropsophus subocularis =

Conservation status
- Least Concern (IUCN 3.1)

Scientific classification
- Kingdom: Animalia
- Phylum: Chordata
- Class: Amphibia
- Order: Anura
- Family: Hylidae
- Genus: Dendropsophus
- Species: D. subocularis

Binomial name
- Dendropsophus subocularis (Dunn, 1934)

Synonyms
- Hyla subocularis Dunn, 1934

Species of frog

Dendropsophus subocularis is a species of frog in the family Hylidae. It is found in eastern Panama and northwestern Colombia to the Magdalena River Valley. It occurs from the sea level to at least 800 m (2,600 ft), and perhaps as high as 1,650 m (5,410 ft) above sea level.

== Description ==
Males measure up to 23 mm (0.91 in) and females to 26 mm (1.0 in) in snout–vent length. The dorsum is yellowish-tan with some darker brown pigmentation or other markings, sometimes forming a faint "X" just behind the head. There is usually dark barring on the upper surfaces of the arms and legs. The ventrum is creamy white. The webbing of the feet is more extensive than that of the hands. Digits bear large terminal discs.

The eggs are bright yellow. The tadpoles are mostly black.

== Habitat and conservation ==
The species' natural habitats are humid lowland forests. It tolerates some habitat modification. It is an arboreal species that breeds in temporary and permanent pools. The eggs are laid on vegetation overhanging water. The species is threatened by habitat loss (deforestation).
