= Dendropsophus salli =

Scientific classification
- Kingdom: Animalia
- Phylum: Chordata
- Class: Amphibia
- Order: Anura
- Family: Hylidae
- Genus: Dendropsophus
- Species: D. salli

Binomial name
- Dendropsophus salli Jungfer, Reichle, and Piskurek, 2010

Species of frog

Dendropsophus salli is a frog in the family Hylidae. It is endemic to Bolivia, Peru, and Brazil.

== Initial description ==
- Karl-Heinz Jungfer; Steffen Reichle; Oliver Piskurek (2010). "Description of a new cryptic southwestern Amazonian species of leaf-gluing treefrog, genus Dendropsophus (Amphibia: Anura: Hylidae) The Nature Conservancy, Southern Andes Conservation Program". Salamandra (Abstract). 46 (4).
