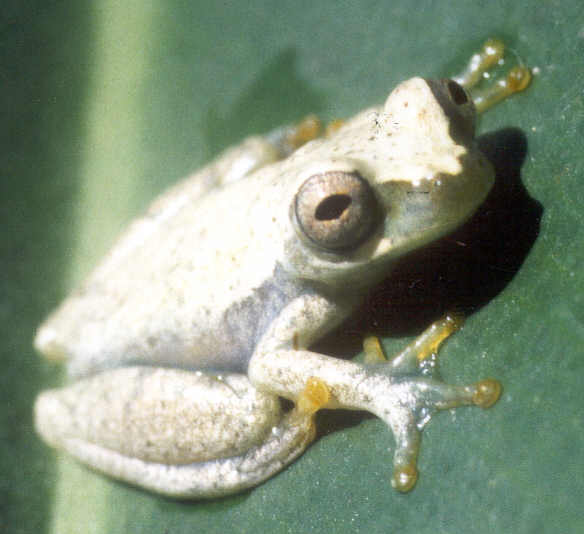

Conservation status
- Least Concern (IUCN 3.1)

Scientific classification
- Kingdom: Animalia
- Phylum: Chordata
- Class: Amphibia
- Order: Anura
- Family: Hylidae
- Genus: Dendropsophus
- Species: D. luteoocellatus

Binomial name
- Dendropsophus luteoocellatus (Roux, 1927)

= Dendropsophus luteoocellatus =

Species of frog

Dendropsophus luteoocellatus is a species of frog in the family Hylidae. It is endemic to Venezuela. Its natural habitats are subtropical or tropical moist lowland forests, subtropical or tropical moist montane forests, freshwater marshes, pastureland, rural gardens, heavily degraded former forest, urban sewer systems and ponds.
