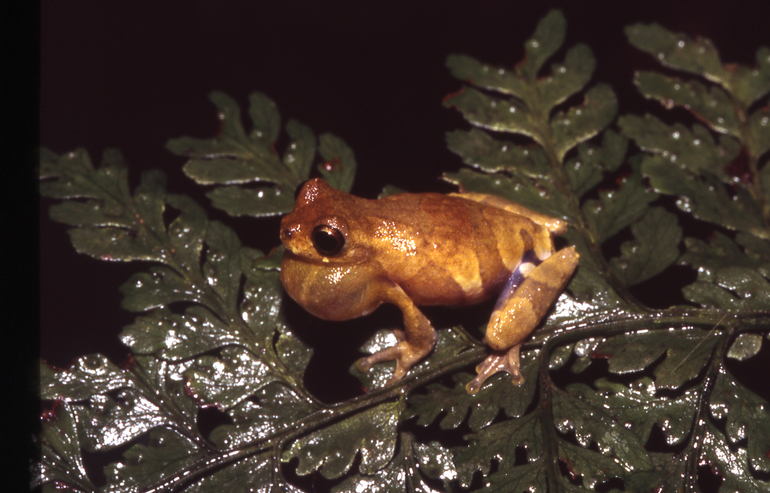

Conservation status
- Least Concern (IUCN 3.1)

Scientific classification
- Kingdom: Animalia
- Phylum: Chordata
- Class: Amphibia
- Order: Anura
- Family: Hylidae
- Genus: Dendropsophus
- Species: D. parviceps

Binomial name
- Dendropsophus parviceps (Boulenger, 1882)

= Dendropsophus parviceps =

Sarayacu treefrog

Species of frog

Dendropsophus parviceps (common name: Sarayacu treefrog) is a species of frog in the family Hylidae. It is found in the Amazon Basin of Bolivia, Brazil, Colombia, Ecuador, Peru, and Venezuela. Dendropsophus parviceps is a locally common species with no known threats. These frogs are found on the leaves and branches in primary and secondary tropical rainforest, but also in open spaces close to forests. It is found in moist habitats (swamps, temporary watercourses, permanent ponds). It breeds in temporary bodies of water. Eggs are laid in water where the tadpoles develop.
