= Dendropsophus mapinguari =

Scientific classification
- Kingdom: Animalia
- Phylum: Chordata
- Class: Amphibia
- Order: Anura
- Family: Hylidae
- Genus: Dendropsophus
- Species: D. mapinguari

Binomial name
- Dendropsophus mapinguari Peloso, Orrico, Haddad, Lima, and Sturaro, 2016

Species of frog

Dendropsophus mapinguari, the Mapinguari clown tree frog, is a frog in the family Hylidae. It is endemic to Brazil.
