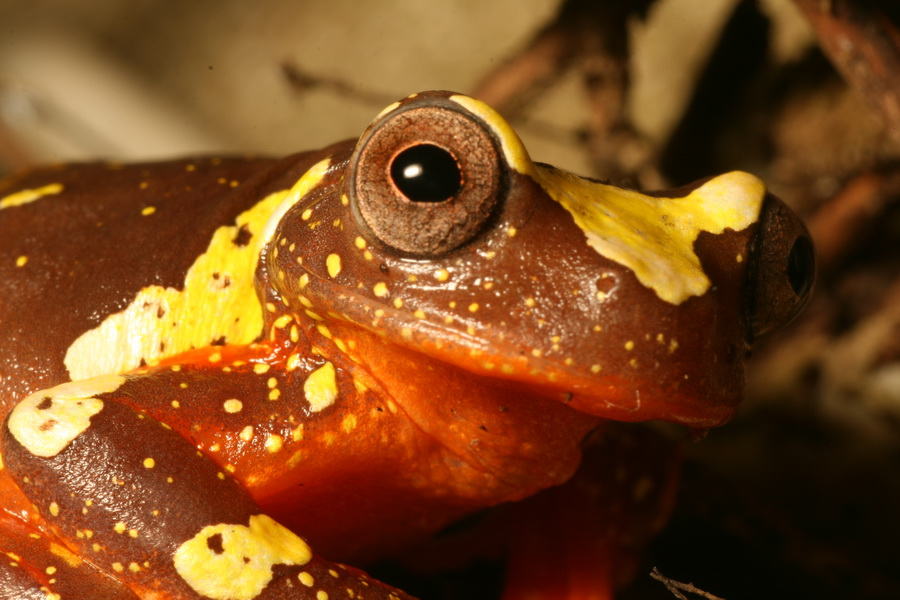

Conservation status
- Least Concern (IUCN 3.1)

Scientific classification
- Kingdom: Animalia
- Phylum: Chordata
- Class: Amphibia
- Order: Anura
- Family: Hylidae
- Genus: Dendropsophus
- Species: D. sarayacuensis

Binomial name
- Dendropsophus sarayacuensis (Shreve, 1935)

Synonyms
- ssp. sarayacuensis Shreve, 1935

= Dendropsophus sarayacuensis =

Species of frog

Dendropsophus sarayacuensis, Shreve's Sarayacu treefrog or the clown tree frog, is a species of frog in the family Hylidae.

It is found in the Amazon Basin in Bolivia, Brazil, Ecuador, Peru, Venezuela, and—presumably—Colombia. Dendropsophus sarayacuensis is a common in parts of its range (Peru and Ecuador). It is nocturnal, arboreal frog inhabiting understorey vegetation in primary and secondary tropical rainforest and forest edges. Eggs are laid out of water whereas the tadpole develop in water, in temporary and permanent pools.

== As a pet ==
Dendropsophus sarayacuensis are sometimes kept as exotic pets.
