= Dendropsophus virolinensis =

Conservation status
- Least Concern (IUCN 3.1)

Scientific classification
- Kingdom: Animalia
- Phylum: Chordata
- Class: Amphibia
- Order: Anura
- Family: Hylidae
- Genus: Dendropsophus
- Species: D. virolinensis

Binomial name
- Dendropsophus virolinensis (Kaplan & Ruíz-Carranza, 1997)

Species of frog

Dendropsophus virolinensis is a species of frog in the family Hylidae. It is endemic to Colombia. Its natural habitats are subtropical or tropical seasonally wet or flooded lowland grassland, swamps, freshwater marshes, intermittent freshwater marshes, pastureland, and heavily degraded former forest.
