= Dendropsophus schubarti =

Conservation status
- Least Concern (IUCN 3.1)

Scientific classification
- Kingdom: Animalia
- Phylum: Chordata
- Class: Amphibia
- Order: Anura
- Family: Hylidae
- Genus: Dendropsophus
- Species: D. schubarti

Binomial name
- Dendropsophus schubarti (Bokermann, 1963)

Species of frog

Dendropsophus schubarti (known as Schubart's Rondonia Treefrog) is a species of frog in the family Hylidae. It is found in Bolivia, Brazil and Peru. Its natural habitats are subtropical or tropical moist lowland forests and swamps.
