= Dendropsophus yaracuyanus =

Conservation status
- Endangered (IUCN 3.1)

Scientific classification
- Kingdom: Animalia
- Phylum: Chordata
- Class: Amphibia
- Order: Anura
- Family: Hylidae
- Genus: Dendropsophus
- Species: D. yaracuyanus

Binomial name
- Dendropsophus yaracuyanus Mijares-Urrutia & Rivero, 2000

Species of frog

Dendropsophus yaracuyanus is a species of frog in the family Hylidae. It is endemic to Venezuela. Its natural habitats are subtropical or tropical moist montane forests, rivers, freshwater marshes, and intermittent freshwater marshes. It is threatened by habitat loss.
