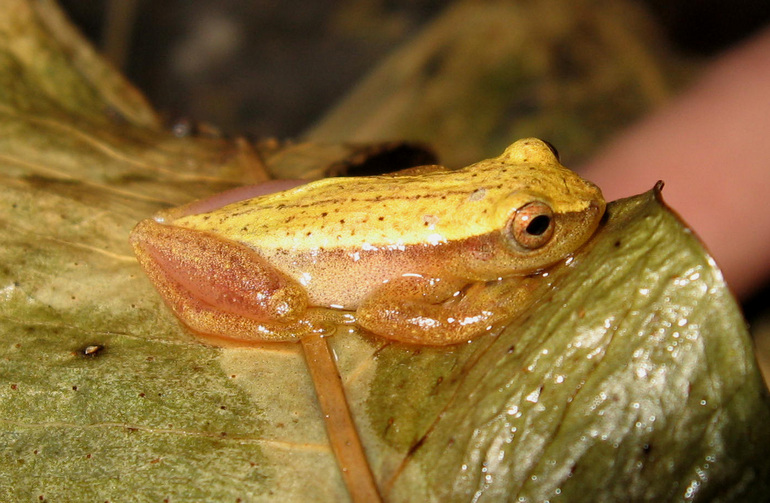

Conservation status
- Least Concern (IUCN 3.1)

Scientific classification
- Kingdom: Animalia
- Phylum: Chordata
- Class: Amphibia
- Order: Anura
- Family: Hylidae
- Genus: Dendropsophus
- Species: D. sanborni

Binomial name
- Dendropsophus sanborni (Schmidt, 1944)

= Dendropsophus sanborni =

Species of frog

Dendropsophus sanborni is a species of frog in the family Hylidae. It is found in Argentina, Brazil, Paraguay, and Uruguay. Its natural habitats are moist savanna, subtropical or tropical dry lowland grassland, subtropical or tropical seasonally wet or flooded lowland grassland, freshwater marshes, intermittent freshwater marshes, plantations, ponds, canals, and ditches.
