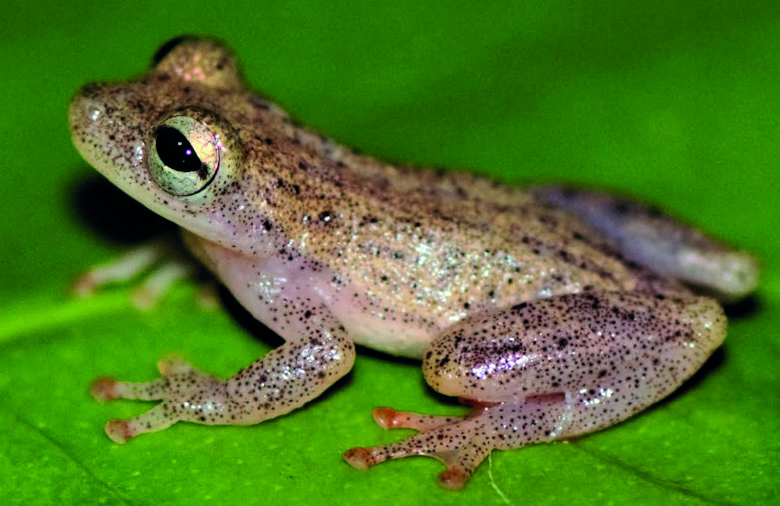
- Amapá, Brazil

Conservation status
- Least Concern (IUCN 3.1)

Scientific classification
- Kingdom: Animalia
- Phylum: Chordata
- Class: Amphibia
- Order: Anura
- Family: Hylidae
- Genus: Dendropsophus
- Species: D. haraldschultzi

Binomial name
- Dendropsophus haraldschultzi (Bokermann, 1962)

= Dendropsophus haraldschultzi =

Species of frog

Dendropsophus haraldschultzi is a species of frog in the family Hylidae. It is found in Brazil, Peru, possibly Bolivia, and possibly Colombia. Its natural habitats are subtropical or tropical moist lowland forests, rivers, freshwater marshes, and intermittent freshwater marshes. It is threatened by habitat loss.
