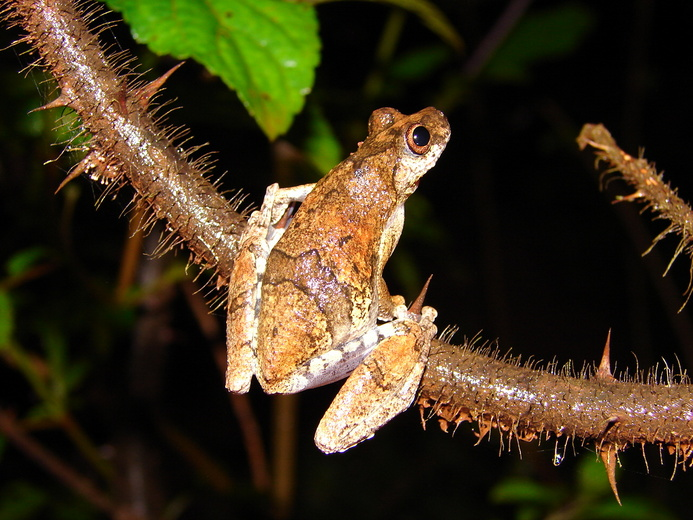

Conservation status
- Least Concern (IUCN 3.1)

Scientific classification
- Kingdom: Animalia
- Phylum: Chordata
- Class: Amphibia
- Order: Anura
- Family: Hylidae
- Genus: Dendropsophus
- Species: D. soaresi

Binomial name
- Dendropsophus soaresi (Caramaschi & Jim, 1983)

= Dendropsophus soaresi =

Species of frog

Dendropsophus soaresi is a species of frog in the family Hylidae. It is endemic to Brazil. Its natural habitats are subtropical or tropical dry forests, dry savanna, moist savanna, subtropical or tropical dry shrubland, subtropical or tropical moist shrubland, freshwater marshes, and intermittent freshwater marshes. It is threatened by habitat loss.
