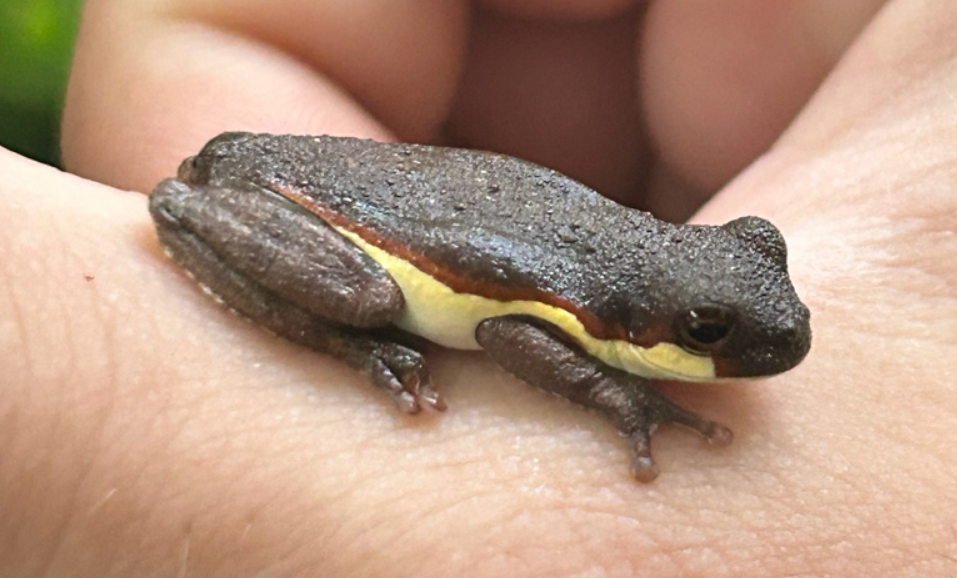

Conservation status
- Least Concern (IUCN 3.1)

Scientific classification
- Kingdom: Animalia
- Phylum: Chordata
- Class: Amphibia
- Order: Anura
- Family: Hylidae
- Genus: Dendropsophus
- Species: D. timbeba

Binomial name
- Dendropsophus timbeba (Martins & Cardoso, 1987)

Synonyms
- Dendropsophus allenorum (Duellman & Trueb, 1989)

= Dendropsophus timbeba =

Species of frog

Dendropsophus timbeba, also known as the Cuzco Reserve tree frog or Cardoso's tree frog, is a species of frog in the family Hylidae. It is found in Brazil, possibly Bolivia, and possibly Peru. Its natural habitats are subtropical or tropical moist lowland forests, intermittent freshwater marshes, rural gardens, and heavily degraded former forest.
