= Dendropsophus luddeckei =

Conservation status
- Least Concern (IUCN 3.1)

Scientific classification
- Kingdom: Animalia
- Phylum: Chordata
- Class: Amphibia
- Order: Anura
- Family: Hylidae
- Genus: Dendropsophus
- Species: D. luddeckei

Binomial name
- Dendropsophus luddeckei Guarnizo, Escallón, Cannatella and Amézquita, 2012

Species of frog

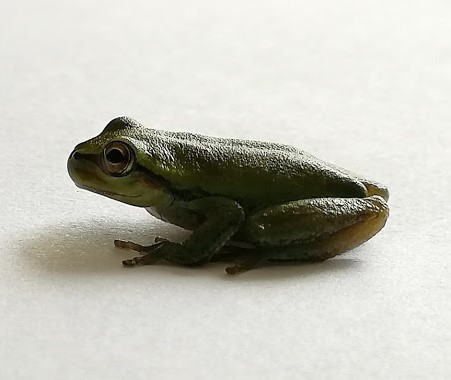

Dendropsophus luddeckei is a frog in the family Hylidae. It is endemic to Colombia. Scientists have seen it between 2000 and 4100 meters above sea level.
