= Dendropsophus tritaeniatus =

Conservation status
- Least Concern (IUCN 3.1)

Scientific classification
- Kingdom: Animalia
- Phylum: Chordata
- Class: Amphibia
- Order: Anura
- Family: Hylidae
- Genus: Dendropsophus
- Species: D. tritaeniatus

Binomial name
- Dendropsophus tritaeniatus (Bokermann, 1965)

Species of frog

Dendropsophus tritaeniatus is a species of frog in the family Hylidae. It is found in Bolivia, Brazil, and possibly Peru. Its natural habitats are moist savanna, subtropical or tropical seasonally wet or flooded lowland grassland, rivers, swamps, freshwater marshes, intermittent freshwater marshes, and pastureland. It is threatened by habitat loss.
