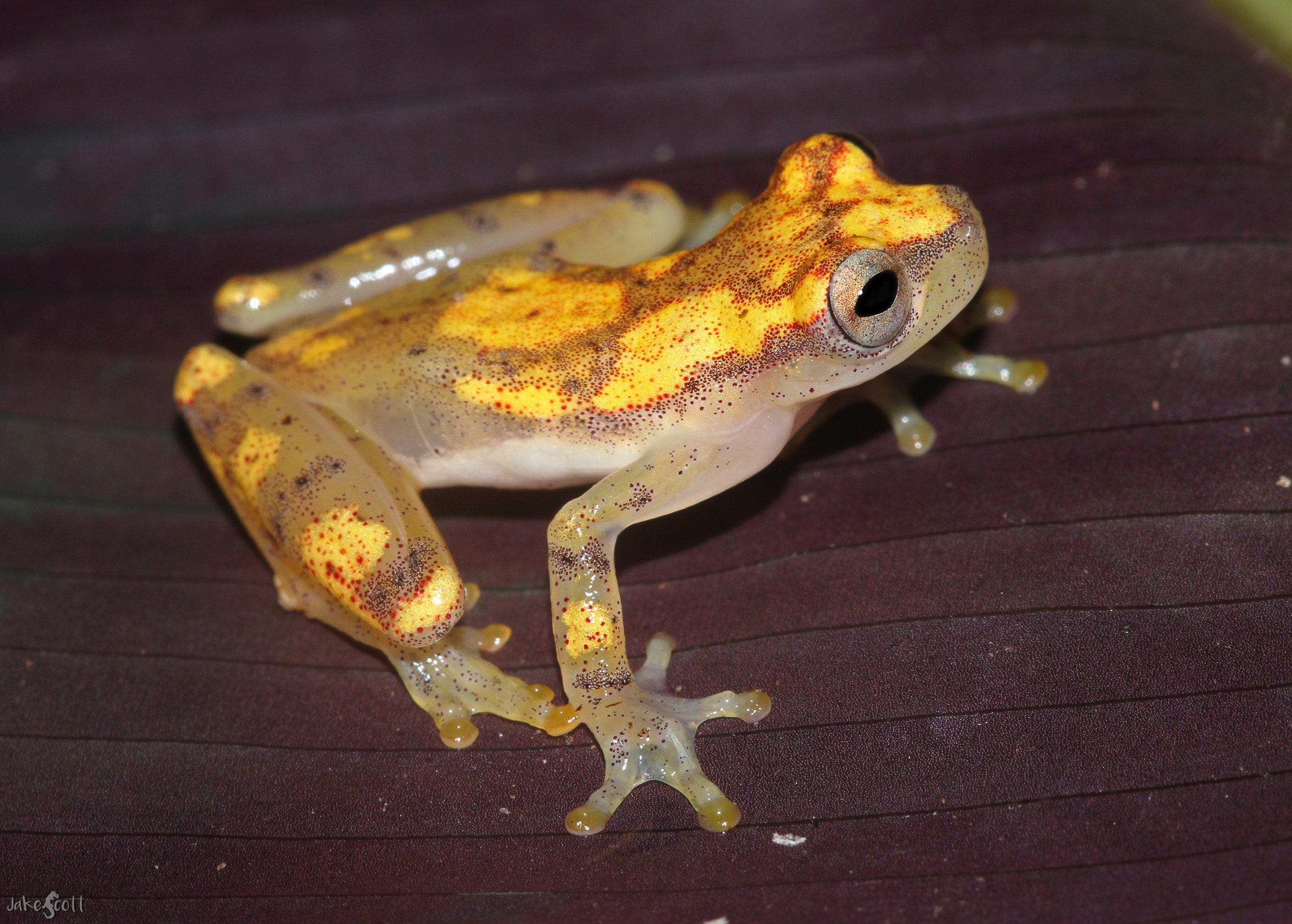

Conservation status
- Least Concern (IUCN 3.1)

Scientific classification
- Kingdom: Animalia
- Phylum: Chordata
- Class: Amphibia
- Order: Anura
- Family: Hylidae
- Genus: Dendropsophus
- Species: D. miyatai

Binomial name
- Dendropsophus miyatai (Vigle & Goberdhan-Vigle, 1990)

= Dendropsophus miyatai =

Species of frog

Dendropsophus miyatai is a species of frog in the family Hylidae. It is found in Brazil, Colombia, Ecuador, and Peru. Its natural habitats are subtropical or tropical moist lowland forests, rivers, freshwater marshes, and intermittent freshwater marshes. It is threatened by habitat loss.
