= Dendropsophus aperomeus =

Conservation status
- Least Concern (IUCN 3.1)

Scientific classification
- Kingdom: Animalia
- Phylum: Chordata
- Class: Amphibia
- Order: Anura
- Family: Hylidae
- Genus: Dendropsophus
- Species: D. aperomeus

Binomial name
- Dendropsophus aperomeus (Duellman, 1982)

Synonyms
- Hyla aperomea Duellman, 1982

Species of frog

Dendropsophus aperomeus is a species of frog in the family Hylidae. It is endemic to Peru and occurs on the Amazonian slopes of the Andes in northern and central Peru. Common name Balzapata treefrog has been coined for it.

== Description ==
Adult males measure 19–21 mm (0.7–0.8 in) and adult females, based on a single specimen, 25 mm (1.0 in) in snout–vent length. This frog has a slender overall appearance. The head is wider than the body. The snout is bluntly rounded in dorsal view and truncate in profile. The tympanum is small and barely visible; the supratympanic fold is weak but obscures the upper part of the tympanum. The fingers are short, bear moderately large, rounded discs, and are about half-webbed. The toes are moderately long, bear rounded discs slightly smaller than those on the fingers, and are about three-quarters webbed. The dorsum is yellowish tan, pale brown, or reddish brown, and has a variable pattern of grayish brown to brown blotches and golden flecks. The belly is white, and there is a white supra-anal stripe. The thighs are orange-tan to orange-yellow. Males have pale yellow vocal sac.

== Habitat and conservation ==
Dendropsophus aperomeus occurs in premontane forests and partially cleared cloud forests at elevations of 1,330–1,850 m (4,360–6,070 ft) above sea level. The tadpoles presumably develop in stagnant water, such as small pools. The type series was collected from a herb 10 cm above the surface of a temporary pool and from low herbaceous vegetation on a cut-over slope above a roadside pond.

This species is believed to be relatively common. Agricultural development could be a threat to it. It has been recorded in some protected areas, and could occur in several others.
