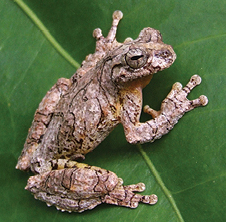

Conservation status
- Data Deficient (IUCN 3.1)

Scientific classification
- Kingdom: Animalia
- Phylum: Chordata
- Class: Amphibia
- Order: Anura
- Family: Hylidae
- Genus: Dendropsophus
- Species: D. novaisi

Binomial name
- Dendropsophus novaisi (Bokermann, 1968)

= Dendropsophus novaisi =

Species of frog

Dendropsophus novaisi is a species of frog in the family Hylidae. It is endemic to Brazil. Its natural habitats are dry savanna, moist savanna, intermittent freshwater marshes, and rocky areas. It is threatened by habitat loss.
