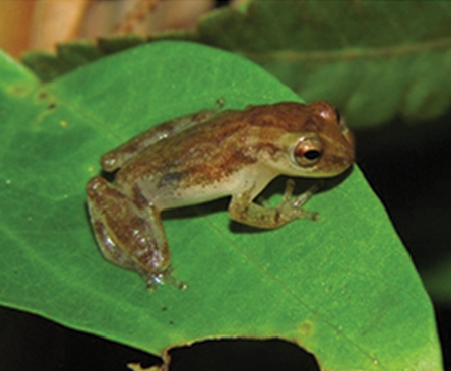

Conservation status
- Least Concern (IUCN 3.1)

Scientific classification
- Kingdom: Animalia
- Phylum: Chordata
- Class: Amphibia
- Order: Anura
- Family: Hylidae
- Genus: Dendropsophus
- Species: D. oliveirai

Binomial name
- Dendropsophus oliveirai (Bokermann, 1963)

= Dendropsophus oliveirai =

Species of frog

Dendropsophus oliveirai is a species of frog in the family Hylidae. It is endemic to Brazil. Its natural habitats are subtropical or tropical dry forests, dry savanna, freshwater marshes, and intermittent freshwater marshes. It is threatened by habitat loss.
