= Dendropsophus rhea =

Conservation status
- Data Deficient (IUCN 3.1)

Scientific classification
- Kingdom: Animalia
- Phylum: Chordata
- Class: Amphibia
- Order: Anura
- Family: Hylidae
- Genus: Dendropsophus
- Species: D. rhea

Binomial name
- Dendropsophus rhea (Napoli & Caramaschi, 1999)

Species of frog

Dendropsophus rhea is a species of frog in the family Hylidae. It is endemic to Brazil. Its natural habitats are moist savanna, freshwater marshes, and intermittent freshwater marshes. It is threatened by habitat loss.
