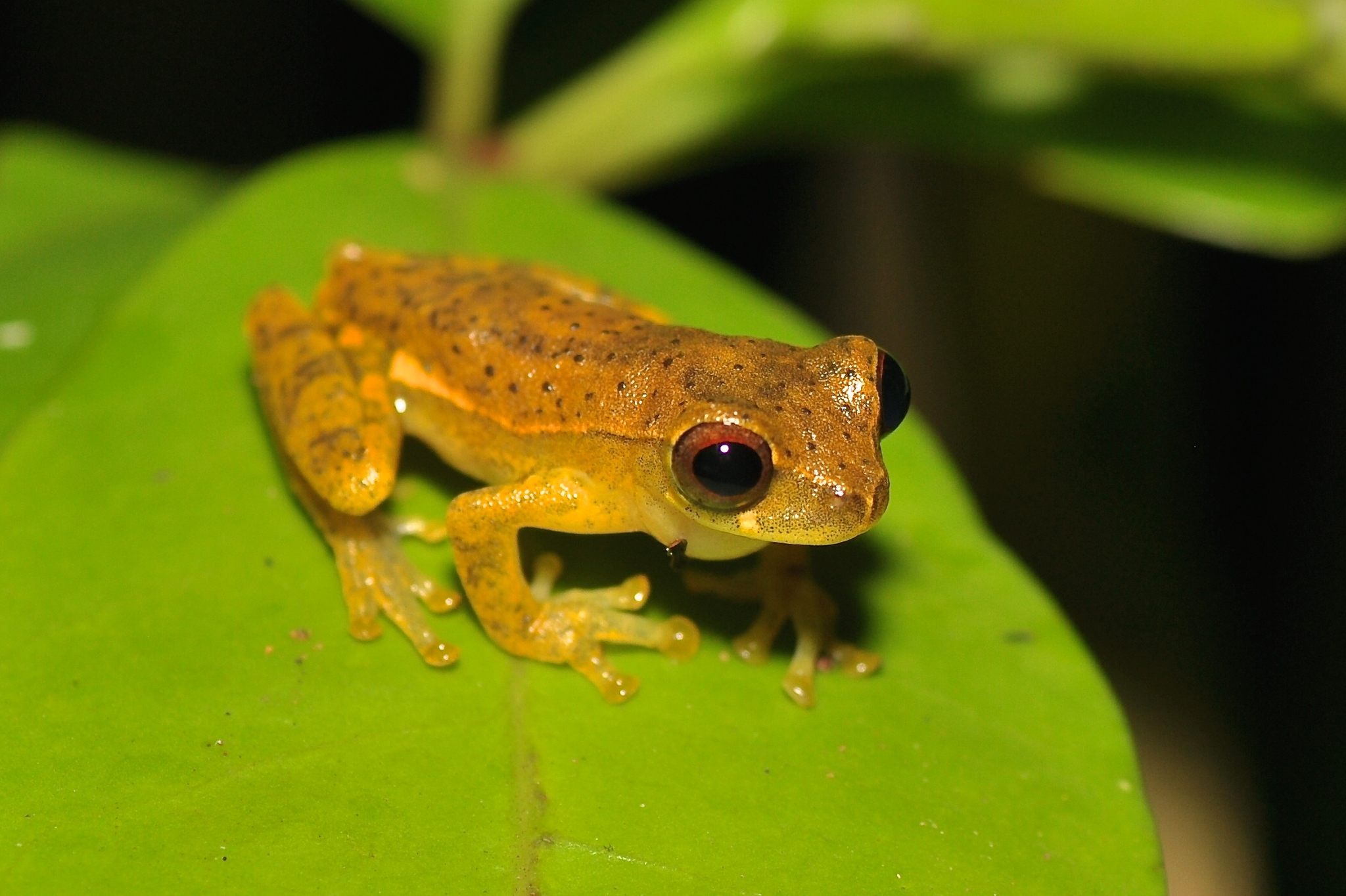

Conservation status
- Least Concern (IUCN 3.1)

Scientific classification
- Kingdom: Animalia
- Phylum: Chordata
- Class: Amphibia
- Order: Anura
- Family: Hylidae
- Genus: Dendropsophus
- Species: D. brevifrons

Binomial name
- Dendropsophus brevifrons (Duellman & Crump, 1974)

= Dendropsophus brevifrons =

Species of frog

Dendropsophus brevifrons is a species of frog in the family Hylidae. It is found in Brazil, Colombia, Ecuador, French Guiana, Peru, and possibly Suriname. Its natural habitats are subtropical or tropical moist lowland forests, subtropical or tropical swamps, subtropical or tropical high-altitude grassland, intermittent freshwater marshes, pastureland, rural gardens, and urban areas. It is threatened by habitat loss.
