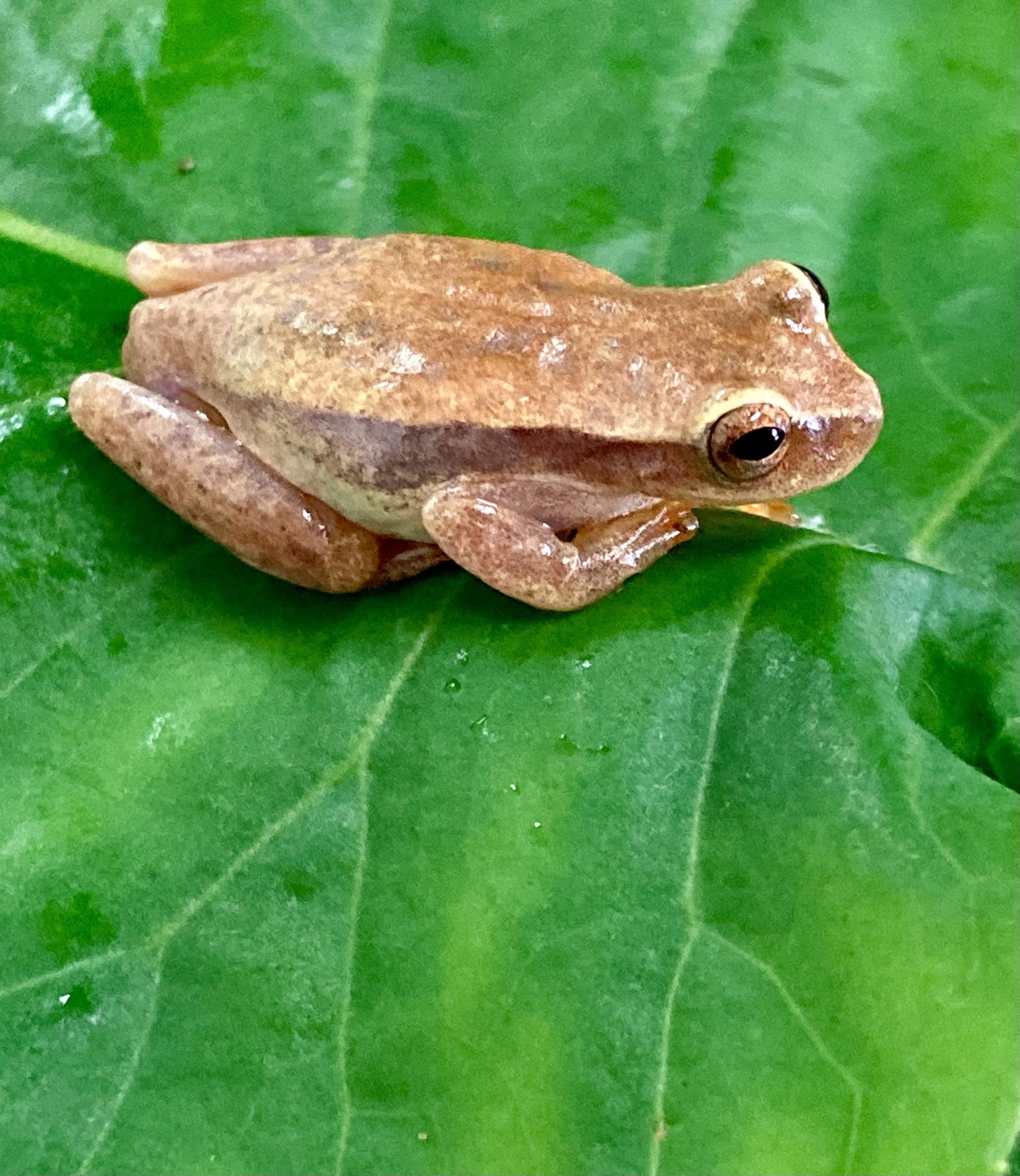

Conservation status
- Least Concern (IUCN 3.1)

Scientific classification
- Kingdom: Animalia
- Phylum: Chordata
- Class: Amphibia
- Order: Anura
- Family: Hylidae
- Genus: Dendropsophus
- Species: D. mathiassoni

Binomial name
- Dendropsophus mathiassoni (Cochran & Goin, 1970)

Synonyms
- Hyla mathiassoni Cochran & Goin, 1970; Dendropsophus mathiassoni Faivovich et al., 2005

= Dendropsophus mathiassoni =

Mathiasson's Treefrog

Species of frog

Dendropsophus mathiassoni, or Mathiasson's treefrog, is a species of frog in the family Hylidae that is endemic to Colombia. Its natural habitats are moist savanna, subtropical or tropical moist shrubland, freshwater marshes, intermittent freshwater marshes, pastureland, rural gardens, ponds, irrigated land, seasonally flooded agricultural land, and canals and ditches.
