= Dendropsophus shiwiarum =

Scientific classification
- Kingdom: Animalia
- Phylum: Chordata
- Class: Amphibia
- Order: Anura
- Family: Hylidae
- Genus: Dendropsophus
- Species: D. shiwiarum

Binomial name
- Dendropsophus shiwiarum Ortega-Andrade and Ron, 2013

Species of frog

Dendropsophus shiwiarum is a frog in the family Hylidae. It is endemic to Ecuador and Colombia. Scientists think it may also live in nearby parts of Peru.

The adult male frog measures 16.1 to 18.8 mm in snout-vent length and the adult female frog 18.2 to 18.8 mm. On the back, its skin is light brown or yellow with tiny red spots. The skin on the ventrum is whitish.

This frog lays eggs whenever the weather is wet enough, in temporary bodies of water. The males sing for females in small groups.

The name "shiwarum" comes from the Shiwiar people who live in some of the same parts of the Amazon Basin as the frog. They helped herpetologists find the frog and so they could formally describe it.
