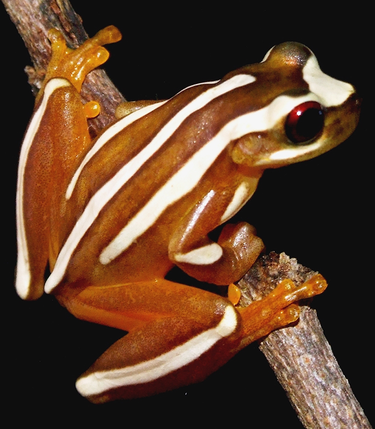

Scientific classification
- Kingdom: Animalia
- Phylum: Chordata
- Class: Amphibia
- Order: Anura
- Family: Hylidae
- Genus: Dendropsophus
- Species: D. nekronastes

Binomial name
- Dendropsophus nekronastes Dias, Haddad, Argôlo and Orrico, 2017

= Dendropsophus nekronastes =

Species of frog

Dendropsophus nekronastes is a frog in the family Hylidae. It is endemic to South America. Scientists know it solely from its type locality in Bahia, Brazil, 303 meters above sea level.

The adult frogs examined by the scientists measured 24.1 to 28.9 mm in snout-vent length and the females measured 31.8 to 35.4 mm. The frog is brown in color with dramatic white or yellow stripes on its head and back. This frog changes color over the course of the day, becoming paler at night.

Scientists found the frog in bodies of water in habitats that humans beings had altered or disturbed, such as cacao plantations and pastures. Scientists named this frog nekronastes, which is Greek for "death-dweller," because it has been found in cemeteries.

Scientists place this species in the same group as Dendropsophus leucophyllatus.
