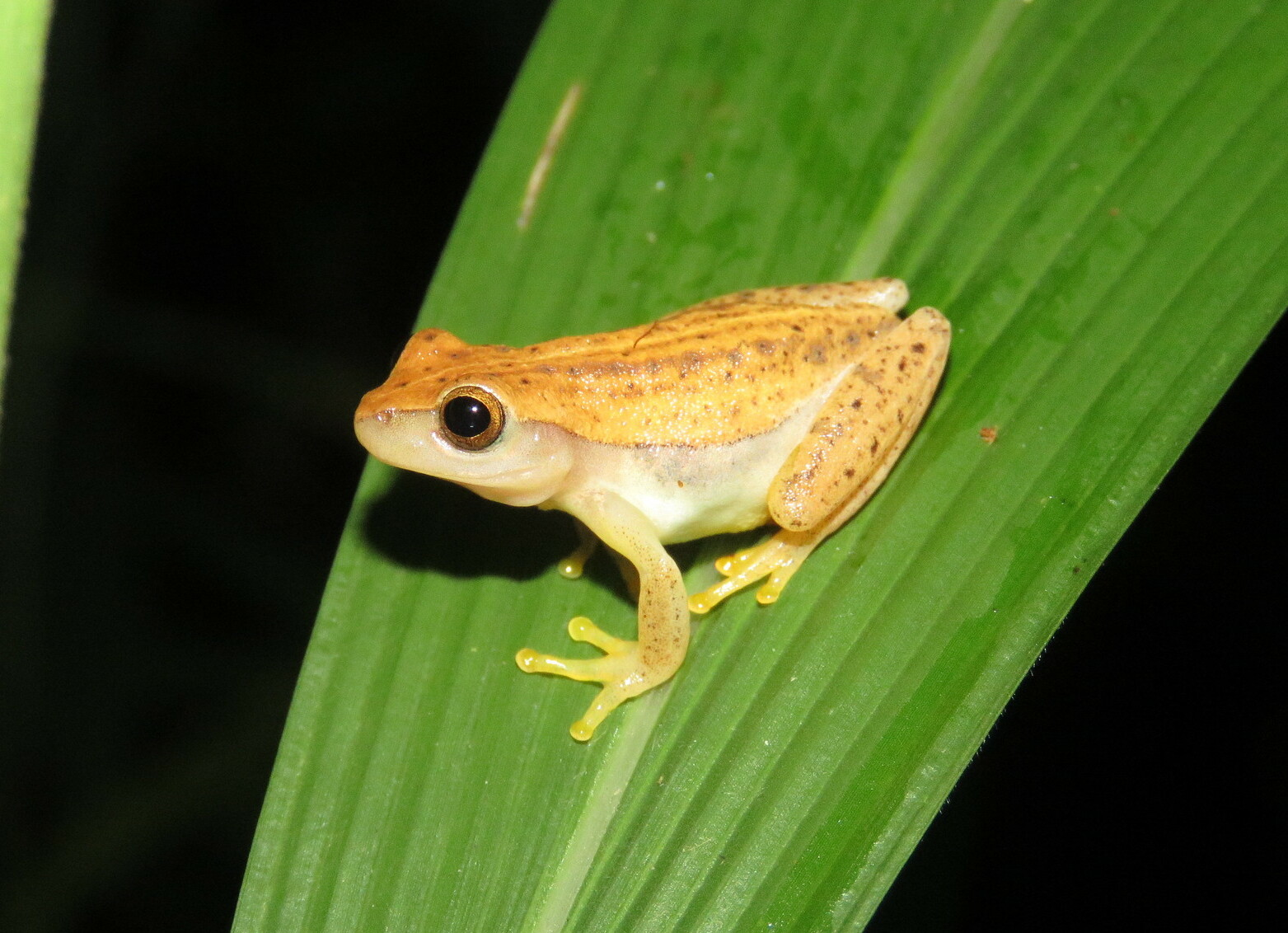

Conservation status
- Least Concern (IUCN 3.1)

Scientific classification
- Kingdom: Animalia
- Phylum: Chordata
- Class: Amphibia
- Order: Anura
- Family: Hylidae
- Genus: Dendropsophus
- Species: D. walfordi

Binomial name
- Dendropsophus walfordi (Bokermann, 1962)

= Dendropsophus walfordi =

Species of frog

Dendropsophus walfordi is a species of frog in the family Hylidae. It is found in Brazil and possibly Bolivia. Its natural habitats are subtropical or tropical moist lowland forests, dry savanna, moist savanna, rivers, intermittent freshwater marshes, pastureland, rural gardens, urban areas, heavily degraded former forest, ponds, and canals and ditches.

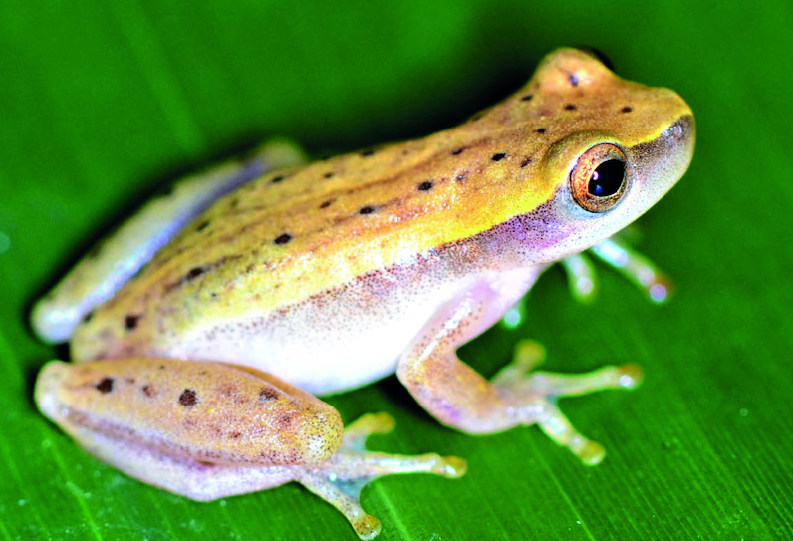
Amapá, Brazil
