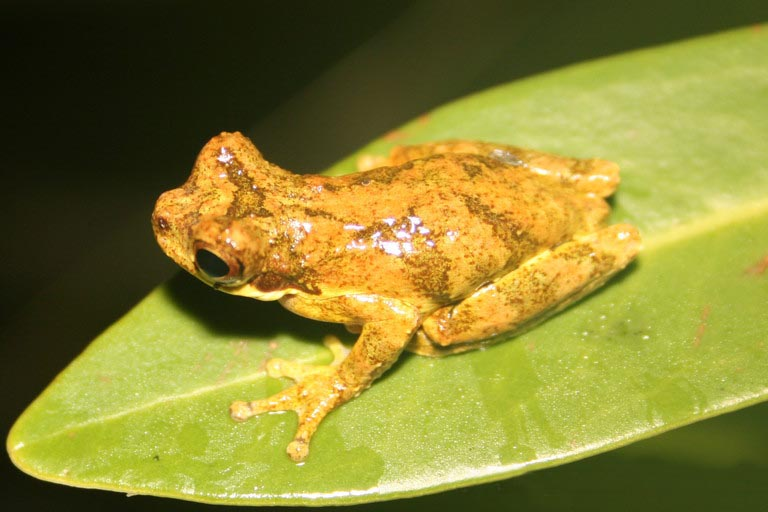
- Dendropsophus microps in Serra da Bocaina National Park, São Paulo, Brazil

Conservation status
- Least Concern (IUCN 3.1)

Scientific classification
- Kingdom: Animalia
- Phylum: Chordata
- Class: Amphibia
- Order: Anura
- Family: Hylidae
- Genus: Dendropsophus
- Species: D. microps

Binomial name
- Dendropsophus microps (Peters, 1872)

= Dendropsophus microps =

Nova Friburgo tree frog

Species of frog

Dendropsophus microps or the Nova Friburgo tree frog, is a species of frog in the family Hylidae. It is believed to be endemic to the Atlantic Forest of southern Brazil, but may occur in Argentina as well.

Its natural habitats are subtropical or tropical moist lowland forests, subtropical or tropical moist montane forests, subtropical or tropical moist shrubland, intermittent freshwater marshes, plantations, heavily degraded former forest, ponds, and canals and ditches. It is threatened by habitat loss.
