= Dendropsophus anataliasiasi =

Conservation status
- Least Concern (IUCN 3.1)

Scientific classification
- Kingdom: Animalia
- Phylum: Chordata
- Class: Amphibia
- Order: Anura
- Family: Hylidae
- Genus: Dendropsophus
- Species: D. anataliasiasi

Binomial name
- Dendropsophus anataliasiasi (Bokermann, 1972)

Species of frog

Dendropsophus anataliasiasi is a species of frog in the family Hylidae. It is endemic to Brazil. Its natural habitats are moist savanna, subtropical or tropical moist shrubland, freshwater marshes, pastureland, rural gardens, and ponds. It is threatened by habitat loss.
