= Dendropsophus gaucheri =

Conservation status
- Least Concern (IUCN 3.1)

Scientific classification
- Kingdom: Animalia
- Phylum: Chordata
- Class: Amphibia
- Order: Anura
- Family: Hylidae
- Genus: Dendropsophus
- Species: D. gaucheri

Binomial name
- Dendropsophus gaucheri (Lescure & Marty, 2001)

Species of amphibian

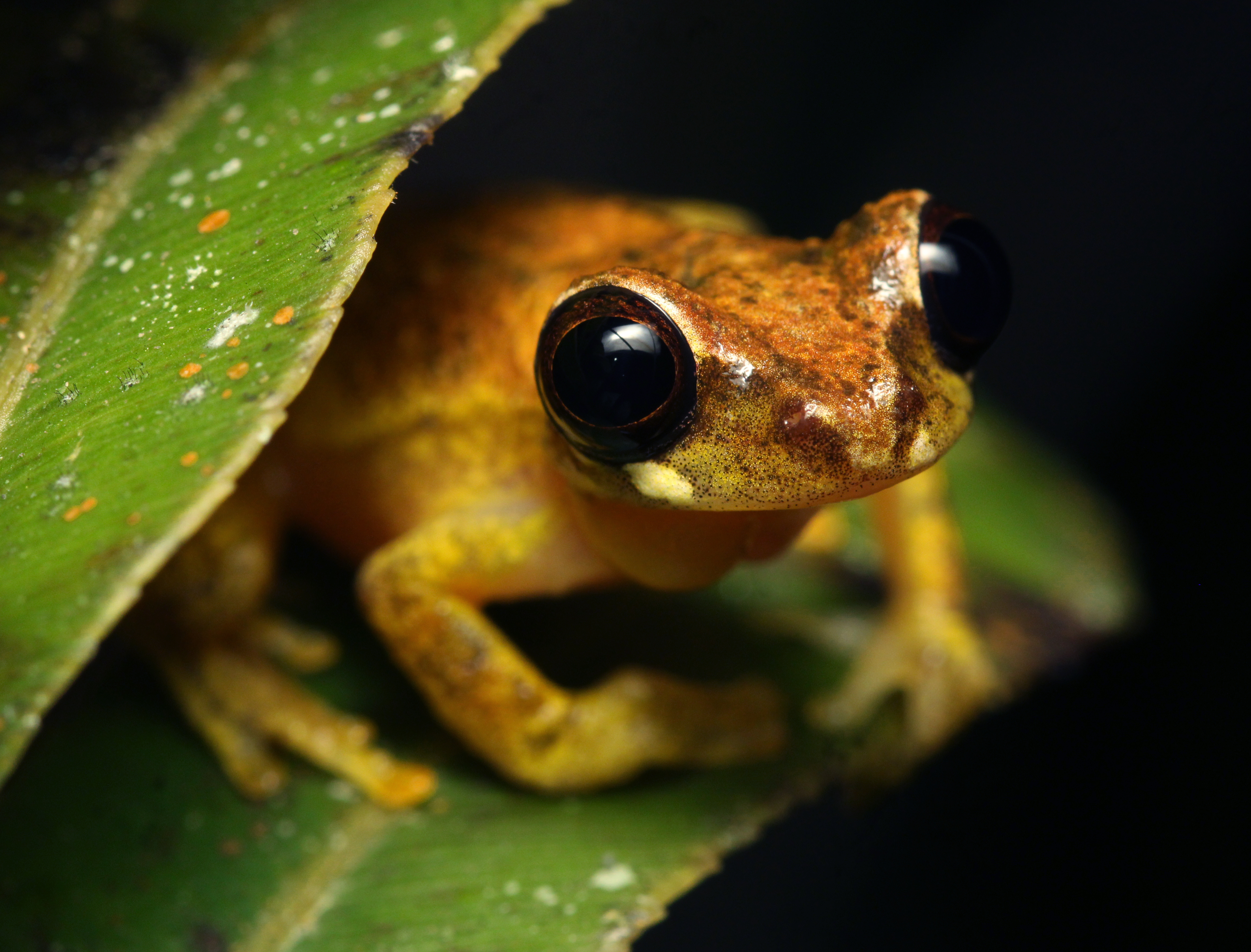
Dendropsophus gaucheri

Dendropsophus gaucheri is a species of frogs in the family Hylidae.

It is found in French Guiana and Suriname. Its natural habitat is savanna near pools that are created during the rainy season. It is a common species during the breeding season.
