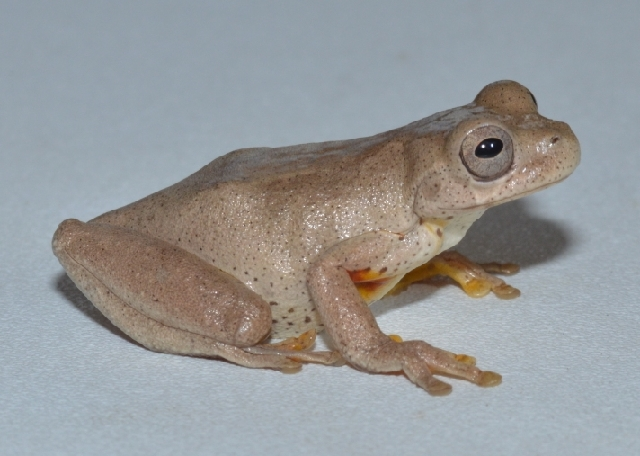

Conservation status
- Least Concern (IUCN 3.1)

Scientific classification
- Kingdom: Animalia
- Phylum: Chordata
- Class: Amphibia
- Order: Anura
- Family: Hylidae
- Genus: Dendropsophus
- Species: D. norandinus

Binomial name
- Dendropsophus norandinus Rivera-Correa and Gutiérrez-Cárdenas, 2012

= Dendropsophus norandinus =

Species of frog

Dendropsophus norandinus, the North Andean tree frog, is a frog endemic to Colombia. Scientists have seen it in exactly three type localities, all between 1420 and 1950 meters above sea level.

== Invasive species ==
Scientists report an increasing volume of exotic species reaching Europe's shores, arriving through the global plant trade. In one instance, the arrival of an exotic South American frog inspired a research paper by a zoologist from the University of Cambridge, entitled Understanding the environmental and social risks from the international trade in ornamental plants.
