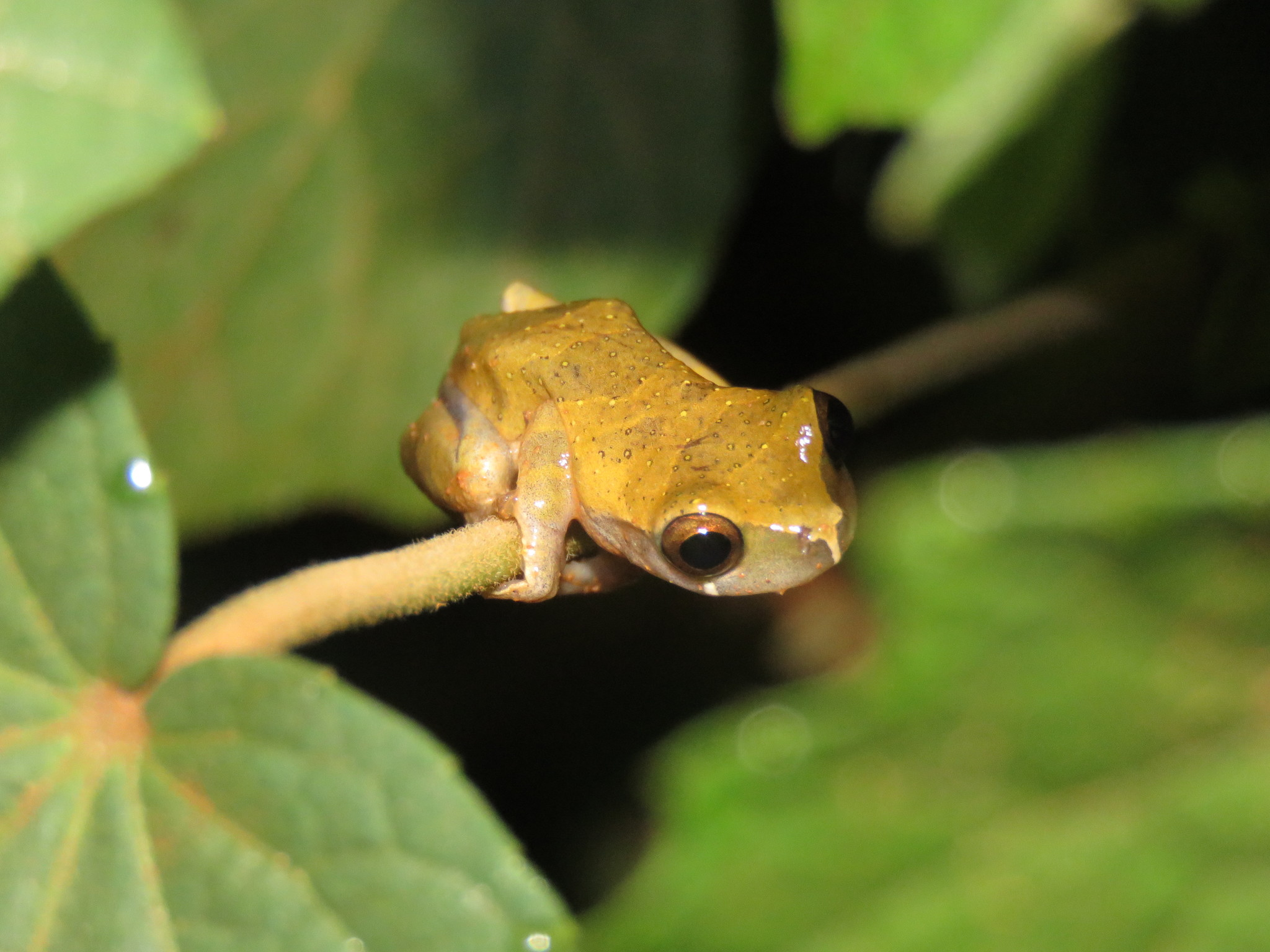

Conservation status
- Least Concern (IUCN 3.1)

Scientific classification
- Kingdom: Animalia
- Phylum: Chordata
- Class: Amphibia
- Order: Anura
- Family: Hylidae
- Genus: Dendropsophus
- Species: D. pauiniensis

Binomial name
- Dendropsophus pauiniensis (Heyer, 1977)

= Dendropsophus pauiniensis =

Species of frog

Dendropsophus pauiniensis is a species of frog in the family Hylidae. It is found in Brazil and possibly Bolivia. Its natural habitats are subtropical or tropical moist lowland forests and rivers.
