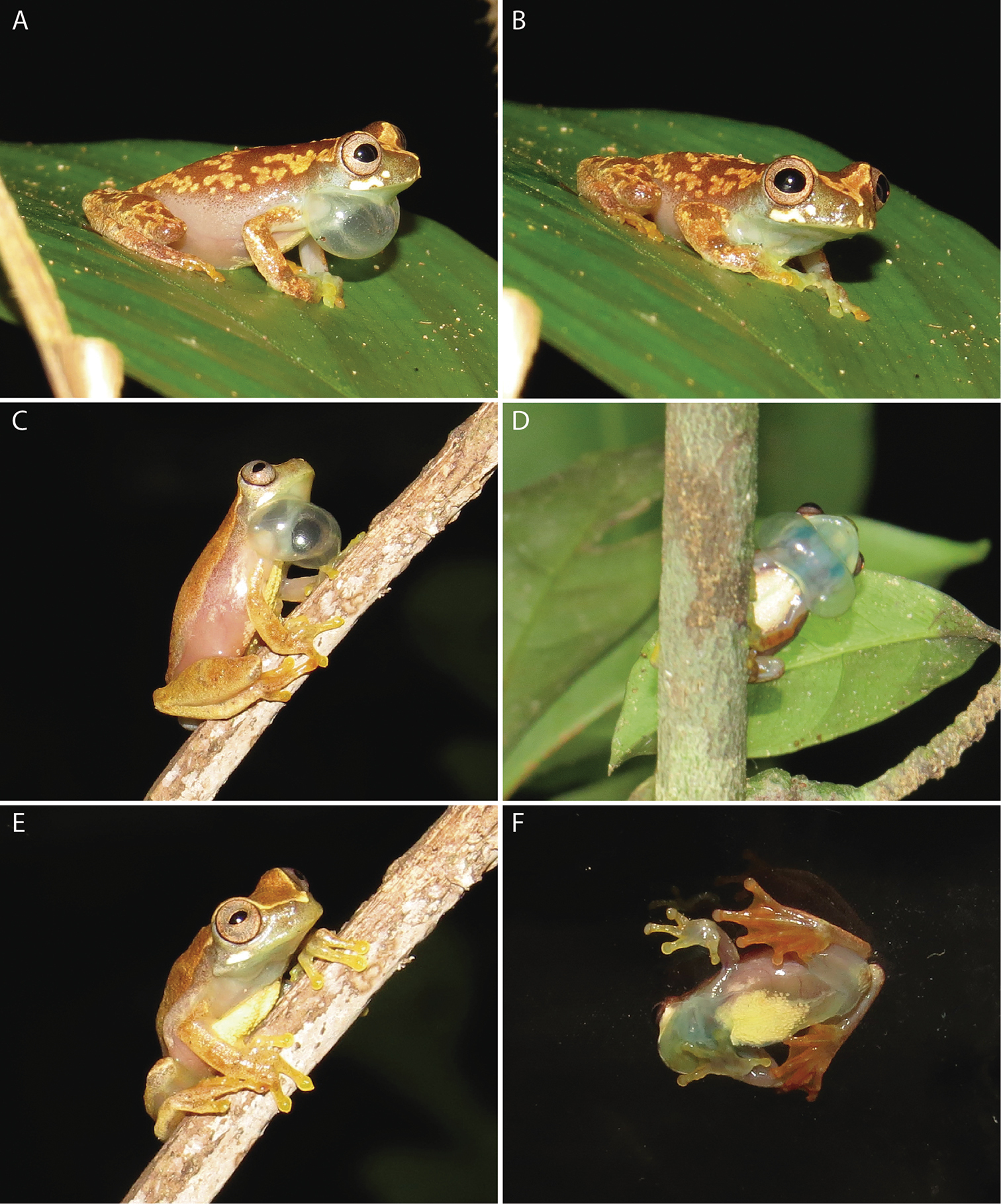
- Note the bilobate (two lobed) vocal sac in figures A, C, and D that the species was named after.

Scientific classification
- Kingdom: Animalia
- Phylum: Chordata
- Class: Amphibia
- Order: Anura
- Family: Hylidae
- Genus: Dendropsophus
- Species: D. bilobatus

Binomial name
- Dendropsophus bilobatus (Ferrão, Moravec, Hanken & Lima, 2020)

= Dendropsophus bilobatus =

Species of amphibian

Dendropsophus bilobatus is a species of tree frog in the Hylidae family found on the east bank of the upper Madeira River, Brazil and possibly the surrounding Bolivian forests. This frog is differentiated from related species by its green bilobate (two lobed) vocal sac and call that consists of one to four monophasic notes at a dominant frequency of 8,979–9,606 Hz. It is a small frog, with males reaching only 18.8 to 20.8 mm (0.74 to 0.82 in) SVL. They breed during the rainy season from November to March in flooded areas near rivers. The males start calling at twilight in branches around two meters above the ground or lower.
