= Dendropsophus grandisonae =

Conservation status
- Data Deficient (IUCN 3.1)

Scientific classification
- Kingdom: Animalia
- Phylum: Chordata
- Class: Amphibia
- Order: Anura
- Family: Hylidae
- Genus: Dendropsophus
- Species: D. grandisonae

Binomial name
- Dendropsophus grandisonae (Goin, 1966)

Synonyms
- Hyla grandisonae Goin, 1966

Species of frog

Dendropsophus grandisonae is a species of frog in the family Hylidae. It is endemic to Guyana. Its natural habitats are subtropical or tropical moist lowland forests, rivers, freshwater marshes, and intermittent freshwater marshes.
