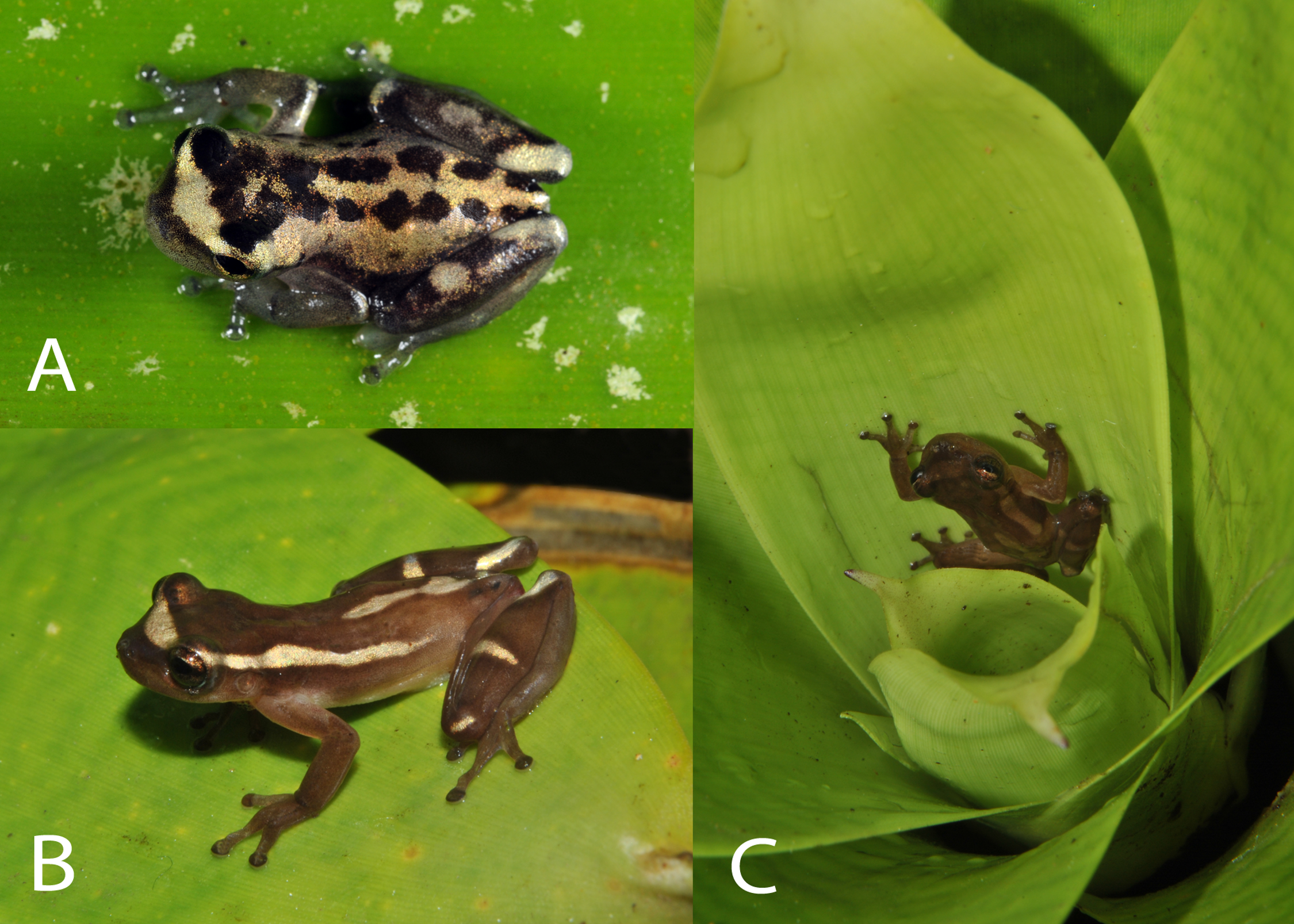

Scientific classification
- Kingdom: Animalia
- Phylum: Chordata
- Class: Amphibia
- Order: Anura
- Family: Hylidae
- Genus: Dendropsophus
- Species: D. bromeliaceus

Binomial name
- Dendropsophus bromeliaceus Ferreira, Faivovich, Beard, and Pombal, 2015

= Dendropsophus bromeliaceus =

Species of frog

Dendropsophus bromeliaceus, or Teresensis' bromeliad frog, is a frog in the family Hylidae, endemic to Brazil. Scientists have only seen it in the mountains in the Reserva Biológica Augusto Ruschi.\

The adult male frog measures 16.1–18.4 mm long in snout-vent length. The skin of the dorsum is light brown in color with a wide, cream-colored dorsolateral stretching from behind the eye to the inguinal region. There is another stripe in the middle of the back. There is a triangular mark on the face. The hind legs are cream in color and the front legs and belly are gray. The iris of the eye is black in color.

This is the only frog in Dendropsophus whose tadpole swims in rainwater. Instead of laying eggs in a stream or pond, the female finds a place where rainwater has collected in the leaves of bromeliad plants.

Scientists think this frog might be territorial and that male frogs might be involved in tadpole care.

Scientists named this frog Teresensis referring to the demonym for a person born in the municipality of Santa Teresa. They gave it the scientific name bromeliaceus' after the bromeliad plants where it lays its eggs.
