= Dendropsophus battersbyi =

Conservation status
- Data Deficient (IUCN 3.1)

Scientific classification
- Kingdom: Animalia
- Phylum: Chordata
- Class: Amphibia
- Order: Anura
- Family: Hylidae
- Genus: Dendropsophus
- Species: D. battersbyi

Binomial name
- Dendropsophus battersbyi (Rivero, 1961)

Species of frog

Dendropsophus battersbyi is a species of frog in the family Hylidae. It is endemic to Venezuela. Its natural habitats are subtropical or tropical moist lowland forests and rivers. It is threatened by habitat loss.
