= Dendropsophus juliani =

Conservation status
- Least Concern (IUCN 3.1)

Scientific classification
- Kingdom: Animalia
- Phylum: Chordata
- Class: Amphibia
- Order: Anura
- Family: Hylidae
- Genus: Dendropsophus
- Species: D. juliani

Binomial name
- Dendropsophus juliani Moravec, Aparicio & Köhler, 2006

Species of amphibian

Dendropsophus juliani is a species of frogs in the family Hylidae. It is endemic to northern Bolivia.
