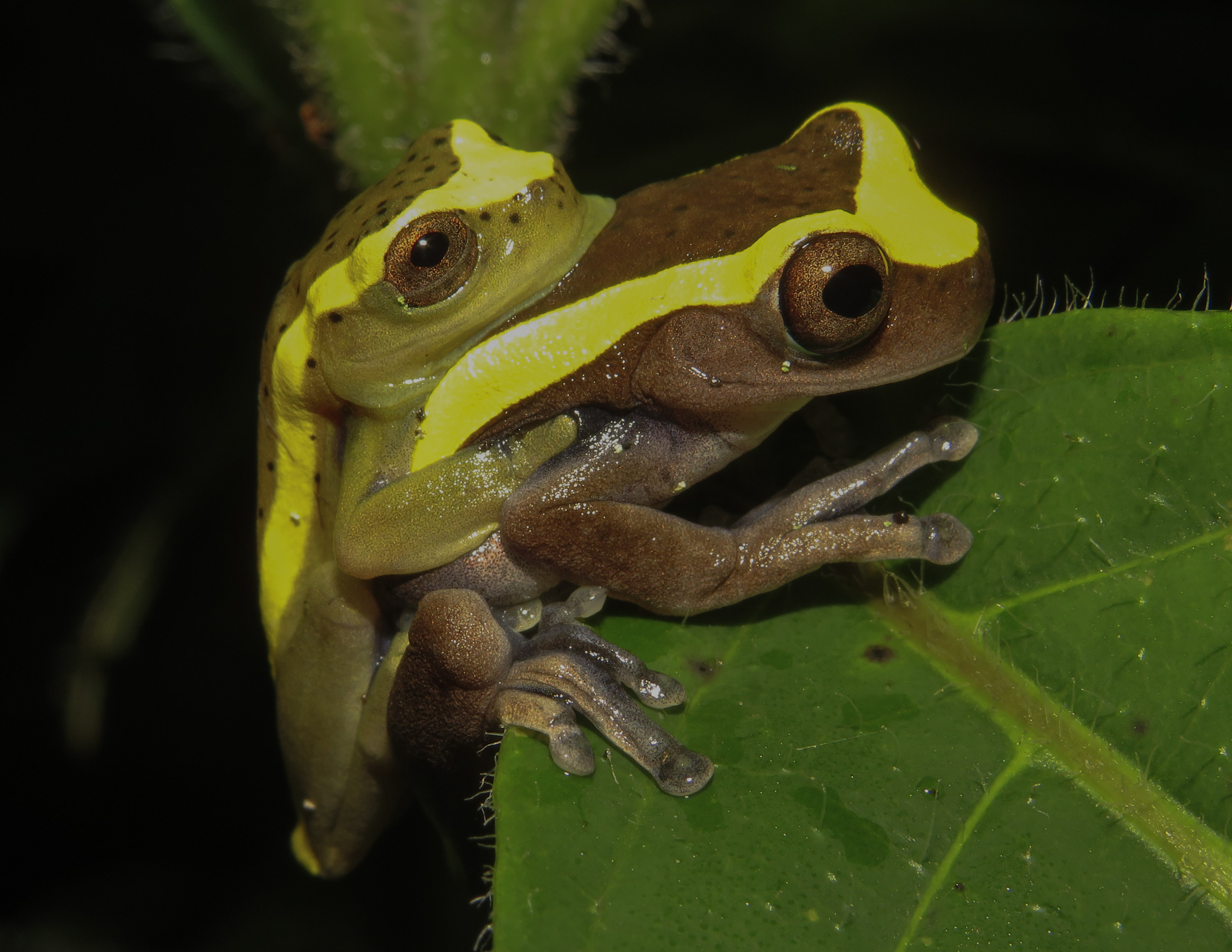

Conservation status
- Least Concern (IUCN 3.1)

Scientific classification
- Kingdom: Animalia
- Phylum: Chordata
- Class: Amphibia
- Order: Anura
- Family: Hylidae
- Genus: Dendropsophus
- Species: D. manonegra

Binomial name
- Dendropsophus manonegra Rivera-Correa and Orrico, 2013

= Dendropsophus manonegra =

Species of frog

Dendropsophus manonegra is a frog in the family Hylidae. It is endemic to Colombia. Scientists have seen it between 400 and 1200 meters above sea level.
