= Dendropsophus rozenmani =

Scientific classification
- Kingdom: Animalia
- Phylum: Chordata
- Class: Amphibia
- Order: Anura
- Family: Hylidae
- Genus: Dendropsophus
- Species: D. rozenmani

Binomial name
- Dendropsophus rozenmani Jansen, Santana, Teixeira, and Köhler, 2019

Species of frog

Dendropsophus rozenmani is a frog in the family Hylidae endemic to Bolivia.

This frog lives in temporary and permanent bodies of water and in flooded savannas.

The adult male frog measures 18.7–21.1 mm in snout-vent length and the adult female frog 19.6–23.2 mm. The skin of the dorsum is brown in color with two dark brown stripes in parallel.
