= Dendropsophus frosti =

Conservation status
- Least Concern (IUCN 3.1)

Scientific classification
- Kingdom: Animalia
- Phylum: Chordata
- Class: Amphibia
- Order: Anura
- Family: Hylidae
- Genus: Dendropsophus
- Species: D. frosti

Binomial name
- Dendropsophus frosti Motta, Castroviejo-Fisher, Venegas, Orrico, and Padial, 2012

Species of amphibian

Dendropsophus frosti, the acre tree frog, is a frog in the family Hylidae. It is endemic to in South America. Scientists have seen it at two sites, one in Colombia and one in Peru.

The adult male frog measures 21.1 to 23.0 mm long in snout-vent length and the adult female frog 25.9 to 28.8 mm. It has large eyes and vomerine teeth in its jaw. During the day, this frog is light brown in color on the dorsum with darker coloration on the sides and groin. Its belly is yellow or white. At night, the male frog is yellow and the female frog is brown.

The female frog lays eggs on firm surfaces, such as the sides of tree trunks.

This species is named after herpetologist Darrel Frost.
