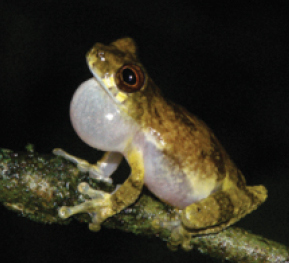

Scientific classification
- Kingdom: Animalia
- Phylum: Chordata
- Class: Amphibia
- Order: Anura
- Family: Hylidae
- Genus: Dendropsophus
- Species: D. counani

Binomial name
- Dendropsophus counani Fouquet, Orrico, Ernst, Blanc, Martinez, Vacher, Rodrigues, Ouboter, Jairam, and Ron, 2015

= Dendropsophus counani =

Species of frog

Dendropsophus counani is a frog in the family Hylidae. It is endemic to Brazil, French Guiana, Suriname, and Guyana.

The adult male frog measures 19.6 to 21.7 mm in snout-vent length the while the adult female frog measures 22.1 to 24.5 mm. The tops of the thighs are dark grey with cream blotches and no yellow patches or stripes.
