= Dendropsophus sartori =

Conservation status
- Least Concern (IUCN 3.1)

Scientific classification
- Kingdom: Animalia
- Phylum: Chordata
- Class: Amphibia
- Order: Anura
- Family: Hylidae
- Genus: Dendropsophus
- Species: D. sartori

Binomial name
- Dendropsophus sartori (Smith, 1951)

Synonyms
- Hyla microcephala sartori Smith, 1951; Hyla sartori Smith, 1951

Species of frog

Dendropsophus sartori (common name: Taylor's yellow treefrog) is a species of frog in the family Hylidae. It is endemic to Mexico and occurs on the Pacific slopes of southwestern Mexico in Jalisco, Guerrero, and Oaxaca. Its natural habitats are lowland dry tropical forests. It breeds during the rainy season when it is commonly found in temporary ponds. It is a common species but its habitat is being lost.
