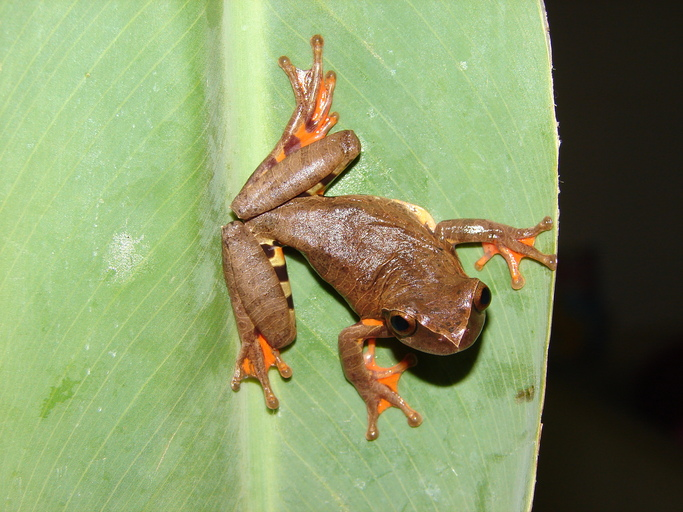

Conservation status
- Least Concern (IUCN 3.1)

Scientific classification
- Kingdom: Animalia
- Phylum: Chordata
- Class: Amphibia
- Order: Anura
- Family: Hylidae
- Genus: Dendropsophus
- Species: D. anceps

Binomial name
- Dendropsophus anceps (Lutz, 1929)

Synonyms
- Hyla anceps Lutz, 1929

= Dendropsophus anceps =

Species of frog

Dendropsophus anceps (common name: Estrella treefrog) is a species of frog in the family Hylidae. It is endemic to the lowlands of southeastern Brazil. Its natural habitats are open, stagnant water bodies (swamps), including man-made pools. There are no significant threats to this very common species.
