= Dendropsophus reticulatus =

Scientific classification
- Kingdom: Animalia
- Phylum: Chordata
- Class: Amphibia
- Order: Anura
- Family: Hylidae
- Genus: Dendropsophus
- Species: D. reticulatus

Binomial name
- Dendropsophus reticulatus (Jiménez de la Espada, 1870)

Synonyms
- Hyla reticulata (Jiménez de la Espada, 1870); Hyla reticulata (Boulenger, 1882); Hyla membranacea (Andersson, 1945); Hyla laynei (Goin, 1957); Dendropsophus reticulatus (Caminer, Milá, Jansen, Fouquet, Venegas, Chávez, Lougheed, and Ron, 2017)

Species of amphibian

The reticulated tree frog (Dendropsophus reticulatus) is a species of frog in the family Hylidae. It lives in Bolivia, Peru, Ecuador and Colombia. It has been reported between 40 and 1037 meters above sea level.

Male adults measure 2.0 to 2.9 cm long while female adults are 2.8 to 4.0 cm. Males sing for females near temporary or permanent bodies of water. D. reticulatus eggs are laid all year on the top of leaves about 30 cm over the water. When the tadpoles hatch, they fall into the water.
