= Dendropsophus coffeus =

Conservation status
- Least Concern (IUCN 3.1)

Scientific classification
- Kingdom: Animalia
- Phylum: Chordata
- Class: Amphibia
- Order: Anura
- Family: Hylidae
- Genus: Dendropsophus
- Species: D. coffeus

Binomial name
- Dendropsophus coffeus (Köhler, Jungfer & Reichle, 2005)

Species of amphibian

Dendropsophus coffeus is a species of frogs in the family Hylidae.

It is found in Bolivia and possibly Peru. Its natural habitats are subtropical or tropical moist lowland forests and freshwater marshes. It is threatened by habitat loss.
