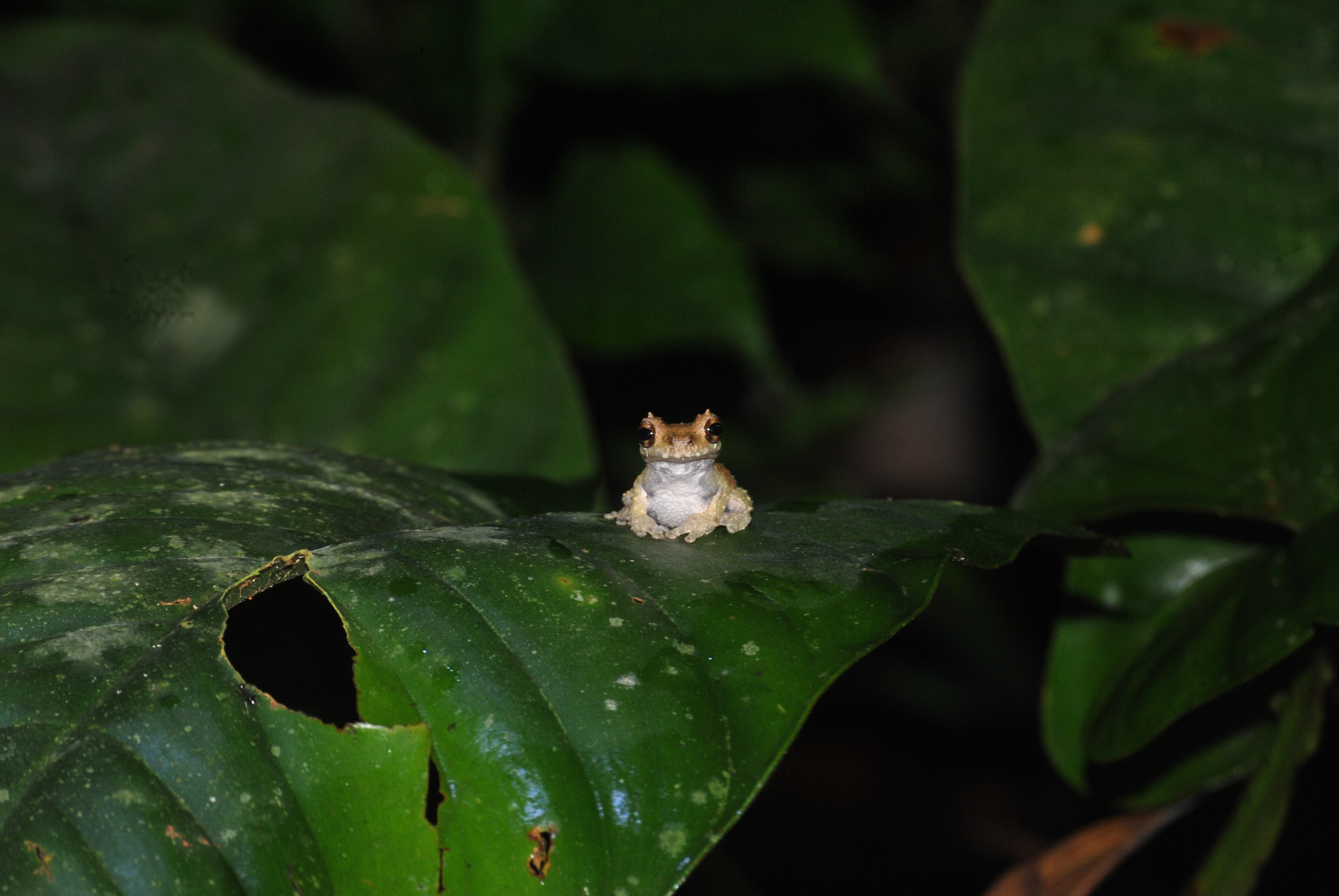

Conservation status
- Least Concern (IUCN 3.1)

Scientific classification
- Kingdom: Animalia
- Phylum: Chordata
- Class: Amphibia
- Order: Anura
- Family: Hylidae
- Genus: Dendropsophus
- Species: D. kamagarini

Binomial name
- Dendropsophus kamagarini (Rivadeneira, Venegas, and Ron, 2018)

Synonyms
- Dendropsophus kamagarini (Rivadeneira, Venegas, and Ron, 2018)

= Dendropsophus kamagarini =

Species of amphibian

Dendropsophus kamagarini is a frog in the family Hylidae. It is endemic to Bolivia, Peru and Brazil. Scientists have seen it between 150 and 1696 meters above sea level.
