= Dendropsophus praestans =

Conservation status
- Least Concern (IUCN 3.1)

Scientific classification
- Kingdom: Animalia
- Phylum: Chordata
- Class: Amphibia
- Order: Anura
- Family: Hylidae
- Genus: Dendropsophus
- Species: D. praestans

Binomial name
- Dendropsophus praestans (Duellman & Trueb, 1983)

Species of frog

Dendropsophus praestans is a species of frog in the family Hylidae. It is endemic to Colombia. Its natural habitats are subtropical or tropical moist montane forests, freshwater marshes, intermittent freshwater marshes, arable land, pastureland, plantations, rural gardens, heavily degraded former forest, and ponds.
