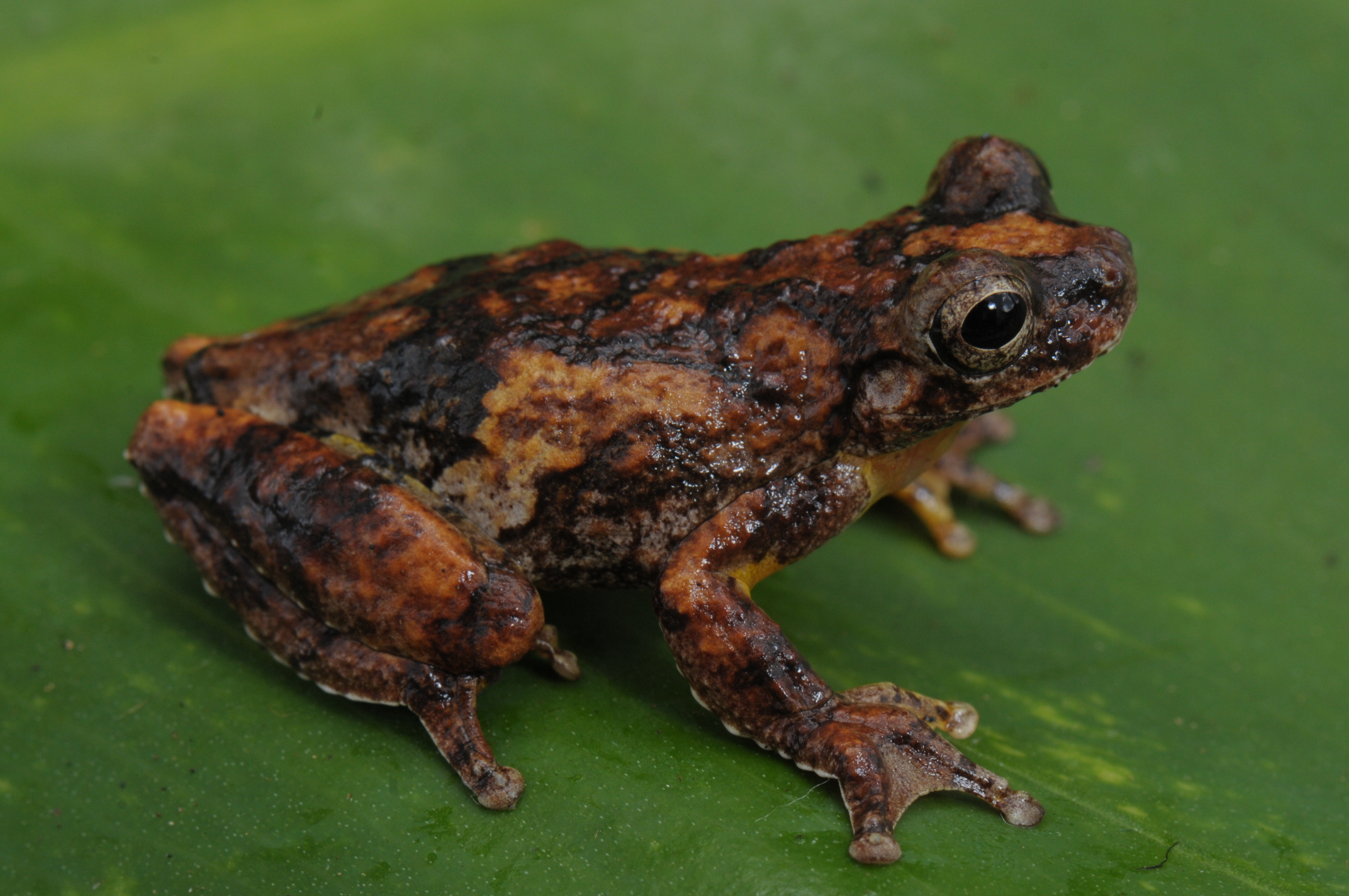

Conservation status
- Least Concern (IUCN 3.1)

Scientific classification
- Kingdom: Animalia
- Phylum: Chordata
- Class: Amphibia
- Order: Anura
- Family: Hylidae
- Genus: Dendropsophus
- Species: D. seniculus

Binomial name
- Dendropsophus seniculus (Cope, 1868)

= Dendropsophus seniculus =

Species of frog

Dendropsophus seniculus is a species of frog in the family Hylidae. It is endemic to Brazil. Its natural habitats are subtropical or tropical moist lowland forests, swamps, freshwater marshes, intermittent freshwater marshes, and rural gardens. It is threatened by habitat loss.
