= Dendropsophus pelidna =

Conservation status
- Near Threatened (IUCN 3.1)

Scientific classification
- Kingdom: Animalia
- Phylum: Chordata
- Class: Amphibia
- Order: Anura
- Family: Hylidae
- Genus: Dendropsophus
- Species: D. pelidna

Binomial name
- Dendropsophus pelidna (Duellman, 1989)

Species of frog

Dendropsophus pelidna is a species of frog in the family Hylidae. It is found in Colombia and Venezuela. Its natural habitats are subtropical or tropical moist montane forests, subtropical or tropical high-altitude shrubland, freshwater marshes, intermittent freshwater marshes, plantations, rural gardens, heavily degraded former forest, and ponds.
