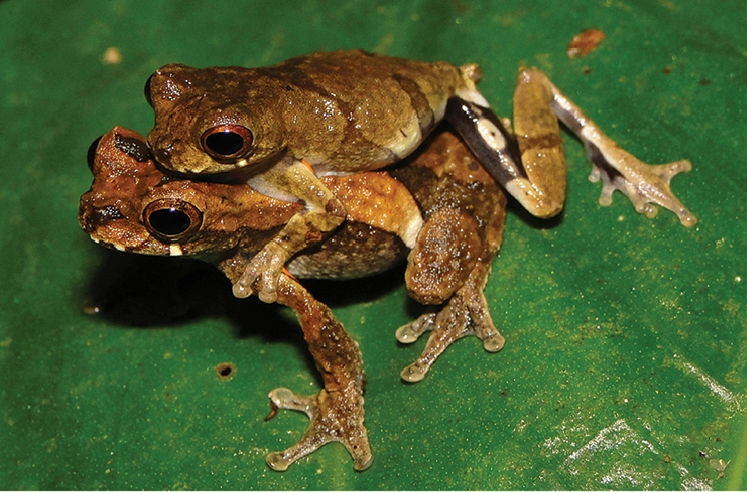

Conservation status
- Least Concern (IUCN 3.1)

Scientific classification
- Kingdom: Animalia
- Phylum: Chordata
- Class: Amphibia
- Order: Anura
- Family: Hylidae
- Genus: Dendropsophus
- Species: D. kubricki

Binomial name
- Dendropsophus kubricki Rivadeneira, Venegas, and Ron, 2018

= Dendropsophus kubricki =

Species of frog

Dendropsophus kubricki is a frog in the family Hylidae. It is endemic to Peru. Scientists have seen it between 106 and 725 meters above sea level.

The adult male frog measures about 22.73 mm in snout-vent length and the adult female frog about 28.39 mm. There is a bright orange spot under each limb. The skin of the dorsum is brown, red-brown, or gray-brown in color with some darker brown marks. The venter is black in color and some individuals have white spots. The iris is red-brown, brown, or silver-gray in color.

This frog lives in the Amazon Basin, where it has been observed in both terra firma and flooded rainforests. The female frog lays her eggs directly in temporary bodies of water.

Scientists classify this frog as of least concern of extinction because of its large range. Humans may pose some threat through habitat alteration associated with cattle farming and oil exploitation.

Scientists named this frog after filmmaker Stanley Kubrick.
