= Dendropsophus limai =

Conservation status
- Data Deficient (IUCN 3.1)

Scientific classification
- Kingdom: Animalia
- Phylum: Chordata
- Class: Amphibia
- Order: Anura
- Family: Hylidae
- Genus: Dendropsophus
- Species: D. limai

Binomial name
- Dendropsophus limai (Bokermann, 1962)

Species of frog

Dendropsophus limai is a species of frog in the family Hylidae. It is endemic to Brazil. Its natural habitats are subtropical or tropical moist lowland forests, freshwater marshes, and intermittent freshwater marshes.
