= Dendropsophus cerradensis =

Conservation status
- Data Deficient (IUCN 3.1)

Scientific classification
- Kingdom: Animalia
- Phylum: Chordata
- Class: Amphibia
- Order: Anura
- Family: Hylidae
- Genus: Dendropsophus
- Species: D. cerradensis

Binomial name
- Dendropsophus cerradensis (Napoli & Caramaschi, 1998)

Species of amphibian

Dendropsophus cerradensis is a species of frogs in the family Hylidae.

It is endemic to Brazil. Its natural habitats are moist savanna, subtropical or tropical moist shrubland, freshwater marshes, and intermittent freshwater marshes. It is threatened by habitat loss.
