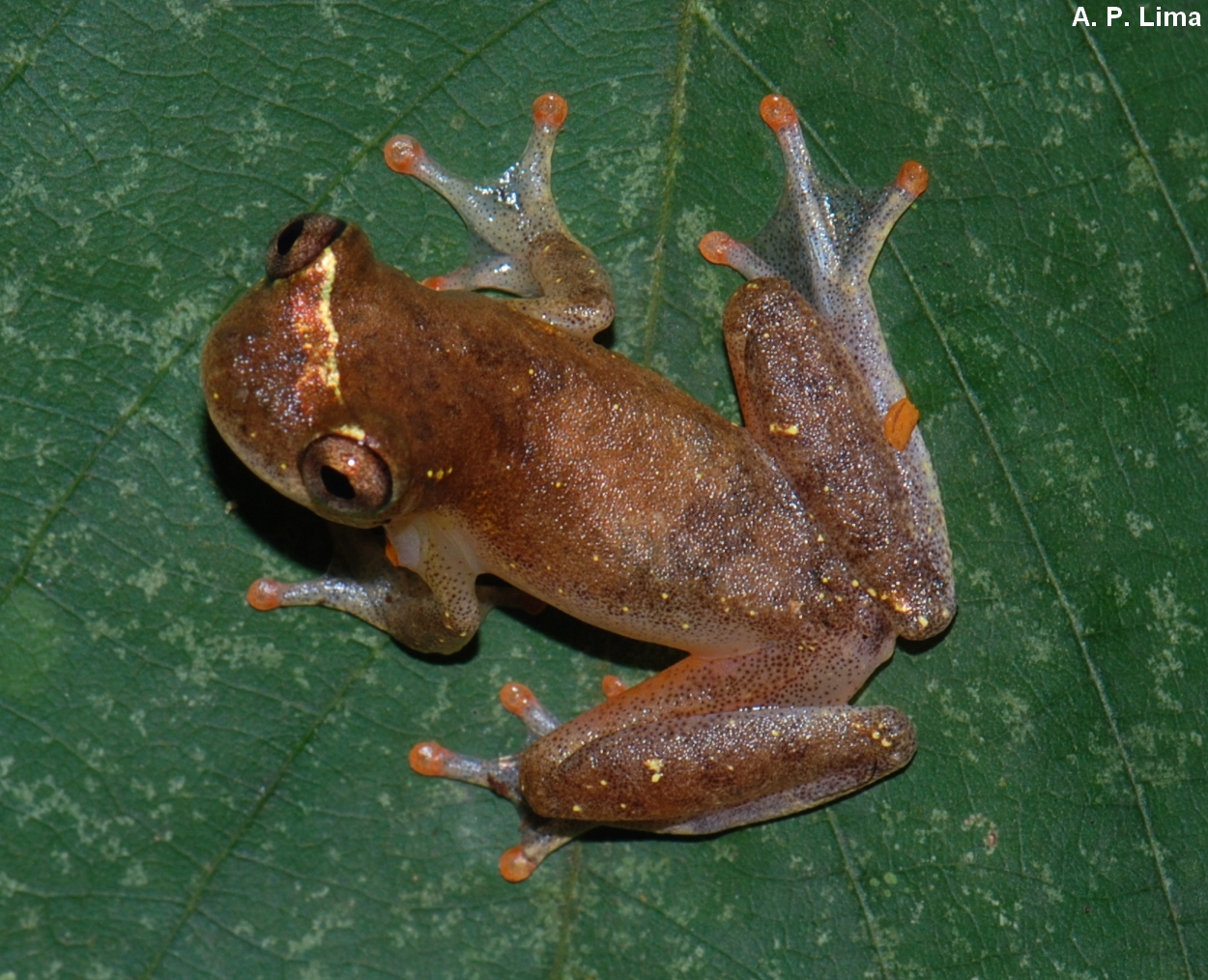

Conservation status
- Least Concern (IUCN 3.1)

Scientific classification
- Kingdom: Animalia
- Phylum: Chordata
- Class: Amphibia
- Order: Anura
- Family: Hylidae
- Genus: Dendropsophus
- Species: D. rossalleni

Binomial name
- Dendropsophus rossalleni (Goin, 1959)

Synonyms
- Hyla alleni Goin, 1957

= Dendropsophus rossalleni =

Species of frog

Dendropsophus rossalleni is a species of frog in the family Hylidae. It is found in Brazil, Colombia, Ecuador, Peru, and possibly Bolivia. Its natural habitats are subtropical or tropical moist lowland forests and intermittent freshwater marshes.
