= Dendropsophus xapuriensis =

Conservation status
- Least Concern (IUCN 3.1)

Scientific classification
- Kingdom: Animalia
- Phylum: Chordata
- Class: Amphibia
- Order: Anura
- Family: Hylidae
- Genus: Dendropsophus
- Species: D. xapuriensis

Binomial name
- Dendropsophus xapuriensis (Martins & Cardoso, 1987)

Species of frog

Dendropsophus xapuriensis is a species of frog in the family Hylidae. It is found in Brazil, possibly Bolivia, and possibly Peru. Its natural habitats are subtropical or tropical seasonally wet or flooded lowland grassland, intermittent freshwater marshes, plantations, rural gardens, heavily degraded former forest, and seasonally flooded agricultural land.
