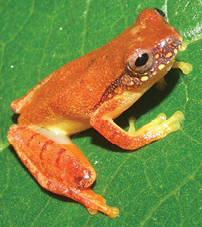

Conservation status
- Least Concern (IUCN 3.1)

Scientific classification
- Kingdom: Animalia
- Phylum: Chordata
- Class: Amphibia
- Order: Anura
- Family: Hylidae
- Genus: Dendropsophus
- Species: D. bipunctatus

Binomial name
- Dendropsophus bipunctatus (Spix, 1824)

= Dendropsophus bipunctatus =

Species of frog

Dendropsophus bipunctatus is a species of frog in the family Hylidae. It is endemic to Brazil. Its natural habitats are subtropical or tropical moist lowland forests, subtropical or tropical moist montane forests, subtropical or tropical moist shrubland, subtropical or tropical seasonally wet or flooded lowland grassland, freshwater marshes, intermittent freshwater marshes, pastureland, and ponds.
