= Dendropsophus meridensis =

Conservation status
- Endangered (IUCN 3.1)

Scientific classification
- Kingdom: Animalia
- Phylum: Chordata
- Class: Amphibia
- Order: Anura
- Family: Hylidae
- Genus: Dendropsophus
- Species: D. meridensis

Binomial name
- Dendropsophus meridensis (Rivero, 1961)

Synonyms
- Hyla vilsoniana ssp. meridensis Rivero, 1961

Species of frog

Dendropsophus meridensis is a species of frog in the family Hylidae. It is endemic to Venezuela. Its natural habitats are subtropical or tropical moist montane forests, freshwater marshes, and intermittent freshwater marshes. It is threatened by habitat loss.
