= Dendropsophus ozzyi =

Scientific classification
- Kingdom: Animalia
- Phylum: Chordata
- Class: Amphibia
- Order: Anura
- Family: Hylidae
- Genus: Dendropsophus
- Species: D. ozzyi

Binomial name
- Dendropsophus ozzyi Orrico, Peloso, Sturaro, Silva, Neckel-Oliveira, Gordo, Faivovich, and Haddad, 2014

Species of amphibian

Dendropsophus ozzyi is a frog in the family Hylidae. It is endemic to in Brazil.

== Initial description ==
- Victor G D Orrico; Pedro L V Peloso; Marcelo J Sturaro; Heriberto F Da Silva-Filho; Selvino Neckel-Oliveira; Marcelo Gordo; Julián Faivovich; Célio F B Haddad (November 6, 2014). "A new "Bat-Voiced" species of Dendropsophus Fitzinger, 1843 (Anura, Hylidae) from the Amazon Basin, Brazil". Zootaxa (Abstract). 3881 (4): 341–61. doi:10.11646/zootaxa.3881.4.3. hdl:11336/20945. PMID 25543640.
