= Boana nigra =

Scientific classification
- Kingdom: Animalia
- Phylum: Chordata
- Class: Amphibia
- Order: Anura
- Family: Hylidae
- Genus: Boana
- Species: B. nigra

Binomial name
- Boana nigra Caminer and Ron, 2020

Species of frog

Boana nigra, the black-flanked tree frog, is a frog in the family Hylidae. It is endemic to Ecuador. Scientists have seen it between 910 and 1847 meters above sea level.

The adult male frog measures 38.5 to 46.3 mm in snout-vent length and the adult female frog 56.4 to 76.7 mm. This frog is brown, reddish brown, or darn brown on the back with darker spots. It has black sides and black stripes. The webs on its feet are either black or bright orange.

This frog's English and scientific names come from the Latin word for "black".

== See also ==
- Boana semilineata
- Boana appendiculata
- Boana geographica
