= Tepui tree frog =

Conservation status
- Least Concern (IUCN 3.1)

Scientific classification
- Kingdom: Animalia
- Phylum: Chordata
- Class: Amphibia
- Order: Anura
- Family: Hylidae
- Genus: Boana
- Species: B. tepuiana

Binomial name
- Boana tepuiana (Barrio-Amorós and Brewer-Carias, 2008)

Synonyms
- Hypsiboas tepuianus Barrio-Amorós and Brewer-Carias, 2008

Species of frog

The tepui tree frog (Boana tepuiana) is a frog in the family Hylidae, endemic to Brazil and Venezuela. Scientists have seen it between 420 and 1800 meters above sea level.

The adult male frog measures 30.0–36.0 mm in snout-vent length and the adult female frog 34.5–47.7 mm. The skin on the frog's dorsum is not granular, but the skin of the ventrum may be. The skin on the dorsum is bright yellow with some brown marks, brown with gray marks, or dark brown with yellow stripes. The toes and webbing between the toes are red-orange in color.

The frog's tongue is wide and round, and it has vomerine teeth in its jaw.

This frog's scientific name, tepuiana, refers to the Tepui Mountains in Venezuela, which are part of its range.

== Original description ==
- Barrio-Amoros CL; Brewer-Carias C (2008). "Herpetological results of the 2002 expedition to Sarisarinama, a tepui in Venezuelan Guyana, with the description of five new species". Zootaxa. 1942: 1–68. doi:10.11646/zootaxa.1942.1.1.
