= Hypsiboas hypselops =

Scientific classification
- Kingdom: Animalia
- Phylum: Chordata
- Class: Amphibia
- Order: Anura
- Superfamily: Hyloidea
- Family: Hylidae
- Genus: Boana?
- Species: "H." hypselops

Binomial name
- "Hypsiboas" hypselops Cope, 1871 "1870"

Synonyms
- Hyla hypselops (Cope, 1871)

Doubtful name for a species of amphibian

Hypsiboas hypselops is a nomen dubium. It was originally given by Edward Drinker Cope in 1871 to specimen(s) collected from Pebas in northeastern Peru. However, Cope did not designate types, and whereabouts of the specimen(s) he used are unknown. Based on George Albert Boulenger's statement that it can be distinguished from Hyla crepitans (=Boana crepitans) by its acuminate snout, larger eye, and anterior femoral bands, the name Hypsiboas hypselops likely refers to some Boana species, but it is not possible to associate it with any particular known species.
