= Boana botumirim =

Scientific classification
- Kingdom: Animalia
- Phylum: Chordata
- Class: Amphibia
- Order: Anura
- Family: Hylidae
- Genus: Boana
- Species: B. botumirim

Binomial name
- Boana botumirim (Caramaschi, Cruz, and Nascimento, 2009)

Synonyms
- Hypsiboas botumirim Caramaschi, Cruz, and Nascimento, 2009

Species of frog

Boana botumirim is a species of frog in the family Hylidae. It is endemic to Brazil. Scientists have only seen it in one place: Veredas de Botumirim in Minas Gerais.
