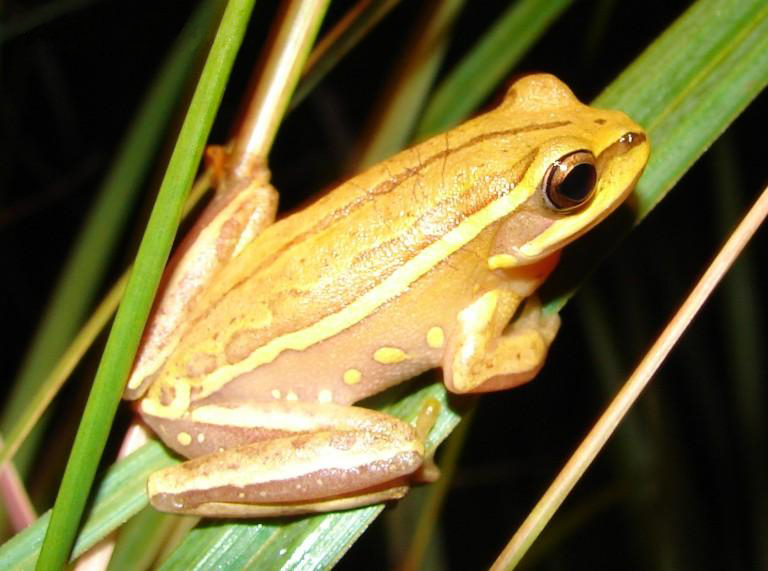

Conservation status
- Least Concern (IUCN 3.1)

Scientific classification
- Kingdom: Animalia
- Phylum: Chordata
- Class: Amphibia
- Order: Anura
- Family: Hylidae
- Genus: Boana
- Species: B. semiguttata

Binomial name
- Boana semiguttata (A. Lutz, 1925)

Synonyms
- Hypsiboas semiguttatus (A. Lutz, 1925)

= Speckled tree frog =

Species of amphibian

The speckled tree frog (Boana semiguttata) is a species of frog in the family Hylidae found in Argentina, Brazil, and possibly Paraguay. Its natural habitats are subtropical or tropical moist lowland forests, rivers, rural gardens, and heavily degraded former forests. It is threatened by habitat loss.
