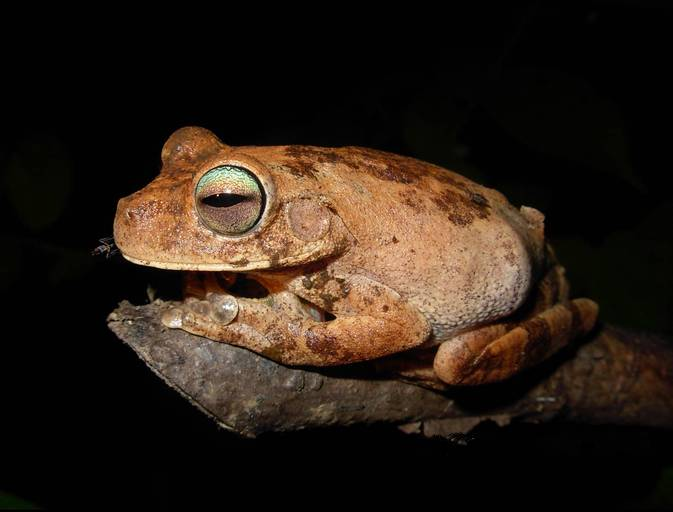

Conservation status
- Least Concern (IUCN 3.1)

Scientific classification
- Kingdom: Animalia
- Phylum: Chordata
- Class: Amphibia
- Order: Anura
- Family: Hylidae
- Genus: Boana
- Species: B. pugnax

Binomial name
- Boana pugnax (Spix, 1824)

Synonyms
- Hyla pugnax (Schmidt, 1857); Hypsiboas pugnax (Cope, 1867); Boana pugnax (Dubois, 2017)

= Boana pugnax =

Species of amphibian

Boana pugnax, the Chirique-Flusse tree frog, is a frog in the family Hylidae. It is endemic to Panama, Colombia, and Venezuela. Scientists have seen it as high as 500 meters above sea level.
