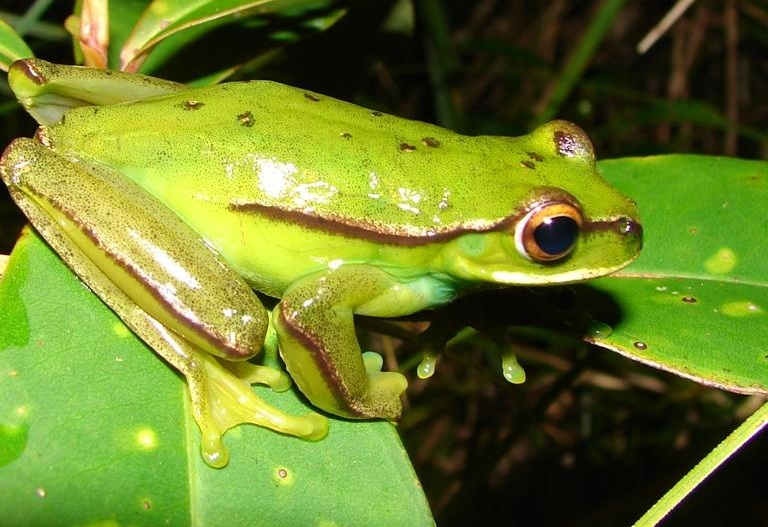

Conservation status
- Least Concern (IUCN 3.1)

Scientific classification
- Kingdom: Animalia
- Phylum: Chordata
- Class: Amphibia
- Order: Anura
- Family: Hylidae
- Genus: Boana
- Species: B. marginata

Binomial name
- Boana marginata (Boulenger, 1887)

Synonyms
- Hyla marginata Boulenger, 1887; Hypsiboas marginatus (Boulenger, 1887)

= Mundo Novo tree frog =

Species of amphibian

The Mundo Novo tree frog (Boana marginata) is a species of frog in the family Hylidae. It is endemic to south-eastern Brazil where it is known from the easternmost Rio Grande do Sul and adjacent southeastern Santa Catarina. Its natural habitats are forested mountain slopes near streams with clear running water. The eggs are deposited on vegetation hanging into the water. It is a common species although habitat loss and water pollution are threats.
