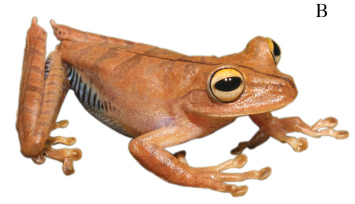

Scientific classification
- Kingdom: Animalia
- Phylum: Chordata
- Class: Amphibia
- Order: Anura
- Family: Hylidae
- Genus: Boana
- Species: B. almendarizae

Binomial name
- Boana almendarizae (Caminer and Ron, 2014)

Synonyms
- Hypsiboas almendarizae Caminer and Ron, 2014

= Boana almendarizae =

Species of amphibian

Boana almendarizae, or Almendariz's tree frog, is a frog in the family Hylidae endemic to Ecuador. Scientists have seen it between 500 and 1950 meters above sea level in the Andes Mountains.

The adult male frog measures 34.3 to 44.6 mm in snout-vent length and the adult female frog measures 37.8 to 51.9 cm.

This skin of the frog's dorsum is light brown to reddish brown in color, sometimes with dark bands or transverse lines. It has one larger medium-brown line down each side of its body and small white and brown spots across its back. Some of the large female frogs have blue coloring on their flanks. Males have light blue. This frog has large eyes.

This species is nocturnal. People find it on plants no more than 1.5 meters above the ground, especially near the edges of bodies of water, such as rivers, flooded areas, and small ponds. This frog is sympatric with Boana calcarata.
