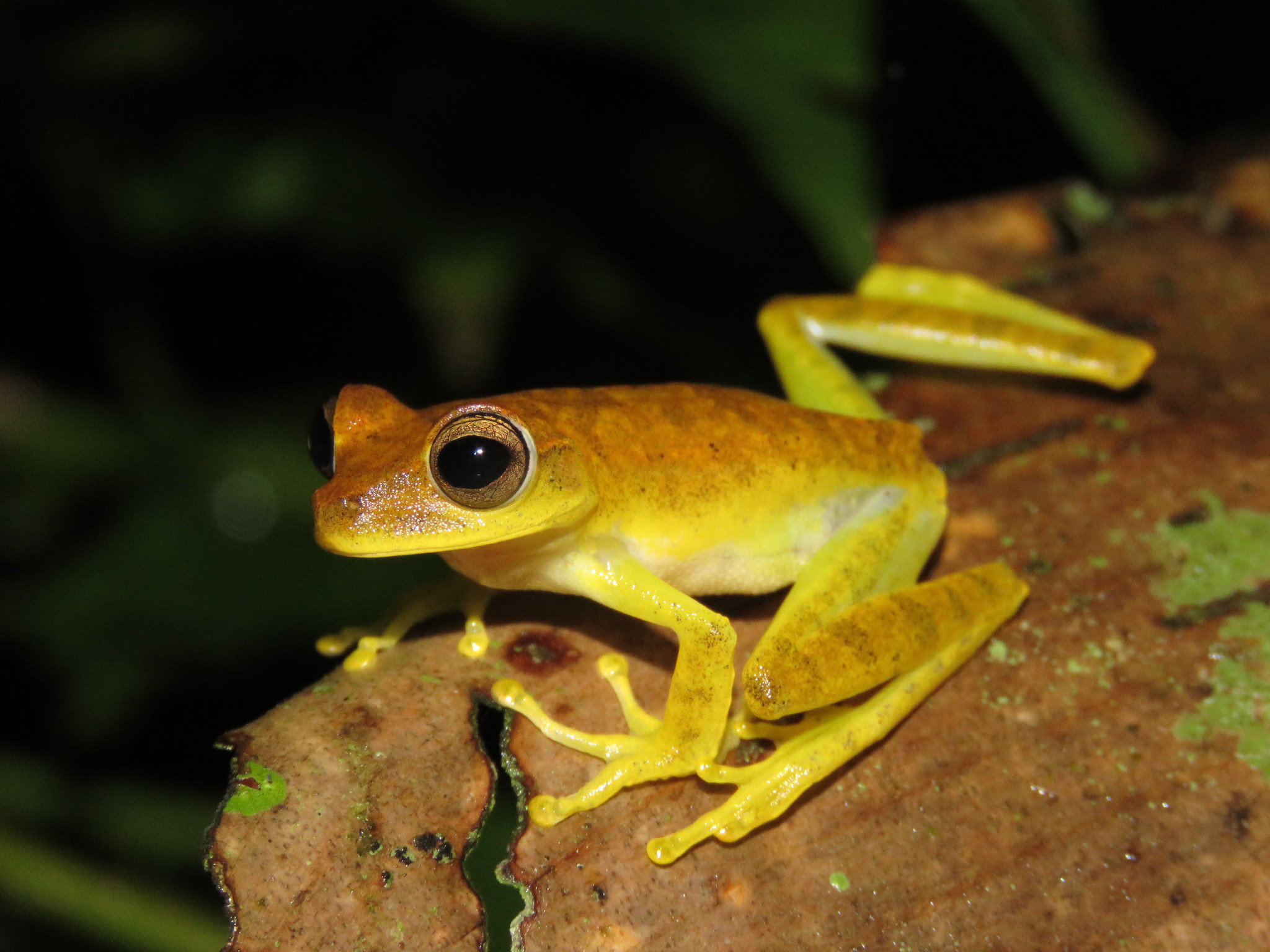

Scientific classification
- Kingdom: Animalia
- Phylum: Chordata
- Class: Amphibia
- Order: Anura
- Family: Hylidae
- Genus: Boana
- Species: B. steinbachi

Binomial name
- Boana steinbachi (Boulenger, 1905)

Synonyms
- Hyla steinbachi Boulenger, 1905; Hypsiboas steinbachi Caminer and Ron, 2014

= Boana steinbachi =

Species of frog

Boana steinbachi is a frog that endemic to Amazonia. It has been found in Brazil, Peru, and Bolivia. The species was originally synonymized with the Gunther's banded tree frog (Boana fasciata) but was resurrected as a species in 2014.
