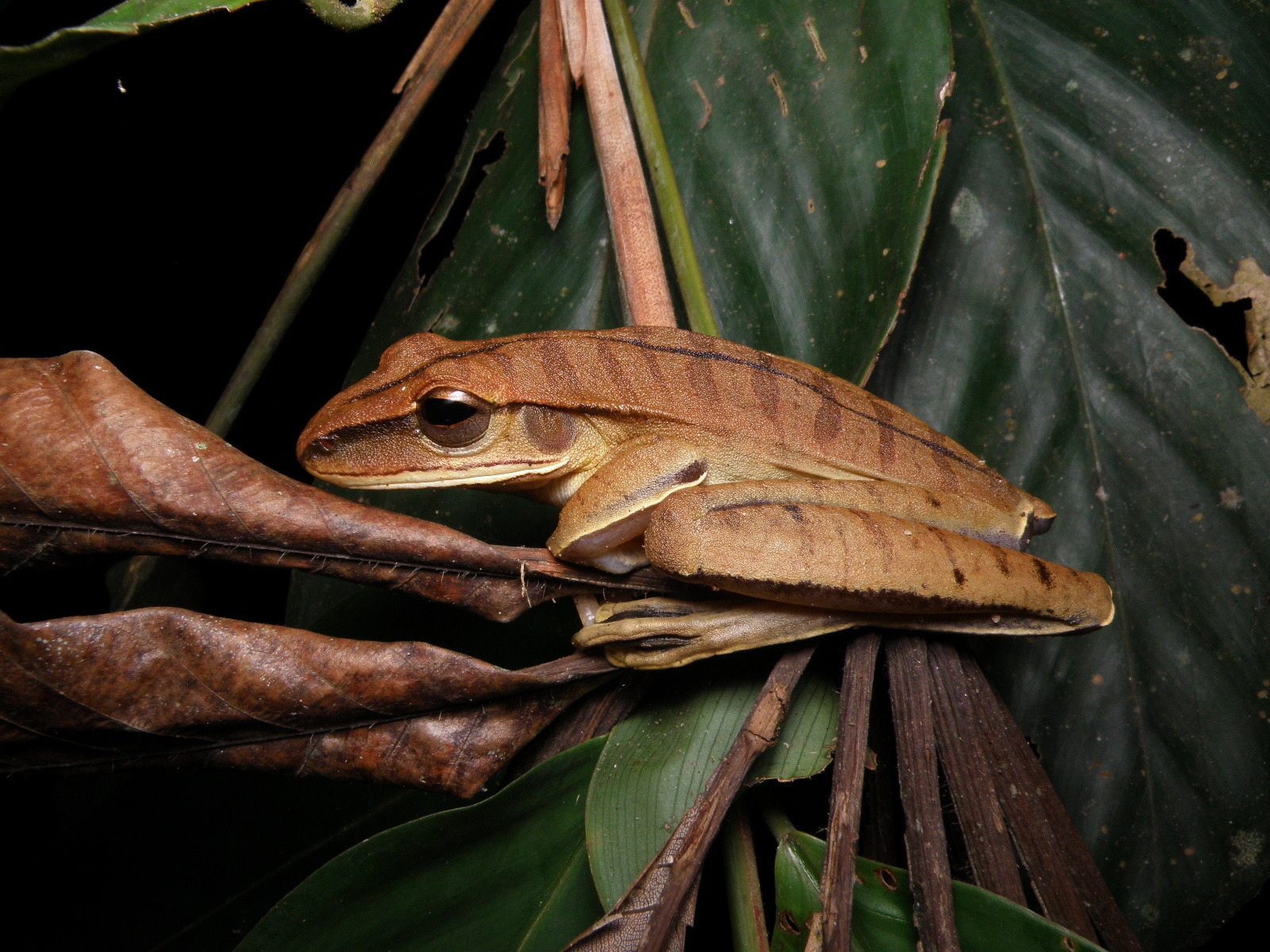

Conservation status
- Least Concern (IUCN 3.1)

Scientific classification
- Kingdom: Animalia
- Phylum: Chordata
- Class: Amphibia
- Order: Anura
- Family: Hylidae
- Genus: Boana
- Species: B. leucocheila

Binomial name
- Boana leucocheila (Caramaschi & de Niemeyer, 2003)

Synonyms
- Hypsiboas leucocheilus (Caramaschi & de Niemeyer, 2003)

= Boana leucocheila =

Species of frog

Boana leucocheila is a species of frog in the family Hylidae that is endemic to Brazil. Its natural habitats are subtropical or tropical moist lowland forests, moist savanna, rivers, freshwater marshes, and intermittent freshwater marshes.
