= Hyla palliata =

Conservation status
- Data Deficient (IUCN 3.1)

Scientific classification
- Kingdom: Animalia
- Phylum: Chordata
- Class: Amphibia
- Order: Anura
- Superfamily: Hyloidea
- Family: Hylidae
- Genus: Boana?
- Species: "H." palliata

Binomial name
- "Hyla" palliata Cope, 1863

Synonyms
- Hypsiboas palliatus (Cope, 1863)

Doubtful name for a species of amphibian

Hyla palliata is a nomen inquirendum or nomen dubium that could refer to some species of Boana, a genus of tree frogs. It was originally given by Edward Drinker Cope in 1863 to a specimen (holotype) collected from an unspecific location in Paraguay. The specimen is now lost and it is not possible to assign this name to any known species.
