= Cagua tree frog =

Conservation status
- Data Deficient (IUCN 3.1)

Scientific classification
- Kingdom: Animalia
- Phylum: Chordata
- Class: Amphibia
- Order: Anura
- Family: Hylidae
- Genus: Boana
- Species: B. alemani

Binomial name
- Boana alemani (Rivero, 1964)

Synonyms
- Hypsiboas alemani (Rivero, 1964)

Species of amphibian

The Cagua tree frog (Boana alemani) is a species of frog in the family Hylidae endemic to Venezuela. Its natural habitats are subtropical or tropical moist lowland forests, rivers, freshwater marshes, and intermittent freshwater marshes. It is threatened by habitat loss.
