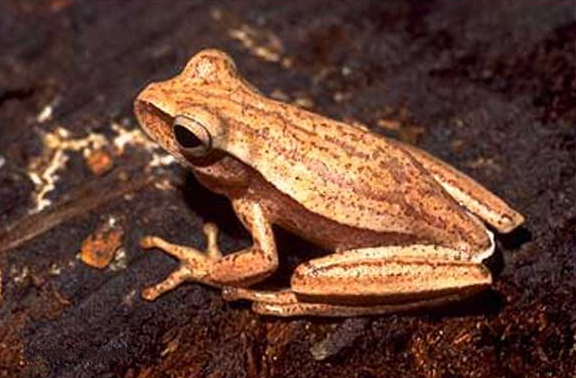

Conservation status
- Least Concern (IUCN 3.1)

Scientific classification
- Kingdom: Animalia
- Phylum: Chordata
- Class: Amphibia
- Order: Anura
- Family: Hylidae
- Genus: Boana
- Species: B. guentheri

Binomial name
- Boana guentheri (Boulenger, 1886)

Synonyms
- Hypsiboas guentheri (Boulenger, 1886)

= Boana guentheri =

Species of frog

Boana guentheri is a species of frog in the family Hylidae that is endemic to Brazil. Its natural habitats are subtropical or tropical moist lowland forests, subtropical or tropical moist shrubland, freshwater marshes, intermittent freshwater marshes, arable land, pastureland, rural gardens, and seasonally flooded agricultural land.
