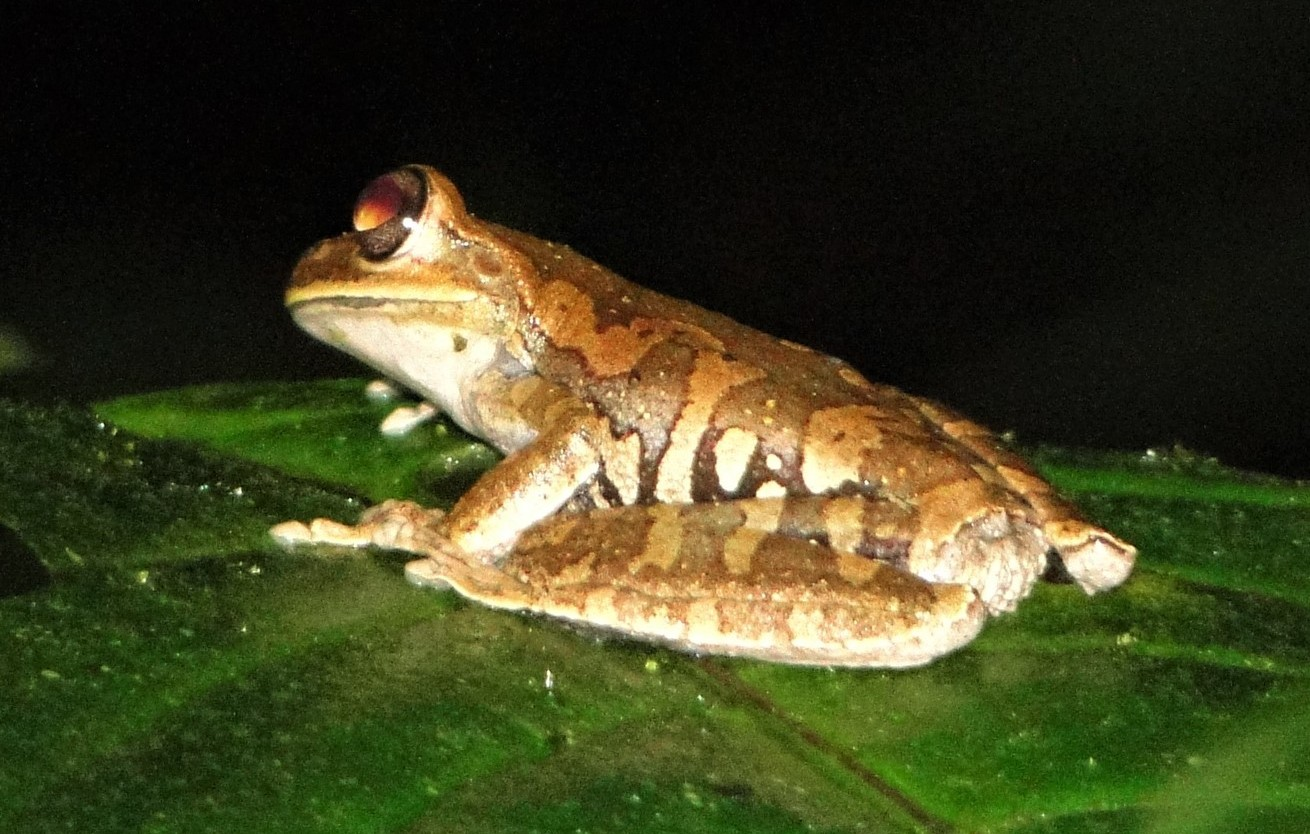

Conservation status
- Least Concern (IUCN 3.1)

Scientific classification
- Kingdom: Animalia
- Phylum: Chordata
- Class: Amphibia
- Order: Anura
- Family: Hylidae
- Genus: Boana
- Species: B. callipleura

Binomial name
- Boana callipleura (Boulenger, 1902)

Synonyms
- Hypsiboas callipleura (Boulenger, 1902)

= Charuplaya tree frog =

Species of amphibian

The Charuplaya tree frog (Boana callipleura) is a species of frog in the family Hylidae endemic to Bolivia. Its natural habitats are subtropical or tropical moist montane forests, rivers, and canals and ditches.
