= Hoogmoed's tree frog =

Conservation status
- Least Concern (IUCN 3.1)

Scientific classification
- Kingdom: Animalia
- Phylum: Chordata
- Class: Amphibia
- Order: Anura
- Family: Hylidae
- Genus: Boana
- Species: B. roraima

Binomial name
- Boana roraima (Duellman & Hoogmoed, 1992)

Synonyms
- Hypsiboas roraima (Duellman & Hoogmoed, 1992)

Species of amphibian

Hoogmoed's tree frog (Boana roraima) is a species of frog in the family Hylidae found in Guyana, possibly Brazil, and possibly Venezuela. Its natural habitats are subtropical or tropical moist montane forests and rivers.

== Sources ==
- Reynolds, R., Hoogmoed, M., MacCulloch, R. & Gaucher, P. 2004. Hypsiboas roraima. 2006 IUCN Red List of Threatened Species. Downloaded on 21 July 2007.
