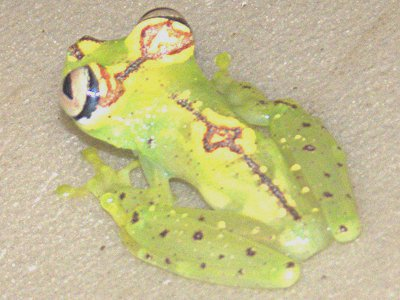

Conservation status
- Least Concern (IUCN 3.1)

Scientific classification
- Kingdom: Animalia
- Phylum: Chordata
- Class: Amphibia
- Order: Anura
- Family: Hylidae
- Genus: Boana
- Species: B. ornatissima

Binomial name
- Boana ornatissima (Noble, 1923)

Synonyms
- Hypsiboas ornatissimus (Noble, 1923)

= Ornate tree frog =

Species of amphibian

The ornate tree frog (Boana ornatissima) is a species of frogs in the family Hylidae found in Brazil, Colombia, French Guiana, Guyana, Suriname, and Venezuela. Its natural habitats are subtropical or tropical moist lowland forests, freshwater marshes, and intermittent freshwater marshes.
