= Boana curupi =

Conservation status
- Least Concern (IUCN 3.1)

Scientific classification
- Kingdom: Animalia
- Phylum: Chordata
- Class: Amphibia
- Order: Anura
- Family: Hylidae
- Genus: Boana
- Species: B. curupi

Binomial name
- Boana curupi (Garcia, Faivovich, and Haddad, 2007)

Synonyms
- Hypsiboas curupi Garcia, Faivovich, and Haddad, 2007

Species of frog

Boana curupi, the yellow-spotted tree frog, fasciated frog or spotted tree frog, is a frog endemic to Paraguay, Brazil, and Argentina. Scientists have seen it between 300 and 700 m (980 and 2,300 ft) above sea level.

The adult male frog measures 29 to 43.4 mm (1.14 to 1.71 in) in snout-vent length, and the adult female frog 41.3 to 47 mm (1.63 to 1.85 in). This frog has two sets of five vomerine teeth.

This frog is dark coffee-brown in color with darker patches and a white stripe on its lip. It is lighter at the throat. Its bones are green and the iris of its eye is gold.

The frog's name comes from "Curupi," also called "Curipira" or "Kurupira," a creature from folklore that protects the forest and the living things in it.
