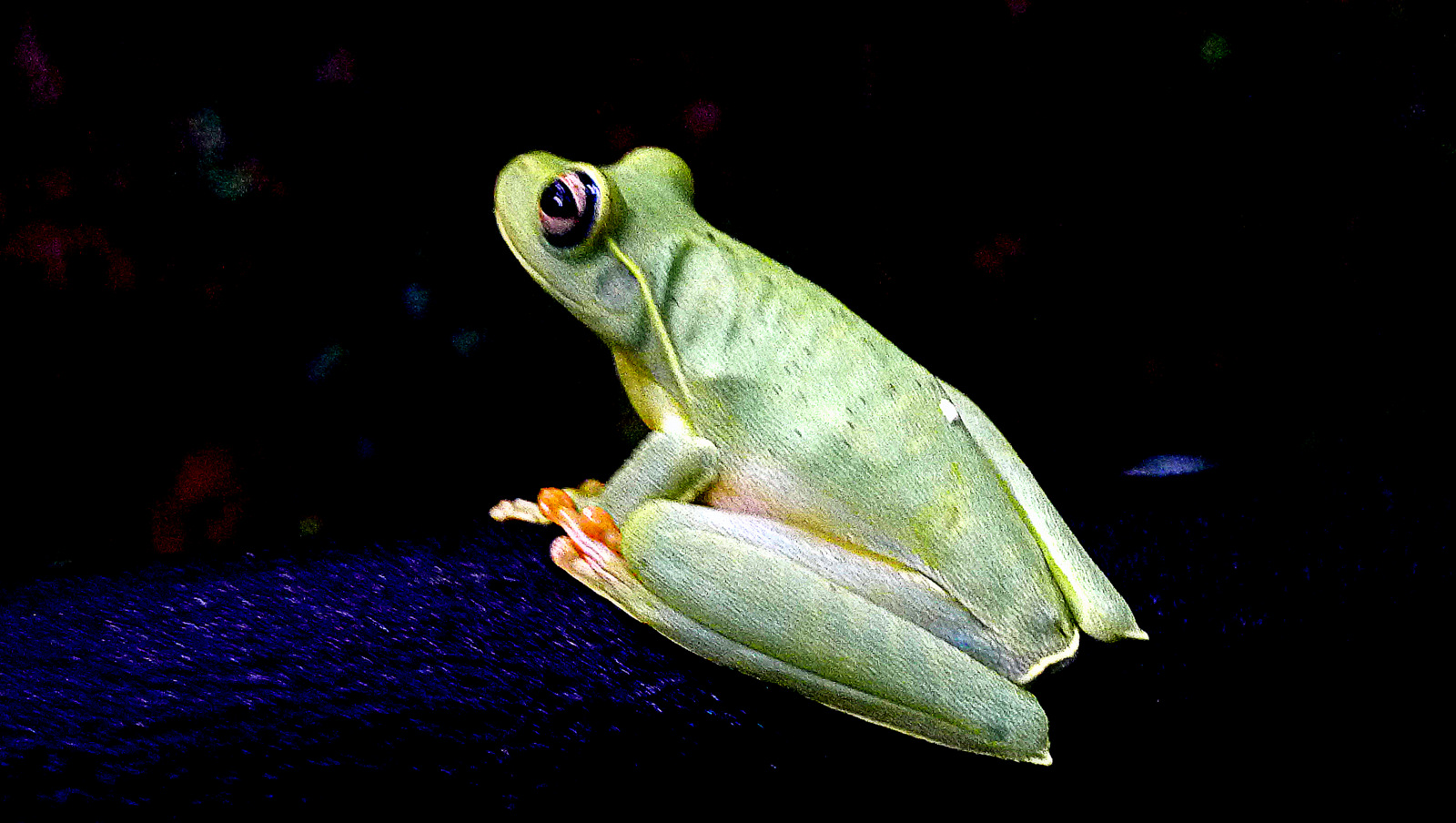

Conservation status
- Least Concern (IUCN 3.1)

Scientific classification
- Kingdom: Animalia
- Phylum: Chordata
- Class: Amphibia
- Order: Anura
- Family: Hylidae
- Genus: Boana
- Species: B. albomarginata

Binomial name
- Boana albomarginata (Spix, 1824)

Synonyms
- Hypsiboas albomarginatus (Spix, 1824)

= White-edged tree frog =

Species of amphibian

The white-edged tree frog (Boana albomarginata) is a species of frog in the taxonomic family Hylidae endemic to Brazil.

== Habitat ==
B. albomarginata natural habitats are subtropical or tropical moist lowland forests, rivers, freshwater marshes, intermittent freshwater marshes, rural gardens, and heavily degraded former forests. The Boana albomarginata is a species of which are arboreal but resulting from reproductive patterns, these species are commonly found in ponds and small creeks as these are desired habitats for reproduction.
