= Boana caipora =

Scientific classification
- Kingdom: Animalia
- Phylum: Chordata
- Class: Amphibia
- Order: Anura
- Family: Hylidae
- Genus: Boana
- Species: B. caipora

Binomial name
- Boana caipora (Antunes, Faivovich, and Haddad, 2008)

Synonyms
- Hypsiboas caipora Antunes, Faivovich, and Haddad, 2008; Boana caipora Dubois, 2017

Species of frog

Boana caipora is a frog in the family Hylidae. It is endemic to Brazil. Scientists have seen it 700 to 800 meters above sea level in Atlantic forest.

== Original description ==
- André Pinassi Antunes; Julian Faivovich; Célio F. B. Haddad (March 21, 2008). "A new species of Hypsiboas from the Atlantic Forest of southeastern Brazil (Amphibia:Anura:Hylidae)". Copeia (Abstract). 2008 (1): 179–190. doi:10.1643/CH-06-163. hdl:11336/113247. S2CID 84529246.
