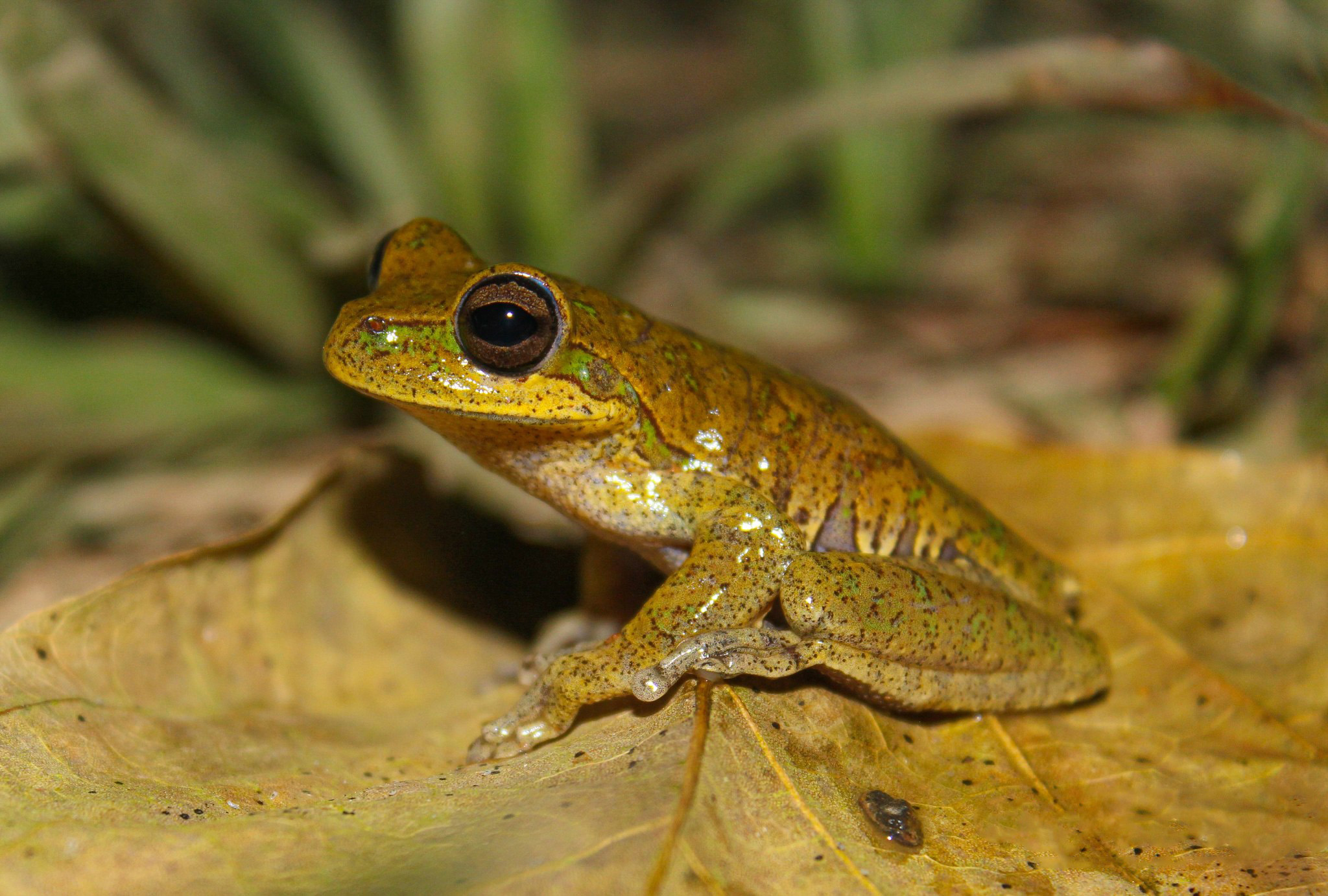

Conservation status
- Least Concern (IUCN 3.1)

Scientific classification
- Kingdom: Animalia
- Phylum: Chordata
- Class: Amphibia
- Order: Anura
- Family: Hylidae
- Genus: Boana
- Species: B. balzani

Binomial name
- Boana balzani (Boulenger, 1898)

Synonyms
- Hypsiboas balzani (Boulenger, 1898)

= Yungas tree frog =

Species of amphibian

The Yungas tree frog (Boana balzani) is a species of frog in the family Hylidae found in Bolivia and Peru. Its natural habitats are subtropical or tropical moist lowland forests, subtropical or tropical moist montane forests, rivers, and canals and ditches.
