= La Escalera tree frog =

Conservation status
- Least Concern (IUCN 3.1)

Scientific classification
- Kingdom: Animalia
- Phylum: Chordata
- Class: Amphibia
- Order: Anura
- Family: Hylidae
- Genus: Boana
- Species: B. sibleszi

Binomial name
- Boana sibleszi (Rivero, 1971)

Synonyms
- Hypsiboas sibleszi (Rivero, 1971)

Species of amphibian

The La Escalera tree frog (Boana sibleszi) is a species of frog in the family Hylidae found in Guyana, Venezuela, and possibly Brazil. Its natural habitats are subtropical or tropical moist lowland forests, subtropical or tropical moist montane forests, rivers, and freshwater marshes.

== Sources ==
- MacCulloch, R.D. and A. Lathrop. 2005. Hylid frogs from Mount Ayanganna, Guyana: new species, redescriptions and distributional records. Phyllomedusa 4: 17–37.
- MacCulloch, R.D. and A. Lathrop. 2009. Herpetofauna of Mount Ayanganna, Guyana. Results of the Royal Ontario Museum Ayanganna Expedition 2000. Royal Ontario Museum Science Contributions 4: 36 pp.
