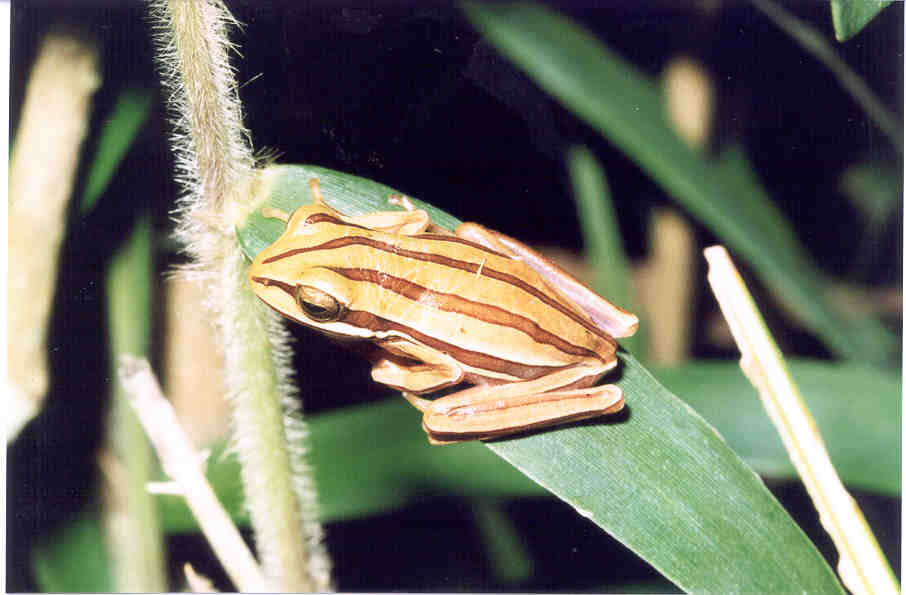

Conservation status
- Near Threatened (IUCN 3.1)

Scientific classification
- Kingdom: Animalia
- Phylum: Chordata
- Class: Amphibia
- Order: Anura
- Family: Hylidae
- Genus: Boana
- Species: B. cipoensis

Binomial name
- Boana cipoensis (B. Lutz, 1968)

Synonyms
- Hypsiboas cipoensis (B. Lutz, 1968)

= Boana cipoensis =

Species of frog

Boana cipoensis is a species of frog in the family Hylidae that is endemic to Brazil. Its natural habitats are subtropical or tropical moist montane forests, dry savanna, moist savanna, rivers, and intermittent rivers. It is threatened by habitat loss.
