= Boana caiapo =

Scientific classification
- Kingdom: Animalia
- Phylum: Chordata
- Class: Amphibia
- Order: Anura
- Family: Hylidae
- Genus: Boana
- Species: B. caiapo

Binomial name
- Boana caiapo Pinheiro, Cintra, Valdujo, Silva, Martins, Silva, and Garcia, 2018

Species of frog

Boana caiapo is a frog in the family Hylidae. It is endemic to Brazil.

This frog is distinguished from other frogs in the Boana albopunctata group in that its head appears rounded from the dorsal view. It has three longitudinal beige stripes down its back, interspersed with two dark brown stripes. The backs of its hind legs are purple with dark spots.
