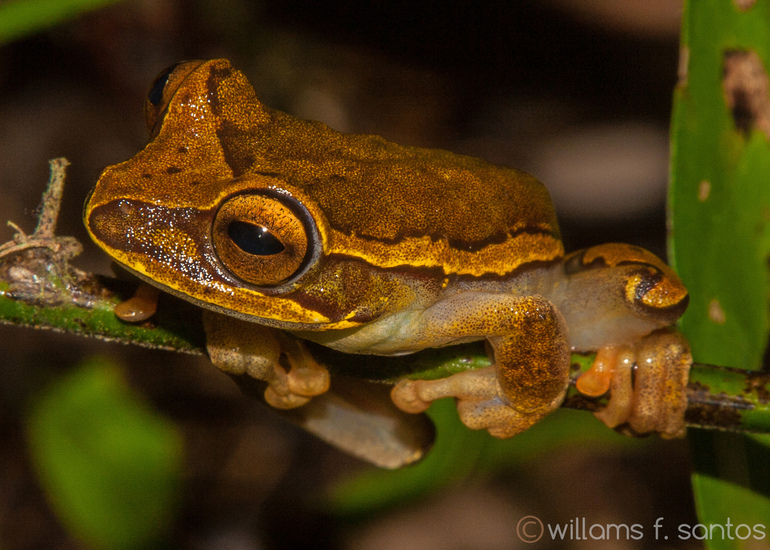
- An adult at Murici Ecological Station, Alagoas, Brazil.

Conservation status
- Endangered (IUCN 3.1)

Scientific classification
- Kingdom: Animalia
- Phylum: Chordata
- Class: Amphibia
- Order: Anura
- Family: Hylidae
- Genus: Boana
- Species: B. freicanecae

Binomial name
- Boana freicanecae (Carnaval & Peixoto, 2004)

Synonyms
- Hypsiboas freicanecae (Carnaval & Peixoto, 2004)

= Boana freicanecae =

Species of frog

Boana freicanecae is a species of frog in the family Hylidae and is endemic to Brazil. Its natural habitats are subtropical or tropical moist lowland forests and rivers.
