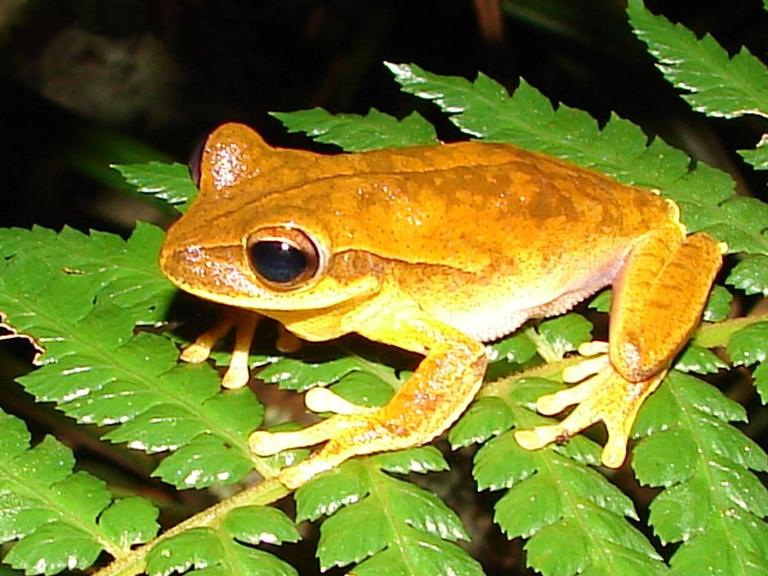

Conservation status
- Least Concern (IUCN 3.1)

Scientific classification
- Kingdom: Animalia
- Phylum: Chordata
- Class: Amphibia
- Order: Anura
- Family: Hylidae
- Genus: Boana
- Species: B. bischoffi

Binomial name
- Boana bischoffi (Boulenger, 1887)

Synonyms
- Hypsiboas bischoffi (Boulenger, 1887)

= Bischoff's tree frog =

Species of amphibian

Bischoff's tree frog (Boana bischoffi) is a species of frog in the family Hylidae endemic to Brazil. Its natural habitats are subtropical or tropical moist lowland forests, rivers, freshwater lakes, freshwater marshes, and plantations. It is threatened by habitat loss.
