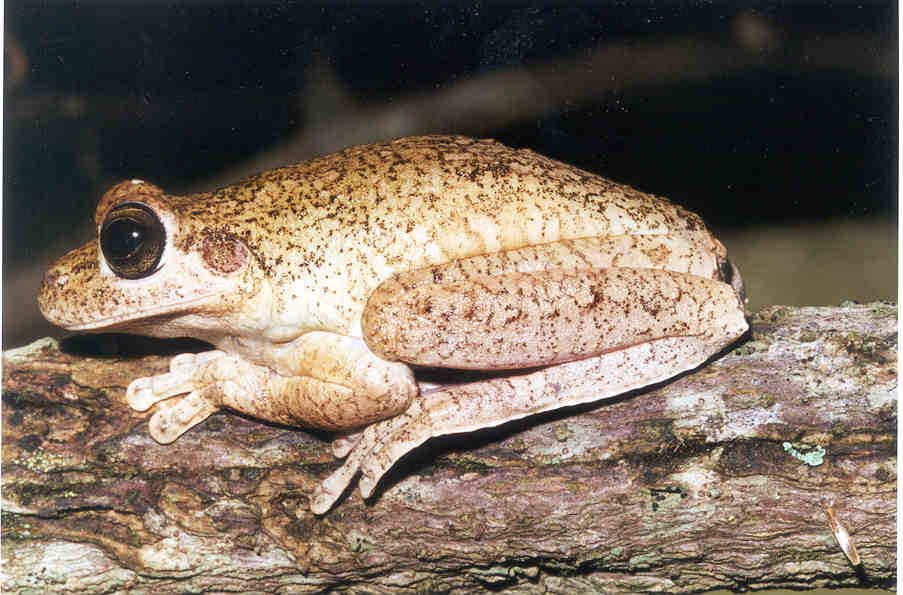

Conservation status
- Least Concern (IUCN 3.1)

Scientific classification
- Kingdom: Animalia
- Phylum: Chordata
- Class: Amphibia
- Order: Anura
- Family: Hylidae
- Genus: Boana
- Species: B. lundii

Binomial name
- Boana lundii (Burmeister, 1856)

Synonyms
- Hyla biobeba Bokermann & Sazima, 1974; Hyla punctatissima Reinhardt & Lütken, 1862; Hyla pustulosa Reinhardt & Lütken, 1862; Hypsiboas lundii (Burmeister, 1856)

= Usina tree frog =

Species of amphibian

The Usina tree frog (Boana lundii) is a species of frog in the family Hylidae endemic to Brazil. Its natural habitats are subtropical or tropical moist lowland forests, subtropical or tropical moist montane forests, moist savanna, rivers, and plantations .
