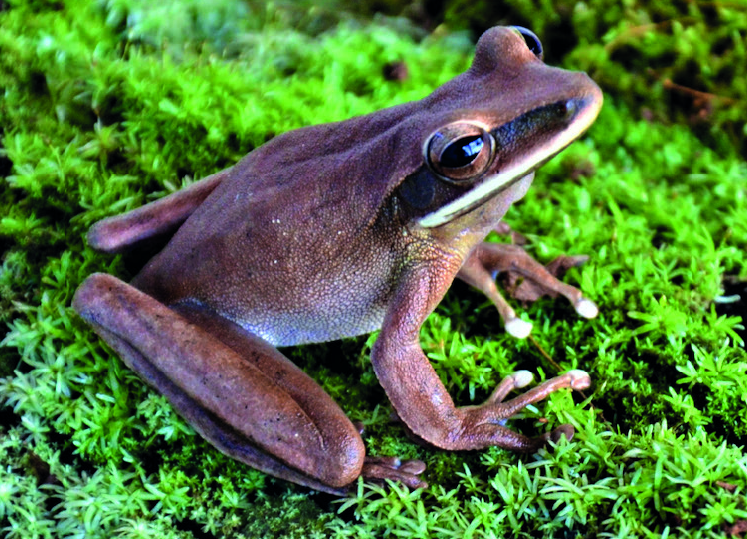
- Amapá, Brazil

Conservation status
- Least Concern (IUCN 3.1)

Scientific classification
- Kingdom: Animalia
- Phylum: Chordata
- Class: Amphibia
- Order: Anura
- Family: Hylidae
- Genus: Boana
- Species: B. lanciformis

Binomial name
- Boana lanciformis Cope, 1870

Synonyms
- Hyla lanciformis ssp. guerreroi Rivero, 1971; Hypsiboas lanciformis Cope, 1870

= Basin tree frog =

Species of amphibian

The basin tree frog (Boana lanciformis) is a species of frog in the family Hylidae found in Bolivia, Brazil, Colombia, Ecuador, Peru, and Venezuela. Its natural habitats are subtropical or tropical moist lowland forests, subtropical or tropical swamps, rivers, freshwater lakes, freshwater marshes, intermittent freshwater marshes, rural gardens, and heavily degraded former forests.

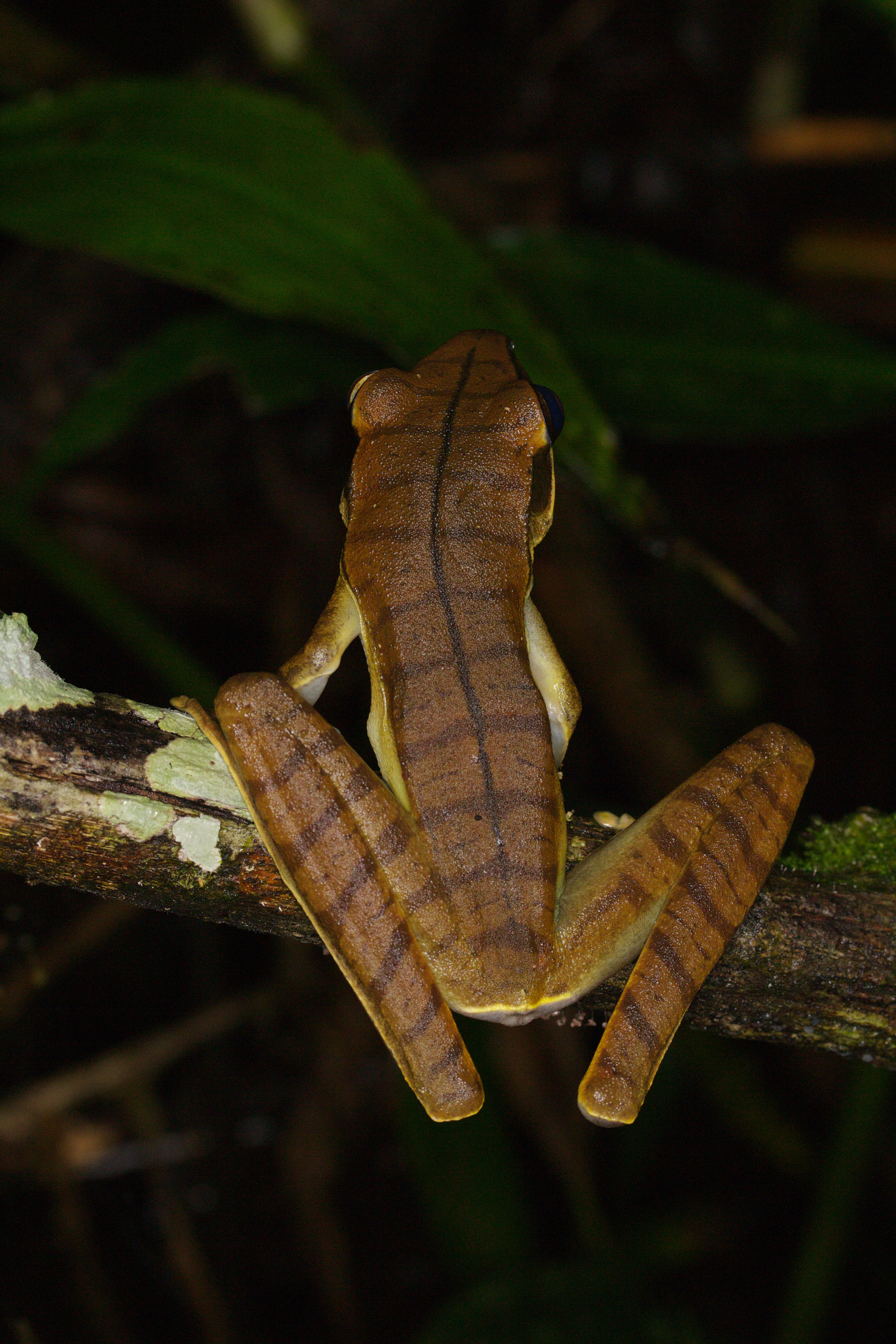
