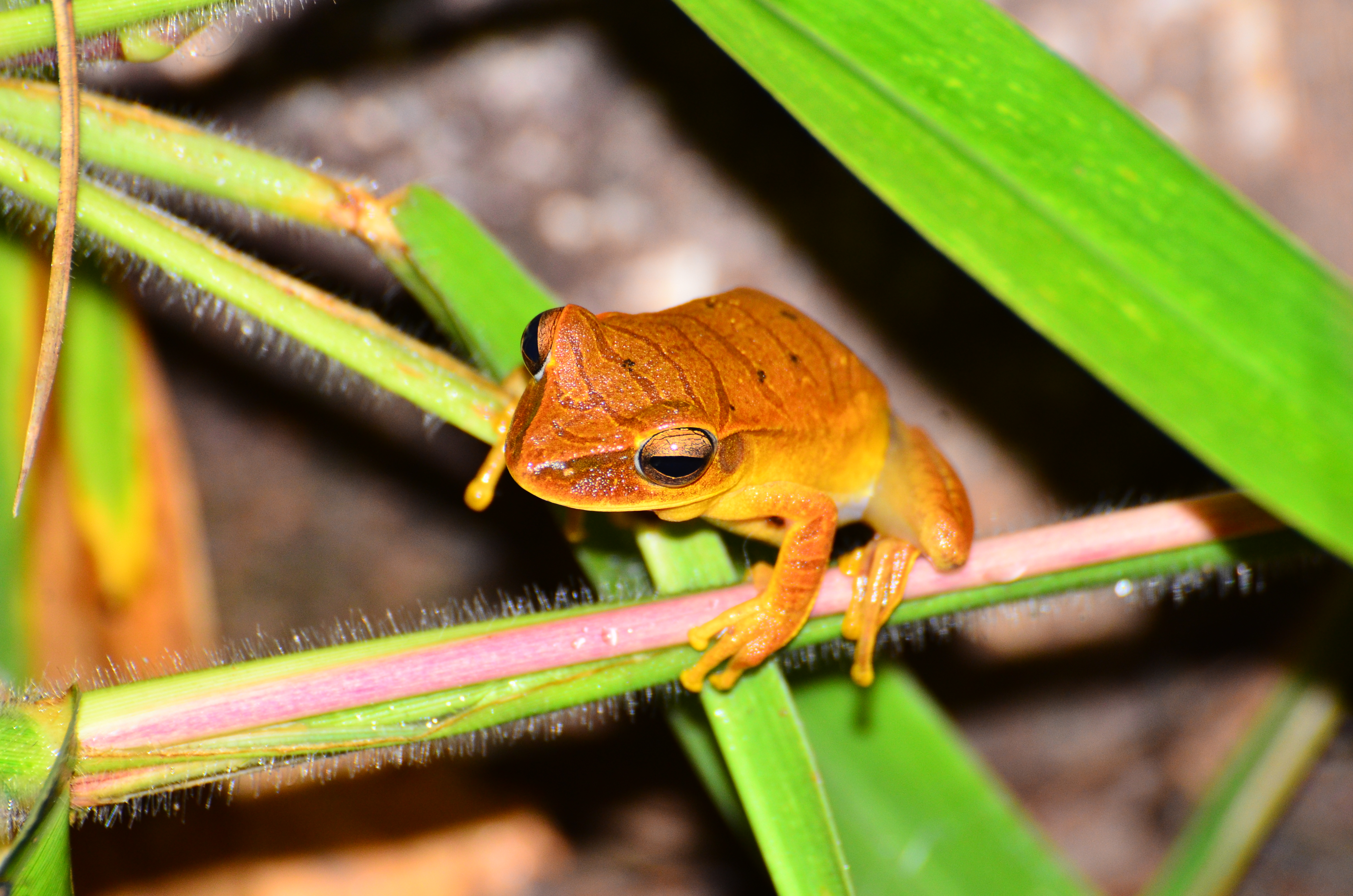

Conservation status
- Least Concern (IUCN 3.1)< ref name=IUCN />

Scientific classification
- Kingdom: Animalia
- Phylum: Chordata
- Class: Amphibia
- Order: Anura
- Family: Hylidae
- Genus: Boana
- Species: B. paranaiba

Binomial name
- Boana paranaiba (Carvalho and Giaretta, 2010)

Synonyms
- Hypsiboas paranaiba Carvalho and Giaretta, 2010

= Boana paranaiba =

Species of frog

Boana paranaiba is a frog in the family Hylidae. It is endemic to Brazil.

== Description ==
The scientists who first described this frog observed an average male snout-vent length of 46.3–52.3 mm (1.82–2.06 in) and an average female snout-vent length of 46.2–51.2 mm (1.82–2.02 in). The iris of the eye can be bronze in color or gray in color, with a whole or half blue ring. The skin of the dorsum is reddish to yellow in color with irregular dark spots. There are wide, brown stripes down its back and all four legs, outlined in white. This frog has a thin white line on its mouth. It has a dark brown line from its nose to each eye. It has a dark brown line under its ear. It has dark spots near its jaw. Its belly is yellow or whitish in color. The insides of the back legs are dark brown with light spots.

== Etymology ==
The frog is named after the Paranaíba River. The name paranabia comes from the Tupi language. It means "large river with muddy water."

== Habitat ==
This frog is a habitat generalist, seen in Caatinga, Cerrado, and Atlantic Forests, palm grove marshes, and nearby open areas. Scientists have seen it 600 m (1,970 ft) above sea level and in several protected places: APA da Serra das Gales e da Portaria, APA Serra da Jiboia, MONA Ponte de Pedra do Rio Correntes, and PARES do Jalapão.

== Reproduction ==
Male frogs were found singing while seated on the ground or perched on vegetation up to 2 metres (6 ft 7 in) high. Scientists observed superficial scars on the backs of many male frogs and hypothesised they were caused by male-male interactions.

== Threats ==
The IUCN classifies this species as least concern of extinction. What threat it faces comes from habitat loss in favor of urbanization and cattle farming.
