= Lema tree frog =

Conservation status
- Least Concern (IUCN 3.1)

Scientific classification
- Kingdom: Animalia
- Phylum: Chordata
- Class: Amphibia
- Order: Anura
- Family: Hylidae
- Genus: Boana
- Species: B. lemai

Binomial name
- Boana lemai (Rivero, 1971)

Synonyms
- Hypsiboas lemai (Rivero, 1971)

Species of amphibian

The Lema tree frog (Boana lemai) is a species of frog in the family Hylidae found in Guyana, Venezuela, and possibly Brazil. Its natural habitats are subtropical or tropical moist lowland forests, subtropical or tropical moist montane forests, rivers, pastureland, rural gardens, heavily degraded former forests, aquaculture ponds, and canals and ditches. It is threatened by habitat loss.
