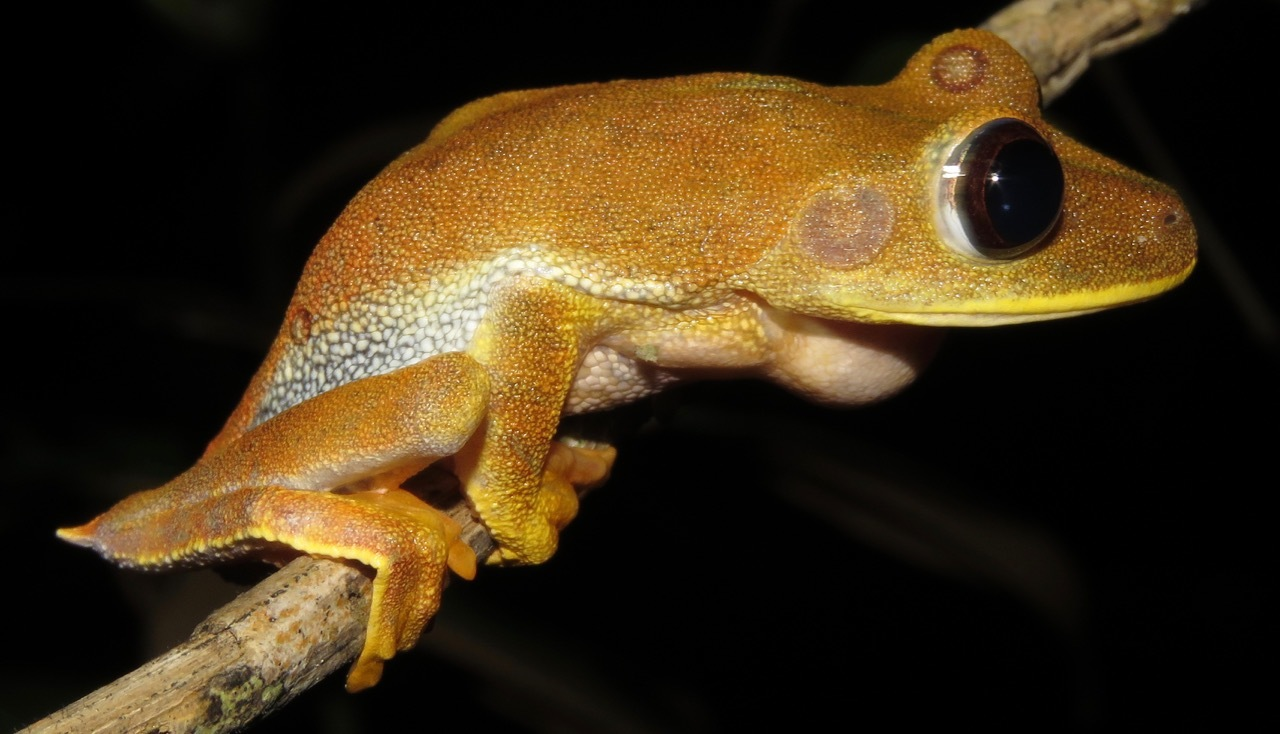

Conservation status
- Least Concern (IUCN 3.1)

Scientific classification
- Kingdom: Animalia
- Phylum: Chordata
- Class: Amphibia
- Order: Anura
- Family: Hylidae
- Genus: Boana
- Species: B. pombali

Binomial name
- Boana pombali (Caramaschi, Pimenta, and Feio, 2004)

Synonyms
- Hyla pombali Caramaschi, Pimenta, and Feio, 2004; Hypsiboas pombali (Caramaschi, Pimenta, and Feio, 2004)

= Boana pombali =

Species of frog

Boana pombali is a species of frog in the family Hylidae. It is endemic to south-eastern Brazil and found in Sergipe, eastern Bahia, northeastern Minas Gerais, and northern Espírito Santo states. It is named after José Perez Pombal, Jr., a Brazilian herpetologist.

Its natural habitats are primary and secondary forests, including forest borders and gallery forests, within the Atlantic Forest. It can even occur in some open habitats. It is threatened by habitat loss and fragmentation.
