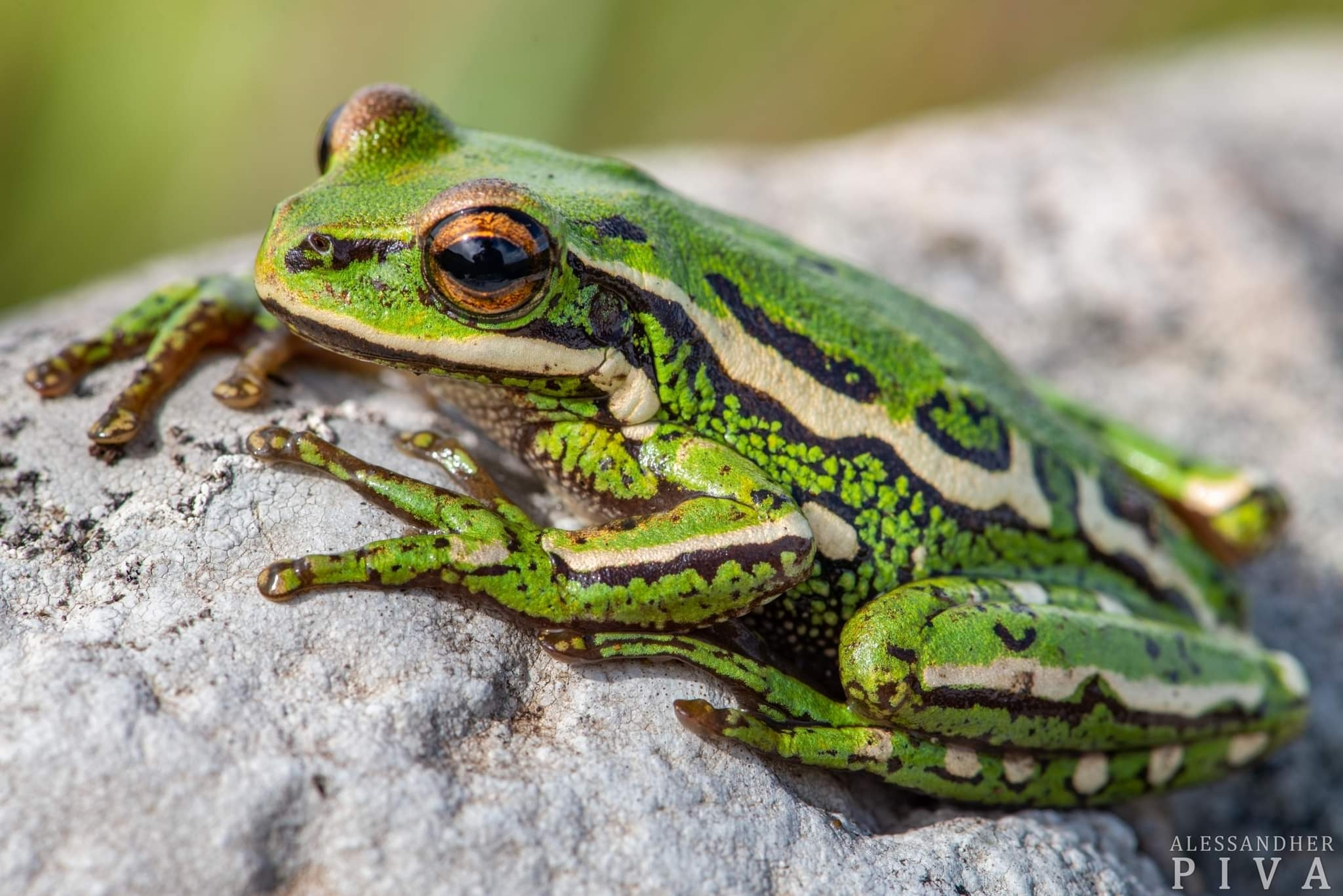

Conservation status
- Least Concern (IUCN 3.1)

Scientific classification
- Kingdom: Animalia
- Phylum: Chordata
- Class: Amphibia
- Order: Anura
- Family: Hylidae
- Genus: Boana
- Species: B. joaquini

Binomial name
- Boana joaquini (B. Lutz, 1968)

Synonyms
- Hypsiboas joaquini (B. Lutz, 1968)

= Boana joaquini =

Species of frog

Boana joaquini is a species of frog in the family Hylidae that is endemic to Brazil. Its natural habitats are subtropical or tropical seasonally wet or flooded lowland grassland, subtropical or tropical high-altitude grassland, rivers, and pastureland.
