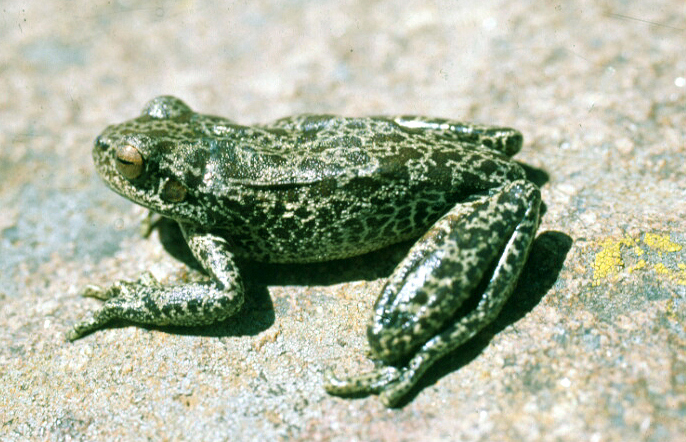

Conservation status
- Least Concern (IUCN 3.1)

Scientific classification
- Kingdom: Animalia
- Phylum: Chordata
- Class: Amphibia
- Order: Anura
- Family: Hylidae
- Genus: Boana
- Species: B. cordobae

Binomial name
- Boana cordobae (Barrio, 1965)

Synonyms
- Hypsiboas cordobae (Barrio, 1965)

= Boana cordobae =

Species of frog

Boana cordobae is a species of frog in the family Hylidae that is endemic to Argentina.

Its natural habitats are temperate forests, rivers, intermittent rivers, swamps, freshwater marshes, and intermittent freshwater marshes. Its status is insufficiently known.
