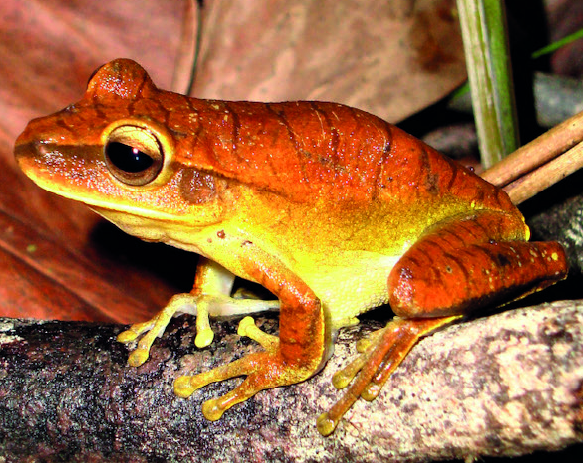
- Amapá, Brazil

Conservation status
- Least Concern (IUCN 3.1)

Scientific classification
- Kingdom: Animalia
- Phylum: Chordata
- Class: Amphibia
- Order: Anura
- Family: Hylidae
- Genus: Boana
- Species: B. multifasciata

Binomial name
- Boana multifasciata (Günther, 1859)

Synonyms
- Hypsiboas multifasciatus (Günther, 1859)

= Many-banded tree frog =

Species of amphibian

The many-banded tree frog (Boana multifasciata) is a species of frog in the family Hylidae found in Brazil, French Guiana, Guyana, Suriname, and Venezuela. Its natural habitats are subtropical or tropical dry forests, subtropical or tropical moist lowland forests, moist savanna, rivers, freshwater lakes, freshwater marshes, pastureland, rural gardens, heavily degraded former forests, and canals and ditches.

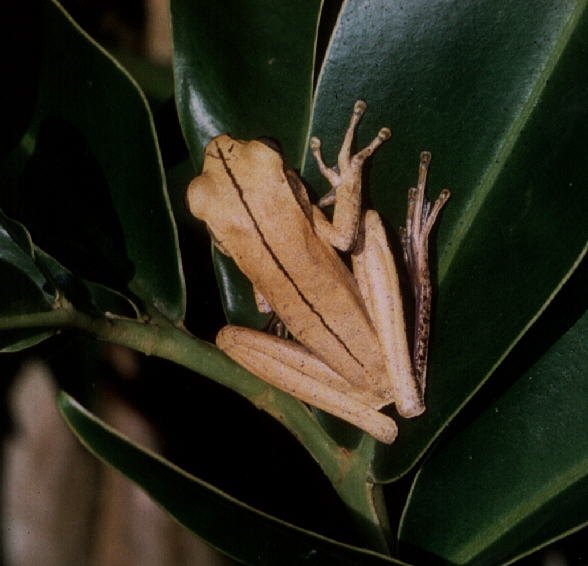

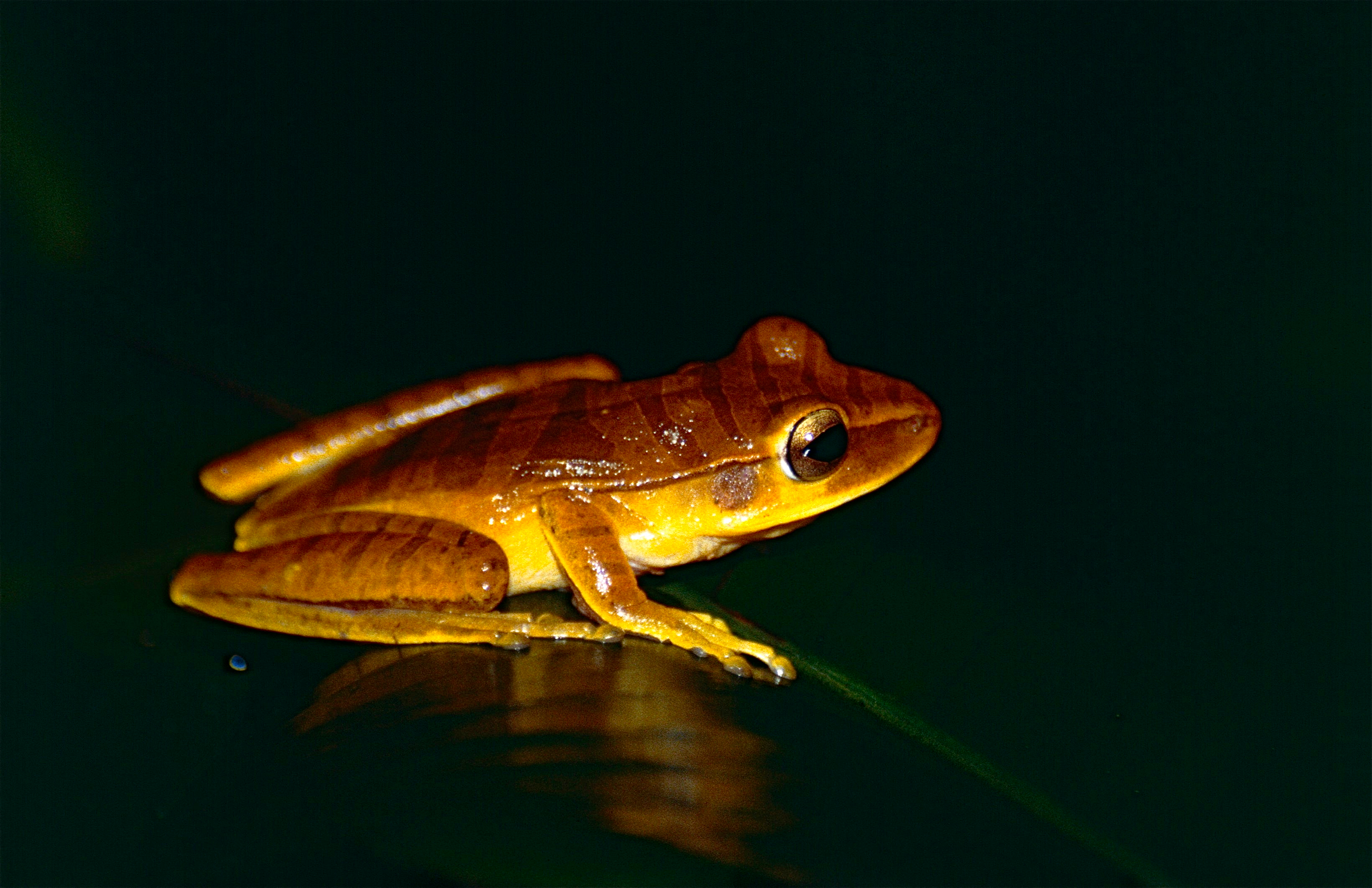
Roura, French Guiana

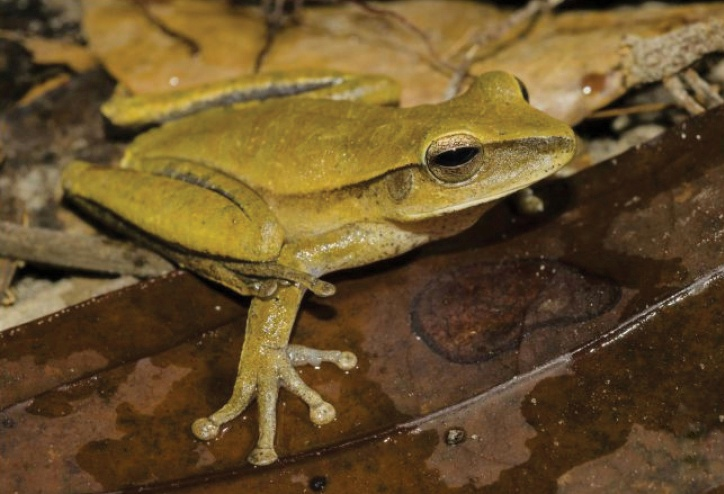
Roraima, Brazil
