= Boana stellae =

Conservation status
- Least Concern (IUCN 3.1)

Scientific classification
- Kingdom: Animalia
- Phylum: Chordata
- Class: Amphibia
- Order: Anura
- Family: Hylidae
- Genus: Boana
- Species: B. stellae

Binomial name
- Boana stellae (Kwet, 2008)

Synonyms
- Hypsiboas stellae Kwet, 2008

Species of frog

Boana stellae is a frog in the family Hylidae, endemic to Brazil. Scientists know it from the type locality: between 200 and 600 meters above sea level on the Araucaria plateau in Rio Grande do Sul.

The adult male frog measures 40.7 to 49.9 mm long in snout-vent length. The frog is brown in color on the dorsum with dark mottling. It has a wide stripe bordered in from snout to groin down each side of its body, and yellow spots on its flanks. The iris of the eye is gold or copper in color, lighter on the top half than on the bottom half.

This frog is a strict forest dweller, found near permanent bodies of water, such as streams and pools with rocky bottoms. Scientists recorded one clutch containing 200 eggs in the group but had some difficulty collecting living tadpoles. The tadpoles swim in fast water.
