= Barro Branco tree frog =

Conservation status
- Endangered (IUCN 3.1)

Scientific classification
- Kingdom: Animalia
- Phylum: Chordata
- Class: Amphibia
- Order: Anura
- Family: Hylidae
- Genus: Boana
- Species: B. secedens

Binomial name
- Boana secedens (Lutz, 1963)

Synonyms
- Hypsiboas secedens (Lutz, 1963); Hyla secedens (Lutz, 1963)

Species of amphibian

The Barro Branco tree frog (Boana secedens) is a species of frog in the family Hylidae endemic to Brazil. Its natural habitats are subtropical or tropical moist lowland forests, rivers, freshwater marshes, and intermittent freshwater marshes.
