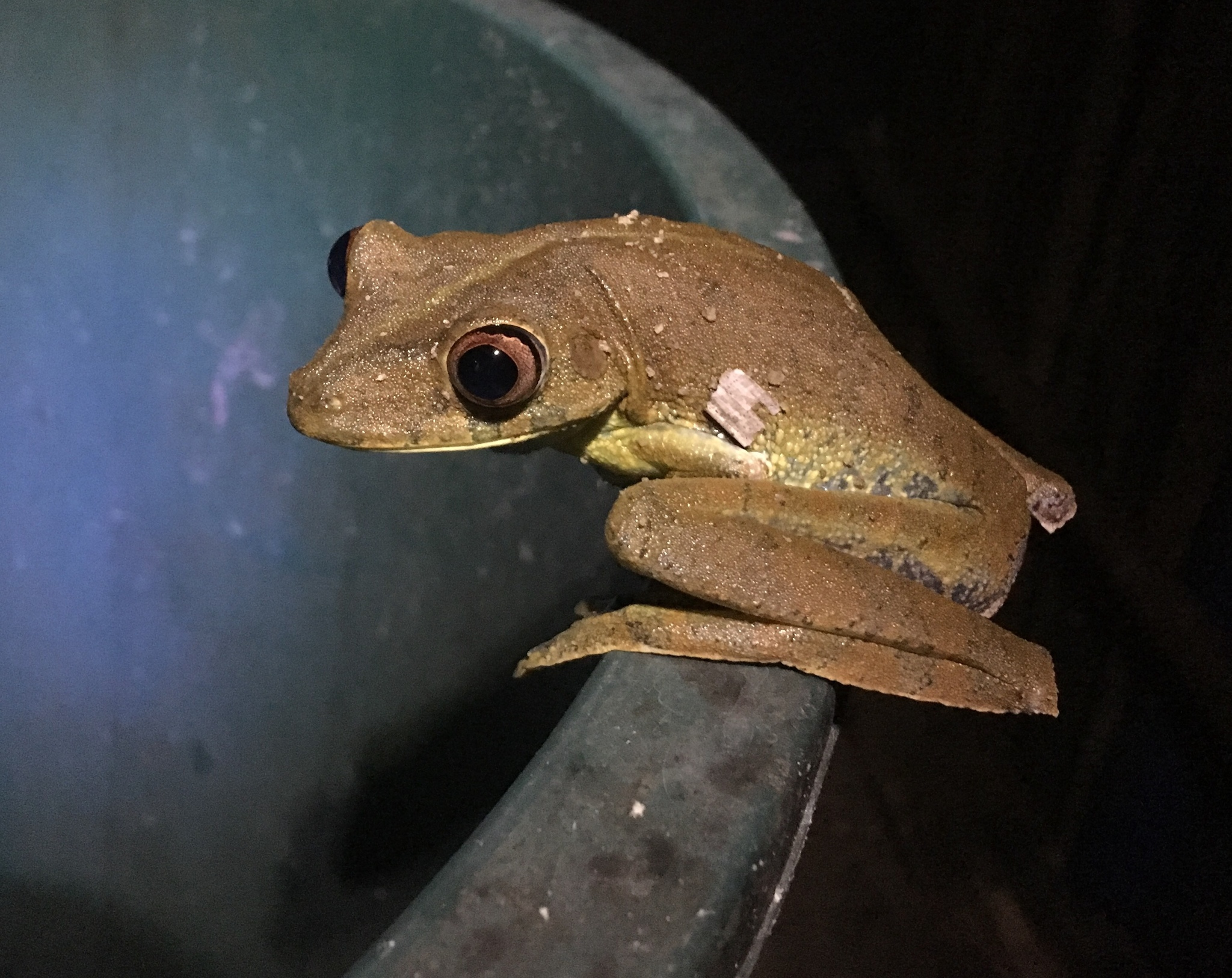

Conservation status
- Least Concern (IUCN 3.1)

Scientific classification
- Kingdom: Animalia
- Phylum: Chordata
- Class: Amphibia
- Order: Anura
- Family: Hylidae
- Genus: Boana
- Species: B. wavrini

Binomial name
- Boana wavrini (Parker, 1936)

Synonyms
- Hypsiboas wavrini (Parker, 1936)

= Upper Orinoco tree frog =

Species of amphibian

The Upper Orinoco tree frog (Boana wavrini) is a species of frog in the family Hylidae found in Brazil, Colombia, and Venezuela, and possibly Bolivia and Guyana. Its natural habitats are subtropical or tropical moist lowland forests, subtropical or tropical swamps, moist savanna, and rivers. It is threatened by habitat loss.
