= Boana jaguariaivensis =

Scientific classification
- Kingdom: Animalia
- Phylum: Chordata
- Class: Amphibia
- Order: Anura
- Family: Hylidae
- Genus: Boana
- Species: B. jaguariaivensis

Binomial name
- Boana jaguariaivensis (Caramaschi, Cruz, and Segalla, 2010)

Synonyms
- Hypsiboas jaguariaivensis Caramaschi, Cruz, and Segalla, 2010

Species of frog

Boana jaguariaivensis is a frog. Scientists have only seen it in one place, in Brazil.

The adult male frog is 23.9–28.8 mm long from nose to rear end. Each frog has two light brown stripes on its back, from its nose to its rear end and dark brown stripes closer to the middle of the body. There is also a white stripe on each side of the body.
