= Valle tree frog =

Conservation status
- Least Concern (IUCN 3.1)

Scientific classification
- Kingdom: Animalia
- Phylum: Chordata
- Class: Amphibia
- Order: Anura
- Family: Hylidae
- Genus: Boana
- Species: B. rubracyla

Binomial name
- Boana rubracyla (Cochran & Goin, 1970)

Synonyms
- Hypsiboas rubracylus (Cochran & Goin, 1970)

Species of amphibian

The Valle tree frog (Boana rubracyla) is a species of frog in the family Hylidae found in Colombia and possibly Ecuador. Its natural habitats are subtropical or tropical moist lowland forests, freshwater marshes, and intermittent freshwater marshes. It is threatened by habitat loss.
