= Boana icamiaba =

Scientific classification
- Kingdom: Animalia
- Phylum: Chordata
- Class: Amphibia
- Order: Anura
- Family: Hylidae
- Genus: Boana
- Species: B. icamiaba

Binomial name
- Boana icamiaba Peloso, Oliveira, Sturaro, Rodrigues, Lima, Bitar, Wheeler, and Aleixo, 2018

Species of frog

Boana icamiaba is a frog in the family Hylidae endemic to Brazil.

== Original description ==
- Peloso, Pedro L.V.; Oliveira, Renan M. De; Sturaro, Marcelo J.; Rodrigues, Miguel T.; Lima-Filho, Geraldo R.; Bitar, Youszef O.C.; Wheeler, Ward C.; Aleixo, Alexandre (July 20, 2018). "Phylogeny of map frogs, Boana semilineata species group, with a new Amazonian species (Anura: Hylidae)". South American Journal of Herpetology (Abstract). 13 (2): 150–169. doi:10.2994/SAJH-D-17-00037.1. S2CID 92542955.
