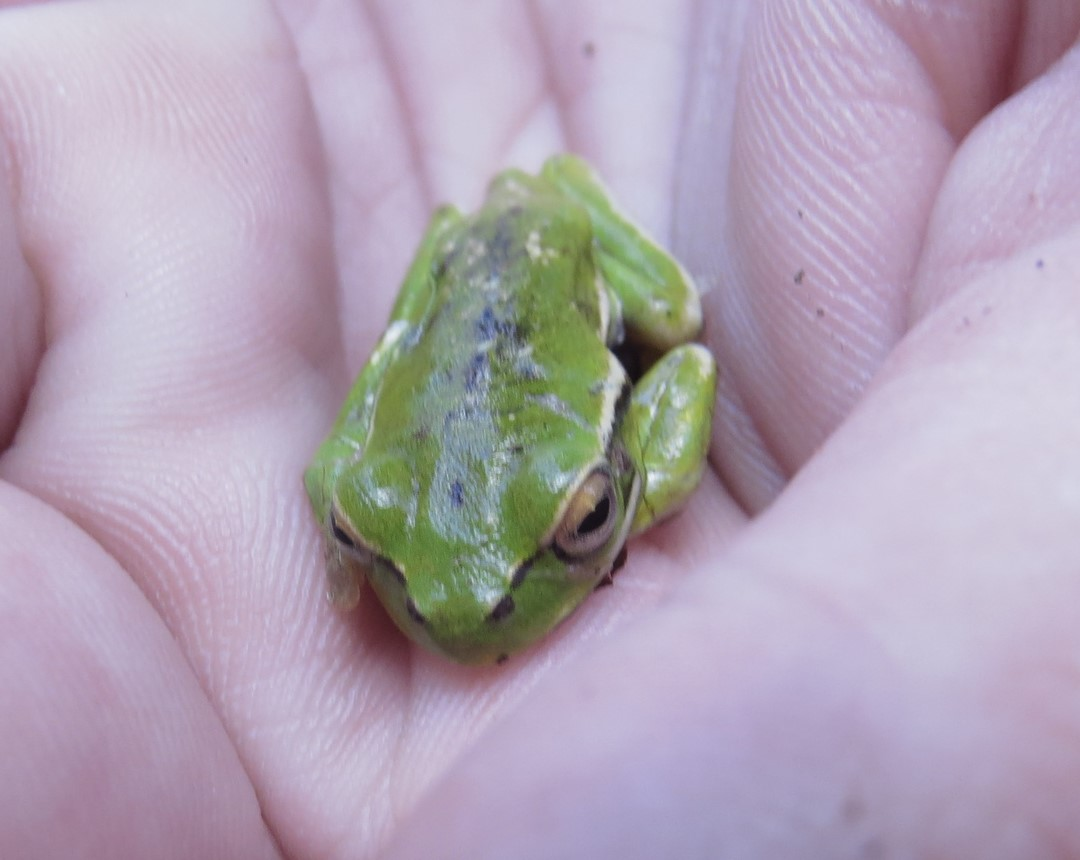

Conservation status
- Least Concern (IUCN 3.1)

Scientific classification
- Kingdom: Animalia
- Phylum: Chordata
- Class: Amphibia
- Order: Anura
- Family: Hylidae
- Genus: Boana
- Species: B. riojana

Binomial name
- Boana riojana (Koslowsky, 1895)

Synonyms
- Hyla riojana Koslowsky, 1895; Hypsiboas riojanus (Koslowsky, 1895); Hyla raddiana andina Müller, 1924; Hypsiboas andinus (Müller, 1924); Hyla pulchella cochabambae Gallardo, 1988 (nomen nudum); Hyla varelae Carrizo, 1992; Hypsiboas varelae (Carrizo, 1992); Boana varelae (Carrizo, 1992)

= Boana riojana =

Species of amphibian

Boana riojana is a species of frog in the family Hylidae. It is found in the eastern Andes and the Andean foothills between La Rioja Province in Argentina and northern Bolivia, and possibly further into adjacent Peru. Common name Carrizo's tree frog has been used when referring to the formerly recognized Boana varelae (Carrizo, 1992).

Boana riojana occurs at elevations of 1,650–3,400 m (5,410–11,150 ft) in the north and 500–1,640 m (1,640–5,380 ft) in the south. Ecological requirements of this species are largely unknown.
