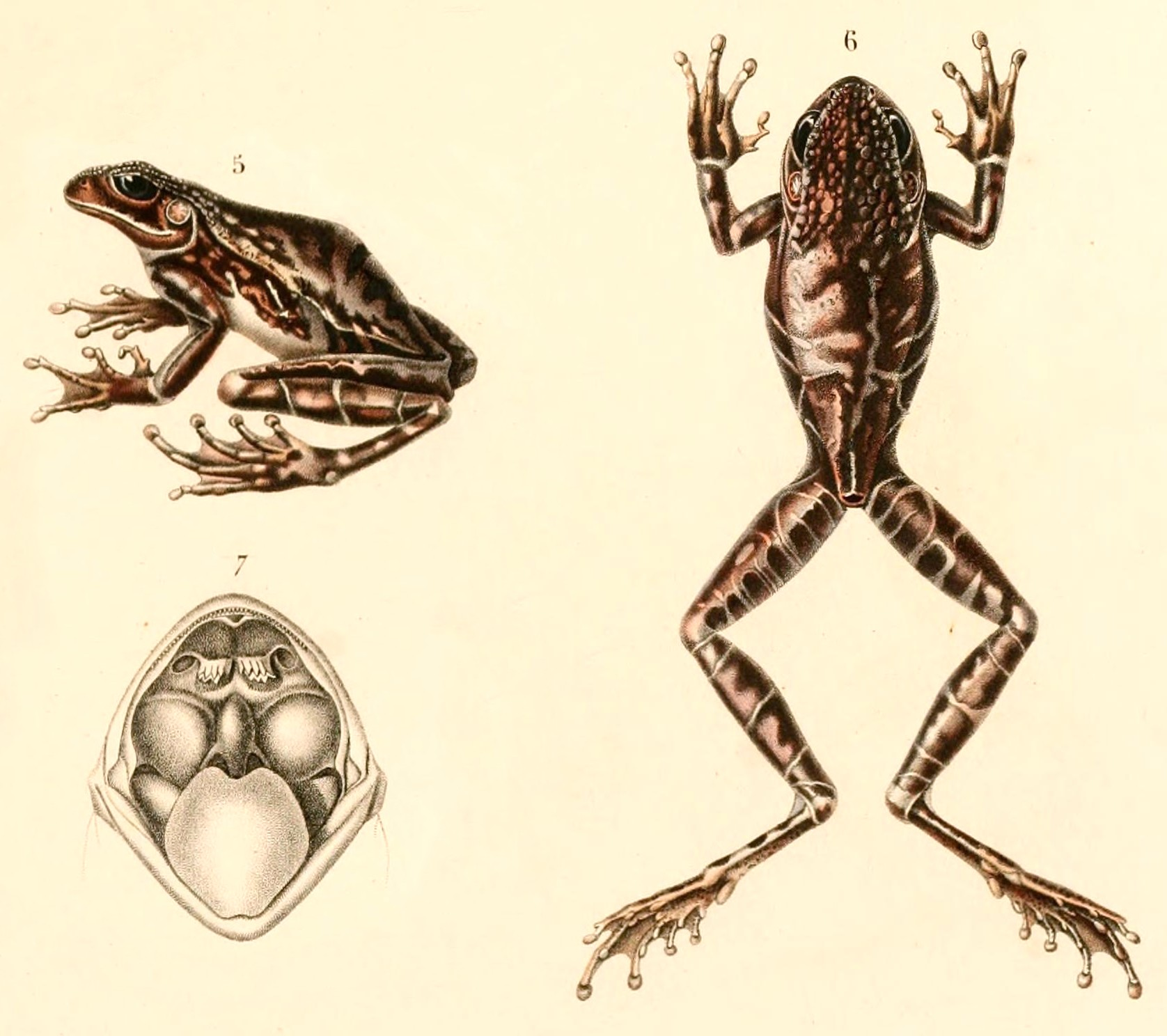

Conservation status
- Least Concern (IUCN 3.1)

Scientific classification
- Kingdom: Animalia
- Phylum: Chordata
- Class: Amphibia
- Order: Anura
- Family: Hylidae
- Genus: Boana
- Species: B. albonigra

Binomial name
- Boana albonigra (Nieden, 1923)

Synonyms
- Hyla ocapia Andersson, 1938; Hyla zebra Dumeril & Bibron, 1841; Hypsiboas alboniger (Nieden, 1923)

= White-black tree frog =

Species of amphibian

The white-black tree frog (Boana albonigra) is a species of frog in the family Hylidae endemic to Bolivia. Its natural habitats are subtropical or tropical moist montane forests, subtropical or tropical high-altitude shrubland, subtropical or tropical high-altitude grassland, and rivers. It is threatened by habitat loss.
