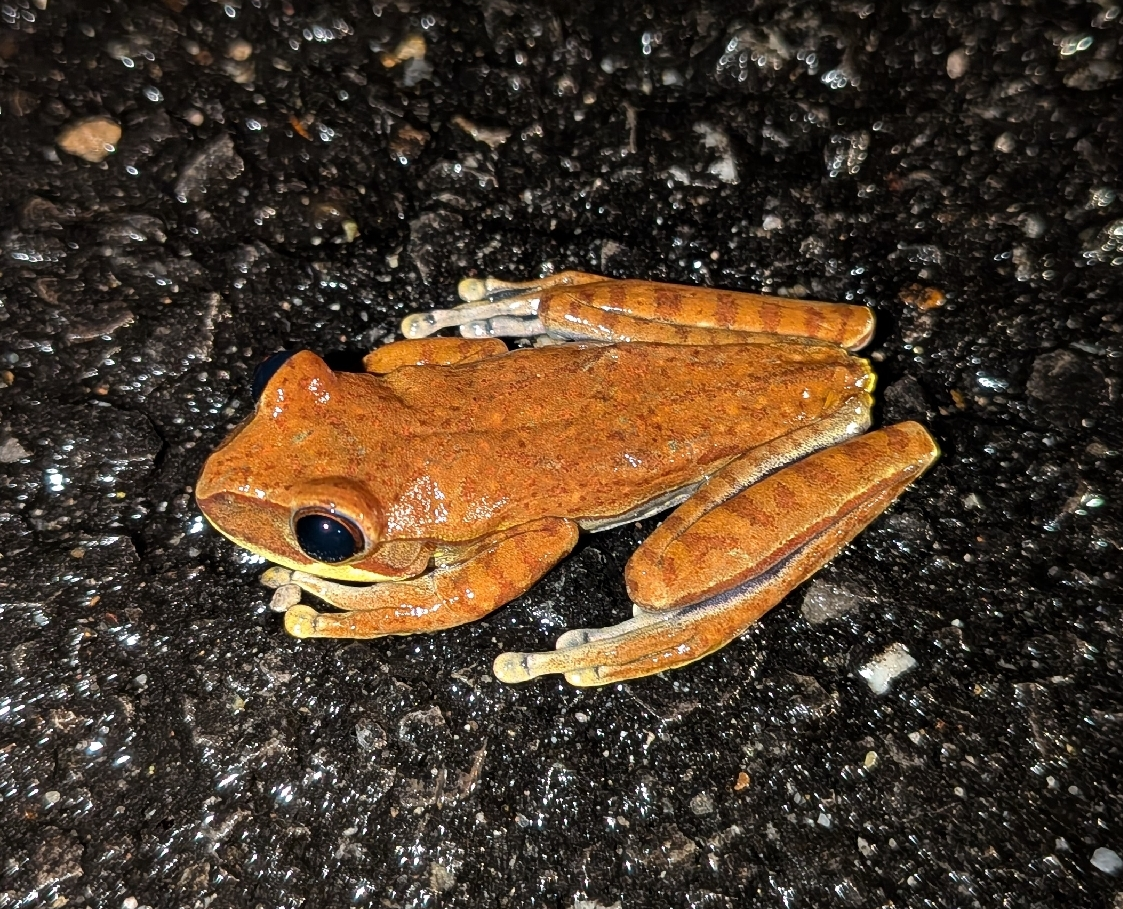

Conservation status
- Least Concern (IUCN 3.1)

Scientific classification
- Kingdom: Animalia
- Phylum: Chordata
- Class: Amphibia
- Order: Anura
- Family: Hylidae
- Genus: Boana
- Species: B. melanopleura

Binomial name
- Boana melanopleura (Boulenger, 1912)

Synonyms
- Hypsiboas melanopleura (Boulenger, 1912)

= Lower Andes tree frog =

Species of amphibian

The Lower Andes tree frog (Boana melanopleura) is a species of frog in the family Hylidae endemic to Peru. Its natural habitats are subtropical or tropical moist montane forests, rivers, freshwater marshes, and intermittent freshwater marshes.
