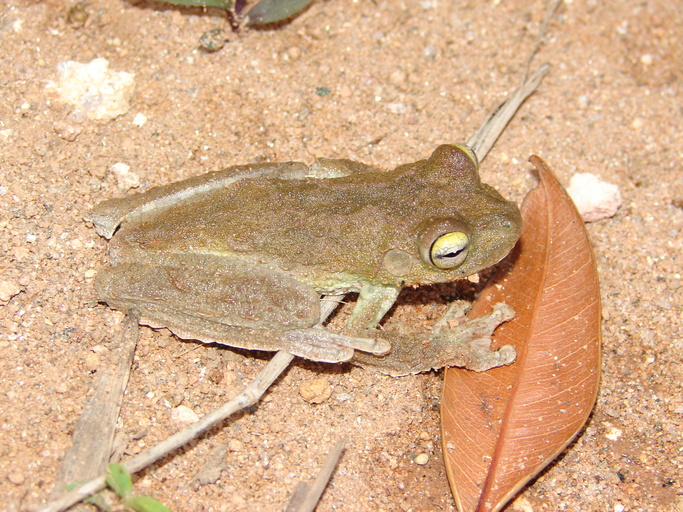

Conservation status
- Least Concern (IUCN 3.1)

Scientific classification
- Kingdom: Animalia
- Phylum: Chordata
- Class: Amphibia
- Order: Anura
- Family: Hylidae
- Genus: Boana
- Species: B. pardalis

Binomial name
- Boana pardalis (Spix, 1824)

Synonyms
- Hyla corticalis Burmeister, 1856; Hyla rubropunctata Lutz, 1973; Hypsiboas pardalis (Spix, 1824)

= Leopard tree frog =

Species of amphibian

The leopard tree frog (Boana pardalis) is a species of frog in the family Hylidae endemic to Brazil. Its natural habitats are subtropical or tropical dry forests, subtropical or tropical moist lowland forests, subtropical or tropical moist montane forests, freshwater marshes, intermittent freshwater marshes, plantations, rural gardens, heavily degraded former forests, ponds, and canals and ditches.
