= Hobbs' tree frog =

Conservation status
- Least Concern (IUCN 3.1)

Scientific classification
- Kingdom: Animalia
- Phylum: Chordata
- Class: Amphibia
- Order: Anura
- Family: Hylidae
- Genus: Boana
- Species: B. hobbsi

Binomial name
- Boana hobbsi (Cochran & Goin, 1970)

Synonyms
- Hypsiboas hobbsi (Cochran & Goin, 1970)

Species of amphibian

Hobbs' tree frog (Boana hobbsi) is a species of frog in the family Hylidae found in Colombia, Venezuela, and possibly Brazil. Its natural habitats are subtropical or tropical moist lowland forests and rivers. It is threatened by habitat loss.
