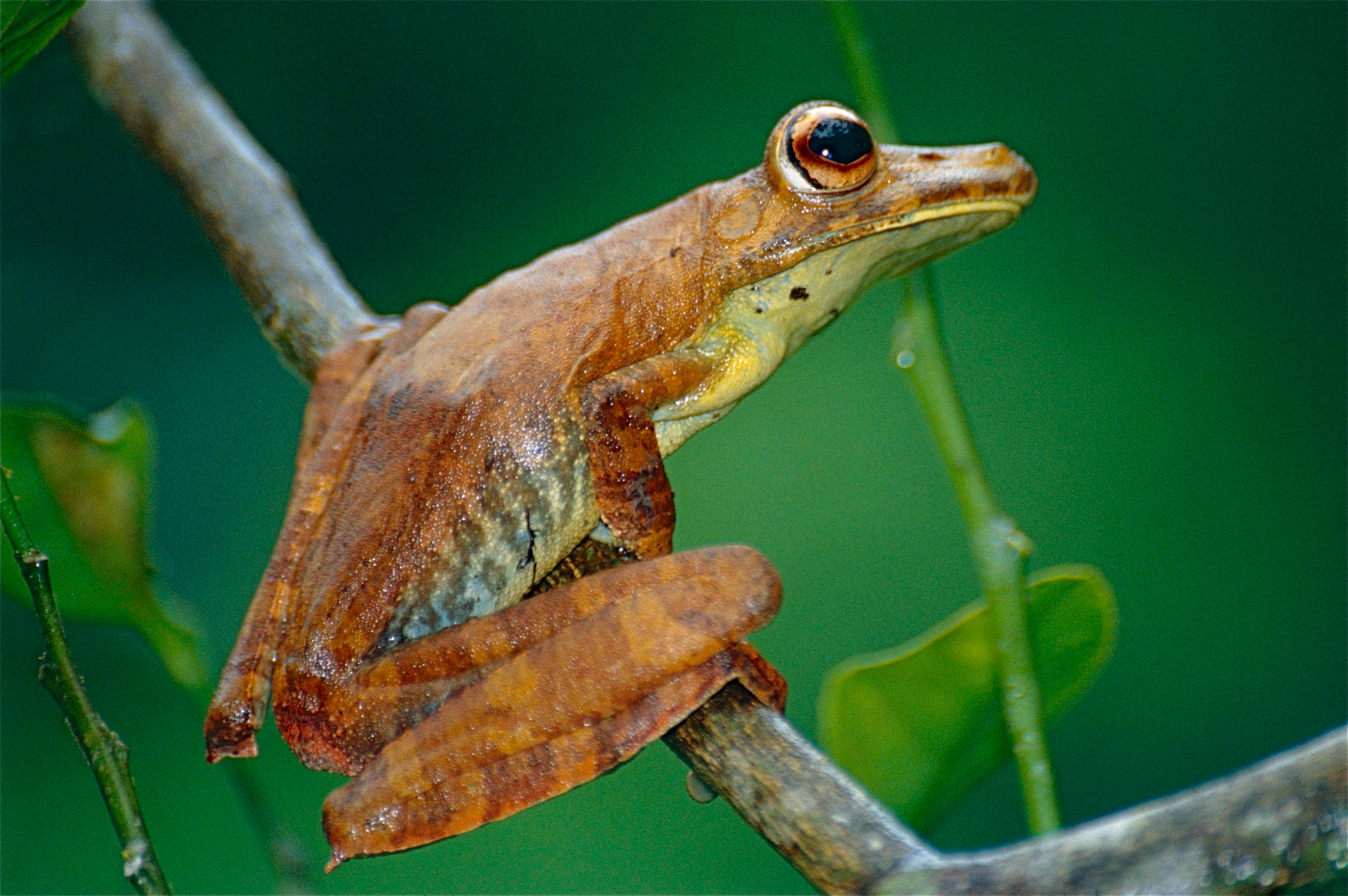
- Giant gladiator treefrog (Boana boans)

Scientific classification
- Kingdom: Animalia
- Phylum: Chordata
- Class: Amphibia
- Order: Anura
- Family: Hylidae
- Tribe: Cophomantini
- Genus: Boana; Gray, 1825

Type species
- Rana boans Linnaeus, 1758

Diversity
- About 90 species (see text)

Synonyms
- List: Hysaplesia Boie in Schlegel, 1826 (suppressed; ICZN Opinion 2223); Hypsiboas Wagler, 1830; Auletris Wagler, 1830; Lobipes Fitzinger, 1843 (preocc.); Hypsipsophus Fitzinger, 1843; Phyllobius Fitzinger, 1843 (preocc.); Centrotelma Burmeister, 1856; Hylomedusa Burmeister, 1856; Cinclidium Cope, 1867; Cophomantis Peters, 1870; Cincloscopus Cope, 1871

= Boana =

Genus of amphibians

Boana is a genus of frogs in the family Hylidae. They are commonly known as gladiator frogs, gladiator treefrogs or Wagler Neotropical treefrogs. These frogs are distributed in the tropical Central and South America from Nicaragua to Argentina, as well as in the Caribbean (Trinidad and Tobago and 1 species in Hispaniola).

This genus was resurrected following a major revision of Hylidae when some 70 species previously placed in the genus Hyla were moved to this genus. Since then, many new species have also been described.

== Species ==
As of April, 2020, there are 95 species recognised in this genus:

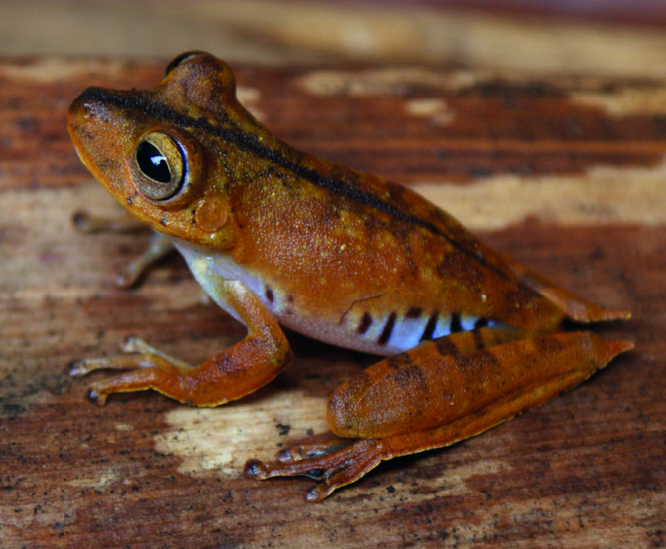
Boana calcarata

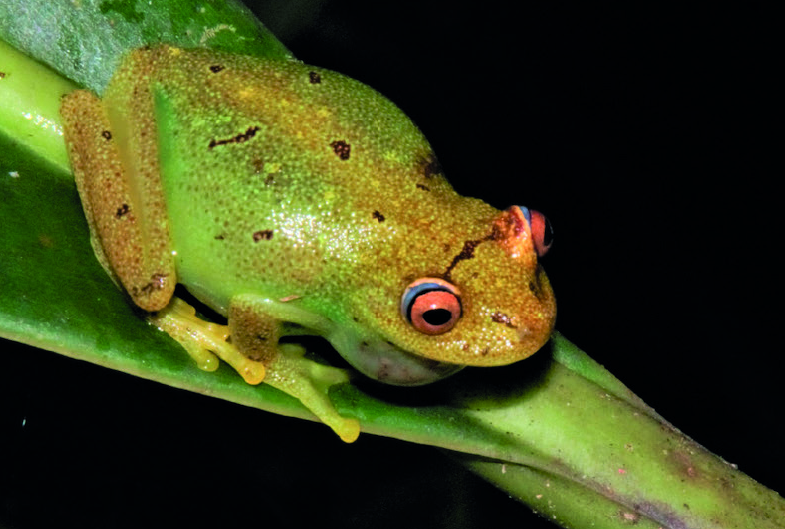
Boana cinerascens

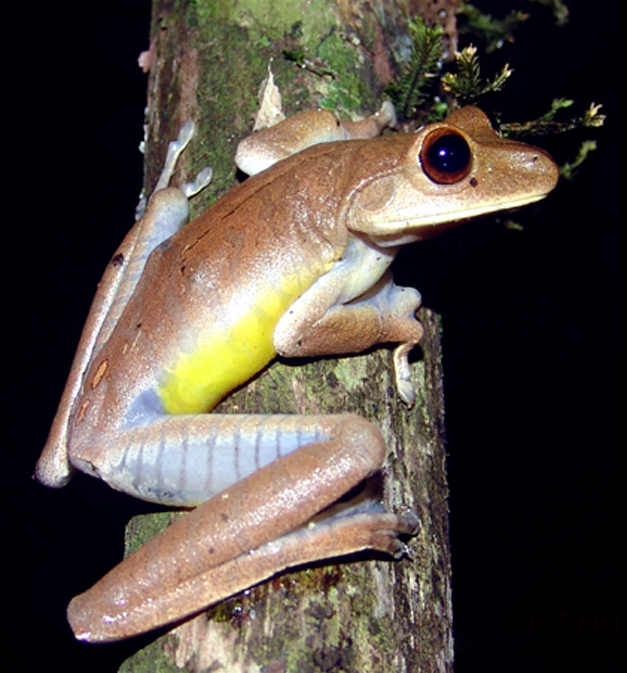
Boana faber

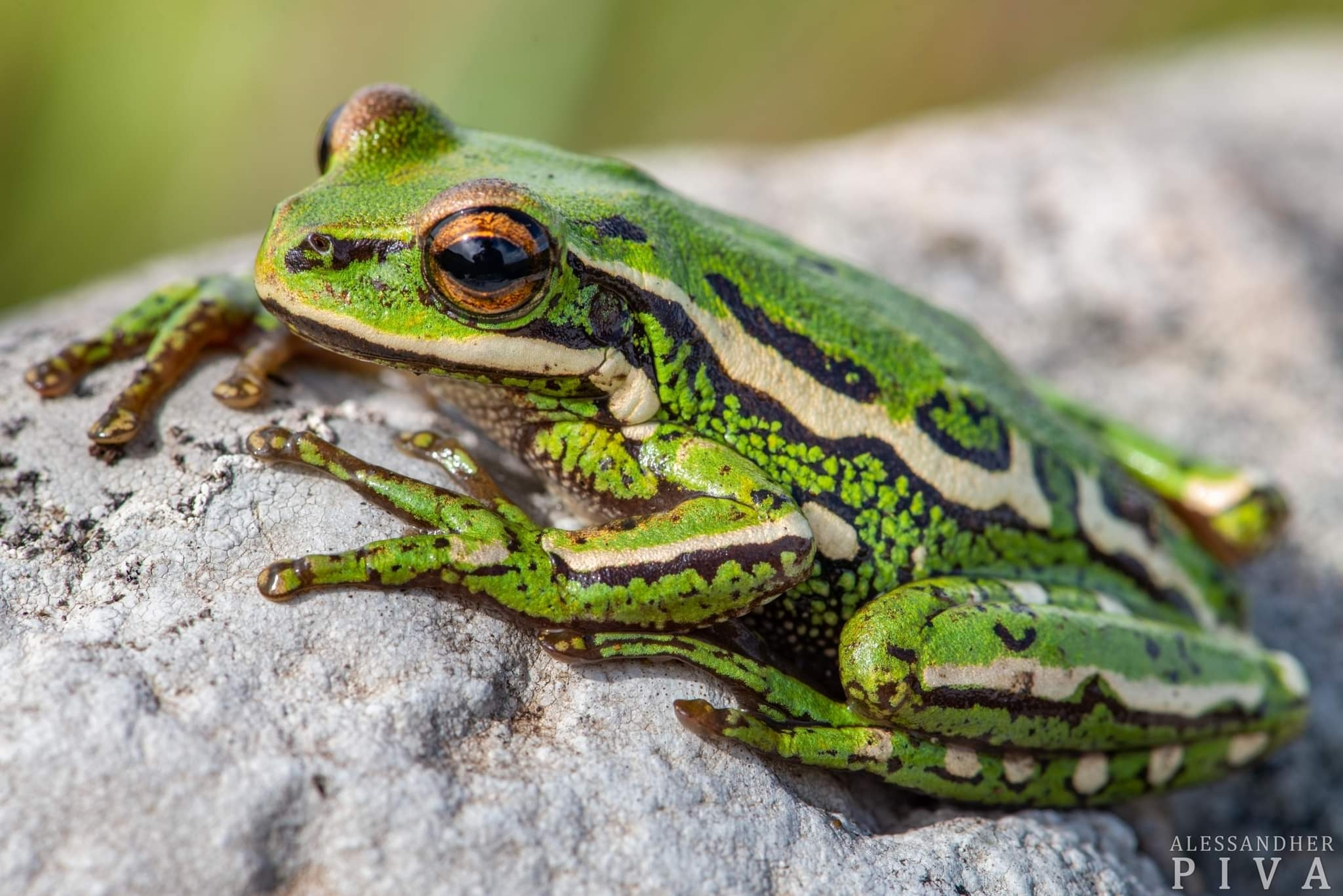
Boana joaquini

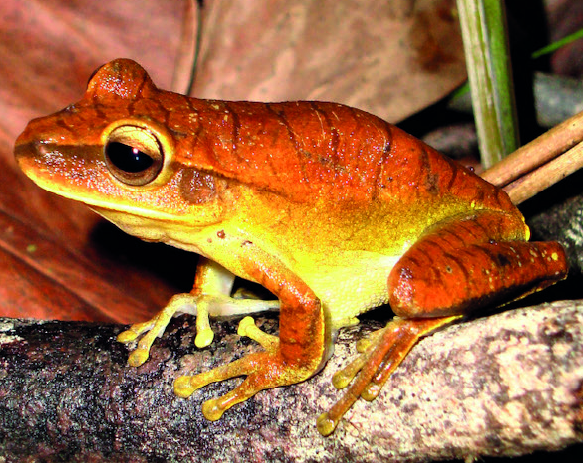
Boana multifasciata

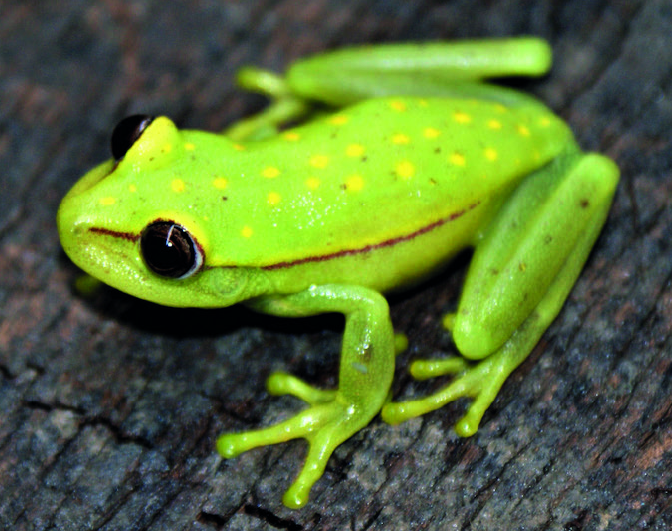
Boana punctata

- Boana aguilari (Lehr, Faivovich, and Jungfer, 2010)
- Boana albomarginata (Spix, 1824) – white-edged tree frog
- Boana albonigra (Nieden, 1923) – white-black tree frog
- Boana albopunctata (Spix, 1824) – white-spotted tree frog
- Boana alemani (Rivero, 1964) – Cagua tree frog
- Boana alfaroi (Caminer and Ron, 2014)
- Boana almendarizae (Caminer and Ron, 2014)
- Boana appendiculata (Boulenger, 1882)
- Boana atlantica (Caramaschi and Velosa, 1996)
- Boana balzani (Boulenger, 1898) – Yungas tree frog
- Boana bandeirantes (Caramaschi and Cruz, 2013)
- Boana beckeri (Caramaschi and Cruz, 2004)
- Boana benitezi (Rivero, 1961) – Benitez's tree frog
- Boana bischoffi (Boulenger, 1887) – Bischoff's tree frog
- Boana boans (Linnaeus, 1758) – rusty tree frog
- Boana botumirim (Caramaschi, Cruz, and Nascimento, 2009)
- Boana buriti (Caramaschi and Cruz, 1999)
- Boana caiapo (Pinheiro, Cintra, Valdujo, Silva, Martins, Silva, and Garcia, 2018)
- Boana caingua (Carrizo, 1991) – striped tree frog
- Boana caipora (Antunes, Faivovich, and Haddad, 2008)
- Boana calcarata (Troschel, 1848) – Troschel's tree frog or, convict tree frog
- Boana callipleura (Boulenger, 1902) – Charuplaya tree frog
- Boana cambui (Pinheiro, Pezzuti, Leite, Garcia, Haddad, and Faivovich, 2016)
- Boana cinerascens (Spix, 1824) – Demerara Falls tree frog
- Boana cipoensis (Lutz, 1968)
- Boana cordobae (Barrio, 1965)
- Boana crepitans (Wied-Neuwied, 1824) – emerald-eyed tree frog
- Boana curupi (Garcia, Faivovich, and Haddad, 2007)
- †Boana cymbalum (Bokermann, 1963) – Campo Grande tree frog
- Boana dentei (Bokermann, 1967) – Amapa tree frog
- Boana diabolica (Fouquet et al., 2016)
- Boana ericae (Caramaschi and Cruz, 2000)
- Boana exastis (Caramaschi and Rodrigues, 2003)
- Boana faber (Wied-Neuwied, 1821) – blacksmith tree frog
- Boana fasciata (Günther, 1858) – Gunther's banded tree frog
- Boana freicanecae (Carnaval and Peixoto, 2004)
- Boana fuentei (Goin and Goin, 1968) – Fuente's Powakka tree frog
- Boana geographica (Spix, 1824) – map tree frog
- Boana gladiator (Köhleret al., 2010)
- Boana goiana (Lutz, 1968)
- Boana guentheri (Boulenger, 1886) – Gunther's Brazilian tree frog
- Boana heilprini (Noble, 1923) – Los Bracitos tree frog
- Boana hobbsi (Cochran and Goin, 1970) – Hobbs' tree frog
- Boana hutchinsi (Pyburn and Hall, 1984) – Hutchins' tree frog
- Boana icamiaba (Pelosoet al., 2018)
- Boana jaguariaivensis (Caramaschi, Cruz, and Segalla, 2010)
- Boana jimenezi (Señaris and Ayarzagüena, 2006)
- Boana joaquini (Lutz, 1968)
- Boana lanciformis (Cope, 1871) – basin tree frog
- Boana latistriata (Caramaschi and Cruz, 2004)
- Boana lemai (Rivero, 1972) – Lema tree frog
- Boana leptolineata (Braun and Braun, 1977) – fine-lined tree frog
- Boana leucocheila (Caramaschi and Niemeyer, 2003)
- Boana lundii (Burmeister, 1856) – Usina tree frog
- Boana maculateralis (Caminer and Ron, 2014)
- Boana marginata (Boulenger, 1887) – Mundo Novo tree frog
- Boana marianitae (Carrizo, 1992) – Salta tree frog
- Boana melanopleura (Boulenger, 1912) – Lower Andes tree frog
- Boana microderma (Pyburn, 1977) – smallskin tree frog
- Boana multifasciata (Günther, 1859) – many-banded tree frog
- Boana nigra (Caminer and Ron, 2020)
- Boana nympha (Faivovich, Moravec, Cisneros-Heredia, and Köhler, 2006)
- Boana ornatissima (Noble, 1923) – ornate tree frog
- Boana palaestes (Duellman, De la Riva, and Wild, 1997)
- Boana paranaiba (Carvalho and Giaretta, 2010)
- Boana pardalis (Spix, 1824) – leopard tree frog
- Boana pellucens (Werner, 1901) – palmar tree frog
- Boana phaeopleura (Caramaschi and Cruz, 2000)
- Boana picturata (Boulenger, 1899) – Imbabura tree frog
- Boana platanera (Sulbarán, 2021) - Banana tree dwelling frog
- Boana poaju (Garcia, Peixoto, and Haddad, 2008)
- Boana polytaenia (Cope, 1870) – Cope's eastern Paraguay tree frog
- Boana pombali (Caramaschi, Pimenta, and Feio, 2004)
- Boana prasina (Burmeister, 1856) – Burmeister's tree frog
- Boana pugnax (Schmidt, 1857) – Chirique-Flusse tree frog
- Boana pulchella (Duméril and Bibron, 1841) – Montevideo tree frog
- Boana punctata (Schneider, 1799) – polka-dot tree frog
- Boana raniceps (Cope, 1862) – Chaco tree frog
- Boana rhythmica (Señaris and Ayarzagüena, 2002)
- Boana riojana (Koslowsky, 1895)
- Boana roraima (Duellman and Hoogmoed, 1992) – Hoogmoed's tree frog
- Boana rosenbergi (Boulenger, 1898) – Rosenberg's tree frog
- Boana rubracyla (Cochran and Goin, 1970) – Valle tree frog
- Boana rufitela (Fouquette, 1961) – Canal Zone tree frog
- Boana secedens (Lutz, 1963) – Barro Branco tree frog
- Boana semiguttata (Lutz, 1925) – speckled tree frog
- Boana semilineata (Spix, 1824)
- Boana sibleszi (Rivero, 1972) – La Escalera tree frog
- Boana steinbachi (Boulenger, 1905)
- Boana stellae (Kwet, 2008)
- Boana stenocephala (Caramaschi and Cruz, 1999)
- Boana tepuiana (Barrio-Amorós and Brewer-Carias, 2008)
- Boana tetete (Caminer and Ron, 2014)
- Boana ventrimaculata (Caminer and Ron, 2014)
- Boana wavrini (Parker, 1936) – Upper Orinoco tree frog
- Boana xerophylla (Duméril and Bibron, 1841)

In addition, Hyla palliata and Hypsiboas hypselops are included here as incertae sedis.
