= Boana cambui =

Scientific classification
- Kingdom: Animalia
- Phylum: Chordata
- Class: Amphibia
- Order: Anura
- Family: Hylidae
- Genus: Boana
- Species: B. cambui

Binomial name
- Boana cambui (Pinheiro, Pezzuti, Leite, Garcia, Haddad, and Faivovich, 2016)

Synonyms
- Hypsiboas cambui Pinheiro, Pezzuti, Leite, Garcia, Haddad, and Faivovich, 2016

Species of frog

Boana cambui is a frog in the family Hylidae. It is endemic to Brazil. Scientists have seen it 905 meters above sea level.

The adult male frog measures 26.3–32.8 mm long in snout-vent length. Scientists captured and measured one adult female frog, finding her to be 32.7 mm long. This frog's head is wider than the middle of its body.

This frog changes color over the course of the day. At night, this frog is dark brown in color with light brown spots and a light stripe down each side. During the day, this frog is lighter in color and the stripes and brown spots become less pronounced, and small red spots become visible.
