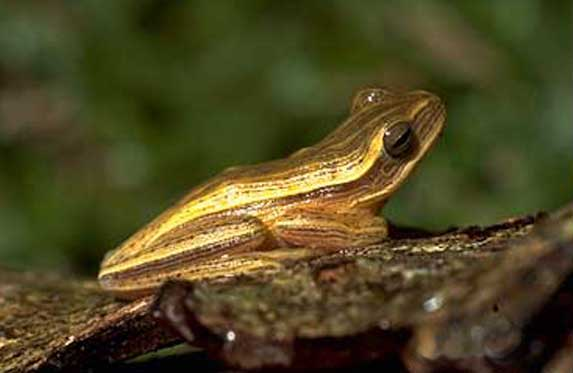

Conservation status
- Least Concern (IUCN 3.1)

Scientific classification
- Kingdom: Animalia
- Phylum: Chordata
- Class: Amphibia
- Order: Anura
- Family: Hylidae
- Genus: Boana
- Species: B. leptolineata

Binomial name
- Boana leptolineata (P. Braun & C. Braun, 1977)

Synonyms
- Hypsiboas leptolineatus

= Fine-lined tree frog =

Species of amphibian

The fine-lined tree frog (Boana leptolineata) is a species of frog in the family Hylidae endemic to Brazil. Its natural habitats are moist savanna, rivers, freshwater marshes, and intermittent freshwater marshes.
