= Boana ventrimaculata =

Scientific classification
- Kingdom: Animalia
- Phylum: Chordata
- Class: Amphibia
- Order: Anura
- Family: Hylidae
- Genus: Boana
- Species: B. ventrimaculata

Binomial name
- Boana ventrimaculata Caminer and Ron, 2020

Species of frog

Boana ventrimaculata, the Yasuní tree frog, is a frog in the family Hylidae, endemic to Ecuador and Brazil. Scientists have seen it between 64 and 1035 meters above sea level.

The adult male frog is measures 44.5 to 60.7 mm long in snout-vent length and the adult female frog about 72.9 to 90.5 mm long. They live in dry or flooded forests. This frog is the color of dark or light coffee.

This frog's name has the Latin word for "stain" in it, per the frog's resemblance to coffee stains.
