= Boana bandeirantes =

Scientific classification
- Kingdom: Animalia
- Phylum: Chordata
- Class: Amphibia
- Order: Anura
- Family: Hylidae
- Genus: Boana
- Species: B. bandeirantes

Binomial name
- Boana bandeirantes (Caramaschi and Cruz, 2013)

Synonyms
- Hypsiboas bandeirantes Caramaschi and Cruz, 2013

Species of frog

Boana bandeirantes is a frog in the family Hylidae, endemic to Brazil. Scientists have seen it only over 400 meters above sea level.

The adult male frog measures 27.1–29.1 mm in snout-vent length and one adult female frog has been reported to be 31.2 mm long. This frog has some webbing on the forefeet and more on the hind feet. The skin of the dorsum has four light brown stripes with darker brown in between. It has some white color on its face and two dark brown dorsolateral stripes from the snout over the eye down to the groin.
