= Boana aguilari =

Conservation status
- Least Concern (IUCN 3.1)

Scientific classification
- Kingdom: Animalia
- Phylum: Chordata
- Class: Amphibia
- Order: Anura
- Family: Hylidae
- Genus: Boana
- Species: B. aguilari

Binomial name
- Boana aguilari (Lehr, Faivovich, and Jungfer, 2010)

Synonyms
- Hypsiboas aguilari Lehr, Faivovich, and Jungfer, 2010

Species of frog

Boana aguilari is a frog in the family Hylidae, endemic to Peru. Scientists have seen it between 1225 and 2080 meters above sea level.

This frog lives in the Department of Pasco, in the eastern Andes Mountains.

The adult male frog measures 33.7–43.8 mm in snout-vent length and the adult female frog 33.7–50.0 mm. The adult male frog has hypertrophied forelimbs and bony spines, but it does not have the nuptial pad on its front feet seen in many other adult male frogs. This frog's head and back are beige in color with light olive marks. The throat is yellow-green in color. The belly and chest are white in color and the extremities are gray. The iris of the eye is light brown or pink with black reticulations.
