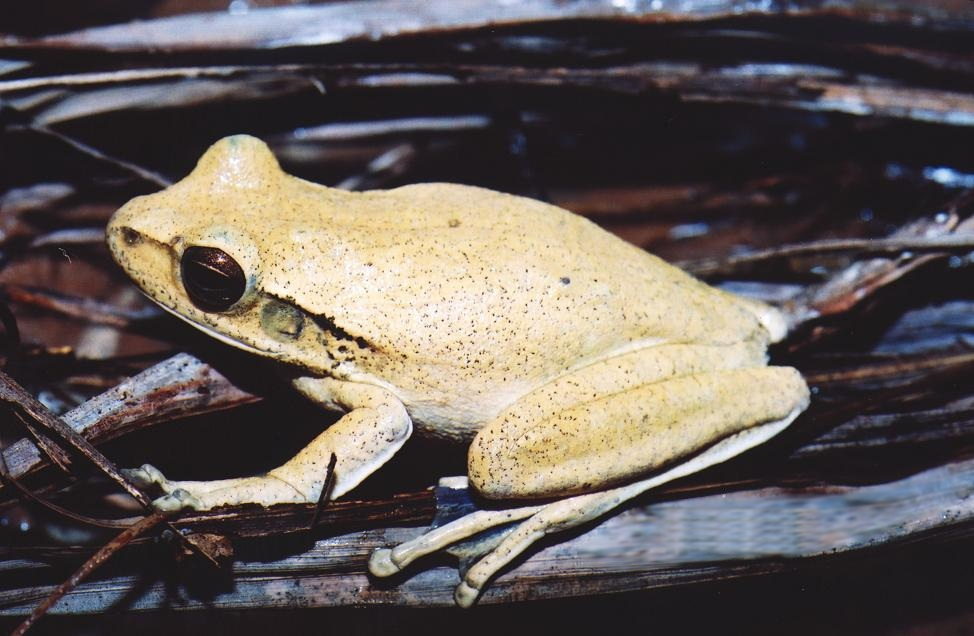

Conservation status
- Least Concern (IUCN 3.1)

Scientific classification
- Kingdom: Animalia
- Phylum: Chordata
- Class: Amphibia
- Order: Anura
- Family: Hylidae
- Genus: Boana
- Species: B. raniceps

Binomial name
- Boana raniceps Cope, 1862

Synonyms
- Hypsiboas raniceps (Cope, 1862); Hyla roeschmanni (DeGrys, 1938); Hypsiboas roeschmanni (DeGrys, 1938)

= Chaco tree frog =

Species of amphibian

The Chaco tree frog (Boana raniceps) is a frog species in the family Hylidae found in Argentina, Bolivia, Brazil, Colombia, French Guiana, Paraguay, and Venezuela.

Its natural habitats are subtropical or tropical dry forests, subtropical or tropical moist lowland forests, subtropical or tropical dry lowland grassland, rivers, swamps, freshwater lakes, intermittent freshwater lakes, freshwater marshes, intermittent freshwater marshes, urban areas, and heavily degraded former forests.

These organisms are considered general predators, meaning that they feed on a wide range of prey. They catch their prey using a sit-and-wait foraging technique. They tend to hunt high above the ground in the trees.
