= Hutchins' tree frog =

Conservation status
- Least Concern (IUCN 3.1)

Scientific classification
- Kingdom: Animalia
- Phylum: Chordata
- Class: Amphibia
- Order: Anura
- Family: Hylidae
- Genus: Boana
- Species: B. hutchinsi

Binomial name
- Boana hutchinsi (Pyburn & Hall, 1984)

Synonyms
- Hypsiboas hutchinsi (Pyburn & Hall, 1984)

Species of amphibian

Hutchins' tree frog (Boana hutchinsi) is a species of frog in the family Hylidae found in Colombia and possibly Brazil and Peru. Its natural habitats are subtropical or tropical moist lowland forests and rivers. It is threatened by habitat loss.
