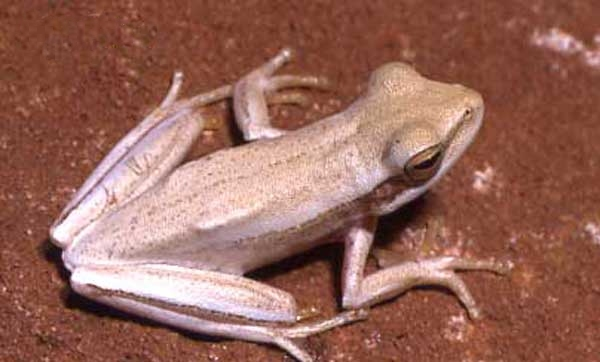

Conservation status
- Least Concern (IUCN 3.1)

Scientific classification
- Kingdom: Animalia
- Phylum: Chordata
- Class: Amphibia
- Order: Anura
- Family: Hylidae
- Genus: Boana
- Species: B. caingua

Binomial name
- Boana caingua (Carrizo, 1991)

Synonyms
- Hypsiboas caingua (Carrizo, 1991)

= Striped tree frog =

Species of amphibian

The striped tree frog (Boana caingua) is a species of frog in the family Hylidae found in Argentina, Brazil, and Paraguay. Its natural habitats are subtropical or tropical dry forests, subtropical or tropical moist lowland forests, subtropical or tropical dry lowland grassland, subtropical or tropical seasonally wet or flooded lowland grassland, rivers, swamps, heavily degraded former forests, and ponds. It is not considered threatened by the IUCN.
