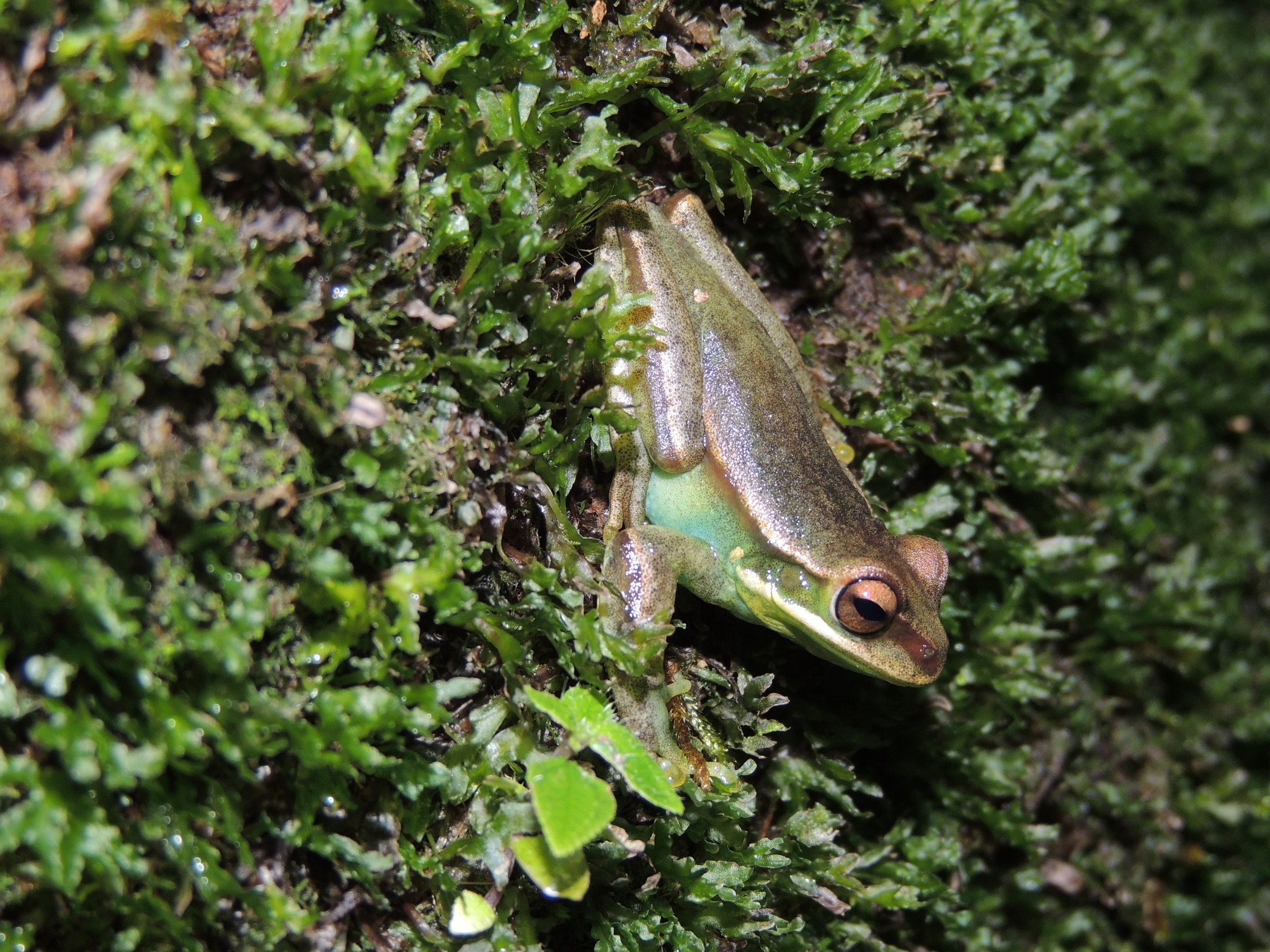

Conservation status
- Least Concern (IUCN 3.1)

Scientific classification
- Kingdom: Animalia
- Phylum: Chordata
- Class: Amphibia
- Order: Anura
- Family: Hylidae
- Genus: Boana
- Species: B. poaju

Binomial name
- Boana poaju (Garcia, Peixoto, and Haddad, 2008)

Synonyms
- Hypsiboas poaju Garcia, Peixoto, and Haddad, 2008

= Boana poaju =

Species of amphibian

Boana poaju is a frog in the family Hylidae. It is endemic to Brazil.

== Original description ==
- Antunes, André Pinassi; Faivovich, Julian; Haddad, Célio F. B. (2008). "A New Species of Hypsiboas from the Atlantic Forest of Southeastern Brazil (Amphibia: Anura: Hylidae)". Copeia: 179–190. doi:10.1643/CH-06-163. hdl:11336/113247. S2CID 84529246.
