= Smallskin tree frog =

Conservation status
- Least Concern (IUCN 3.1)

Scientific classification
- Kingdom: Animalia
- Phylum: Chordata
- Class: Amphibia
- Order: Anura
- Family: Hylidae
- Genus: Boana
- Species: B. microderma

Binomial name
- Boana microderma (Pyburn, 1977)

Synonyms
- Hypsiboas microderma (Pyburn, 1977)

Species of amphibian

The smallskin tree frog (Boana microderma) is a species of frog in the family Hylidae found in Brazil, Colombia, and Peru. Its natural habitats are subtropical or tropical moist lowland forests and rivers.
