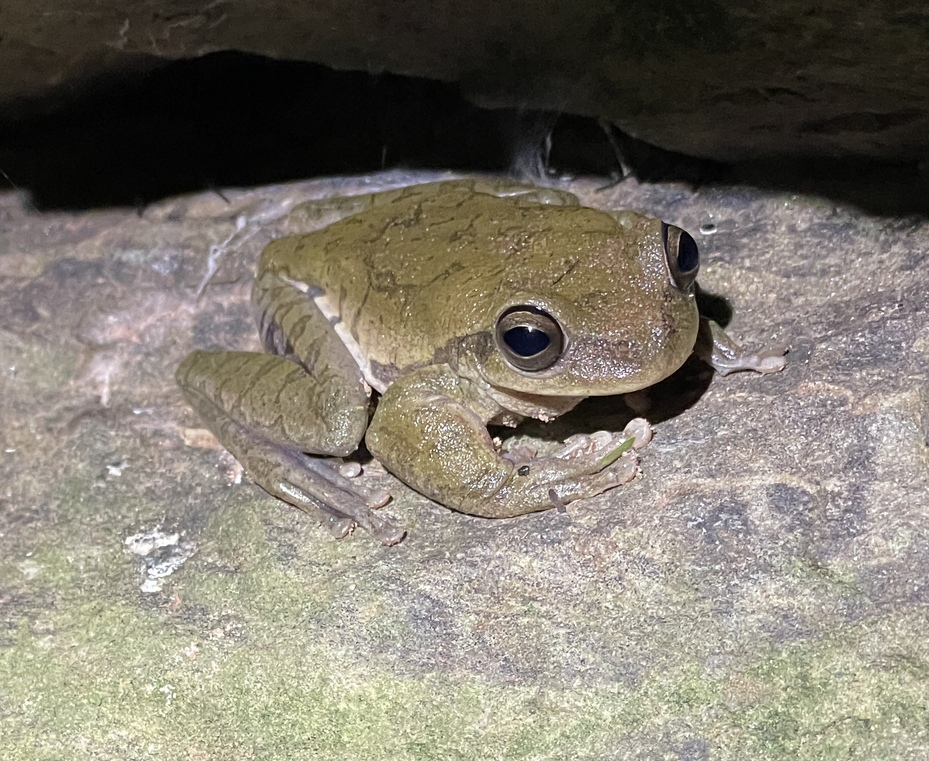

Conservation status
- Least Concern (IUCN 3.1)

Scientific classification
- Kingdom: Animalia
- Phylum: Chordata
- Class: Amphibia
- Order: Anura
- Family: Hylidae
- Genus: Boana
- Species: B. marianitae

Binomial name
- Boana marianitae (Carrizo, 1992)

Synonyms
- Hypsiboas marianitae (Carrizo, 1992)

= Salta tree frog =

Species of amphibian

The Salta tree frog (Boana marianitae) is a species of frog in the family Hylidae found in Argentina and Bolivia. Its natural habitats are subtropical or tropical dry forests, subtropical or tropical moist lowland forests, subtropical or tropical moist montane forests, rivers, freshwater marshes, and intermittent freshwater marshes. It is threatened by habitat loss.
