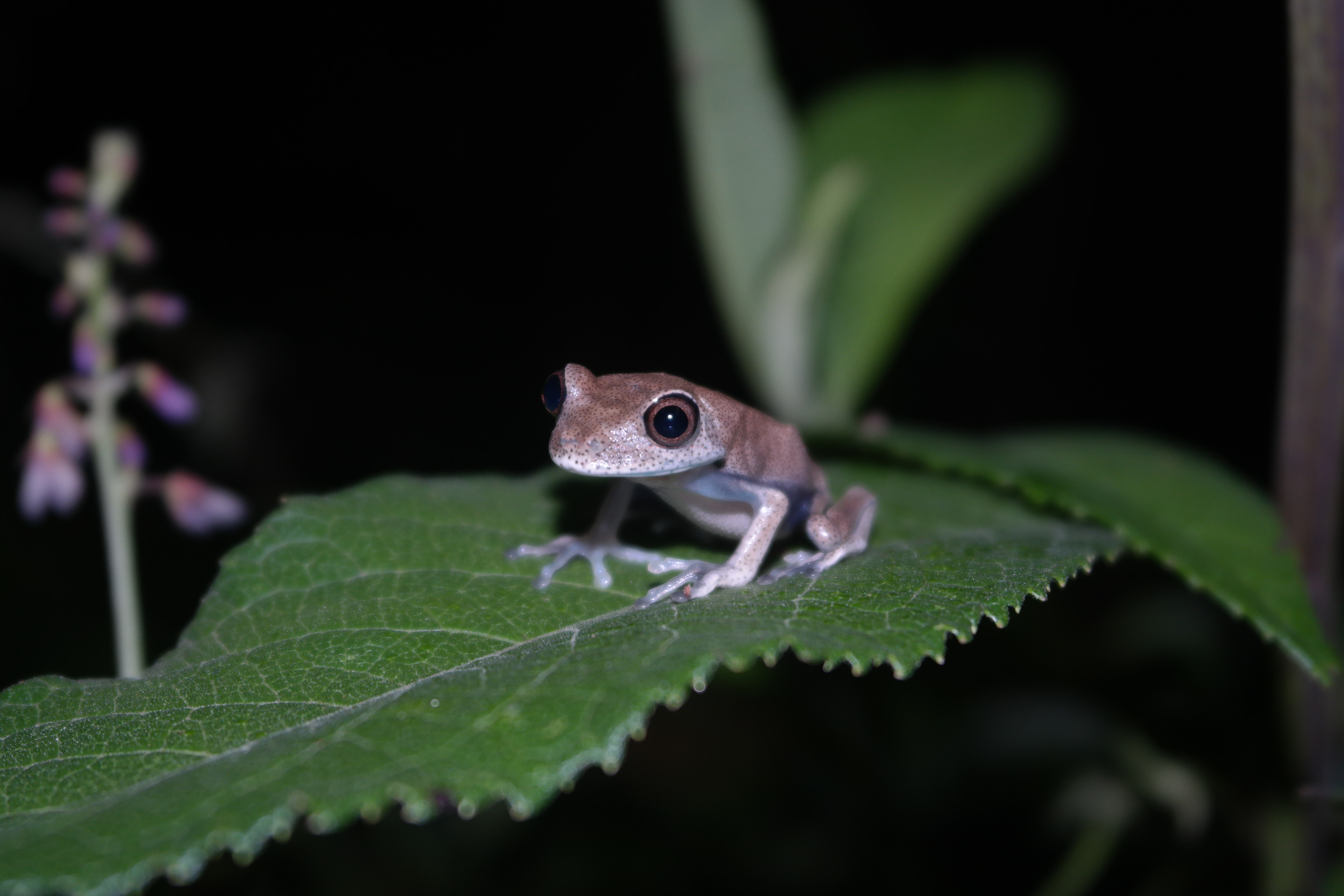

Conservation status
- Least Concern (IUCN 3.1)

Scientific classification
- Kingdom: Animalia
- Phylum: Chordata
- Class: Amphibia
- Order: Anura
- Family: Hylidae
- Genus: Boana
- Species: B. semilineata

Binomial name
- Boana semilineata (Spix, 1824)

Synonyms
- Hypsiboas semilineatus (Spix, 1824)

= Boana semilineata =

Species of frog

Boana semilineata is a species of frog in the family Hylidae that is endemic to Brazil. Its natural habitats are subtropical or tropical moist lowland forests, subtropical or tropical moist shrubland, freshwater lakes, freshwater marshes, intermittent freshwater marshes, pastureland, heavily degraded former forests, water storage areas, and ponds.
