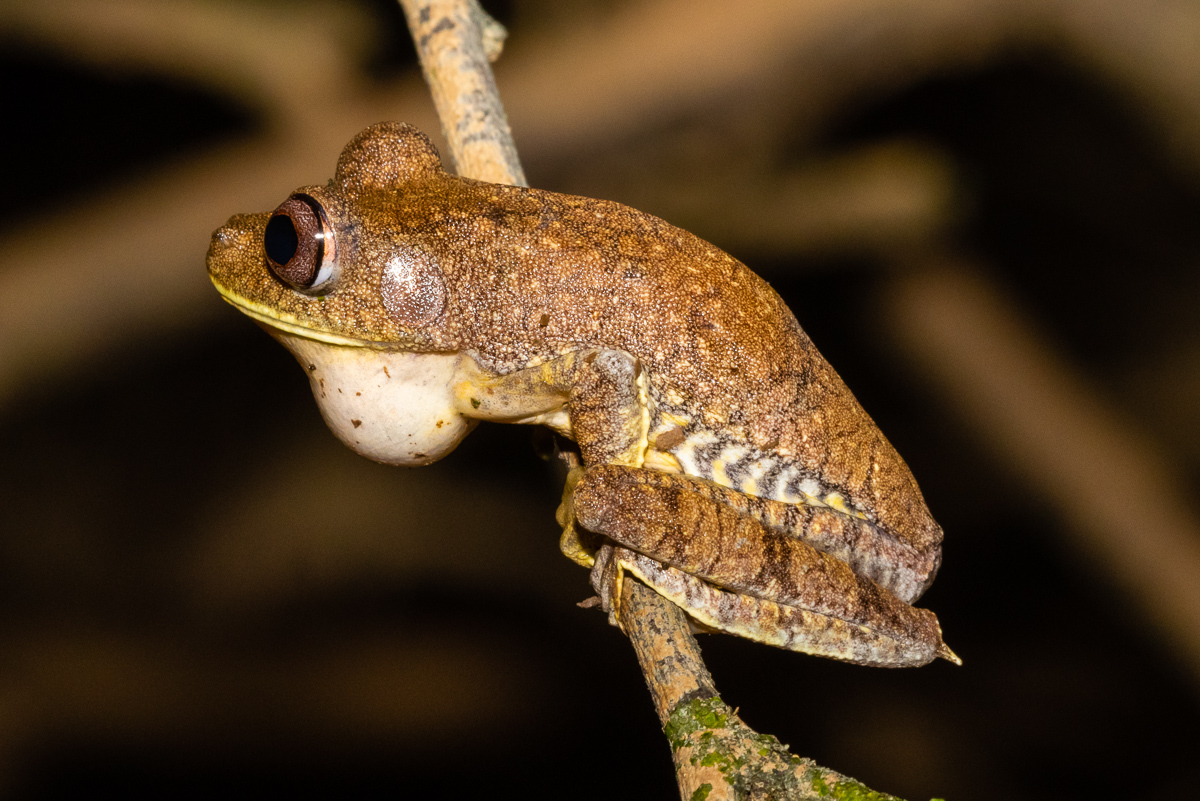

Scientific classification
- Kingdom: Animalia
- Phylum: Chordata
- Class: Amphibia
- Order: Anura
- Family: Hylidae
- Genus: Boana
- Species: B. appendiculata

Binomial name
- Boana appendiculata (Boulenger, 1882)

Synonyms
- Hyla appendiculata Boulenger, 1882; Hyla punctatissima appendiculata Parker, 1933; Boana appendiculata Caminer and Ron, 2020

= Canelos tree frog =

Species of amphibian

The Canelos tree frog (Boana appendiculata) is a frog in the family Hylidae. It is endemic to Brazil, Ecuador, and Colombia. Scientists have seen it between 14 and 1050 meters above sea level.

The adult male frog is 38.5 to 51.9 mm long in snout-vent length. The adult female frog is 53.5 to 72.6 mm long. The skin on the ventrum is coffee-colored, and the dorsum is yellow or orange.

This frog lives in primary and secondary forests, pantanals, artificial open areas, and partially flooded areas. Their presence in secondary forest and human-altered habitats suggests they are somewhat resilient in the face of disturbance. They prefer streams with fast-moving water.

The species was originally synonymized with the map tree frog (Boana geographica) but was resurrected as a species in 2020.
