= Scinax castroviejoi =

Conservation status
- Least Concern (IUCN 3.1)

Scientific classification
- Kingdom: Animalia
- Phylum: Chordata
- Class: Amphibia
- Order: Anura
- Family: Hylidae
- Genus: Scinax
- Species: S. castroviejoi

Binomial name
- Scinax castroviejoi De la Riva, 1993

Species of frog

Scinax castroviejoi is a species of frog in the family Hylidae. It is found in valleys of the Eastern Andes in southern Bolivia, and controversially, in northern Argentina. Its type locality is Laguna de Bermejo. It is similar to Scinax fuscovarius but differs in call characteristics. The specific name castroviejoi honors Javier Castroviejo Bolívar, a Spanish zoologist.

== Taxonomy and systematics ==
Scinax castroviejoi was described based on eight specimens (holotype and seven paratypes) collected both from Laguna de Bermejo, and an additional three paratypes from Arroyo Los Naranjos in Provincia de Jujuy, Argentina. It is intermediate between Scinax fuscovarius and Scinax nasicus. Reliable identification cannot be based on morphology alone, as was done in the original species description for the Argentinian types. A later survey in the Jujuy location did not find Scinax castroviejoi but only Scinax fuscovarius. Presence of Scinax castroviejoi in Argentina is plausible but remains uncertain.

== Description ==
Adult males in the type series measure on average 42 mm (1.7 in)in snout–vent length (SVL); the holotype is 45 mm (1.8 in) SVL. The only female was collected from collected from the Jujuy location and measures 49 mm (1.9 in). The body is moderately robust. The tympanum is distinct; the supratympanic fold is short but covers the upper part of the tympanum. Both fingers and toes bear relatively large discs. The fingers are basally webbed whereas the toes are about two thirds webbed. The dorsum varies from uniform beige to dark greenish-brown. Distinct spots may be present. About half of the males have two distinct X-shaped spots but in the rest they only slightly evident or nearly absent. The venter is creamy yellow and the vocal sac is yellow. The iris is bronze-brown.

The male advertisement call is a biphasic, noisy, strong note lasting about 0.06 seconds and repeated about 87 times per minute.

== Habitat and conservation ==
Scinax castroviejoi occurs in open areas in inter-Andean valleys, montane Tucumano-Bolivian forest, and Yungas forest. It is a locally common, arboreal species. Males have been found calling at sunset from the ground or perching on vegetation surrounding a lake. It has also been recorded next to ponds or water tanks on emergent vegetation. It is threatened by habitat loss. However, it is considered "least concern".
