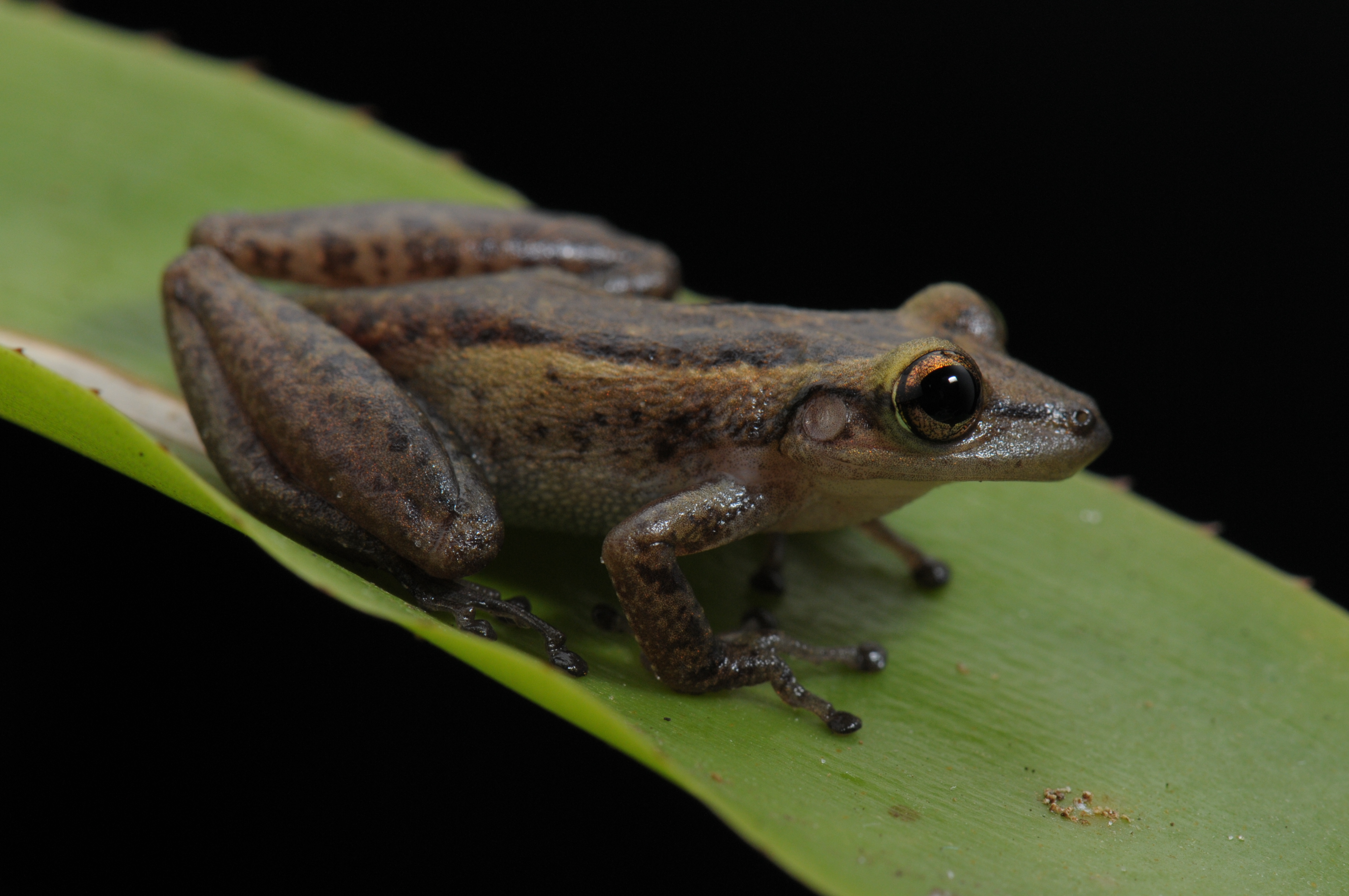

Scientific classification
- Kingdom: Animalia
- Phylum: Chordata
- Class: Amphibia
- Order: Anura
- Family: Hylidae
- Genus: Scinax
- Species: S. tymbamirim

Binomial name
- Scinax tymbamirim Nunes, Kwet, and Pombal, 2012

Synonyms
- Hyla fuscomarginata non A. Lutz, 1925; Hyla altera Lutz, 1973; Hyla rubra altera Braun and Braun, 1980; Scinax spec. nov. Kwet and Di-Bernardo, 1999; Scinax sp. Kwet, 2001; Scinax cf. alter Rocha et al., 2008; Scinax sp. aff. alter Kwet et al., 2010; Scinax sp. II (aff. alter, small form) Kwet and Márquez 2010

= Scinax tymbamirim =

Species of frog

Scinax tymbamirim is a frog in the family Hylidae. It is endemic to Brazil.

== Appearance ==
The adult male frog is 20.6 to 27.4 mm long in snout-vent length and the adult female frog 22.3 to 31.2 mm.

This frog is brown or orange-brown in color on the dorsum. It has interrupted white stripes down its sides. There is a five-sided intraocular mark, lined with yellow. There are dark brown bars across all the front and hind legs. Its ventrum is beige in color. This frog has vomerine teeth in its jaw. It has disks on its toes for climbing.

== Home ==
This frog lives in coastal lowlands up to hills and highlands 1000 meters above sea level.

== Name ==
The scientific name of this frog comes from the Tupí-guarani language. Tymba means "animal" and mirim means "small." The scientists named this frog "small animal" because it is smaller that Scinax alter.
