= Cynocephalus (disambiguation) =

Cynocephalus may refer to:

- Cynocephaly, a Greek word, literally meaning "dog-head", for a number of mythical creatures with the heads or faces of dogs
- Philippine flying lemur (Cynocephalus volans), one of two species of flying lemurs
- Yellow baboon (Papio cynocephalus), a baboon from the Old World monkey family
- Kinda baboon (Papio cynocephalus kindae), a species of baboon
- Thylacine (Thylacinus cynocephalus), commonly known as the Tasmanian tiger
- Rainette nébuleuse (Scinax cynocephalus), a species of frog in the family Hylidae
