= Scinax cretatus =

Conservation status
- Least Concern (IUCN 3.1)

Scientific classification
- Kingdom: Animalia
- Phylum: Chordata
- Class: Amphibia
- Order: Anura
- Family: Hylidae
- Genus: Scinax
- Species: S. cretatus

Binomial name
- Scinax cretatus Nunes and Pombal, 2011

Species of frog

Scinax cretatus is a frog in the family Hylidae endemic to Brazil.

This frog lives near the edges of coastal forests and lakes.

The adult male frog measures 25.8 to 34.7 mm in snout-vent length and the adult female frog 29.2 to 32.5 mm. The skin on the dorsum is dark brown with white dorsolateral stripes.
