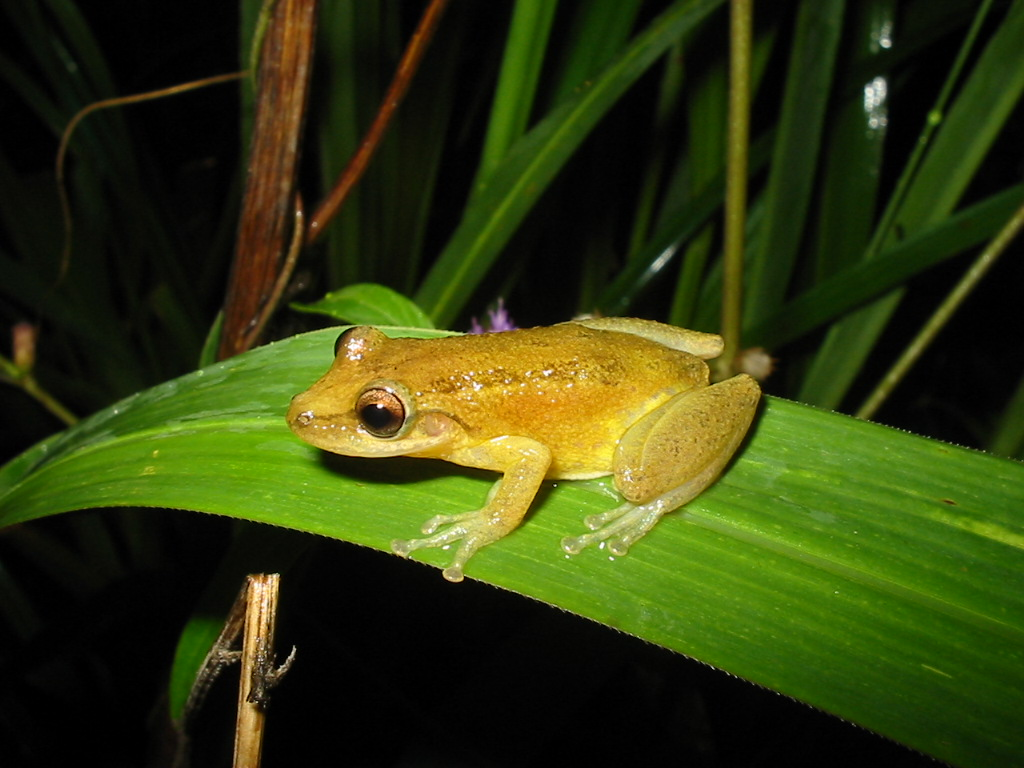

Conservation status
- Least Concern (IUCN 3.1)

Scientific classification
- Kingdom: Animalia
- Phylum: Chordata
- Class: Amphibia
- Order: Anura
- Family: Hylidae
- Genus: Scinax
- Species: S. fuscomarginatus

Binomial name
- Scinax fuscomarginatus (A. Lutz, 1925)

Synonyms
- Hyla fuscomarginata Lutz, 1925; Hyla parkeri Gaige, 1929; Ololygon fuscomarginata (Lutz, 1925); Ololygon parkeri (Gaige, 1929); Ololygon trilineata Hoogmoed and Gorzula, 1979; Scinax fuscomarginata (Lutz, 1925); Scinax parkeri (Gaige, 1929); Scinax trilineatus (Hoogmoed and Gorzula, 1979); Scinax lutzorum Woitovicz-Cardoso and Pombal, 2010; Scinax pusillus Pombal, Bilate, Gambale, Signorelli, and Bastos, 2011

= Scinax fuscomarginatus =

Species of frog

Scinax fuscomarginatus is a species of frog in the family Hylidae. It is found in northwestern Argentina, Paraguay, eastern Bolivia, southern, central, and eastern Brazil, and in scattered localities in the lowlands of eastern Venezuela and savannas of Guyana and southern Suriname as well as adjacent Brazil. As currently defined, it is one of the most widespread Neotropical frogs; the northernmost records refer to what was formerly recognized as Scinax trilineatus. Common name brown-bordered snouted treefrog has been coined for this species.

== Taxonomy ==
Scinax fuscomarginatus, as currently defined, consists of what until 2014 were recognized as separate but morphologically similar species. Based on genetic data and the lack of morphological or advertisement call characteristics that could separate the species, Scinax parkeri, Scinax trilineatus, Scinax lutzorum, and Scinax pusillus are now regarded as synonyms of Scinax fuscomarginatus.

== Description ==
Adult males measure 16–27 mm (0.6–1.1 in) in snout–vent length. The snout is subelliptical in dorsal view. The head is longer than it is wide. The tympanum is small and not very distinct; its upper part is hidden by the supra-tympanic fold. The fingers are short and bear elliptical discs; there is some reduced webbing. The toes are slender and bear elliptical discs; the degree of webbing varies but is more developed than in fingers. The dorsum (in preservative) is light brown with a pattern of brown dorso-lateral stripes in combination with a median line and an inter-ocular stripe that show great variability among individuals. The chest and the belly are immaculate or finely pointed.

Males have a large, subgular vocal sac. The male advertisement call a single multi-pulsed note with modulated frequency. The note duration is 0.3–0.9 seconds and the dominant frequency is about 3780 Hz (range 2960–4590 Hz).

== Habitat and conservation ==
Scinax fuscomarginatus occurs in open habitats of the Pantanal, Cerrado, Humid Chaco, Beni savanna, and Chiquitano dry forests, as well as in open habitat enclaves in the Atlantic and Amazon forests. It occurs at least up to 1,000 m (3,300 ft) above sea level.

The IUCN assessment of the species from 2004 predates the major taxonomic revision that lead to recognizing a more widely distributed species than before. At the time of the IUCN assessment, no major threats to the species could be identified.
