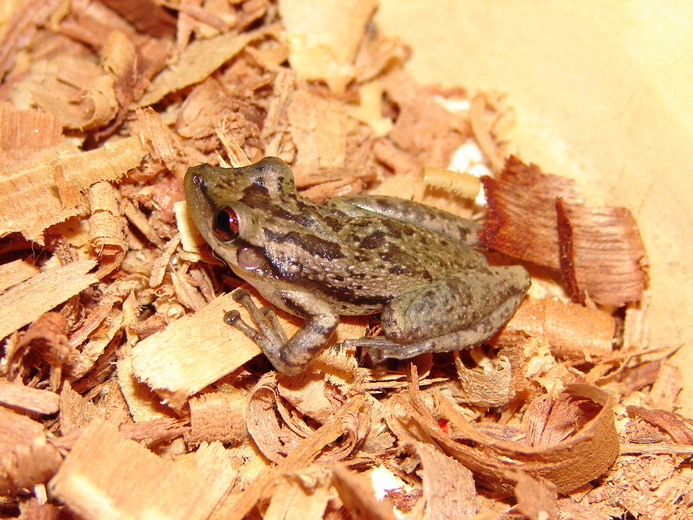

Conservation status
- Least Concern (IUCN 3.1)

Scientific classification
- Kingdom: Animalia
- Phylum: Chordata
- Class: Amphibia
- Order: Anura
- Family: Hylidae
- Genus: Scinax
- Species: S. cuspidatus

Binomial name
- Scinax cuspidatus (A. Lutz, 1925)

= Scinax cuspidatus =

Species of frog

Scinax cuspidatus is a species of frog in the family Hylidae. It is endemic to Brazil. Its natural habitats are subtropical or tropical moist lowland forests, subtropical or tropical moist shrubland, subtropical or tropical dry lowland grassland, freshwater marshes, intermittent freshwater marshes, rocky areas, heavily degraded former forest, and ponds. It is threatened by habitat loss.
