= Scinax oreites =

Conservation status
- Least Concern (IUCN 3.1)

Scientific classification
- Kingdom: Animalia
- Phylum: Chordata
- Class: Amphibia
- Order: Anura
- Family: Hylidae
- Genus: Scinax
- Species: S. oreites

Binomial name
- Scinax oreites Duellman & Wiens, 1993

Species of frog

Scinax oreites is a species of frog in the family Hylidae. It is endemic to Peru. Its natural habitats are subtropical or tropical moist montane forests, swamps, intermittent freshwater lakes, and freshwater marshes. It is threatened by habitat loss.
