= Scinax strussmannae =

Scientific classification
- Kingdom: Animalia
- Phylum: Chordata
- Class: Amphibia
- Order: Anura
- Family: Hylidae
- Genus: Scinax
- Species: S. strussmannae

Binomial name
- Scinax strussmannae Ferrão, Moravec, Kaefer, Fraga, and Lima, 2018

Species of frog

Scinax strussmannae, or Strüssmann's snouted tree frog, is a frog in the family Hylidae, endemic to dense rainforests in Brazil. It has been found in Nacentes do Lago Jari National Park.

The adult male frog measures 20.2 to 22.5 mm in snout-vent length. The skin on the dorsum is yellow to bronze in color with small spots on the back and legs. There is a red stripe in the iris of its eye. The male frog has two different advertisement calls.
