= Scinax camposseabrai =

Conservation status
- Data Deficient (IUCN 3.1)

Scientific classification
- Kingdom: Animalia
- Phylum: Chordata
- Class: Amphibia
- Order: Anura
- Family: Hylidae
- Genus: Scinax
- Species: S. camposseabrai

Binomial name
- Scinax camposseabrai (Bokermann, 1968)

Synonyms
- Hyla camposseabrai Bokermann, 1966; Hyla camposseabrai Bokermann, 1968; Hyla x-signata camposseabrai Lutz, 1973; Ololygon x-signata camposseabrai Fouquette and Delahoussaye, 1977; Scinax camposseabrai Caramaschi and Cardoso, 2006

Species of frog

Scinax camposseabrai is a frog in the family Hylidae. It is endemic to Brazil.
