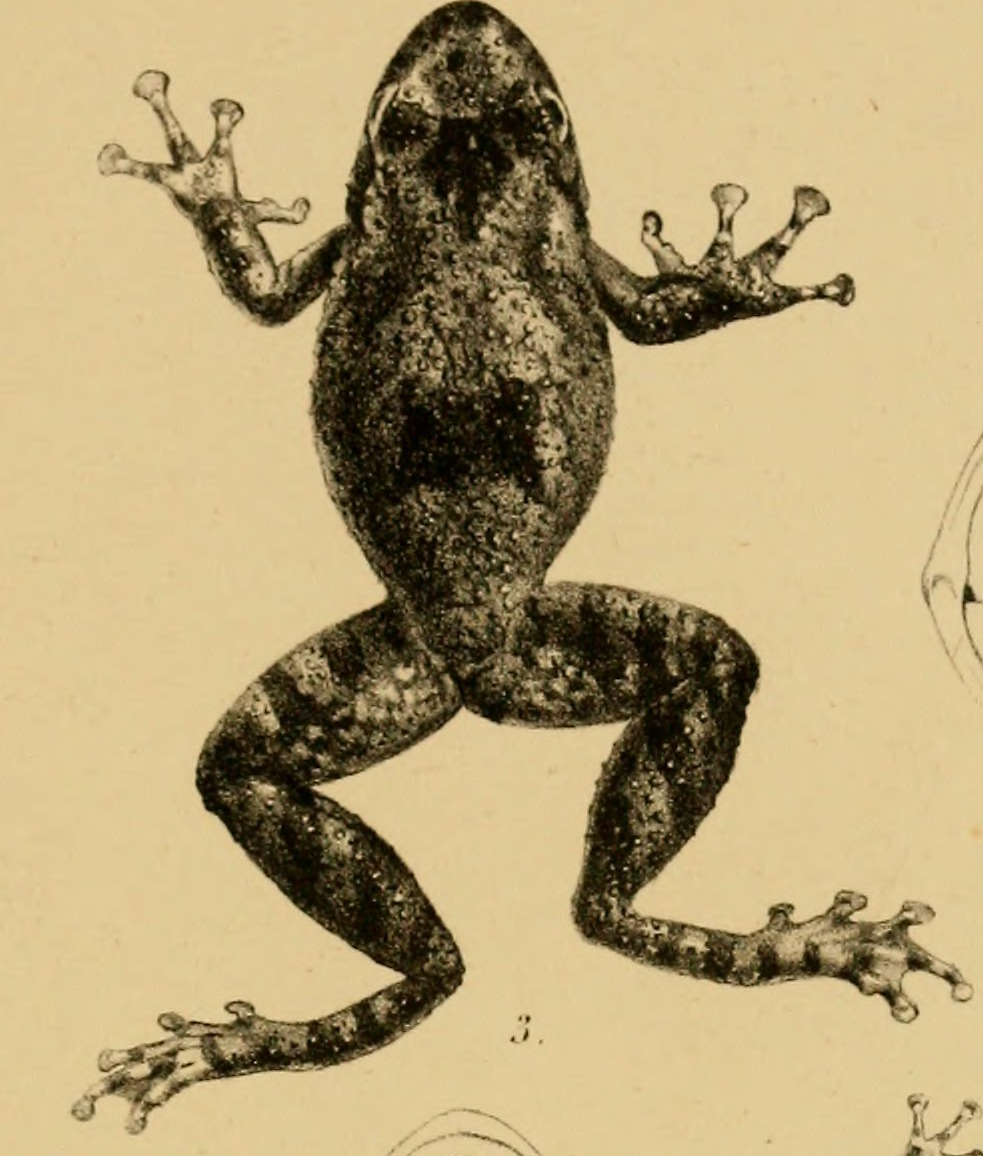

Conservation status
- Least Concern (IUCN 3.1)

Scientific classification
- Kingdom: Animalia
- Phylum: Chordata
- Class: Amphibia
- Order: Anura
- Family: Hylidae
- Genus: Scinax
- Species: S. acuminatus

Binomial name
- Scinax acuminatus (Cope, 1862)

= Scinax acuminatus =

Species of frog

Scinax acuminatus is a species of frog in the family Hylidae. It is found in Argentina, Bolivia, Brazil, Paraguay, and possibly Uruguay. Its natural habitats are moist savanna, subtropical or tropical moist shrubland, subtropical or tropical seasonally wet or flooded lowland grassland, freshwater lakes, intermittent freshwater lakes, freshwater marshes, intermittent freshwater marshes, pastureland, rural gardens, heavily degraded former forest, ponds, and canals and ditches. It breeds in bodies of water. It is threatened by eventual habitat loss, but the population is currently fairly stable, as it adapts fairly well to human encroachment and development.
