= Scinax blairi =

Conservation status
- Least Concern (IUCN 3.1)

Scientific classification
- Kingdom: Animalia
- Phylum: Chordata
- Class: Amphibia
- Order: Anura
- Family: Hylidae
- Genus: Scinax
- Species: S. blairi

Binomial name
- Scinax blairi (Fouquette & Pyburn, 1972)

Species of frog

Scinax blairi is a species of frog in the family Hylidae.

== Habitat and ecology ==
It is endemic to Colombia. Its natural habitats are moist savanna, freshwater marshes, pastureland, plantations, rural gardens, ponds, irrigated land, seasonally flooded agricultural land and canals and ditches.
