= Scinax montivagus =

Scientific classification
- Kingdom: Animalia
- Phylum: Chordata
- Class: Amphibia
- Order: Anura
- Family: Hylidae
- Genus: Scinax
- Species: S. montivagus

Binomial name
- Scinax montivagus Juncá, Napoli, Nunes, Mercês and Abreu, 2015

Species of frog

Scinax montivagus is a frog in the family Hylidae. It is endemic to Brazil. It is known solely from its type locality in the Chapada Diamantina in the Espinhaço Range.

This frog lives in rock fields and near streams.

The adult male frog measures 25.9 mm to 30.0 mm long in snout-vent length and the adult female frog 28.9 to 32.2 mm. Its nose appears round and the eyes and nostrils protrude from the head. The skin of the dorsum is gold in color. There is green coloration on the eyelids and hind legs. All four legs have brown spots. There is a trapezoidal brown intraorbital mark and a dark brown stripe near each eardrum. The belly is whitish and the chest and front legs can be red. The iris of the eye is gray-red with a dark brown pattern.

The tadpole is light yellow in color with gray-brown spots and yellow fins.
