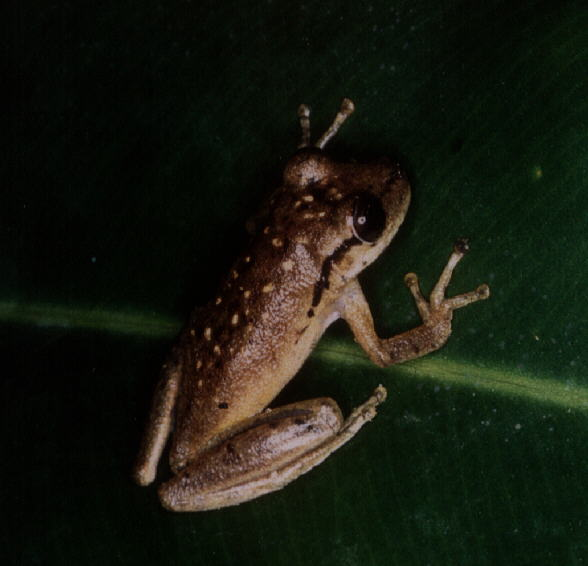

Conservation status
- Least Concern (IUCN 3.1)

Scientific classification
- Kingdom: Animalia
- Phylum: Chordata
- Class: Amphibia
- Order: Anura
- Family: Hylidae
- Genus: Scinax
- Species: S. boesemani

Binomial name
- Scinax boesemani (Goin, 1966)

Synonyms
- Hyla boesemani Goin, 1966; Ololygon boesemani (Goin, 1966)

= Scinax boesemani =

Species of frog

Scinax boesemani is a species of frog in the family Hylidae. It is found in The Guianas (Guyana, Suriname, and French Guiana), southern Venezuela (Amazonas), and northern Brazil (Amazonas and Pará). The specific name boesemani honors Marinus Boeseman, a Dutch ichthyologist. The common name Boeseman's snouted treefrog has been coined for it.

== Description ==
Male Scinax boesemani grow to a snout–vent length of 32 mm (1.3 in) and females to 33 mm (1.3 in). The fingers are unwebbed whereas the toes are webbed, although the webbing is reduced between the first two fingers. Skin is dorsally smooth to weakly granular and ventrally granular. Dorsal coloration is variable, with tan to dark brown background and cream or yellow spotting; the visibility of the spotting depends in light intensity. A dark line runs from the nostril to the arm insertion. Ventral surfaces are white.

The male advertisement call is a buzzing trill emitted at a rate of about 30 notes per minute.

== Habitat and conservation ==
Scinax boesemani occur in tropical rainforests and forest edges at elevations below 650 m (2,130 ft). They are usually found around or in bushes over small temporary bodies of water. They are nocturnal. Males call from vegetation some 5–10 m (16–33 ft) above the water. Breeding is explosive.

Scinax boesemani is a common species that adapts well to human disturbance of its habitat. There are no threats to it as a species, although it could locally suffer from habitat destruction and fires. Its range includes several protected areas.
