= Scinax imbegue =

Scientific classification
- Kingdom: Animalia
- Phylum: Chordata
- Class: Amphibia
- Order: Anura
- Family: Hylidae
- Genus: Scinax
- Species: S. imbegue

Binomial name
- Scinax imbegue Nunes, Kwet, and Pombal, 2012

Species of frog

Scinax imbegue is a frog in the family Hylidae. It is endemic to Brazil. It lives in open-forest plateaus no more than 700 meters above sea level.

== Appearance ==
The adult male frog measures 25.6–35.0 mm in snout-vent length and the adult female frog 28.8–38.0 mm. This frog is dark brown in color with darker stripes. Some individuals have two white stripes reaching from each eye to the inguinal area, but other individuals do not. There is a dark brown intraocular mark. Its ventrum and the inner thighs is lighter brown. It has disks on its toes for climbing. There is variation in the amount of webbing on the feet.

== Name ==
The scientific name of this frog is from the Tupí-guarani language. Imbegue means "it is slow." This refers to the frog's slow pulse.
