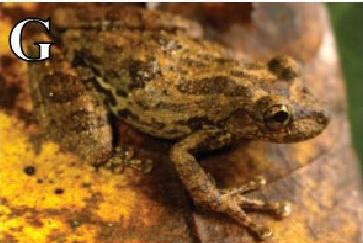

Scientific classification
- Kingdom: Animalia
- Phylum: Chordata
- Class: Amphibia
- Order: Anura
- Family: Hylidae
- Genus: Scinax
- Species: S. tropicalia

Binomial name
- Scinax tropicalia Novaes-e-Fagundes, Araujo-Vieira, Entiauspe, Roberto, Orrico, Solé, Haddad, and Loebmann, 2021

Synonyms
- Scinax x-signatus Dias et al., 2014; Scinax sp. aff. hayii Roberto & Loebmann, 2016

= Scinax tropicalia =

Species of frog

Scinax tropicalia, or Tropicalia's snouted treefrog, is a frog. Scientists report two distinct populations, both in Atlantic forest in Brazil. It lives no more than 600 meters above sea level.

== Habitat ==
This frog lives in forests on the Atlantic side (east side) of Brazil.

== Appearance ==
The adult male frog is 30.8 to 39.7 mm long in snout-vent length and the adult female frog is 35.3 to 44.1 mm long. Its chest and belly are yellow and its throat is orange. This frog is brown in color with darker brown marks and mottled, interrupted stripes going down its body. It has dark brown bars on its inner legs, outer legs, and all of its front and back toes.

The pupils of the frog's eye are horizontal. It has vomerine teeth in its jaw. The frog's upper front leg is less muscular than its lower front leg, and its front feet are proportionately large. It has disks on its front and back toes, but the hind feet have more webbing than the front feet.

== Call ==
Scientists noted that the male frog makes three kinds of sounds: It has a short, single-note advertisement call that it uses to announce its presence to females. Scientists also heard the male frog make a squeaking antagonistic call when another male frog came too close or attempted amplexus. Another male made a longer antagonistic call when, while in amplexus with a female, another male tried to push it away.

== Etymology ==
This frog is named for its habitat but also for the tropicália, or tropicalismo movement, which began in the 1960s and includes many Brazilian musicians.
