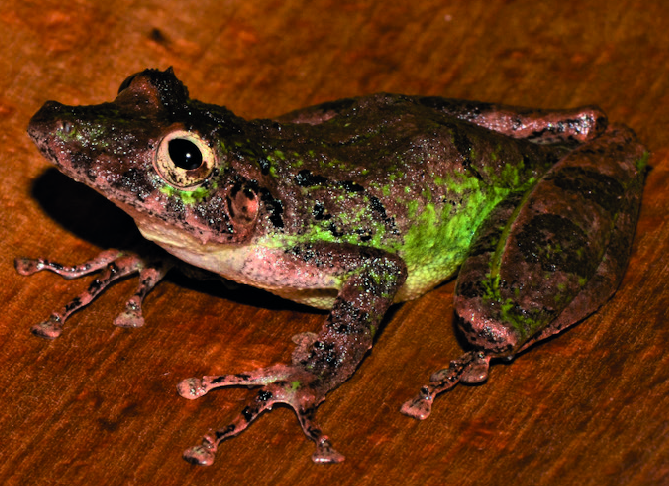
- Amapá, Brazil

Conservation status
- Data Deficient (IUCN 3.1)

Scientific classification
- Kingdom: Animalia
- Phylum: Chordata
- Class: Amphibia
- Order: Anura
- Family: Hylidae
- Genus: Scinax
- Species: S. jolyi

Binomial name
- Scinax jolyi Lescure & Marty, 2001

= Scinax jolyi =

Species of frog

Scinax jolyi is a species of frog in the family Hylidae. It is endemic to French Guiana. Its natural habitats are subtropical or tropical moist lowland forests and swamps.
