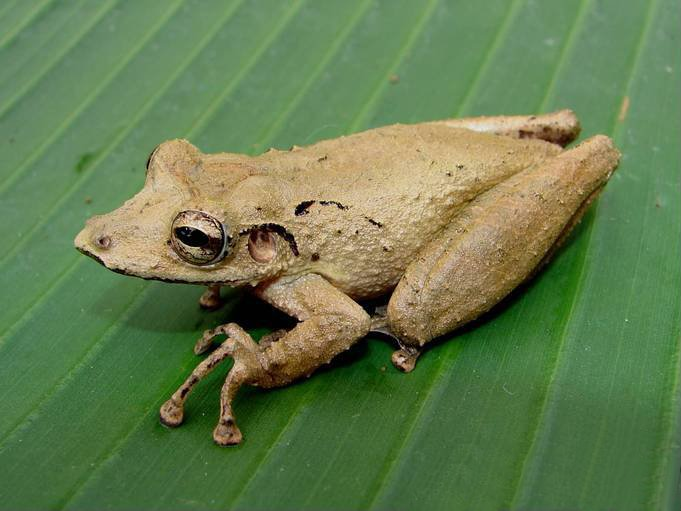

Conservation status
- Least Concern (IUCN 3.1)

Scientific classification
- Kingdom: Animalia
- Phylum: Chordata
- Class: Amphibia
- Order: Anura
- Family: Hylidae
- Genus: Scinax
- Species: S. rostratus

Binomial name
- Scinax rostratus (Peters, 1863)

Synonyms
- Hyla foliamorta Fouquette, 1958

= Scinax rostratus =

Species of frog

Scinax rostratus is a species of frog in the family Hylidae. It is found in central Panama and eastward to Colombia (where it is widespread), Venezuela (including the Llanos), and coastal lowlands of Guyana, Suriname, and French Guiana. Common name Caracas snouted treefrog has been coined for this species.

== Description ==
Males grow to 46 mm (1.8 in) and females to 48 mm (1.9 in) in snout–vent length. The snout is long. The dorsum varies from grey to brownish to orangish. There is usually a dark brown triangular patch between the eyes, and often some additional dark markings on the back. The arms and legs are barred. The venter is white. In males the throat is dark while it is white in females.

== Habitat and conservation ==
The natural habitats of Scinax rostratus are sub-humid scrubby forests and moist savannas. It can be found from sea level to 1,300 m (4,300 ft) above sea level. It is an arboreal species found perched on low vegetation at the edges of temporary or permanent ponds near moist forests. It breeds in temporary ponds. It tolerates some habitat modification. However, habitat loss is a threat to it. It occurs in a number of protected areas.
