= Scinax pedromedinae =

Conservation status
- Least Concern (IUCN 3.1)

Scientific classification
- Kingdom: Animalia
- Phylum: Chordata
- Class: Amphibia
- Order: Anura
- Family: Hylidae
- Genus: Scinax
- Species: S. pedromedinae

Binomial name
- Scinax pedromedinae (Henle, 1991)

Synonyms
- Ololygon pedromedinae Henle, 1991; Scinax pedromedinae — Duellman and Wiens, 1992

Species of frog

Scinax pedromedinae is a species of frog in the family Hylidae. It is found in the upper Amazon basin of eastern Peru, northern Bolivia, and western Brazil; its range might extent to extreme southeastern Colombia.

Scinax pedromedinae inhabit lowland tropical rainforest. Eggs are deposited in temporary pools. It can be locally very abundant. It can locally suffer from habitat loss but is not threatened overall.
