= Scinax caldarum =

Conservation status
- Least Concern (IUCN 3.1)

Scientific classification
- Kingdom: Animalia
- Phylum: Chordata
- Class: Amphibia
- Order: Anura
- Family: Hylidae
- Genus: Scinax
- Species: S. caldarum

Binomial name
- Scinax caldarum Lutz, 1968

Species of frog

Scinax caldarum is a species of frog in the family Hylidae. It is endemic to Brazil. Its natural habitats are subtropical or tropical seasonally wet or flooded lowland grassland, subtropical or tropical high-altitude grassland, freshwater marshes, intermittent freshwater marshes, pastureland, rural gardens, ponds, and canals and ditches. It is threatened by habitat loss.
