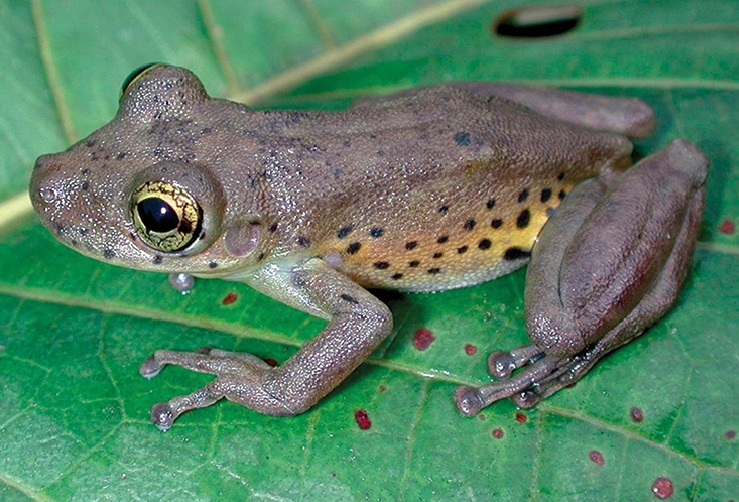

Conservation status
- Least Concern (IUCN 3.1)

Scientific classification
- Kingdom: Animalia
- Phylum: Chordata
- Class: Amphibia
- Order: Anura
- Family: Hylidae
- Genus: Scinax
- Species: S. iquitorum

Binomial name
- Scinax iquitorum Moravec, Tuanama, Pérez-Peña & Lehr, 2009

= Scinax iquitorum =

Species of frog

Scinax iquitorum is a species of frog in the family Hylidae. The species is endemic to Peru.

== Etymology ==
The specific name, iquitorum (genitive, plural), is in honor of the Iquitos who are an indigenous people of Peru.

== Geographic range ==
S. iquitorum has been observed in the areas around the Río Nanay and the Río Yavari.

== Habitat ==
The preferred natural habitat of S. iquitorum is forest, at altitudes around 120 m (390 ft).

== Description ==
S. iquitorum is light olive-green on the dorsum. The flanks are yellow with black spots. The rear sides of the thighs are black in color. The iris is gold to bronze.
