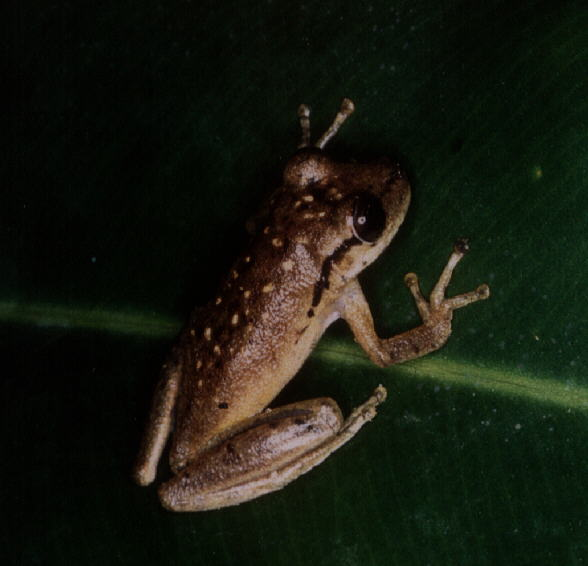
- Scinax boesemani

Scientific classification
- Kingdom: Animalia
- Phylum: Chordata
- Class: Amphibia
- Order: Anura
- Family: Hylidae
- Tribe: Dendropsophini
- Genus: Scinax; Wagler, 1830

Species
- See text

= Scinax =

Genus of amphibians

Unidentified Scinax sp., Sao Paulo

Scinax is a genus of frogs, commonly known as snouted treefrogs, in the family Hylidae. The genus is found from eastern and southern Mexico to Argentina and Uruguay, and in Trinidad and Tobago, and Saint Lucia. Member species are small to moderate-sized tree frogs, drably colored. Duellman and Wiens resurrected this genus in 1992. The name originates from the Greek word skinax, meaning quick or nimble.

== Species ==
This following species are recognised in the genus Scinax:

Binomial name and author	Common name
S. acuminatus (Cope, 1862)	Mato Grosso snouted treefrog
S. agilis (Cruz & Peixoto, 1983)	agile snouted treefrog
S. albertinae (Ferrão, Moravec, Ferreira, Moraes & Hanken, 2022)	White-sand's Snouted Treefrog
S. albicans (Bokermann, 1967)	Teresopolis snouted treefrog
S. alcatraz (B. Lutz, 1973)	Alcatraz snouted treefrog
S. altae (Dunn, 1933)
S. alter (B. Lutz, 1973)	Crubixa snouted treefrog
S. angrensis B. Lutz, 1973
S. arduous Peixoto, 2002
S. argyreornatus (Miranda-Ribeiro, 1926)	Rio Mutum snouted treefrog
S. ariadne (Bokermann, 1967)	Serra da Bocaina snouted treefrog
S. aromothyella Faivovich, 2005
S. atratus (Peixoto, 1989)	Peixoto's snouted treefrog
S. auratus (Wied-Neuwied, 1821)	Santa Ines snouted treefrog
S. baumgardneri (Rivero, 1961)	Baumgardner's snouted treefrog
S. belloni (Faivovich, Gasparini & Haddad, 2010)
S. blairi (Fouquette & Pyburn, 1972)	Blair's snouted treefrog
S. boesemani (Goin, 1966)	Boeseman's snouted treefrog
S. boulengeri (Cope, 1887)	Boulenger's snouted treefrog
S. brieni (de Witte, 1930)	Brien's snouted treefrog
S. cabralensis (Drummond, Baêta & Pires, 2007)
S. caissara (Lourenco ACC, Zina J, Catrioli GA, Kasahara S, Faivovich J, Haddad CFB, 2016)
S. caldarum (B. Lutz, 1968)	Caldas snouted treefrog
S. camposseabrai (Bokermann, 1968)
S. caprarius (Acosta-Galvis, 2018)	Canastra snouted treefrog
S. cardosoi (Carvalho e Silva & Peixoto, 1991)	Revolta snouted treefrog
S. carnevallii (Caramaschi & Kisteumacher, 1989)	Rio Doce snouted treefrog
S. castroviejoi (De la Riva, 1993)	temperate snouted treefrog
S. catharinae (Boulenger, 1888)	Catharina snouted treefrog
S. centralis Pombal & Bastos, 1996
S. chiquitanus (De la Riva, 1990)	Rio Negro snouted treefrog
S. constrictus (L. Lima, Bastos & Giaretta, 2005)
S. cosenzai Lacerda, Peixoto & Feio, 2012
S. cretatus (Nunes & Pombal, 2011)
S. crospedospilus (A. Lutz, 1925)	Campo Belo snouted treefrog
S. cruentomma (Duellman, 1972)	Manaus snouted treefrog
S. curicica (Pugliese, Pombal & Sazima, 2004)	lanceback treefrog
S. cuspidatus (A. Lutz, 1925)	coastal lowland snouted treefrog
S. danae (Duellman, 1986)	Bolivar snouted treefrog
S. dolloi (Werner, 1903)	Werner's Brazilian treefrog
S. duartei (B. Lutz, 1951)	Duarte's snouted treefrog
S. elaeochroa (Cope, 1875)	Sipurio snouted treefrog
S. eurydice (Bokermann, 1968)	Maracas snouted treefrog
S. exiguus (Duellman, 1986)	Gran Sabana snouted treefrog
S. faivovichi Brasileiro, Oyamaguchi & Haddad, 2007
S. feioi (Lourenço, Lacerda, Cruz, Nascimento & Pombal, 2020)
S. flavoguttatus (A. Lutz & B. Lutz, 1939)	yellowbelly snouted treefrog
S. fontanarrosai (Baldo, Araujo-Vieira, Cardozo, Borteiro, Leal, Pereyra, Kolenc, Lyra, Garcia, Haddad & Faivovich, 2019)
S. funereus (Cope, 1874)	Moyobamba snouted treefrog
S. fuscomarginatus (A. Lutz, 1925)	brown-bordered snouted treefrog
S. fuscovarius (A. Lutz, 1925)	snouted treefrog
S. garbei (Miranda-Ribeiro, 1926)	Eirunepe snouted treefrog
S. garibaldiae (Lourenço ACC, R Lingnau, CFB Haddad, and J Faivovich, 2019)
S. granulatus (Peters, 1871)
S. haddadorum (Araujo-Vieira, Valdujo & Faivovich, 2016)
S. hayii (Barbour, 1909)	Hay's snouted treefrog
S. heyeri (Peixoto & Weygoldt in Wetgoldt, 1986)	Heyer's snouted treefrog
S. hiemalis (Haddad & Pombal, 1987)	Sousas snouted treefrog
S. humilis (Lutz, 1954)	Rio Babi snouted treefrog
S. ictericus (Duellman & Wiens, 1993)
S. imbegue (Nunes, Kwet & Pombal, 2012)
S. insperatus (Silva & Alves-Silva, 2011)
S. iquitorum (Moravec, Tuanama, Pérez-Peña & Lehr, 2009)
S. jolyi (Lescure & Marty, 2000)
S. juncae (Nunes & Pombal, 2010)
S. jureia (Pombal & Gordo, 1991)	Jureia snouted treefrog
S. karenanneae (Pyburn, 1993)	Vaupes treefrog
S. kautskyi (Carvalho e Silva & Peixoto, 1991)	Kautsky's snouted treefrog
S. kennedyi (Pyburn, 1973)	Kennedy's snouted treefrog
S. lindsayi (Pyburn, 1992)	Lindsay's snouted treefrog
S. littoralis (Pombal & Gordo, 1991)	Rio Verde snouted treefrog
S. littoreus (Peixoto, 1988)	coastal snouted treefrog
S. longilineus (Lutz, 1968)	Lutz's snouted treefrog
S. luizotavioi (Caramaschi & Kisteumacher, 1989)	Santa Barbara snouted treefrog
S. machadoi (Bokermann & Sazima, 1973)	Machado's snouted treefrog
S. madeirae (Bokermann, 1964)
S. manriquei (Barrio-Amorós, Orellana & Chacón-Ortiz, 2004)
S. maracaya (Cardoso & Sazima, 1980)	Alpinopolis snouted treefrog
S. melanodactylus (Lourenco ACC, Luna MC, Pombal Jr JP, 2014)
S. melloi (Peixoto, 1989)	southeastern Brazil snouted treefrog
S. montivagus (Juncá, Napoli, Nunes, Mercȇs & Abreu, 2015)
S. muriciensis (Cruz, Nunes & Lima, 2011)
S. nasicus (Cope, 1862)	lesser snouted treefrog
S. nebulosus (Spix, 1824)	Spix's snouted treefrog
S. obtriangulatus (B. Lutz, 1973)	São Paulo snouted treefrog
S. onca (Ferrão, Moravec, Fraga, Pinheiro de Almeida, Kaefer & A. Lima, 2017)	Jaguar snouted tree frog
S. oreites (Duellman & Wiens, 1993)	Balzapata snouted treefrog
S. pachycrus (Miranda-Ribeiro, 1937)	Pocao snouted treefrog
S. pedromedinae (Henle, 1991)	Henle's snouted treefrog
S. peixotoi Brasileiro, Haddad, Sawaya & Martins, 2007
S. perereca (Pombal, Haddad & Kasahara, 1995)
S. perpusillus (A. Lutz & B. Lutz, 1939)	Bandeirantes snouted treefrog
S. pinima (Bokermann & Sazima, 1973)	Sazima's treefrog
S. pixinguinha (Lacerda, Ferreira, Araujo-Vieira, Zocca & Lourenço, 2021)
S. pombali (Lourenco ACC, de Carvalho ALG, aeta D, Pezzuti TL, Leite FSF, 2013)
S. proboscideus (Brongersma, 1933)	Gran Rio snouted treefrog
S. pyroinguinis (Lourenco ACC, de Carvalho ALG, aeta D, Pezzuti TL, Leite FSF, 2013)
S. quinquefasciatus (Fowler, 1913)	Fowler's snouted treefrog
S. ranki (Andrade & Cardoso, 1987)	Rank's snouted treefrog
S. rizibilis (Bokermann, 1964)	Santo Andre snouted treefrog
S. rogerioi (Pugliese, Baêta & Pombal, 2009)
S. rossaferesae (Conte, Araujo-Vieira, Crivellari & Berneck, 2016)
S. rostratus (Peters, 1863)	Caracas snouted treefrog
S. ruber (Laurenti, 1768)	red snouted treefrog
S. ruberoculatus (Ferrão, Fraga, Moravec, Kaefer & A. Lima, 2018)
S. rupestris (Araujo-Vieira, Brandão & Faria, 2015)
S. sateremawe (Sturaro & Peloso, 2014)
S. similis (Cochran, 1952)	Cochran's snouted treefrog
S. skaios (Pombal Jr JP, Carvalho Jr RR, Canelas MAS, Bastos P, 2010)
S. squalirostris (A. Lutz, 1925)	striped snouted treefrog
S. staufferi (Cope, 1865)	Stauffer's treefrog
S. strigilatus (Spix, 1824)	Bahia snouted treefrog
S. strussmannae (Ferrão, Moravec, Kaefer, Fraga & Lima, 2018)	Strüssmann's snouted tree frog
S. sugillatus (Duellman, 1973)	Quevedo snouted treefrog
S. tigrinus (Nunes, Carvalho & Pereira, 2010)
S. trapicheiroi (A. Lutz & B. Lutz, 1954)	three-lined snouted treefrog
S. tripui (Lourenco ACC, Nascimento LB, Pires MRS, 2010)
S. tropicalia (Novaes-e-Fagundes, Araujo-Vieira, Entiauspe, Roberto, Orrico, Solé, Haddad & Loebmann, 2021)
S. tsachila (Ron, Duellman, Caminer & Pazmiño, 2018)
S. tymbamirim (Nunes, Kwet & Pombal, 2012)
S. uruguayus (Schmidt, 1944)	Schmidt's Uruguay treefrog
S. villasboasi (Brusquetti, Jansen, Barrio-Amorós, Segalla & Haddad, 2014)
S. v-signatus (B. Lutz, 1968)	forest snouted treefrog
S. wandae (Pyburn & Fouquette, 1971)	Villavicencio snouted treefrog
S. x-signatus (Spix, 1824)	Venezuela snouted treefrog
