= Scinax pyroinguinis =

Scientific classification
- Kingdom: Animalia
- Phylum: Chordata
- Class: Amphibia
- Order: Anura
- Family: Hylidae
- Genus: Scinax
- Species: S. pyroinguinis

Binomial name
- Scinax pyroinguinis Chávez, Aznaran, García Ayachi, and Catenazzi, 2023

Species of frog

Scinax pyroinguinis is a species of frog in the family Hylidae from Peru's Ucayali River. It has unique orange and black markings on its inner hind legs.
