= Scinax baumgardneri =

Conservation status
- Data Deficient (IUCN 3.1)

Scientific classification
- Kingdom: Animalia
- Phylum: Chordata
- Class: Amphibia
- Order: Anura
- Family: Hylidae
- Genus: Scinax
- Species: S. baumgardneri

Binomial name
- Scinax baumgardneri (Rivero, 1961)

Species of frog

Scinax baumgardneri is a species of frog in the family Hylidae. It is endemic to Venezuela. Its natural habitats are subtropical or tropical moist lowland forests and intermittent freshwater marshes. It is threatened by habitat loss.
