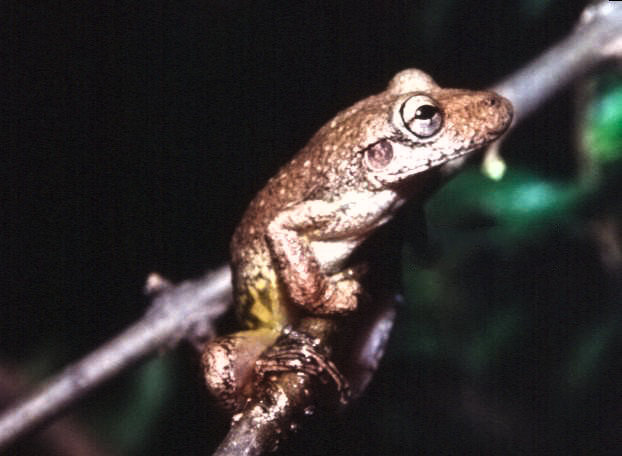

Conservation status
- Least Concern (IUCN 3.1)

Scientific classification
- Kingdom: Animalia
- Phylum: Chordata
- Class: Amphibia
- Order: Anura
- Family: Hylidae
- Genus: Scinax
- Species: S. hayii

Binomial name
- Scinax hayii (Barbour, 1909)

= Scinax hayii =

Species of frog

Scinax hayii is a species of frog in the family Hylidae. It is endemic to Brazil. Its natural habitats are subtropical or tropical moist lowland forests, subtropical or tropical moist montane forests, rivers, freshwater marshes, intermittent freshwater marshes, pastureland, urban areas, heavily degraded former forest, and ponds.
