= Scinax duartei =

Conservation status
- Least Concern (IUCN 3.1)

Scientific classification
- Kingdom: Animalia
- Phylum: Chordata
- Class: Amphibia
- Order: Anura
- Family: Hylidae
- Genus: Scinax
- Species: S. duartei

Binomial name
- Scinax duartei (B. Lutz, 1951)

Species of frog

Scinax duartei is a species of frog in the family Hylidae. It is endemic to Brazil. Its natural habitats are subtropical or tropical high-altitude grassland, rivers, intermittent rivers, intermittent freshwater marshes, and rocky areas. It is threatened by habitat loss.
