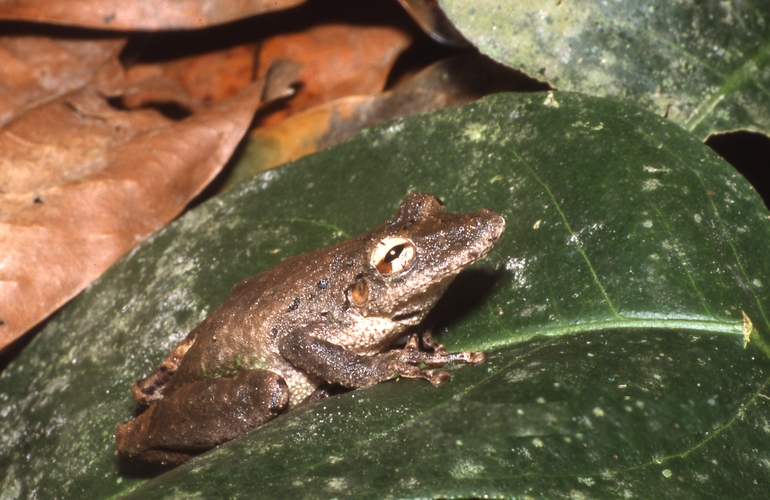

Conservation status
- Least Concern (IUCN 3.1)

Scientific classification
- Kingdom: Animalia
- Phylum: Chordata
- Class: Amphibia
- Order: Anura
- Family: Hylidae
- Genus: Scinax
- Species: S. garbei

Binomial name
- Scinax garbei (Miranda-Ribeiro, 1926)

Synonyms
- Hyla epacrorhina Duellman, 1972; Hyla lutzi Melin, 1941

= Scinax garbei =

Species of frog

Scinax garbei is a species of frog in the family Hylidae. It is found in Bolivia, Brazil, Colombia, Ecuador, Peru, Venezuela, and possibly Guyana. Its natural habitats are subtropical or tropical moist lowland forests, subtropical or tropical swamps, rivers, intermittent freshwater marshes, plantations, rural gardens, heavily degraded former forest, and ponds.
