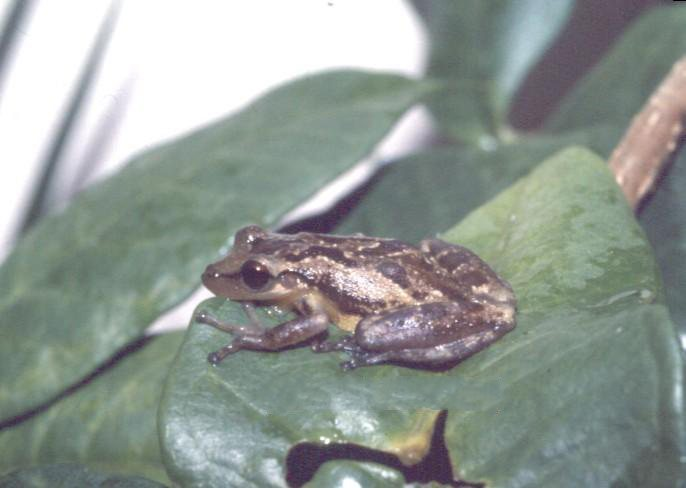

Conservation status
- Least Concern (IUCN 3.1)

Scientific classification
- Kingdom: Animalia
- Phylum: Chordata
- Class: Amphibia
- Order: Anura
- Family: Hylidae
- Genus: Scinax
- Species: S. crospedospilus

Binomial name
- Scinax crospedospilus (A. Lutz, 1925)

= Scinax crospedospilus =

Species of frog

Scinax crospedospilus is a species of frog in the family Hylidae. It is endemic to Brazil. Its natural habitats are subtropical or tropical moist shrubland, subtropical or tropical seasonally wet or flooded lowland grassland, subtropical or tropical high-altitude grassland, freshwater marshes, intermittent freshwater marshes, pastureland, heavily degraded former forest, ponds, and canals and ditches.
