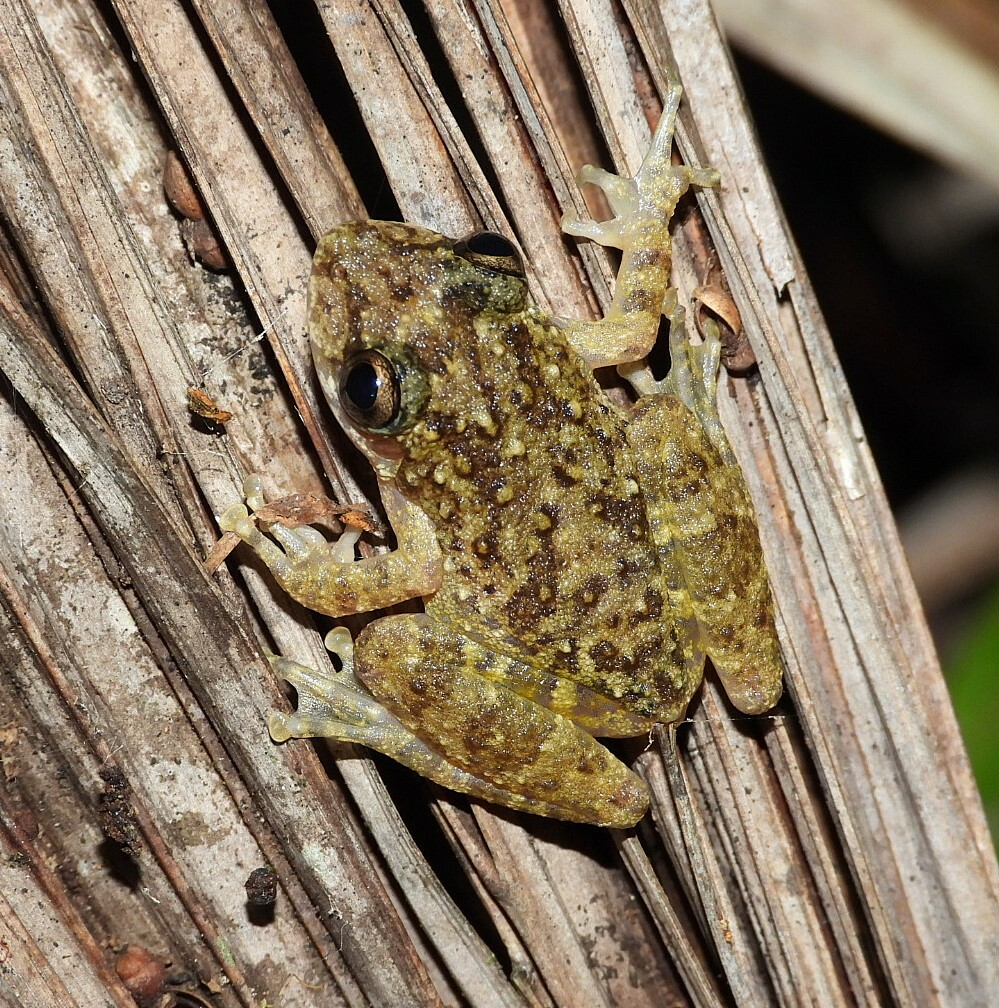

Scientific classification
- Kingdom: Animalia
- Phylum: Chordata
- Class: Amphibia
- Order: Anura
- Family: Hylidae
- Genus: Scinax
- Species: S. haddadorum

Binomial name
- Scinax haddadorum Araujo-Vieira, Valdujo, and Faivovich, 2016

= Scinax haddadorum =

Species of frog

Scinax haddadorum is a species of frog in the family Hylidae. It is endemic to Mato Grosso, Brazil, where it has been found in only a single location.
