= Scinax villasboasi =

Scientific classification
- Kingdom: Animalia
- Phylum: Chordata
- Class: Amphibia
- Order: Anura
- Family: Hylidae
- Genus: Scinax
- Species: S. villasboasi

Binomial name
- Scinax villasboasi Brusquetti, Jansen, Barrio-Amorós, Segalla, and Haddad, 2014

Species of frog

Scinax villasboasi is a frog in the family Hylidae. It is endemic to Brazil. Scientists know it exclusively from its type locality: Campo de Provas in Pará.
