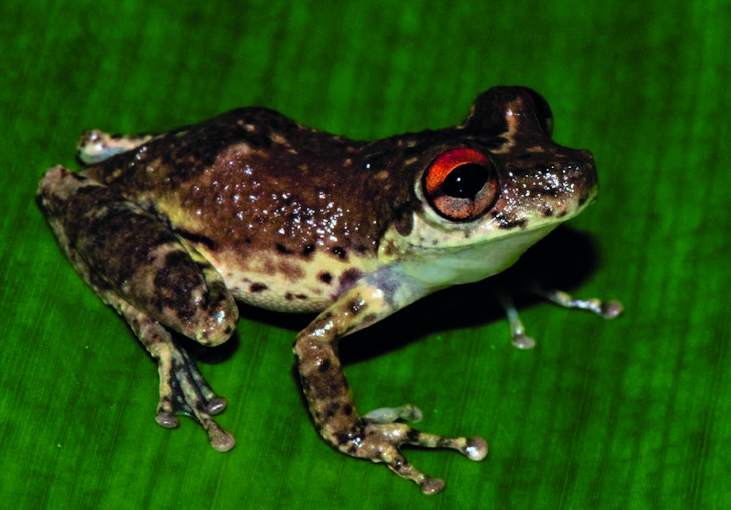
- Amapá, Brazil

Scientific classification
- Kingdom: Animalia
- Phylum: Chordata
- Class: Amphibia
- Order: Anura
- Family: Hylidae
- Genus: Scinax
- Species: S. ruberoculatus

Binomial name
- Scinax ruberoculatus Ferrão, Moravec, Kaefer, Fraga, and Lima, 2018

= Scinax ruberoculatus =

Species of frog

Scinax ruberoculatus, the red-eyed snouted tree frog, is a frog in the family Hylidae. It is endemic to forest habitats in Brazil, Suriname, and French Guiana.

== Description ==
The name ruberoculatus comes from the Latin words ruber for "red" and oculatus for "having eyes."

The red-eyed snouted tree frog is distinguishable from other frogs Scinax by its small size: The adult male frog measures 22.6–25.9 mm in snout-vent length and the adult female frog 25.4–27.5 mm. This frog is light gray or light brown in color on the dorsum with a dark spot on its head resembling a moth or a human molar. There is a whitish stripe on each side of the body. The upper half of the iris of the eye is red in color and the bottom half is gray. The ventrum is whitish.

The tadpole is about 22.2 mm long in total length. The body is bronze in color with darker brown spots. Young frogs are gray with darker spots. The irises of their eyes are red all around with black color around the iris.
