= Scinax cosenzai =

Scientific classification
- Kingdom: Animalia
- Phylum: Chordata
- Class: Amphibia
- Order: Anura
- Family: Hylidae
- Genus: Scinax
- Species: S. cosenzai

Binomial name
- Scinax cosenzai Nunes, Kwet, and Pombal, 2012

Synonyms
- Ololygon cosenzai (Lacerda, Peixoto and Feio, 2012)

Species of amphibian

Scinax cosenzai is a species of frog in the family Hylidae. It is endemic to Brazil. People have seen it in the Parque Estadual da Serra do Brigadero in Minas Gerais.

The adult male frog measures 17.29–20.97 mm in snout-vent length and the adult female frog 22.65–24.02 mm.

The skin of the dorsum has tubercles and granules that increase in density toward the cloacal region. The skin of the dorsum is gray in color with dark marks on it. There are dark transverse bars across the legs. The skin on the hidden surfaces of the hind legs has an irregular bright yellow pattern.
