= Scinax cabralensis =

Conservation status
- Data Deficient (IUCN 3.1)

Scientific classification
- Domain: Eukaryota
- Kingdom: Animalia
- Phylum: Chordata
- Class: Amphibia
- Order: Anura
- Family: Hylidae
- Genus: Scinax
- Species: S. cabralensis

Binomial name
- Scinax cabralensis Drummond, Baêta & Pires, 2007

Species of frog

Scinax cabralensis is a species of frog in the family Hylidae. It is endemic to Brazil.
