= Scinax rossaferesae =

Scientific classification
- Kingdom: Animalia
- Phylum: Chordata
- Class: Amphibia
- Order: Anura
- Family: Hylidae
- Genus: Scinax
- Species: S. rossaferesae

Binomial name
- Scinax rossaferesae Conte, Araujo-Vieira, Crivellari, and Berneck, 2016

Species of frog

Scinax rossaferesae is a frog in the family Hylidae. It is endemic to Brazil and has been observed in the Guartelá Canyon area.

The adult male frog measures 27.8 to 31.6 mm in snout-vent length. The iris of its eye is gold or yellow in color. Parts of its legs are light brown.

The scientists who initially described this frog named it after their colleagues Dr. Denise Rossa-Feres, zoologist.
