= Scinax exiguus =

Conservation status
- Least Concern (IUCN 3.1)

Scientific classification
- Kingdom: Animalia
- Phylum: Chordata
- Class: Amphibia
- Order: Anura
- Family: Hylidae
- Genus: Scinax
- Species: S. exiguus

Binomial name
- Scinax exiguus (Duellman, 1986)

Synonyms
- Ololygon exigua Duellman, 1986; Scinax exigua (Duellman, 1986)

Species of frog

Scinax exiguus is a species of frog in the family Hylidae. It is found in the Gran Sabana of Venezuela and in the Roraima state of the adjacent northern Brazil, as far south as Boa Vista, Roraima. Common name Gran Sabana snouted treefrog has been coined for it.

== Description ==
Adult males measure 18–23 mm (0.7–0.9 in) and adult females 20–25 mm (0.8–1.0 in) in snout–vent length. The body is slender and the head is much longer than it is wide. The snout is subacuminate in dorsal view and acuminate in profile. The tympanum is distinct. The fingers have basal webbing whereas the toes are half-webbed; both bear subtruncate discs at the tips of the digits. The coloration varies by time of day. At night, the dorsum is pale yellowish tan and displays darker tan markings and cream dorsolateral stripes. Some individuals have a dark middorsal line. The belly is cream. By day, the dorsum becomes brown with dark brown stripes on the body and transverse bars on the limbs. The venter is dull cream. The iris is grayish bronze and has a median horizontal reddish brown streak. Males have yellow vocal sac.

== Habitat and conservation ==
Scinax exiguus occurs in margins of wetlands, marshes, and slow-flowing streams at elevations of 500–1,500 m (1,600–4,900 ft) above sea level. Males call from grasses, and a couple in amplexus has been found in a bush about 1 meter above water. The tadpoles develop in shallow pools.

Scinax exiguus is a common species that is not facing significant threats. It might occur in the Canaima National Park.
