= Scinax tigrinus =

Conservation status
- Least Concern (IUCN 3.1)

Scientific classification
- Kingdom: Animalia
- Phylum: Chordata
- Class: Amphibia
- Order: Anura
- Family: Hylidae
- Genus: Scinax
- Species: S. tigrinus

Binomial name
- Scinax tigrinus Nunes, Carvalho, and Pereira, 2010

Species of frog

Scinax tigrinus is a frog in the family Hylidae. It is endemic to Brazil.

The adult male frog measures 28.4 to 30.8 mm long in snout-vent length. This frog has orange-yellow flash color in the form of transverse stripes on its hind legs.
