= Scinax dolloi =

Scientific classification
- Domain: Eukaryota
- Kingdom: Animalia
- Phylum: Chordata
- Class: Amphibia
- Order: Anura
- Family: Hylidae
- Genus: Scinax
- Species: S. dolloi

Binomial name
- Scinax dolloi (Werner, 1903)

Synonyms
- Hyla dolloi Werner, 1903; Scinax dolloi Faivovich, Haddad, Garcia, Frost, Campbell, and Wheeler, 2005

Species of frog

Scinax dolloi, or Werner's Brazilian tree frog, is a frog in the family Hylidae. It is endemic to Brazil. Scientists know it exclusively from its type locality in the Mantiqueira Range.
