= Scinax wandae =

Conservation status
- Least Concern (IUCN 3.1)

Scientific classification
- Kingdom: Animalia
- Phylum: Chordata
- Class: Amphibia
- Order: Anura
- Family: Hylidae
- Genus: Scinax
- Species: S. wandae

Binomial name
- Scinax wandae (Pyburn & Fouquette, 1971)

Species of frog

Scinax wandae is a species of frog in the family Hylidae. It is found in Colombia and Venezuela. Its natural habitats are moist savanna, subtropical or tropical seasonally wet or flooded lowland grassland, freshwater marshes, intermittent freshwater marshes, pastureland, ponds, irrigated land, seasonally flooded agricultural land, and canals and ditches.
