= Scinax lindsayi =

Conservation status
- Least Concern (IUCN 3.1)

Scientific classification
- Kingdom: Animalia
- Phylum: Chordata
- Class: Amphibia
- Order: Anura
- Family: Hylidae
- Genus: Scinax
- Species: S. lindsayi

Binomial name
- Scinax lindsayi Pyburn, 1992

Species of frog

Scinax lindsayi is a species of frog in the family Hylidae. It is found in Brazil, Colombia, and possibly Venezuela. Its natural habitats are subtropical or tropical moist lowland forests and intermittent freshwater marshes. It is threatened by habitat loss.
