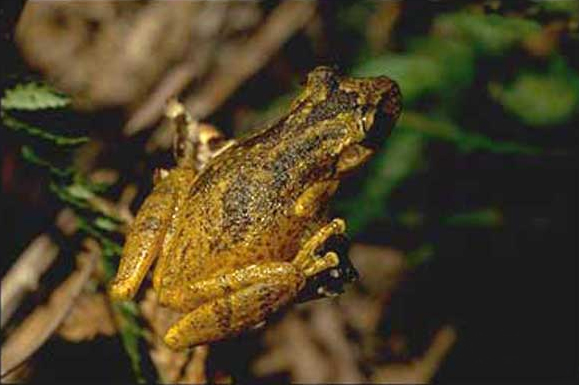

Conservation status
- Least Concern (IUCN 3.1)

Scientific classification
- Kingdom: Animalia
- Phylum: Chordata
- Class: Amphibia
- Order: Anura
- Family: Hylidae
- Genus: Scinax
- Species: S. perereca

Binomial name
- Scinax perereca Pombal, Haddad & Kasahara, 1995

= Scinax perereca =

Species of frog

Scinax perereca is a species of frog in the family Hylidae. It is found in Brazil, Argentina, and Paraguay. Its natural habitats are subtropical or tropical moist lowland forests, freshwater marshes, intermittent freshwater marshes, heavily degraded former forest, ponds, and canals and ditches. It is threatened by habitat loss.
