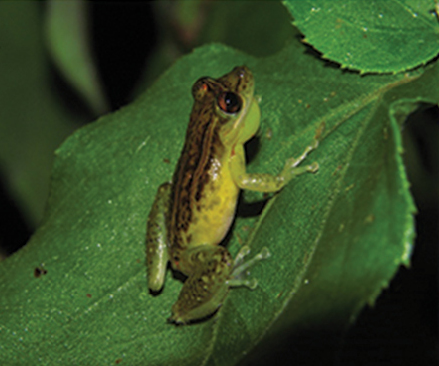

Scientific classification
- Kingdom: Animalia
- Phylum: Chordata
- Class: Amphibia
- Order: Anura
- Family: Hylidae
- Genus: Scinax
- Species: S. juncae

Binomial name
- Scinax juncae Nunes and Pombal, 2010

= Scinax juncae =

Species of amphibian

Scinax juncae is a species of frog in the family Hylidae. It is endemic to Brazil.

== Description ==
The adult male frog measures 23.0 to 27.1 mm in snout-vent length. It has a yellowish stripe across its face and green-brown skin on the dorsum with yellow-green stripes. Its head is larger than its body.

== Habitat ==
This frog lives in forests and nearby open areas near with bodies of water such as springs, ponds, and streams. The frogs were found while singing, seated on shrubs.

== Taxonomy ==
Scientists named this frog after a herpetologist Dr. Flora Acuña Juncá.
