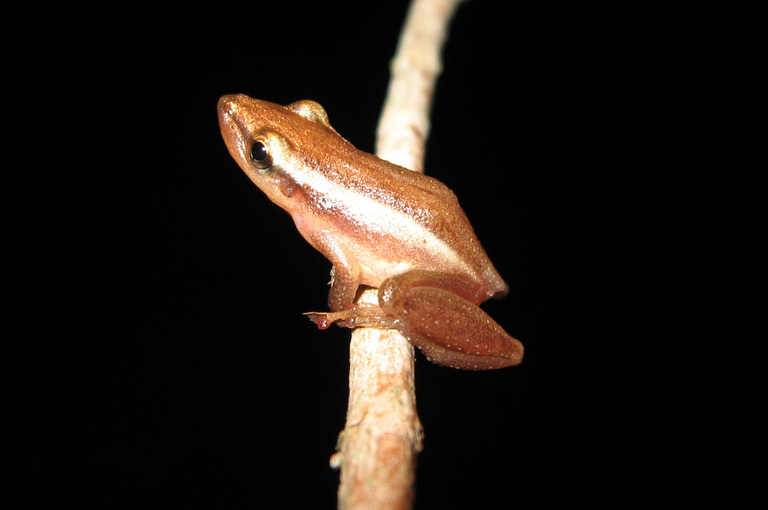

Conservation status
- Least Concern (IUCN 3.1)

Scientific classification
- Kingdom: Animalia
- Phylum: Chordata
- Class: Amphibia
- Order: Anura
- Family: Hylidae
- Genus: Scinax
- Species: S. squalirostris

Binomial name
- Scinax squalirostris (A. Lutz, 1925)

Synonyms
- Hyla leucotaenia Burmeister, 1861 — nomen oblitum; Hyla squalirostris Lutz, 1925; Hyla lindneri Müller and Hellmich, 1936; Hyla evelynae Schmidt, 1944

= Scinax squalirostris =

Species of frog

Scinax squalirostris is a species of frog in the family Hylidae. It is found in southeastern, southern and central Brazil, Uruguay, northeastern Argentina, southern Paraguay, and Bolivia. The nominal species might actually represent more than one species. Common names striped snouted treefrog and long-snouted treefrog have been coined for it.

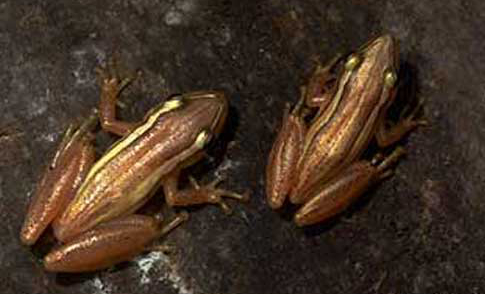
Scinax squalirostris from above.

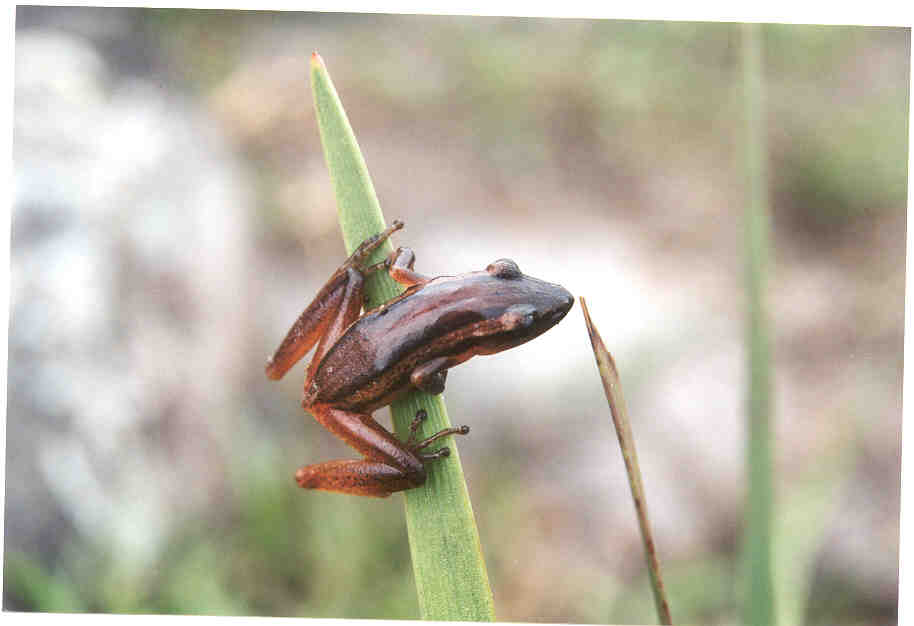
Scinax squalirostris perched on a leaf.

== Description ==
Scinax squalirostris is a small species measuring 24–29 mm (0.94–1.14 in) in snout–vent length. The overall appearance is slender; the limbs are slender and the hind limbs are fairly long. The head is long and wider than the body. The snout is very elongated. The tympanum is distinct. The dorsal ground color is brownish. There is a narrow, black mid-dorsal line and black canthal lines bordered with white. Two black stripes start from the eye and enclose a white or flesh-colored area. The belly is greenish yellow. The vocal sac is large and lemon-colored.

== Habitat and conservation ==
Scinax squalirostris occurs in open areas of grasslands, rushes, and Eryngium spp., but also in forests, at elevations below 1,500 m (4,900 ft). Breeding takes place in small permanent and temporary waterbodies, including cattle ponds.

Scinax squalirostris is a common species that adapts well to anthropogenic disturbance. Pollution might be a localized threat. It is known from several protected areas in Brazil and Argentina.
