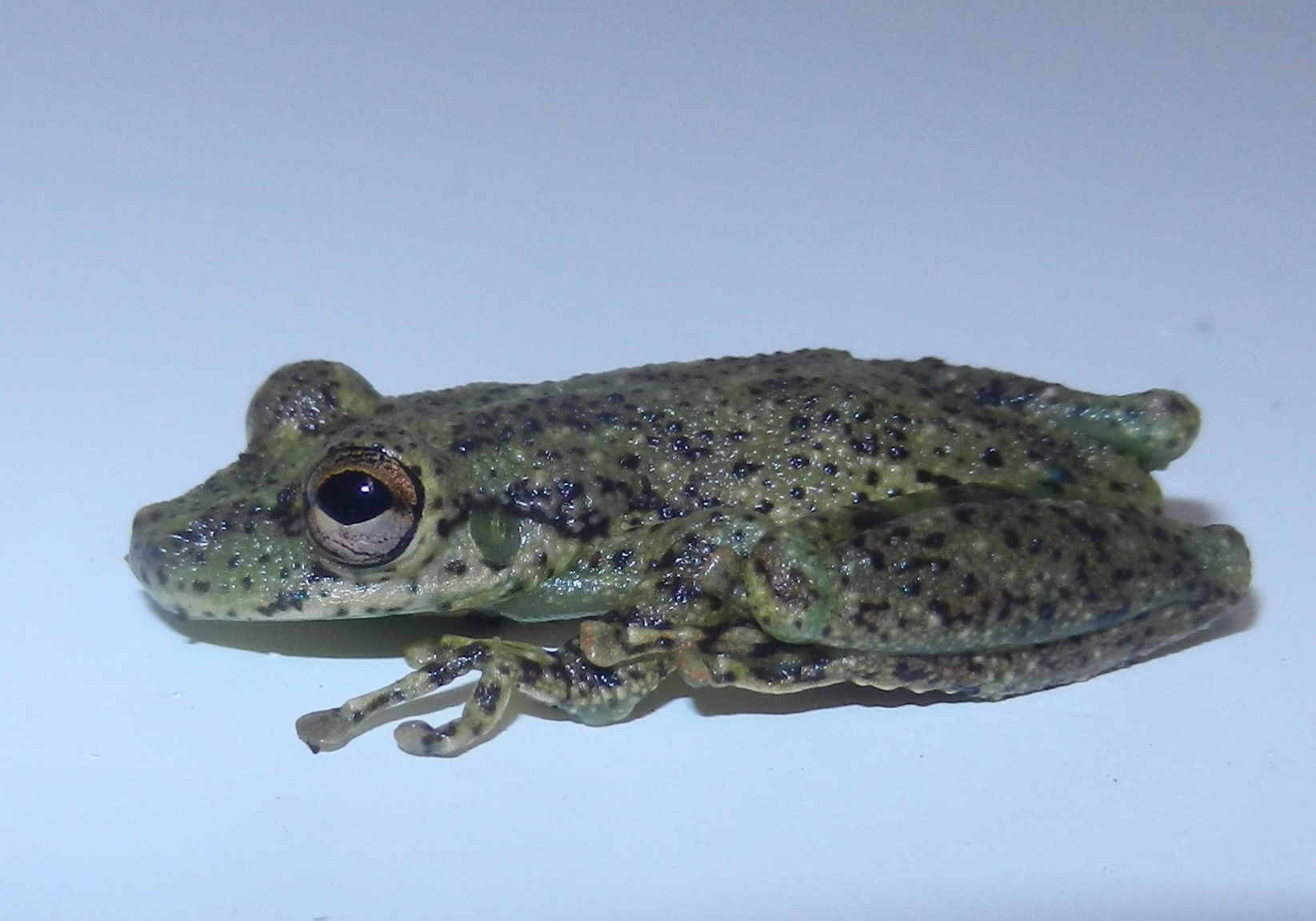

Conservation status
- Least Concern (IUCN 3.1)

Scientific classification
- Kingdom: Animalia
- Phylum: Chordata
- Class: Amphibia
- Order: Anura
- Family: Hylidae
- Genus: Scinax
- Species: S. funereus

Binomial name
- Scinax funereus (Cope, 1874)

Synonyms
- Hyla depressiceps Boulenger, 1882; Hyla rubra ssp. inconspicua Melin, 1941

= Scinax funereus =

Species of frog

Scinax funereus is a species of frog in the family Hylidae. It is found in Brazil, Ecuador, Peru, and possibly Bolivia. Its natural habitats are subtropical or tropical moist lowland forests, intermittent freshwater marshes, rural gardens, and heavily degraded former forest.
