= Scinax manriquei =

Conservation status
- Near Threatened (IUCN 3.1)

Scientific classification
- Kingdom: Animalia
- Phylum: Chordata
- Class: Amphibia
- Order: Anura
- Family: Hylidae
- Genus: Scinax
- Species: S. manriquei

Binomial name
- Scinax manriquei Barrio-Amorós, Orellana, & Chacón-Ortiz, 2004

Synonyms
- Scinax flavidus La Marca, 2004

Species of amphibian

Scinax manriquei is a species of frogs in the family Hylidae. It was described in 2004 from Venezuela, the same year as Scinax flavidus was described from Colombia. They are now considered to be synonyms, with Scinax manriquei having the seniority over Scinax flavidus. The species thus defined occurs in the Andean footshills of both Colombia and Venezuela. It has been found in cloud forests as well as in a variety of disturbed habitats.
