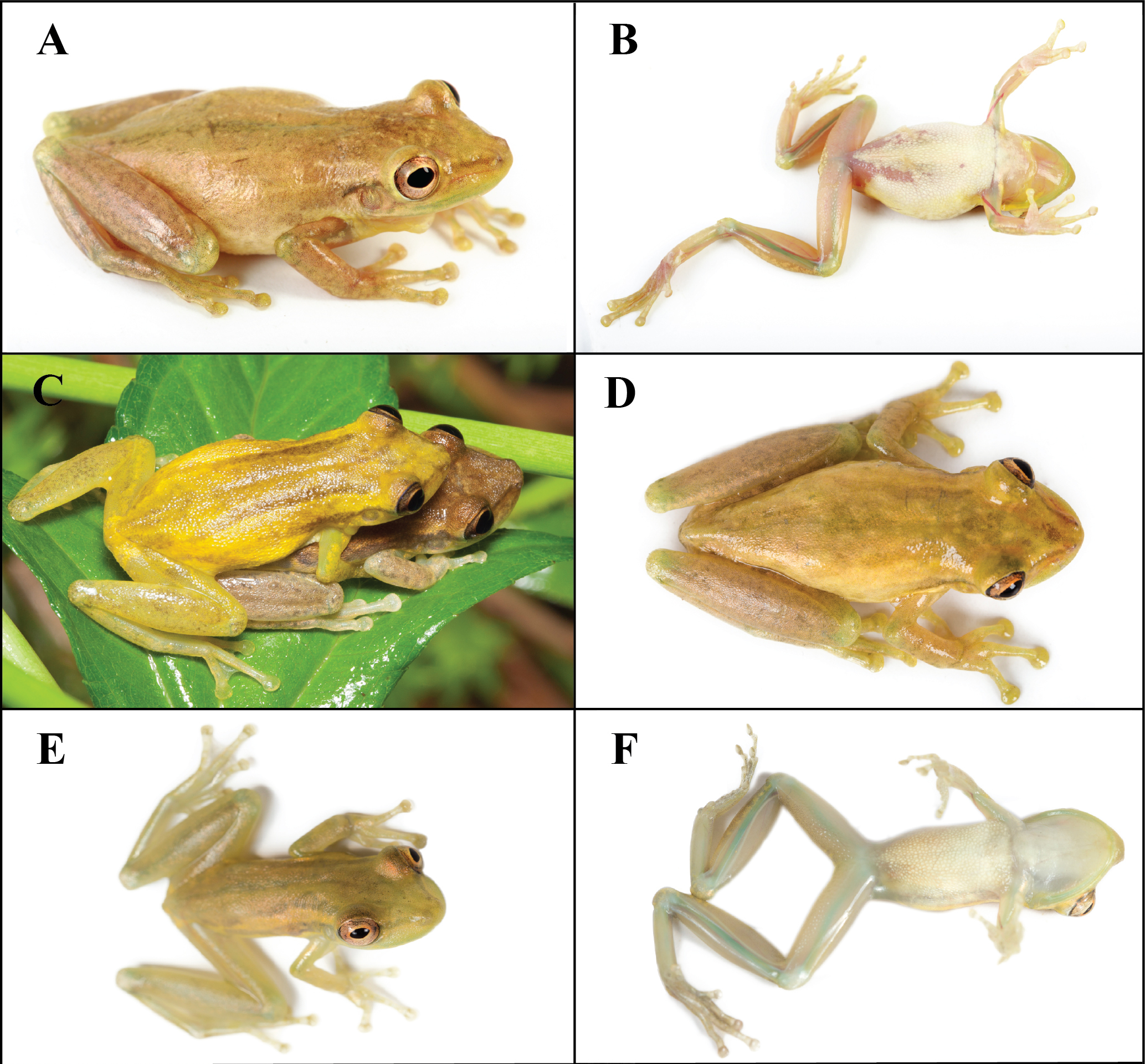

Scientific classification
- Kingdom: Animalia
- Phylum: Chordata
- Class: Amphibia
- Order: Anura
- Family: Hylidae
- Genus: Scinax
- Species: S. tsachila

Binomial name
- Scinax tsachila Ron, Duellman, Caminer, and Pazmiño, 2018

= Scinax tsachila =

Species of frog

Scinax tsachila is a frog in the family Hylidae. It is endemic to Ecuador and probably also lives in Peru and Colombia. Scientists have seen from sea level to 1207 meters above sea level. It lives on the Pacific side of the contienent.

== Appearance ==
The adult male frog measures 27.2 to 34.2 mm in snout-vent length and the adult female frog 33.2 to 36.4 mm. This frog is medium-brown in color, though some individuals have stripes down their sides and some do not.

== Home ==
This frog lives in partially or fully open areas, including secondary forest and piedmont forest. No individual was found in primary forest. Because scientists have seen this frog in artificially open areas, they do not think its numbers will decline as deforestation continues.

The male frog chooses a site near a pond, lake, or other body of water. He sits on the ground or perches on low vegetation and sings for the female.

== Etymology ==
This frog is named after the Tsáchila indigenous people, who live nearby.
