= Scinax sugillatus =

Acute tree frog (Scinax sugillatus)

Conservation status
- Least Concern (IUCN 3.1)

Scientific classification
- Kingdom: Animalia
- Phylum: Chordata
- Class: Amphibia
- Order: Anura
- Family: Hylidae
- Genus: Scinax
- Species: S. sugillatus

Binomial name
- Scinax sugillatus (Duellman, 1973)

Species of frog

Scinax sugillatus, also known as the acute tree frog, is a species of true frog in the tree frog family, Hylidae. It is found in Colombia and Ecuador.

Its natural habitats are subtropical or tropical moist lowland forests, freshwater marshes, intermittent freshwater marshes, plantations, rural gardens, heavily degraded former forest, and ponds.
