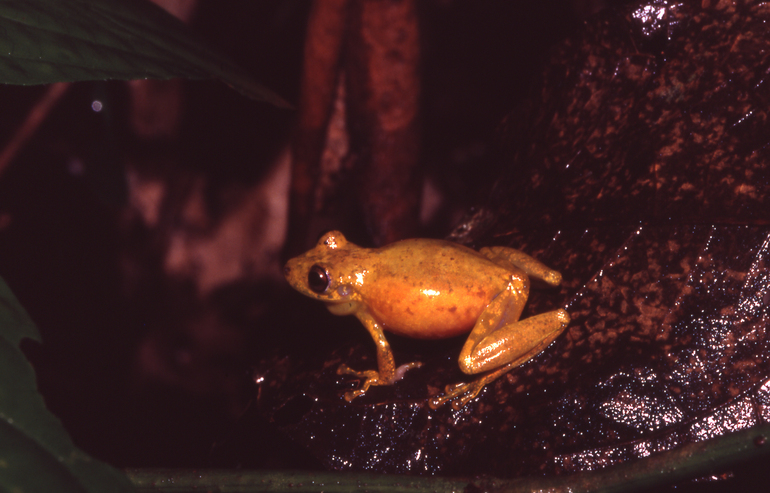

Conservation status
- Least Concern (IUCN 3.1)

Scientific classification
- Kingdom: Animalia
- Phylum: Chordata
- Class: Amphibia
- Order: Anura
- Family: Hylidae
- Genus: Scinax
- Species: S. cruentomma

Binomial name
- Scinax cruentomma (Duellman, 1972)

Synonyms
- Hyla cruentomma Duellman, 1972; Ololygon cruentoma (Duellman, 1972); Scinax cruentommus (Duellman, 1972)

= Scinax cruentomma =

Species of frog

Scinax cruentomma is a species of frog in the family Hylidae. It is found in the upper Amazon Basin of southern Colombia, eastern Ecuador, northeastern and east-central Peru, and western Brazil; its presence is French Guiana is disputed. The specific name cruentomma is derived from the Greek cruentos meaning "bloody" and omma meaning "eye", referring to the red streak in the eye of this frog. This species is also known as the Manaus snouted treefrog.

== Description ==
Adult males measure 25–28 mm (1.0–1.1 in) and adult females 26–31 mm (1.0–1.2 in) in snout–vent length. The snout is rounded. The tympanum is distinct. The fingers lack webbing whereas the toes are half-webbed. Skin is smooth to finely shagreened. The dorsum has creamy tan to uniform dark brown coloration, usually with brown markings. These that typically consist of canthal stripe, supratympanic stripe, and irregular (often longitudinal) marks on body. About half of the individuals have transverse bars on the limbs. The flanks are pale with or without small dark spots. The iris is silvery bronze and has a median horizontal red streak.

A Gosner stage 30 tadpole has body length of 8.8 mm (0.3 in) and total length of 28 mm (1.1 in).

The male advertisement call is a single, moderately long, poorly modulated, fast-pulsed note.

== Habitat and conservation ==
Scinax cruentomma occurs near temporary waterbodies in lowland tropical rainforest or rainforest edges, but reaching altitudes as high as 1,200 m (3,900 ft) in major river valleys. It has also been found in secondary forest and banana grove habitats. Breeding takes place in ponds both in clearings and in the forest. It is an abundant and adaptable species that is not facing significant threats.
