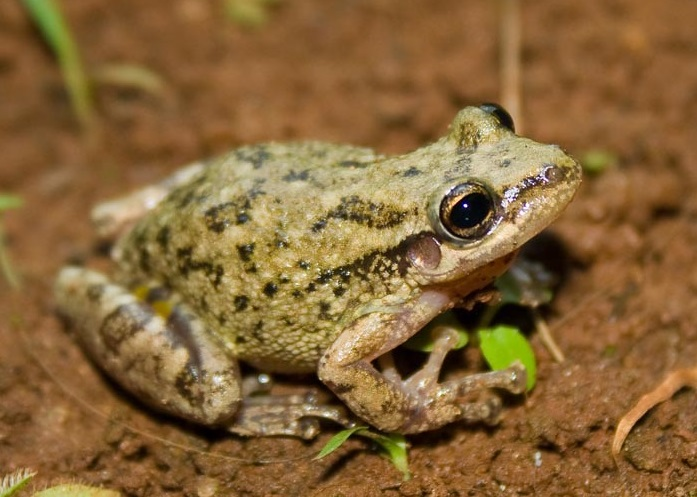

Conservation status
- Least Concern (IUCN 3.1)

Scientific classification
- Kingdom: Animalia
- Phylum: Chordata
- Class: Amphibia
- Order: Anura
- Family: Hylidae
- Genus: Scinax
- Species: S. similis

Binomial name
- Scinax similis (Cochran, 1952)

= Scinax similis =

Species of frog

Scinax similis is a species of frog in the family Hylidae. It is endemic to Brazil. Its natural habitats are moist savanna, subtropical or tropical dry lowland grassland, swamps, intermittent freshwater marshes, pastureland, rural gardens, urban areas, heavily degraded former forest, and ponds.
