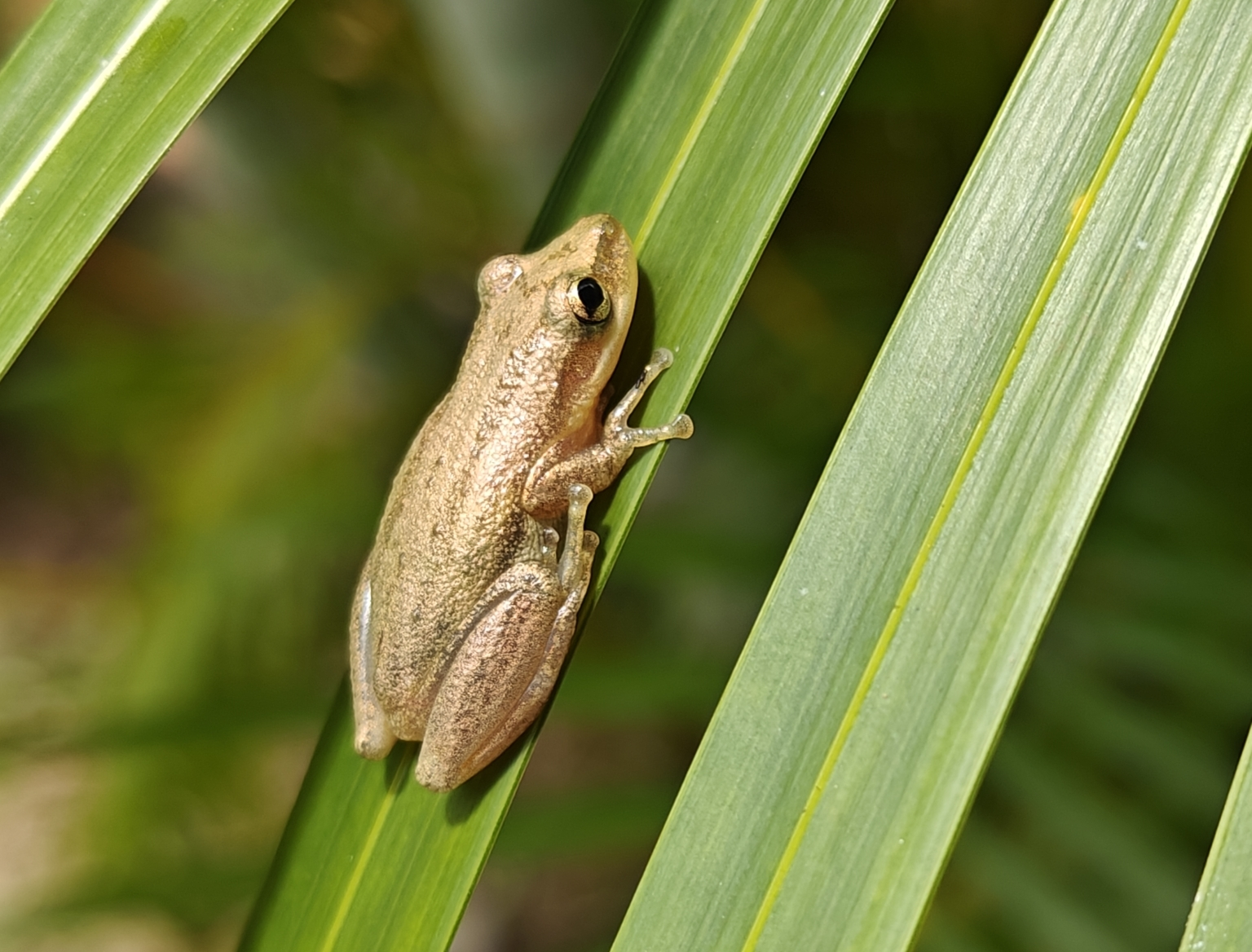

Conservation status
- Least Concern (IUCN 3.1)

Scientific classification
- Kingdom: Animalia
- Phylum: Chordata
- Class: Amphibia
- Order: Anura
- Family: Hylidae
- Genus: Scinax
- Species: S. altae

Binomial name
- Scinax altae (Dunn, 1933)

Synonyms
- Hyla altae Dunn, 1933; Hyla staufferi altae –León, 1969

= Scinax altae =

Species of frog

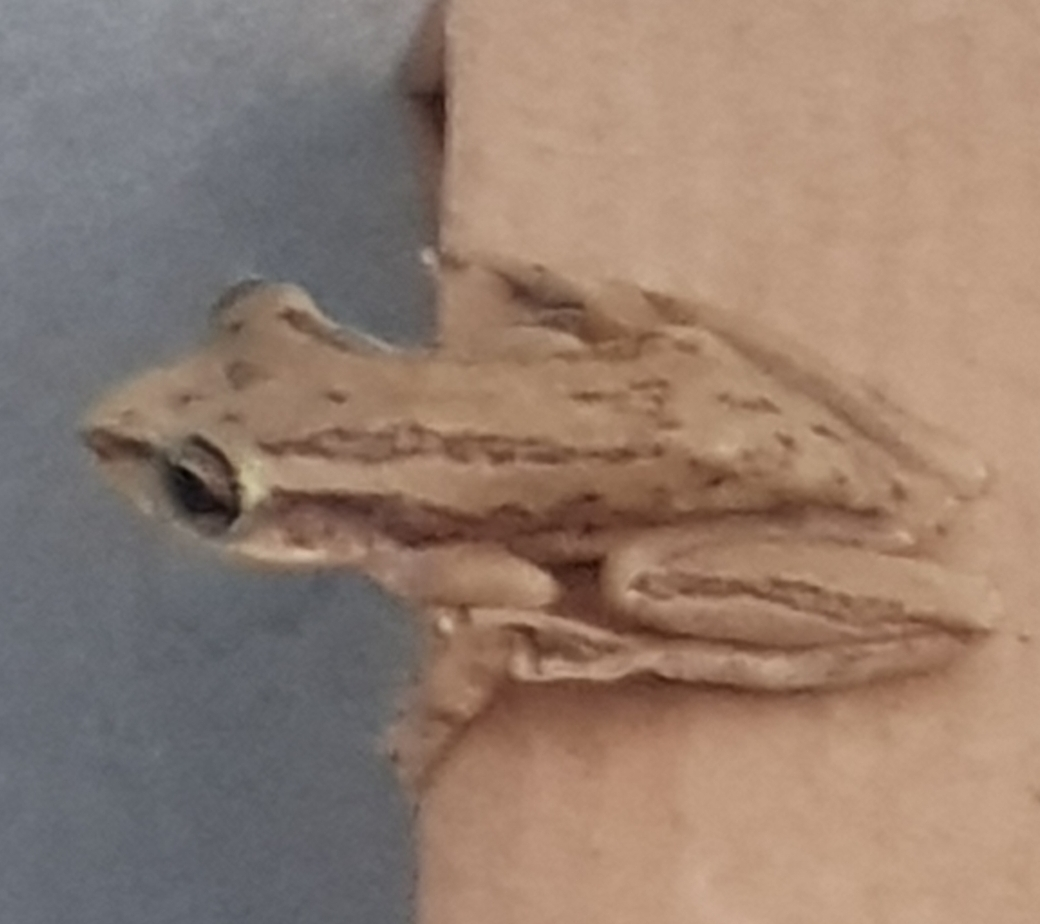
Scinax altae

Scinax altae is a species of frog in the family Hylidae. It is endemic to Panama where it occurs in the Pacific lowlands between the Chiriquí Province in the west and Panamá Province in the east. The type series was collected by Emmett Reid Dunn and his wife from "Summit" in the Panama Canal Zone in 1932.

== Description ==
Males measure 22–27 mm (0.87–1.06 in) in snout–vent length; females can grow to 27 mm (1.1 in). The snout is long and flat. The tympanum is distinct. The dorsum is gray to brownish gray and has four complete stripes (two dorsolateral and two paravertebral stripes; dorsal stripes are incomplete in a small fraction of individuals). The shanks have dark gray longitudinal stripes. The fingers are without webbing whereas the toes are about three fifths webbed. Males have a very large vocal sac.

== Habitat and conservation ==
The species' natural habitats are xeric, scrubby forests and savannas at elevations up to 700 m (2,300 ft) above sea level. It is locally common. Major threats to it are infrastructure development and water pollution. It occurs in the Altos de Campana National Park.
