= Scinax pachycrus =

Conservation status
- Least Concern (IUCN 3.1)

Scientific classification
- Kingdom: Animalia
- Phylum: Chordata
- Class: Amphibia
- Order: Anura
- Family: Hylidae
- Genus: Scinax
- Species: S. pachycrus

Binomial name
- Scinax pachycrus (Miranda-Ribeiro, 1937)

Species of frog

Scinax pachycrus is a species of frog in the family Hylidae. It is endemic to Brazil. Its natural habitats are dry savanna, subtropical or tropical dry shrubland, subtropical or tropical dry lowland grassland, intermittent freshwater marshes, rocky areas, arable land, pastureland, and ponds. It is threatened by habitat loss.
