= Scinax kennedyi =

Conservation status
- Least Concern (IUCN 3.1)

Scientific classification
- Kingdom: Animalia
- Phylum: Chordata
- Class: Amphibia
- Order: Anura
- Family: Hylidae
- Genus: Scinax
- Species: S. kennedyi

Binomial name
- Scinax kennedyi (Pyburn, 1973)

Species of frog

Scinax kennedyi is a species of frog in the family Hylidae. It is found in Colombia and Venezuela. Its natural habitats are moist savanna, subtropical or tropical dry lowland grassland, subtropical or tropical seasonally wet or flooded lowland grassland, freshwater marshes, intermittent freshwater marshes, freshwater springs, and pastureland. It is threatened by habitat loss.
