= Scinax madeirae =

Scientific classification
- Kingdom: Animalia
- Phylum: Chordata
- Class: Amphibia
- Order: Anura
- Family: Hylidae
- Genus: Scinax
- Species: S. madeirae

Binomial name
- Scinax madeirae (Bokermann, 1964)

Synonyms
- Hyla madeirae Bokermann, 1964; Scinax madeira Brusquetti, Jansen, Barrio-Amorós, Segalla, and Haddad, 2014

Species of frog

Scinax madeirae is a frog in the family Hylidae. It is endemic to Brazil and Bolivia.
