= Scinax ictericus =

Conservation status
- Least Concern (IUCN 3.1)

Scientific classification
- Kingdom: Animalia
- Phylum: Chordata
- Class: Amphibia
- Order: Anura
- Family: Hylidae
- Genus: Scinax
- Species: S. ictericus

Binomial name
- Scinax ictericus Duellman & Wiens, 1993

Species of frog

Scinax ictericus is a species of frog in the family Hylidae. It is found in Colombia, Peru, possibly Bolivia, and possibly Brazil. Its natural habitats are subtropical or tropical moist lowland forests and intermittent freshwater marshes. It is threatened by habitat loss.
