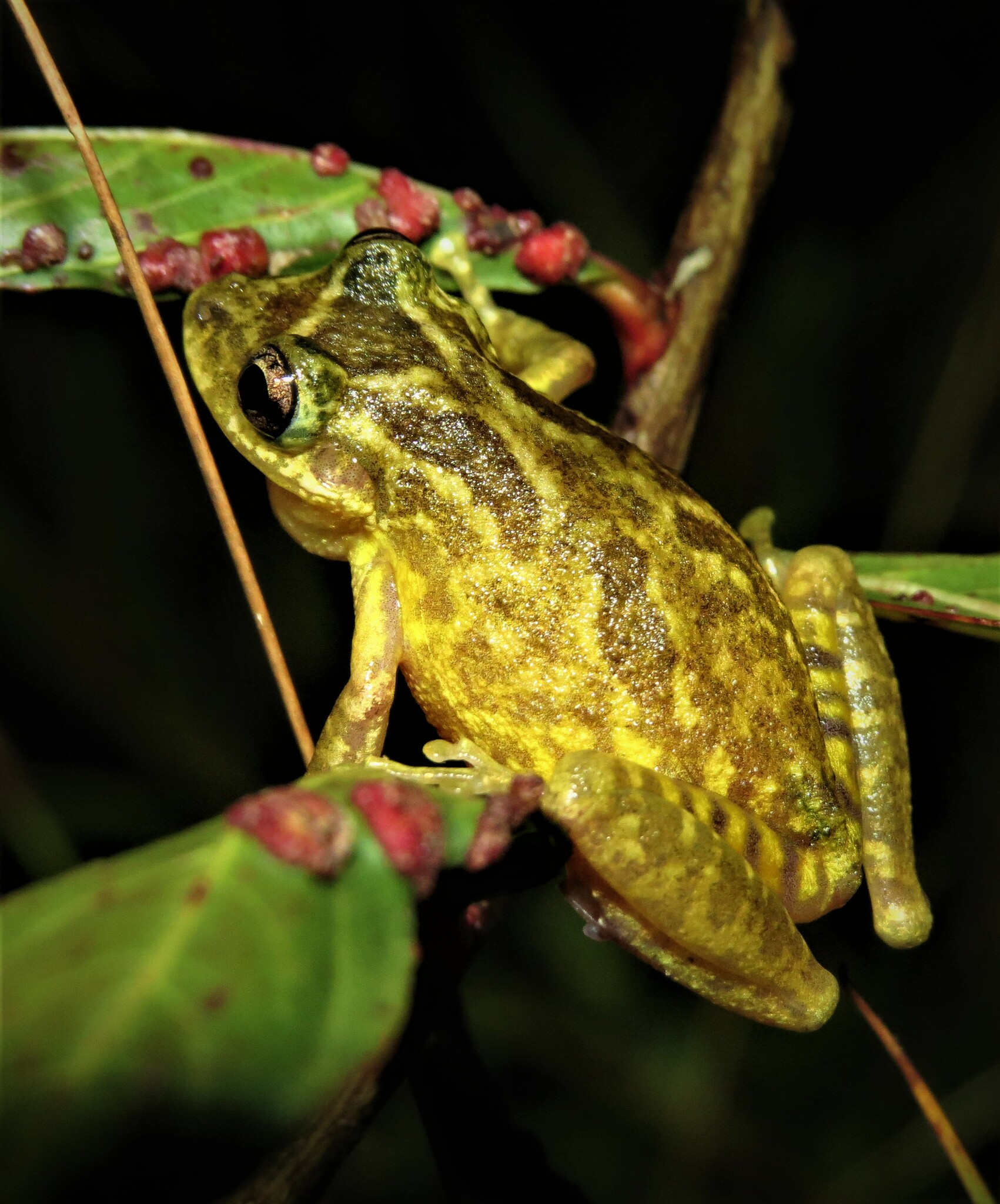

Scientific classification
- Kingdom: Animalia
- Phylum: Chordata
- Class: Amphibia
- Order: Anura
- Family: Hylidae
- Genus: Scinax
- Species: S. rogerioi

Binomial name
- Scinax rogerioi Pugliese, Baêta, and Pombal, 2009

= Scinax rogerioi =

Species of frog

Scinax cabralensis is a species of frog in the family Hylidae. It is endemic to Brazil. Scientists observed some of these frogs 1070 meters above sea level.

== Morphology ==
The adult male frog measures 25.0 to 35.6 mm in snout-vent length and the adult female frog 28.0 to 34.5 mm. Its head is as wide as its body in the dorsal view, and its tongue is large and round. It has disks on its toes for climbing.

This frog is light yellow-green or gray-green in color on the dorsum with dark brown spots. Its iris is copper colored.

== Reproduction ==
This frog is an explosive breeder, laying eggs after it rains. The males have been observed on short vegetation, rocks, or the ground when calling.

== Conservation ==
Some of these frogs live in protected areas, such as the Parque Estadual do Itacolomi in Minas Gerais.

== Etymology ==
The scientists who composed the original description of this frog named it after "our friend and colleague" Dr. Rogério P. Bastos of the Universidade Federal de Goiás, for his contribution to the knowledge of Brazilian frogs and toads.
