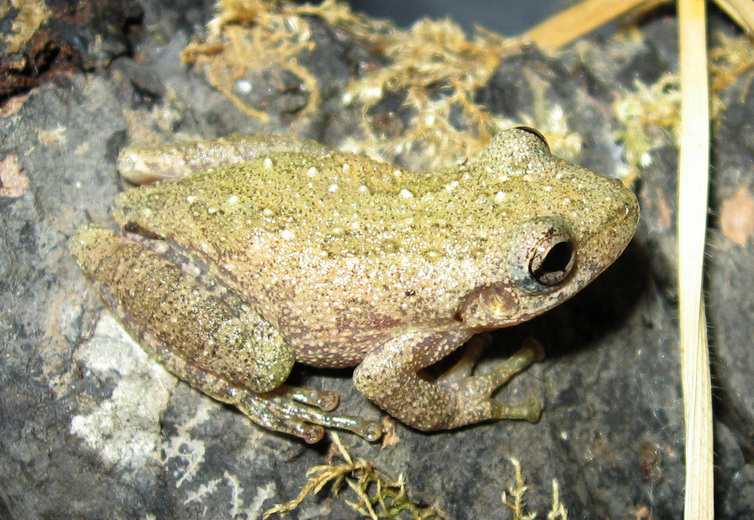

Conservation status
- Least Concern (IUCN 3.1)

Scientific classification
- Kingdom: Animalia
- Phylum: Chordata
- Class: Amphibia
- Order: Anura
- Family: Hylidae
- Genus: Scinax
- Species: S. granulatus

Binomial name
- Scinax granulatus (Gallardo, 1961)

Synonyms
- Hyla strigilata ssp. eringiophila Gallardo, 1961

= Scinax granulatus =

Species of frog

Scinax granulatus is a species of frog in the family Hylidae. It is found in Argentina, Brazil, Paraguay, and Uruguay. Its natural habitats are temperate shrubland, subtropical or tropical moist shrubland, temperate grassland, subtropical or tropical seasonally wet or flooded lowland grassland, freshwater lakes, freshwater marshes, intermittent freshwater marshes, pastureland, plantations, rural gardens, urban areas, water storage areas, ponds, and canals and ditches.
