= Scinax karenanneae =

Conservation status
- Least Concern (IUCN 3.1)

Scientific classification
- Kingdom: Animalia
- Phylum: Chordata
- Class: Amphibia
- Order: Anura
- Family: Hylidae
- Genus: Scinax
- Species: S. karenanneae

Binomial name
- Scinax karenanneae (Pyburn, 1993)

Species of frog

Scinax karenanneae is a species of frog in the family Hylidae. It is endemic to Colombia. Its natural habitats are subtropical or tropical moist lowland forests, rivers, freshwater marshes, and intermittent freshwater marshes. It is threatened by habitat loss.
