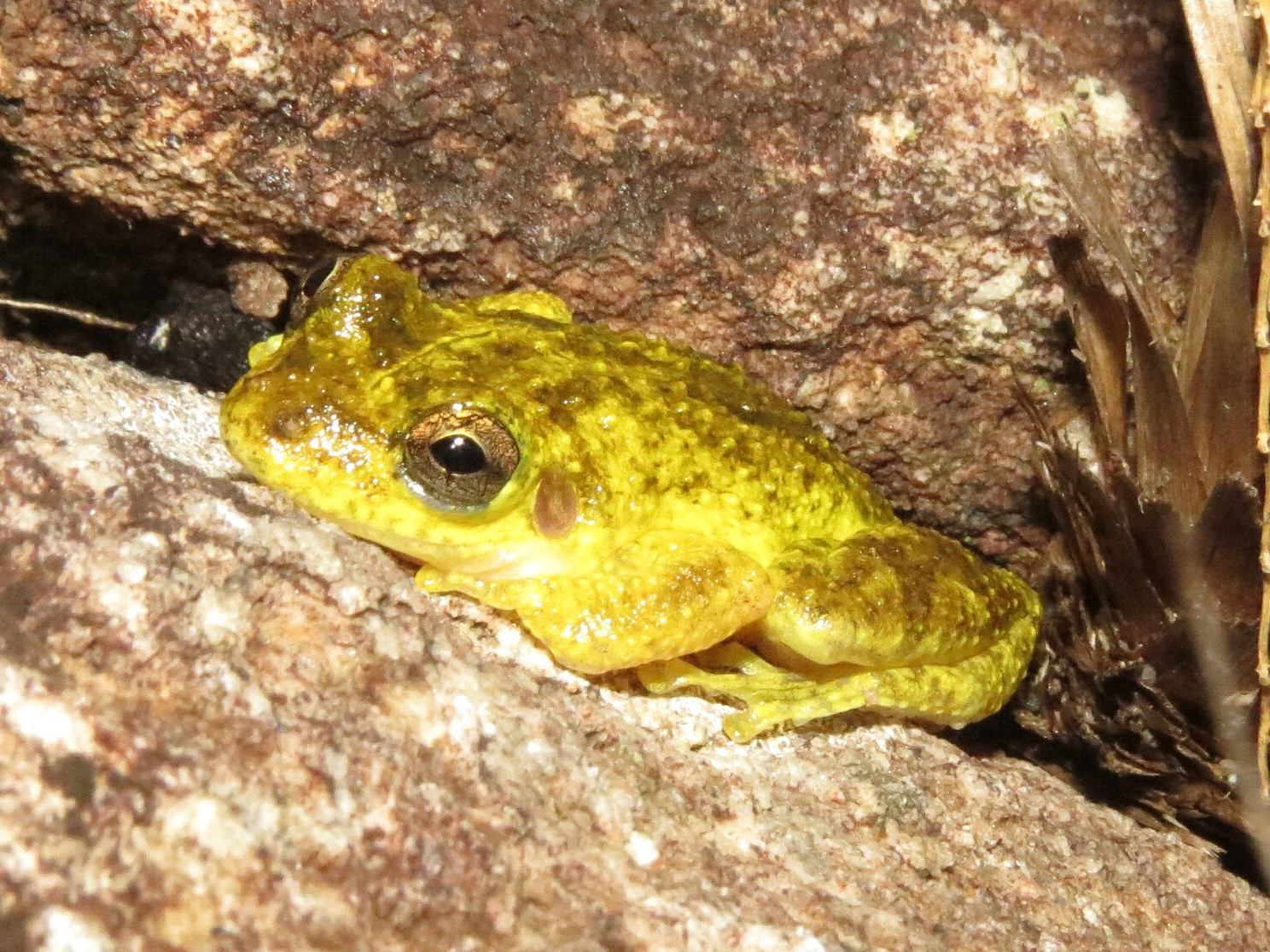

Scientific classification
- Kingdom: Animalia
- Phylum: Chordata
- Class: Amphibia
- Order: Anura
- Family: Hylidae
- Genus: Scinax
- Species: S. rupestris

Binomial name
- Scinax rupestris Araujo-Vieira, Brandão, and Faria, 2015

= Scinax rupestris =

Species of frog

Scinax rupestris, the Veadeiros snouted tree frog, is a species of frog in the family Hylidae. It is endemic to Brazil and has been found in the state of Goiás.

This frog favors temporary streams and rivulets over 1000 meters above sea level, in areas rich in quartzite.

The adult male frog measures 21.9 to 27.7 mm in snout-vent length and the adult female frog is 26.7 to 31.7 mm. The iris of its eye is iridescent yellow. There is a keratinized spike behind the jaw.
