= Scinax caprarius =

Scientific classification
- Kingdom: Animalia
- Phylum: Chordata
- Class: Amphibia
- Order: Anura
- Family: Hylidae
- Genus: Scinax
- Species: S. caprarius

Binomial name
- Scinax caprarius Acosta-Galvis, 2018

Species of tree frog

Scinax caprarius, the Canastra snouted tree frog, is a species of frog in the family Hylidae. It is endemic to sub-Andean hills in Colombia. Scientists have seen it between 900 and 1300 meters above sea level, in areas with 2800 to 5000 mm of annual rainfall.

The adult frog measures 28.6 to 31.1 mm long in snout-vent length. The male frog's advertisement call resembles a goat's bleat.
