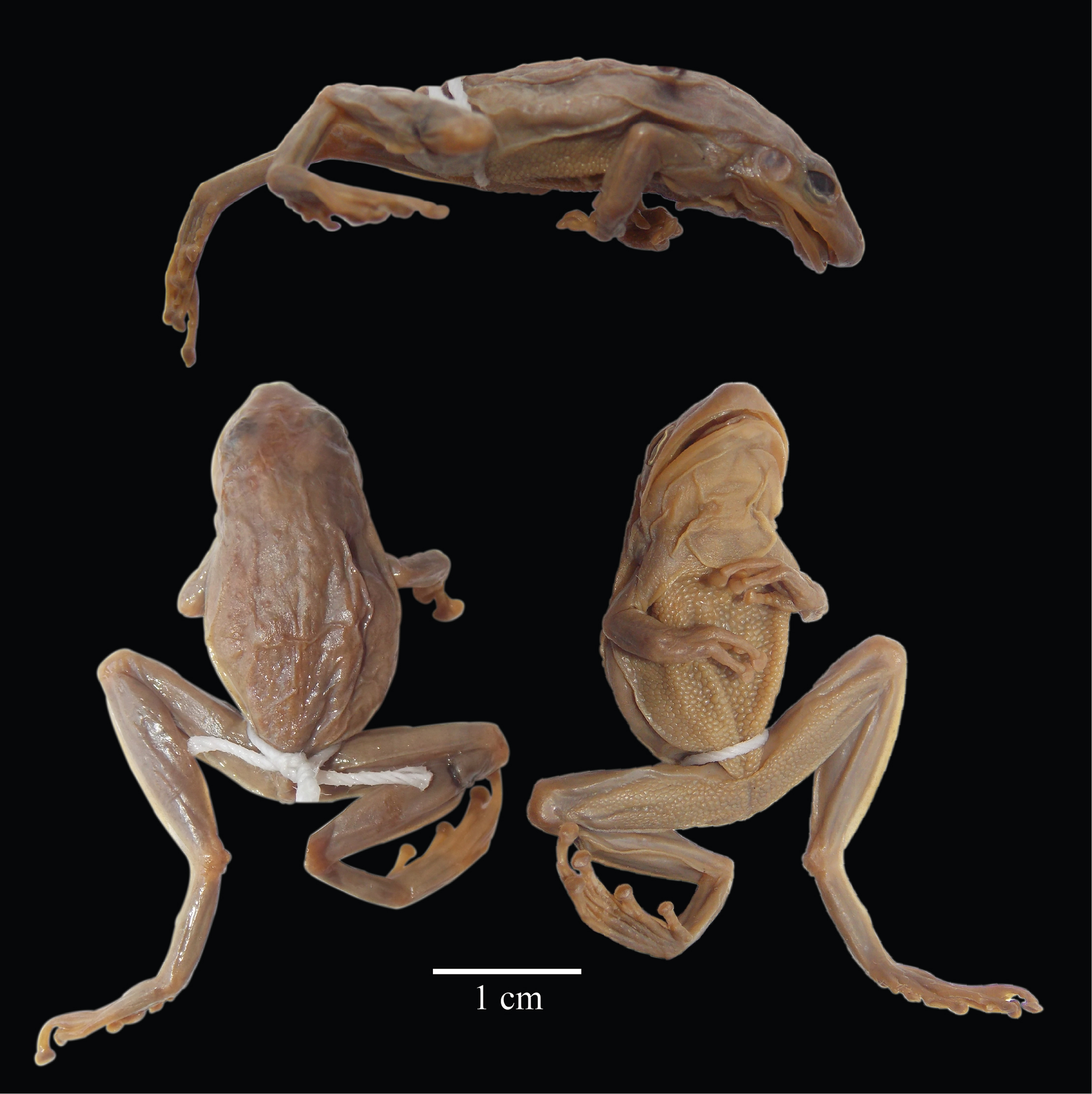

Conservation status
- Least Concern (IUCN 3.1)

Scientific classification
- Kingdom: Animalia
- Phylum: Chordata
- Class: Amphibia
- Order: Anura
- Family: Hylidae
- Genus: Scinax
- Species: S. quinquefasciatus

Binomial name
- Scinax quinquefasciatus (Fowler, 1913)

= Scinax quinquefasciatus =

Species of frog

Scinax quinquefasciatus is a species of frog, in the tree frog family, Hylidae. It is found in Colombia and Ecuador, including on the Galápagos Islands (San Cristóbal, Santa Cruz, Santiago Islands).

Its natural habitats are subtropical to tropical dry forests or moist lowland forests, or moist shrubland, as well as intermittent freshwater marshes, plantations, rural gardens, urban areas, heavily degraded former forest, ponds, lakes, canals and ditches.
