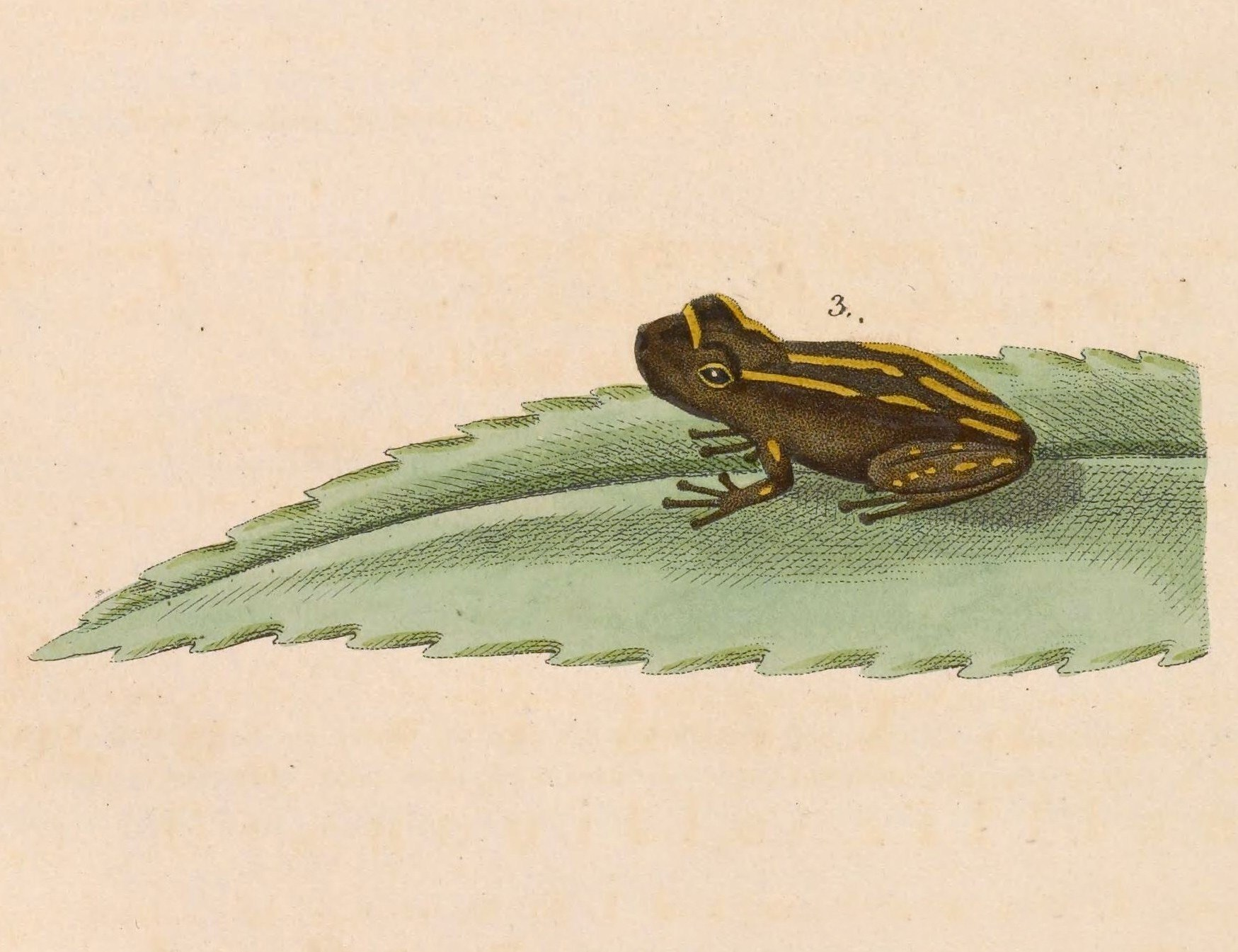

Conservation status
- Least Concern (IUCN 3.1)

Scientific classification
- Kingdom: Animalia
- Phylum: Chordata
- Class: Amphibia
- Order: Anura
- Family: Hylidae
- Genus: Scinax
- Species: S. auratus

Binomial name
- Scinax auratus (Wied-Neuwied, 1821)

= Scinax auratus =

Species of frog

Scinax auratus is a species of frog in the family Hylidae. It is endemic to Brazil. Its natural habitats are subtropical or tropical moist lowland forests, subtropical or tropical moist shrubland, freshwater marshes, intermittent freshwater marshes, rocky areas, and heavily degraded former forest. It is threatened by habitat loss.
