= Scinax danae =

Conservation status
- Data Deficient (IUCN 3.1)

Scientific classification
- Kingdom: Animalia
- Phylum: Chordata
- Class: Amphibia
- Order: Anura
- Family: Hylidae
- Genus: Scinax
- Species: S. danae

Binomial name
- Scinax danae (Duellman, 1986)

Synonyms
- Ololygon danae Duellman, 1986

Species of frog

Scinax danae is a species of frog in the family Hylidae. It is endemic to southeastern Venezuela and occurs in the La Escalera region of the Sierra de Lema, Bolívar state. The specific name danae honors Dana Trueb Duellman, the daughter William E. Duellman, the scientist who described this species. Despite this, common name Bolivar snouted treefrog has been coined for this species.

== Description ==
Adult males measure 25–27 mm (1.0–1.1 in) and adult females, based on two specimens only, 28–30 mm (1.1–1.2 in) in snout–vent length. The body is moderately robust and the head is longer than it is wide. The snout is subacuminate. The tympanum is distinct but partly covered by the supratympanic fold. The fingers have basal webbing whereas the toes are extensively webbed; both bear round discs at the tips of the digits. The coloration varies by time of day. At night, the dorsum is pale yellowish tan and has faint darker tan markings. The venter is creamy yellow and the vocal sac is bright yellow. By day, the dorsum becomes yellowish tan and has dark brown flecks; the limbs show transverse bars. The flanks are yellow with brown spots. The venter is creamy yellow. The iris is reddish bronze.

== Habitat and conservation ==
Scinax danae occurs in margins of temporary pools, small ponds, lagoons, and sluggish streams at elevations of 180–1,250 m (590–4,100 ft) above sea level. They are nocturnal. Males call from herbaceous vegetation and bushes. The tadpoles presumably develop in water.

Scinax danae is an uncommon species. It can potentially suffer from installation of power lines and the associated development, tourism, and fires, although these are unlikely to be serious threats. The range of this species includes the Canaima National Park.
