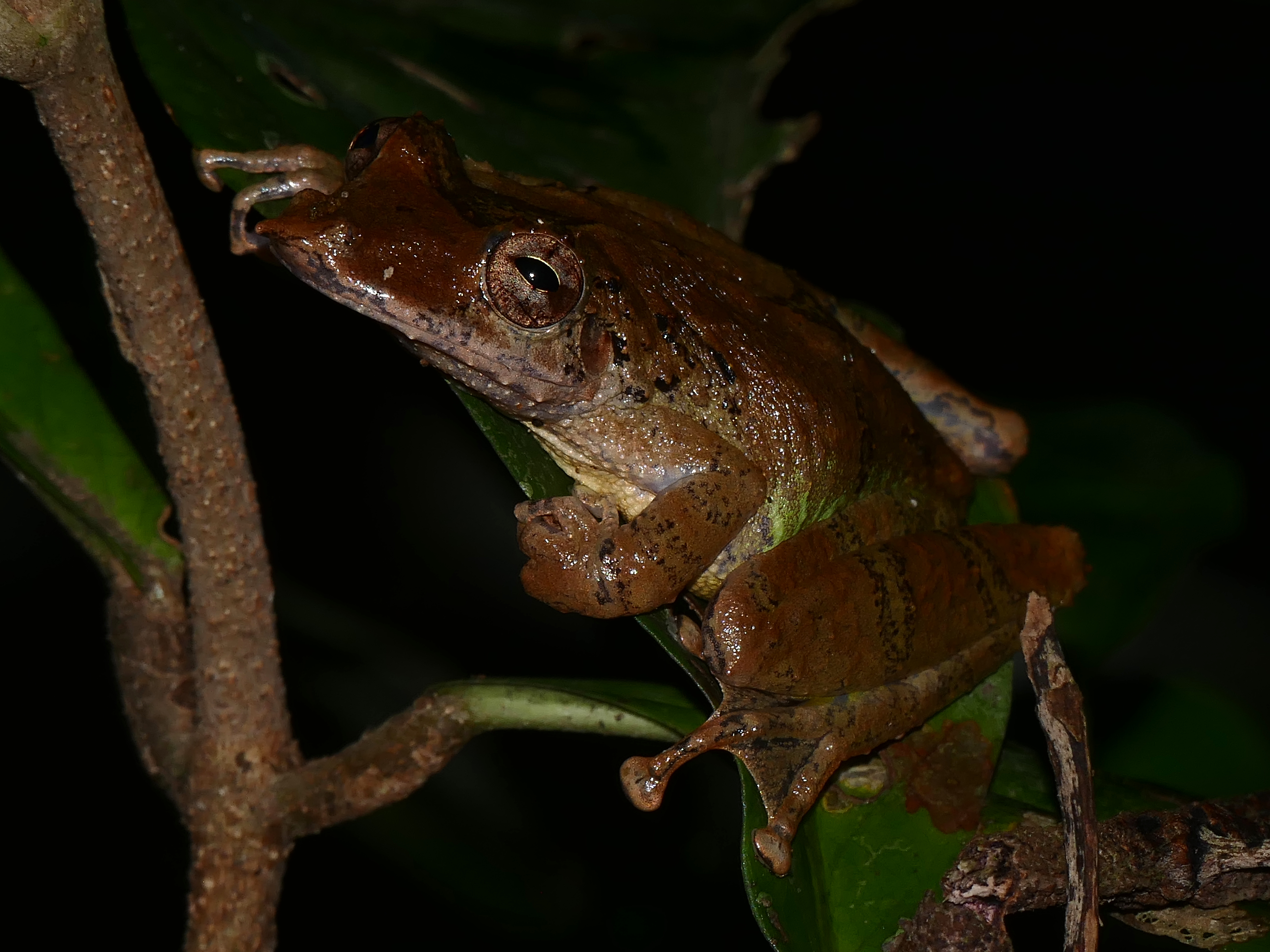

Conservation status
- Least Concern (IUCN 3.1)

Scientific classification
- Kingdom: Animalia
- Phylum: Chordata
- Class: Amphibia
- Order: Anura
- Family: Hylidae
- Genus: Scinax
- Species: S. proboscideus

Binomial name
- Scinax proboscideus (Brongersma, 1933)

= Scinax proboscideus =

Species of amphibian

Scinax proboscideus is a species of frog in the family Hylidae. It is found in French Guiana, Guyana, Suriname, and possibly Brazil. Its natural habitats are subtropical or tropical moist lowland forests and intermittent freshwater marshes.

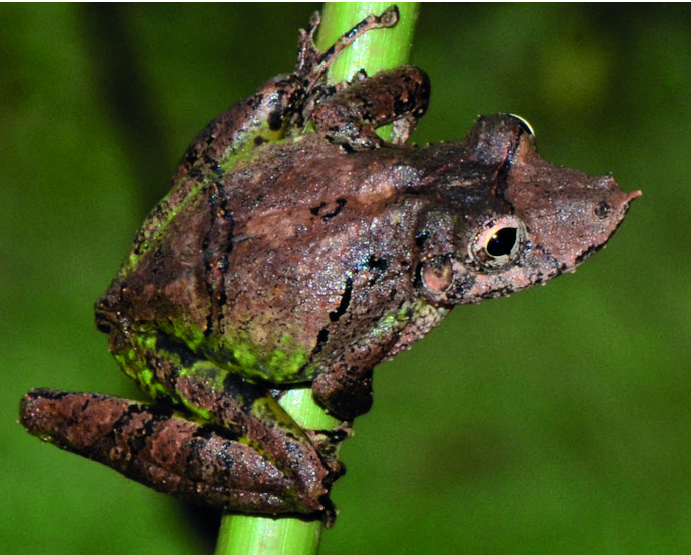
Amapá, Brazil
