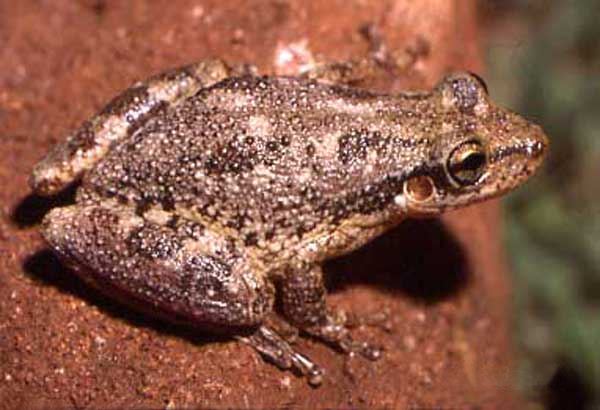

Conservation status
- Least Concern (IUCN 3.1)

Scientific classification
- Kingdom: Animalia
- Phylum: Chordata
- Class: Amphibia
- Order: Anura
- Family: Hylidae
- Genus: Scinax
- Species: S. nasicus

Binomial name
- Scinax nasicus (Cope, 1862)

Synonyms
- Hyla nigra Cope, 1887; Hylella anisitsi Méhelÿ, 1904

= Scinax nasicus =

Species of frog

Scinax nasicus is a species of frog in the family Hylidae. It is found in Argentina, Bolivia, Brazil, Paraguay, and Uruguay. Its natural habitats are subtropical or tropical dry forests, moist savanna, temperate shrubland, subtropical or tropical dry shrubland, subtropical or tropical moist shrubland, subtropical or tropical high-altitude shrubland, temperate grassland, subtropical or tropical seasonally wet or flooded lowland grassland, freshwater lakes, intermittent freshwater lakes, freshwater marshes, arable land, pastureland, plantations, rural gardens, heavily degraded former forest, water storage areas, ponds, and canals and ditches.
