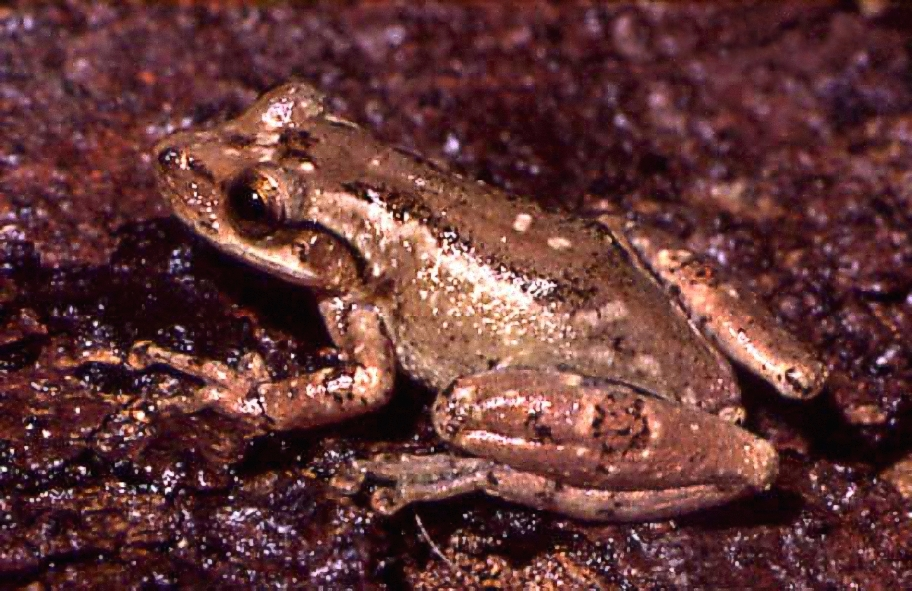

Conservation status
- Least Concern (IUCN 3.1)

Scientific classification
- Kingdom: Animalia
- Phylum: Chordata
- Class: Amphibia
- Order: Anura
- Family: Hylidae
- Genus: Scinax
- Species: S. alter

Binomial name
- Scinax alter (B. Lutz, 1973)

Synonyms
- Hyla rubra orientalis Lutz, 1968; Hyla rubra altera Lutz, 1973; Ololygon altera — Carvalho-e-Silva and Peixoto, 1991; Scinax altera — Pombal, Haddad, and Kasahara, 1995; Scinax alterus — Silvano and Pimenta, 2001; Scinax alter — Alves and Carvalho-e-Silva, 2002

= Scinax alter =

Crubixa snouted treefrog

Species of amphibian

Scinax alter, the Crubixa snouted treefrog, is a species of frog in the family Hylidae endemic to Brazil.

== Appearance ==
The adult male frog measures 22.5 to 31.1 mm long in snout-vent length and the adult female frog 23.9–31.0 mm.

Scientists distinguish this frog from related species by the bright white stripes, lined with dark brown, down the sides of its body. It also has a dark brown intraorbital blotch in the shape of an inverted triangle. It has small dark brown rostral stripes in front of its eyes. The insides of its back legs are lighter brown. The belly is yellow-brown. It has a slender body and protuberant eyes. It has vomerine teeth in its jaw.

The tadpole is 22.9 to 32.0 mm long, with the tail.

== Habitat ==
Its natural habitats are subtropical or tropical moist shrubland, subtropical or tropical seasonally wet or flooded lowland grassland, swamps, intermittent freshwater lakes, freshwater marshes, intermittent freshwater marshes, pastureland, and ponds. Most of these frogs live along the Atlantic Ocean in the east. Some of them live further away from the ocean in the Rio Doce valley in Minas Gerais. Others live higher up in the hills in Espírito Santo. They have been seen on arbustive plants near ponds in the edges of forests or open areas. They can live in habitats with sand dunes if there are tall enough plants growing in them. Scientists have noticed them both on the ground and in trees.
