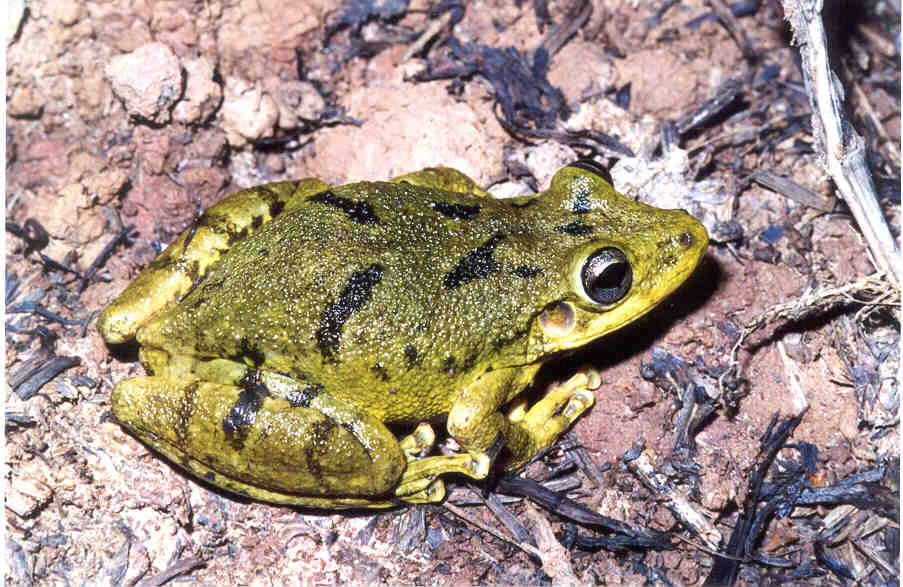

Conservation status
- Least Concern (IUCN 3.1)

Scientific classification
- Kingdom: Animalia
- Phylum: Chordata
- Class: Amphibia
- Order: Anura
- Family: Hylidae
- Genus: Scinax
- Species: S. fuscovarius

Binomial name
- Scinax fuscovarius (A. Lutz, 1925)

Synonyms
- Scinax megapodius (Miranda-Ribeiro, 1926); Scinax trachythorax (Müller & Hellmich, 1936)

= Scinax fuscovarius =

Species of frog

Scinax fuscovarius is a species of frog in the family Hylidae. It is found in Argentina, Bolivia, Brazil, Paraguay, and Uruguay. Its natural habitats are moist savanna, subtropical or tropical moist shrubland, subtropical or tropical high-altitude shrubland, subtropical or tropical dry lowland grassland, subtropical or tropical seasonally wet or flooded lowland grassland, intermittent freshwater lakes, freshwater marshes, intermittent freshwater marshes, pastureland, rural gardens, urban areas, and heavily degraded former forest.
