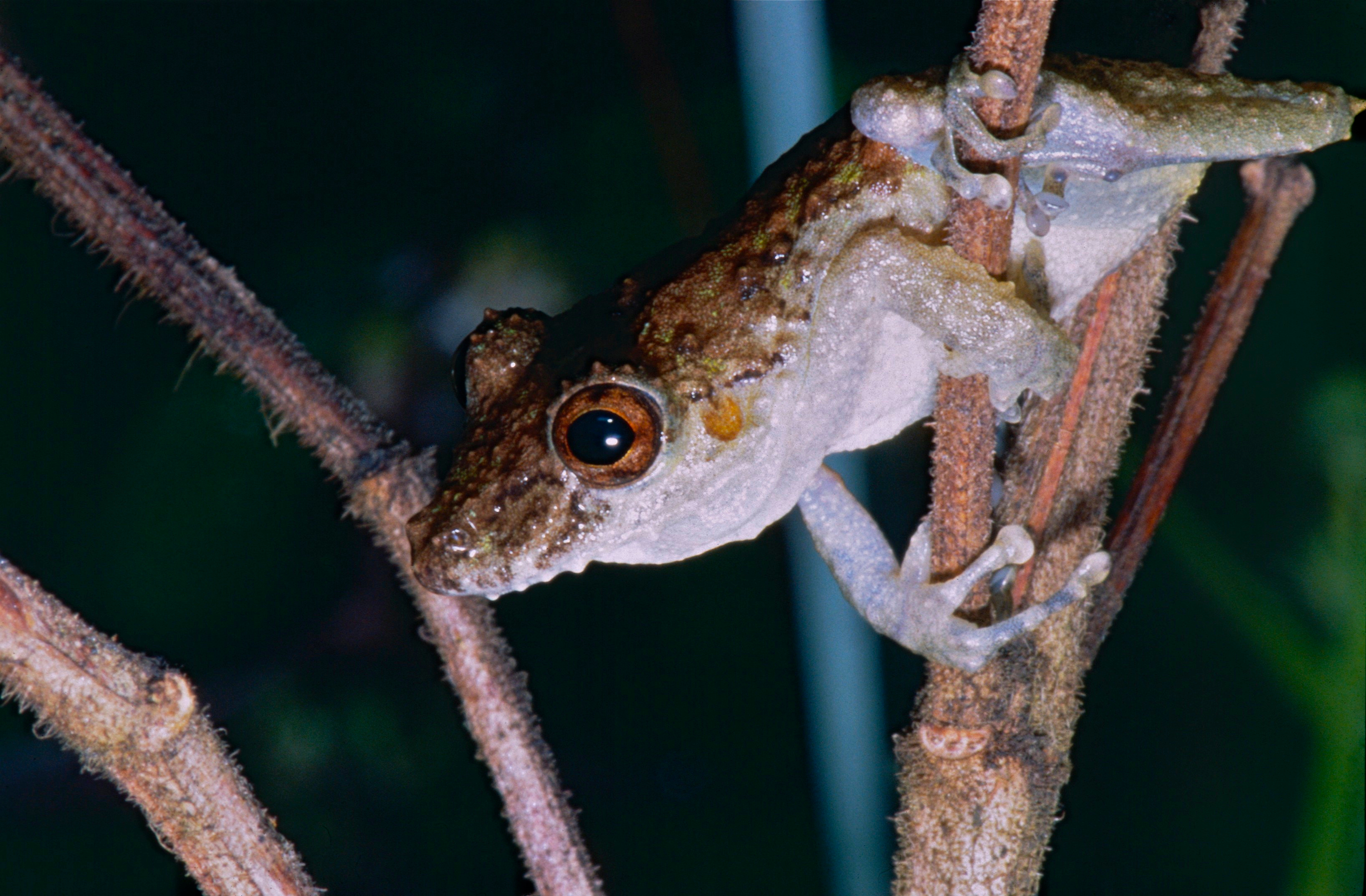
- Spix's Snouted Treefrog (Scinax nebulosus)

Conservation status
- Least Concern (IUCN 3.1)

Scientific classification
- Kingdom: Animalia
- Phylum: Chordata
- Class: Amphibia
- Order: Anura
- Family: Hylidae
- Genus: Scinax
- Species: S. nebulosus

Binomial name
- Scinax nebulosus (Spix, 1824)

Synonyms
- Hyla nebulosa (Spix, 1824); Hyla cynocephala (Duméril and Bibron, 1841); Hyla egleri (Lutz, 1968); Ololygon egleri (Fouquette and Delahoussaye, 1977); Hyla cyanocephala (Duellman, 1977); Ololygon cynocephala (Duellman, 1985); Scinax nebulosa (Duellman and Wiens, 1992); Scinax cynocephala (Duellman and Wiens, 1992); Scinax nebulosus (Köhler and Böhme, 1996); Scinax cynocephalus (Köhler and Böhme, 1996)

= Scinax nebulosus =

Species of frog

The blue-headed snouted tree frog or Spix's snouted tree frog (Scinax nebulosus) is a species of frog in the family Hylidae. It is found in Bolivia, Brazil, French Guiana, Guyana, Suriname, and Venezuela. Its natural habitats are subtropical or tropical moist lowland forests, moist savanna, intermittent freshwater marshes, pastureland, rural gardens, and heavily degraded former forest. It is threatened by habitat loss.

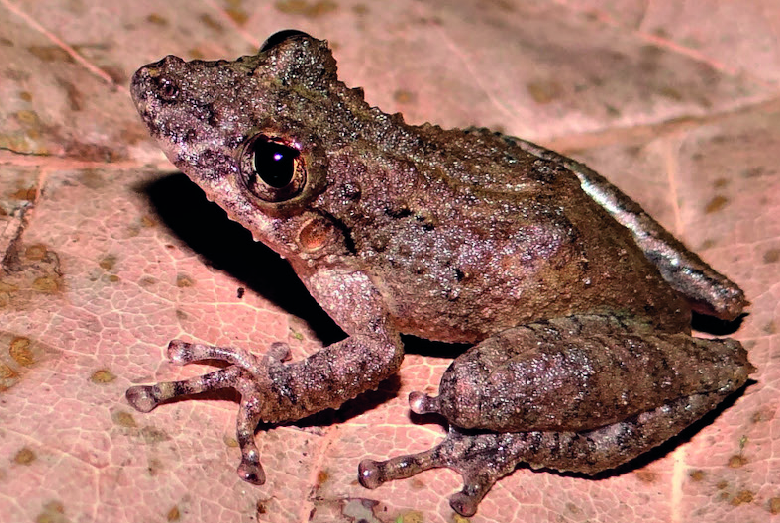
Amapá, Brazil
