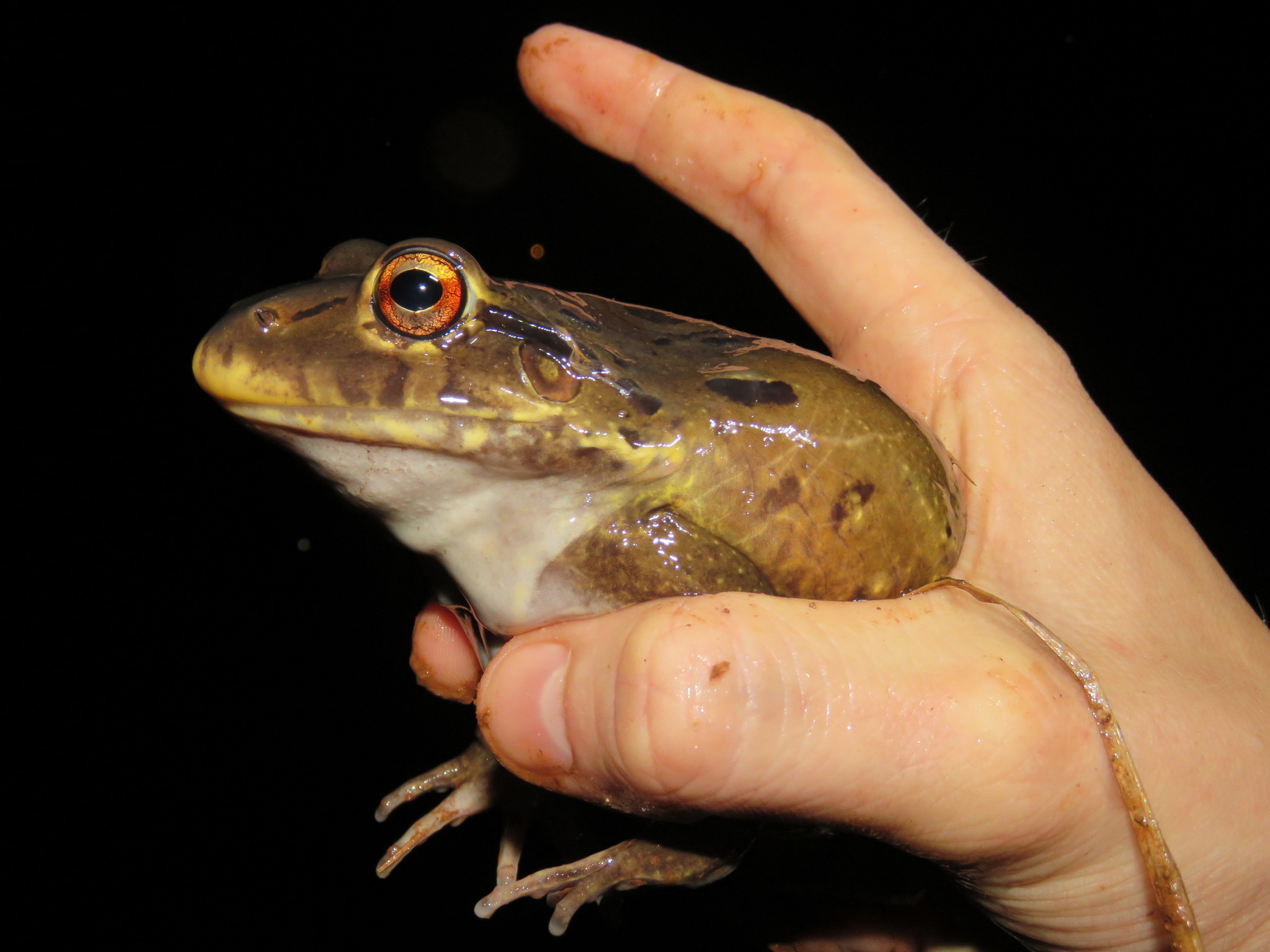
- Adult
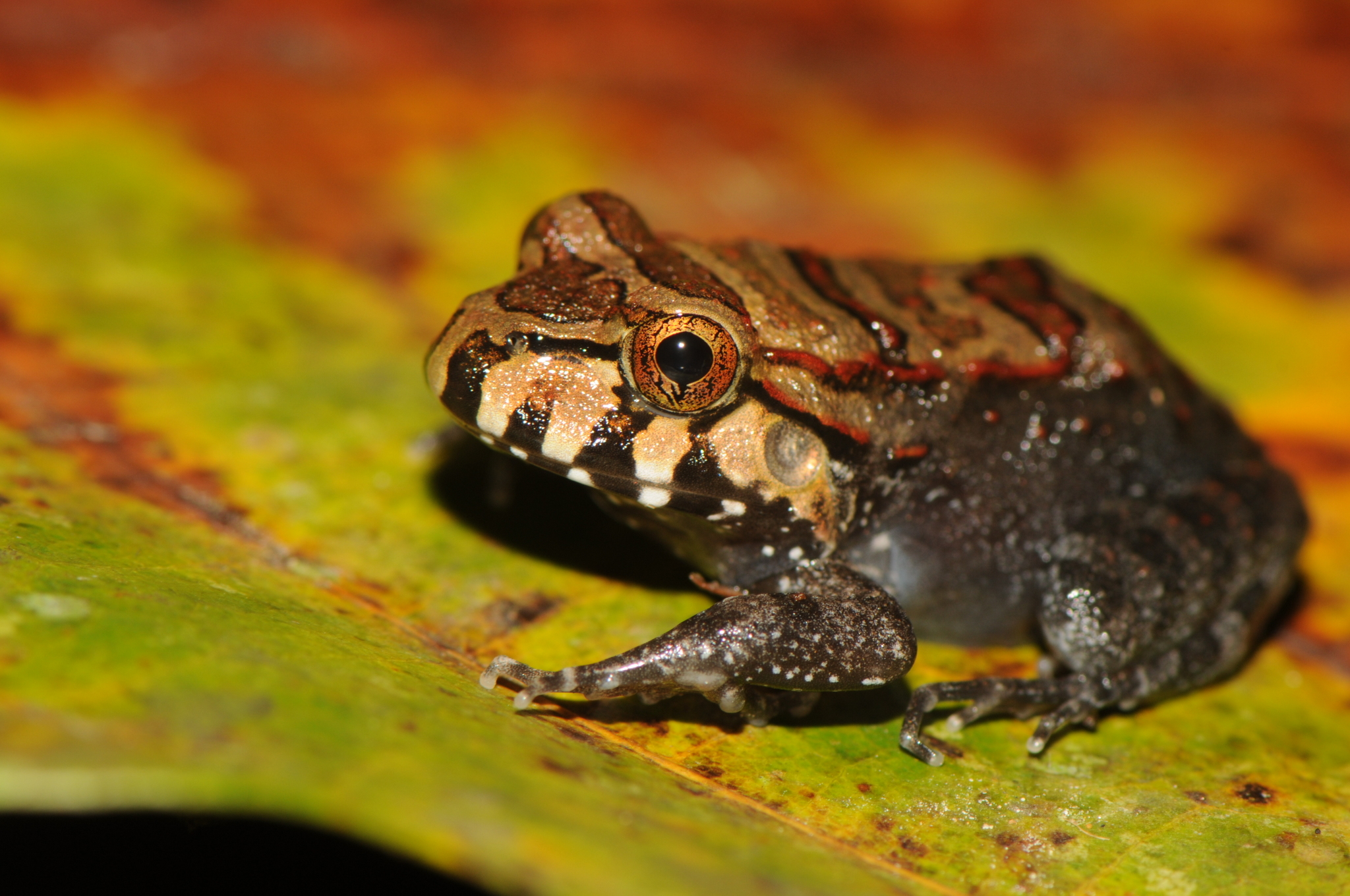
- Juvenile

Conservation status
- Least Concern (IUCN 3.1)

Scientific classification
- Kingdom: Animalia
- Phylum: Chordata
- Class: Amphibia
- Order: Anura
- Family: Leptodactylidae
- Genus: Leptodactylus
- Species: L. knudseni

Binomial name
- Leptodactylus knudseni Heyer, 1972

= Leptodactylus knudseni =

Species of frog

Leptodactylus knudseni, known commonly as Knudsen's frog, is a species of frog in the family Leptodactylidae. It is found in the greater Amazon basin.

== Taxonomy ==
The first description of the species was published by W. Ronald Heyer in 1972. The specific name, knudseni, is in honor of Jens W. Knudsen, who Heyer called "the most important influence in my decision to become a professional biologist" and said "continues to encourage my research efforts." The holotype was a juvenile female, with Heyer stating that he found the frog so distinctive that he preferred to describe it immediately rather than waiting for an adult specimen. It was collected from a decaying log in August 1970 by Heyer and Keith A. Berven, at an elevation of 260 m (850 ft), in Napo, Ecuador.

== Description and behaviour ==
Usual adult snout–vent lengths range between 94–170 mm (3.7–6.7 in) for males and 102.7–154 mm (4.04–6.06 in) for females. They have smooth bodies and wide heads, are orange-brown or greenish on top and have a white belly. They have triangular dark markings on their lips, light-colored lines above the lips, black lines from the nose going over each eye, markings between the eyes.The iris of the eye has a bronze coloration. Juveniles have yellow coloration on their heads.

The frogs have only been observed to reproduce in primary forest, where eggs are placed in foam nests and hatched tadpoles swim in shallow pools of water. They are usually found calling next to ephemeral or semi-ephemeral bodies of water.

== Distribution ==
L. knudseni is native to the greater Amazon basin, being found in Brazil, Bolivia, Colombia, Ecuador, French Guiana, Guyana, Peru, Suriname and Venezuela. A specimen was collected on the island of Trinidad in 1915, but the species current status on the island is unknown.

== Habitat ==
L. knudseni is terrestrial, being found on the forest floor and in burrows. It inhabits primary and secondary rainforest and savannas, at elevations of 0–1,800 m (0–5,906 ft).

The 2021 IUCN Red List assessment of L. knudseni deemed it to be a least-concern species due to its large range and moderate adaptability to human disturbance. The only threat listed was selective logging, which has a potential to affect tadpoles.

== Gallery ==
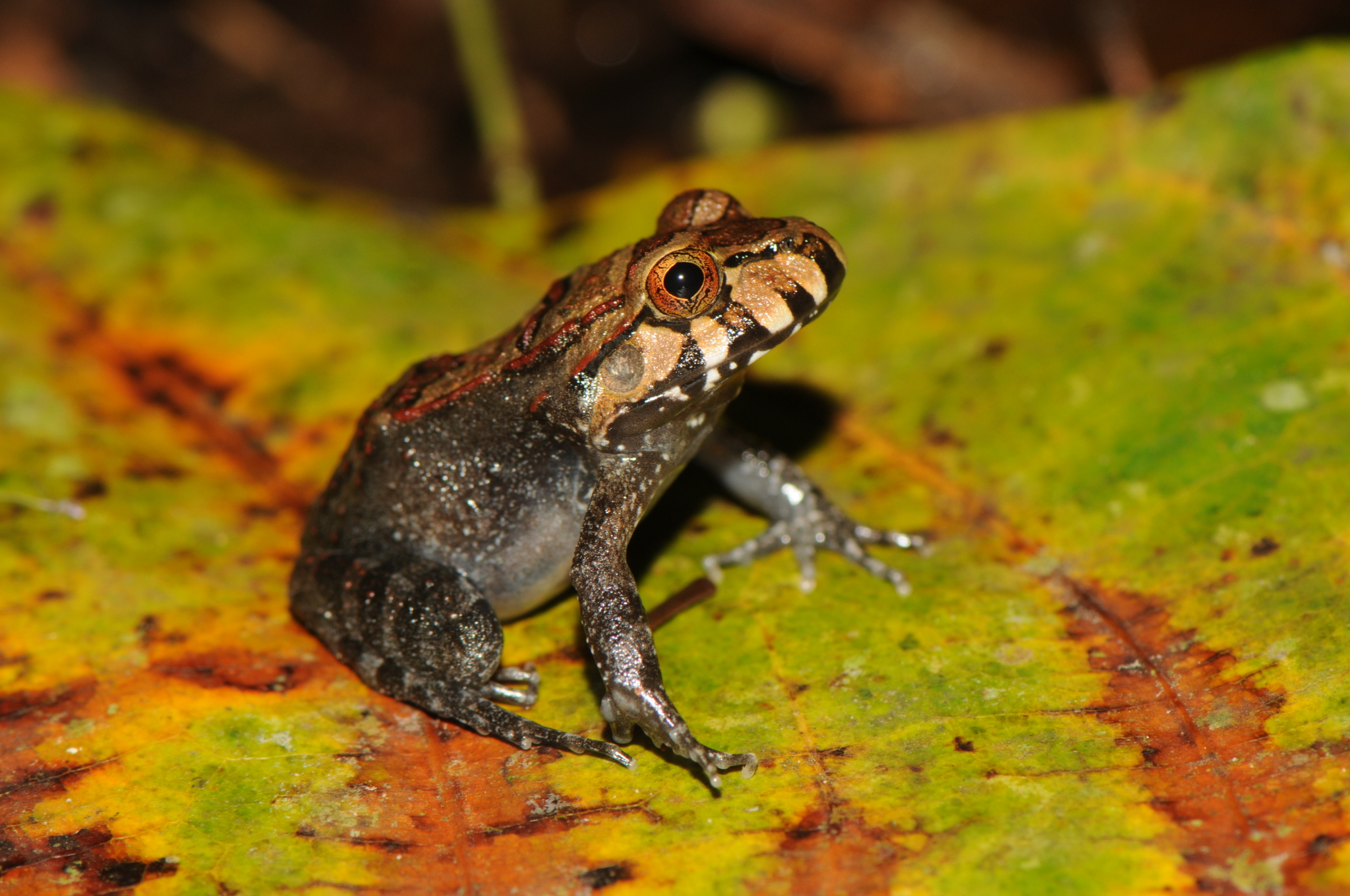

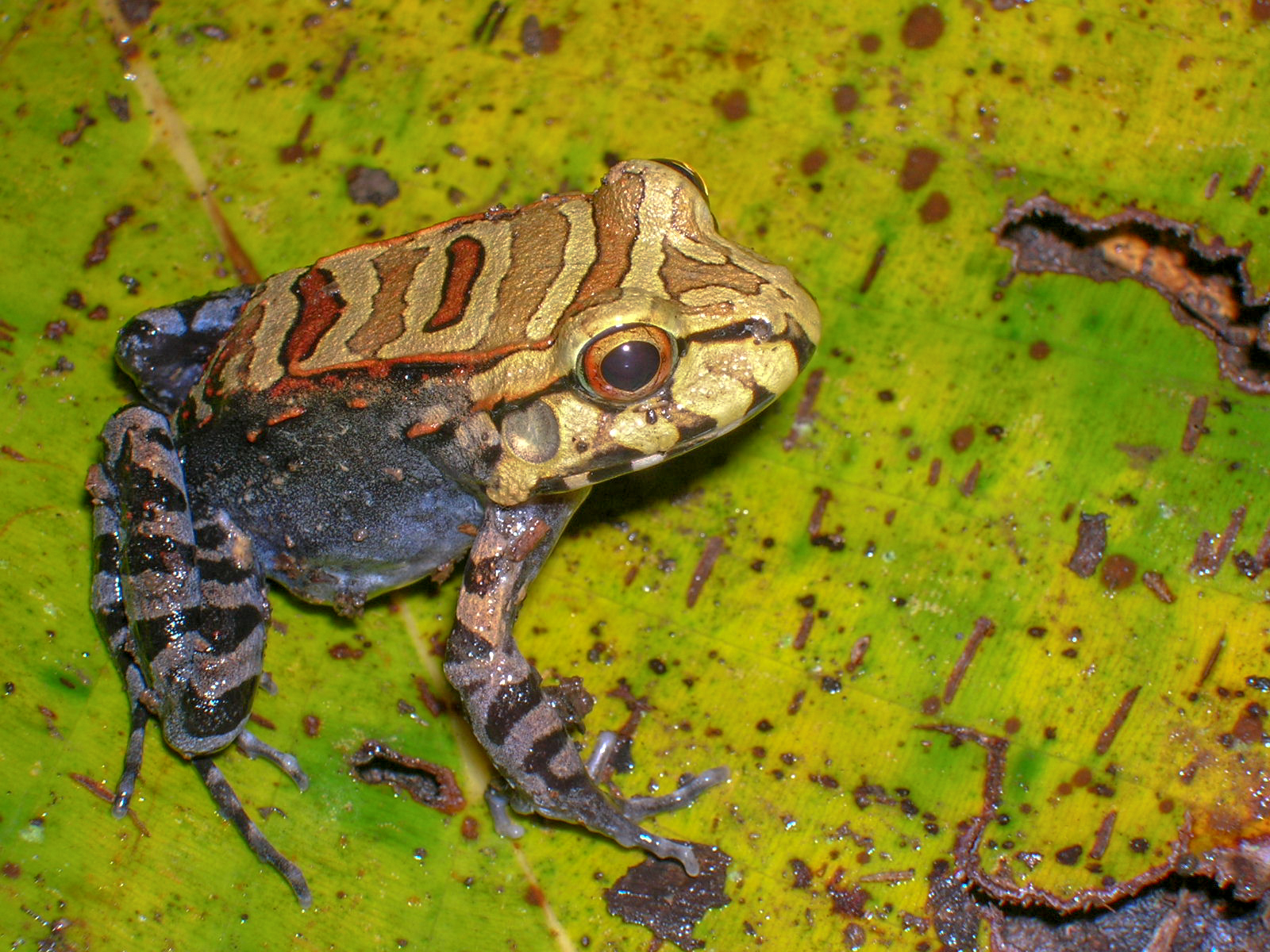

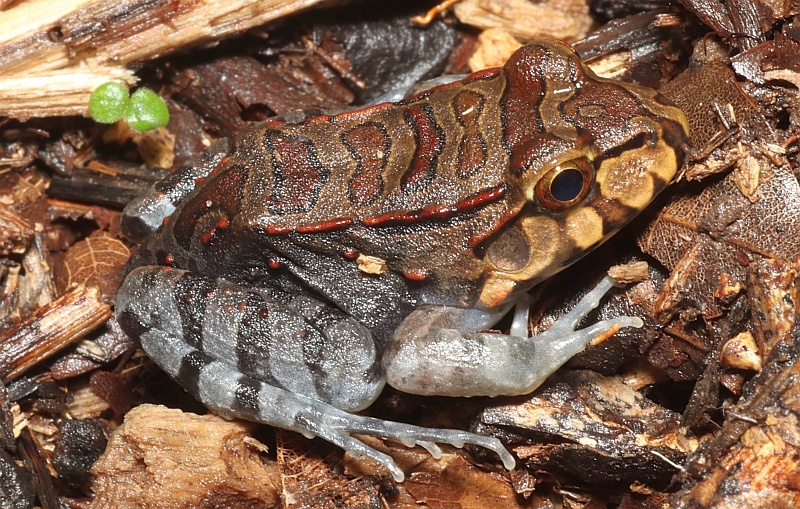

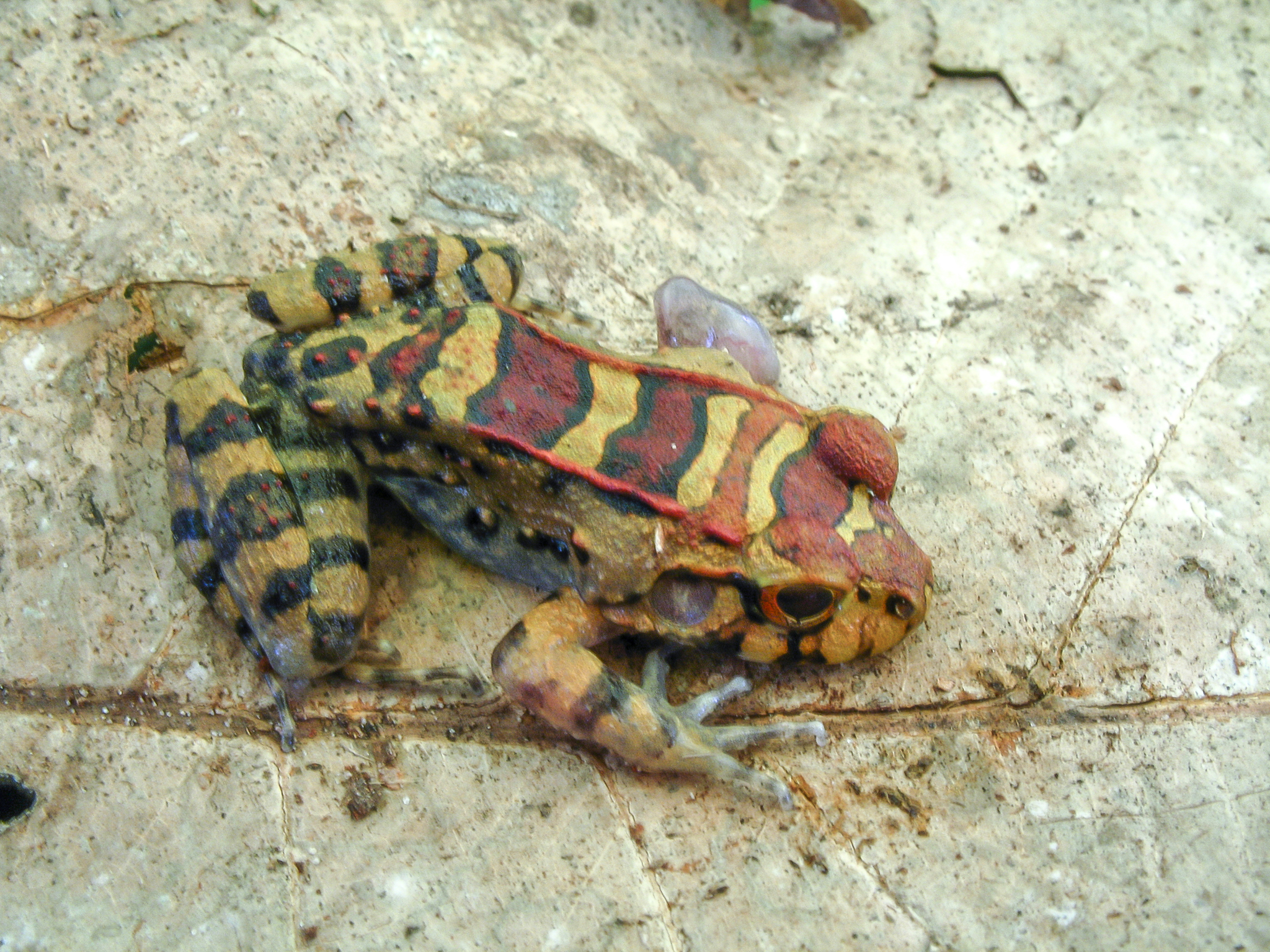
