= Leptodactylus flavopictus =

Conservation status
- Least Concern (IUCN 3.1)

Scientific classification
- Kingdom: Animalia
- Phylum: Chordata
- Class: Amphibia
- Order: Anura
- Family: Leptodactylidae
- Genus: Leptodactylus
- Species: L. flavopictus

Binomial name
- Leptodactylus flavopictus Lutz, 1926

Synonyms
- Leptodactylus flavopictus Lutz, 1926; Leptodactylus pachyderma Miranda-Ribeiro, 1926; Leptodactylus pentadactylus flavopictus Cochran, 1955 "1954"; Leptodactylus flavopictus Heyer, 1979

Species of amphibian

The yellow painted frog (Leptodactylus flavopictus) is a species of frogs in the family Leptodactylidae.

== Habitat ==
The adult frogs are terrestrial and have been reported in priary and secondary forest, near streams. This frog has shown some tolerance to anthropogenic disturbance. Scientists saw the frog between 0 and 800 meters above sea level.

Scientists have reported the frog in some protected areas: APA da Pedra Branca, Area Natural Tombada Serra do Mar e de Paranapiacaba, and PARES da Serra do Mar.

== Reproduction ==
The free-swimming tadpoles develop in water.

== Threats ==
The IUCN classifies this species as least concern of extinction. The frogs might be in some danger from habitat loss in favor of urbanization, silviculture, agriculture, and cattle pasturage.
