= Leptodactylus tapiti =

Conservation status
- Vulnerable (IUCN 3.1)

Scientific classification
- Kingdom: Animalia
- Phylum: Chordata
- Class: Amphibia
- Order: Anura
- Family: Leptodactylidae
- Genus: Leptodactylus
- Species: L. tapiti

Binomial name
- Leptodactylus tapiti Sazima & Bokermann, 1978

Species of frog

Leptodactylus tapiti or the Goias white-lipped frog is a species of frog in the family Leptodactylidae. It is endemic to Minas Goias in Brazil.

== Habitat ==
This terrestrial frog lives in cerrado biomes. Scientists have observed it between 1200 and 1800 meters above sea level.

Scientists have seen the frog in one protected area: Área de Proteção Ambiental (APA) Pouso Alto, which contains Parque Nacional da Chapada dos Veadeiros and Reserva Particular Do Patrimônio Natural Reserva Natural Do Tombador.

== Reproduction ==
This frog breeds in November. The tadpoles have been observed in streams.

== Threats ==
The IUCN classifies this frog as vulnerable to extinction. In some areas, it is under threat from fires. In others, quartz and quarts ore mines pose a threat.
