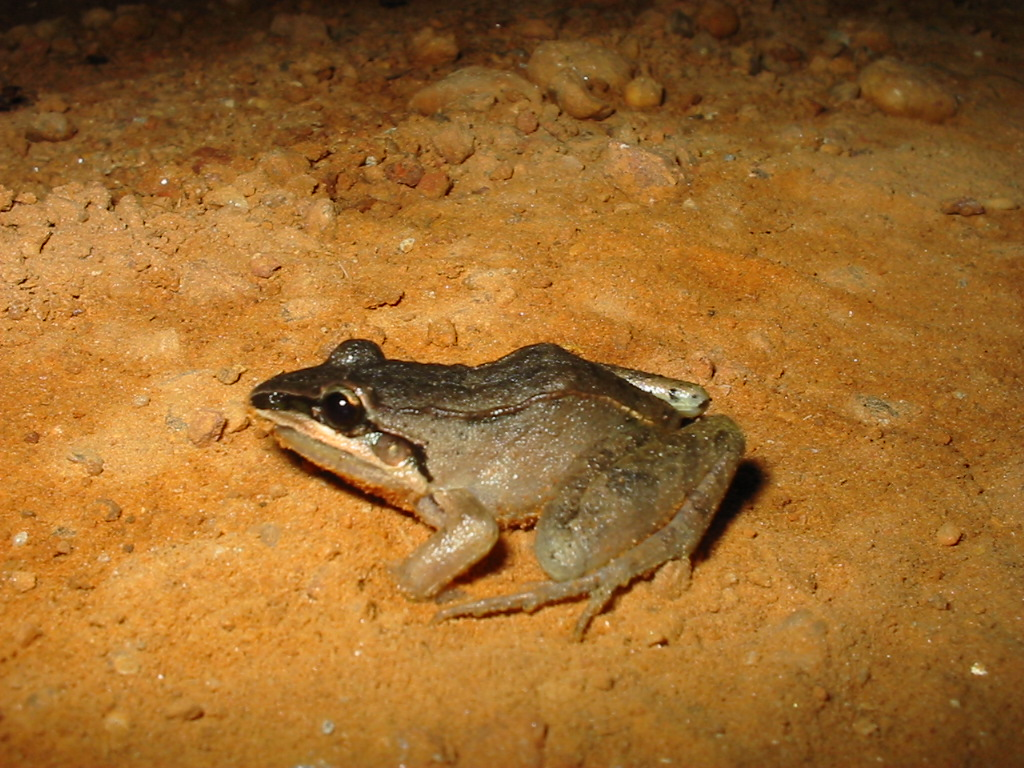

Conservation status
- Least Concern (IUCN 3.1)

Scientific classification
- Kingdom: Animalia
- Phylum: Chordata
- Class: Amphibia
- Order: Anura
- Family: Leptodactylidae
- Genus: Leptodactylus
- Species: L. spixi

Binomial name
- Leptodactylus spixi Heyer, 1983

= Leptodactylus spixi =

Species of frog

Leptodactylus spixi is a species of frog in the family Leptodactylidae. It is endemic to eastern Brazil and occurs in the Atlantic forests of the Bahia, Espírito Santo, and Rio de Janeiro states. The specific name spixi honors Johann Baptist von Spix, a German naturalist who worked in Brazil. Prior to its description, this species had been referred to as Leptodactylus mystaceus (Spix, 1824). The common name Spix's white-lipped frog has been coined for this species.

== Description ==
Adult males measure 39–47 mm (1.5–1.9 in) and adult females 39–49 mm (1.5–1.9 in) in snout–vent length; sexual size dimorphism is not significant in this species. The snout is subelliptical from above and rounded with protruding ridge in lateral profile. The tympanum is large and distinct, as is the supratympanic fold. The dorsum is smooth but has a pair of well-developed dorsolateral folds from behind eye to hind leg. The dorsum has irregular darker brown markings on lighter brown background. The markings include an irregular interorbital backward-pointing triangle and chevrons in the suprascapular region. The dorsolateral folds are barely highlighted by darker brown color. A dark canthal stripe runs from the nostril to the tympanum, interrupted by eye. A distinct light stripe runs from the tip of the snout, below the dark canthal stripe, under eye and tympanum to angle of jaw. The upper lip has slightly darker shading below the light stripe The limbs are barred above. The venter is immaculate. Some individuals lack markings, while a light mid-dorsal stripe is seldom present. Males have a slight external lateral vocal fold but no well-developed vocal sac.

== Habitat and conservation ==
Leptodactylus spixi occurs in the Atlantic Forest. When last assessed by IUCN, this species was considered very common and of least concern.
