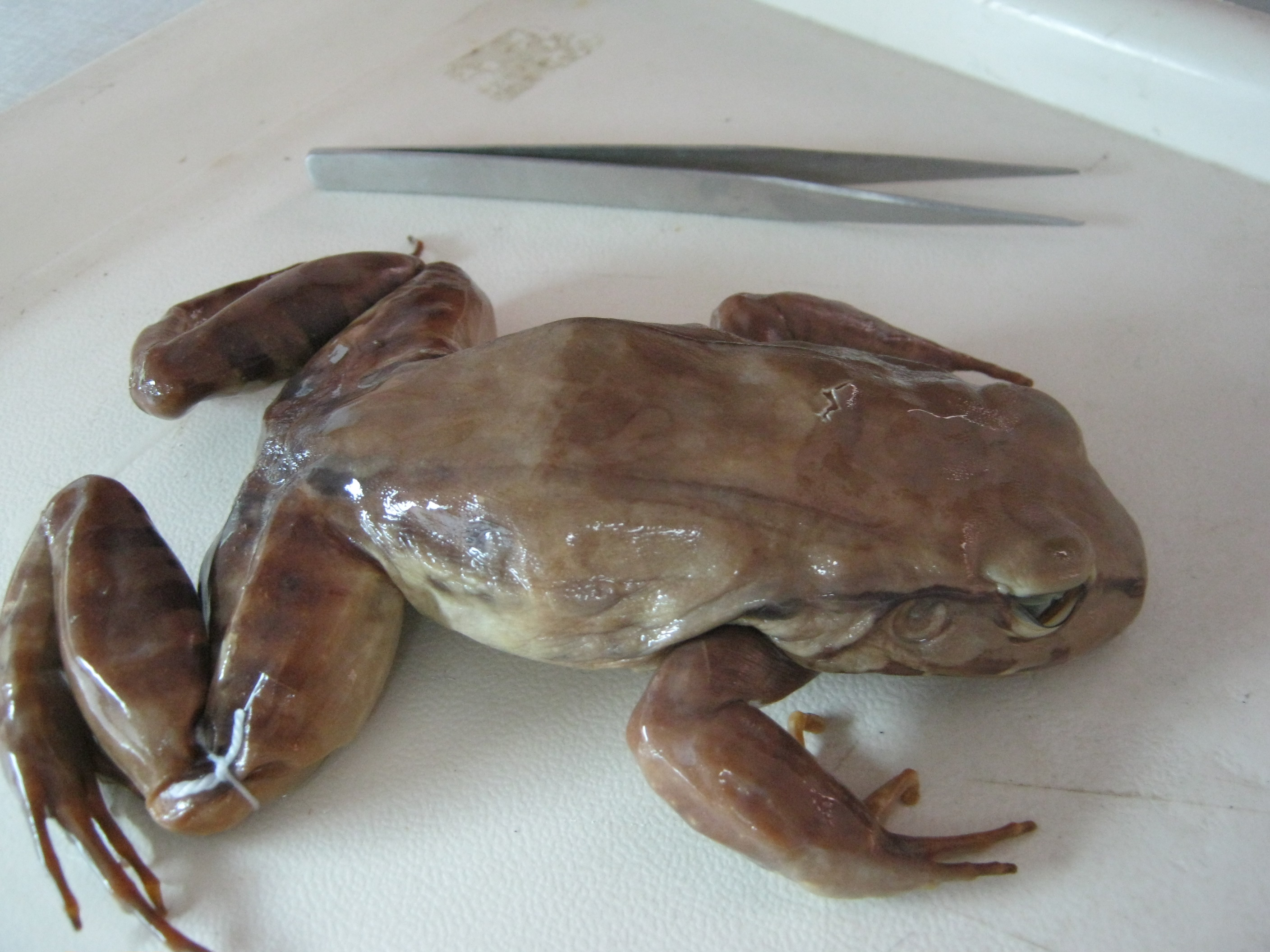

Conservation status
- Least Concern (IUCN 3.1)

Scientific classification
- Kingdom: Animalia
- Phylum: Chordata
- Class: Amphibia
- Order: Anura
- Family: Leptodactylidae
- Genus: Leptodactylus
- Species: L. rhodomerus

Binomial name
- Leptodactylus rhodomerus Heyer, 2005

= Leptodactylus rhodomerus =

Species of frog

Leptodactylus rhodomerus, the rose thigh thin-toed frog, red-thighed thin-toed frog, rana terrestre de muslos rojos, or rana dedilarga muslos roseados, is a species of frog in the family Leptodactylidae. It is endemic to Ecuador and Colombia.

== Description ==
The adult male frog is 112.2–143.8 mm long from nose to rear end and the adult female frog is about 133.5–157.8 mm long. This frog has a large body. There are three dark marks on the upper mouth that make a triangle. The skin of the frog's back is brown with a makr between the eyes.

== Habitat ==
This nocturnal frog lives in rainforests and in Chaco biomes. Sometimes people see it in places that human beings have changed, such as pastureland. Scientists saw the frog between 0 and 1100 meters above sea level.

Scientists have observed the frog inside some protected places: Reserva Ecológica Cotacachi-Cayapas, Reserva Ecológica Mache Chindul, Reserva Tesoro Escondido, Estación Biológica Bilsa, Reserva Río Canandé, Reserva Awa, and Parque Nacional Los Katíos. Scientists believe it could live in many more.

== Relationship to humans ==
Human beings sometimes catch this frog to eat.

== Reproduction ==
Scientists say this frog reproduces by larval development in streams in forests.

== Threats ==
The IUCN classifies this species as least concern of extinction. Principal threats include deforestation in favor of logging and agriculture. Water pollution in rivers also threatens this frog.

== Original description ==
- Heyer WR (2005). "Variation and taxonomic clarification of the large species of the Leptodactylus pentadactylus species group (Amphibia: Leptodactylidae) from Middle America, Northern South America, and Amazonia". Arquivos de Zoologia (Full text). 37: 269–348. doi:10.11606/issn.2176-7793.v37i3p269-348.
