= Leptodactylus luctator =

Conservation status
- Least Concern (IUCN 3.1)

Scientific classification
- Kingdom: Animalia
- Phylum: Chordata
- Class: Amphibia
- Order: Anura
- Family: Leptodactylidae
- Genus: Leptodactylus
- Species: L. luctator

Binomial name
- Leptodactylus luctator (Hudson, 1892)

Synonyms
- Rana luctator Hudson, 1892; Cystignathus oxycephalus Philippi, 1902; Cystignathus oxicephalus Philippi, 1902; Leptodactylus ocellatus var. reticulata Cei, 1948; Leptodactylus ocellatus var. bonairensis Cei, 1949

Species of frog

Leptodactylus luctator, the wrestler frog, is a species of frog in the family Leptodactylidae. It is native to Brazil, Bolivia, Uruguay, and Argentina.

== Habitat ==
These frogs can survive in many types of habitats. They have been observed in savannahs, other grasslands, dry places, forests, edges of forests, ponds, lakes, and next to rivers. It is tolerant to some anthropogenic change, and people have seen it in gardens. Scientists observed the frog between 0 and 1000 meters above sea level.

Scientists have reported the frog in many protected places.

== Relationship to humans ==
This frog is used for human food.

== Reproduction ==
The frog makes a nest out of bubbles for its eggs. The foam nest stays on the top of the water. After the tadpoles hatch, they exhibit schooling behavior.

== Threats ==
The IUCN classifies this frog as least concern of extinction. In some parts of its range, some frogs might be in danger from habitat loss in from logging, fires, or agriculture.
