= Leptodactylus payaya =

Conservation status
- Least Concern (IUCN 3.1)

Scientific classification
- Kingdom: Animalia
- Phylum: Chordata
- Class: Amphibia
- Order: Anura
- Family: Leptodactylidae
- Genus: Leptodactylus
- Species: L. payaya

Binomial name
- Leptodactylus payaya Magalhães, Lyra, Carvalho, Baldo, Brusquetti, Burella, Colli, Gehara, Giaretta, Haddad, Langone, López, Napoli, Santana, de Sá, and Garda, 2020

Species of frog

Leptodactylus payaya is a species of frog in the family Leptodactylidae. It is endemic to Brazil.

== Description ==
The adult male frog measures 58.5-96.9 mm in snout-vent length and the adult female frog 72.6 to 93.6 mm.

== Habitat ==
Scientists have observed the frog in and near the Chapada Diamantina mountains, 467 meters above sea level. They found it in grassy biomes.

Scientists have reported this frog inside protected parks, including Parque Nacional Chapada da Diamantina.

== Reproduction ==
The frog reproduces in temporary bodies of water. The female frog deposits her eggs in a foam nest.

== Threats ==
The IUCN classifies this species as least concern of extinction.
