= Leptodactylus fremitus =

Scientific classification
- Kingdom: Animalia
- Phylum: Chordata
- Class: Amphibia
- Order: Anura
- Family: Leptodactylidae
- Genus: Leptodactylus
- Species: L. fremitus

Binomial name
- Leptodactylus fremitus Carvalho, Fouquet, Lyra, Giaretta, Costa-Campos, Rodrigues, Haddad, and Ron, 2022

Species of frog

Leptodactylus fremitus is a species of frog in the family Leptodactylidae. It is endemic to Brazil, French Guiana, and Suriname. Scientists think it could also live in Guyana.

== Original description ==
- Carvalho TR; Fouquet A; Lyra ML; Giaretta AA; Costa-Campos CE; Rodrigues MT; Haddad CFB; Ron SR (2022). "Species diversity and systematics of the Leptodactylus melanonotusgroup (Anura, Leptodactylidae): review of diagnostic traits and a new species from the Eastern Guiana Shield". Systematics and Biodiversity (Abstract). 20: 1–31. doi:10.1080/14772000.2022.2089269.
