= Leptodactylus diedrus =

Conservation status
- Least Concern (IUCN 3.1)

Scientific classification
- Kingdom: Animalia
- Phylum: Chordata
- Class: Amphibia
- Order: Anura
- Family: Leptodactylidae
- Genus: Leptodactylus
- Species: L. diedrus

Binomial name
- Leptodactylus diedrus Heyer, 1994

Species of frog

Leptodactylus diedrus is a species of frog in the family Leptodactylidae. Its local name is sapito confuso ("confused toadlet"). It is found in northwestern Amazon Basin in Brazil, Colombia, Venezuela, and Peru.

== Description ==
Male Leptodactylus diedrus grow to a snout–vent length of 30–40 mm (1.2–1.6 in) and females to 34–48 mm (1.3–1.9 in).

== Habitat ==
This frog is found in rocky habitats inside forests. Scientists have observed the frog between 0 and 400 meters above sea level. It has been reported in several protected places.

== Reproduction ==
The female frog deposites eggs in a foam nest in lentic water.

== Threats ==
The IUCN classifies this species as least concern of extinction. In some parts of its range, it faces habitat loss to in favor of agriculture and livestock grazing.
