= Leptodactylus ventrimaculatus =

Conservation status
- Least Concern (IUCN 3.1)

Scientific classification
- Kingdom: Animalia
- Phylum: Chordata
- Class: Amphibia
- Order: Anura
- Family: Leptodactylidae
- Genus: Leptodactylus
- Species: L. ventrimaculatus

Binomial name
- Leptodactylus ventrimaculatus Boulenger, 1902

Species of amphibian

Leptodactylus ventrimaculatus is a species of frogs in the family Leptodactylidae. It is found in Colombia and Ecuador.

== Body ==
The adult male frog measures 47.9–55.4 mm in snout-vent length and the adult female frog 44.8–59.3 mm. The skin of the dorsum is cream-yellow with dark brown marks. The flanks can be dark brown, red-brown, or light rbown. There are some marks over the eyes.

== Habitat ==
This nocturnal frog lives in forests near streams. It has shown some tolerance to anthropogenic disturbance and has been found in pastures and secondary forest. Scientists have seen the frog as high as 1400 meters above sea level.

== Reproduction ==
The frogs deposit their eggs on low vegetation. The tadpoles swim and develop in water.

== Threats ==
The IUCN classifies this frog as least concern of extinction. It has shown tolerance to deforestation.
