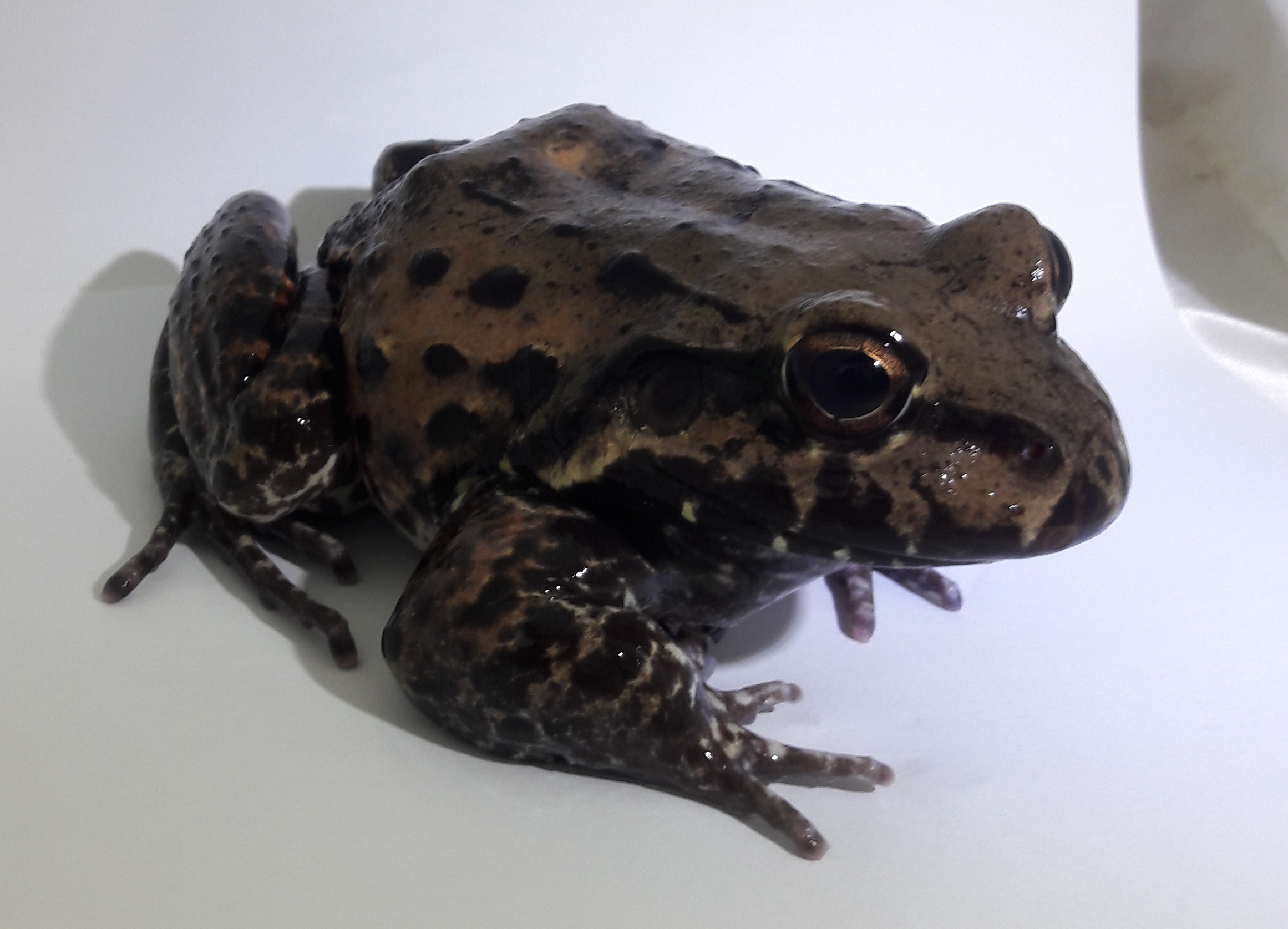

Conservation status
- Least Concern (IUCN 3.1)

Scientific classification
- Kingdom: Animalia
- Phylum: Chordata
- Class: Amphibia
- Order: Anura
- Family: Leptodactylidae
- Genus: Leptodactylus
- Species: L. vastus

Binomial name
- Leptodactylus vastus Lutz, 1930

Synonyms
- Leptodactylus (Cavicola) vastus Lutz, 1930

= Leptodactylus vastus =

Species of frog

Leptodactylus vastus, the northeastern pepper frog, is a species of frog in the family Leptodactylidae. It is endemic to Brazil.

== Habitat ==
The adult frogs have been found in Cerrado and Caatinga biomes and in and near ponds and other bodies of water. Scientists have observed the frog between 153 and 537 meters above sea level.

Scientists have found the frog in protected parks.

== Reproduction ==
This frog builds a foam nest for its eggs on the ground near water. The tadpoles develop in water.

== Threats ==
The IUCN classifies this species as least concern of extinction.

== Original description ==
- Heyer WR (2005). "Variation and taxonomic clarification of the large species of the Leptodactylus pentadactylus species group (Amphibia: Leptodactylidae) from Middle America, Northern South America, and Amazonia". Arquivos de Zoologia. 37: 269–348.
