= Leptodactylus oreomantis =

Conservation status
- Least Concern (IUCN 3.1)

Scientific classification
- Kingdom: Animalia
- Phylum: Chordata
- Class: Amphibia
- Order: Anura
- Family: Leptodactylidae
- Genus: Leptodactylus
- Species: L. oreomantis

Binomial name
- Leptodactylus oreomantis Carvalho, Leite, and Pezzuti, 2013

Species of frog

Leptodactylus oreomantis is a species of frog in the family Leptodactylidae. It is endemic to Brazil.

== Habitat ==
Scientists saw the frog in Caatinga biomes and in rocky areas. Scientists have observed the frog between 950 and 1575 meters above sea level.

This frog has been reported inside protected areas, including PARMU da Serra das Almas and PARNA da Chapada da Diamantina.

== Reproduction ==
The male frog sits near shallow water and calls to the female frogs. People have seen the tadpoles in narrow streams with sandy bottoms and in puddles.

== Threats ==
The IUCN classifies this frog as least concern of extinction. In some places, human beings alter its habitat with fire and to create farms and pastureland.
