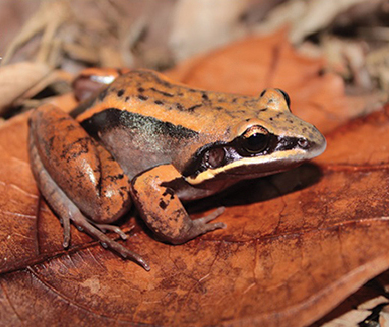

Conservation status
- Least Concern (IUCN 3.1)

Scientific classification
- Kingdom: Animalia
- Phylum: Chordata
- Class: Amphibia
- Order: Anura
- Family: Leptodactylidae
- Genus: Leptodactylus
- Species: L. cupreus

Binomial name
- Leptodactylus cupreus Caramaschi, Feio, and São Pedro, 2008

= Leptodactylus cupreus =

Species of frog

Leptodactylus cupreus is a species of frog in the family Leptodactylidae. It is endemic to Venezuela.

== Habitat ==
This frog lives in forests with large numbers of epiphytes. It has been observed between 0 and 1700 meters above sea level.

The frog has been reported in protected places, specifically PARES da Serra do Brigadeiro, PARMU do Monte Mochuara, and RPPN Estacao Veracel.

== Reproduction ==
The male frog sits under a plant and calls to the female frogs. The female frog builds a foam nest in burrow underground. After the eggs hatch, rainfall washes the tadpoles into nearby pools.

== Threats ==
The IUCN classifies this species as least concern. In some areas, it is in some danger from habitat loss associated with agriculture, silviculture, and livestock grazing.

== Original description ==
- Caramaschi U; Feio RN; Sao-Pedro VA (2008). "A new species of Leptodactylus Fitzinger (Anura, Leptodactylidae) from Serra do Brigadeiro, State of Minas Gerais, southeastern Brazil". Zootaxa (Abstract). 1861: 44–54. doi:10.11646/zootaxa.1861.1.4.
