= Leptodactylus viridis =

Conservation status
- Least Concern (IUCN 3.1)

Scientific classification
- Kingdom: Animalia
- Phylum: Chordata
- Class: Amphibia
- Order: Anura
- Family: Leptodactylidae
- Genus: Leptodactylus
- Species: L. viridis

Binomial name
- Leptodactylus viridis Jim and Spirandelli Cruz, 1973

Species of frog

Leptodactylus viridis (common name: Jim's white-lipped frog) is a species of frog in the family Leptodactylidae. It is endemic to eastern Brazil where it is found in the Bahia and Minas Gerais states.

== Habitat ==
This frog is found in savanna near Atlantic forest. People see it in the edges of forests, grasslands, and grassy marshland. Scientists have observed the frog between 200 and 450 meters above sea level.

== Reproduction ==
This frog prepares foam nests that float on the water for its eggs in temporary ponds. The tadpoles develop in the water.

== Threats ==
The IUCN classifies this species as least concern of extinction. In some parts of its range, the frog is in a small amount of danger from agriculture and silviculture.
