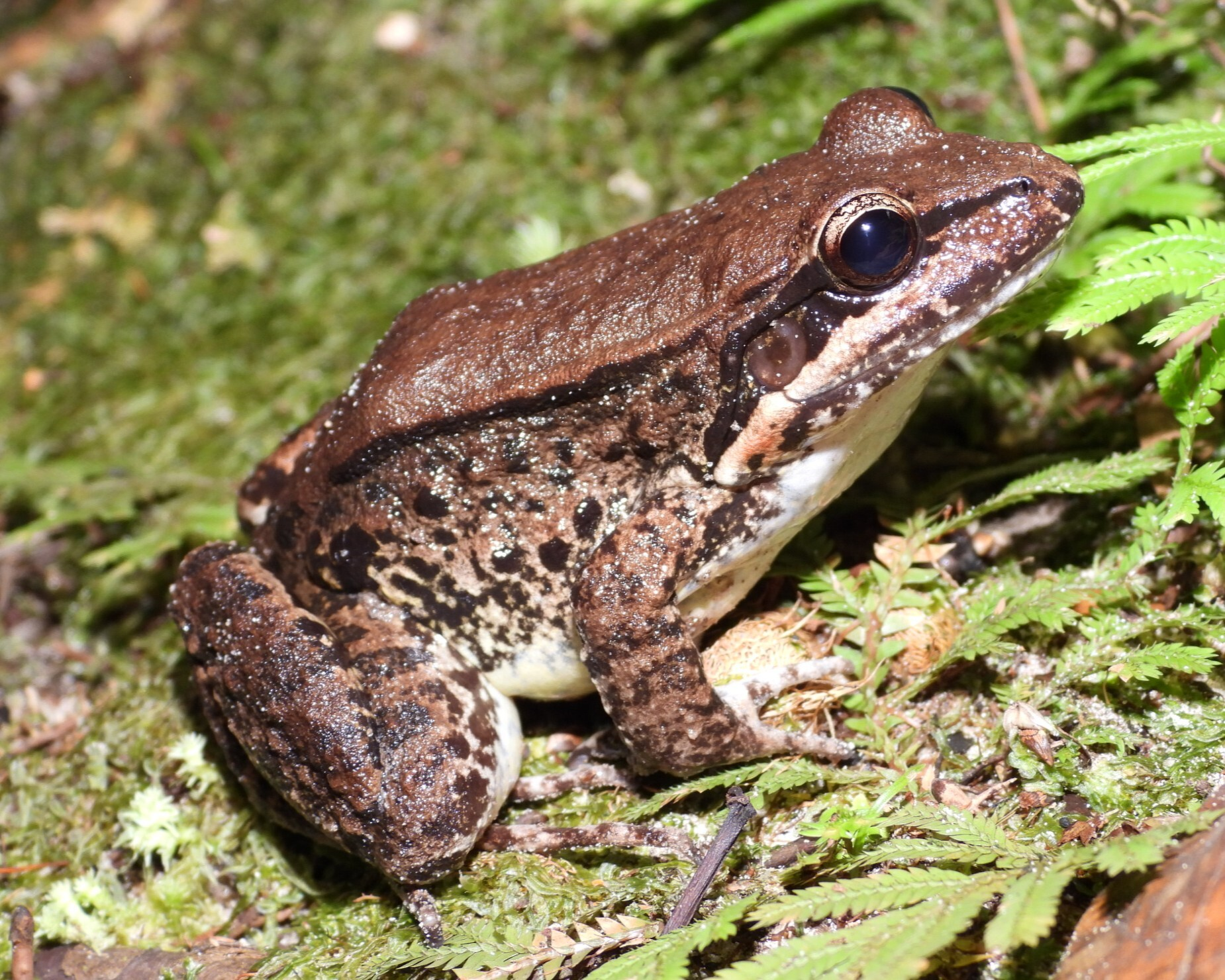

Conservation status
- Least Concern (IUCN 3.1)

Scientific classification
- Kingdom: Animalia
- Phylum: Chordata
- Class: Amphibia
- Order: Anura
- Family: Leptodactylidae
- Genus: Leptodactylus
- Species: L. riveroi

Binomial name
- Leptodactylus riveroi Heyer & Pyburn, 1983

= Leptodactylus riveroi =

Species of frog

Leptodactylus riveroi is a species of frog in the family Leptodactylidae. It is also known as Rivero's white-lipped frog. It is found in Brazil, Colombia, Venezuela, and possibly Peru.

== Habitat ==
This nocturnal, terrestrial frog has been found in forests, next to rivers, and in swamps and gardens. Scientists have observed it between 90 and 450 meters above sea level.

Scientists have seen the frog in protected places.

== Reproduction ==
This frog makes a foam nest for its eggs.

== Threats ==
The IUCN classifies this frog as least concern of dying out. In some parts of their range, they face some threat from mining and from the resulting water pollution.
