= Leptodactylus kilombo =

Conservation status
- Least Concern (IUCN 3.1)

Scientific classification
- Kingdom: Animalia
- Phylum: Chordata
- Class: Amphibia
- Order: Anura
- Family: Leptodactylidae
- Genus: Leptodactylus
- Species: L. kilombo

Binomial name
- Leptodactylus kilombo Alves da Silva, Magalhães, Thomassen, Leite, Garda, Brandão, Haddad, Giaretta, and Carvalho, 2020

Species of frog

Leptodactylus kilombo is a species of frog in the family Leptodactylidae. It is endemic to Brazil.

== Habitat ==
Scientists have observed the frog in Brazil's Caatinga and Cerrado biomes, 600 feet above sea level. They have also seen it in altered habitats, such as pastureland. While it has not been reported in any protected areas, its range overlaps several.

== Reproduction ==
The male frog sits near dry streambeds and calls to the female frogs from leaf litter. This frog builds a foam nest for its eggs. The tadpoles develop in water.

== Threats ==
Scientists from the IUCN say this frog is not in danger of dying out. In some places, human beings change the places where the frog lives to make towns and farms.

== Original description ==
- Da Silva LA; FM Magalhães; H Thomassen; FSF Leite; AA Garda; RA Brandão; CFB Haddad; AA Giaretta; TR de Carvalho (2020). "Unraveling the species diversity and relationships in the Leptodactylus mystaceus complex (Anura: Leptodactylidae), with the description of three new Brazilian species". Zootaxa. 4779: 151–189. doi:10.11646/zootaxa.4779.2.1. hdl:11449/200443. PMID 33055785.
