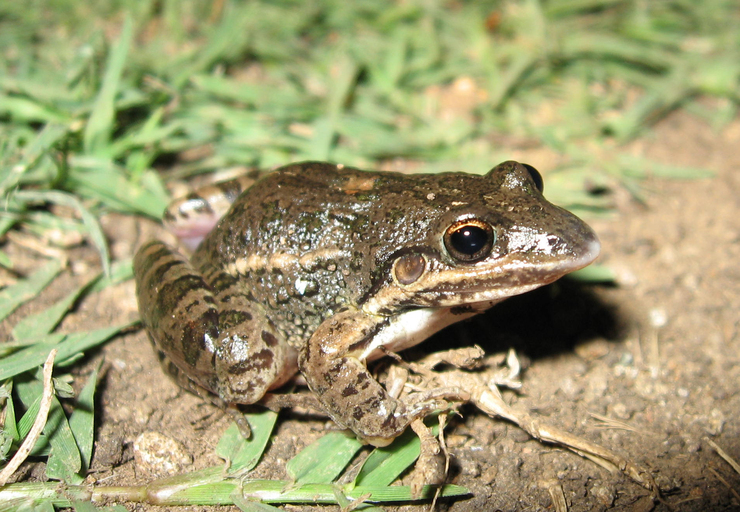

Conservation status
- Data Deficient (IUCN 3.1)

Scientific classification
- Kingdom: Animalia
- Phylum: Chordata
- Class: Amphibia
- Order: Anura
- Family: Leptodactylidae
- Genus: Leptodactylus
- Species: L. lauramiriamae

Binomial name
- Leptodactylus lauramiriamae Heyer, 2005

= Leptodactylus lauramiriamae =

Species of frog

Leptodactylus lauramiriamae is a species of frog in the family Leptodactylidae. It is endemic to Brazil.

== Habitat ==
Scientists observed the frog in a Cerrado biome.

== Reproduction ==
Scientists believe this frog reproduces using one of the same patterns as its congeners: The frog probably makes a foam nest for its eggs in a hole in the ground or on a leaf over some water. After the eggs hatch, the tadpoles fall into the water.

== Threats ==
The IUCN classifies this species as data deficient. Much of the forest near the type locality has been converted to farms and livestock grazing areas, but there are large forested areas nearby, and the frogs may live in them.

== Original description ==
- Heyer WR; Crombie RI (2005). "Leptodactylus lauramiriamae, a distinctive new species of frog (Amphibia: Anura: Leptodactylidae) from Rondonia, Brazil". Proc Biol Soc Wash. 118: 590–595.
