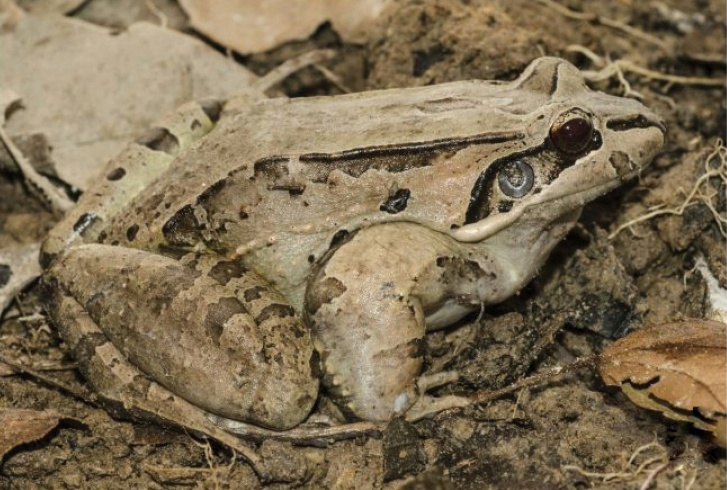

Conservation status
- Least Concern (IUCN 3.1)

Scientific classification
- Kingdom: Animalia
- Phylum: Chordata
- Class: Amphibia
- Order: Anura
- Family: Leptodactylidae
- Genus: Leptodactylus
- Species: L. guianensis

Binomial name
- Leptodactylus guianensis Heyer and de Sá, 2011

= Leptodactylus guianensis =

Species of frog

Leptodactylus guianensis, the Guiana thin-toed frog, is a species of frog in the family Leptodactylidae. It is endemic to Brazil, Colombia, French Guiana, Suriname, Guyana, and Venezuela.

== Description ==
The adult male frog measures 79.5–109.5 mm in snout-vent length and the adult female frog 66.0–109.2 mm. Most individuals have a light-colored stripe on their lips. Many have a dark line under each eye.

== Etymology ==
Scientists named this frog guianaensis for its home on the Guiana Shield.

== Habitat ==
Scientists have observed the frog in primary and secondary forest, near streams, and in some disturbed areas. Scientists believe it has some tolerance to anthropogenic disturbance. Scientists have observed the frog between 0 and 200 meters above sea level.

Scientists have seen this frog inside protected places.

== Reproduction ==
Scientists infer that this frog has young the way other frogs in Leptodactylus do: They deposit their eggs in nests made out of bubbles and the tadpoles develop in water.

== Threats ==
The IUCN classifies this frog as least concern of extinction.
