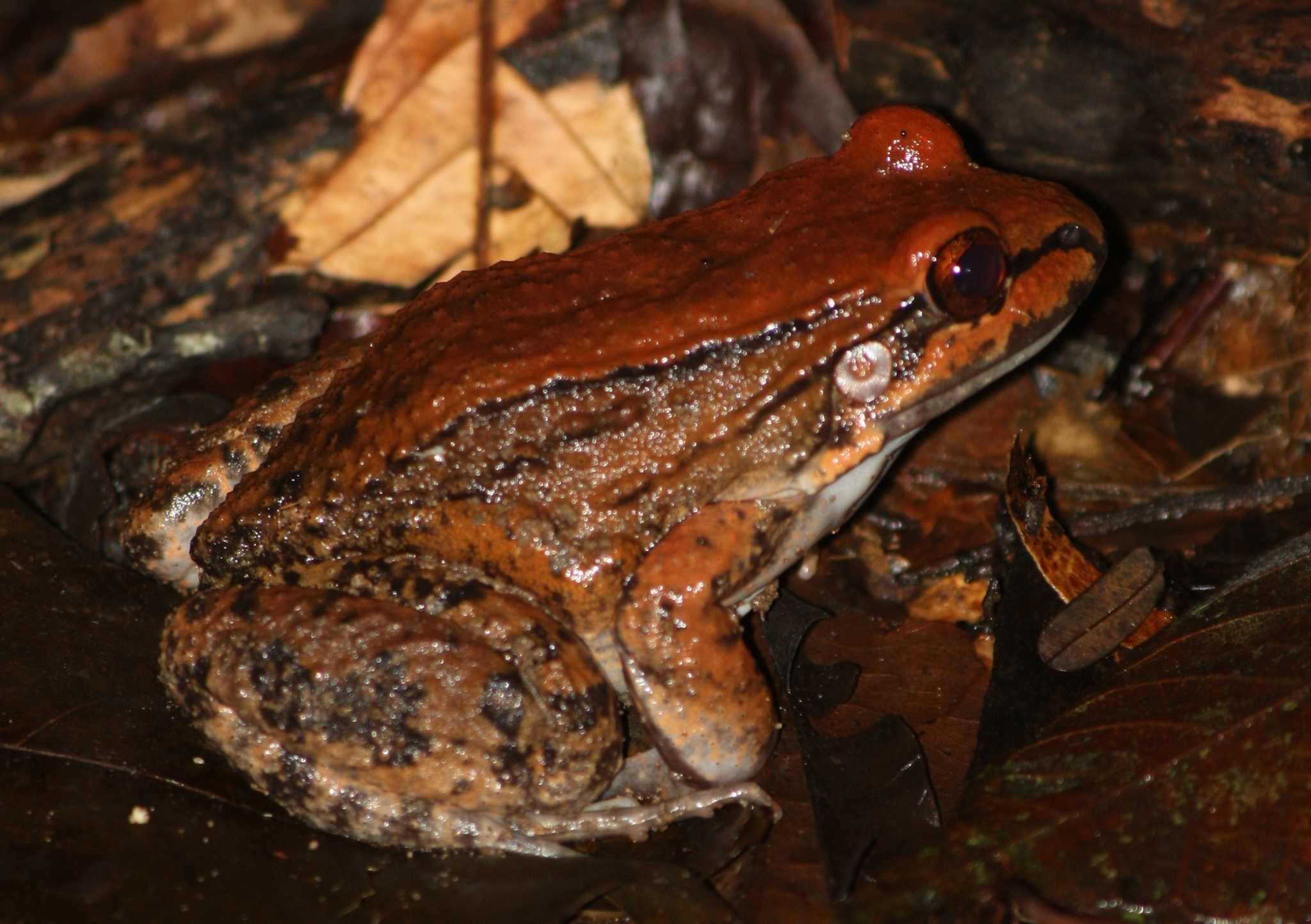
- In Tambopata, Peru

Conservation status
- Least Concern (IUCN 3.1)

Scientific classification
- Kingdom: Animalia
- Phylum: Chordata
- Class: Amphibia
- Order: Anura
- Family: Leptodactylidae
- Genus: Leptodactylus
- Species: L. rhodonotus

Binomial name
- Leptodactylus rhodonotus (Gunther, 1868)

Synonyms
- Cystignathus rhodonotus Günther, 1869 "1868"; Gnathophysa rubido Cope, 1874; Pleurodema (Gnathophysa) rubida Knauer, 1878; Leptodactylus rubido Boulenger, 1882; Leptodactylus rhodonotus Boulenger, 1882; Leptodactylus rubidus Boulenger, 1884 "1883"

= Leptodactylus rhodonotus =

Species of frog

Leptodactylus rhodonotus (Peru white-lipped frog or reddish-brown white-lipped frog) is a species of frog in the family Leptodactylidae. It is found in Bolivia, Brazil, Colombia, and Peru.

== Habitat ==
Its natural habitats are lowland and montane rainforests. People have also seen it in ditches and degraded areas. It has been observed between 200 and 2050 meters above sea level, and in many protected parks.

== Reproduction ==
The female frog makes a nest out of bubbles to put her eggs in. The tadpoles develop in water.

== Threats ==
The IUCN classifies this frog as least concern of extinction.
