= Leptodactylus cunicularius =

Conservation status
- Least Concern (IUCN 3.1)

Scientific classification
- Kingdom: Animalia
- Phylum: Chordata
- Class: Amphibia
- Order: Anura
- Family: Leptodactylidae
- Genus: Leptodactylus
- Species: L. cunicularius

Binomial name
- Leptodactylus cunicularius Sazima & Bokermann, 1978

Species of amphibian

Leptodactylus cunicularius is a species of frogs in the family Leptodactylidae. It is endemic to Brazil.

== Habitat ==
This frog lives in cerrado biomes in the savannah. It occupies sandy microhabitats with rocky outcrops. Scientists have observed the frog between 745 and 1400 meters above sea level. Scientists have reported the frog in some protected places.

== Reproduction ==
The male frog digs a burrow in the sandy ground, sometimes under a rock. The female frog deposits eggs in a foam nest. When the rain falls, the foam nest dissolves and the tadpoles are washed into nearby puddles and streams. Scientists believe that some tadpoles complete their development in the foam nests, but this has yet to be confirmed.

== Threats ==
Scientists from the IUCN say this frog is least concern of extinction. In some places, human beings it lsoes habitat in favor of agriculture and livestock grazing. The animals trample the sandy ground that the frogs need to breed. Because scientists study this frog in undisturbed habitat, they are not certain how well it adapts to human-induced changes.
