= Leptodactylus peritoaktites =

Conservation status
- Endangered (IUCN 3.1)

Scientific classification
- Kingdom: Animalia
- Phylum: Chordata
- Class: Amphibia
- Order: Anura
- Family: Leptodactylidae
- Genus: Leptodactylus
- Species: L. peritoaktites

Binomial name
- Leptodactylus peritoaktites Heyer, 2005

Species of frog

Leptodactylus peritoaktites, the coastal dweller thin-toed frog, coastal Ecuador smoky jungle frog, or rana dedilarga de la costa, is a species of frog in the family Leptodactylidae. It is endemic to Ecuador.

== Description ==
The adult male frog measures 124 to 146.3 mm (4.88 to 5.76 in) in snout-vent length and the adult female frog 115.3–133.1 mm (4.54–5.24 in). This frog has a large, robust body. The skin of the dorsum is brown with two bands. The upper lip has dark marks on it, some reaching each eye. The tympanum and flanks are dark brown. The forelegs have dark stripes across them. The ventral area is brown with cream-white spots.

== Etymology ==
Scientists named the frog peritoaktites from the Greek peritos for "west" and aktites for "coastal dweller."

== Habitat ==
Scientists observed the frog in rainforests in western Ecuador as high as 600 metres (2,000 ft) above sea level.

Scientists saw the frog inside some protected places: Bosque Protector la Perla, Mache-Chindul Ecological Reserve, and the Reserva Jama-Coaque.

== Relationship to humans ==
Local people sometimes catch this frog to eat.

== Reproduction ==
Scientists believe this frog has young in streams.

== Threats ==
The IUCN classifies this frog as endangered. The principal threats are deforestation in favor of agriculture and unsustainable timber harvesting.
