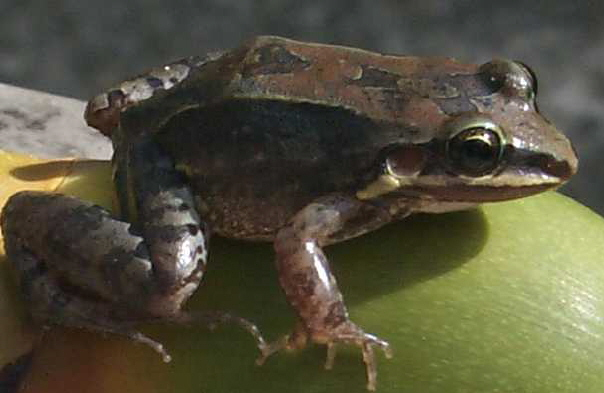
- Leptodactylus albilabris

Scientific classification
- Kingdom: Animalia
- Phylum: Chordata
- Class: Amphibia
- Order: Anura
- Family: Leptodactylidae
- Subfamily: Leptodactylinae
- Genus: Leptodactylus; Fitzinger, 1826

Species
- Many—see text

= Leptodactylus =

Genus of amphibians

Leptodactylus is a genus of leptodactylid frogs. It includes the species commonly called ditch frogs or white-lipped frogs. It is very similar to Physalaemus, a close relative, and indeed the 2005 described Leptodactylus lauramiriamae is in some aspects intermediate between them.

== Etymology ==
The name means 'slender finger', from leptos ('thin, delicate') and the Greek daktylos (δάκτυλος, 'finger, toe').

== Taxonomy ==
The genus Leptodactylus's sister taxon is the genus Hydrolaetare.

The genus is composed of four species groups. However, three species have not been assigned to a species group (L. hylodes, L. lauramiriamae, L. ochraceus).

Species Group	Species included	Image
Leptodactylus fuscus group	L. apepyta, L. barrioi, L. albilabris, L. bufonius, L. caatingae, L. camaquara, L. cunicularius, L. cupreus, L. didymus, L. elenae, L. fragilis, L. furnarius, L. fuscus, L. gracilis, L. jolyi, L. kilombo, L. labrosus, L. laticeps, L. latinasus, L. longirostris, L. marambaiae, L. mystaceus, L. mystacinus, L. notoaktites, L. oreomantis, L. plaumanni, L. poecilochilus, L. sertanejo, L. spixi, L. syphax, L. tapiti, L. troglodytes, L. ventrimaculatus, L. watu	L. fuscus (whistling grass frog)
Leptodactylus melanonotus group	L. brevipes, L. colombiensis, L. discodactylus, L. diedrus, L. fremitus, L. grisegularis, L. intermedius, L. leptodactyloides, L. magistris, L. melanonotus, L. natalensis, L. nesiotus, L. pascoensis, L. petersii, L. podicipinus, L. pustulatus, L. riveroi, L. sabanensis, L. validus, L. wagneri	L. melanonotus (Sabinal frog)
Leptodactylus latrans group	L. bolivianus, L. guianensis, L. insularum, L. latrans, L. luctator, L. macrosternum, L. paranaru, L. payaya, L. silvanimbus, L. viridis	L. latrans (butter frog)
Leptodactylus pentadactylus group	L. fallax, L. flavopictus, L. knudseni, L. labyrinthicus, L. laticeps, L. lithonaetes, L. myersi, L. paraensis, L. pentadactylus, L. peritoaktites, L. rhodomerus, L. rhodomystax, L. rhodonotus, L. rugosus, L. savagei, L. stenodema, L. turimiquensis, L. vastus	L. pentadactylus (smoky jungle frog)

== Species ==
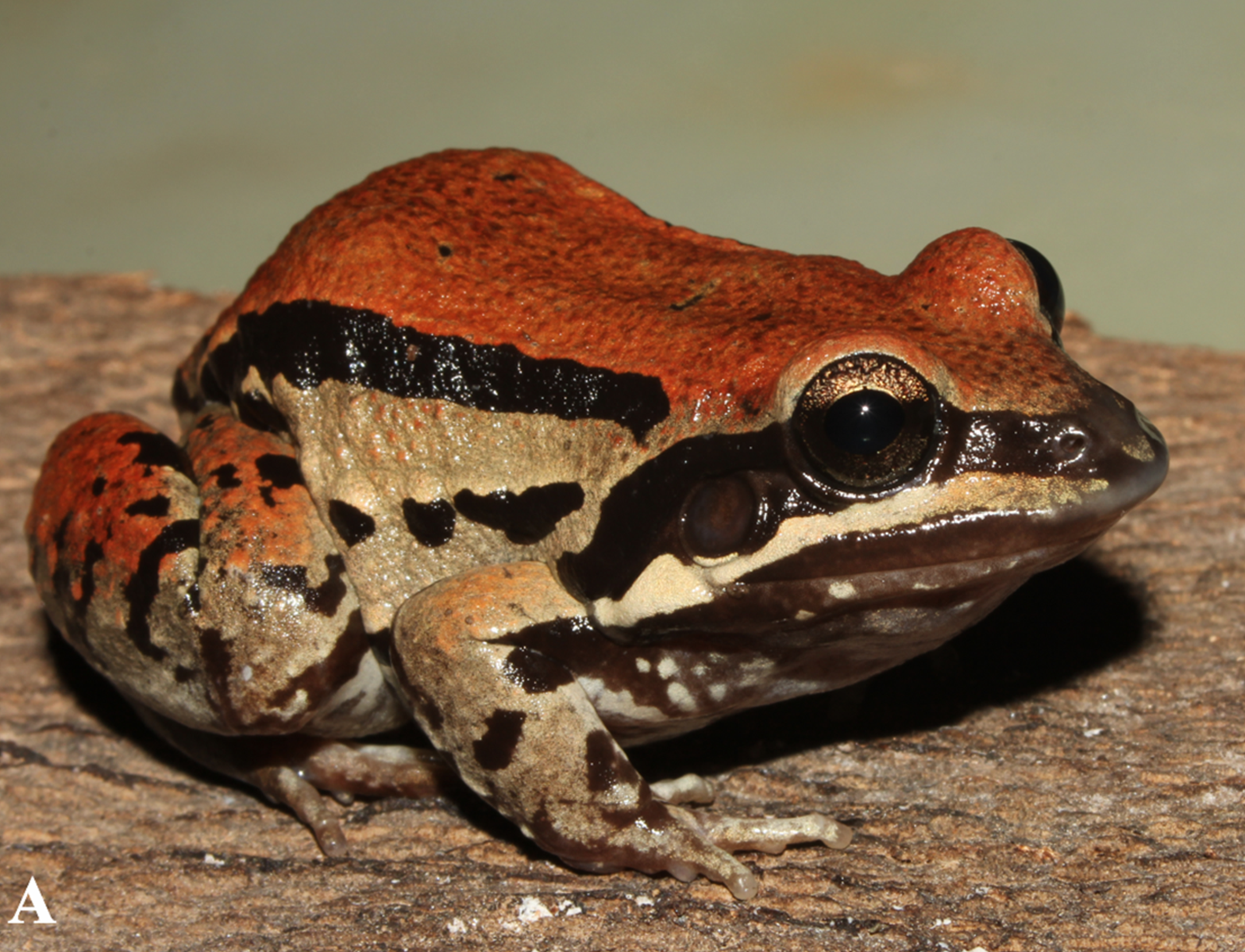
Leptodactylus apepyta

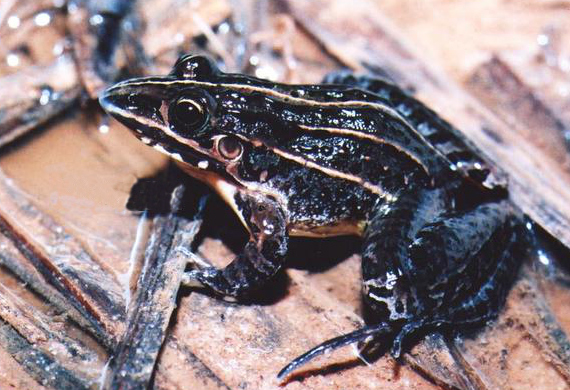
Leptodactylus furnarius

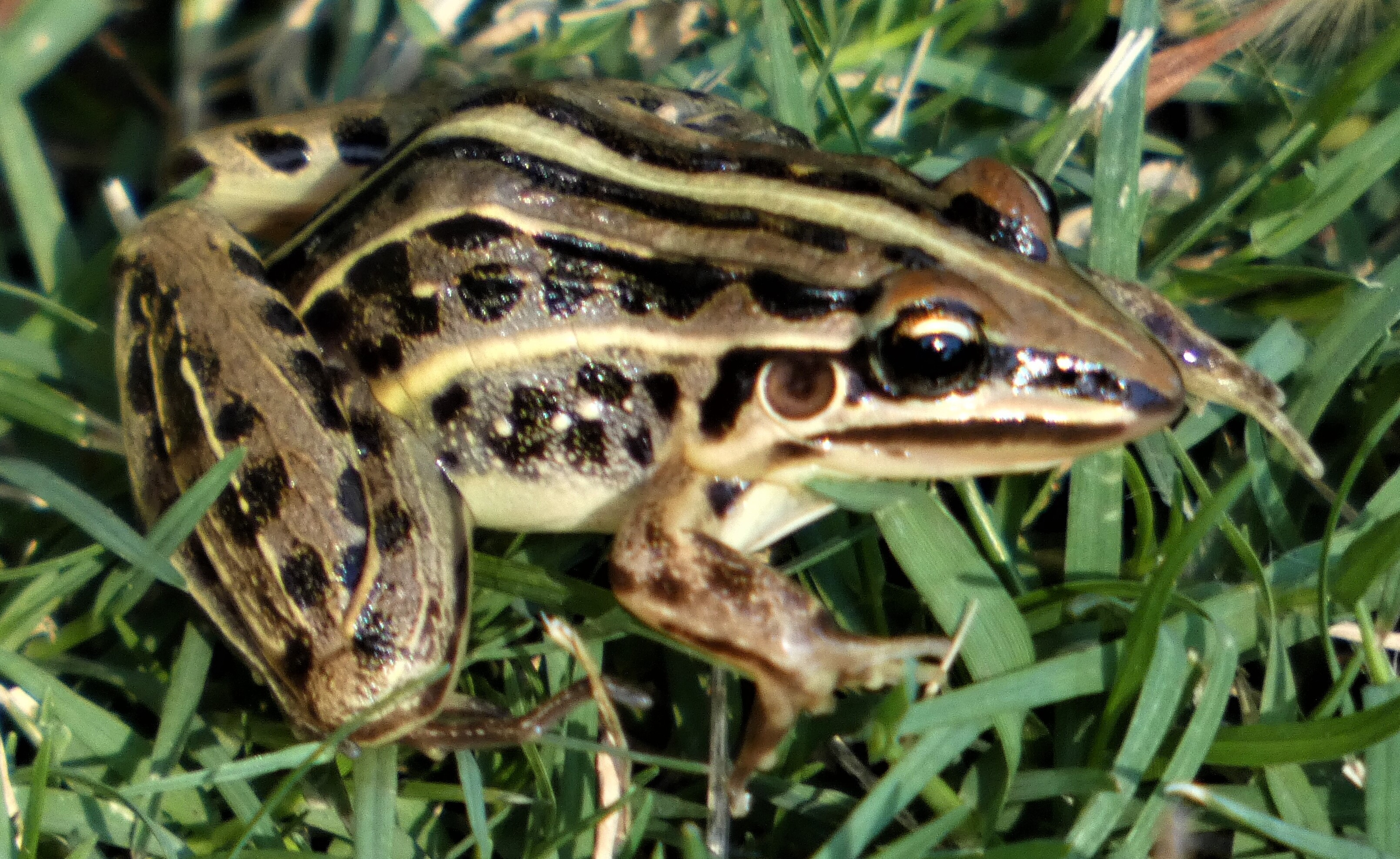
Leptodactylus gracilis

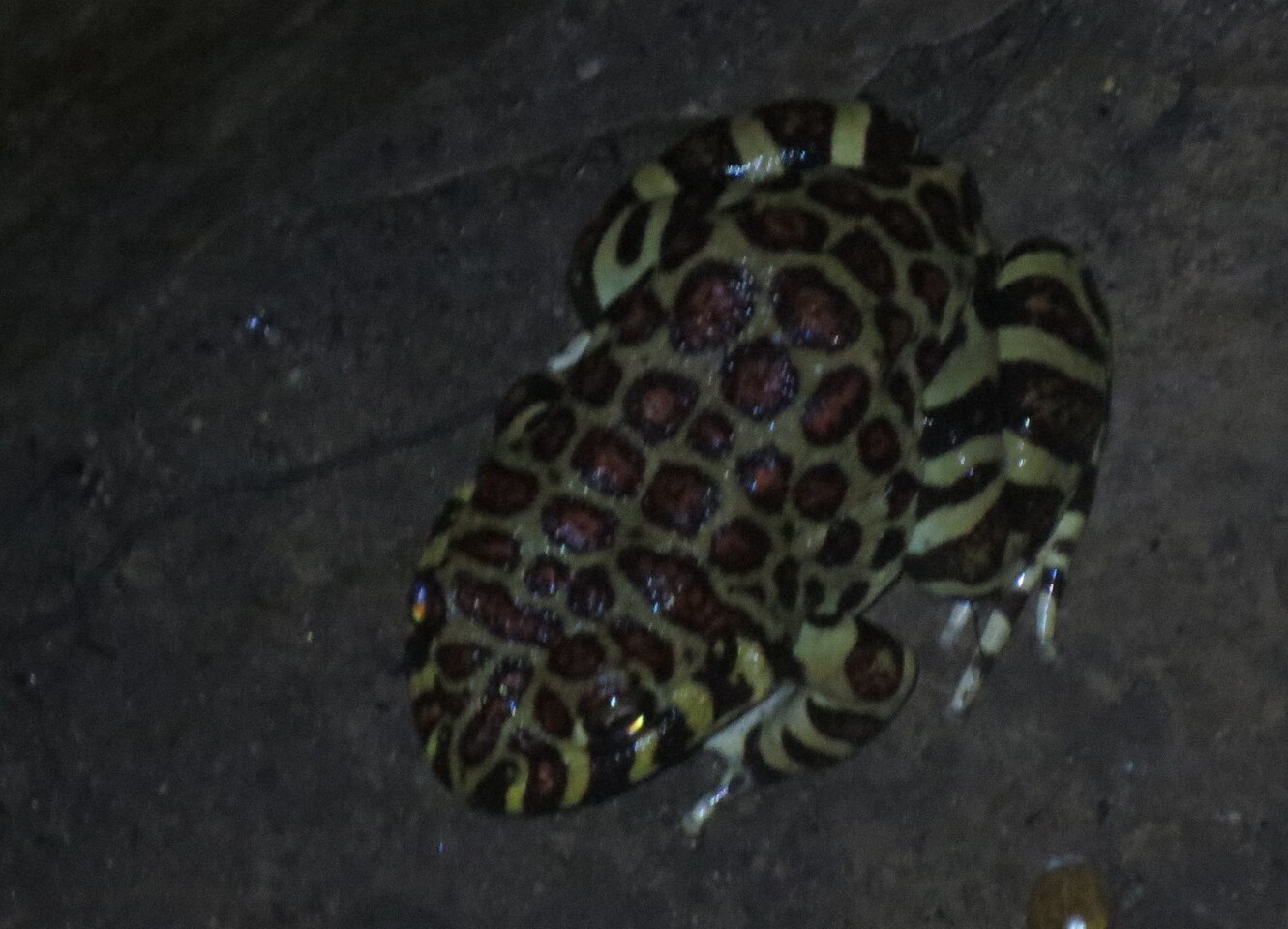
Leptodactylus laticeps

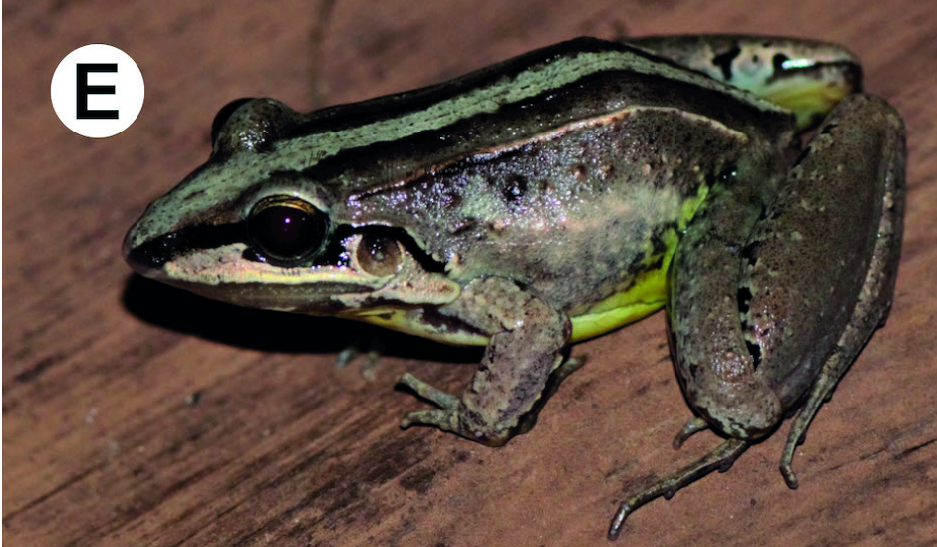
Leptodactylus longirostris

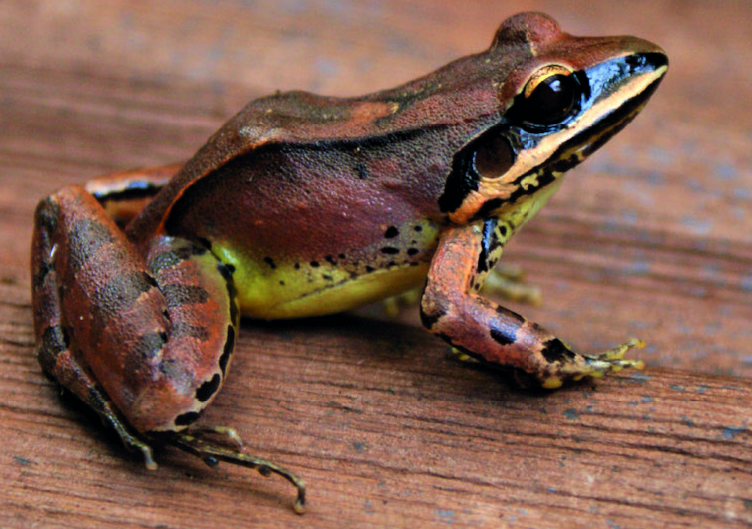
Leptodactylus mystaceus

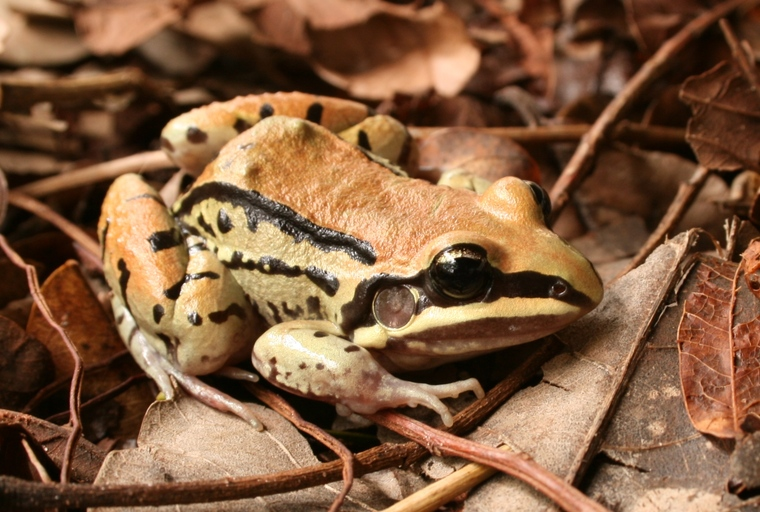
Leptodactylus mystacinus

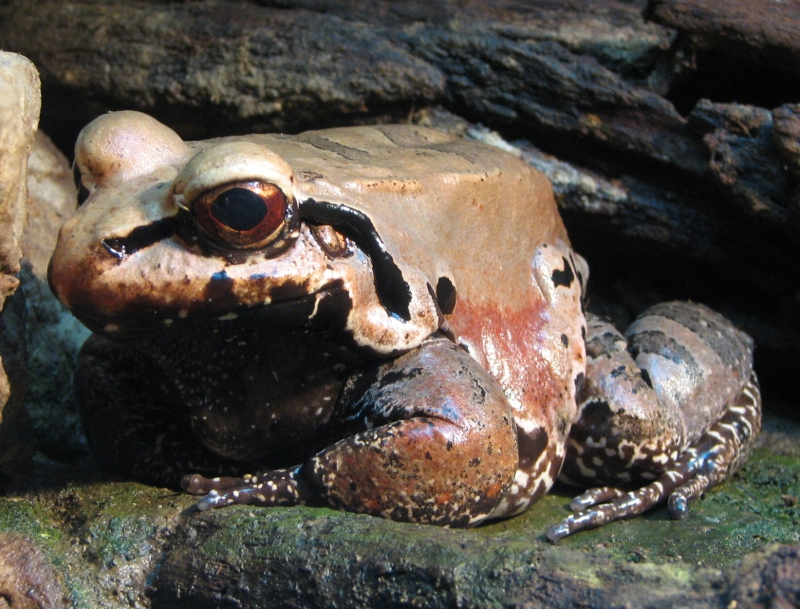
Smoky jungle frog, Leptodactylus pentadactylus

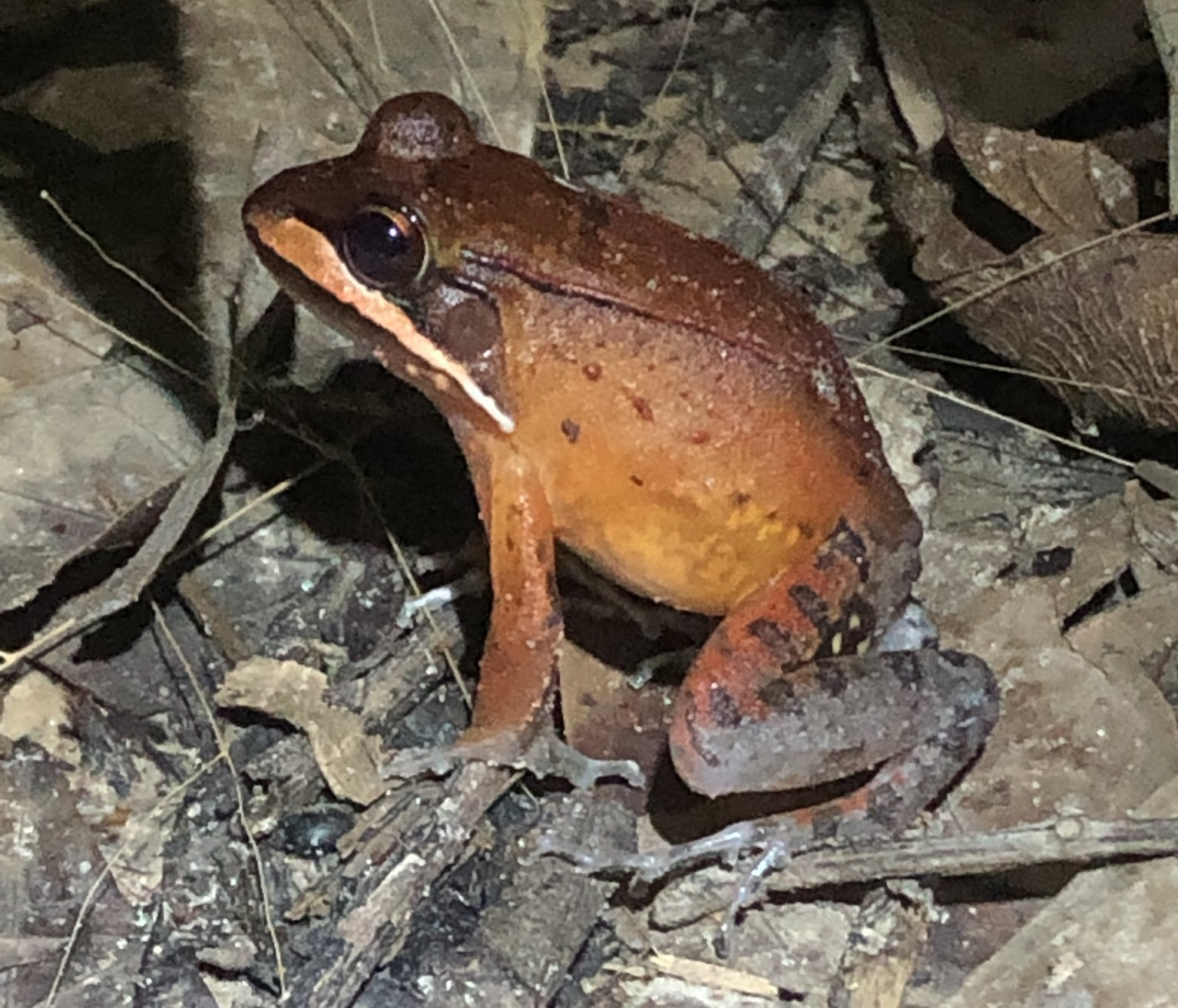
Leptodactylus rhodomystax

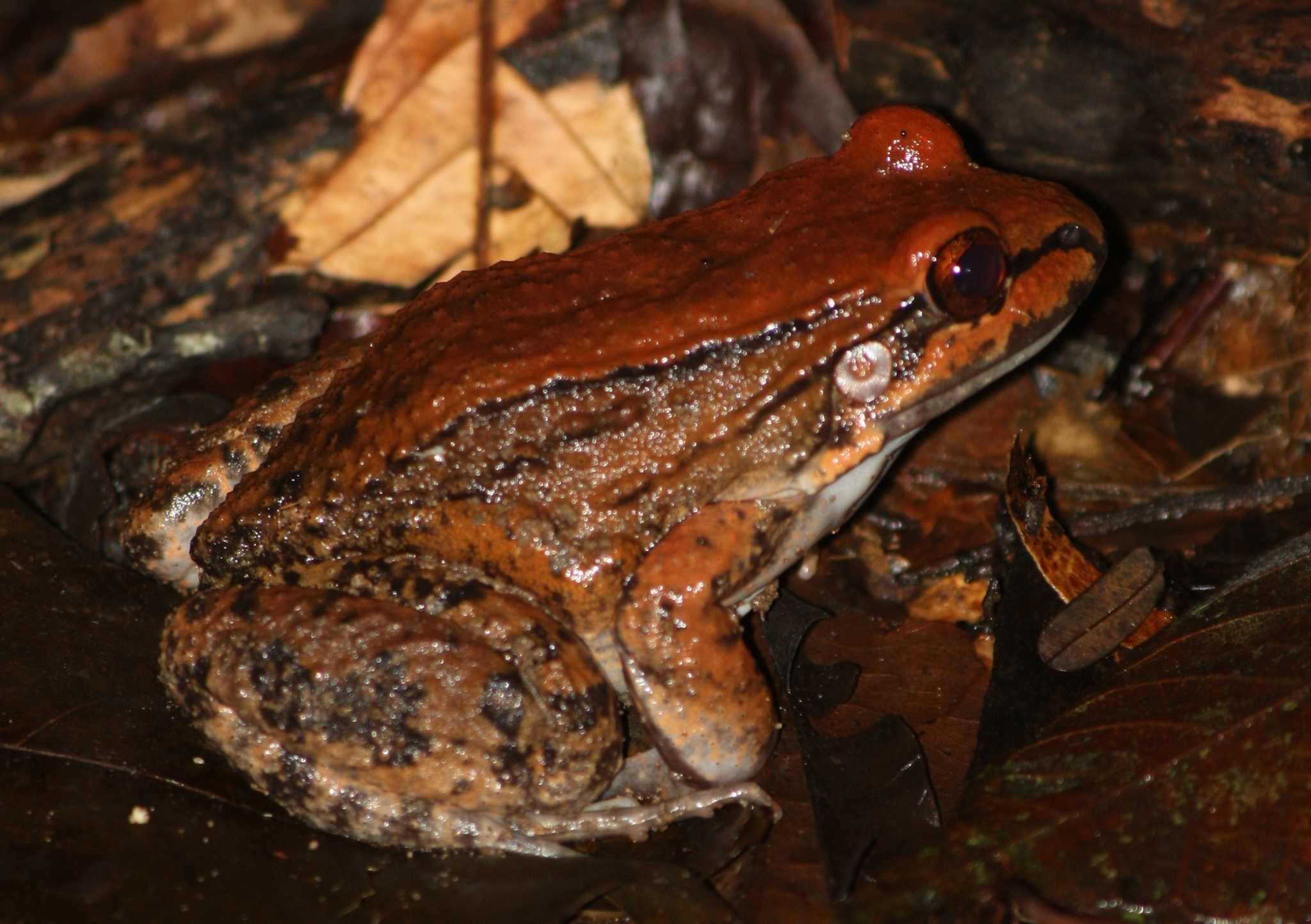
Leptodactylus rhodonotus

There are 84 species in this genus:

- Leptodactylus albilabris (Günther, 1859) – Hispaniolan ditch frog
- Leptodactylus apepyta Schneider, Cardozo, Brusquetti, Kolenc, Borteiro, Haddad, Basso, and Baldo, 2019
- Leptodactylus avivoca Carvalho, Seger, Magalhães, Lourenço, and Haddad, 2021
- Leptodactylus barrioi Alves da Silva, Magalhães, Thomassen, Leite, Garda, Brandão, Haddad, Giaretta, and Carvalho, 2020
- Leptodactylus bolivianus Boulenger, 1898
- Leptodactylus brevipes Cope, 1887
- Leptodactylus bufonius Boulenger, 1894
- Leptodactylus caatingae Heyer and Juncá, 2003
- Leptodactylus camaquara Sazima and Bokermann, 1978
- Leptodactylus colombiensis Heyer, 1994
- Leptodactylus cunicularius Sazima and Bokermann, 1978
- Leptodactylus cupreus Caramaschi, Feio, and São Pedro, 2008
- Leptodactylus didymus Heyer, García-Lopez, and Cardoso, 1996
- Leptodactylus diedrus Heyer, 1994
- Leptodactylus discodactylus Boulenger, 1884
- Leptodactylus elenae Heyer, 1978
- Leptodactylus fallax Müller, 1926 – giant ditch frog, mountain chicken
- Leptodactylus flavopictus Lutz, 1926
- Leptodactylus fragilis (Brocchi, 1877) – Mexican white-lipped frog
- Leptodactylus fremitus Carvalho, Fouquet, Lyra, Giaretta, Costa-Campos, Rodrigues, Haddad, and Ron, 2022
- Leptodactylus furnarius Sazima and Bokermann, 1978
- Leptodactylus fuscus (Schneider, 1799)
- Leptodactylus gracilis (Duméril and Bibron, 1840)
- Leptodactylus griseigularis (Henle, 1981)
- Leptodactylus guianensis Heyer and de Sá, 2011
- Leptodactylus hylodes (Reinhardt and Lütken, 1862)
- Leptodactylus insularum Barbour, 1906
- Leptodactylus intermedius Lutz, 1930
- Leptodactylus jolyi Sazima and Bokermann, 1978
- Leptodactylus kilombo Alves da Silva, Magalhães, Thomassen, Leite, Garda, Brandão, Haddad, Giaretta, and Carvalho, 2020
- Leptodactylus knudseni Heyer, 1972
- Leptodactylus labrosus Jiménez de la Espada, 1875
- Leptodactylus labyrinthicus (Spix, 1824)
- Leptodactylus laticeps Boulenger, 1918
- Leptodactylus latinasus Jiménez de la Espada, 1875 – Urnero
- Leptodactylus latrans (Steffen, 1815)
- Leptodactylus lauramiriamae Heyer and Crombie, 2005
- Leptodactylus leptodactyloides (Andersson, 1945)
- Leptodactylus lithonaetes Heyer, 1995
- Leptodactylus longirostris Boulenger, 1882
- Leptodactylus luctator (Hudson, 1892)
- Leptodactylus macrosternum Miranda-Ribeiro, 1926
- Leptodactylus magistris Mijares-Urrutia, 1997
- Leptodactylus marambaiae Izecksohn, 1976
- Leptodactylus melanonotus (Hallowell, 1861)
- Leptodactylus myersi Heyer, 1995
- Leptodactylus mystaceus (Spix, 1824)
- Leptodactylus mystacinus (Burmeister, 1861)
- Leptodactylus natalensis Lutz, 1930
- Leptodactylus nesiotus Heyer, 1994
- Leptodactylus notoaktites Heyer, 1978
- Leptodactylus oreomantis Carvalho, Leite, and Pezzuti, 2013
- Leptodactylus paraensis Heyer, 2005
- Leptodactylus paranaru Magalhães, Lyra, Carvalho, Baldo, Brusquetti, Burella, Colli, Gehara, Giaretta, Haddad, Langone, López, Napoli, Santana, de Sá, and Garda, 2020
- Leptodactylus pascoensis Heyer, 1994
- Leptodactylus payaya Magalhães, Lyra, Carvalho, Baldo, Brusquetti, Burella, Colli, Gehara, Giaretta, Haddad, Langone, López, Napoli, Santana, de Sá, and Garda, 2020
- Leptodactylus pentadactylus (Laurenti, 1768) – smoky jungle frog
- Leptodactylus peritoaktites Heyer, 2005
- Leptodactylus petersii (Steindachner, 1864)
- Leptodactylus plaumanni Ahl, 1936
- Leptodactylus podicipinus (Cope, 1862)
- Leptodactylus poecilochilus (Cope, 1862)
- Leptodactylus pustulatus (Peters, 1870)
- Leptodactylus rhodomerus Heyer, 2005
- Leptodactylus rhodomystax Boulenger, 1884
- Leptodactylus rhodonotus (Günther, 1869)
- Leptodactylus riveroi Heyer and Pyburn, 1983
- Leptodactylus rugosus Noble, 1923
- Leptodactylus sabanensis Heyer, 1994
- Leptodactylus savagei Heyer, 2005
- Leptodactylus sertanejo Giaretta and Costa, 2007
- Leptodactylus silvanimbus McCranie, Wilson, and Porras, 1980
- Leptodactylus spixi Heyer, 1983
- Leptodactylus stenodema Jiménez de la Espada, 1875
- Leptodactylus syphax Bokermann, 1969
- Leptodactylus tapiti Sazima and Bokermann, 1978
- Leptodactylus troglodytes Lutz, 1926
- Leptodactylus turimiquensis Heyer, 2005
- Leptodactylus validus Garman, 1888 – windward ditch frog
- Leptodactylus vastus Lutz, 1930
- Leptodactylus ventrimaculatus Boulenger, 1902
- Leptodactylus viridis Jim and Spirandeli Cruz, 1973
- Leptodactylus wagneri (Peters, 1862)
- Leptodactylus watu Alves da Silva, Magalhães, Thomassen, Leite, Garda, Brandão, Haddad, Giaretta, and Carvalho, 2020
