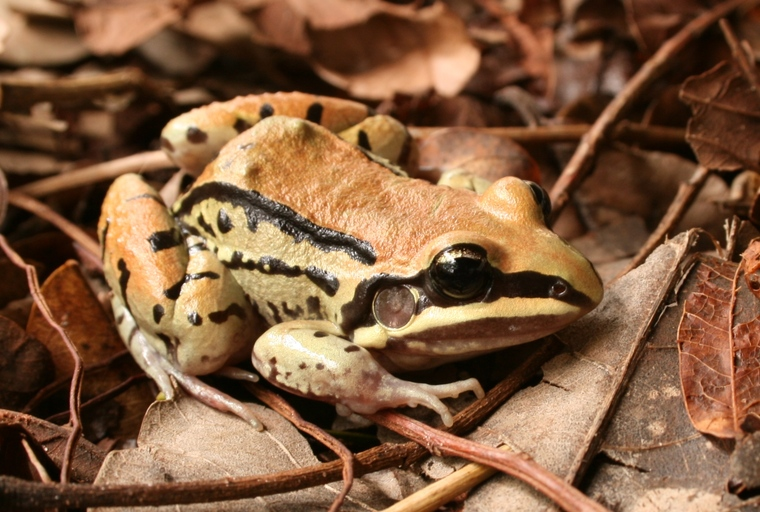

Conservation status
- Least Concern (IUCN 3.1)

Scientific classification
- Kingdom: Animalia
- Phylum: Chordata
- Class: Amphibia
- Order: Anura
- Family: Leptodactylidae
- Genus: Leptodactylus
- Species: L. mystacinus

Binomial name
- Leptodactylus mystacinus (Burmeister, 1861)

Synonyms
- Cystignathus mystacinus Burmeister, 1861; Cystignathus labialis Cope, 1877

= Leptodactylus mystacinus =

Species of frog

Leptodactylus mystacinus is a species of frog in the family Leptodactylidae. It is found in eastern Bolivia and eastwards to Brazil, Paraguay, and Uruguay and southwards to central Argentina. It is also known as the mustached frog.

== Description ==
Adult males measure 44–65 mm (1.7–2.6 in) and adult females 54–67 mm (2.1–2.6 in) in snout–vent length. The snout in males is more spatulate than in females. A pair of dorsolateral folds runs from behind the eye to the upper groin; a second pair is either incomplete or interrupt and starts from the forearm insertion and runs along the flanks. The toes lack fringes and fleshy ridges, the toe tips are narrow. The dorsum is uniform, striped, or bears small dark spots. The upper pair of dorsolateral folds is lined with a distinct dark brown stripe or band below and usually with a light pinstripe above; the latter becomes often broader and more distinct posteriorly. The lower dorsolateral folds along the flanks may have dark or cream highlights, or both. The upper lip typically has a distinct light stripe. The venter ranges from being immaculate to mottled.

== Habitat and conservation ==
Leptodactylus mystacinus is a terrestrial frog found in grasslands near standing bodies of water, its breeding habitat. Reproduction takes place in under-ground foam nests; the tadpoles develop in water. Some populations are found in forests and formerly forested areas. It is found at elevations below 1,800 m (5,900 ft). It is a common species that adapts well to human disturbance. It occurs in several protected areas and is not considered threatened by the International Union for Conservation of Nature (IUCN).
