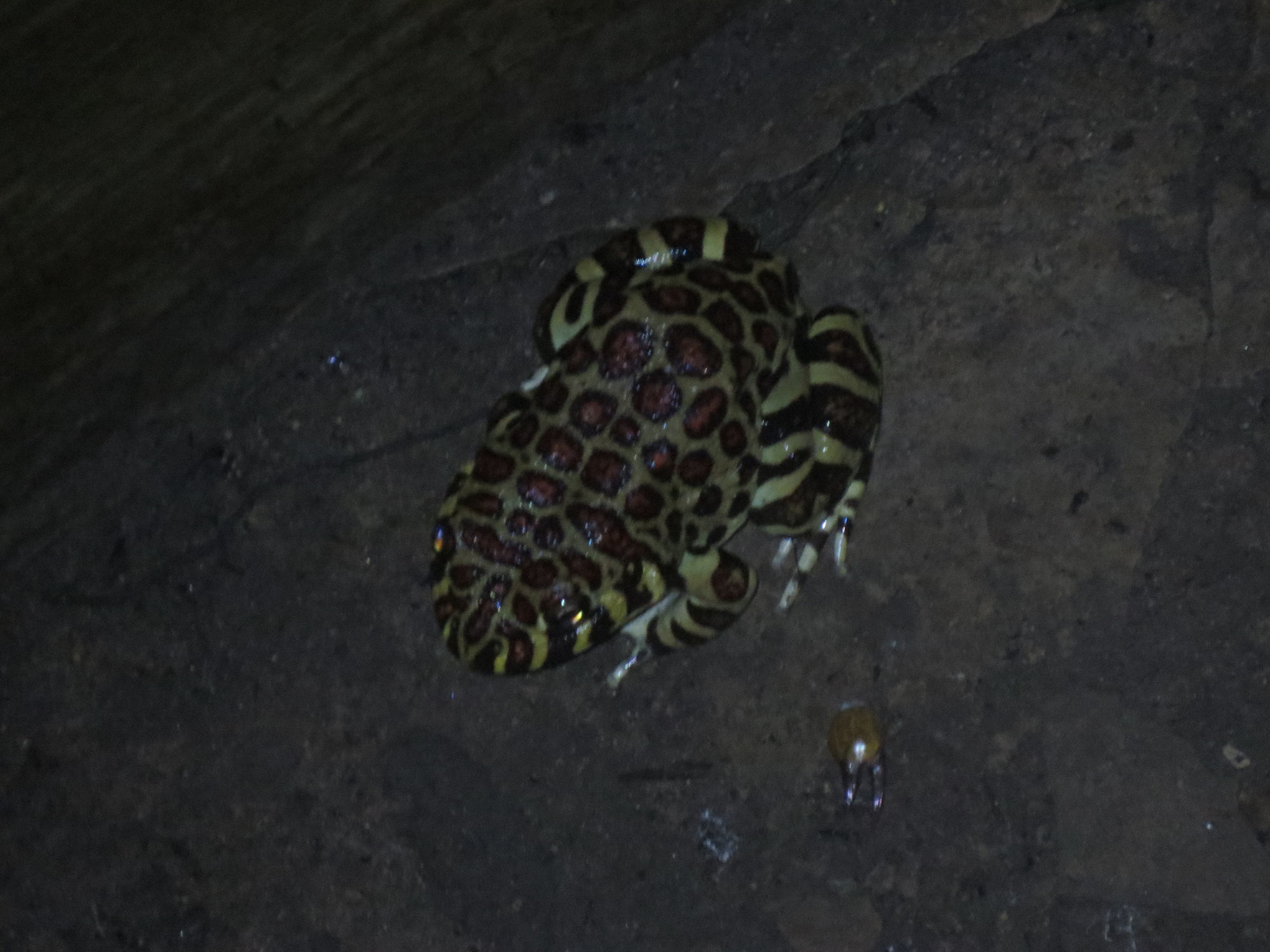
- In Pozo Colorado, Paraguay

Conservation status
- Near Threatened (IUCN 3.1)

Scientific classification
- Kingdom: Animalia
- Phylum: Chordata
- Class: Amphibia
- Order: Anura
- Family: Leptodactylidae
- Genus: Leptodactylus
- Species: L. laticeps

Binomial name
- Leptodactylus laticeps Boulenger, 1918

= Leptodactylus laticeps =

Species of frog

Leptodactylus laticeps, known commonly as the Santa Fe frog is a species of frog in the family Leptodactylidae. It is found the Gran Chaco of South America, in Argentina, Bolivia, and Paraguay.

== Taxonomy ==
The first description of the species was published by George Albert Boulenger in 1918, with the type locality being Santa Fe, Argentina.

== Description and behaviour ==
The frog is known to build caves or use caves built by other animals. Reproduction takes place in ephemeral ponds, and while it is unclear how the tadpoles live, it is believed that their development is at least partially subterranean.

== Distribution and habitat ==
L. laticeps is found in the Gran Cacho of Argentina, Bolivia and Paraguay, mainly inhabiting the drier regions. It is a terrestrial frog closely associated with forest habitats, and is found at elevations of 0–300 m (0–984 ft).

=== Conservation ===
The species is threatened by the international pet trade and by habitat loss, and it is considered unlikely for the species to be resilient to human disturbances of its habitats. In Paraguay the habitat loss is driven by the expansion of cattle grazing, the construction of roads and forest fires becoming more frequent and larger, with about 18.5% of the Paraguayan Dry Chaco being deforested between 2001 and 2012.

The 2020 IUCN Red List assessment of L. laticeps deemed the species to be near threatened due to population decline as a result of too many frogs being collected for the international pet trade, which has made the frog rare in Argentina. It is listed as vulnerable on the National Red List in Argentina and as least concern on the National Red List in Paraguay.
