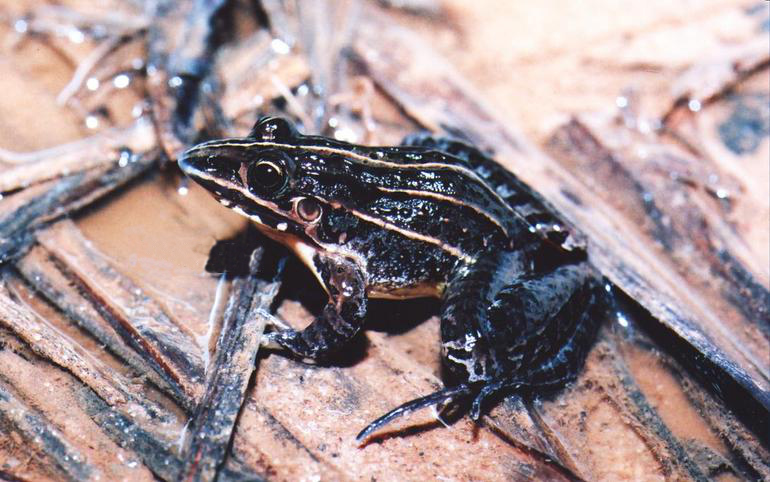

Conservation status
- Least Concern (IUCN 3.1)

Scientific classification
- Kingdom: Animalia
- Phylum: Chordata
- Class: Amphibia
- Order: Anura
- Family: Leptodactylidae
- Genus: Leptodactylus
- Species: L. furnarius

Binomial name
- Leptodactylus furnarius Sazima & Bokermann, 1978

Synonyms
- Leptodactylus furnarius Sazima and Bokermann, 1978; Leptodactylus laurae Heyer, 1978

= Leptodactylus furnarius =

Species of amphibian

Leptodactylus furnarius is a species of frogs in the family Leptodactylidae. It is found in Brazil, Uruguay, Argentina, and Paraguay.

== Habitat ==
This frog lives in Brazil's cerrado, Atlantic forest, and pampa biomes and in ponds, swamps, and grassy places throughout its range. This frog has shown some tolerance to anthropogenic disturbance. For example, people have found it on Eucalyptus tree farms. Scientists have observed the frog between 200 and 1364 meters above sea level.

Scientists have reported the frog in some protected places, for example APA Corumbatai, Botucatu e Tejupa Perimetro Corumbatai, APA Jalapao, PARES do Jalapao, PARES Serra do Ouro Branco, PARNA da Chapada dos Veadeiros, PARNA Grande Sertao Veredas, RPPN Estancia Santa Ines, and RPPN Olavo Egydio Setubal.

== Reproduction ==
The frog lays eggs underground. The tadpoles are washed into bodies of water after hatching.

== Threats ==
The IUCN classifies this species as least concern. In some places, habitat loss in favor of agriculture, mining, and dam and other infrastructure development poses some threat.
