= Leptodactylus marambaiae =

Conservation status
- Near Threatened (IUCN 3.1)

Scientific classification
- Kingdom: Animalia
- Phylum: Chordata
- Class: Amphibia
- Order: Anura
- Family: Leptodactylidae
- Genus: Leptodactylus
- Species: L. marambaiae

Binomial name
- Leptodactylus marambaiae Izecksohn, 1976

Species of frog

Leptodactylus marambaiae is a species of frog in the family Leptodactylidae. It is endemic to Brazil.

== Habitat ==
Scientists know this frog exclusively from the type locality, and island named Restinga da Marambaia in Rio de Janeiro. They observed it as high as 600 meters above sea level.

Scientists have seen this frog in two protected places: Área de Proteção Ambiental de Mangaratiba and Área de Proteção Ambiental da Orla Marítima da Baía de Sepetiba.

== Threats ==
The IUCN classifies this frog as near threatened. Its entire range is controlled by the military, whose activities do not threaten it. Climate change may affect this frog.
