= Leptodactylus paranaru =

Conservation status
- Least Concern (IUCN 3.1)

Scientific classification
- Kingdom: Animalia
- Phylum: Chordata
- Class: Amphibia
- Order: Anura
- Family: Leptodactylidae
- Genus: Leptodactylus
- Species: L. paranaru

Binomial name
- Leptodactylus paranaru Magalhães, Lyra, Carvalho, Baldo, Brusquetti, Burella, Colli, Gehara, Giaretta, Haddad, Langone, López, Napoli, Santana, de Sá, and Garda, 2020

Species of frog

Leptodactylus paranaru is a species of frog in the family Leptodactylidae. It is endemic to Brazil.

== Habitat ==
Scientists have observed the frog in lowland forests, grasslands, and temporary bodies of water, such as ponds and flooded areas. Scientists saw the frog between 0 and 500 meters above sea level. Scientists believe this frog may have some tolerance to anthropogenic disturbance.

The frog's known range includes protected parks.

== Reproduction ==
These frogs reproduce in temporary bodies of water. The frog builds a foam nest on the water's surface for its eggs.

== Threats ==
The IUCN classifies this species as least concern of extinction. In some parts of its range, it is subject to habitat loss.
