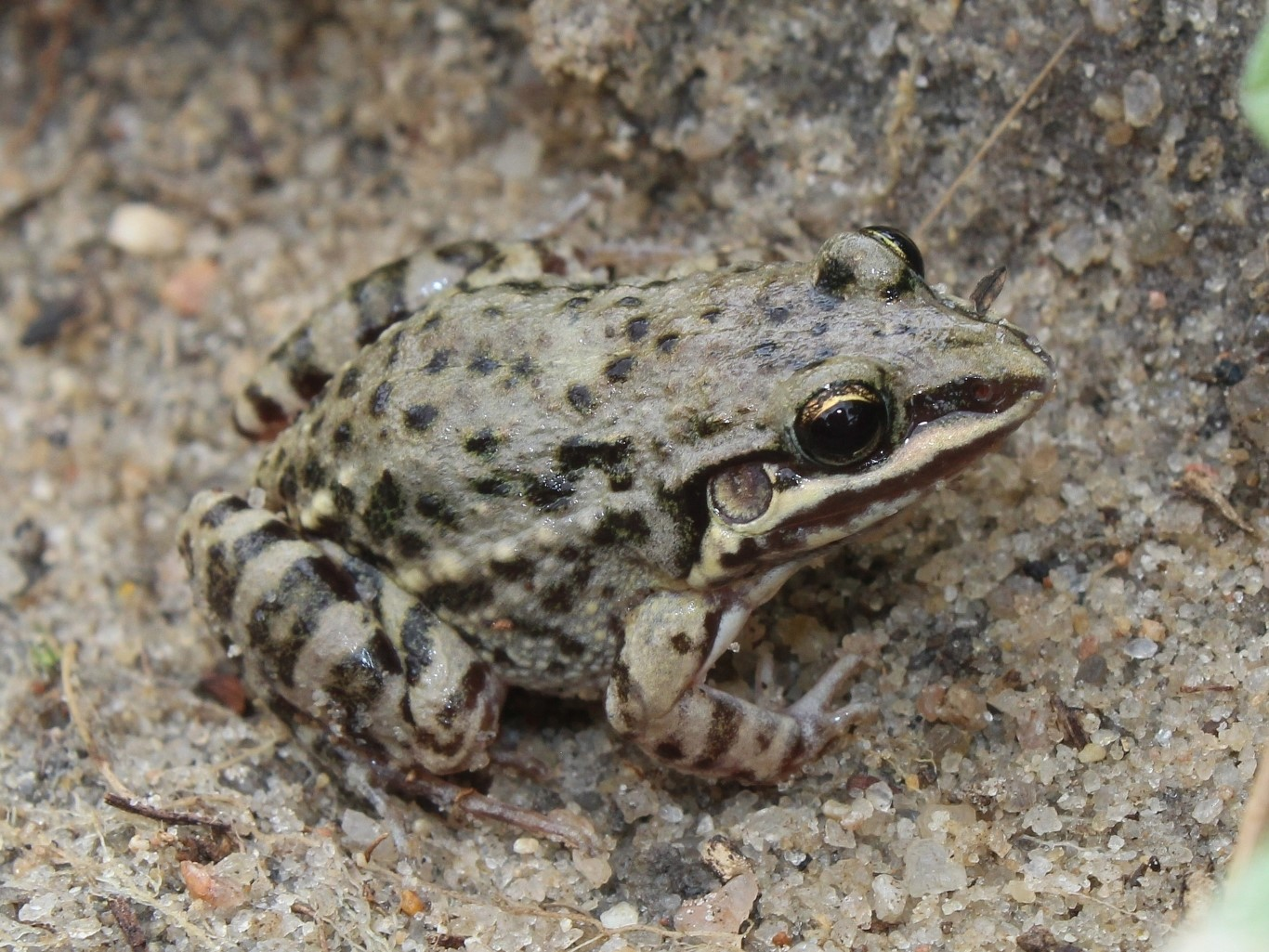

Conservation status
- Least Concern (IUCN 3.1)

Scientific classification
- Kingdom: Animalia
- Phylum: Chordata
- Class: Amphibia
- Order: Anura
- Family: Leptodactylidae
- Genus: Leptodactylus
- Species: L. caatingae

Binomial name
- Leptodactylus caatingae Heyer & Juncá, 2003

= Leptodactylus caatingae =

Species of frog

Leptodactylus caatingae is a species of frog in the family Leptodactylidae. It is endemic to the Caatinga region of north-eastern Brazil and known from Espírito Santo, Paraíba, and Bahia states. Prior to its description it was included in Leptodactylus latinasus.

== Description ==
This frog is nearly identical to Leptodactylus latinasus. They can be distinguished by their calls. Individuals in this species may differ in appearance. The skin of dorsum can have dark marks on it. Frogs can have one or two lines of marks down the back. Some frogs have thin, light pinstripes on their backs and some do not. Some frogs have stripes on their mouths and some do not. Most of these frogs have a light stripe from the face to the top of the back leg. The back legs have dark sideways lines on them. The frogs can have different marks on their bellies: Some have dark spots or patterns and some do not. Some of these frogs have white bumps on their legs and feet and some do not.

== Habitat ==
This frog lives in Caatinga, Cerrado, and Atlantic forest biomes. People have also seen it in grassy areas adjacent to forests, in gallery forest, and in open areas. It has been observed between 0 and 400 meters above sea level.

Scientists have reported these frogs in protected areas: APA do Cariri, APA Dunas e Veredas do Baixo Medio Sao Francisco, and FLONA Contendas do Sincora.

== Reproduction ==
The male frog sits in a crack or hole in the ground or between bushes and calls to the female frogs. The female frog deposits her eggs in temporary ponds. The tadpoles develop in water.

== Threats ==
The IUCN classifies this frog as least concern of extinction. This frog has shown some tolerance to habitat disturbance. In some places, the frogs are in some danger from fires and overgrazing.

== Original description ==
- Heyer, W. R.; F. A. Junca (2003). "Leptodactylus caatingae, a new species of frog from eastern Brazil (Amphibia: Anura: Leptodactylidae)". Proceedings of the Biological Society of Washington. 116: 317–329.
