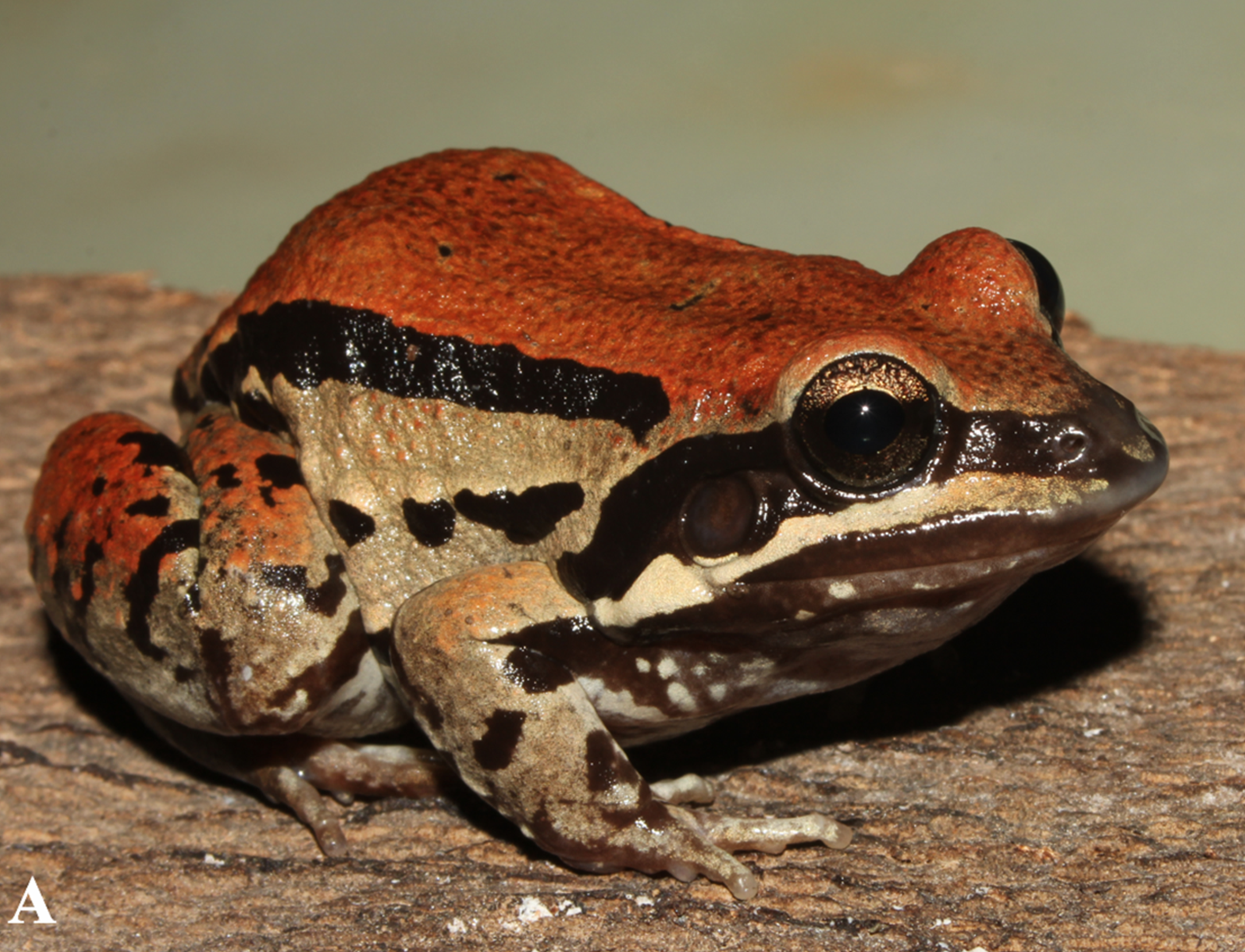

Conservation status
- Least Concern (IUCN 3.1)

Scientific classification
- Kingdom: Animalia
- Phylum: Chordata
- Class: Amphibia
- Order: Anura
- Family: Leptodactylidae
- Genus: Leptodactylus
- Species: L. apepyta

Binomial name
- Leptodactylus apepyta Schneider, Cardozo, Brusquetti, Kolenc, Borteiro, Haddad, Basso, and Baldo, 2019
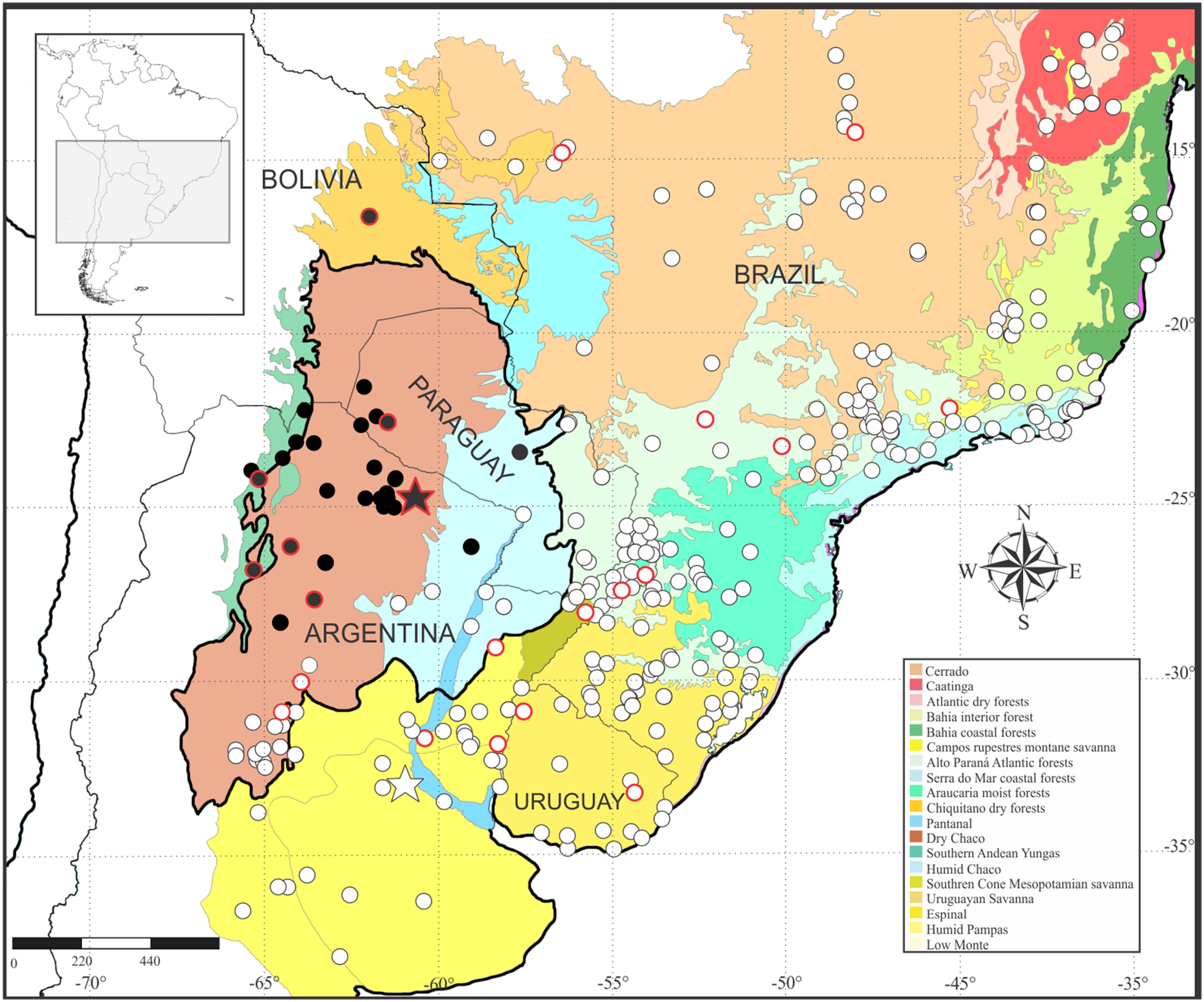
- Geographic distribution of Leptodactylus apepyta and L. mystacinus

= Leptodactylus apepyta =

Species of frog

Leptodactylus apepyta is a frog. It is endemic to Bolivia, Paraguay, and Argentina.

== Description ==
This frog measures 46.80-66.21 mm in snout-vent length. Its skin is reddish in color with black stripes. It has a round, dark tympanum.

== Habitat ==
The frog has been reported in chaco biomes and in some lowland forests. Scientists have observed the frog between 25 and 207 meters above sea level.

Scientists have seen this frog inside protected places, such as Reserva Natural Cañada del Carmen.

== Reproduction ==
The male frog perches on a fallen log or on vegetation up to 1 m above the ground and calls to the female frogs, after sunset. The frog deposits its eggs in foam nests. The tadpoles develop in water.

== Threats ==
The IUCN classifies this frog as least concern of extinction. This frog has shown some tolerance to anthropogenic disturbance. Its principal threats are deforestation, forest fires, and other form sof habitat loss, such as land conversion to cattle pasture.
