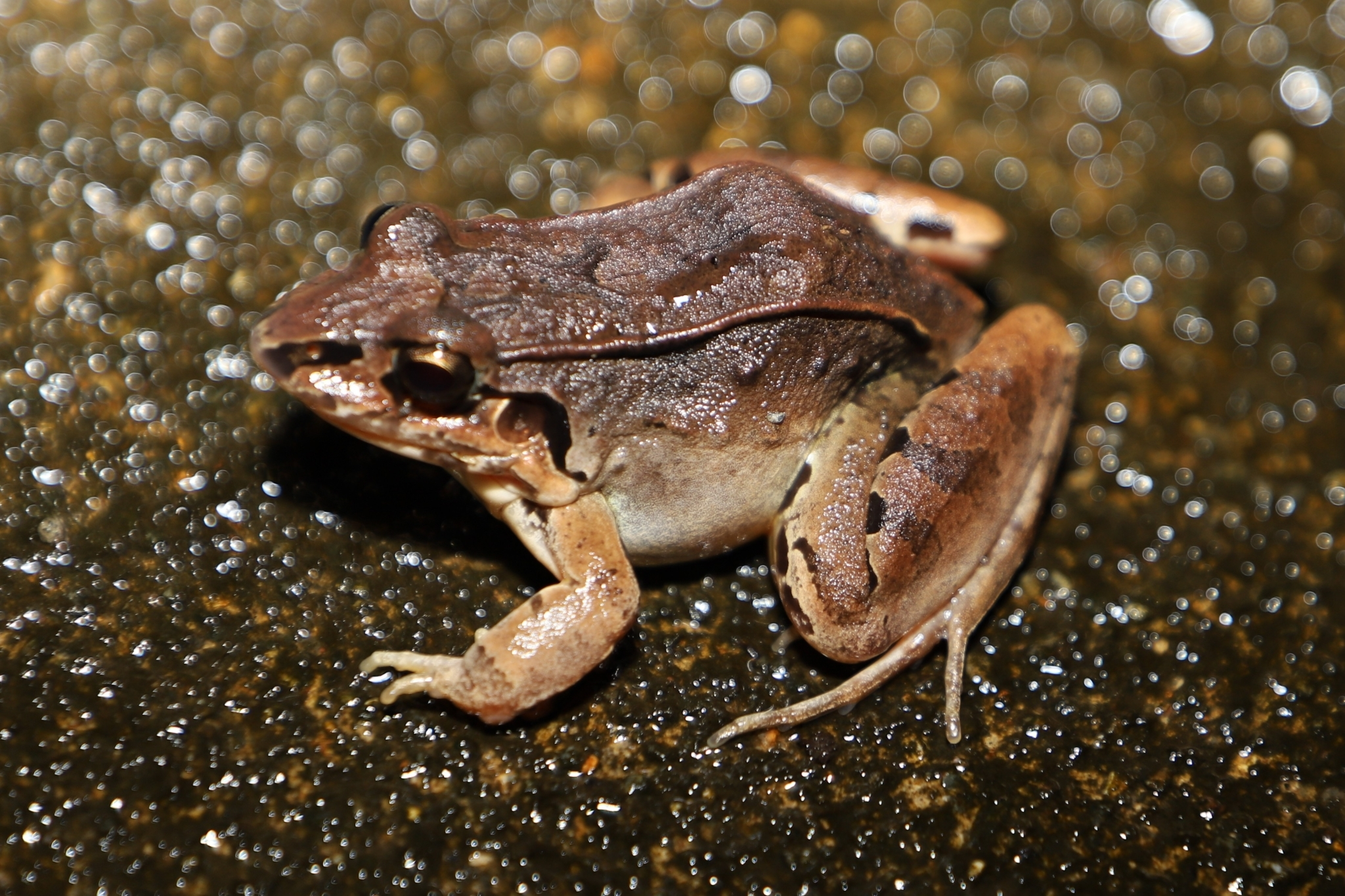

Conservation status
- Least Concern (IUCN 3.1)

Scientific classification
- Kingdom: Animalia
- Phylum: Chordata
- Class: Amphibia
- Order: Anura
- Family: Leptodactylidae
- Genus: Leptodactylus
- Species: L. poecilochilus

Binomial name
- Leptodactylus poecilochilus (Cope, 1862)

Synonyms
- Leptodactylus diptychus Boulenger, 1918

= Leptodactylus poecilochilus =

Species of frog

Leptodactylus poecilochilus is a species of frog in the family Leptodactylidae. It is found in Colombia, Costa Rica, Panama, Venezuela, and possibly Nicaragua.

== Description ==
The adult male frog measures 33 to 49 mm in snout-vent length and the adult female frog 32 to 50 mm. The head is longer than it is wide. There is some folded skin on the back. The skin of the dorsum is brown-gray in color with spots or stripes. There is a light stripe in the middle of the back. Sometimes there is dark color on the chin. The backs of the back legs have bars. There is a long white stripe on the thighs. The ventrum is white in color. The male frog's vocal slit is black. The iris of the eye is gold in color.

== Reproduction ==
This frog is an explosive breeder. The female frog desposits eggs in ponds. The tadpoles can grow as long as 40 mm at stage 40. The mouth is on the bottom of the body. The body shows blotched coloration, with darker color on the back and lighter on the belly. The caudal fin is pointed. There are spots on the tail.

== Habitat ==
Its natural habitats are subtropical or tropical dry lowland grassland, subtropical or tropical seasonally wet or flooded lowland grassland, intermittent freshwater lakes, freshwater marshes, intermittent freshwater marshes, pastureland, ponds, and canals and ditches.
