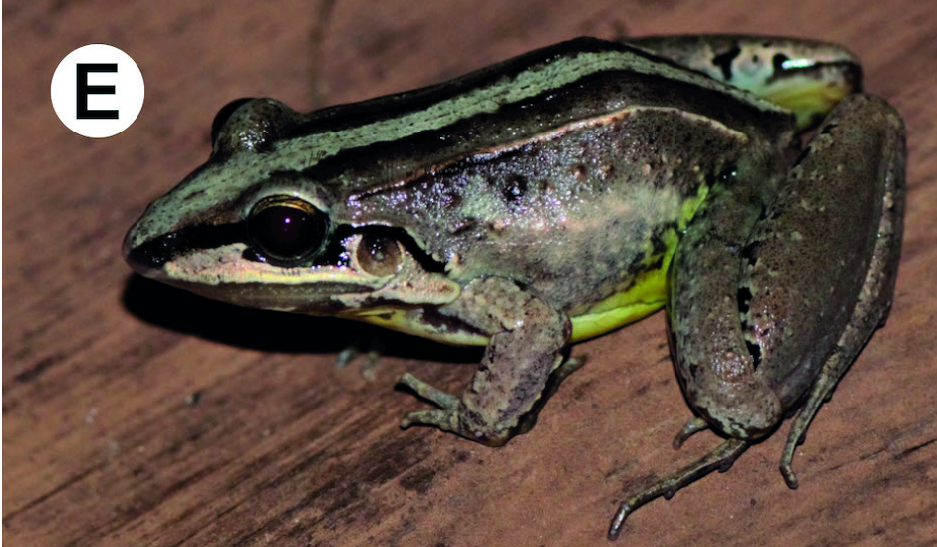

Conservation status
- Least Concern (IUCN 3.1)

Scientific classification
- Kingdom: Animalia
- Phylum: Chordata
- Class: Amphibia
- Order: Anura
- Family: Leptodactylidae
- Genus: Leptodactylus
- Species: L. longirostris

Binomial name
- Leptodactylus longirostris Boulenger, 1882

= Leptodactylus longirostris =

Species of frog

Leptodactylus longirostris is a species of frog in the family Leptodactylidae. Its local name is sapito silbador carilargo ("long-faced whistling toadlet").

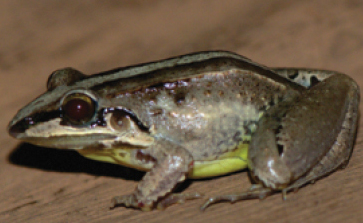
Leptodactylus longirostris

It is found in Brazil, Colombia, French Guiana, Guyana, Suriname, and Venezuela. Its natural habitats are subtropical or tropical moist lowland forests, subtropical or tropical seasonally wet or flooded lowland grassland, rivers, freshwater marshes, intermittent freshwater marshes, pastureland, and rural gardens. It is not considered threatened by the IUCN.
