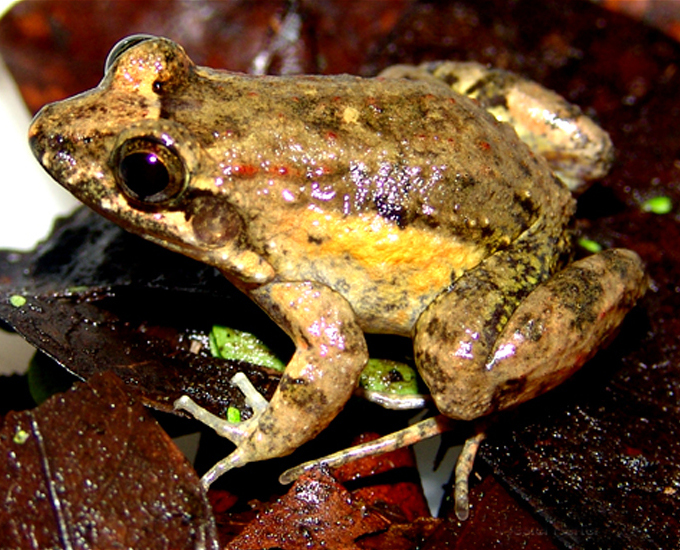

Conservation status
- Least Concern (IUCN 3.1)

Scientific classification
- Kingdom: Animalia
- Phylum: Chordata
- Class: Amphibia
- Order: Anura
- Family: Leptodactylidae
- Genus: Leptodactylus
- Species: L. natalensis

Binomial name
- Leptodactylus natalensis Lutz, 1930

= Leptodactylus natalensis =

Species of frog

Leptodactylus natalensis is a species of frog in the family Leptodactylidae. It is endemic to Brazil where it is found on the eastern coast.

== Habitat ==
Leptodactylus natalensis is a very common species. It lives in muddy places at secondary lowland forests, shrubby vegetation, and wet cow pastures near secondary forest, but not in primary forest. Breeding takes place in temporary ponds. Scientists have observed the frog as high as 900 meters above sea level, and in many protected parks.

== Description ==
Male Leptodactylus natalensis grow to a snout–vent length of 29–42 mm (1.1–1.7 in) and females to 33–49 mm (1.3–1.9 in).

== Threats ==
The IUCN classifies this species as least concern of extinction. In some parts of its range, this frog may be in some danger from clear-cutting and overgrazing.
