= Leptodactylus hylodes =

Conservation status
- Data Deficient (IUCN 3.1)

Scientific classification
- Kingdom: Animalia
- Phylum: Chordata
- Class: Amphibia
- Order: Anura
- Family: Leptodactylidae
- Genus: Leptodactylus
- Species: L. hylodes

Binomial name
- Leptodactylus hylodes (Reinhardt & Lütken, 1862)

Species of frog

Leptodactylus hylodes is a species of frog in the family Leptodactylidae. It was found at a single site: Sergipe, Brazil.

Scientists know little about its habits. It was found in an area with small forest fragments near urban areas, farms, and pastures. They suspect that, like its congeners, it lays eggs in foam nests and has some tolerance to human-altered habitats.

The species is unique within the genus Leptodactylus in that it has heterogeneous fingertips, with digits II and III bearing rounded, non-expanded tips, while digits IV and V have small ungrooved disks. Its specific epithet "hylodes" is derived from Greek, meaning "bushy." It has not been assigned to any of the four Leptodactylus species groups.
