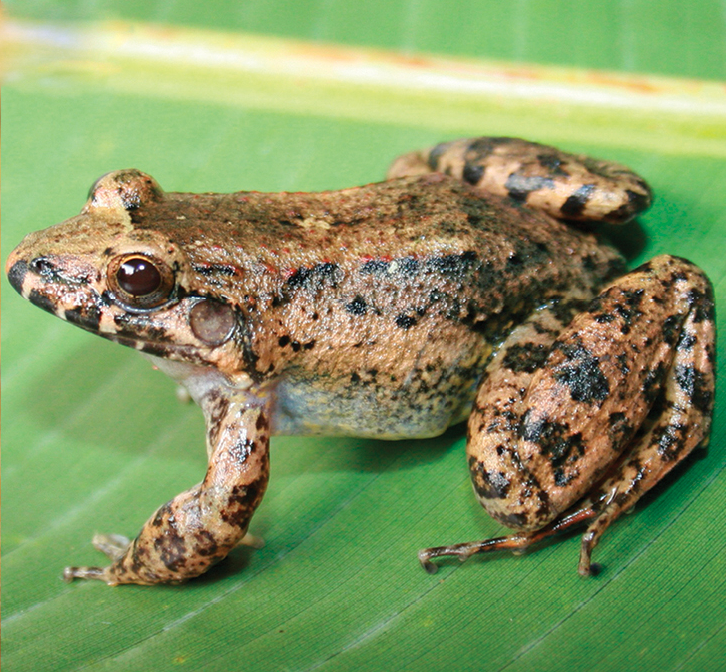

Conservation status
- Least Concern (IUCN 3.1)

Scientific classification
- Kingdom: Animalia
- Phylum: Chordata
- Class: Amphibia
- Order: Anura
- Family: Leptodactylidae
- Genus: Leptodactylus
- Species: L. colombiensis

Binomial name
- Leptodactylus colombiensis Heyer, 1994

= Leptodactylus colombiensis =

Species of frog

Leptodactylus colombiensis is a species of frog in the family Leptodactylidae. It is found in the foothills and lower slopes of the Andes in Colombia and westernmost Venezuela (Táchira).

== Habitat ==
Leptodactylus colombiensis is a common frog. It inhabits lowland and lower montane and montane humid forests. It can also be found in degraded habitats provided that there are puddles. It is a terrestrial and nocturnal species but one that is closely associated with waterbodies; it shelters on muddy holes near water.

The frog's known range contains protected parks: Tinigua National Park, Páramo de Tamá National Park, Montes de Oca Forest Reserve, Guajira Forest Reserve, Las Jaguas Private Protection Area, and San Carlos Private Protection Area.

== Description ==
Male Leptodactylus colombiensis grow to a snout–vent length of 33–56 mm (1.3–2.2 in) and females to 38–63 mm (1.5–2.5 in). This frog feeds on invertebrates.

== Relationship to humans ==
Local people sometimes use this frog as fishbait.
