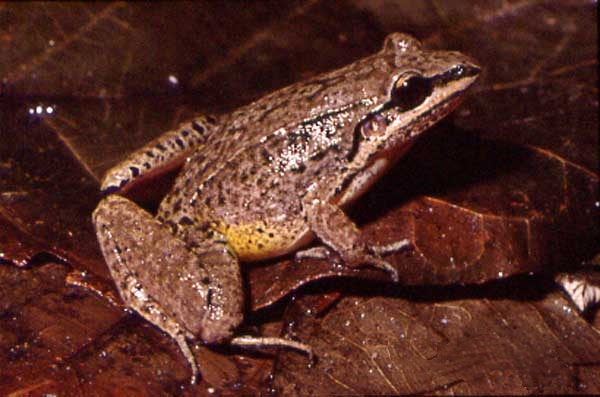

Conservation status
- Least Concern (IUCN 3.1)

Scientific classification
- Kingdom: Animalia
- Phylum: Chordata
- Class: Amphibia
- Order: Anura
- Family: Leptodactylidae
- Genus: Leptodactylus
- Species: L. notoaktites

Binomial name
- Leptodactylus notoaktites Heyer, 1978

= Leptodactylus notoaktites =

Species of frog

Leptodactylus notoaktites is a species of frog in the family Leptodactylidae. It is endemic to southeastern Brazil and is known from the states of Santa Catarina, Paraná, and São Paulo state. The common name Iporanga white-lipped frog has been coined for it.

== Etymology ==
The specific name notoaktites is derived from Greek notos (=south) and aktites (=coast dweller) and refers to the distribution of this species within Brazil.

== Description ==
Adult males measure 43–54 mm (1.7–2.1 in) and adult females 43–56 mm (1.7–2.2 in) in snout–vent length. Males have a weakly spatulate snout. The tympanum is distinct. The toes lack fringes and fleshy ridges. The dorsolateral folds are distinct, whereas the lateral folds are interrupted. The dorsum is brown with a spotted, blotched, or striped pattern. Light mid-dorsal stripes are rarely present. The upper lip has usually a light stripe.

== Habitat and conservation ==
Leptodactylus notoaktites occurs in open areas along river and forest edges and in natural and man-made openings in forests at elevations below 900 m (3,000 ft) above sea level. Males of this species start calling at the onset of the very first rains. Breeding occurs prior to the flooding. Males excavate small burrows in shallow temporary pools, and the eggs are laid in foam nests.

Leptodactylus notoaktites is a common species. It is threatened by habitat loss caused by agricultural encroachment and infrastructure development. However, it has been found in protected areas.
