= Leptodactylus avivoca =

Scientific classification
- Kingdom: Animalia
- Phylum: Chordata
- Class: Amphibia
- Order: Anura
- Family: Leptodactylidae
- Genus: Leptodactylus
- Species: L. avivoca

Binomial name
- Leptodactylus avivoca Carvalho, Seger, Magalhães, Lourenço, and Haddad, 2021

Species of frog

Leptodactylus avivoca, the bird-voiced white-lipped frog, is a species of frog in the family Leptodactylidae. It is endemic to Brazil, where it has been observed in the states of Minas Gerais and Bahia in the Espinhaço Mountains. Scientists have reported it above 700 meters above sea level.

== Original description ==
- Thiago R. Carvalho; Karin R. Seger; Felipe M. Magalhães; Luciana B. Lourenço; Célio F. B. Haddad (December 23, 2020). "Systematics and cryptic diversification of Leptodactylus frogs in the Brazilian campo rupestre". Zoologica Scripta (Abstract). doi:10.1111/zsc.12470. hdl:11449/209813.
