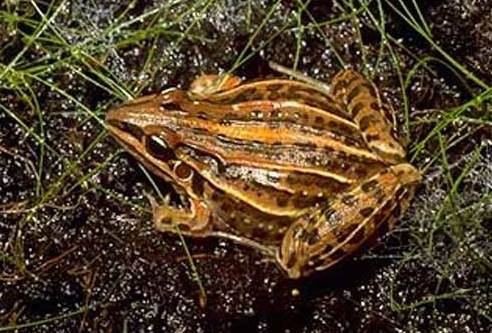

Conservation status
- Least Concern (IUCN 3.1)

Scientific classification
- Kingdom: Animalia
- Phylum: Chordata
- Class: Amphibia
- Order: Anura
- Family: Leptodactylidae
- Genus: Leptodactylus
- Species: L. plaumanni

Binomial name
- Leptodactylus plaumanni Ahl, 1936

Synonyms
- Leptodactylus geminus Barrio, 1973

= Leptodactylus plaumanni =

Species of frog

Leptodactylus plaumanni is a species of frog in the family Leptodactylidae. It is found in Argentina, Brazil, and possibly Paraguay.

== Habitat ==
Its natural habitats are savanna and the edges of forests. The frog has shown some tolerance to anthropogenic disturbance and has been found in some agricultural areas. Scientists have seen the frog between 400 and 1,200 metres (1,310 and 3,940 ft) above sea level.

Scientists have reported the frog in protected areas.

== Reproduction ==
This frog digs a burrow and builds a foam nest for its eggs. The tadpoles develop in water.

== Threats ==
The IUCN classifies this frog as least concern of extinction. In some parts of its range, the frog is in some danger from pine tree plantations and cattle pasturage.
