= Leptodactylus barrioi =

Conservation status
- Least Concern (IUCN 3.1)

Scientific classification
- Kingdom: Animalia
- Phylum: Chordata
- Class: Amphibia
- Order: Anura
- Family: Leptodactylidae
- Genus: Leptodactylus
- Species: L. barrioi

Binomial name
- Leptodactylus barrioi Alves da Silva, Magalhães, Thomassen, Leite, Garda, Brandão, Haddad, Giaretta, and Carvalho, 2020

Species of frog

Leptodactylus barrioi is a species of frog in the family Leptodactylidae. It is endemic to Brazil.

== Habitat ==
This frog is a habitat generalist. It lives in terrestrial microhabitats in savanna, closed-canopy forests, the edges of forests, marshland, both active and abandoned pasture, and cabruca, a specific type of shaded cacao farm. Scientists saw the frog between 20 and 625 meters above sea level.

== Reproduction ==
The frog deposits its eggs in a foam nest in a hole underground. Rainfall later washes the tadpoles into nearby permanent and temporary pools of water.

== Threats ==
The IUCN classifies this frog as least concern of extinction. In some parts of its range, urbanization and the development of farmland pose some threat.

== Original description ==
- Da Silva LA; FM Magalhães; H Thomassen; FSF Leite; AA Garda; RA Brandão; CFB Haddad; AA Giaretta; TR de Carvalho (2020). "Unraveling the species diversity and relationships in the Leptodactylus mystaceus complex (Anura: Leptodactylidae), with the description of three new Brazilian species". Zootaxa (Abstract). 4779: 151–189. doi:10.11646/zootaxa.4779.2.1. hdl:11449/200443. PMID 33055785.
