= List of amphibians of Brazil =

This is a list of the amphibian species recorded in Brazil. The total number of species is 946.

== Anura ==
=== Amphignathodontidae ===
- Fritziana fissilis (Miranda-Ribeiro, 1920)
- Fritziana goeldii (Boulenger, 1895)
- Fritziana ohausi (Wandolleck, 1907)
- Gastrotheca albolineata (Lutz & Lutz, 1939)
- Gastrotheca fissipes (Boulenger, 1888)
- Gastrotheca microdiscus (Andersson in Lönnberg and Andersson, 1910)

=== Aromobatidae ===
- Allobates alagoanus (Bokermann, 1967)
- Allobates brunneus (Cope, 1887)
- Allobates caeruleodactylus (Lima & Caldwell, 2001)
- Allobates capixaba (Bokermann, 1967)
- Allobates carioca (Bokermann, 1967)
- Allobates conspicuus (Morales, 2002 "2000")
- Allobates crombiei (Morales, 2002 "2000")
- Allobates femoralis (Boulenger, 1884 "1883")
- Allobates fuscellus (Morales, 2002 "2000")
- Allobates gasconi (Morales, 2002 "2000")
- Allobates goianus (Bokermann, 1975)
- Allobates marchesianus (Melin, 1941)
- Allobates masniger (Morales, 2002 "2000")
- Allobates nidicola (Caldwell & Lima, 2003)
- Allobates olfersioides (A. Lutz, 1925)
- Allobates sumtuosus (Morales, 2000)
- Allobates vanzolinius (Morales, 2000)
- Anomaloglossus baeobatrachus (Boistel and de Massari, 1999)
- Anomaloglossus beebei (Noble, 1923)
- Anomaloglossus stepheni (Martins, 1989)
- Anomaloglossus tamacuarensis (Myers & Donelly, 1997)

=== Brachycephalidae ===
- Adelophryne baturitensis Hoogmoed, Borges, & Cascon, 1994
- Adelophryne gutturosa Hoogmoed & Lescure, 1984
- Adelophryne maranguapensis Hoogmoed, Borges, & Cascon, 1994
- Adelophryne pachydactyla Hoogmoed, Borges, & Cascon, 1994
- Barycholos ternetzi (Miranda-Ribeiro, 1937)
- Brachycephalus alipioi Pombal & Gasparini, 2006
- Brachycephalus brunneus Ribeiro, Alves, Haddad & dos Reis, 2005
- Brachycephalus ferruginus Alves, Ribeiro, Haddad & dos Reis, 2006
- Brachycephalus pombali Alves, Ribeiro, Haddad & dos Reis, 2006
- Brachycephalus didactylus (Izecksohn, 1971)
- Brachycephalus ephippium (Spix, 1824)
- Brachycephalus hermogenesi (Giaretta & Sawaya, 1998)
- Brachycephalus izecksohni Ribeiro, Alves, Haddad & dos Reis, 2005
- Brachycephalus nodoterga Miranda-Ribeiro, 1920
- Brachycephalus pernix Pombal, Wistuba & Bornschein, 1998
- Brachycephalus vertebralis Pombal, 2001
- Eleutherodactylus binotatus (Spix, 1824)
- Eleutherodactylus heterodactylus (Miranda-Ribeiro, 1937)
- Eleutherodactylus nigrovittatus Andersson, 1945
- Eleutherodactylus plicifer (Boulenger, 1888)
- Ischnocnema bilineata (Bokermann, 1975 "1974")
- Ischnocnema bolbodactyla (A. Lutz, 1925)
- Ischnocnema epipeda (Heyer, 1984)
- Ischnenocnema erythromera (Heyer, 1984)
- Ischnocnema gehrti (Miranda-Ribeiro, 1926)
- Ischnocnema gualteri (B. Lutz, 1974)
- Ischnocnema guentheri (Steindachner, 1864)
- Ischnocnema henselii (Peters, 1872)
- Ischnocnema hoehnei (B. Lutz, 1959 "1958")
- Ischnocnema holti (Cochran, 1948)
- Ischnocnema izecksohni (Caramaschi and Kisteumacher, 1989 "1988")
- Ischnocnema juipoca (Sazima & Cardoso, 1978)
- Ischnocnema lactea (Miranda-Ribeiro, 1923)
- Ischnocnema manezinho (Garcia, 1996)
- Ischnocnema nasuta (A. Lutz, 1925)
- Ischnocnema nigriventris (A. Lutz, 1925)
- Ischnocnema octavioi (Bokermann, 1965)
- Ischnocnema oeus (Heyer, 1984)
- Ischnocnema paranaensis (Langone & Segalla, 1996)
- Ischnocnema parva (Girard, 1853)
- Ischnocnema paulodutrai (Bokermann, 1975 "1974")
- Ischnocnema pusilla (Bokermann, 1967)
- Ischnocnema ramagii (Boulenger, 1888)
- Ischnocnema randorum (Heyer, 1985)
- Ischnocnema sambaqui (Castanho & Haddad, 2000)
- Ischnocnema spanios (Heyer, 1985)
- Ischnocnema venancioi (B. Lutz, 1959 "1958")
- Ischnocnema verrucosus (Reinhardt and Lütken, 1862)
- Ischnocnema vinhai (Bokermann, 1975 "1974")
- Limnophys sulcatus (Cope, 1874)
- Pristimantis acuminatus (Schreve, 1935)
- Pristimantis altamazonicus (Barbour & Dunn, 1921)
- Pristimantis buccinator (Rodriguez, 1994)
- Pristimantis carvalhoi (B. Lutz in B. Lutz & Kloss, 1952)
- Pristimantis chiastonotus (Lynch & Hoogmoed, 1977)
- Pristimantis conspicillatus (Günther, 1858)
- Pristimantis crepitans (Bokermann, 1965)
- Pristimantis diadematus (Jiménez de la Espada, 1875)
- Pristimantis dundeei (Heyer & Muñoz, 1999)
- Pristomantis eurydactylus (Hedges & Schlüter, 1992)
- Pristomantis fenestratus (Steindachner, 1864)
- Pristimantis gutturalis (Hoogmoed, Lynch & Lescure, 1977)
- Pristimantis lacrimosus (Jiménez de la Espada, 1875)
- Pristimantis lanthanites (Lynch, 1975)
- Pristimantis malkini (Lynch, 1980)
- Pristimantis marmoratus (Boulenger, 1900)
- Pristimantis martiae (Lynch, 1974)
- Pristimantis memorans (Myers & Donelly, 1997)
- Pristimantis ockendeni (Boulenger, 1912)
- Pristimantis peruvianus (Melin, 1941)
- Pristimantis skydmainos (Flores & Rodriguez, 1997)
- Pristimantis toftae (Duellman, 1978)
- Pristimantis variabilis (Lynch, 1968)
- Pristimantis ventrimarmoratus (Boulenger, 1912)
- Pristimantis vilarsi (Melin, 1941)
- Pristimantis zeuctotylus (Lynch & Hoogmoed, 1977)
- Pristimantis zimmermanae (Heyer & Hardy, 1991)
- Euparkerella brasiliensis (Parker, 1926)
- Euparkerella cochranae Izecksohn, 1988
- Euparkerella robusta Izecksohn, 1988
- Euparkerella tridactyla Izecksohn, 1988
- Holoaden bradei B. Lutz, 1959 "1958"
- Holoaden luederwaldti Miranda-Ribeiro, 1920
- Oreobates quixensis Jiménez de la Espada, 1872
- Phyllonastes myrmecoides (Lynch, 1976)
- Phyzelaphryne miriamae Heyer, 1977

=== Bufonidae ===
- Atelopus flavescens Duméril & Bibron, 1841
- Atelopus spumarius Cope, 1871
- Dendrophryniscus berthalutzae Izecksohn, 1994 "1993"
- Dendrophryniscus bokermanni Izecksohn, 1994 "1993"
- Dendrophryniscus brevipollicatus Jiménez de la Espada, 1871 "1870"
- Dendrophryniscus carvalhoi Izecksohn, 1994 "1993"
- Dendrophryniscus leucomystax Izecksohn, 1968
- Dendrophryniscus minutus (Melin, 1941)
- Dendrophryniscus stawiarskyi Izecksohn, 1994 "1993"
- Frostius erythrophthalmus Pimenta & Caramaschi, 2007
- Frostius pernambucensis (Bokermann, 1962)
- Melanophryniscus admirabilis Di Bernardo, Maneyro & Grillo, 2006
- Melanophryniscus atroluteus (Miranda-Ribeiro, 1920)
- Melanophryniscus cambaraensis Braun & Braun, 1979
- Melanophryniscus devincenzii Klappenbach, 1968
- Melanophryniscus dorsalis (Mertens, 1933)
- Melanophryniscus fulvoguttatus (Mertens, 1937)
- Melanophryniscus macrogranulosus Braun, 1973
- Melanophryniscus montevidensis (Philippi, 1902)
- Melanophryniscus moreirae (Miranda-Ribeiro, 1920)
- Melanophryniscus pachyrhynus (Miranda-Ribeiro, 1920)
- Melanophryniscus simplex Caramaschi & Cruz, 2002
- Melanophryniscus spectabilis Caramaschi & Cruz, 2002
- Melanophryniscus tumifrons (Boulenger, 1905)
- Oreophrynella quelchii Boulenger, 1895
- Oreophrynella weiassipuensis Señaris, do Nascimento & Villarreal, 2005
- Rhaebo anderssoni (Melin, 1941)
- Rhaebo guttatus (Schneider, 1799)
- Rhamphophryne proboscidea (Boulenger, 1882)
- Rhinella abei (Baldissera-Jr, Caramaschi & Haddad, 2004)
- Rhinella achavali (Maneyro, Arrieta & de Sá, 2004)
- Rhinella acutirostris (Spix, 1824)
- Rhinella arenarum (Hensel, 1867)
- Rhinella bergi (Céspedez, 2000 "1999")
- Rhinella castaneotica (Caldwell, 1991)
- Rhinella ceratophrys (Boulenger, 1882)
- Rhinella cerradensis Maciel, Brandão, Campos & Sebben, 2007
- Rhinella crucifer (Wied-Neuwied, 1821)
- Rhinella dapsilis (Myers & Carvalho, 1945)
- Rhinella dorbignyi (Duméril & Bibron, 1841)
- Rhinella fernandezae (Gallardo, 1957)
- Rhinella granulosa (Spix, 1824)
- Rhinella henseli (A. Lutz, 1934)
- Rhinella hoogmoedi Caramaschi & Pombal, 2006
- Rhinella icterica (Spix, 1824)
- Rhinella jimi (Stevaux, 2002)
- Rhinella margaritifera (Laurenti, 1768 )
- Rhinella marina (Linnaeus, 1758)
- Rhinella ocellata (Günther, 1859 "1858")
- Rhinella ornata (Spix, 1824)
- Rhinella pombali (Baldissera-Jr, Caramaschi & Haddad, 2004)
- Rhinella proboscidea (Spix, 1824)
- Rhinella pygmaea (Myers & Carvalho, 1952)
- Rhinella roqueana (Melin, 1941)
- Rhinella rubescens (A. Lutz, 1925)
- Rhinella schneideri (Werner, 1894)
- Rhinella scitula (Caramaschi & Niemeyer, 2003)
- Rhinella veredas (Brandão, Maciel & Sebben, 2007)

=== Centrolenidae ===
- Allophryne ruthveni Gaige, 1926
- Cochranella midas (Lynch & Duellman, 1973)
- Cochranella oyampiensis (Lescure, 1975)
- Cochranella ritae (B. Lutz in B. Lutz & Kloss, 1952)
- Hyalinobatrachium eurygnathum (A. Lutz, 1925)
- Hyalinobatrachium nouraguensis Lescure & Marty, 2000
- Hyalinobatrachium parvulum (Boulenger, 1895 "1894")
- Hyalinobatrachium uranoscopum (Müller, 1924)

=== Ceratophryidae ===
- Ceratophrys aurita (Raddi, 1823)
- Ceratophrys cornuta (Linnaeus, 1758)
- Ceratophrys cranwelli Barrio, 1980
- Ceratophrys joazeirensis Mercadal de Barrio, 1986
- Ceratophrys ornata (Bell, 1843)

=== Cryptobatrachidae ===
- Stefania tamacuarina Myers and Donnelly, 1997

=== Cycloramphidae ===
- Crossodactylodes bokermanni Peixoto, 1983 "1982"
- Crossodactylodes izecksohni Peixoto, 1983 "1982"
- Crossodactylodes pintoi Cochran, 1938
- Cycloramphus acangatan Verdade & Rodrigues, 2003
- Cycloramphus asper Werner, 1899
- Cycloramphus bandeirensis Heyer, 1983
- Cycloramphus bolitoglossus (Werner, 1897
- Cycloramphus boraceiensis Heyer, 1983
- Cycloramphus brasiliensis (Steindachner, 1864)
- Cycloramphus carvalhoi Heyer, 1983
- Cycloramphus catarinensis Heyer, 1983
- Cycloramphus cedrensis Heyer, 1983
- Cycloramphus diringshofeni Bokermann, 1957
- Cycloramphus dubius (Miranda-Ribeiro, 1920)
- Cycloramphus duseni (Andersson, 1914)
- Cycloramphus eleutherodactylus (Miranda-Ribeiro, 1920)
- Cycloramphus fulginosus Tschudi, 1838
- Cycloramphus granulosus A. Lutz, 1929
- Cycloramphus izecksohni Heyer, 1983
- Cycloramphus jordanensis Heyer, 1983
- Cycloramphus juimirim Haddad & Sazima, 1989
- Cycloramphus lutzorum Heyer, 1983
- Cycloramphus migueli Heyer, 1988
- Cycloramphus mirandaribeiroi Heyer, 1983
- Cycloramphus ohausi (Wandolleck, 1907)
- Cycloramphus rhyakonastes Heyer, 1983
- Cycloramphus semipalmatus (Miranda-Ribeiro, 1920)
- Cycloramphus stejnegeri (Noble, 1924)
- Cycloramphus valae Heyer, 1983
- Limnomedusa macroglossa (Duméril & Bibron, 1841)
- Macrogenioglottus alipioi Carvalho, 1946
- Odontophrynus americanus (Duméril & Bibron, 1841)
- Odontophrynus carvalhoi Savage & Cei, 1965
- Odontophrynus cultripes Reinhardt & Lütken, 1861 "1862"
- Odontophrynus moratoi Jim & Caramaschi, 1980
- Odontophrynus salvatori Caramaschi, 1996
- Proceratophrys appendiculata (Günther, 1873)
- Proceratophrys avelinoi Mercadal del Barrio & Barrio, 1993
- Proceratophrys bigibbosa (Peters, 1872)
- Proceratophrys boiei (Wied-Neuwied, 1825)
- Proceratophrys brauni Kwet & Faivovich, 2001
- Proceratophrys concavitympanum Giaretta, Bernarde, & Kokubum, 2000
- Proceratophrys cristiceps (Müller, 1884 "1883")
- Proceratophrys cururu Eterovick & Sazima, 1998
- Proceratophrys fryi (Günther, 1873)
- Proceratophrys goyana (Miranda-Ribeiro, 1937)
- Proceratophrys laticeps Izecksohn & Peixoto, 1981
- Proceratophrys melanopogon (Miranda-Ribeiro, 1926)
- Proceratophrys moehringi Weygoldt & Peixoto, 1985
- Proceratophrys palustris Giaretta & Sazima, 1993
- Proceratophrys paviotii Cruz, Prado & Izecksohn, 2005
- Proceratophrys phyllostomus Izecksohn, Cruz, & Peixoto, 1999 "1998"
- Proceratophrys schirchi (Miranda-Ribeiro, 1937)
- Proceratophrys subguttata Izecksohn, Cruz, & Peixoto, 1999 "1998"
- Rupirana cardosoi Heyer, 1999
- Thoropa lutzi Cochran, 1938
- Thoropa megatympanum Caramaschi & Sazima, 1984
- Thoropa miliaris (Spix, 1824)
- Thoropa petropolitana (Wandolleck, 1907)
- Thoropa saxatilis Crocoft & Heyer, 1988
- Thoropa taophora (Miranda-Ribeiro, 1923)
- Zachaenus carvalhoi Izecksohn, 1983 "1982"
- Zachaenus parvulus (Girard, 1853)

=== Dendrobatidae ===
- Adelphobates castaneoticus (Caldwell & Myers, 1990)
- Adelphobates galactonotus (Steindachner, 1864)
- Adelphobates quinquevittatus (Steindachner, 1864)
- Ameerega braccata (Steindachner, 1864)
- Ameerega flavopicta (A. Lutz, 1925)
- Ameerega hahneli (Boulenger, 1884 "1883")
- Ameerega macero (Rodriguez & Myers, 1993)
- Ameerega petersi (Silverstone, 1976)
- Ameerega picta (Bibron in Tschudi, 1838)
- Ameerega pulchripecta (Silverstone, 1976)
- Ameerega trivittata (Spix, 1824)
- Colostethus subfolionidificans Lima, Sanchez & Souza, 2007
- Dendrobates leucomelas Steindachner, 1864
- Dendrobates tinctorius (Cuvier, 1797)
- Hyloxalus peruvianus (Melin, 1941)
- Hyloxalus chlorocraspedus (Caldwell, 2005)
- Ranitomeya vanzolinii (Myers, 1982)
- Ranitomeya ventrimaculata (Shreve, 1935)

=== Hemiphractidae ===
- Hemiphractus johnsoni (Noble, 1917)
- Hemiphractus scutatus (Spix, 1824)

=== Hylidae ===
- Aparasphenodon bokermanni Pombal, 1993
- Aparasphenodon brunoi Miranda-Ribeiro, 1920
- Aparasphenodon venezolanus (Mertens, 1950)
- Aplastodiscus albofrenatus (A. Lutz, 1924)
- Aplastodiscus albosignatus (A.Lutz & B.Lutz, 1938)
- Aplastodiscus arildae (Cruz & Peixoto, 1987 "1985")
- Aplastodiscus callipygius (Cruz & Peixoto, 1985 "1984")
- Aplastodiscus cavicola (Cruz & Peixoto, 1985 "1984")
- Aplastodiscus cochranae (Mertens, 1952)
- Aplastodiscus ehrhardti (Müller, 1924)
- Aplastodiscus eugenioi (Carvalho-e-Silva & Carvalho-e-Silva, 2005)
- Aplastodiscus flumineus (Cruz & Peixoto, 1985 "1984")
- Aplastodiscus ibirapitanga (Cruz, Pimenta & Silvano, 2003)
- Aplastodiscus leucopygius (Cruz & Peixoto, 1985 "1984")
- Aplastodiscus musicus (B.Lutz, 1948)
- Aplastodiscus perviridis A. Lutz in B. Lutz, 1950
- Aplastodiscus sibilatus (Cruz, Pimenta & Silvano, 2003)
- Aplastodiscus weygoldti (Cruz & Peixoto, 1987 "1985")
- Bokermannohyla ahenea (Napoli & Caramaschi, 2004)
- Bokermannohyla alvarengai (Bokermann, 1956)
- Bokermannohyla astartea (Bokermann, 1977)
- Bokermannohyla caramaschii (Napoli, 2005)
- Bokermannohyla carvalhoi (Peixoto, 1981)
- Bokermannohyla circumdata (Cope, 1871)
- Bokermannohyla claresignata (A. Lutz & B. Lutz, 1939)
- Bokermannohyla clepsydra (A. Lutz, 1925)
- Bokermannohyla diamantina Napoli & Juncá, 2006
- Bokermannohyla feioi (Napoli & Caramaschi, 2004)
- Bokermannohyla gouveai (Peixoto & Cruz, 1992)
- Bokermannohyla hylax (Heyer, 1985)
- Bokermannohyla ibitiguara (Cardoso, 1983)
- Bokermannohyla ibitipoca (Caramaschi & Feio, 1990)
- Bokermannohyla itapoty Lugli & Haddad, 2006
- Bokermannohyla izecksohni (Jim & Caramaschi, 1979)
- Bokermannohyla langei (Bokermann, 1965)
- Bokermannohyla lucianae (Napoli & Pimenta, 2003)
- Bokermannohyla luctuosa (Pombal & Haddad, 1993)
- Bokermannohyla martinsi (Bokermann, 1964)
- Bokermannohyla nanuzae (Bokermann & Sazima, 1973)
- Bokermannohyla oxente Lugli & Haddad, 2006
- Bokermannohyla pseudopseudis (Miranda-Ribeiro, 1937)
- Bokermannohyla ravida (Caramaschi, Napoli & Bernardes, 2001)
- Bokermannohyla saxicola (Bokermann, 1964)
- Bokermannohyla sazimai (Cardoso & Andrade, 1983 "1982")
- Bokermannohyla vulcaniae (Vasconcelos & Giaretta, 2004 "2003")
- Corythomantis greeningi Boulenger, 1896
- Cruziohyla craspedopus (Funkhouser, 1957)
- Dendropsophus acreanus (Bokermann, 1964)
- Dendropsophus anataliasiasi (Bokermann, 1972)
- Dendropsophus anceps (A. Lutz, 1929)
- Dendropsophus araguaya (Napoli & Caramaschi, 1998)
- Dendropsophus berthalutzae (Bokermann, 1962)
- Dendropsophus bifurcus (Andersson, 1945)
- Dendropsophus bipunctatus (Spix, 1824)
- Dendropsophus bokermanni (Goin, 1960)
- Dendropsophus branneri (Cochran, 1948)
- Dendropsophus brevifrons (Duellman & Crump, 1974)
- Dendropsophus cachimbo (Napoli & Caramaschi, 1999)
- Dendropsophus cerradensis (Napoli & Caramaschi, 1998)
- Dendropsophus cruzi (Pombal & Bastos, 1998)
- Dendropsophus decipiens (A. Lutz, 1925)
- Dendropsophus dutrai (Gomes & Peixoto, 1996)
- Dendropsophus elegans (Wied-Neuwied, 1824)
- Dendropsophus elianeae (Napoli & Caramaschi, 2000)
- Dendropsophus giesleri (Mertens, 1950)
- Dendropsophus haddadi (Bastos & Pombal, 1996)
- Dendropsophus haraldschultzi (Bokermann, 1962)
- Dendropsophus jimi (Napoli & Caramaschi, 1999)
- Dendropsophus koechlini (Duellman & Trueb, 1989)
- Dendropsophus leali (Bokermann, 1964)
- Dendropsophus leucophyllatus (Beireis, 1783)
- Dendropsophus limai (Bokermann, 1962)
- Dendropsophus marmoratus (Laurenti, 1768
- Dendropsophus melanargyreus (Cope, 1887)
- Dendropsophus meridianus (B. Lutz, 1954)
- Dendropsophus microcephalus (Cope, 1886)
- Dendropsophus microps (Peter, 1872)
- Dendropsophus minimus (Ahl, 1933)
- Dendropsophus minusculus (Rivero, 1971)
- Dendropsophus minutus (Peters, 1872)
- Dendropsophus miyatai (Vigle and Goberdhan-Vigle, 1990)
- Dendropsophus nahdereri (B. Lutz & Bokermann, 1963)
- Dendropsophus nanus (Boulenger, 1889)
- Dendropsophus novaisi (Bokermann, 1968)
- Dendropsophus oliveirai (Bokermann, 1963)
- Dendropsophus parviceps (Boulenger, 1882)
- Dendropsophus pauiniensis (Heyer, 1977)
- Dendropsophus pseudomeridianus (Cruz, Caramaschi & Dias, 2000)
- Dendropsophus rhea (Napoli & Caramaschi, 1999)
- Dendropsophus rhodopeplus (Günther, 1859 "1858")
- Dendropsophus riveroi (Cochran & Goin, 1970)
- Dendropsophus rossalleni (Goin, 1959)
- Dendropsophus rubicundulus (Reinhardt & Lütken, 1862 "1861")
- Dendropsophus ruschii (Weygoldt & Peixoto, 1987)
- Dendropsophus sanborni (Schmidt, 1944)
- Dendropsophus sarayacuensis (Shreve, 1935)
- Dendropsophus schubarti (Bokermann, 1963)
- Dendropsophus seniculus (Cope, 1868)
- Dendropsophus soaresi (Caramaschi & Jim, 1983)
- Dendropsophus studerae (Carvalho e Silva, Carvalho e Silva & Izecksohn,
- Dendropsophus timbeba (Martins & Cardoso, 1987)
- Dendropsophus tintinnabulum (Melin, 1941)
- Dendropsophus triangulum (Günther, 1869 "1868")
- Dendropsophus tritaeniatus (Bokermann, 1965)
- Dendropsophus walfordi (Bokermann, 1962)
- Dendropsophus werneri (Cochran, 1952)
- Dendropsophus xapuriensis (Martins & Cardoso, 1987)
- Ecnomiohyla tuberculosa (Boulenger, 1882)
- Hyla imitator (Barbour & Dunn, 1921) incertae sedis
- Hyla inframaculata Boulenger, 1882 incertae sedis
- Calamita melanorabdotus sensu Frost, 2006 "Hyla" melanorhabdota, 1799)
- Hylomantis aspera Peters, 1873 "1872"
- Hylomantis granulosa (Cruz, 1989 "1988")
- Hypsiboas albomarginatus (Spix, 1824)
- Hypsiboas albopunctatus (Spix, 1824)
- Hypsiboas atlanticus (Caramaschi & Velosa, 1996)
- Hypsiboas beckeri (Caramaschi & Cruz, 2004)
- Hypsiboas benitezi (Rivero, 1961)
- Hypsiboas bischoffi (Boulenger, 1887)
- Hypsiboas boans (Linnaeus, 1758)
- Hypsiboas buriti (Caramaschi & Cruz, 1999)
- Hypsiboas caingua (Carrizo, 1991 "1990")
- Hypsiboas calcaratus (Troschel in Schomburgk, 1848)
- Hypsiboas cinerascens (Spix, 1824)
- Hypsiboas cipoensis (B.Lutz, 1968)
- Hypsiboas crepitans (Wied-Neuwied, 1824)
- Hypsiboas cymbalum (Bokerman, 1963)
- Hypsiboas dentei (Bokermann, 1967)
- Hypsiboas ericae (Caramaschi & Cruz, 2000)
- Hypsiboas exastis (Caramaschi & Rodriguez, 2003)
- Hypsiboas faber (Wied-Neuwied, 1821)
- Hypsiboas fasciatus (Günther, 1859 "1858")
- Hypsiboas freicanecae (Carnaval & Peixoto, 2004)
- Hypsiboas geographicus (Spix, 1824)
- Hypsiboas goianus (B. Lutz, 1968)
- Hypsiboas guentheri (Boulenger, 1886)
- Hypsiboas joaquini (Lutz, 1968)
- Hypsiboas lanciformis (Cope, 1871)
- Hypsiboas latistriatus (Caramaschi & Cruz, 2004)
- Hypsiboas leptolineatus (P. Braun & C. Braun, 1977)
- Hypsiboas leucocheilus (Carmaschi & Niemeyer, 2003)
- Hypsiboas lundii (Burmeister, 1856)
- Hypsiboas marginatus (Boulenger, 1887)
- Hypsiboas microderma (Pyburn, 1977)
- Hypsiboas multifasciatus (Günther, 1859 "1858")
- Hypsiboas ornatissimus (Noble, 1923)
- Hypsiboas pardalis (Spix, 1824)
- Hypsiboas phaeopleura (Caramaschi & Cruz, 2000)
- Hypsiboas polytaenius (Cope, 1870 "1869")
- Hypsiboas pombali (Caramaschi, Pimenta & Feio, 2004)
- Hypsiboas prasinus (Burmeister, 1856)
- Hypsiboas pulchellus (Duméril & Bibron, 1841)
- Hypsiboas punctatus (Schneider, 1799)
- Hypsiboas raniceps Cope, 1862
- Hypsiboas secedens (B. Lutz, 1963)
- Hypsiboas semiguttatus (A. Lutz, 1925)
- Hypsiboas semilineatus (Spix, 1824)
- Hypsiboas stenocephalus (Caramaschi & Cruz, 1999)
- Hypsiboas wavrini (Parker, 1936)
- Itapotihyla langsdorffii (Duméril & Bibron, 1841)
- Lysapsus caraya Gallardo, 1964
- Lysapsus laevis Parker, 1935
- Lysapsus limellum Cope, 1862
- Osteocephalus buckleyi (Boulenger, 1882)
- Osteocephalus cabrerai (Cochran & Goin, 1970)
- Osteocephalus exophthalmus Smith & Noonan, 2001
- Osteocephalus leprieurii (Duméril & Bibron, 1841)
- Osteocephalus oophagus Jungfer & Schiesari, 1995
- Osteocephalus pearsoni (Gaige, 1929)
- Osteocephalus subtilis Martins & Cardoso, 1987
- Osteocephalus taurinus Steindachner, 1862
- Phasmahyla cochranae (Bokermann, 1966)
- Phasmahyla exilis (Cruz, 1980)
- Phasmahyla guttata (A. Lutz, 1924)
- Phasmahyla jandaia (Bokermann & Sazima, 1978)
- Phrynomedusa appendiculata (Lutz, 1925)
- Phrynomedusa bokermanni Cruz, 1991
- Phrynomedusa fimbriata Miranda-Ribeiro, 1923
- Phrynomedusa marginata (Izecksohn & Cruz, 1976)
- Phrynomedusa vanzolinii Cruz, 1991
- Phyllodytes acuminatus Bokermann, 1966
- Phyllodytes brevirostris Peixoto & Cruz, 1988
- Phyllodytes edelmoi Peixoto, Caramaschi & Freire, 2003
- Phyllodytes gyrinaethes Peixoto, Caramaschi & Freire, 2003
- Phyllodytes kautskyi Peixoto & Cruz, 1988
- Phyllodytes luteolus Wied-Neuwied, 1824
- Phyllodytes maculosus Cruz, Feio & Cardoso, "2006" 2007
- Phyllodytes melanomystax Caramaschi, Da Silva & Britto-Pereira, 1992
- Phyllodytes punctatus Caramaschi & Peixoto, 2004
- Phyllodytes tuberculosus Bokermann, 1966
- Phyllodytes wuchereri (Peters, 1873 "1872")
- Phyllomedusa araguari Giaretta, Oliveira-Filho & Kokubum, 2007
- Phyllomedusa atelopoides Duellman, Cadle, & Cannatella, 1988
- Phyllomedusa ayeaye (B. Lutz, 1966)
- Phyllomedusa azurea Cope, 1862
- Phyllomedusa bahiana A. Lutz, 1925
- Phyllomedusa bicolor (Boddaert, 1772)
- Phyllomedusa boliviana Boulenger, 1902
- Phyllomedusa burmeisteri Boulenger, 1882
- Phyllomedusa camba De la Riva, 2000 "1999"
- Phyllomedusa centralis Bokermann, 1965
- Phyllomedusa distincta A. Lutz in B. Lutz, 1950
- Phyllomedusa hypochondrialis (Daudin, 1800)
- Phyllomedusa iheringii Boulenger, 1885
- Phyllomedusa itacolomi Caramaschi, Cruz & Feio, 2006
- Phyllomedusa megacephala (Miranda-Ribeiro, 1926)
- Phyllomedusa nordestina Caramaschi, 2006
- Phyllomedusa oreades Brandão, 2002
- Phyllomedusa palliata Peters, 1873 "1872"
- Phyllomedusa rohdei Mertens, 1926
- Phyllomedusa sauvagii Boulenger, 1882
- Phyllomedusa tarsius (Cope, 1868)
- Phyllomedusa tetraploidea Pombal & Haddad, 1992
- Phyllomedusa tomopterna (Cope, 1868)
- Phyllomedusa vaillantii Boulenger, 1882
- Pseudis bolbodactyla A. Lutz, 1925
- Pseudis cardosoi Kwet, 2000
- Pseudis fusca Garman, 1883
- Pseudis minuta Günther, 1859 "1858"
- Pseudis paradoxa (Linnaeus, 1758)
- Pseudis platensis Gallardo, 1961
- Pseudis tocantins Caramaschi & Cruz, 1998
- Scarthyla goinorum (Bokermann, 1962)
- Scinax acuminatus (Cope, 1862)
- Scinax agilis (Cruz & Peixoto, 1983)
- Scinax albicans (Bokermann, 1967)
- Scinax alcatraz (B. Lutz, 1973)
- Scinax alter (B. Lutz, 1973)
- Scinax angrensis (B. Lutz, 1973)
- Scinax arduous Peixoto, 2002
- Scinax argyreornatus (Miranda-Ribeiro, 1926)
- Scinax ariadne (B. Lutz, 1973)
- Scinax atratus (Peixoto, 1989)
- Scinax auratus (Wied-Neuwied, 1821)
- Scinax baumgardneri (Rivero, 1961)
- Scinax berthae (Barrio, 1962)
- Scinax blairi (Fouquette & Pyburn, 1972)
- Scinax boesemani (Goin, 1966)
- Scinax brieni (Witte, 1930)
- Scinax cabralensis Drummond, Baêta & Pires, 2007
- Scinax caldarum (B. Lutz, 1968)
- Scinax canastrensis (Cardoso & Haddad, 1982)
- Scinax cardosoi (Carvalho e Silva & Peixoto, 1991)
- Scinax carnevallii (Caramaschi & Kisteumacher, 1989)
- Scinax catharinae (Boulenger, 1888)
- Scinax centralis Pombal & Bastos, 1996
- Scinax constrictus Lima, Bastos & Giaretta, 2004
- Scinax crospedospilus (A. Lutz, 1925)
- Scinax cruentommus (Duellman, 1972)
- Scinax curicica Pugliesse, Pombal & Sazima, 2004
- Scinax cuspidatus (A. Lutz, 1925)
- Scinax dolloi (Werner, 1903)
- Scinax duartei (B. Lutz, 1951)
- Scinax eurydice (Bokermann, 1968)
- Scinax exiguus (Duellman, 1986)
- Scinax faivovichi Brasileiro, Oyamaguchi & Haddad, 2007
- Scinax flavoguttatus (Lutz & Lutz, 1939)
- Scinax funereus (Cope, 1874)
- Scinax fuscomarginatus (A. Lutz, 1925)
- Scinax fuscovarius (A. Lutz, 1925)
- Scinax garbei (Miranda-Ribeiro, 1926)
- Scinax granulatus (Peters, 1871)
- Scinax hayii (Barbour, 1909)
- Scinax heyeri (Peixoto & Weygoldt, 1986)
- Scinax hiemalis (Haddad & Pombal, 1987)
- Scinax humilis (B. Lutz, 1954)
- Scinax jureia (Pombal & Gordo, 1991)
- Scinax kautskyi (Carvalho e Silva & Peixoto, 1991)
- Scinax lindsayi Pyburn, 1992
- Scinax littoralis (Pombal & Gordo, 1991)
- Scinax littoreus (Peixoto, 1988)
- Scinax longilineus (B. Lutz, 1968)
- Scinax luizotavioi (Caramaschi & Kisteumacher, 1989)
- Scinax machadoi (Bokermann & Sazima, 1973)
- Scinax maracaya (Cardoso & Sazima, 1980)
- Scinax melloi (Peixoto, 1989)
- Scinax nasicus (Cope, 1862)
- Scinax nebulosus (Spix, 1824)
- Scinax obtriangulatus (B. Lutz, 1973)
- Scinax pachycrus (Miranda-Ribeiro, 1937)
- Scinax parkeri (Gaige, 1929)
- Scinax peixotoi Brasileiro, Haddad, Sawaya & Martins, 2007
- Scinax perereca Pombal, Haddad & Kasahara, 1995
- Scinax perpusillus (A. Lutz & B. Lutz, 1939)
- Scinax pinima (Bokermann & Sazima, 1973)
- Scinax proboscideus (Brongersma, 1933)
- Scinax ranki (Andrade & Cardoso, 1987)
- Scinax rizibilis (Bokermann, 1964)
- Scinax ruber (Laurenti, 1768)
- Scinax similis (Cochran, 1952)
- Scinax squalirostris (A. Lutz, 1925)
- Scinax strigilatus (Spix, 1824)
- Scinax trapicheiroi (B. Lutz, 1954)
- Scinax trilineatus (Hoogmoed & Gorzula, 1977)
- Scinax uruguayus (Schmidt, 1944)
- Scinax v-signatus (B. Lutz, 1968)
- Scinax x-signatus (Spix, 1824)
- Sphaenorhynchus bromelicola Bokermann, 1966
- Sphaenorhynchus carneus (Cope, 1868)
- Sphaenorhynchus dorisae (Goin, 1957)
- Sphaenorhynchus lacteus (Daudin, 1800)
- Sphaenorhynchus orophilus (A. Lutz & B. Lutz, 1938)
- Sphaenorhynchus palustris Bokermann, 1966
- Sphaenorhynchus pauloalvini Bokermann, 1973
- Sphaenorhynchus planicola (A. Lutz & B. Lutz, 1938)
- Sphaenorhynchus prasinus Bokermann, 1973
- Sphaenorhynchus surdus (Cochran, 1953)
- Trachycephalus adenodermus (Lutz, 1968)
- Trachycephalus atlas Bokermann, 1966
- Trachycephalus coriaceus (Peters, 1867)
- Trachycephalus imitatrix (Miranda-Ribeiro, 1926)
- Trachycephalus lepidus (Pombal, Haddad & Cruz, 2003)
- Trachycephalus mesophaeus (Hensel, 1867)
- Trachycephalus nigromaculatus Tschudi, 1838
- Trachycephalus resinifictrix (Goeldi, 1907)
- Trachycephalus venulosus (Laurenti, 1768)
- Xenohyla eugenioi Caramaschi, 1998
- Xenohyla truncata (Izecksohn, 1959)

=== Hylodidae ===
- Crossodactylus aeneus Müller, 1924
- Crossodactylus bokermanni Caramaschi & Sazima, 1985
- Crossodactylus caramaschii Bastos & Pombal, 1995
- Crossodactylus cyclospinus Nascimento, Cruz & Feio, 2005
- Crossodactylus dantei Carcerelli & Caramaschi, 1993 "1992
- Crossodactylus dispar A. Lutz, 1925
- Crossodactylus gaudichaudii Duméril & Bibron, 1841
- Crossodactylus grandis B. Lutz, 1951
- Crossodactylus lutzorum Carcerelli & Caramaschi, 1993 "1992"
- Crossodactylus schmidti Gallardo, 1961
- Crossodactylus trachystomus (Reinhardt & Lütken, 1862 "1861")
- Hylodes amnicola Pombal, Feio & Haddad, 2002
- Hylodes asper (Müller, 1924)
- Hylodes babax Heyer, 1982
- Hylodes charadranaetes Heyer & Cocroft, 1986
- Hylodes dactylocinus Pavan, Narvaes & Rodrigues, 2001
- Hylodes fredi Canedo & Pombal, 2007
- Hylodes glaber (Miranda-Ribeiro, 1926)
- Hylodes heyeri Haddad, Pombal & Bastos, 1996
- Hylodes lateristrigatus (Baumann, 1912)
- Hylodes magalhaesi (Bokermann, 1964)
- Hylodes meridionalis (Mertens, 1927)
- Hylodes mertensi (Bokermann, 1956)
- Hylodes nasus (Lichtenstein, 1823)
- Hylodes ornatus (Bokermann, 1967)
- Hylodes otavioi Sazima & Bokermann, 1983 "1982"
- Hylodes perplicatus (Miranda-Ribeiro, 1926)
- Hylodes phyllodes Heyer & Cocroft, 1986
- Hylodes pipilans Canedo & Pombal, 2007
- Hylodes regius Gouvêa, 1979
- Hylodes sazima Haddad & Pombal, 1995
- Hylodes uai Nascimento, Pombal & Haddad, 2001
- Hylodes vanzolinii Heyer, 1982
- Megaelosia apuana Pombal, Prado & Canedo, 2003
- Megaelosia bocainensis Giaretta, Bokermann & Haddad, 1993
- Megaelosia boticariana Giaretta & Aguiar, 1998
- Megaelosia goeldii (Baumann, 1912)
- Megaelosia lutzae Izecksohn & Gouvêa, 1985
- Megaelosia massarti (Witte, 1930)

=== Leiuperidae ===
- Edalorhina perezi Jiménez de la Espada, 1871 "1870"
- Engystomops petersi Jiménez de la Espada, 1872
- Eupemphix nattereri Steindachner, 1863
- Physalaemus aguirrei Bokermann, 1966
- Physalaemus albifrons (Spix, 1824)
- Physalaemus albonotatus (Steindachner, 1864)
- Physalaemus angrensis Weber, Gonzaga & Carvalho-e-Silva, 2005
- Physalaemus atlanticus Haddad & Sazima, 2004
- Physalaemus barrioi Bokermann, 1967
- Physalaemus biligonigerus (Cope, 1861 "1860")
- Physalaemus bokermanni Cardoso & Haddad, 1985
- Physalaemus caete Pombal & Madureira, 1997
- Physalaemus camacan Pimenta, Cruz & Silvano, 2005
- Physalaemus centralis Bokermann, 1962
- Physalaemus cicada Bokermann, 1966
- Physalaemus crombiei Heyer & Wolf, 1989
- Physalaemus cuvieri Fitzinger, 1826
- Physalaemus deimaticus Sazima & Caramaschi, 1988 "1986"
- Physalaemus ephippifer (Steindachner, 1864)
- Physalaemus erikae Cruz & Pimenta, 2004
- Physalaemus erythros Caramaschi, Feio & Guimarães-Neto, 2003
- Physalaemus evangelistai Bokermann, 1967
- Physalaemus gracilis (Boulenger, 1883)
- Physalaemus henselii (Peters, 1872)
- Physalaemus irroratus Cruz, Nascimento & Feio, 2007
- Physalaemus jordanensis Bokermann, 1967
- Physalaemus kroyeri (Reinhardt & Lütken, 1862 "1861")
- Physalaemus lisei Braun & Braun, 1977
- Physalaemus maculiventris (Lutz, 1925)
- Physalaemus marmoratus (Reinhardt & Lütken, 1862 "1861")
- Physalaemus maximus Feio, Pombal, & Caramaschi, 1999
- Physalaemus moreirae (Miranda-Ribeiro, 1937)
- Physalaemus nanus (Boulenger, 1888)
- Physalaemus obtectus Bokermann, 1966
- Physalaemus olfersii (Lichtenstein & Martens, 1856)
- Physalaemus riograndensis Milstead, 1960
- Physalaemus rupestris Caramaschi, Carcerelli, & Feio, 1991
- Physalaemus signifer (Girard, 1853)
- Physalaemus soaresi Izecksohn, 1965
- Physalaemus spiniger (Miranda-Ribeiro, 1926)
- Pleurodema bibroni Tschudi, 1838
- Pleurodema brachyops (Cope, 1869 "1868")
- Pleurodema diplolister (Peters, 1870)
- Pleurodema fuscomaculata (Steindachner, 1864)
- Pseudopaludicola boliviana Parker, 1927
- Pseudopaludicola canga Giaretta & Kokubum, 2003
- Pseudopaludicola ceratophryes Rivero & Serna, 1984
- Pseudopaludicola falcipes (Hensel, 1867)
- Pseudopaludicola mineira Lobo, 1994
- Pseudopaludicola mystacalis (Cope, 1887)
- Pseudopaludicola riopiedadensis Mercadal de Barrio & Barrio, 1994
- Pseudopaludicola saltica (Cope, 1887)
- Pseudopaludicola ternetzi Miranda-Ribeiro, 1937

=== Leptodactylidae ===
- Adenomera nana (Müller, 1922)
- Hydrolaetare dantasi (Bokermann, 1959)
- Hydrolaetare schmidti (Cochran & Goin, 1959)
- Leptodactylus andreae Müller, 1923
- Leptodactylus araucarius (Kwet & Angulo, 2003)
- Leptodactylus bokermanni Heyer, 1973
- Leptodactylus bolivianus Boulenger, 1898
- Leptodactylus bufonius Boulenger, 1894
- Leptodactylus caatingae Heyer & Juncá, 2003
- Leptodactylus camaquara Sazima & Bokermann, 1978
- Leptodactylus chaquensis Cei, 1950
- Leptodactylus cunicularius Sazima & Bokermann, 1978
- Leptodactylus didymus Heyer, García-Lopez & Cardoso, 1996
- Leptodactylus diedrus Heyer, 1994
- Leptodactylus diptyx Boettger, 1885
- Leptodactylus discodactylus Boulenger, 1884 "1883"
- Leptodactylus elenae Heyer, 1978
- Leptodactylus flavopictus Lutz, 1926
- Leptodactylus furnarius Sazima & Bokermann, 1978
- Leptodactylus fuscus (Schneider, 1799)
- Leptodactylus gracilis (Duméril & Bibron, 1841)
- Leptodactylus hylaedactylus (Cope, 1868)
- Leptodactylus hylodes (Reinhardt & Lütken, 1862 "1861")
- Leptodactylus jolyi Sazima & Bokermann, 1978
- Leptodactylus knudseni Heyer, 1972
- Leptodactylus labyrinthicus (Spix, 1824)
- Leptodactylus latinasus Jiménez de la Espada, 1875
- Leptodactylus lauramiriamae Heyer and Crombie, 2005
- Leptodactylus leptodactyloides (Andersson, 1945)
- Leptodactylus lineatus (Schneider, 1799)
- Leptodactylus longirostris Boulenger, 1882
- Leptodactylus macrosternum Miranda-Ribeiro, 1926
- Leptodactylus marambaiae Izecksohn, 1976
- Leptodactylus marmoratus (Steindachner, 1867)
- Leptodactylus martinezi (Bokermann, 1956)
- Leptodactylus myersi Heyer, 1995
- Leptodactylus mystaceus (Spix, 1824)
- Leptodactylus mystacinus (Burmeister, 1861)
- Leptodactylus natalensis A. Lutz, 1930
- Leptodactylus notoaktites Heyer, 1978
- Leptodactylus ocellatus (Linnaeus, 1758)
- Leptodactylus paraensis Heyer, 2005
- Leptodactylus pentadactylus (Laurenti, 1768)
- Leptodactylus petersii (Steindachner, 1864)
- Leptodactylus plaumanni Ahl, 1936
- Leptodactylus podicipinus (Cope, 1862)
- Leptodactylus pustulatus (Peters, 1870)
- Leptodactylus rhodomystax Boulenger, 1884 "1883"
- Leptodactylus rhodonotus (Günther, 1869 "1868")
- Leptodactylus riveroi Heyer & Pyburn, 1983
- Leptodactylus rugosus Noble, 1923
- Leptodactylus sabanensis Heyer, 1994
- Leptodactylus sertanejo Giaretta & Costa, 2007
- Leptodactylus spixi Heyer, 1983
- Leptodactylus stenodema Jiménez de la Espada, 1875
- Leptodactylus syphax Bokermann, 1969
- Leptodactylus tapiti Sazima & Bokermann, 1978
- Leptodactylus thomei Almeida & Angulo 2006
- Leptodactylus troglodytes A. Lutz, 1926
- Leptodactylus validus Garman, 1888
- Leptodactylus vastus A. Lutz, 1930
- Leptodactylus viridis Jim & Spirandeli-Cruz, 1973
- Leptodactylus wagneri (Peters, 1862)
- Paratelmatobius cardosoi Pombal & Haddad, 1999
- Paratelmatobius gaigeae (Cochran, 1938)
- Paratelmatobius lutzii Lutz & Carvalho, 1958
- Paratelmatobius mantiqueira Pombal & Haddad, 1999
- Paratelmatobius poecilogaster Giaretta & Castanho, 1990
- Scythrophrys sawayae (Cochran, 1953)

=== Microhylidae ===
- Arcovomer passarellii Carvalho, 1954
- Chiasmocleis alagoanus Cruz, Caramaschi & Freire, 1999
- Chiasmocleis albopunctata (Boettger, 1885)
- Chiasmocleis atlantica Cruz, Caramaschi & Izecksohn, 1997
- Chiasmocleis bassleri Dunn, 1949
- Chiasmocleis capixaba Cruz, Caramaschi & Izecksohn, 1997
- Chiasmocleis carvalhoi Cruz, Caramaschi & Izecksohn, 1997
- Chiasmocleis centralis Bokermann, 1952
- Chiasmocleis cordeiroi Caramaschi & Pimenta, 2003
- Chiasmocleis crucis Caramaschi & Pimenta, 2003
- Chiasmocleis gnoma Canedo, Dixo & Pombal, 2004
- Chiasmocleis hudsoni Parker, 1940
- Chiasmocleis jimi Caramaschi & Cruz, 2001
- Chiasmocleis leucosticta (Boulenger, 1888)
- Chiasmocleis mehelyi Caramaschi & Cruz, 1997
- Chiasmocleis sapiranga Cruz, Caramaschi & Napoli, 2007
- Chiasmocleis schubarti Bokermann, 1952
- Chiasmocleis shudikarensis Dunn, 1949
- Chiasmocleis ventrimaculata (Andersson, 1945)
- Ctenophryne geayi Mocquard, 1904
- Dasypops schirchi Miranda-Ribeiro, 1924
- Dermatonotus muelleri (Boettger, 1885)
- Elachistocleis bicolor (Valenciennes in Guérin-Menéville, 1838)
- Elachistocleis erythrogaster Kwet & Di-Bernardo, 1998
- Elachistocleis ovalis (Schneider, 1799)
- Elachistocleis piauiensis Caramaschi & Jim, 1983
- Hamptophryne boliviana (Parker, 1927)
- Hyophryne histrio Carvalho, 1954
- Myersiella microps (Duméril & Bibron, 1841)
- Otophryne pyburni Campbell & Clarke, 1998
- Stereocyclops incrassatus Cope, 1870 "1869"
- Stereocyclops parkeri (Wettstein, 1934)
- Synapturanus mirandaribeiroi Nelson & Lescure, 1975
- Synapturanus salseri Pyburn, 1975
- Syncope tridactyla (Duellman & Medelson, 1995)

=== Pipidae ===
- Pipa arrabali Izecksohn, 1976
- Pipa aspera Müller, 1924
- Pipa carvalhoi (Miranda-Ribeiro, 1937)
- Pipa pipa (Linnaeus, 1758)
- Pipa snethlageae Müller, 1914

=== Ranidae ===
- Rana catesbeiana Shaw, 1802 introduced
- Rana palmipes Spix, 1824

== Caudata ==
=== Plethodontidae ===
- Bolitoglossa paraensis (Unterstein, 1930)

== Gymnophiona ==
=== Caeciliidae ===
- Atretochoana eiselti (Taylor, 1968)
- Brasilotyphlus braziliensis (Dunn, 1945)
- Caecilia armata Dunn, 1942
- Caecilia gracilis Shaw, 1802
- Caecilia tentaculata Linnaeus, 1758
- Chthonerpeton arii Cascon & Lima-Verde, 1994
- Chthonerpeton braestrupi Taylor, 1968
- Chthonerpeton exile Nussbaum & Wilkinson, 1987
- Chthonerpeton indistinctum (Reinhardt & Lütken, 1862 "1861")
- Chthonerpeton noctinectes da Silva, Britto-Pereira & Caramaschi, 2003
- Chthonerpeton perissodus Nussbaum & Wilkinson 1987
- Chthonerpeton viviparum Parker & Wettstein, 1929
- Luetkenotyphlus brasiliensis (Lütken, 1852 "1851")
- Microcaecilia supernumeraria Taylor, 1969
- Mimosiphonops reinhardti Wilkinson & Nussbaum, 1992
- Mimosiphonops vermiculatus Taylor, 1968
- Nectocaecilia petersii (Boulenger, 1882)
- Oscaecilia hypereumeces Taylor, 1968
- Potamotyphlus kaupii (Berthold, 1859)
- Siphonops annulatus (Mikan, 1820)
- Siphonops hardyi Boulenger, 1888
- Siphonops insulanus Ihering, 1911
- Siphonops leucoderus Taylor, 1968
- Siphonops paulensis Boettger, 1892
- Typhlonectes compressicauda (Duméril & Bibron, 1841)
- Typhlonectes cunhai Cascon, Lima-Verde & Marques, 1991

=== Rhinatrematidae ===
- Rhinatrema bivittatum (Cuvier in Guérin-Méneville, 1829)

== See also ==
- Wildlife of Brazil
- List of Brazilian birds
- List of Brazilian mammals
- List of Brazilian reptiles
- List of regional amphibians lists
