= P. carvalhoi =

P. carvalhoi may refer to:

- Pipa carvalhoi, the Carvalho's Surinam toad, a frog species endemic to Brazil
- Pristimantis carvalhoi, B. Lutz in B. Lutz & Kloss, 1952, an amphibian species in the genus Pristimantis found in Brazil

== See also ==
- Carvalhoi (disambiguation)
