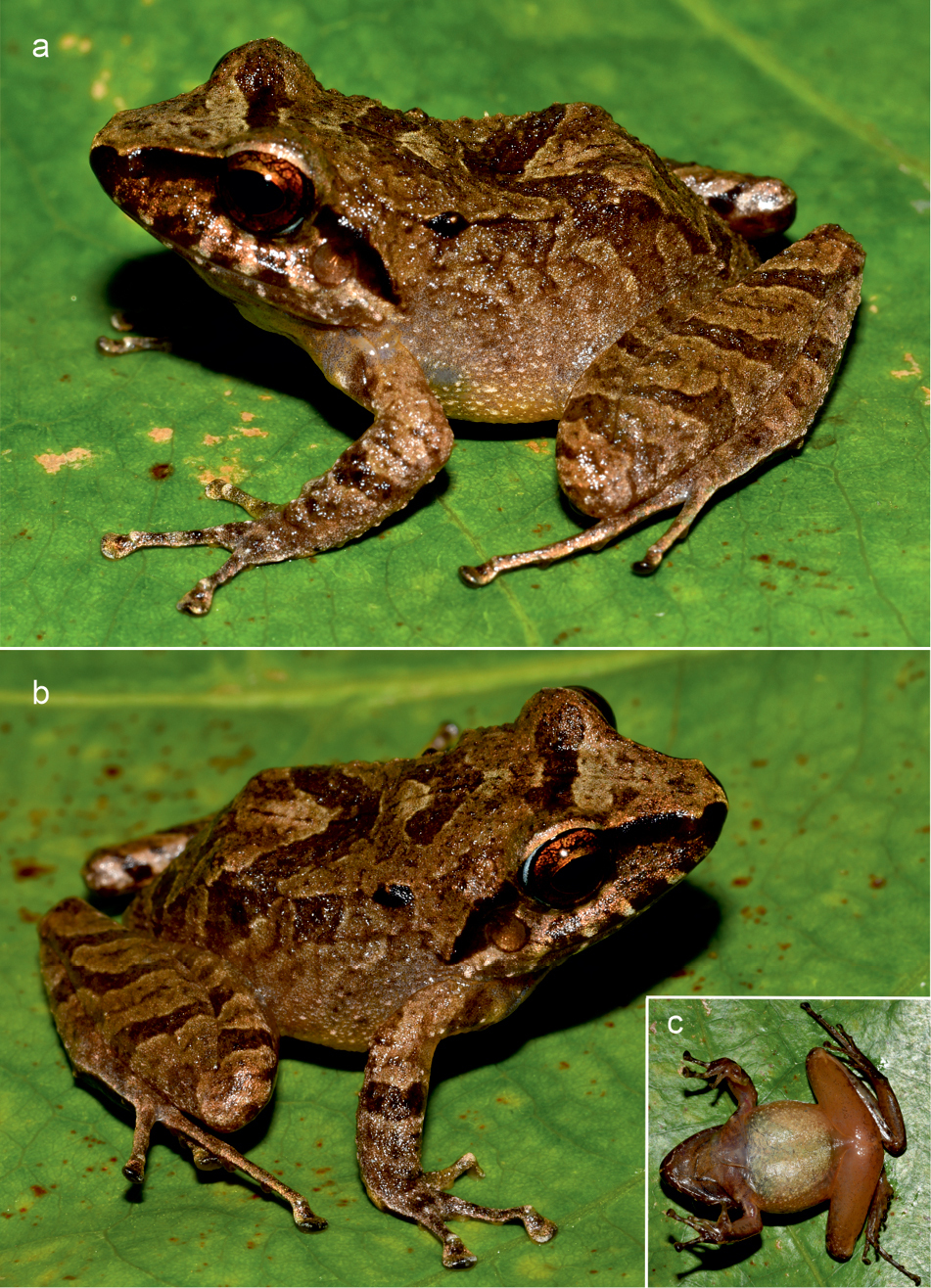
- Male holotype of Pristimantis symptosus

Scientific classification
- Kingdom: Animalia
- Phylum: Chordata
- Class: Amphibia
- Order: Anura
- Family: Strabomantidae
- Genus: Pristimantis
- Species: P. symptosus

Binomial name
- Pristimantis symptosus Köhler, Castillo-Urbina, Aguilar-Puntriano, Vences, and Glaw, 2022
- Pristimantis symptosus is only known from the Cordillera de Carpish in Peru

= Pristimantis symptosus =

Species of frog

Pristimantis symptosus is a species of frog in the family Strabomantidae. It belongs to the Pristimantis conspicillatus species group. It is endemic to Peru and only known from the vicinity of its type locality in the Cordillera de Carpish, Huánuco Region.

Pristimantis symptosus was described based on a single specimen that was collected by coincidence when the collection party returned to the type locality to pick up some gear they had accidentally left behind. Hence the specific name symptosus, derived from the Greek symptosi meaning "coincidence".

== Description ==
The holotype is an adult male measuring 27.6 mm (1.1 in) in snout–vent length. The head is longer than it is wide. The snout is subacuminate in dorsal view and bluntly rounded in profile. The tympanum is distinct and the supra-tympanic fold is long and prominent. The fingers and the toes are long and slender with enlarged tips. No webbing is present between the fingers whereas the toes have weak lateral fringes and traces of basal webbing. Dorsal ground color is brown to tan. There are dark brown chevrons and irregular dark brown blotches on the dorsum. The arms and legs have dark brown bars on their dorsal surfaces. There is a dark brown inter-orbital bar, a pair of black spots surrounding prominent scapular warts, a broad black supra-tympanic stripe, and a broad blackish canthal stripe. The flanks are brown with irregular dark brown markings. The belly is cream. The throat and chest are orange-brown with dense black mottling. The iris is copper with black reticulation and pale blue posterior periphery.

== Habitat and conservation ==
Pristimantis symptosus was found on a leaf about 25 cm above the ground during a foggy night with light rain. The locality is a steep slope at 2,360 m (7,740 ft) above sea level where upper montane rainforest is transitioning to cloud forest. Other males likely representing the same species were heard in the same place, but fell silent when approached. The ecology of this species is otherwise unknown.

As of late 2023, this species has not been assessed for the IUCN Red List of Threatened Species.
