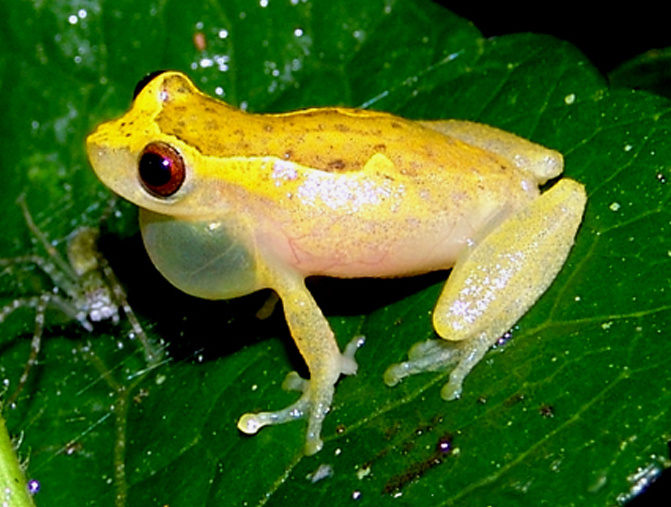

Conservation status
- Least Concern (IUCN 3.1)

Scientific classification
- Kingdom: Animalia
- Phylum: Chordata
- Class: Amphibia
- Order: Anura
- Family: Hylidae
- Genus: Dendropsophus
- Species: D. decipiens

Binomial name
- Dendropsophus decipiens (A. Lutz, 1925)

Synonyms
- Hyla decipiens Lutz, 1925

= Dendropsophus decipiens =

Species of frog

Dendropsophus decipiens is a species of frog in the family Hylidae. It is endemic to eastern Brazil between the Pernambuco and Rio de Janeiro states, or following IUCN, between the Maranhão and São Paulo states. It is also known as Brazilian coastal treefrog.

Dendropsophus decipiens is a very common species occurring in a wide range of habitats, such as open areas (pastures, grassland, and savanna), primary and secondary forests, and coastal restinga scrubland, at elevations up to 1,000 m (3,300 ft) above sea level. Typically, it is found on vegetation near water. The eggs are laid on tree leaves above bodies of water (both temporary and permanent); the tadpoles fall into the water where they continue to develop. It is a very adaptable species that does not face any known threats and that occurs in many protected areas.
