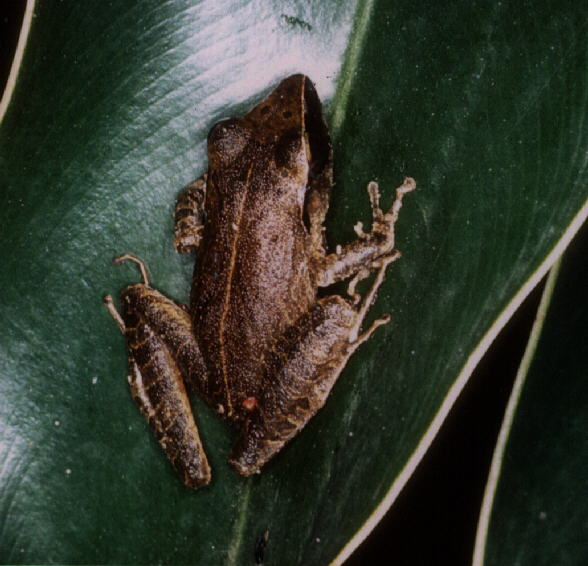

Conservation status
- Least Concern (IUCN 3.1)

Scientific classification
- Kingdom: Animalia
- Phylum: Chordata
- Class: Amphibia
- Order: Anura
- Clade: Brachycephaloidea
- Family: Craugastoridae
- Genus: Pristimantis
- Species: P. gutturalis

Binomial name
- Pristimantis gutturalis (Hoogmoed, Lynch & Lescure, 1977)

Synonyms
- Eleutherodactylus gutturalis Hoogmoed, Lynch, and Lescure, 1977

= Pristimantis gutturalis =

Species of frog

Pristimantis gutturalis is a species of frog in the family Strabomantidae. It is found in Brazil, French Guiana, and Suriname. Its natural habitat is tropical moist lowland forest. It is threatened by habitat loss.
