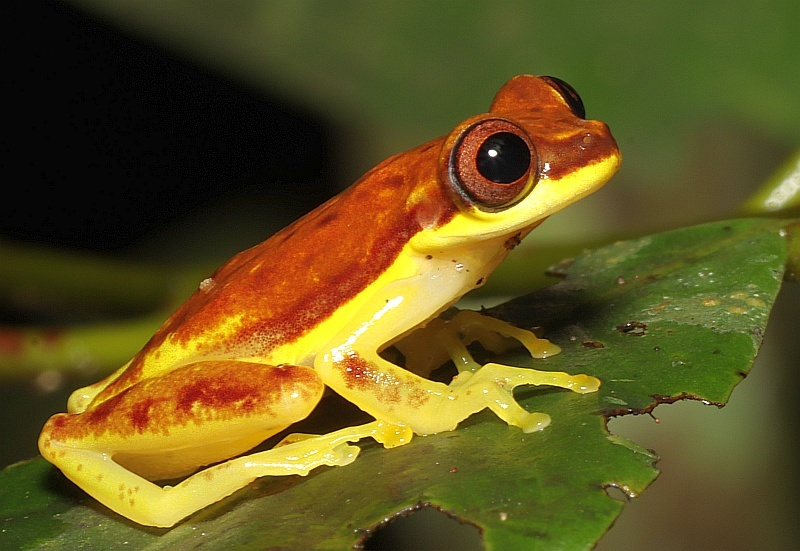

Conservation status
- Least Concern (IUCN 3.1)

Scientific classification
- Kingdom: Animalia
- Phylum: Chordata
- Class: Amphibia
- Order: Anura
- Family: Hylidae
- Genus: Dendropsophus
- Species: D. rhodopeplus

Binomial name
- Dendropsophus rhodopeplus (Günther, 1858)

Synonyms
- Hyla albida (Melin, 1941); Hyla aluminiata (Andersson, 1906); Hyla rufopunctata (Andersson, 1906)

= Dendropsophus rhodopeplus =

Species of frog

Dendropsophus rhodopeplus (common name: red-skirted treefrog) is a species of frog in the family Hylidae. It is found in the upper Amazon Basin in Bolivia, Brazil, Colombia, Ecuador, and Peru.

Dendropsophus rhodopeplus is a very abundant and widespread frog found in primary and secondary tropical rainforest. These frogs gather near permanent and temporary ponds and swamps for breeding.

== Gallery ==
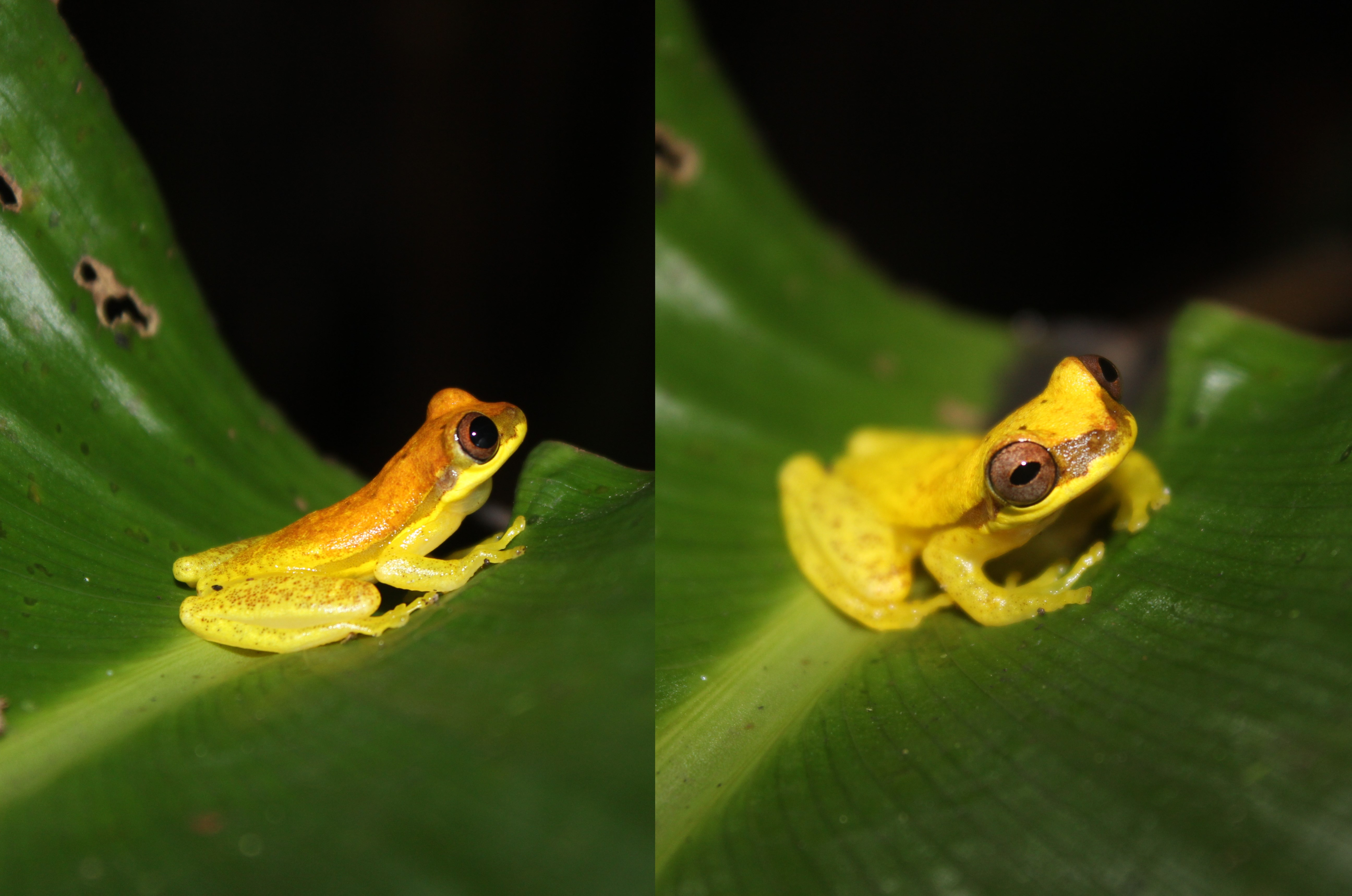
D. rhodopeplus: colour changing after one minute exposure to flashlight.
