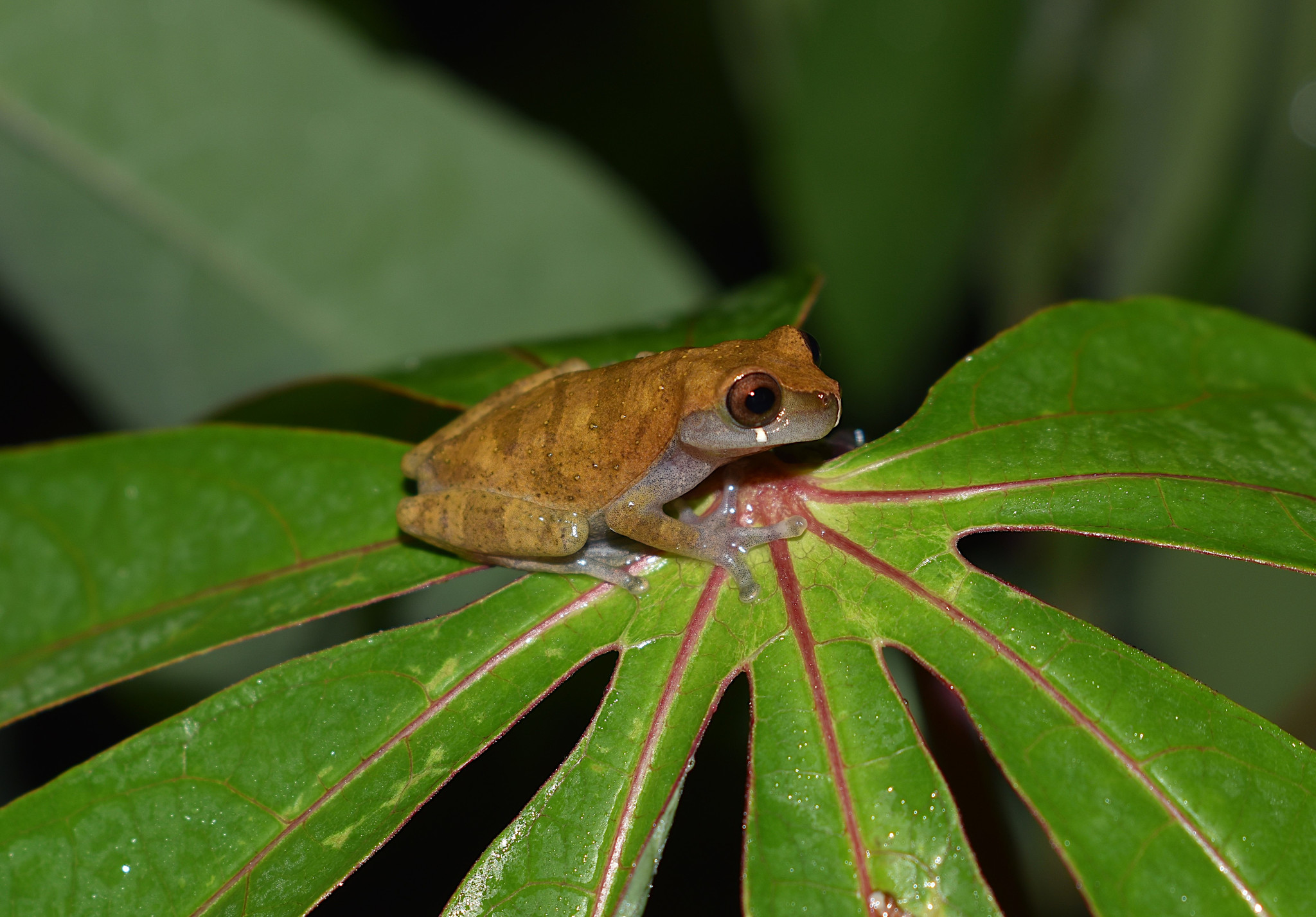

Conservation status
- Least Concern (IUCN 3.1)

Scientific classification
- Kingdom: Animalia
- Phylum: Chordata
- Class: Amphibia
- Order: Anura
- Family: Hylidae
- Genus: Dendropsophus
- Species: D. koechlini

Binomial name
- Dendropsophus koechlini (Duellman & Trueb, 1989)

= Dendropsophus koechlini =

Species of frog

Dendropsophus koechlini is a species of frog in the family Hylidae, known commonly as Koechlin's treefrog. It is found in Bolivia, Brazil, Peru, and possibly Colombia. Its natural habitats are subtropical or tropical moist lowland forests and intermittent freshwater marshes.
