= Ischnocnema spanios =

Conservation status
- Data Deficient (IUCN 3.1)

Scientific classification
- Kingdom: Animalia
- Phylum: Chordata
- Class: Amphibia
- Order: Anura
- Family: Brachycephalidae
- Genus: Ischnocnema
- Species: I. spanios

Binomial name
- Ischnocnema spanios (Heyer, 1985)

Synonyms
- Eleutherodactylus spanios Heyer, 1985

Species of frog

Ischnocnema spanios is a species of frog in the family Brachycephalidae. It is endemic to Brazil. Its natural habitat is tropical moist lowland forest. It is threatened by habitat loss.
