= Pristimantis dundeei =

Conservation status
- Data Deficient (IUCN 3.1)

Scientific classification
- Kingdom: Animalia
- Phylum: Chordata
- Class: Amphibia
- Order: Anura
- Family: Strabomantidae
- Genus: Pristimantis
- Species: P. dundeei

Binomial name
- Pristimantis dundeei (Heyer & Muñoz, 1999)

Synonyms
- Eleutherodactylus dundeei Heyer & Muñoz, 1999

Species of frog

Pristimantis dundeei is a species of frog in the family Strabomantidae. It is found in Bolivia and Brazil near its type locality, Chapada dos Guimarães, Mato Grosso. Its natural habitats are gallery forests in the Cerrado savanna. Its status is insufficiently known.
