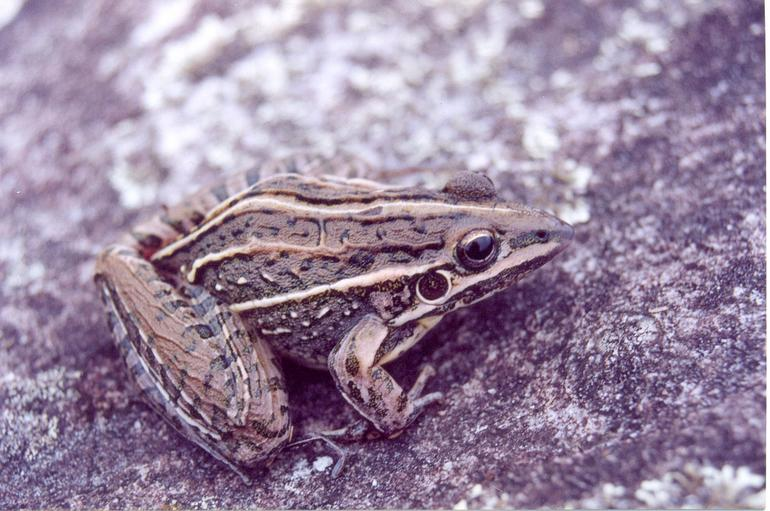

Conservation status
- Least Concern (IUCN 3.1)

Scientific classification
- Kingdom: Animalia
- Phylum: Chordata
- Class: Amphibia
- Order: Anura
- Family: Leptodactylidae
- Genus: Leptodactylus
- Species: L. jolyi

Binomial name
- Leptodactylus jolyi Sazima & Bokermann, 1978

Synonyms
- Leptodactylus sertanejo Giaretta and Costa, 2007

= Leptodactylus jolyi =

Species of frog

Leptodactylus jolyi is a species of frog in the family Leptodactylidae. It is endemic to Brazil.

== Habitat ==
This frog lives in cerrado, caatinga, and Atlantic forest biomes and in grasslands. Scientists have observed the frog between 750 and 900 meters above sea level.

Scientists have resported the frog in some protected places: APA Corumbatai, Botucatu e Tejupa Perimetro Corumbatai, APA da Bacia Hidrografica do Rio do Machado, APA do Rio Sucuriu-Paraiso, APA Sul Rmbh, ESEC de Itirapina, PARES do Itacolomi, PARNA da Serra da Bodoquena, and PARNA da Serra do Cipó.

== Reproduction ==
The female frog lays eggs in temporary ponds.

== Threats ==
The IUCN classifies this species as least concern. In some parts of their range, the frogs are in some danger from habitat loss in favor of cattle grazing and tourism. Climate change can also affect this frog.
