= Calamita melanorabdotus =

Conservation status
- Data Deficient (IUCN 3.1)

Scientific classification
- Kingdom: Animalia
- Phylum: Chordata
- Class: Amphibia
- Order: Anura
- Family: Hylidae
- Subfamily: Hylinae
- Genus: Calamita
- Species: C. melanorabdotus

Binomial name
- Calamita melanorabdotus Schneider, 1799

Synonyms
- Rana Melanorabdata; Hyla melanorabdota

Species of amphibian

Calamita melanorabdotus is a possible species of frog reported from Brazil in 1799. A 19th century treatise considered it to be a junior synonym of Hyla lactea, but it is now considered a nomen dubium.
