= Dendropsophus nahdereri =

Conservation status
- Least Concern (IUCN 3.1)

Scientific classification
- Kingdom: Animalia
- Phylum: Chordata
- Class: Amphibia
- Order: Anura
- Family: Hylidae
- Genus: Dendropsophus
- Species: D. nahdereri

Binomial name
- Dendropsophus nahdereri (B. Lutz & Bokermann, 1963)

Species of frog

The Estrava Seraiva tree frog (Dendropsophus nahdereri) is a species of frog in the family Hylidae. It is endemic to Brazil.

== Habitat ==
This frog lives in secondary forest, clearings, forest edges, pasture, and shrubland. People have seen it in rural gardens. This frog has shown some tolerance to anthropogenic disturbance. Scientists have seen it between 800 and 1,100 m (2,620 and 3,610 ft) above sea level. Scientists have reported it in protected places.

== Reproduction ==
These frogs reproduce in ponds.

== Threats ==
The IUCN classifies this frog as least concern of extinction.
