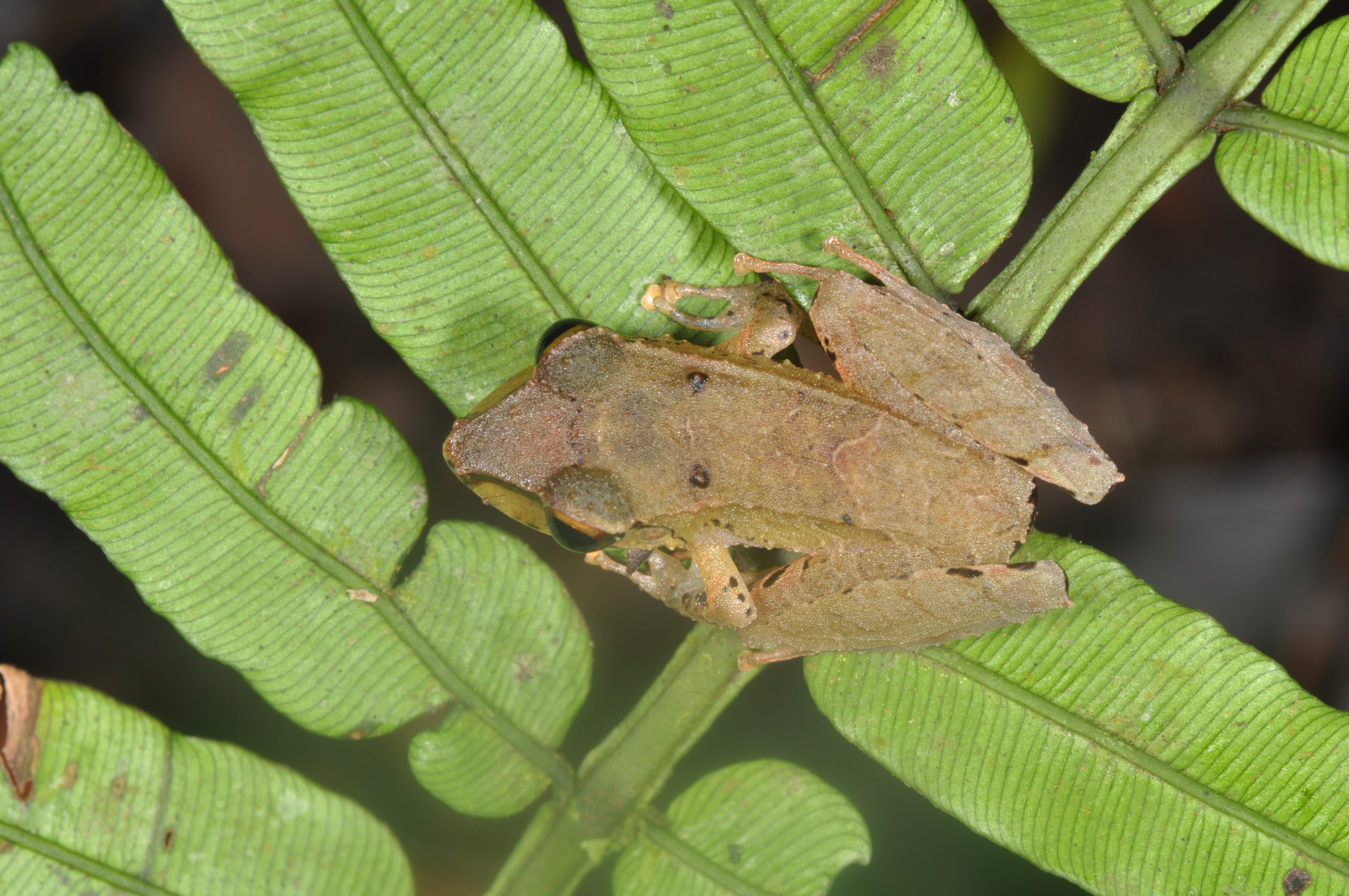

Conservation status
- Least Concern (IUCN 3.1)

Scientific classification
- Kingdom: Animalia
- Phylum: Chordata
- Class: Amphibia
- Order: Anura
- Clade: Brachycephaloidea
- Family: Craugastoridae
- Genus: Pristimantis
- Species: P. lanthanites

Binomial name
- Pristimantis lanthanites (Lynch, 1975)

Synonyms
- Eleutherodactylus lanthanites Lynch, 1975

= Pristimantis lanthanites =

Species of frog

Pristimantis lanthanites is a species of frog in the family Strabomantidae. It is found in Brazil, Colombia, Ecuador, and Peru. Its natural habitats are tropical moist lowland forests and moist montane forests.
