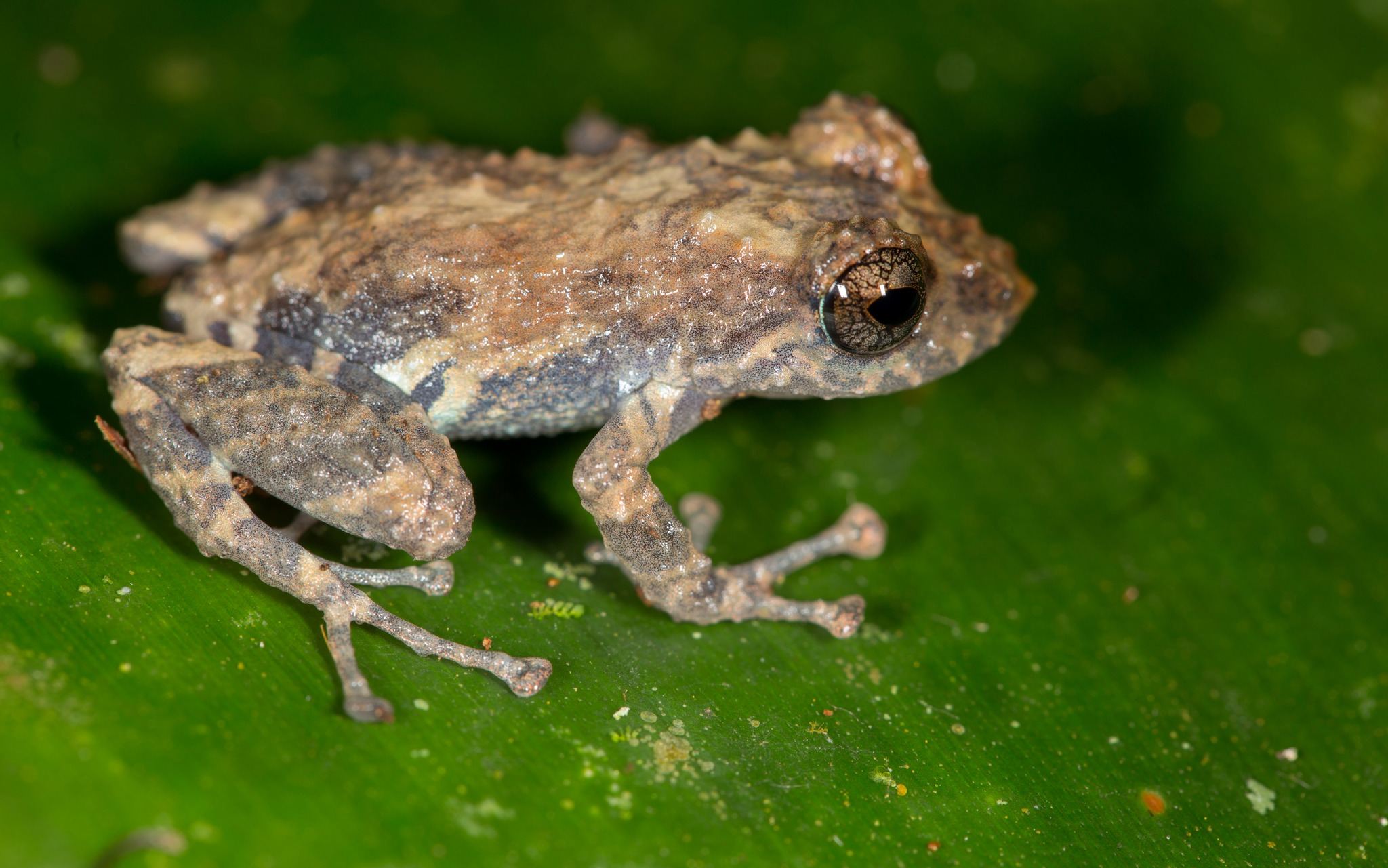

Conservation status
- Least Concern (IUCN 3.1)

Scientific classification
- Kingdom: Animalia
- Phylum: Chordata
- Class: Amphibia
- Order: Anura
- Family: Strabomantidae
- Genus: Pristimantis
- Species: P. diadematus

Binomial name
- Pristimantis diadematus (Jiménez de la Espada, 1875)

Synonyms
- Eleutherodactylus diadematus (Jimenez de la Espada, 1875); Eleutherodactylus bufonius Andersson, 1945

= Pristimantis diadematus =

Species of frog

Pristimantis diadematus is a species of frog in the family Strabomantidae. It is found in Ecuador and Peru, and possibly Brazil as well as Colombia. Its natural habitat is tropical moist lowland forest.
