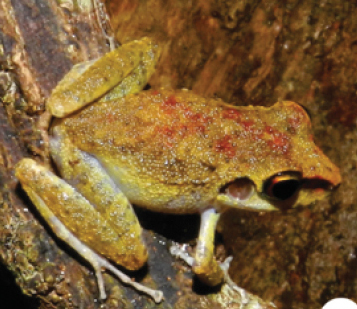

Conservation status
- Least Concern (IUCN 3.1)

Scientific classification
- Kingdom: Animalia
- Phylum: Chordata
- Class: Amphibia
- Order: Anura
- Clade: Brachycephaloidea
- Family: Craugastoridae
- Genus: Pristimantis
- Species: P. zeuctotylus

Binomial name
- Pristimantis zeuctotylus (Lynch & Hoogmoed, 1977)

Synonyms
- Eleutherodactylus zeuctotylus Lynch & Hoogmoed, 1977

= Pristimantis zeuctotylus =

Species of frog

Pristimantis zeuctotylus is a species of frog in the family Strabomantidae. It is found in Brazil, Colombia, French Guiana, Guyana, Suriname, and Venezuela. Its natural habitat is tropical moist lowland forests.

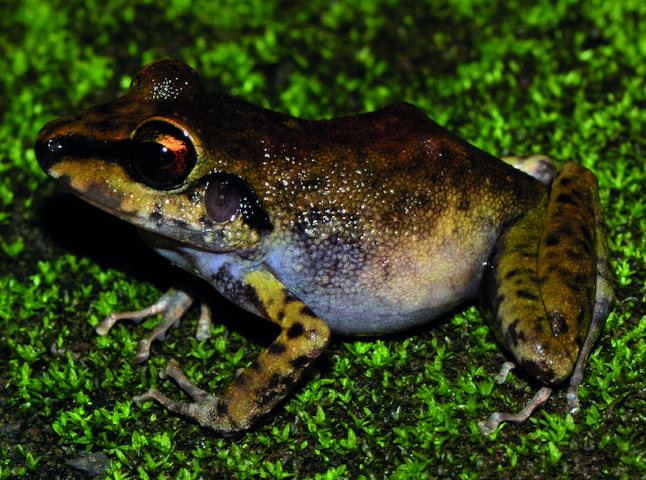
Amapá, Brazil
