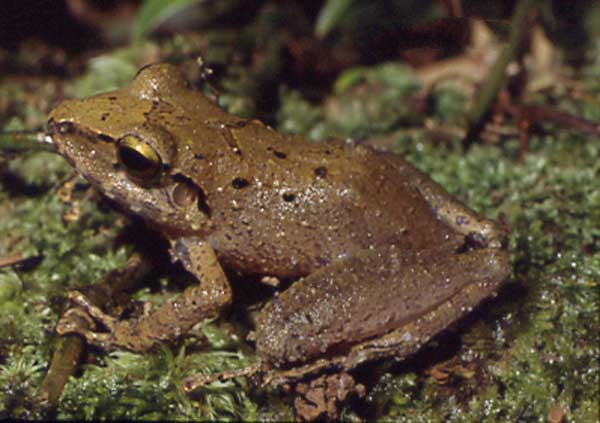

Conservation status
- Least Concern (IUCN 3.1)

Scientific classification
- Kingdom: Animalia
- Phylum: Chordata
- Class: Amphibia
- Order: Anura
- Clade: Brachycephaloidea
- Family: Craugastoridae
- Genus: Pristimantis
- Species: P. fenestratus

Binomial name
- Pristimantis fenestratus (Steindachner, 1864)

Synonyms
- Eleutherodactylus fenestratus (Steindachner, 1864)

= Pristimantis fenestratus =

Rio Mamore robber frog

Species of frog

Pristimantis fenestratus is a species of frog in the family Strabomantidae. It is found in the Amazon Basin of eastern Peru, north-eastern Bolivia, south-eastern Ecuador, south-eastern Colombia, and Brazil. Its common name is Rio Mamore robber frog, after Mamoré River, its type locality. Its natural habitats are tropical humid montane and lowland forests; it can also occur in secondary forest and forest edges. It is very common in parts of its range.
