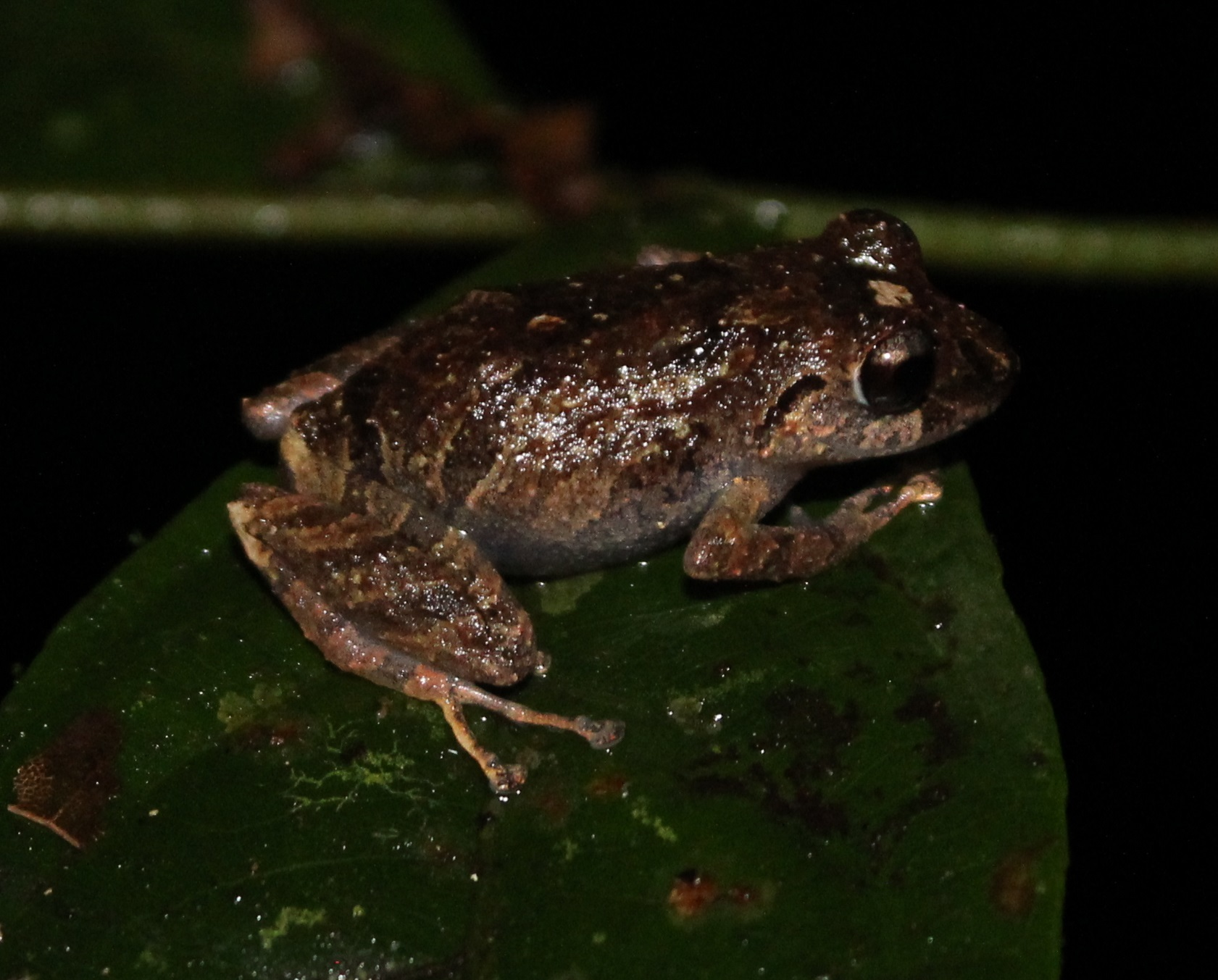
- An adult in Orellana Province, Ecuador.

Conservation status
- Least Concern (IUCN 3.1)

Scientific classification
- Kingdom: Animalia
- Phylum: Chordata
- Class: Amphibia
- Order: Anura
- Clade: Brachycephaloidea
- Family: Craugastoridae
- Genus: Pristimantis
- Species: P. martiae

Binomial name
- Pristimantis martiae (Lynch, 1975)

Synonyms
- Eleutherodactylus martiae Lynch, 1974

= Pristimantis martiae =

Species of frog

Pristimantis martiae is a species of frog in the family Strabomantidae. It is found in Brazil, Colombia, Ecuador, Peru, and possibly Bolivia. Its natural habitats are tropical moist lowland forests and moist montane forests.
