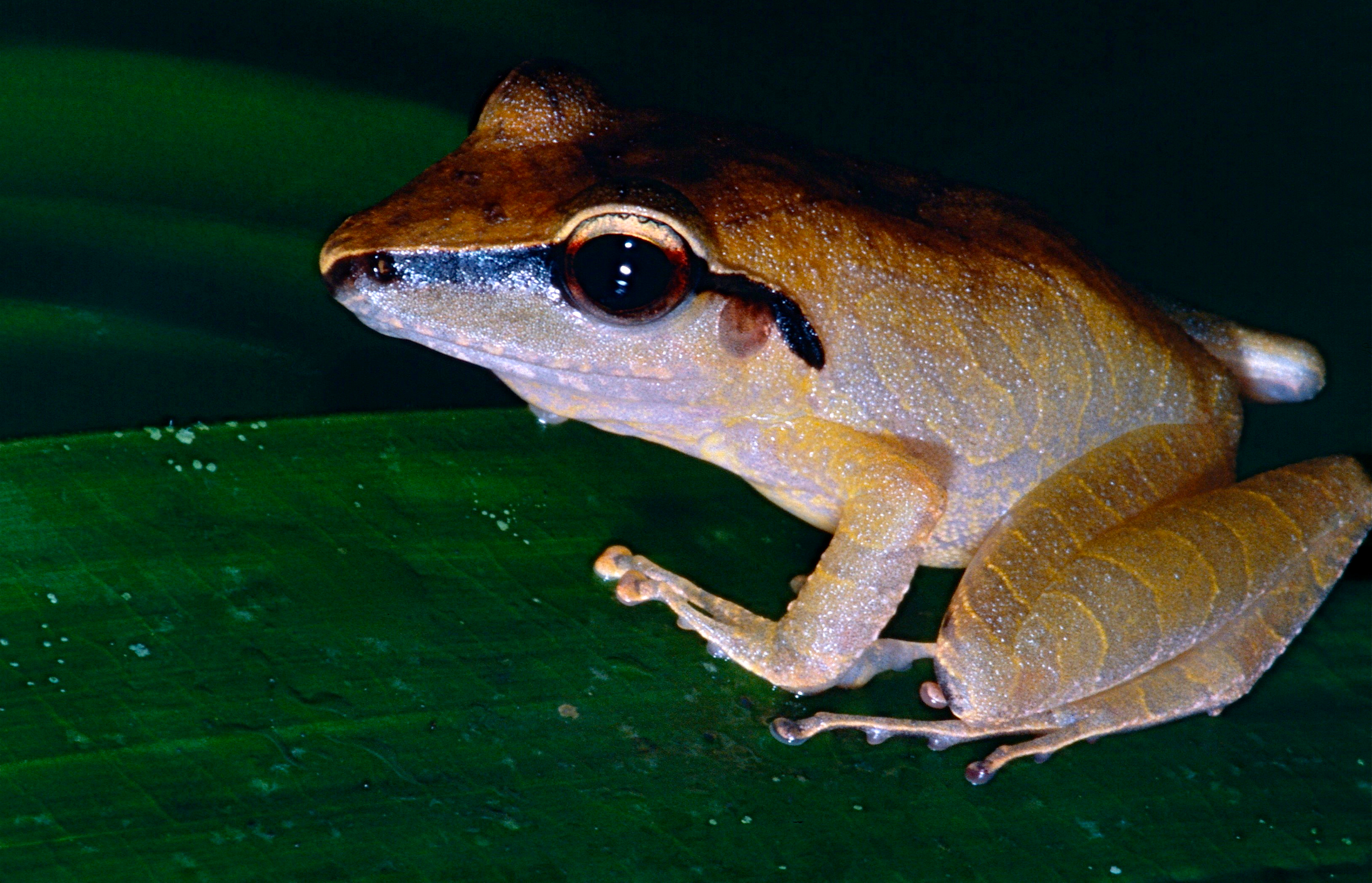

Conservation status
- Least Concern (IUCN 3.1)

Scientific classification
- Kingdom: Animalia
- Phylum: Chordata
- Class: Amphibia
- Order: Anura
- Clade: Brachycephaloidea
- Family: Craugastoridae
- Genus: Pristimantis
- Species: P. chiastonotus

Binomial name
- Pristimantis chiastonotus (Lynch & Hoogmoed, 1977)

Synonyms
- Eleutherodactylus chiastonotus Lynch & Hoogmoed, 1977

= Pristimantis chiastonotus =

Species of frog

Pristimantis chiastonotus is a species of frog in the family Strabomantidae. It is found in Brazil, French Guiana, Suriname, and possibly Guyana. Its natural habitats are tropical moist lowland forests, rural gardens, and heavily degraded former forest. It is threatened by habitat loss.

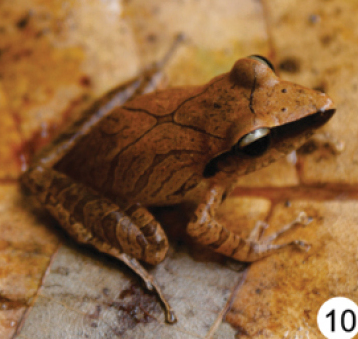
Amapá, Brazil
