= Pristimantis eurydactylus =

Conservation status
- Least Concern (IUCN 3.1)

Scientific classification
- Kingdom: Animalia
- Phylum: Chordata
- Class: Amphibia
- Order: Anura
- Clade: Brachycephaloidea
- Family: Craugastoridae
- Genus: Pristimantis
- Species: P. eurydactylus

Binomial name
- Pristimantis eurydactylus (Hedges & Schluter, 1992)

Synonyms
- Eleutherodactylus eurydactylus Hedges & Schluter, 1992

Species of frog

Pristimantis eurydactylus is a species of frog in the family Strabomantidae. It is found in Brazil and Peru. Its natural habitats are tropical moist lowland forests and montane forests.
