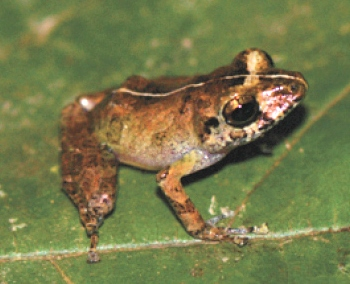

Conservation status
- Least Concern (IUCN 3.1)

Scientific classification
- Kingdom: Animalia
- Phylum: Chordata
- Class: Amphibia
- Order: Anura
- Family: Strabomantidae
- Genus: Pristimantis
- Species: P. marmoratus

Binomial name
- Pristimantis marmoratus (Boulenger, 1900)

Synonyms
- Eleutherodactylus marmoratus (Boulenger, 1900); Eleutherodactylus grandoculis Stejneger, 1904

= Pristimantis marmoratus =

Marbled robber frog

Species of amphibian

Pristimantis marmoratus (marbled robber frog) is a species of frog in the family Strabomantidae. It is found in Brazil, French Guiana, Guyana, Suriname, Venezuela, possibly Colombia, and possibly Peru. Its natural habitats are subtropical or tropical moist lowland forests, subtropical or tropical moist montane forests, plantations, rural gardens, and heavily degraded former forest.
