= Bokermannohyla feioi =

Conservation status
- Data Deficient (IUCN 3.1)

Scientific classification
- Kingdom: Animalia
- Phylum: Chordata
- Class: Amphibia
- Order: Anura
- Family: Hylidae
- Genus: Bokermannohyla
- Species: B. feioi

Binomial name
- Bokermannohyla feioi (Napoli & Caramaschi, 2004)

Species of frog

Bokermannohyla feioi is a species of frog in the Hylidae family. It is endemic to Parque Estadual do Ibitipoca, Brazil. Its natural habitats are subtropical or tropical moist montane forests and rivers. It is threatened by habitat loss for logging, cattle pasture and agriculture including sugar, coffee and exotic trees.

The species had been considered a junior synonym of Bokermannohyla nanuzae, but it has been resurrected as a valid species.
