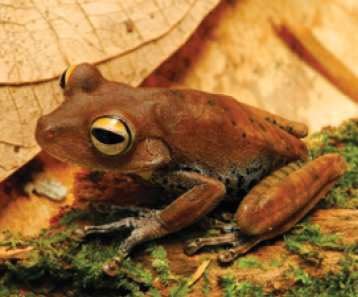

Conservation status
- Least Concern (IUCN 3.1)

Scientific classification
- Kingdom: Animalia
- Phylum: Chordata
- Class: Amphibia
- Order: Anura
- Family: Hylidae
- Genus: Boana
- Species: B. dentei

Binomial name
- Boana dentei (Bokermann, 1967)

Synonyms
- Hyla dentei Bokermann, 1967; Hypsiboas dentei (Bokermann, 1967)

= Amapa tree frog =

Species of amphibian

The Amapa tree frog (Boana dentei) is a species of frog in the family Hylidae found in northern Brazil in the Amapá state (where its type locality, Serra do Navio, is located), French Guiana, and southeastern Suriname. It belongs to the Boana albopunctata species group.

== Description ==
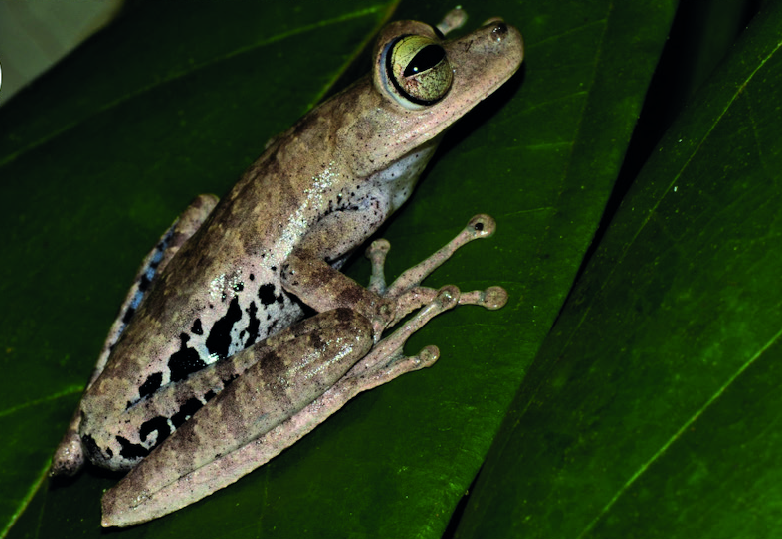
Amapá, Brazil

Boana dentei is a medium-sized tree frog that can grow to 54 mm (2.1 in) snout–vent length. It has large head and eyes. The dorsal colour is variable: brown, brown yellow, dark brown, or brown grey. The flanks and thighs have black spots on white to greyish white background. Ventral surfaces are whitish. The fingers have no webbing but the toes are more than half-webbed.

== Habitat and conservation ==
Natural habitat of Boana dentei is lowland tropical rainforest. They occur in the understorey vegetation and trees. Males call from above ponds and small streams.

This species is facing no major threats; it also occurs in many protected areas.
