= Dendropsophus bokermanni =

Conservation status
- Least Concern (IUCN 3.1)

Scientific classification
- Kingdom: Animalia
- Phylum: Chordata
- Class: Amphibia
- Order: Anura
- Family: Hylidae
- Genus: Dendropsophus
- Species: D. bokermanni

Binomial name
- Dendropsophus bokermanni (Goin, 1960)

Species of frog

Dendropsophus bokermanni is a species of frog in the family Hylidae. It is found in Brazil, Colombia, Ecuador, Peru, and possibly Bolivia. Its natural habitats are subtropical or tropical moist lowland forests, swamps, and intermittent freshwater marshes.
