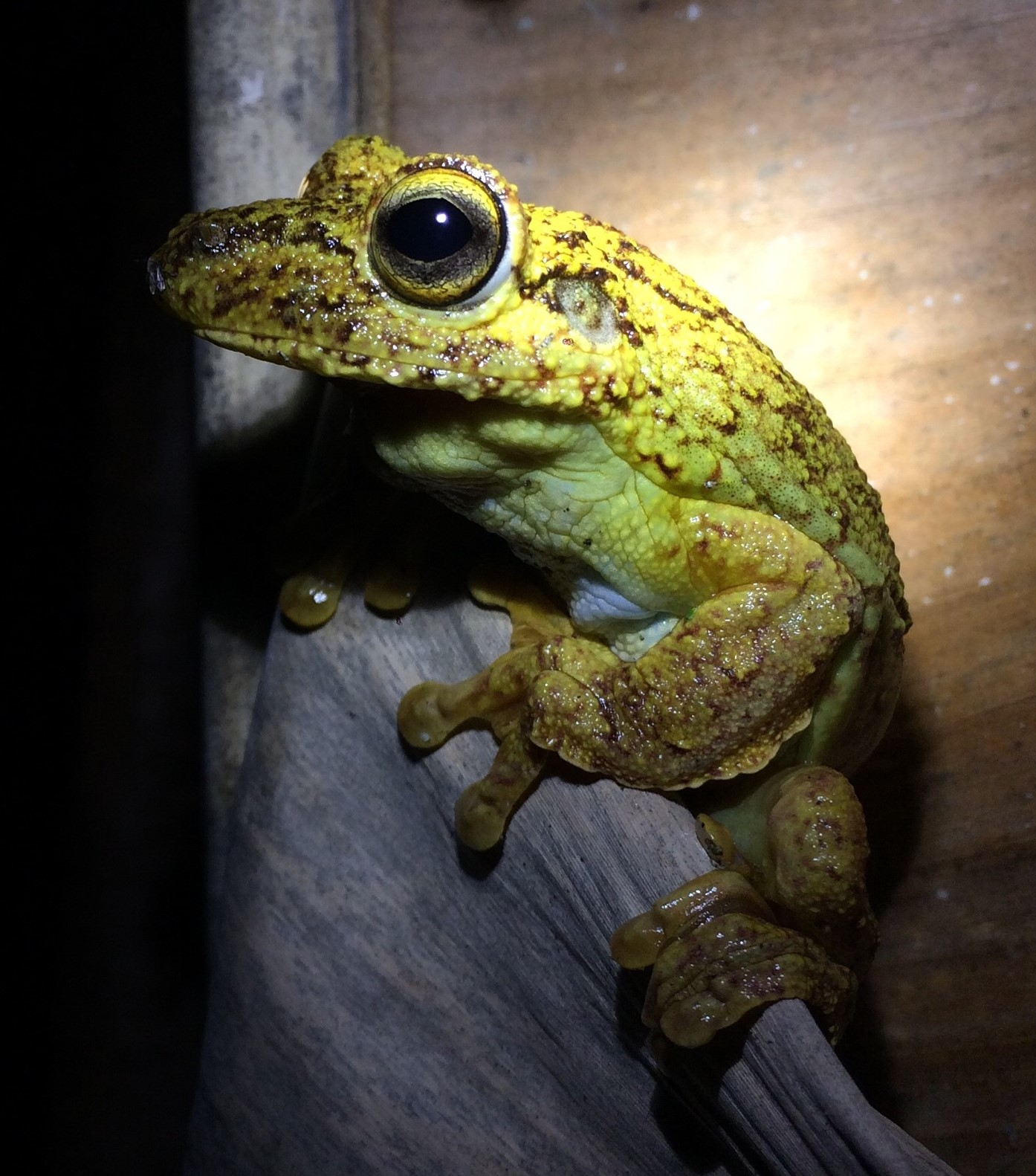

Conservation status
- Least Concern (IUCN 3.1)

Scientific classification
- Kingdom: Animalia
- Phylum: Chordata
- Class: Amphibia
- Order: Anura
- Family: Hylidae
- Genus: Boana
- Species: B. exastis

Binomial name
- Boana exastis (Caramaschi and Rodrigues, 2003)

Synonyms
- Hyla exastis Caramaschi and Rodrigues, 2003; Hypsiboas exastis (Caramaschi and Rodrigues, 2003)

= Boana exastis =

Species of frog

Boana exastis is a species of frog in the family Hylidae. It is endemic to the Northeast Region of Brazil and has been recorded from Bahia, Alagoas, and Pernambuco.

Boana exastis occurs in the Atlantic forest coastal region at elevations of 100–490 m (330–1,610 ft) above sea level. Records have been made in primary forest with large trees and an abundance of epiphytes, adjacent to and in a forest edge, and cocoa plantations adjacent to the forest. Breeding presumably takes place in temporary pools or permanent streams. Minor threats to this species include habitat modification due to urban development and agriculture.
