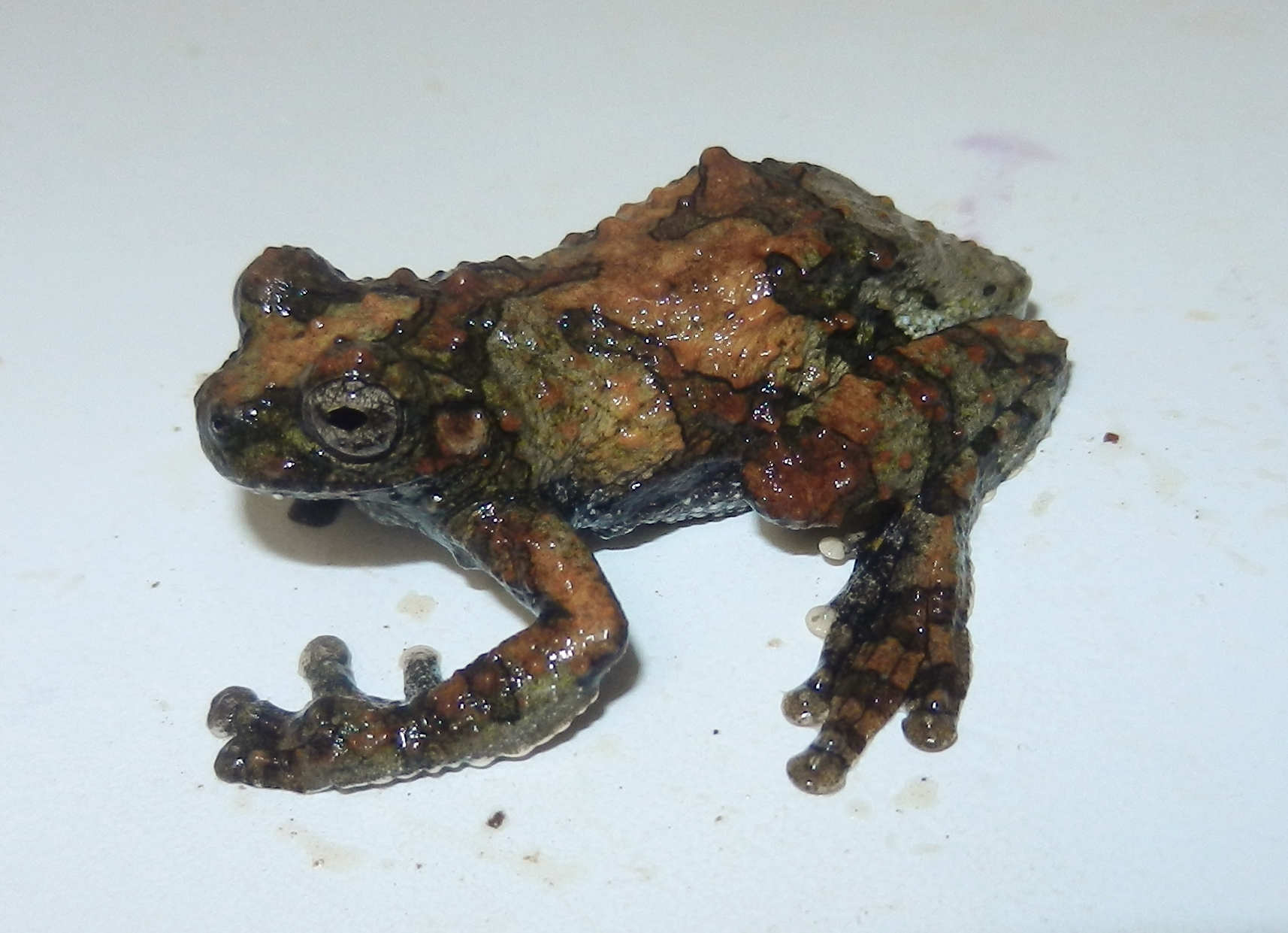

Conservation status
- Least Concern (IUCN 3.1)

Scientific classification
- Kingdom: Animalia
- Phylum: Chordata
- Class: Amphibia
- Order: Anura
- Family: Hylidae
- Genus: Dendropsophus
- Species: D. acreanus

Binomial name
- Dendropsophus acreanus (Bokermann, 1964)

Synonyms
- Hyla acreana Bokermann, 1964

= Dendropsophus acreanus =

Species of frog

Dendropsophus acreanus (common name: Acre treefrog) is a species of frog in the family Hylidae. It is found in western Brazil (in Acre and Amazonas states), northeastern Bolivia, and southeastern Peru.

Dendropsophus acreanus is a common species found in lowland and premontane moist tropical forests. It is an understorey species typically found in forest edges. It can benefit from disturbance, and can spread in vegetation along newly constructed roads. No major threats affecting this species can be identified.

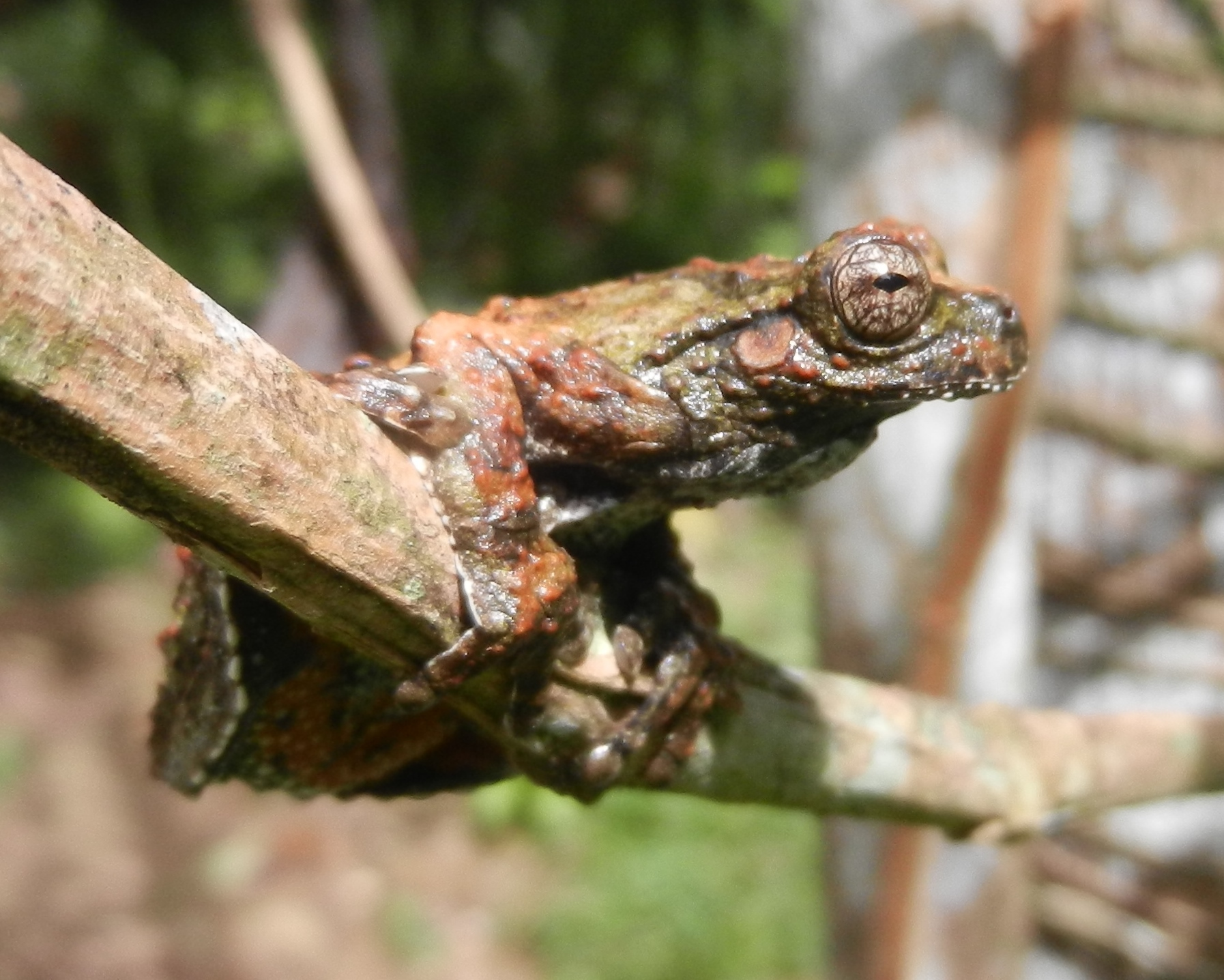
Male Dendropsophus acreanus
