= Dendropsophus meridianus =

Conservation status
- Least Concern (IUCN 3.1)

Scientific classification
- Kingdom: Animalia
- Phylum: Chordata
- Class: Amphibia
- Order: Anura
- Family: Hylidae
- Genus: Dendropsophus
- Species: D. meridianus

Binomial name
- Dendropsophus meridianus (Lutz, 1954)

Synonyms
- Hyla misera meridiana Lutz, 1954; Hyla meridiana Lutz, 1954; Hyla microcephala meridiana Lutz, 1954

Species of frog

Dendropsophus meridianus is a species of frog in the family Hylidae. It is endemic to southeastern Brazil.

== Taxonomy ==
This species was first described as a subspecies of Hyla misera (now a synonym with Hyla microcephala, current name Dendropsophus microcephalus), Hyla misera meridiana, by the Brazilian herpetologist Bertha Lutz in 1954. It was recognized as full species in 1966 by Werner Bokermann, before again being relegated into synonymy with Hyla microcephala by William E. Duellman in 1974. The species status was restored in 2005 by Faivovich and colleagues, who placed Dendropsophus meridianus in their "Dendropsophus microcephalus group", along with 32 other species.

== Description ==
Dendropsophus meridianus are small frogs: males measure 17–20 mm (0.67–0.79 in) and females 20–24 mm (0.79–0.94 in) in snout–vent length. The body is elongate with an angular snout. The dorsum has light orange background with a dark stripe running over the canthus rostralis and disappearing on the sides of the body. There is also a pair of similar, dark lines beginning on the interocular region. The dorsal pattern is occasionally absent or include an additional pair of dark lines over the sacrum, or dark dots and fragments. The underside is immaculate.

== Habitat and conservation ==
This species is found on vegetation near ponds and other standing bodies of water in a range of habitats: forests, open areas, and cities. Breeding takes place in temporary ponds. It is an adaptable and very abundant species that is not threatened, although draining of its breeding sites for human settlement and mosquito control is a threat.
