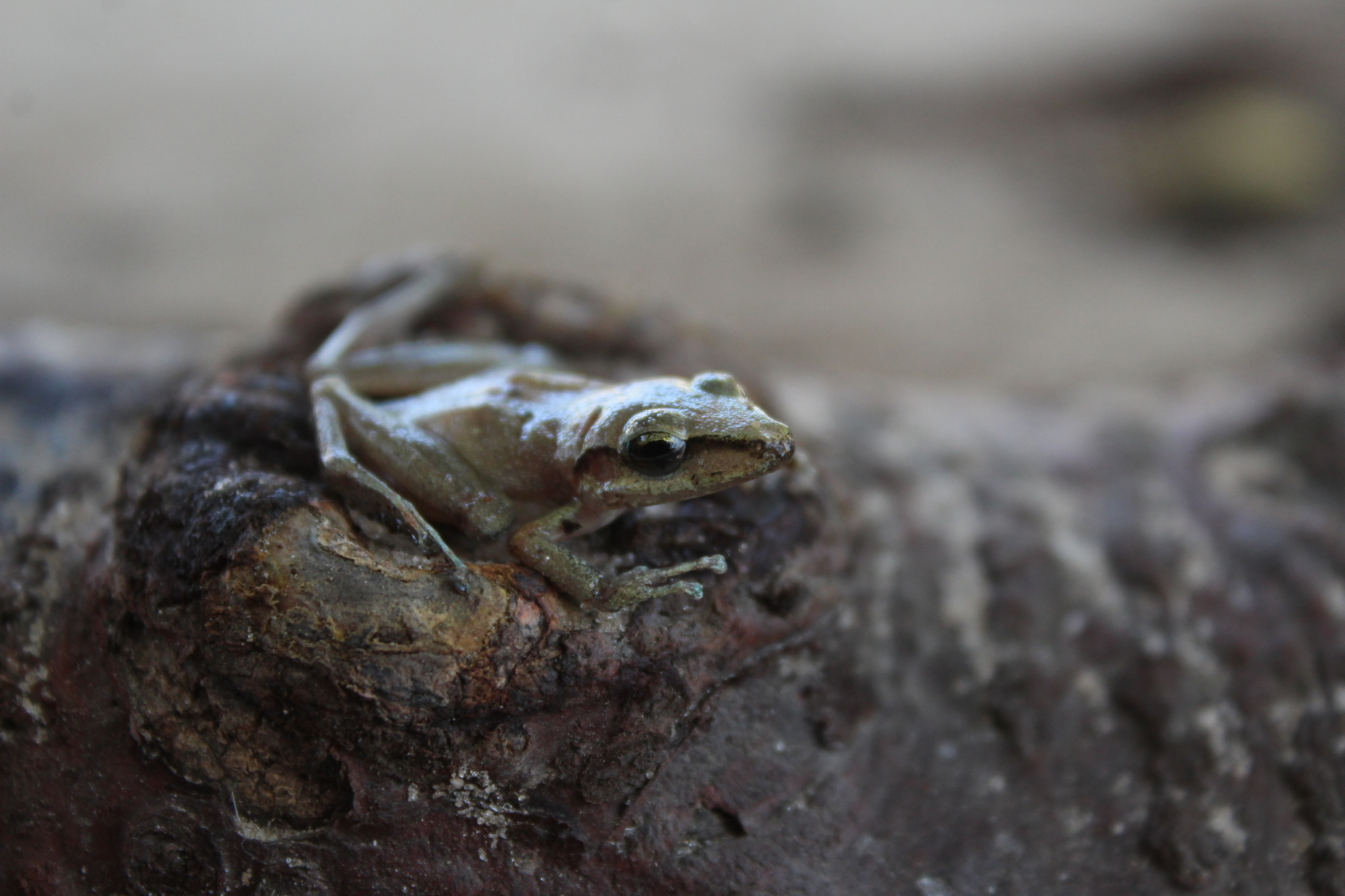
- An adult in Nísia Floresta, Rio Grande do Norte, Brazil.

Conservation status
- Least Concern (IUCN 3.1)

Scientific classification
- Kingdom: Animalia
- Phylum: Chordata
- Class: Amphibia
- Order: Anura
- Family: Strabomantidae
- Genus: Pristimantis
- Species: P. ramagii

Binomial name
- Pristimantis ramagii (Boulenger, 1888)

Synonyms
- Hylodes ramagii Boulenger, 1888; Ischnocnema ramagii (Boulenger, 1888); Eleutherodactylus ramagii (Boulenger, 1888)

= Pristimantis ramagii =

Species of frog

Pristimantis ramagii is a species of frog in the family Strabomantidae. It is endemic to northeastern Brazil and occurs between Paraíba and northern Bahia. Common name Paraiba robber frog has been coined for it. Its natural habitats are primary and secondary forests as well as forest edges and rocky areas. It is usually found in leaf litter or in low vegetation. It is an extremely abundant species that could face threats from habitat loss caused by agriculture, livestock grazing, logging, and human settlement. It occurs in a number of protected areas.
