= Pristimantis lacrimosus =

Conservation status
- Least Concern (IUCN 3.1)

Scientific classification
- Kingdom: Animalia
- Phylum: Chordata
- Class: Amphibia
- Order: Anura
- Family: Strabomantidae
- Genus: Pristimantis
- Species: P. lacrimosus

Binomial name
- Pristimantis lacrimosus (Jiménez de la Espada, 1875)

Synonyms
- Eleutherodactylus lacrimosus (Jiménez de la Espada, 1875)

Species of frog

Pristimantis lacrimosus, commonly known as Jiménez's robber frog or the Lloróna frog, is a species of frog in the family Strabomantidae.

It is found in tropical moist lowland forests in Brazil, Colombia, Ecuador, and Peru.
