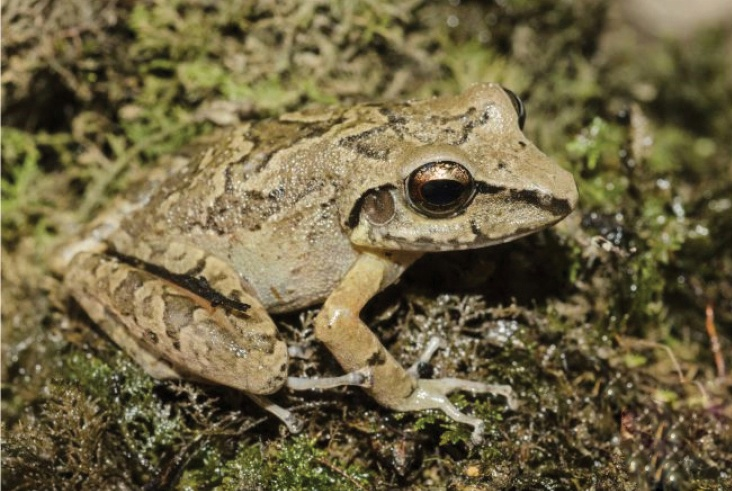

Conservation status
- Least Concern (IUCN 3.1)

Scientific classification
- Kingdom: Animalia
- Phylum: Chordata
- Class: Amphibia
- Order: Anura
- Family: Strabomantidae
- Genus: Pristimantis
- Species: P. vilarsi

Binomial name
- Pristimantis vilarsi (Melin, 1941)

Synonyms
- Hylodes vilarsi Melin, 1941; Hylodes roseus Melin, 1941; Eleutherodactylus vilarsi (Melin, 1941); Eleutherodactylus brachypodius Rivero, 1961; * Eleutherodactylus rosmelinus Gorham, 1966; Eleutherodactylus stegolepis Schlüter and Rödder, 2007 "2006"; Eleutherodactylus conspicillatus ileamazonicus Rivero, 1961; Eleutherodactylus conspicillatus guayanensis Rivero, 1968 "1967"

= Pristimantis vilarsi =

Rio Uaupes robber frog

Species of frog

Pristimantis vilarsi, also known as the Rio Uaupes robber frog, is a species of frog in the family Strabomantidae. It is found in the upper Amazon basin in Brazil, Peru, Colombia, and Venezuela.

== Description ==
Adult males measure 23–33 mm (0.91–1.30 in) and adult females 31–49 mm (1.2–1.9 in) in snout–vent length. Dorsal skin is shagreened and has scattered small warts, but ventral skin smooth. The tympanum is prominent and vertically oval. The snout is subacuminate to acuminate in dorsal view, but round in vertical profile. The canthus rostralis is distinct and angular. Fingers and toes bear discs (enlarged on fingers III and IV and toes IV and V) but have no webbing. Males have vocal slits.

There are three color patterns: (1) dorsum greenish gray, light to dark brown, without pattern or with very small black spots, (2) strongly patterned dorsum with brown to olive background and bearing a "W" mark between the shoulders, as well as diagonal dark brown stripes across the body and limbs, and (3) an intermediate form showing light to dark brown dorsum with indistinct bars, with or without the W between the shoulders, and sometimes with a lichen-like pattern. All forms have dark brown canthal and supratympanic stripes.

== Habitat and conservation ==
Pristimantis vilarsi lives in the leaf litter of lowland rainforests at elevations of 100–1,230 m (330–4,040 ft) above sea level (200–600 m (660–1,970 ft) in Colombia). During the night they can be found on low plants, leaves, rocks, mossy walls, and on the ground. Males call at night. The egg deposition site is unknown. It appears to tolerate some disturbance of its habitat. It is a common species whose range overlaps with several protected areas.
