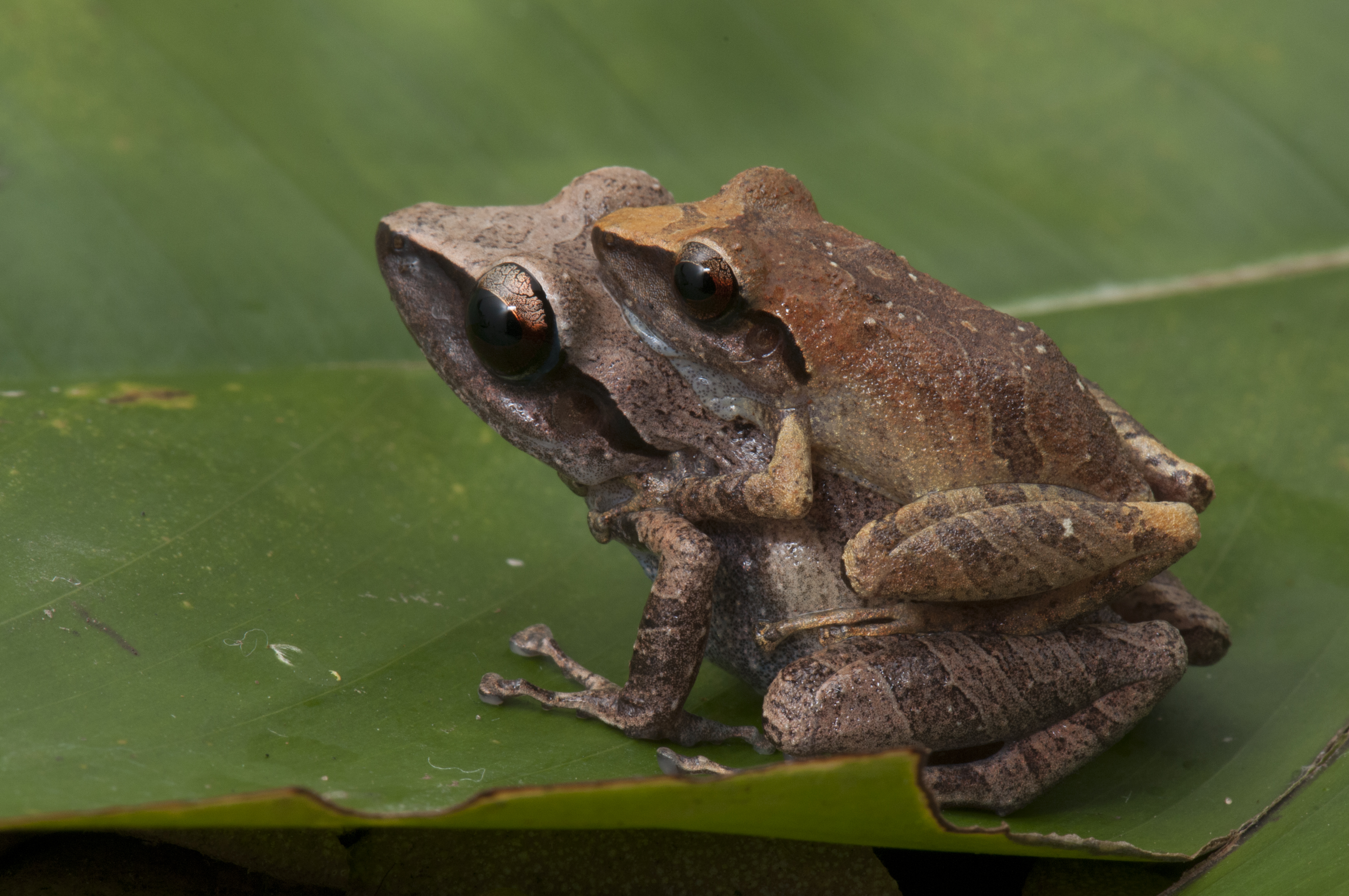

Conservation status
- Least Concern (IUCN 3.1)

Scientific classification
- Kingdom: Animalia
- Phylum: Chordata
- Class: Amphibia
- Order: Anura
- Family: Strabomantidae
- Genus: Pristimantis
- Species: P. vinhai

Binomial name
- Pristimantis vinhai (Bokermann, 1975)

Synonyms
- Eleutherodactylus vinhai Bokermann, 1975

= Pristimantis vinhai =

Species of frog in the family Craugastoridae from Brazil

Pristimantis vinhai is a species of frog in the family Strabomantidae. It is endemic to Brazil. Its natural habitat is tropical moist lowland forests. It is threatened by habitat loss.
