= Pristimantis variabilis =

Conservation status
- Least Concern (IUCN 3.1)

Scientific classification
- Kingdom: Animalia
- Phylum: Chordata
- Class: Amphibia
- Order: Anura
- Family: Strabomantidae
- Genus: Pristimantis
- Subgenus: Pristimantis
- Species: P. variabilis

Binomial name
- Pristimantis variabilis (Lynch, 1968)

Synonyms
- Eleutherodactylus variabilis Lynch, 1968

Species of frog

Pristimantis variabilis is a species of frog in the family Strabomantidae. It is found in the lowland Amazon rainforest and Andean slopes in southern Colombia, eastern Ecuador, eastern Peru, and western Brazil (Amphibian Species of the World includes Brazil only tentatively). The specific name variabilis refers to the variable dorsal coloration of this frog. Common name variable robber frog has been proposed for it.

== Description ==
Adult males measure 16–22 mm (0.6–0.9 in) and adult females 22–27 mm (0.9–1.1 in) in snout–vent length. The snout is acuminate in dorsal view and sloping in lateral profile. The tympanum is round and the supratympanic fold is well defined. The finger tips bear discs but no lateral fringes or webbing. The toe tips bear discs. The toes have poorly developed lateral fringes and slight webbing. Skin is dorsally shagreened, rarely smooth. The dorsum has variable coloration: the ground color can be cream, greenish brown, red, brown, or yellow, and there are brown, greenish brown, or reddish brown spots or stripes; these can be edged in yellow or yellow-green. The flanks are paler than the dorsum and marked with brown or black spots or bars. The posterior surface of thigh is usually dark gray-brown but is reddish-brown and reticulated with gray-brown in some individuals. The venter is white to creamy white and is flecked or spotted with black or greenish-brown. The groin is lemon-yellow edged with black. The iris is bronze with reddish or bronze horizontal stripe. The lip is bronze. There is also yellow or yellow-bronze spot below eye and dark brown or black canthalstripe.

== Habitat and conservation ==
Pristimantis variabilis occurs in primary and secondary forests and in disturbed areas at elevations of 0–2,047 m (0–6,716 ft) above sea level. It can be found on low vegetation at night and on the forest floor during the day. Development is direct (i.e, there is no free-living larval stage).

Pristimantis variabilis appears to be a common species over much of its range, and large areas of suitable habitat remain. It does not appear to face significant threats. It is present in a number of protected areas.
