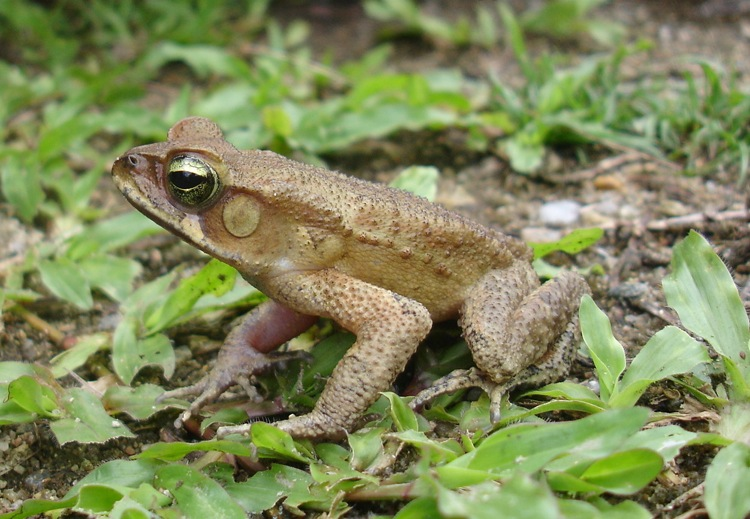

Conservation status
- Least Concern (IUCN 3.1)

Scientific classification
- Kingdom: Animalia
- Phylum: Chordata
- Class: Amphibia
- Order: Anura
- Family: Bufonidae
- Genus: Rhinella
- Species: R. abei

Binomial name
- Rhinella abei (Baldissera, Caramaschi, and Haddad, 2004)

Synonyms
- Bufo abei Baldissera, Caramaschi, and Haddad, 2004; Chaunus abei (Baldissera, Caramaschi, and Haddad, 2004)

= Rhinella abei =

Species of amphibian

Rhinella abei is a species of toad in the family Bufonidae. It is endemic to southeastern Brazil where it occurs in eastern Paraná, eastern Santa Catarina, and northern Rio Grande do Sul. Its natural habitats are lowland Atlantic Forest below 1,000 m (3,300 ft) asl. Its habitat is suffering from degradation and fragmentation caused by logging (in the past) and clearance for agriculture and coastal development, posing threats to this species.

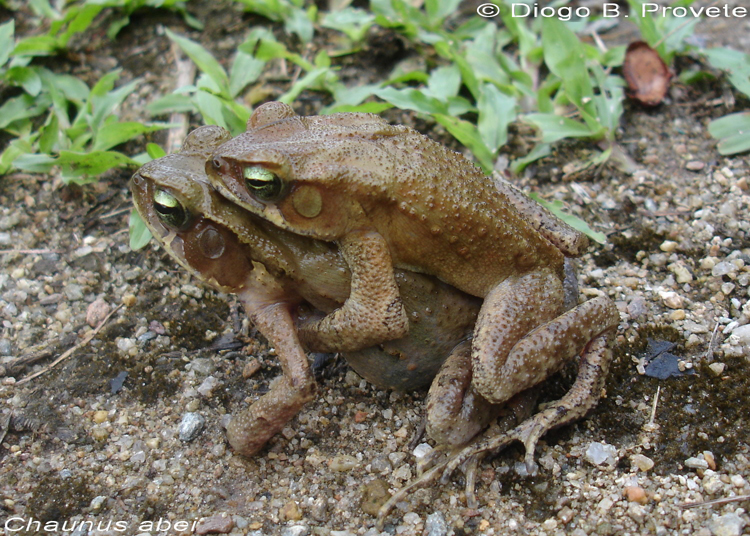
Rhinella abei in amplexus
