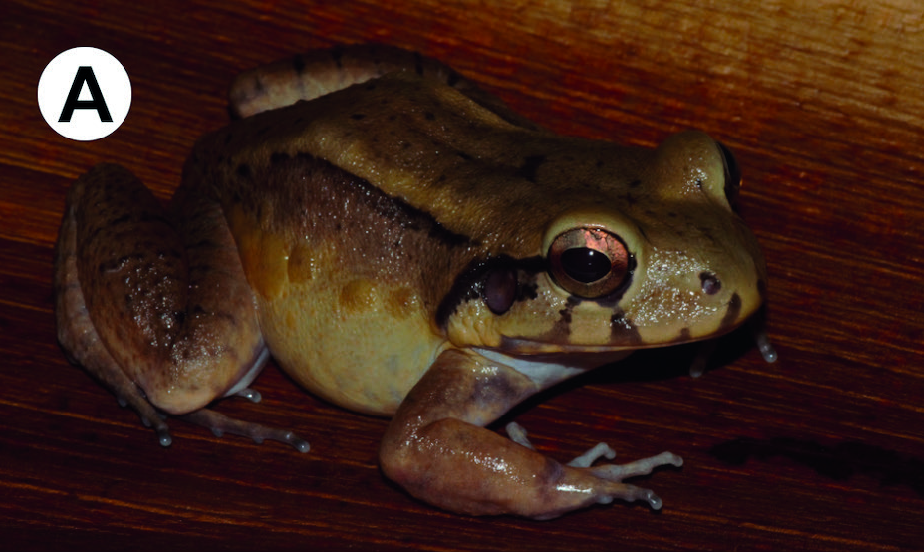
- Amapá. Brazil

Conservation status
- Least Concern (IUCN 3.1)

Scientific classification
- Kingdom: Animalia
- Phylum: Chordata
- Class: Amphibia
- Order: Anura
- Family: Leptodactylidae
- Genus: Leptodactylus
- Species: L. stenodema

Binomial name
- Leptodactylus stenodema Jiménez de la Espada, 1875

= Leptodactylus stenodema =

Species of frog

Popoco thin-toed frog, huhukɨ, San Jose white-lipped frog, rana terrestre de Moti, or rana dedilarga popoco (Leptodactylus stenodema) is a species of frog in the family Leptodactylidae. It is found in Brazil, Colombia, Ecuador, French Guiana, Guyana, Peru, Suriname, and possibly Bolivia.

== Body ==
The adult male frog measures 83.0–99.7 mm in snout-vent length and the adult female frog 82.0–100.3 mm. The skin of the frog's back is rose-brown, yellow-brown, or green-brown in color with small dark marks. The flanks are brown in color. The throat is gray or purple-gray or dark brown in color. The upper surfaces of the legs are gray-brown in color with lines. The iris of the eye is bronze in color on top and yellow on the bottom with a red line in between.

== Names ==
It is called huhukɨ in the Kwaza language of Rondônia, Brazil.

== Habitat ==
Its natural habitats are tropical rainforests, both primary and secondary. It lives on the forest floor and has been observed as high as 1200 meters above sea level. Scientists have reported it in many protected areas.

== Reproduction ==
The frog makes a foam nest for the eggs.

== Threats ==
The IUCN classifies this species as least concern of extinction, though in some parts of its range, it may be threatened by habitat loss associated with logging and agriculture.
