= Oreobates heterodactylus =

Caceres robber frog

Conservation status
- Data Deficient (IUCN 3.1)

Scientific classification
- Kingdom: Animalia
- Phylum: Chordata
- Class: Amphibia
- Order: Anura
- Family: Strabomantidae
- Genus: Oreobates
- Species: O. heterodactylus

Binomial name
- Oreobates heterodactylus (Miranda-Ribeiro, 1937)

Synonyms
- Eleutherodactylus heterodactylus (Miranda-Ribeiro, 1937); Eleutherodactylus crepitans Bokermann, 1965; Oreobates crepitans (Bokermann, 1965)

Species of amphibian

Oreobates heterodactylus, also known as the Caceres robber frog, is a species of frog in the family Strabomantidae. It is known from the semi-deciduous forest of the Precambrian Brazilian shield of western Brazil (Mato Grosso) and eastern Bolivia. It also inhabits the border areas of the Cerrado savanna and the Pantanal wetlands.
