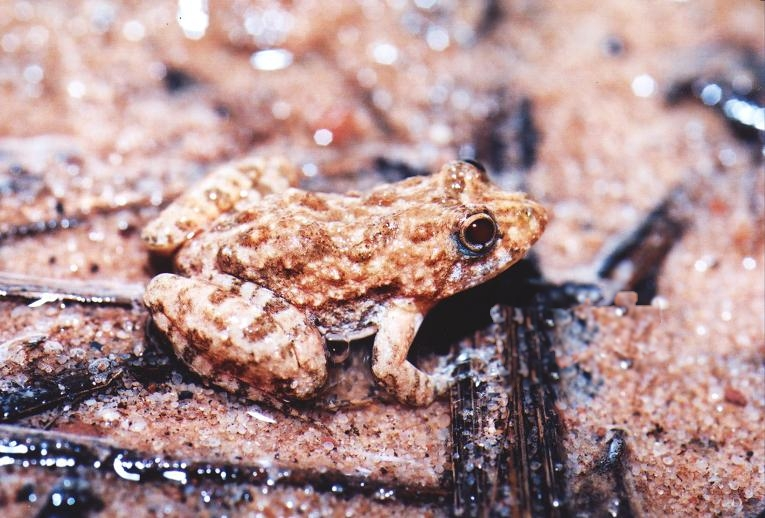

Conservation status
- Least Concern (IUCN 3.1)

Scientific classification
- Kingdom: Animalia
- Phylum: Chordata
- Class: Amphibia
- Order: Anura
- Family: Leptodactylidae
- Genus: Pseudopaludicola
- Species: P. ternetzi

Binomial name
- Pseudopaludicola ternetzi Miranda-Ribeiro, 1937

Synonyms
- Pseudopaludicola riopiedadensis Mercadal de Barrio & Barrio, 1994

= Pseudopaludicola ternetzi =

Species of frog

The Goias swamp frog (Pseudopaludicola ternetzi) is a species of frog in the family Leptodactylidae. It is endemic to Brazil and Paraguay.

== Habitat ==
This frog lives palm swamps, groundwater seeps, marshes, pools, and in humid areas within Cerrado. This frog has shown considerable tolerance to anthropogenic disturbance. It can live in pasture, parks, gardens, and irrigation ditches. Scientists have seen it between 400 and 1,200 m (1,300 and 3,900 ft) above sea level.

Scientists have reported these frogs in protected places.

== Reproduction ==
The female frog puts eggs in still water, where the tadpoles develop.

== Threats ==
The IUCN classifies this frog is least concern of extinction. In some parts of its range, some of the frogs may be in danger from intensive agriculture, fires, and dams projects.

== Taxonomic reevaluation ==
- Pansonato; et al. "raise questions concerning the status of this species, which requires reconsideration following revalidation of P. ameghini, which has had a confusing taxonomic history involving P. ternetzi". Zootaxa. 3620: 147–162.
