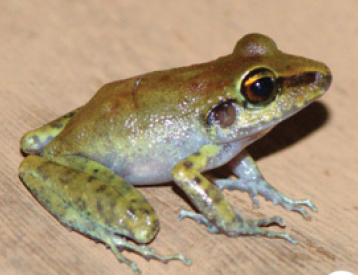

Conservation status
- Least Concern (IUCN 3.1)

Scientific classification
- Kingdom: Animalia
- Phylum: Chordata
- Class: Amphibia
- Order: Anura
- Family: Strabomantidae
- Genus: Pristimantis
- Species: P. zimmermanae

Binomial name
- Pristimantis zimmermanae (Heyer & Hardy, 1991)

Synonyms
- Eleutherodactylus zimmermanae Heyer & Hardy, 1991

= Pristimantis zimmermanae =

Species of frog

Pristimantis zimmermanae is a species of frog in the family Strabomantidae. It is found in the Amazonian Basin with records from Colombia (Amazonas Department), Bolivia, and Brazil. Its natural habitats are tropical moist lowland forests, also occurring in secondary and degraded habitats. It is a common species.
