= Syncope tridactyla =

Conservation status
- Least Concern (IUCN 3.1)

Scientific classification
- Kingdom: Animalia
- Phylum: Chordata
- Class: Amphibia
- Order: Anura
- Family: Microhylidae
- Genus: Syncope
- Species: S. tridactyla

Binomial name
- Syncope tridactyla (Duellman & Mendelson, 1995)

Species of frog

Syncope tridactyla is a species of frog in the family Microhylidae. It is found in the Amazon rainforest of Brazil, Peru, and Ecuador. Its natural habitat is tropical moist lowland forests. It is not present in modified habitats and is thereby locally threatened by habitat loss, but this is not considered to be a significant threat to the species as whole.
