= Pristimantis malkini =

Conservation status
- Least Concern (IUCN 3.1)

Scientific classification
- Kingdom: Animalia
- Phylum: Chordata
- Class: Amphibia
- Order: Anura
- Clade: Brachycephaloidea
- Family: Craugastoridae
- Genus: Pristimantis
- Species: P. malkini

Binomial name
- Pristimantis malkini (Lynch, 1980)

Synonyms
- Eleutherodactylus malkini Lynch, 1980

Species of frog

Pristimantis malkini is a species of frog in the family Strabomantidae. It is found in Brazil, Colombia, Ecuador, and Peru. Its natural habitats are tropical moist lowland forests, swamps, and rivers.
