= Pristimantis carvalhoi =

Conservation status
- Least Concern (IUCN 3.1)

Scientific classification
- Kingdom: Animalia
- Phylum: Chordata
- Class: Amphibia
- Order: Anura
- Family: Strabomantidae
- Genus: Pristimantis
- Species: P. carvalhoi

Binomial name
- Pristimantis carvalhoi (Lutz, 1952)

Synonyms
- Eleutherodactylus carvalhoi Lutz, 1952

Species of frog

Pristimantis carvalhoi is a species of frog in the family Strabomantidae. It is found in the upper Amazon Basin in Bolivia, Brazil, Colombia, Ecuador, and Peru. It occurs in primary and secondary flooding forest with close canopy. Though it can locally suffer from habitat loss, it is not threatened overall.
