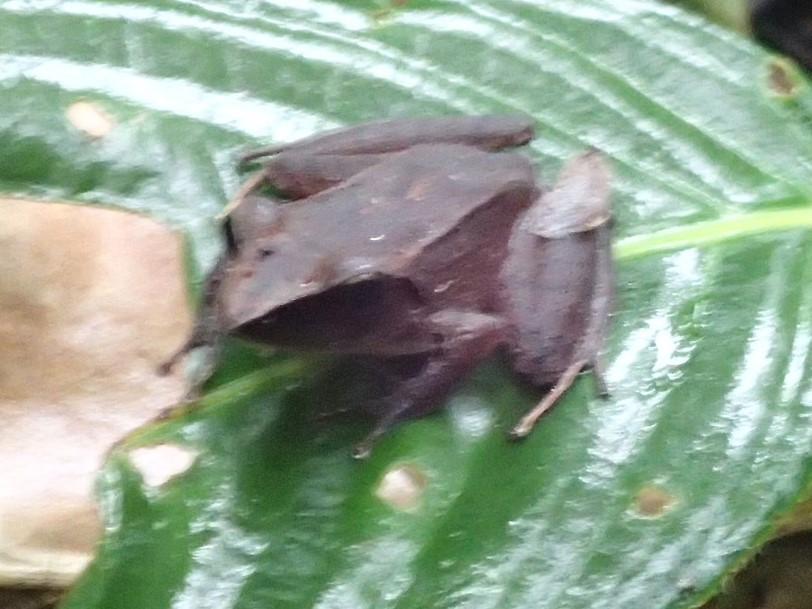

Conservation status
- Least Concern (IUCN 3.1)

Scientific classification
- Kingdom: Animalia
- Phylum: Chordata
- Class: Amphibia
- Order: Anura
- Family: Strabomantidae
- Genus: Pristimantis
- Species: P. conspicillatus

Binomial name
- Pristimantis conspicillatus (Günther, 1858)

Synonyms
- Eleutherodactylus conspicillatus (Günther, 1858)

= Pristimantis conspicillatus =

Species of frog

Pristimantis conspicillatus is a species of frog in the family Strabomantidae. It is found in Brazil, Colombia, Ecuador, and Peru. Its natural habitat is tropical moist lowland forests.
