= Physalaemus insperatus =

Conservation status
- Data Deficient (IUCN 3.1)

Scientific classification
- Kingdom: Animalia
- Phylum: Chordata
- Class: Amphibia
- Order: Anura
- Family: Leptodactylidae
- Genus: Physalaemus
- Species: P. insperatus

Binomial name
- Physalaemus insperatus Cruz, Cassini, and Caramaschi, 2008
- Physalaemus insperatus is only known from the Serra da Pedra Branca do Araraquara in Guaratuba, Brazil

Species of frog

Physalaemus insperatus is a species of frog in the family Leptodactylidae. It is endemic to southern Brazil and is only known from its type locality, Serra da Pedra Branca do Araraquara in Guaratuba, Paraná. The specific name insperatus means "unexpected" or "surprising" in Latin and alludes to the fortuitous finding of a new species among old museum specimens, originally identified as Physalaemus olfersii; taxonomically, it is part of the so-called Physalameus olfersii species group.

== Description ==
Based on the type series consisting of four adult males and two adult females, males measure 22–25 mm (0.9–1.0 in) and females 26 mm (1.0 in) in snout–vent length. The body is robust. The head is longer than it is wide. The snout is subelliptical in dorsal view and protruding in lateral view. The tympanum and the supratympanic fold are distinct. The canthus rostralis is distinct and the eyes are slightly protuberant. The arms are short and slender, and the fingers are very thin and long and with slightly expanded tips. The legs are moderately robust. The toes are very thin, long, and weakly fringed. Skin is smooth. Preserved specimens are dorsally light brown with scattered brown dots. A middorsal fold is well marked on the sacral region with light brown color. A brown line runs from the tip of snout to the eye and brown stripe on the flank. There are dispersed brown dots on the loreal region. Males have a well-developed vocal sac.

== Habitat and conservation ==
The species was found in a patch of primary forest growing on steep slopes in Brazil's Atlantic Forest biome. It was later described from museum specimens, so there is no specific information on its microhabitat or ecology. The type series was collected in 1951 from Guaratuba Environmental Protection Area. While the type locality is located within intact forest inside a protected area, frogs that live elsewhere may be in some danger from habitat loss.
