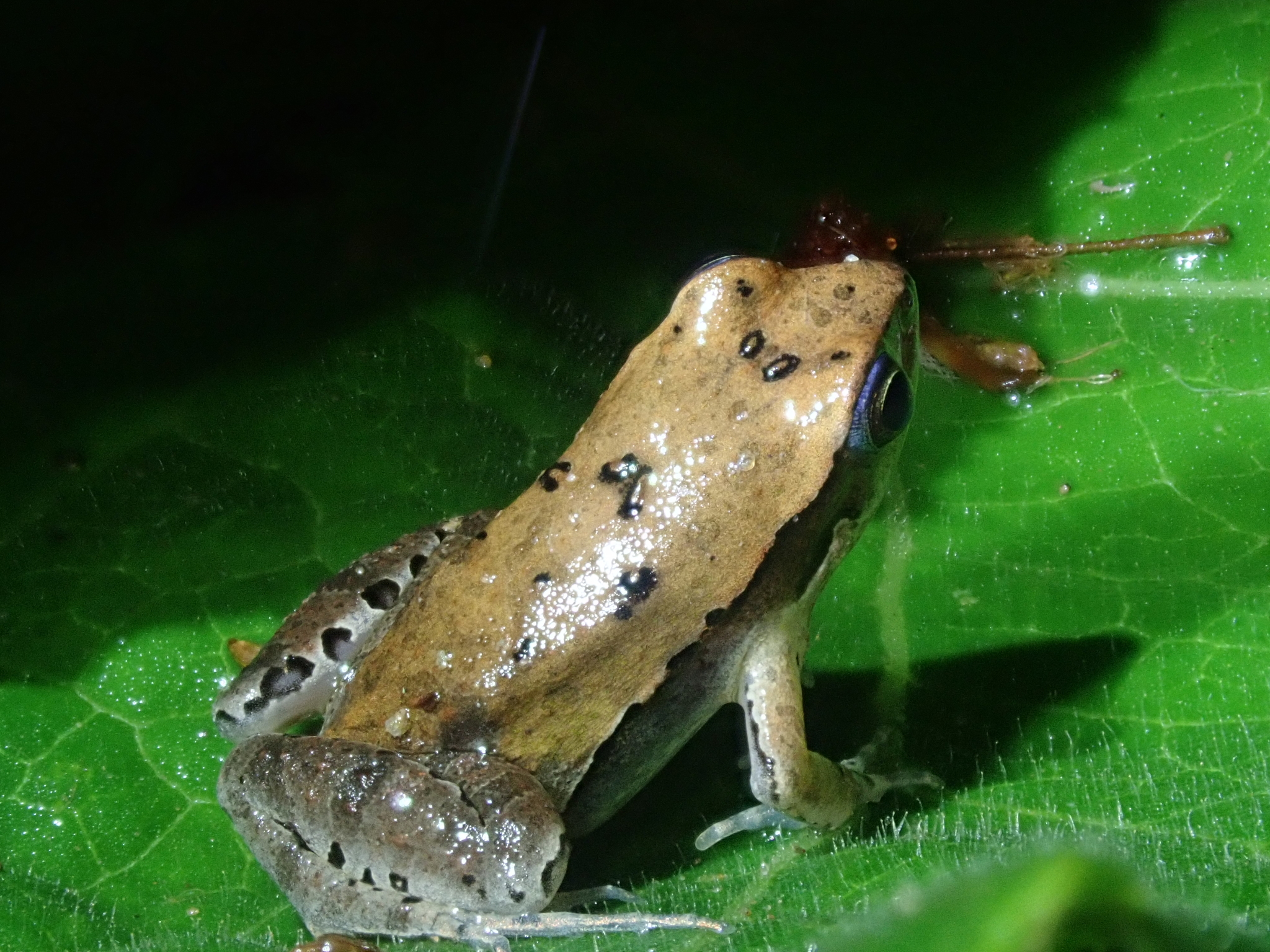

Conservation status
- Least Concern (IUCN 3.1)

Scientific classification
- Kingdom: Animalia
- Phylum: Chordata
- Class: Amphibia
- Order: Anura
- Family: Leptodactylidae
- Genus: Physalaemus
- Species: P. cuqui

Binomial name
- Physalaemus cuqui Lobo, 1993

= Physalaemus cuqui =

Species of frog

Physalaemus cuqui is a species of frog in the family Leptodactylidae. It is found in Argentina, Bolivia, and possibly Paraguay. Its natural habitats are subtropical or tropical dry forests, subtropical or tropical dry shrubland, subtropical or tropical moist shrubland, intermittent freshwater marshes, arable land, pastureland, ponds, irrigated land, and canals and ditches.

== Taxonomy ==
In 2023, it was suggested that it is a junior synonym of Physalaemus albonotatus, as it was found to lack the characters previously considered to diagnose the species. The characters they looked at were advertisement calls, morphometric variables and osteology and the molecular analisys put them in the same lineage.
