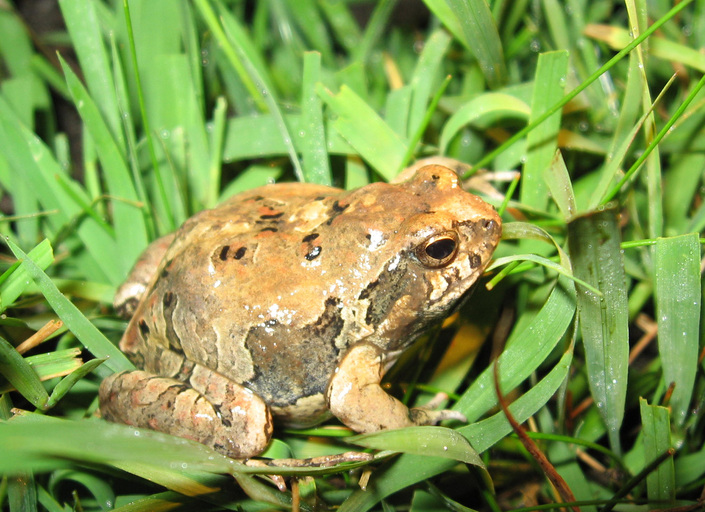

Conservation status
- Least Concern (IUCN 3.1)

Scientific classification
- Kingdom: Animalia
- Phylum: Chordata
- Class: Amphibia
- Order: Anura
- Family: Leptodactylidae
- Genus: Physalaemus
- Species: P. biligonigerus

Binomial name
- Physalaemus biligonigerus (Cope, 1861)

= Physalaemus biligonigerus =

Species of frog

Physalaemus biligonigerus is a species of frog in the family Leptodactylidae. It is found in Argentina, Bolivia, Brazil, Paraguay, and Uruguay.

== Habitat ==
This frog lives in grasslands not far from water. In Brazil, this frog has been found in Cerrado and Pampa biomes. This frog has shown some tolerance to anthropogenic disturbance. Scientists have seen it between 0 and 1,400 m (0 and 4,593 ft) above sea level.

Scientists have reported the frog in protected places: Parque Estadual Itapeva, Parque Nacional da Lagoa do Peixe, and Reserva Biológica Lami Jose Lutzenberger.

== Reproduction ==
The male frog perches near or in the water and calls to the female frogs. The female frog deposits her eggs in a spherical foam nest that floats on top of the water. The female frogs are notably fecund, producing many hundreds of per individual per year.

== Threats ==
The IUCN Red List and the Red Lists of Uruguay and Paraguay all classify this species as not in danger of extinction. In some places, it is in some danger from water pollution and habitat loss. For example, in Argentina, people convert the Chaco to make farmland and extract wood for use. This frog has been seen on the international pet trade, but scientists do not consider that a serious threat to the species.
