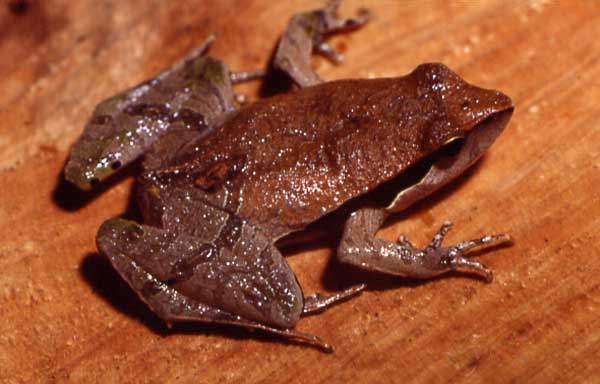

Conservation status
- Least Concern (IUCN 3.1)

Scientific classification
- Kingdom: Animalia
- Phylum: Chordata
- Class: Amphibia
- Order: Anura
- Family: Leptodactylidae
- Genus: Physalaemus
- Species: P. lisei

Binomial name
- Physalaemus lisei Braun & Braun, 1977

= Physalaemus lisei =

Species of frog

Physalaemus lisei is a species of frog in the family Leptodactylidae. It is endemic to Brazil.

== Habitat ==
The frog is found on the leaf litter in Brazil's Atlantic forest biome. It lives in secondary forest, edges of forests, and on tree farms. Scientists have reported this frog between 0 and 1,200 m (0 and 3,937 ft) above sea level.

The frog's known range overlaps that of several protected parks: Floresta Nacional de São Francisco de Paula, Parque Estadual Itapeva, Parque Municipal Sertão, Parque Nacional da Serra Geral, Parque Nacional de Aparados da Serra, and Reserva Biológica Lami Jose Lutzenberger.

== Reproduction ==
This frog breeds through larval development in temporary bodies of water, such as puddles. The adult frog makes a foam nest for the eggs. The nest is attached to grass.

== Threats ==
The IUCN classifies this frog as least concern of extinction. What threat it faces comes from deforestation and logging.
