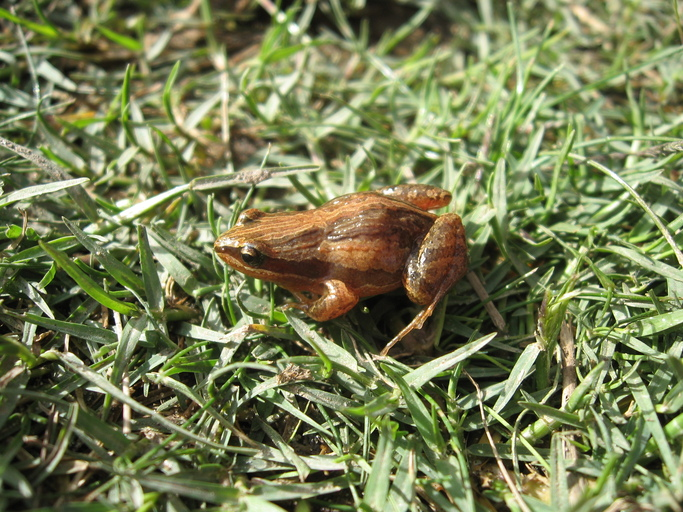

Conservation status
- Least Concern (IUCN 3.1)

Scientific classification
- Kingdom: Animalia
- Phylum: Chordata
- Class: Amphibia
- Order: Anura
- Family: Leptodactylidae
- Genus: Physalaemus
- Species: P. henselii

Binomial name
- Physalaemus henselii (Peters, 1872)

Synonyms
- Paludicola henselii Peters, 1872; Paludicola henseli Boulenger, 1882; Physalaemus henselii Parker, 1927

= Physalaemus henselii =

Species of frog

Physalaemus henselii is a species of frog in the family Leptodactylidae. It is found in Argentina, Brazil, and Uruguay.

== Habitat ==
This frog is found in grassy places near water. It has been observed in modified habitats, including urban areas. Scientists have seen it between 0 and 750 m (0 and 2,461 ft) above sea level.

Scientists have reported the frog in several protected areas: Area de Manejo de Habitats y/o Especies Cerro Verde, Área de Proteção Ambiental Banhado Grande, Área de Proteção Ambiental do Ibirapuita, Parque Nacional da Lagoa do Peixe, and Reserva Biológica Lami Jose Lutzenberger.

== Reproduction ==
The adult frog builds a foam nest for the eggs. The frog breeds from April to June, which is fall and winter in Uruguay.

== Threats ==
Scientists from the IUCN and from Uruguay classify this species as least concern of extinction. In some areas, some of the frogs may be in some danger from soil and water pollution from farms. In Uruguay, scientists found the fungus Batrachochytrium dendrobatidis on some of the frogs. They believe the disease chytridiomycosis may be responsible for some established dieoffs.
