= Physalaemus angrensis =

Conservation status
- Critically Endangered (IUCN 3.1)

Scientific classification
- Kingdom: Animalia
- Phylum: Chordata
- Class: Amphibia
- Order: Anura
- Family: Leptodactylidae
- Genus: Physalaemus
- Species: P. angrensis

Binomial name
- Physalaemus angrensis Weber, Gonzaga, & Carvalho-e-Silva 2006

Species of amphibian

Physalaemus angrensis is a species of frog in the family Leptodactylidae. It is endemic to the Atlantic Forest of the Rio de Janeiro state in southeastern Brazil. It is a small frog, and is reported to have a similar call to its congener, P. moreirae.

This frog is an obligate forest dweller. Though it has been found in both primary and secondary forest, it has not been found in other habitats. Scientists have seen it on the leaf litter.

Physalaemus angrensis is considered critically endangered by the IUCN, due to its extremely small known range of 4 square kilometres (1.5 sq mi) in a single location, as well as ongoing habitat degradation in favor of agriculture, livestock cultivation, and the Br-101 highway project.
