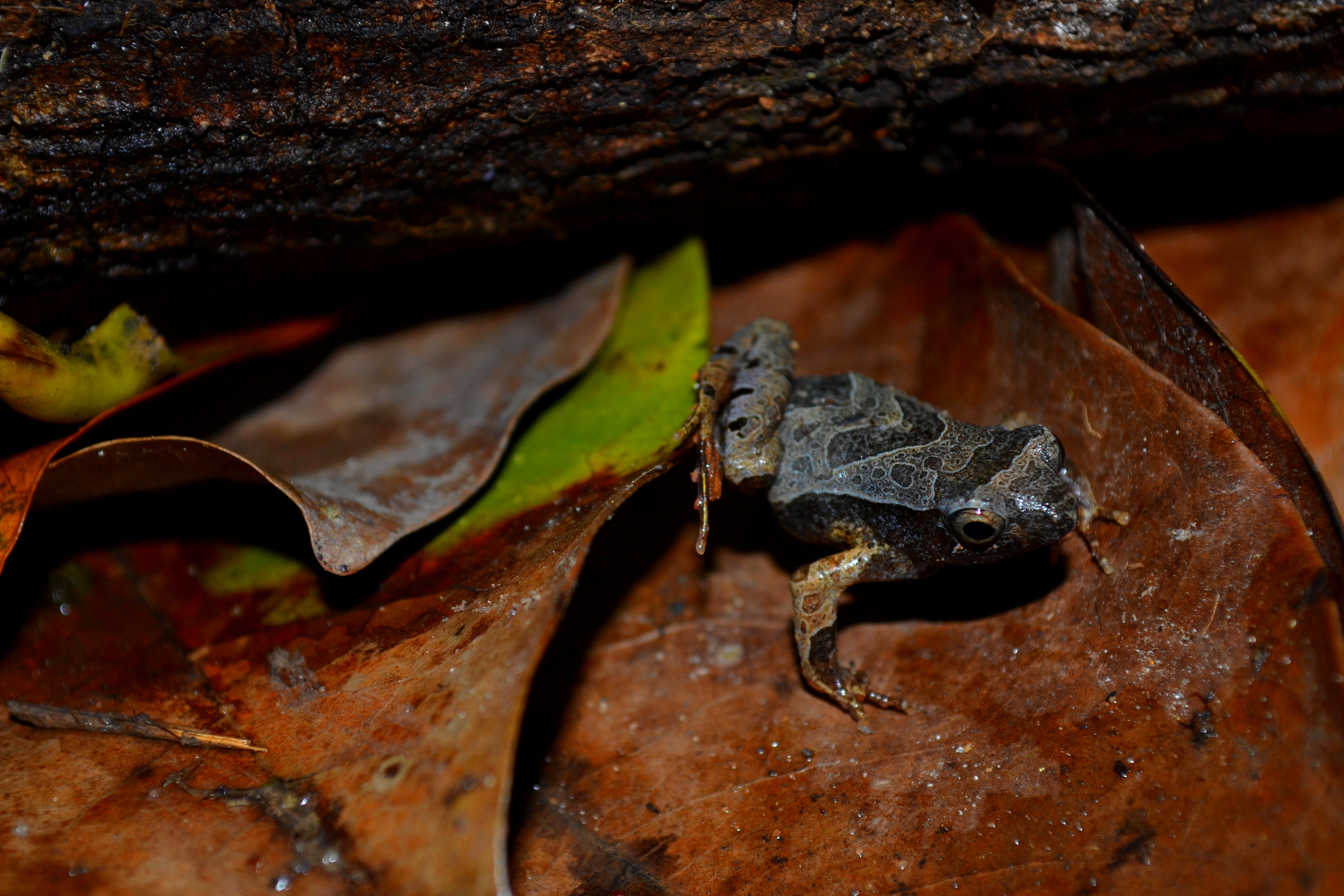

Conservation status
- Vulnerable (IUCN 3.1)

Scientific classification
- Kingdom: Animalia
- Phylum: Chordata
- Class: Amphibia
- Order: Anura
- Family: Leptodactylidae
- Genus: Physalaemus
- Species: P. caete

Binomial name
- Physalaemus caete Pombal & Madureira, 1997

= Physalaemus caete =

Species of frog

Physalaemus caete is a species of frog in the family Leptodactylidae. It is endemic to Brazil.

== Habitat ==
This frog is found on the leaf litter near ponds in rainforests. Scientists have seen it between 0 and 750 m (0 and 2,461 ft) above sea level. It has been reported in a few protected places: ESEC de Caetes, ESEC de Murici, and APA Aldeia-Beberibe.

== Reproduction ==
These frogs reproduce by larval development. They deposit their eggs in floating nests in temporary ponds and water-filled holes in trees.

== Threats ==
The IUCN classifies this species as vulnerable to extinction. Its principal threats are habitat loss in favor of urbanization, agriculture, and logging.
