= Physalaemus irroratus =

Conservation status
- Data Deficient (IUCN 3.1)

Scientific classification
- Kingdom: Animalia
- Phylum: Chordata
- Class: Amphibia
- Order: Anura
- Family: Leptodactylidae
- Genus: Physalaemus
- Species: P. irroratus

Binomial name
- Physalaemus irroratus Cruz, Nascimento, and Feio, 2007

Species of frog

Physalaemus irroratus is a species of frog in the family Leptodactylidae. It is found in Brazil.

== Habitat ==
Scientists found this frog in well-preserved and secondary forest in Brazil's Atlantic Forest biome. Scientists have seen this frog about 800 m (2,600 ft) above sea level.

Scientists have reported the frog in a single protected place, Refúgio Estadual De Vida Silvestre Mata Dos Muriquis. They believe it could also live in nearby Parque Estadual Alto Do Cariri and Parque Nacional Do Alto Cariri.

== Reproduction ==
The male frogs sit near temporary ponds or the edges of forests and call to the female frogs. This frog lays eggs in floating foam nest. The tadpoles develop in the water.

== Threats ==
The IUCN classifies this species as data deficient. The scientists first found the frog on a farm in an area with many protected parks established in 2008, 2009, and 2010, so there is considerable forest nearby. There are also newly forested areas regrowing over former farmland and pasture. In other parts of what may be the frog's range, however, deforestation in favor of agriculture and livestock cultivation may pose a threat.

== Original description ==
- Cruz CAG; Nascimento LB; Feio RN (2007). "A new species of the genus Physalaemus Fitzinger from southeastern Brazil". Amphibia-Reptilia. 28: 457–465.
