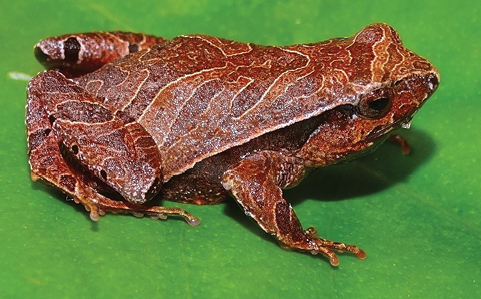
- Espírito Santo, Brazil

Conservation status
- Least Concern (IUCN 3.1)

Scientific classification
- Kingdom: Animalia
- Phylum: Chordata
- Class: Amphibia
- Order: Anura
- Family: Leptodactylidae
- Genus: Physalaemus
- Species: P. maculiventris

Binomial name
- Physalaemus maculiventris (Lutz, 1925)

Synonyms
- Eupemphix maculiventris Lutz, 1925

= Physalaemus maculiventris =

Species of frog

Physalaemus maculiventris is a species of frog in the family Leptodactylidae. It is endemic to Southeast and South Brazil and is known primarily from the Serra do Mar in Espírito Santo, Rio de Janeiro, São Paulo state, Paraná, and Santa Catarina states. Common name Mantagnes dwarf frog has been proposed for it.

== Description ==
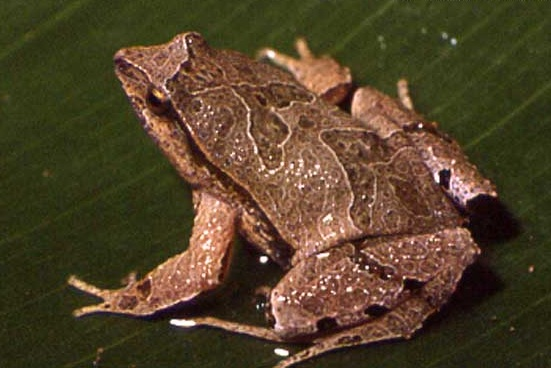
P. maculiventris

Adult males measure 19–22 mm (0.7–0.9 in) and adult females 20–25 mm (0.8–1.0 in) in snout–vent length.

The snout is pointed or pointed-subelliptical in dorsal view and acute or rounded-acute in profile. The tympanum is not visible. The finger and toe tips are rounded or slightly swollen but without discs; webbing is also absent. The dorsum is brown and tan with yellow outlining. The hands and feet have orange highlights. The iris is bronze. Males have a single vocal sac.

== Habitat and conservation ==
Physalaemus maculiventris occurs in primary and secondary forest at elevations of about between 800 and 1,200 m (2,600 and 3,900 ft) above sea level; it can occur on the forest edge but not in more open areas. It is terrestrial frog usually found on the leaf litter temporary bodies of water. Breeding takes place via larval development in temporary bodies of water where a foam nest is built.

Physalaemus maculiventris is a common species, but it can be threatened by forest loss]] associated with urbanization, both small- and large-scale agriculture, silviculture, and cattle grazing. It is found in several protected areas.
