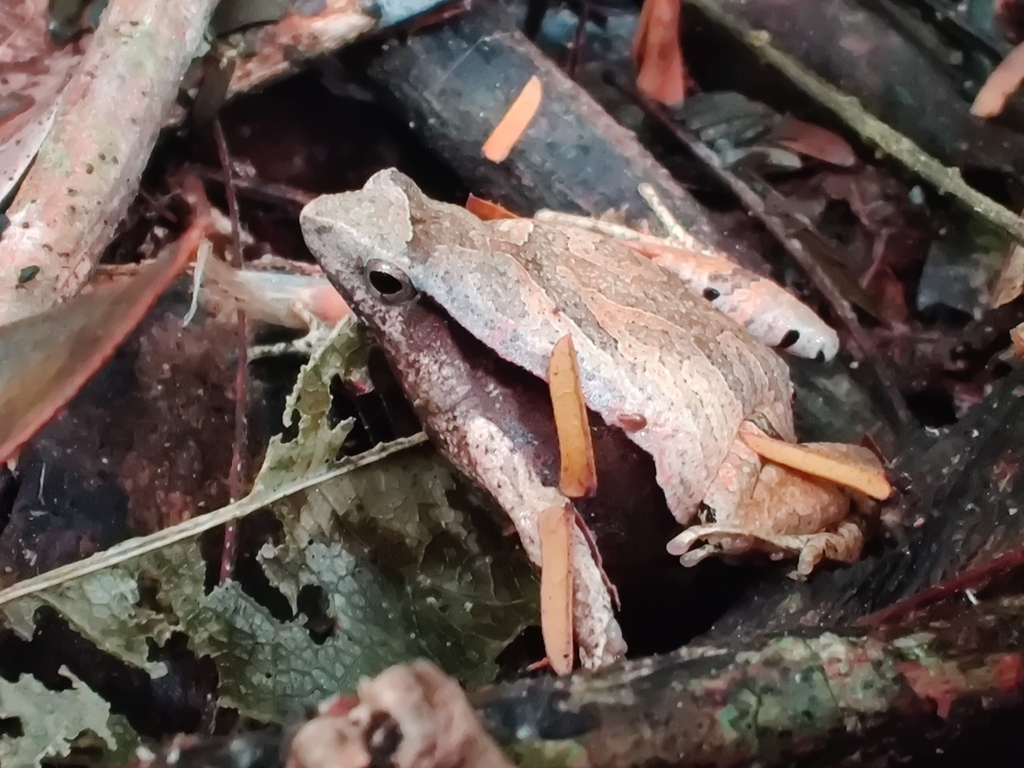

Conservation status
- Least Concern (IUCN 3.1)

Scientific classification
- Kingdom: Animalia
- Phylum: Chordata
- Class: Amphibia
- Order: Anura
- Family: Leptodactylidae
- Genus: Physalaemus
- Species: P. obtectus

Binomial name
- Physalaemus obtectus Bokermann, 1966

= Physalaemus obtectus =

Species of frog

Physalaemus obtectus is a species of frog in the family Leptodactylidae. It is called Linhares dwarf frog in English. It is endemic to Brazil.

== Habitat ==
The frog is an obligate forest dweller. It is found in primary and secondary forest but nowhere else. People see it on the leaf litter, under leaves, and near temporary bodies of water. Scientists have seen this frog between 0 and 500 m (0 and 1,640 ft) above sea level. Scientists have reported the frog in protected places.

== Reproduction ==
The male frog sits near a puddle or partially submerged in the water and calls to the female frogs. The adult frog makes a foam nest that rests on the leaf litter or next to the water. The tadpoles develop in the water.

== Threats ==
The IUCN classifies this frog as least concern of extinction. Because it is a forest obligate, it is in some danger from human-induced habitat loss associated with urbanization, silviculture, large- and small-scale agriculture, and livestock grazing.
