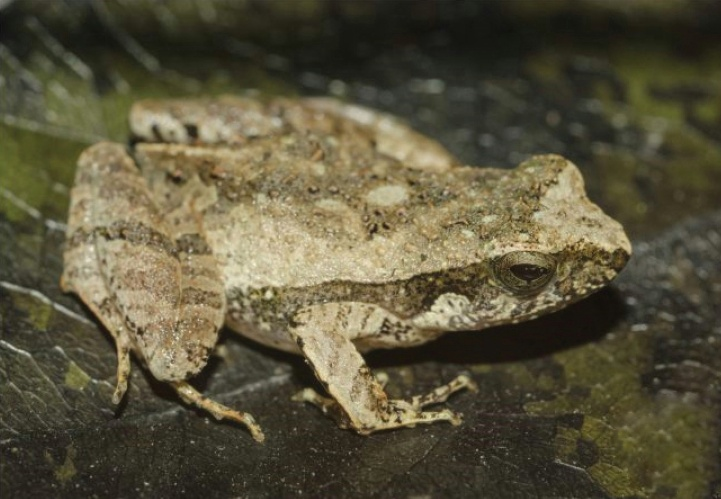

Conservation status
- Least Concern (IUCN 3.1)

Scientific classification
- Kingdom: Animalia
- Phylum: Chordata
- Class: Amphibia
- Order: Anura
- Family: Leptodactylidae
- Genus: Physalaemus
- Species: P. ephippifer

Binomial name
- Physalaemus ephippifer (Steindachner, 1864)

Synonyms
- Leiuperus ephippifer Steindachner, 1864

= Physalaemus ephippifer =

Species of frog

Physalaemus ephippifer is a species of frog in the family Leptodactylidae. It is found in central and eastern Brazilian Amazonia, the Guianas (Guyana, Suriname, French Guiana), and southern Venezuela (Bolívar state). It might not occur in French Guiana.

== Description ==
Physalaemus ephippifer measure 21.0 to 39.6 mm (0.83 to 1.56 in) in snout–vent length. The body is slightly elongated with a pointed snout. The tympanum is barely visible. The back is typically smooth but has warts in some specimens; there are few longitudinal ridges. The dorsal colouration is light to reddish brown, with a variable degree of greyish markings. There is a black stripe running from the tip of the snout to the eye, continuing as a black band on the flank. The ventral colour is creamy or yellowish. The legs are barred with dark brown and there are red or orange patches in the armpits and groin. The fingers and toes are unwebbed.

== Habitat and ecology ==
Physalaemus ephippifer is a nocturnal frog that spends much of the daytime buried in sand. It is a common, adaptable species that benefits from human disturbance. It is found at the edges of forests, in clearings, and in human-modified habitats. In Suriname it is a common species of the savanna belt and the interior areas. Scientists have seen it between 0 and 350 m (0 and 1,148 ft) above sea level.

The species breeds in temporary pools during the late wet season. The female makes a foam nest by secreting a fluid from the oviduct which the male whips into a foam with his hind legs. The eggs are hidden in the foam and hatch in about three days. After two or three days more the tadpoles emerge from the foam and subsequently develop in the water. It is thought that the foam deters predators, including older tadpoles of the same species.

== Status ==
This frog has a wide range and is a common species with a large total population. It is an adaptable species and is found in areas disturbed by humans, and no particular threats have been recognised. The International Union for Conservation of Nature has rated its conservation status as being of least concern.
