= Physalaemus carrizorum =

Conservation status
- Least Concern (IUCN 3.1)

Scientific classification
- Kingdom: Animalia
- Phylum: Chordata
- Class: Amphibia
- Order: Anura
- Family: Leptodactylidae
- Genus: Physalaemus
- Species: P. carrizorum

Binomial name
- Physalaemus carrizorum Cardozo and Pereyra, 2018

Species of frog

Physalaemus carrizorum is a species of frog in the family Leptodactylidae. It is found in Brazil.

== Description ==
The adult male frog measures about 32.0 mm in snout-vent length and the adult female frog 34.0 mm.

== Habitat ==
This terrestrial frog is found in lowland forests that are not high above sea level. Scientists have seen this frog between 130 and 815 m (427 and 2,674 ft) above sea level. It has shown some tolerance to pollution and habitat disturbance.

Scientists have reported the frog in some protected places: Parque Provincial Cruce Caballero, Parque Provincial Moconá, and Parque Provincial El Piñalito.

== Reproduction ==
The adult frog builds a foam nest for its eggs. The tadpoles develop in temporary pools.

== Threats ==
The IUCN classifies this frog as least concern of extinction, citing its tolerance to pollution.
