= Physalaemus aguirrei =

Conservation status
- Least Concern (IUCN 3.1)

Scientific classification
- Kingdom: Animalia
- Phylum: Chordata
- Class: Amphibia
- Order: Anura
- Family: Leptodactylidae
- Genus: Physalaemus
- Species: P. aguirrei

Binomial name
- Physalaemus aguirrei Bokermann, 1966

Species of frog

Physalaemus aguirrei is a species of frog in the family Leptodactylidae. It is endemic to eastern Brazil and occurs in the southern Bahia, northern Espírito Santo and northeastern Minas Gerais. The specific name aguirrei honours Alvaro Coutinho Aguirre, a Brazilian zoologist. The common name Linhares dwarf frog has been proposed for it.

== Habitat and conservation ==
Physalaemus aguirrei is a ground-living species found in forests, forest edges, degraded habitats, pastures, and swamps at elevations up to 600 m (2,000 ft) above sea level. It breeds using foam nests in temporary ponds. It is a common species, classified as least concern of extinction by the IUCN. It is present in several protected areas.
