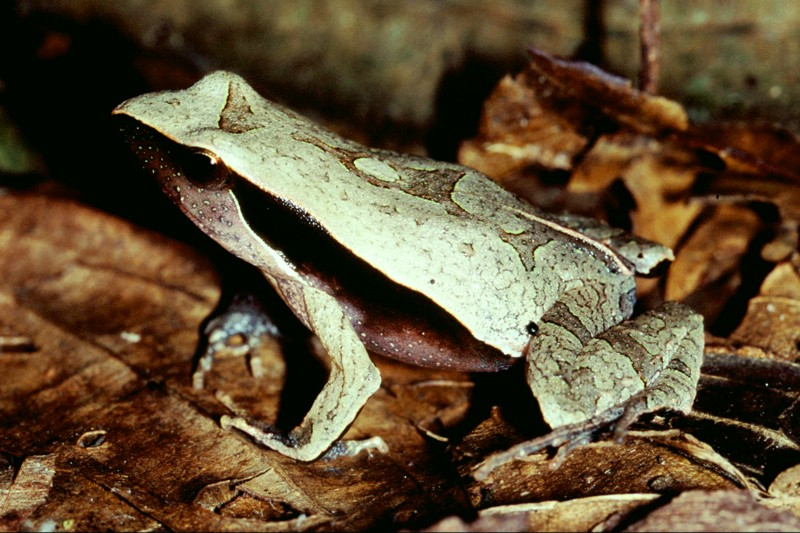

Conservation status
- Least Concern (IUCN 3.1)

Scientific classification
- Kingdom: Animalia
- Phylum: Chordata
- Class: Amphibia
- Order: Anura
- Family: Leptodactylidae
- Genus: Physalaemus
- Species: P. olfersii

Binomial name
- Physalaemus olfersii (Lichtenstein and Martens, 1856)

Synonyms
- Phryniscus olfersii Lichtenstein and Martens, 1856; Phrynidium olfersi — Cope, 1867; Paludicola olfersi — Peters, 1882; Physalaemus olfersi — Parker, 1927

= Physalaemus olfersii =

Species of frog

Physalaemus olfersii is a species of frog in the family Leptodactylidae. It is endemic to southeastern Brazil and is known from Espírito Santo, southeastern Minas Gerais, and São Paulo states. Records further south (southern São Paulo, Paraná, and Santa Catarina) refer to Physalaemus lateristriga, which was restored from the synonymy of Physalaemus olfersii in 2010. The common name Atlantic Forest dwarf frog has been proposed for this species.

== Etymology ==
The specific name olfersii honors Ignaz von Olfers, German naturalist, historian, and diplomat.

== Description ==
Adult males measure 26–36 mm (1.0–1.4 in) and adult females 22–41 mm (0.9–1.6 in) in snout–vent length. The body is moderately robust. The head is longer than it is wide. The snout is pointed to sub-elliptical in dorsal view and acute in lateral view. The tympanum is in distinct as is the supra-tympanic fold. The fingers and the toes are thin and long and have slightly expanded tips; no webbing is present. Dorsal coloration varies from light brown to gray with small, irregular, and scattered brown blotches. A median line is present on the posterior 2/3 of the dorsum. The loreal region is dark brown with some dispersed white dots. A black stripe runs from the postorbital region to the anterior margin of the inguinal gland. A weak white line runs on the canthus rostralis, becoming well marked on the border of the upper eyelid and on the dorsolateral fold. The gular is dark gray with white dots that continue to the anterior part of the abdomen; the posterior of the abdomen is uniformly light brown. Males have a subgular vocal sac.

== Habitat and conservation ==
Physalaemus olfersii occurs in primary and secondary forest at elevations below 1,200 m (3,900 ft). It lives in the leaf litter, on the ground, and in low vegetation and does not require a closed-canopy habitat. Breeding takes place in temporary and permanent ponds.

The IUCN classifies this species as least concern of extinction. Much of the large-scale logging that once affected the area has given way to small-scale wood harvesting, and large swaths of suitable forest habitat remain, much of it in officially protected reas. About 50 percent of this population remains affected by human interference, however, in the form of habitat fragmentation and habitat loss associated with urbanization, small-scale and cash-crop agriculture, silviculture, and cattle grazing.
