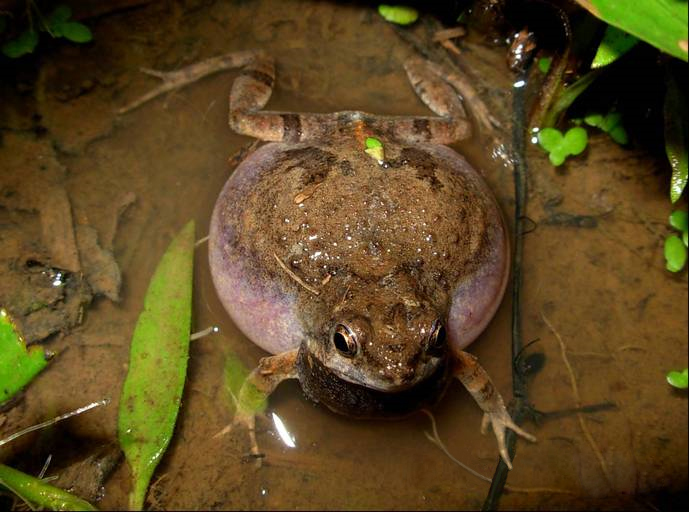

Conservation status
- Least Concern (IUCN 3.1)

Scientific classification
- Kingdom: Animalia
- Phylum: Chordata
- Class: Amphibia
- Order: Anura
- Family: Leptodactylidae
- Genus: Physalaemus
- Species: P. fischeri

Binomial name
- Physalaemus fischeri (Boulenger, 1890)

Synonyms
- Paludicola fischeri Boulenger, 1890; Physalaemus enesefae Heatwole, Solano, and Heatwole, 1965; Physalaemus fischeri Gorham, 1966; Physalaemus neglectus dunni Cochran and Goin, 1970; Physalaemus cuvieri dunni Harding, 1983

= Physalaemus fischeri =

Species of frog

Physalaemus fischeri, Heatwole's dwarf frog or Fischer's dwarf frog, is a species of frog in the family Leptodactylidae. It is endemic to Colombia and Venezuela.

== Habitat ==
This nocturnal frog is found in savannahs and other grasslands, shrubland, and tropical rainforests. Scientists have seen it between 0 and 800 m (0 and 2,625 ft) above sea level. This species has been reported in protected areas.

== Reproduction ==
The male frogs sit near plants and call to the female frogs. These frogs reproduce by larval development in temporary and permanent pools.

== Threats ==
The IUCN classifies this species as least concern of extinction. In some places, it is in some danger from fires.
