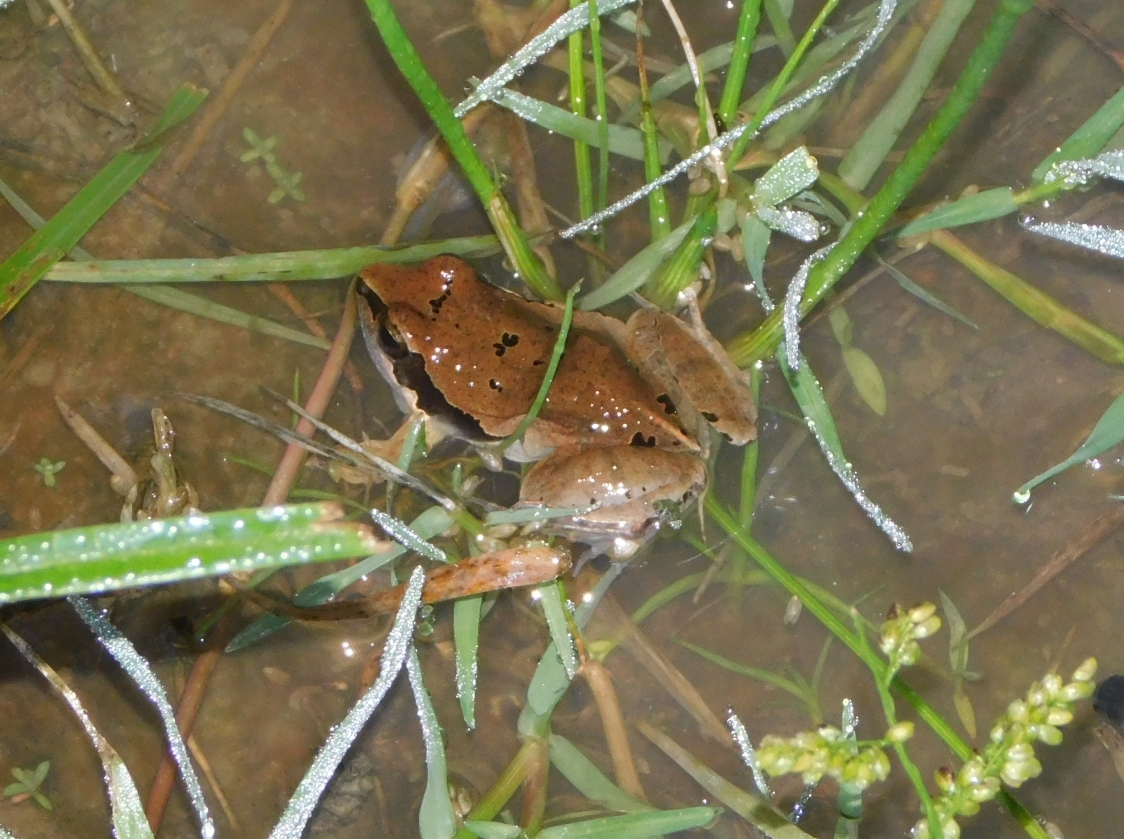

Scientific classification
- Kingdom: Animalia
- Phylum: Chordata
- Class: Amphibia
- Order: Anura
- Family: Leptodactylidae
- Genus: Physalaemus
- Species: P. cristinae

Binomial name
- Physalaemus cristinae Cardozo et al., 2023

= Physalaemus cristinae =

Species of frog

Physalaemus cristinae is a species of frog in the family Leptodactylidae. It is found in Humid Chaco, Southern Cone Mesopotamian savanna, Humid Pampas, Uruguay and Espinal ecoregions of Argentina and Paraguay.

== Description ==
The frog measures about 20.5-32.0 mm in snout-vent length. The skin of the dorsum is smooth and can be either green in color or green with some brown.

== Etymology ==
The specific epithet is a tribute to Cristina Elisabet Fernández de Kirchner for her, according to the authors, extraordinary contributions to the improvement of the educative and scientific systems in Argentina.
