= Physalaemus evangelistai =

Conservation status
- Near Threatened (IUCN 3.1)

Scientific classification
- Kingdom: Animalia
- Phylum: Chordata
- Class: Amphibia
- Order: Anura
- Family: Leptodactylidae
- Genus: Physalaemus
- Species: P. evangelistai

Binomial name
- Physalaemus evangelistai Bokermann, 1967

Species of frog

Physalaemus evangelistai is a species of frog in the family Leptodactylidae. It is endemic to Brazil.

== Habitat ==
The frog lives only lives in specific microhabitats in campos repuestres, dry, rocky savannah in Brazil's Atlantic Forest and Cerrado biomes. It has been observed on the ground in areas where the water table is close to the surface. It has not shown tolerance to anthropogenic disturbance. Scientists have seen this frog between 800 and 1,500 m (2,600 and 4,900 ft) above sea level.

Scientists have reported the frog in protected places: Parque Nacional da Serra do Cipó, Reserva Particular do Patrimônio Natural Santuário do Caraça, and Parque Estadual Rio Preto.

== Reproduction ==
The frog reproduces in marshland. The adult frog makes a foam nest that floats on top of the water. The tadpoles develop in the water.

== Threats ==
Scientists from the IUCN classify this species as near threatened. It can only live in campos rupestres that have specific humidity levels, making it very sensitive to climate change. Historically, it has also suffered from habitat loss associated with livestock cultivation, but little further loss is taking place as of 2023.
