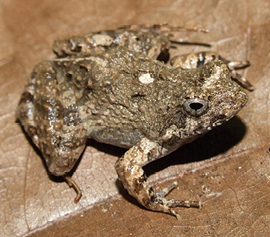

Conservation status
- Least Concern (IUCN 3.1)

Scientific classification
- Kingdom: Animalia
- Phylum: Chordata
- Class: Amphibia
- Order: Anura
- Family: Leptodactylidae
- Genus: Physalaemus
- Species: P. erikae

Binomial name
- Physalaemus erikae Cruz and Pimenta, 2004

= Physalaemus erikae =

Species of frog

Physalaemus erikae is a species of frog in the family Leptodactylidae. It is endemic to eastern Brazil and currently known only from southern Bahia, although it is likely that its range extends into nearby areas in northeastern Minas Gerais and northern Espírito Santo with similar vegetation.

== Etymology ==
Physalaemus erikae is named for Erika Costa Elias, wife of Bruno Pimenta, one of the scientists who described the species.

== Description ==
Adult males measure 22–27 mm (0.9–1.1 in) and adult females 19–27 mm (0.7–1.1 in) in snout–vent length. The body is robust. The snout is rounded. The tympanum is weakly distinct. The supratympanic fold runs from the posterior corner of the eye to the shoulder; immediately above it, a more or less weak dorsolateral fold runs to near the inguinal region. The fingers and the toes are long and have neither webbing nor expanded tips. Dorsal skin is warty with scattered short ridges or pairs of well-developed longitudinal ridges. Coloration is variable; preserved specimens may be brown with small black blotches on the dorsum and a black interorbital stripe (weak or absent in some specimens). Coloration may also be cream and light-brown; a white vertebral stripe can be present. Males have a large subgular vocal sac.

== Habitat and conservation ==
Physalaemus erikae have been encountered in temporary ponds in cow pastures at the borders of Atlantic Rain Forest remnants, natural openings inside the forest, and cacao plantations. Males call from pond edges or floating in shallow water. Females have been spotted near ponds or dwelling on forest floor litter.

This terrestrial frog has been found in forests, clearings, forest edges, degraded former forest, pasture, and gardens. It has been recorded in the Serra Bonita Private Reserve of Natural Heritage.
