= Physalaemus orophilus =

Conservation status
- Least Concern (IUCN 3.1)

Scientific classification
- Kingdom: Animalia
- Phylum: Chordata
- Class: Amphibia
- Order: Anura
- Family: Leptodactylidae
- Genus: Physalaemus
- Species: P. orophilus

Binomial name
- Physalaemus orophilus Cassini, Cruz, and Caramaschi, 2010

Species of frog

Physalaemus orophilus is a species of frog in the family Leptodactylidae. It is endemic to Brazil.

== Description ==
The adult male frog measures about 21.1–24.8 mm in snout-vent length and the adult female 25.5–28.1 mm. The adult frog has a black lateral stripe from each eye to the inguinal region and a white one from the edge of the eye to the axilliary region.

== Habitat ==
This frog is found in primary forest and both advanced and new secondary forest. Scientists have found this frog between 800 and 1,300 m (2,600 and 4,300 ft) above sea level.

Some protected areas overlap the frog's known range: Reserva Particular do Patrimônio Natural da Serra do Caraça, APA Nova Era, and APA Pedra Gaforina.

== Reproduction ==
The tadpoles have been found on the bottoms of shallow, temporary ponds with vegetation. These ponds are associated with mountain streams.

== Threats ==
The IUCN classifies this frog as least concern of extinction. In some places, some of the frogs may be in danger from habitat loss associated with large- and small-scale agriculture, silviculture of non-native trees, and pasturage. Fires are often used for these types of land conversion. Subsistence-level wood collection may also be an issue.
