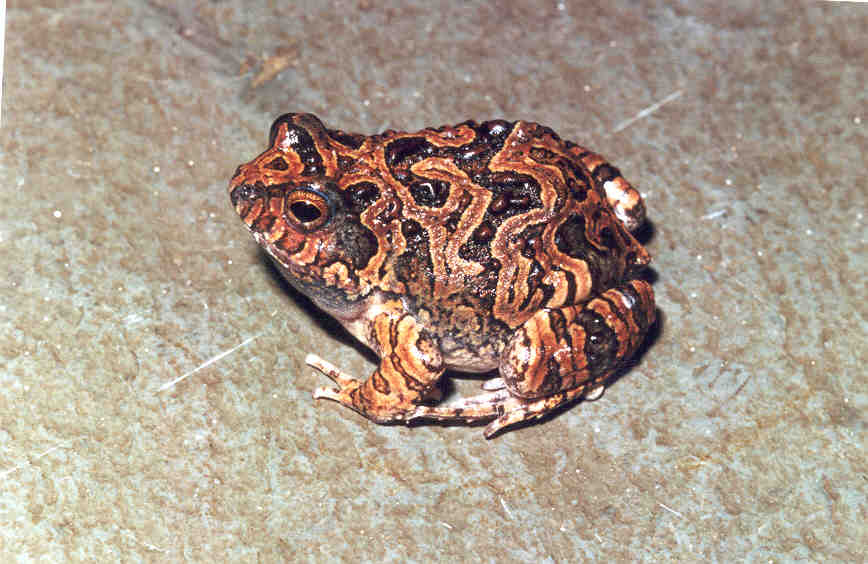

Conservation status
- Least Concern (IUCN 3.1)

Scientific classification
- Kingdom: Animalia
- Phylum: Chordata
- Class: Amphibia
- Order: Anura
- Family: Leptodactylidae
- Genus: Physalaemus
- Species: P. marmoratus

Binomial name
- Physalaemus marmoratus (Reinhardt and Lütken, 1862)

Synonyms
- Gomphobates marmoratus Reinhardt and Lütken, 1862 "1861"; Physalaemus marmoratus Nascimento, Pimenta, Cruz, and Caramaschi, 2006

= Physalaemus marmoratus =

Species of frog

Physalaemus marmoratus, the brown-spotted dwarf frog, is a species of frog in the family Leptodactylidae. It is endemic to Brazil and Paraguay and suspected in Bolivia.

== Habitat ==
This frog lives near ponds in savannahs, but it has also been seen on farms and tree farms.

The frog has been reported in protected places: APA Corumbatai, Botucatu e Tejupa Perimetro Corumbatai, APA da Escarpa Devoniana (Campos Gerais), APA das Nascentes do Rio Vermelho, APA do Planalto Central, APA Morro da Pedreira, PARNA dos Campos Gerais, RPPN Bronzon, and RPPN Olavo Egydio Setubal.

== Reproduction ==
This frog often has young in human-made bodies of water, such as lakes and ponds. It breeds through larval development. The male frogs float on the water and call to the female frogs. During amplexus, the adult frogs make a floating foam nest for the unpigmented eggs.

== Threats ==
The IUCN classifies this frog as least concern of extinction. In some parts of their range, these frogs might be in some danger agriculture, livestock, and logging.
