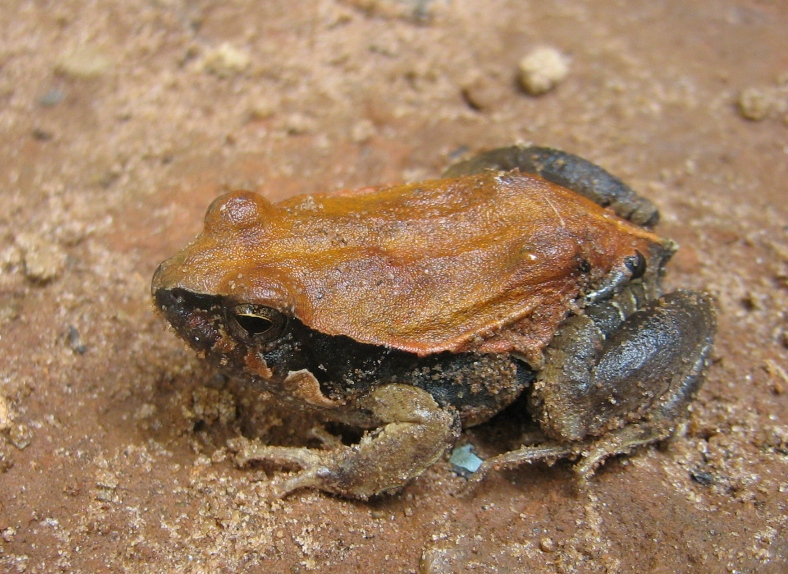

Conservation status
- Least Concern (IUCN 3.1)

Scientific classification
- Kingdom: Animalia
- Phylum: Chordata
- Class: Amphibia
- Order: Anura
- Family: Leptodactylidae
- Genus: Physalaemus
- Species: P. centralis

Binomial name
- Physalaemus centralis Bokermann, 1962

= Physalaemus centralis =

Species of frog

Physalaemus centralis is a species of frog in the family Leptodactylidae. It is found in Bolivia, Brazil, and Paraguay.

== Description ==
The adult frog measures 30 to 40 mm in snout-vent length. The skin of the dorsum can be gray, cream-white, or red in color. Some frogs have an Omega-shaped mark on their backs. The throat is black in color. This species does not display notable sexual dimorphism.

== Habitat ==
The frog is found in forest fragments and open areas in Atlantic forest, Amazon, Pantanal, Cerrado, and Caatinga places. It has not shown tolerance to anthropogenic disturbance. Scientists have seen this frog between 0 and 1,000 m (0 and 3,281 ft) above sea level.

Scientists have seen the frog in protected places: Estacion Biologica Beni, Parque Nacional Noel Kempff, Área Natural de Manejo Integrado San Matías, Área de Preservação Ambiental Corumbatai, Botucatu e Tejupa, APA das Nascentes do Rio Vermelho, APA Ilha do Bananal/Cantao, APA Morro da Pedreira, APA Piracicaba Juqueri Mirim Area I, APA Pouso Alto, Estação Ecológica Serra Geral do Tocantins, Parque Estadual do Jalapao, Parque Nacional da Chapada dos Veadeiros, and Parque Nacional de Sete Cidades.

== Reproduction ==
The adult female frog makes a foam nest for the eggs, which floats on the water or is attached to vegetation. Flies and fly maggots prey on the eggs. The tadpoles are benthic.

At stage 37, the tadpole measures 20 mm. It is mostly brown in color with some blotches and a translucent tail.

== Threats ==
The IUCN classifies this frog as least concern of extinction. In some places, the frogs face habitat loss associated with intensive agriculture and cattle ranching and the fires that people set to convert land for this purpose.
