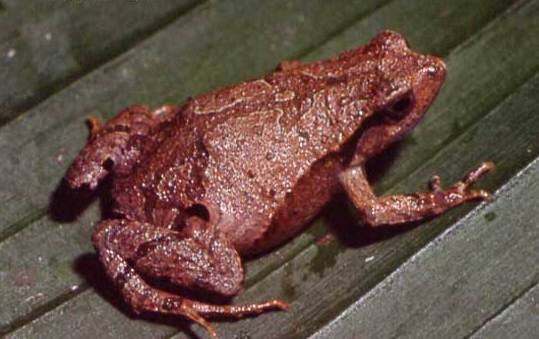

Conservation status
- Least Concern (IUCN 3.1)

Scientific classification
- Kingdom: Animalia
- Phylum: Chordata
- Class: Amphibia
- Order: Anura
- Family: Leptodactylidae
- Genus: Physalaemus
- Species: P. nanus

Binomial name
- Physalaemus nanus (Boulenger, 1888)

= Physalaemus nanus =

Species of frog

Physalaemus nanus is a species of frog in the family Leptodactylidae. It is endemic to Brazil.

== Habitat ==
This frog is found in montane and lowland forests and has been observed in some human-disturbed habitats. Scientists have seen it between 0 and 1,200 m (0 and 3,937 ft) above sea level.

Scientists have reported the frog in many protected areas: Área de Proteção Ambiental do Alto Rio Turvo, Área de Proteção Ambiental São Francisco de Assis, Área de Relevante Interesse Ecológico Serra da Abelha, Parque Estadual Serra Furada, Parque Estadual Tabuleiro, Parque Municipal Morro do Céu, Parque Nacional da Serra do Itajaí, Parque Nacional da Serra Geral, Parque Nacional de Saint-Hilaire-Lange, Parque Nacional dos Campos Gerais, Reserva Biológica do Aguai, Refúgio da Vida Silvestre dos Campos de Palmas, and RPPN Chacara Edith.

== Reproduction ==
The frog reproduces in small, temporary bodies of water. The adult frog makes a foam nest for the eggs that it secures under roots, leaves, or branches near the edge of the water. The young hatch out of eggs as tadpoles, not small froglets.

== Threats ==
The IUCN classifies this species as least concern of extinction. In some parts of the frog's range, it may be in some danger from habitat loss associated with agriculture, cattle grazing, and the fires set for land conversion.
