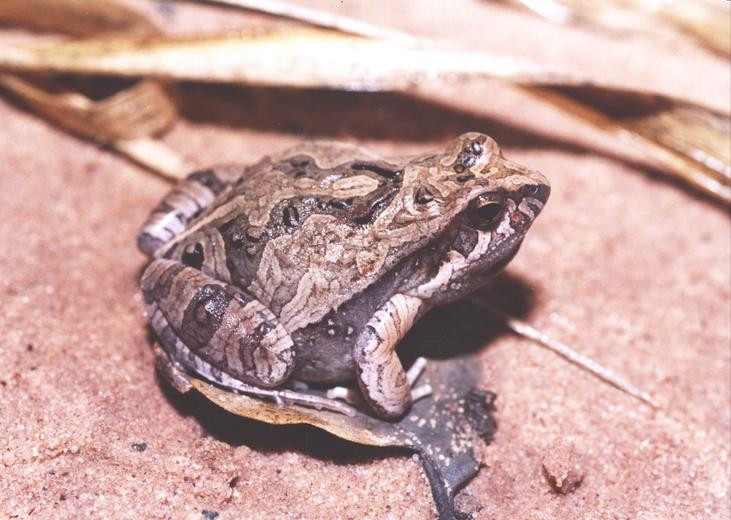
- Physalaemus cuvieri

Scientific classification
- Kingdom: Animalia
- Phylum: Chordata
- Class: Amphibia
- Order: Anura
- Family: Leptodactylidae
- Subfamily: Leiuperinae
- Genus: Physalaemus; Fitzinger, 1826

Type species
- Physalaemus cuvieri Fitzinger, 1826

Diversity
- About 48 species (see text)

Synonyms
- Paludicola Wagler, 1830; Liuperus Cope, 1861 "1860"; Gomphobates Reinhardt and Lütken, 1862 "1861"; Eupemphix Steindachner, 1863; Nattereria Steindachner, 1864

= Physalaemus =

Genus of amphibians

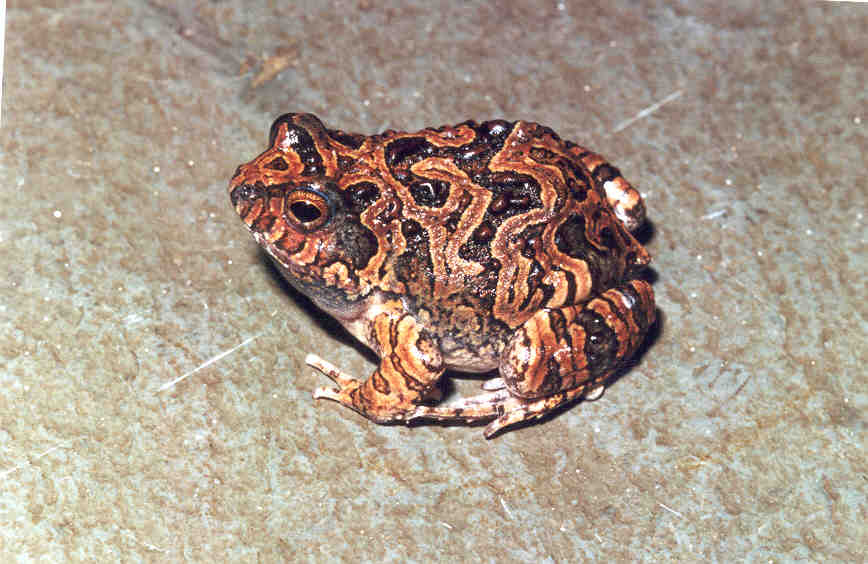
Physalaemus marmoratus

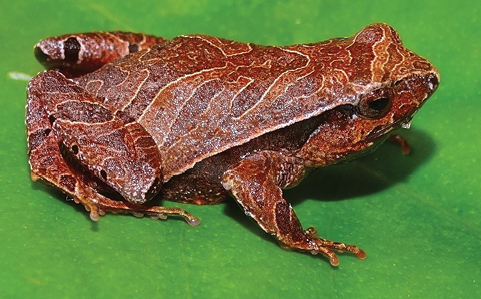
Physalaemus maculiventris

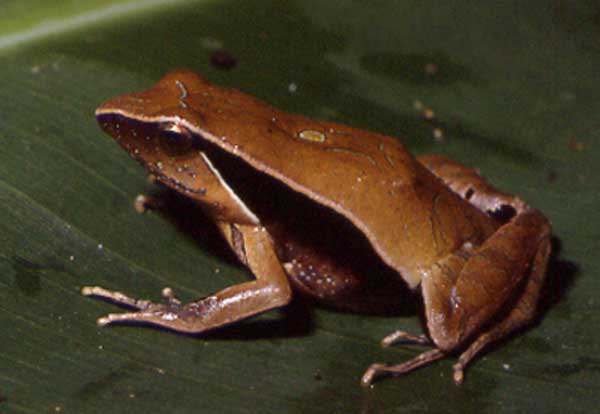
Physalaemus olfersii

Physalaemus is a large genus of leptodactylid frogs. These frogs, sometimes known as dwarf frogs or foam frogs, are found in South America. It is very similar to Leptodactylus, a close relative, and indeed the recently described Leptodactylus lauramiriamae is in some aspects intermediate between them. They have been described by researchers as presenting one of the most puzzling taxonomic histories among Neotropical anurans because of the occurrence of highly polymorphic and cryptic species.

== Species ==
There are 51 or 50 species (AmphibiaWeb lists Physalaemus nattereri as Eupemphix nattereri ):

- Physalaemus aguirrei Bokermann, 1966
- Physalaemus albifrons (Spix, 1824)
- Physalaemus albonotatus (Steindachner, 1864)
- Physalaemus angrensis (Weber, Gonzaga & Carvalho-e-Silva, 2006)
- Physalaemus araxa (Leal et al., 2021)
- Physalaemus atim (Brasileiro & Haddad, 2015)
- Physalaemus atlanticus (Haddad & Sazima, 2004)
- Physalaemus barrioi (Bokermann, 1967)
- Physalaemus biligonigerus (Cope, 1861)
- Physalaemus bokermanni (Cardoso & Haddad, 1985)
- Physalaemus caete (Pombal & Madureira, 1997)
- Physalaemus camacan (Pimenta, Cruz & Silvano, 2005)
- Physalaemus carrizorum (Cardozo & Pereyra, 2018)
- Physalaemus centralis (Bokermann, 1962)
- Physalaemus cicada (Bokermann, 1966)
- Physalaemus claptoni (Leal et al., 2020)
- Physalaemus cristinae (Cardozo et al., 2023)
- Physalaemus crombiei (Heyer & Wolf, 1989)
- Physalaemus cuqui (Lobo, 1993)
- Physalaemus cuvieri (Fitzinger, 1826)
- Physalaemus deimaticus (Sazima & Caramaschi, 1988)
- Physalaemus ephippifer (Steindachner, 1864)
- Physalaemus erikae (Cruz & Pimenta, 2004)
- Physalaemus erythros (Caramaschi, Feio & Guimarães, 2003)
- Physalaemus evangelistai (Bokermann, 1967)
- Physalaemus feioi (Cassini, Cruz & Caramaschi, 2010)
- Physalaemus fernandezae (Müller, 1926)
- Physalaemus fischeri (Boulenger, 1890)
- Physalaemus gracilis (Boulenger, 1883)
- Physalaemus henselii (Peters, 1872)
- Physalaemus insperatus (Cruz, Cassini & Caramaschi, 2008)
- Physalaemus irroratus (Cruz, Nascimento & Feio, 2007)
- Physalaemus jordanensis (Bokermann, 1967)
- Physalaemus kroyeri (Reinhardt & Lütken, 1862)
- Physalaemus lateristriga (Steindachner, 1864)
- Physalaemus lisei (Braun & Braun, 1977)
- Physalaemus maculiventris (Lutz, 1925)
- Physalaemus marmoratus (Reinhardt & Lütken, 1862)
- Physalaemus maximus (Feio, Pombal & Caramaschi, 1999)
- Physalaemus moreirae (Miranda-Ribeiro, 1937)
- Physalaemus nanus (Boulenger, 1888)
- Physalaemus nattereri (Steindachner, 1863)
- Physalaemus obtectus (Bokermann, 1966)
- Physalaemus olfersii (Lichtenstein & Martens, 1856)
- Physalaemus orophilus (Cassini, Cruz & Caramaschi, 2010)
- Physalaemus riograndensis (Milstead, 1960)
- Physalaemus rupestris (Caramaschi, Carcerelli & Feio, 1991)
- Physalaemus santafecinus (Barrio, 1965)
- Physalaemus signifer (Girard, 1853)
- Physalaemus soaresi (Izecksohn, 1965)
- Physalaemus spiniger (Miranda-Ribeiro, 1926)
