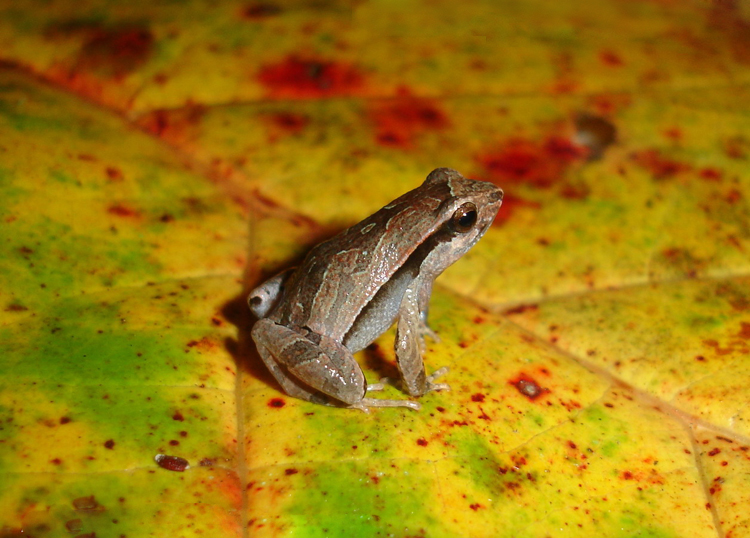

Conservation status
- Least Concern (IUCN 3.1)

Scientific classification
- Kingdom: Animalia
- Phylum: Chordata
- Class: Amphibia
- Order: Anura
- Family: Leptodactylidae
- Genus: Physalaemus
- Species: P. spiniger

Binomial name
- Physalaemus spiniger (Miranda-Ribeiro, 1926)
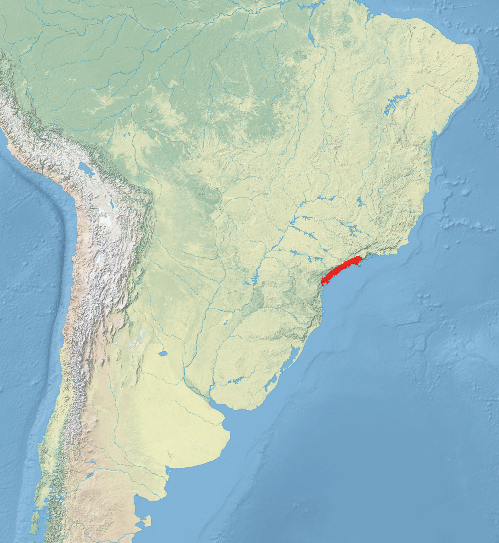

Synonyms
- Engystomops spinigera Miranda-Ribeiro, 1926; Physalaemus spiniger Haddad and Pombal, 1998; Eupemphix spiniger Dubois, Ohler, and Pyron, 2021

= Physalaemus spiniger =

Species of frog

Physalaemus spiniger is a species of frog in the family Leptodactylidae. It is endemic to Brazil.

== Habitat ==
This frog lives in lowland and montane forests and at the edges of forests and in coastal scrubland. Scientists have reported it between 0 and 800 m (0 and 2,625 ft) above sea level and in protected areas.

== Reproduction ==
The male frogs sit near ponds and flooded areas and call to the female frogs. The adult frog makes a foam nest for the eggs, which can be placed on the surface, on the bottom, or in the leaf litter. This species breeds through larval development.

== Threats ==
The IUCN classifies this frog as least concern of extinction. The frog's range contains large swaths of suitable habitat. Some of the frogs may be in some danger from habitat degradation and fragmentation associated with deforestation, urbanization, both small-scale and cash-crop farming, and cattle grazing. Logging was once also a significant threat, but now most wood extraction is small scale.
