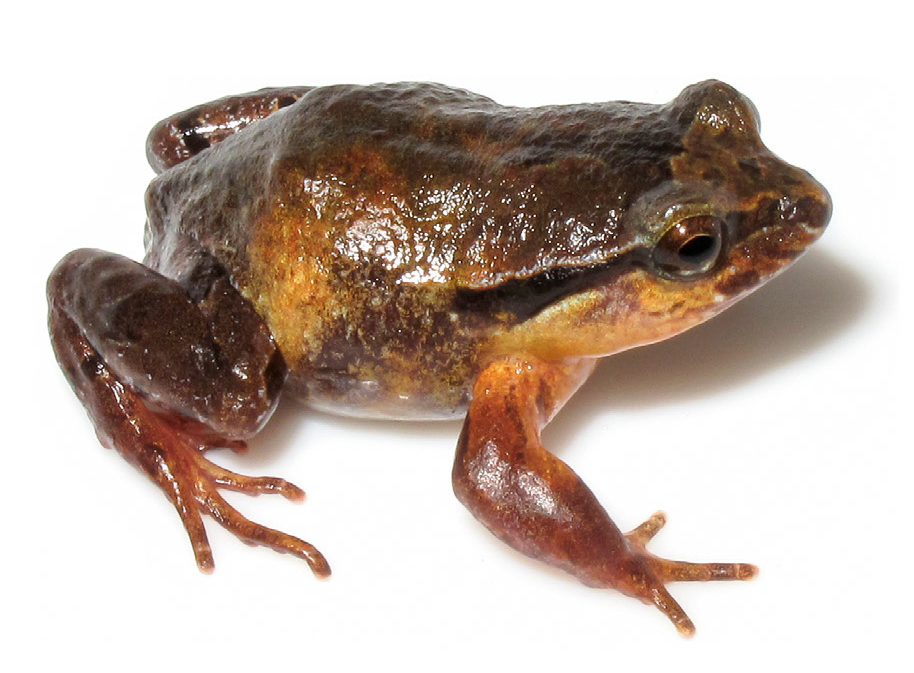

Conservation status
- Endangered (IUCN 3.1)

Scientific classification
- Kingdom: Animalia
- Phylum: Chordata
- Class: Amphibia
- Order: Anura
- Family: Leptodactylidae
- Genus: Physalaemus
- Species: P. araxa

Binomial name
- Physalaemus araxa Leal, Zornosa-Torres, Augusto-Alves, Dena, Pezzuti, Leite, Lourenço, Garcia, and Toledo, 2021

= Physalaemus araxa =

Species of frog

Physalaemus araxa is a species of frog in the family Leptodactylidae. It is endemic to Brazil.

== Habitat ==
This frog lives in mountaintop areas in Brazil's Atlantic forest biome. Scientists found the frog in Caparaó National Park, a protected place.

== Threats ==
The scientists who wrote the first formal description of this species believe it should be considered endangered because of the extreme weather in its habitat, both fire and frost, and the inconsistency of the government regarding environmental protection.
