= Physalaemus soaresi =

Conservation status
- Critically Endangered (IUCN 3.1)

Scientific classification
- Kingdom: Animalia
- Phylum: Chordata
- Class: Amphibia
- Order: Anura
- Family: Leptodactylidae
- Genus: Physalaemus
- Species: P. soaresi

Binomial name
- Physalaemus soaresi Izecksohn, 1965

Species of frog

Physalaemus soaresi is a species of frog in the family Leptodactylidae. It is endemic to southeastern Brazil where it is only known from three localities in the Rio de Janeiro state, one of them lost to urbanization and habitat degradation.

== Habitat ==
Scientists believe the frog once lived in primary forests but it is currently only found in secondary forest. This is likely because all the old-growth forests in the frog's range have been removed. This frog is found on the leaf litter near water with vegetation nearby. Scientists have seen this frog between 0 and 130 m (0 and 427 ft) above sea level.

Scientists have reported the frog in protected places: Floresta Nacional Mario Xavier and the Parque Estadual do Mendanha.

== Reproduction ==
This frog has young by larval development in temporary bodies of water. The adult frog makes a foam nest for the eggs.

== Threats ==
The IUCN classifies this frog as critically endangered. This part of Brazil was subject to extensive forest conversion through logging, urbanization of Rio de Janeiro, agriculture, and cattle ranching. Some of the places where the frog once lived, such as the Barro Branco wetlands, have none of these frogs living there now.

One of the protected places where the frog lives, Floresta Nacional Mario Xavier, is a national forest. This means that even though there is no logging activity now and has not been for about forty years, logging could legally resume at some point.
