= Physalaemus atim =

Conservation status
- Least Concern (IUCN 3.1)

Scientific classification
- Kingdom: Animalia
- Phylum: Chordata
- Class: Amphibia
- Order: Anura
- Family: Leptodactylidae
- Genus: Physalaemus
- Species: P. atim

Binomial name
- Physalaemus atim Brasileiro and Haddad, 2015

Species of frog

Physalaemus atim is a species of frog in the family Leptodactylidae. It is endemic to Brazil.

== Description ==
The adult male frog measures 28.2–30.1 millimetres (1.11–1.19 in) in snout-vent length and the adult female frog 26.0–30.5 mm (1.02–1.20 in). The skin of the dorsum is brown with darker brown blotches. There are black stripes on the sides of the body and dark brown stripes on all four legs. All four feet are white in color. There are light dots on the chest. Male frogs have dark-colored gular areas and female frogs do not.

== Etymology ==
Scientists named the frog atim because it means "big nose" in the Tupi language. The Tupi are indigenous people who live in the area.

== Habitat ==
This frog has been found in forests and savannah in Brazil's Cerrado biome and in modified habitat such as pasture and low-intensity farms.

Scientists have reported the frog in some protected places Reserva Ecológica da Universidade Estadual de Goiás and Parque Estadual Altamiro de Moura Pacheco.

== Reproduction ==
This frog reproduces during the dry season. This frog lays eggs in marshes. The frog lays eggs in foam nests that float on the water. The tadpoles develop in the water.

== Threats ==
The IUCN classifies this frog as least concern of extinction. The area has undergone extensive modification, but the frog has shown tolerance. In some areas, the conversion of pasture and low-intensity farmland to soybean monoculture may pose some threat.
