= Physalaemus santafecinus =

Conservation status
- Least Concern (IUCN 3.1)

Scientific classification
- Kingdom: Animalia
- Phylum: Chordata
- Class: Amphibia
- Order: Anura
- Family: Leptodactylidae
- Genus: Physalaemus
- Species: P. santafecinus

Binomial name
- Physalaemus santafecinus Barrio, 1965

Species of frog

Physalaemus santafecinus is a species of frog in the family Leptodactylidae. It is found in Argentina and Paraguay. It is called Helvetia dwarf frog and Santa Fe dwarf frog in English.

== Description ==
The adult frog is about 34 mm long snout-vent length.

== Habitat ==
This frog is found in seasonally flooded wetlands. In dry times, the frog remains underground. This frog has been observed in farmland and urbanized areas so long as there is space for the frog to burrow. Scientists have seen this frog between 30 and 60 m (98 and 197 ft) above sea level.

Scientists have reported the frog in protected places: Funkanigas RAMSAR site, Mburucuyá National Park, and Iberá Provincial Reserve.

== Reproduction ==
At stage 38, the tadpole measures 24 mm in snout-vent length. The tail is about twice as long as the body. The tadpole has a round snout.

== Threats ==
The IUCN classifies this frog as least concern of extinction. The frogs may be in some danger from pollution and farms.
