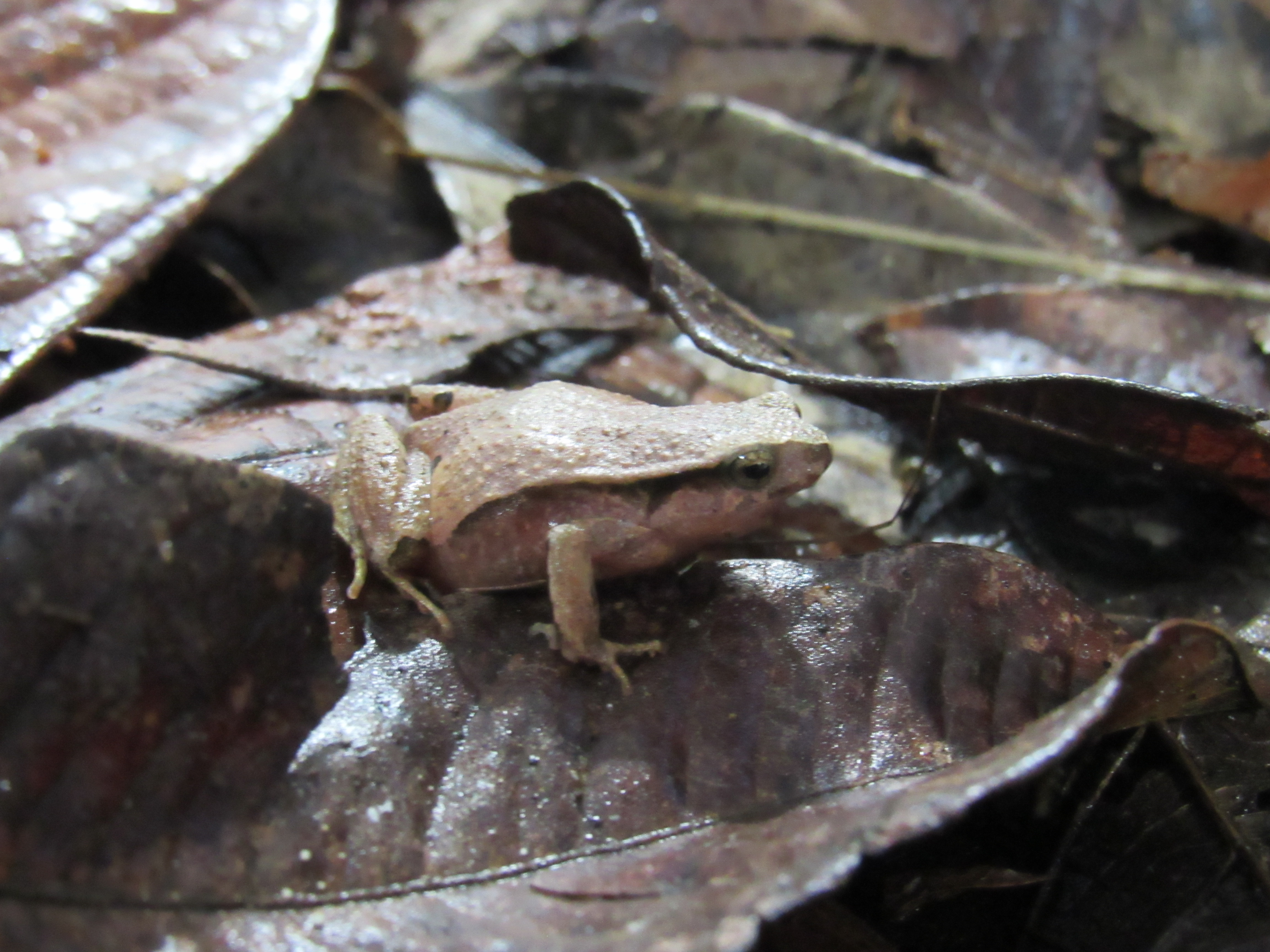

Conservation status
- Least Concern (IUCN 3.1)

Scientific classification
- Kingdom: Animalia
- Phylum: Chordata
- Class: Amphibia
- Order: Anura
- Family: Leptodactylidae
- Genus: Physalaemus
- Species: P. crombiei

Binomial name
- Physalaemus crombiei Heyer & Wolf, 1989

= Physalaemus crombiei =

Species of frog

Physalaemus crombiei is a species of frog in the family Leptodactylidae. It is endemic to Brazil.

== Habitat ==
The frog lives in primary and secondary forest but it is exclusively reported in forest habitats. It is found in the leaf litter. Scientists have seen this frog between 0 and 750 m (0 and 2,461 ft) above sea level.

Scientists have reproted the frog in some protected places, including Reserva Biológica Nova Lombardia.

== Reproduction ==
This frog lays eggs in nests made out of bubbles. The tadpoles develop in water.

== Threats ==
The IUCN classifies this frog as least concern of extinction. What threat it faces comes from deforestation associated with urban expansion, small- and large-scale agriculture, silviculture, and livestock grazing.
