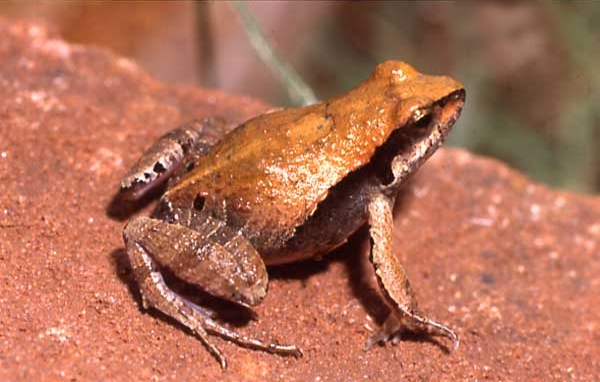

Conservation status
- Least Concern (IUCN 3.1)

Scientific classification
- Kingdom: Animalia
- Phylum: Chordata
- Class: Amphibia
- Order: Anura
- Family: Leptodactylidae
- Genus: Physalaemus
- Species: P. gracilis

Binomial name
- Physalaemus gracilis (Boulenger, 1883)

Synonyms
- Paludicola gracilis Boulenger, 1883; Liuperus calcaratus Philippi, 1902; Paludicola ranina Cope, 1885; Pleurodema montevidense Philippi, 1902

= Physalaemus gracilis =

Species of frog

Physalaemus gracilis is a species of frog in the family Leptodactylidae. It is found in southern Brazil, Uruguay, and adjacent Argentina and suspected in Paraguay.

== Habitat ==
This frog lives near the edges of forests and in Cerrado grasslands. Scientists have seen it between 0 and 1,200 m (0 and 3,937 ft) above sea level. Scientists have seen the frog in protected areas.

== Reproduction ==
These frogs reproduce by larval development in natural, temporary pools of water. Scientists have noted that the female frogs in Uruguay produce more eggs per individual than their counterparts in Brazil.

== Threats ==
The IUCN classifies this species as least concern of extinction. This frog has shown some tolerance to polluted habitats.
