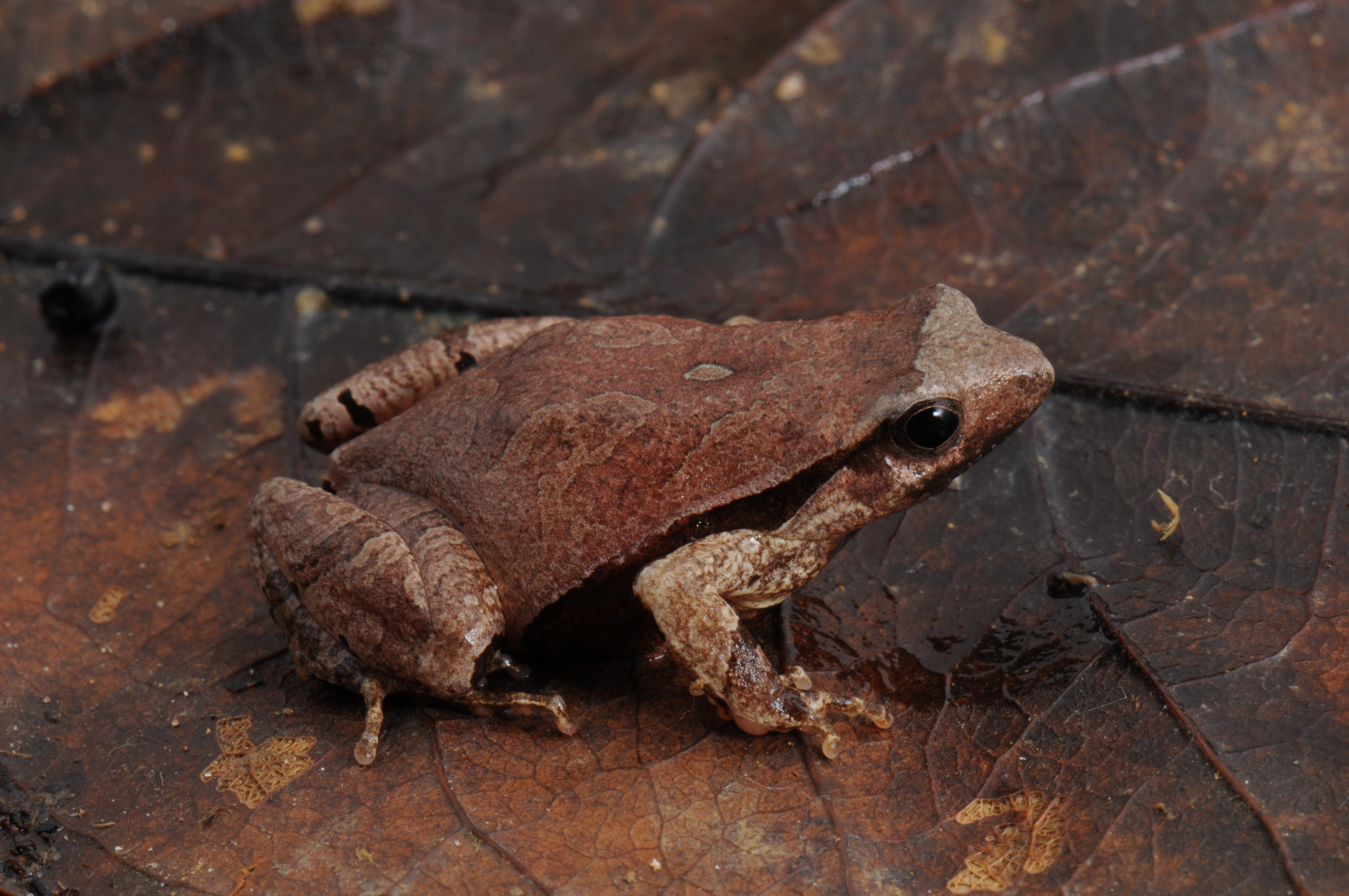

Conservation status
- Least Concern (IUCN 3.1)

Scientific classification
- Kingdom: Animalia
- Phylum: Chordata
- Class: Amphibia
- Order: Anura
- Family: Leptodactylidae
- Genus: Physalaemus
- Species: P. signifer

Binomial name
- Physalaemus signifer (Girard, 1853)

Synonyms
- Rhinoderma signifera Girard, 1853; Phyllobates glandulosus Steindachner, 1867; Paludicola signifera Boulenger, 1891; Paludicola signifer Baumann, 1912; Paludicola bresslaui Müller, 1924; Physalaemus bresslaui Parker, 1927; Physalaemus signiferus Cochran, 1955 "1954"; Physalaemus signifer Cannatella, 1985; Eupemphix signifer Dubois, Ohler, and Pyron, 2021

= Physalaemus signifer =

Species of frog

Physalaemus signifer is a species of frog in the family Leptodactylidae. It is endemic to Brazil.

== Habitat ==
This frog is an obligate forest dweller. It has been found in flooded areas and in and near ponds within and near the edges of primary and secondary forest. Scientists have seen it between 0 and 1,200 m (0 and 3,937 ft) above sea level. It has been reported in protected places.

== Reproduction ==
These frogs reproduce in temporary and permanent ponds and in nearby mud or leaf litter. The adult frog makes a foam nest for the eggs. The tadpoles develop in the ponds.

== Threats ==
The IUCN classifies this frog as least concern of extinction. Its principal threat is forest loss associated with urbanization, small- and large-scale acrigulture, silviculture, and livestock grazing.
