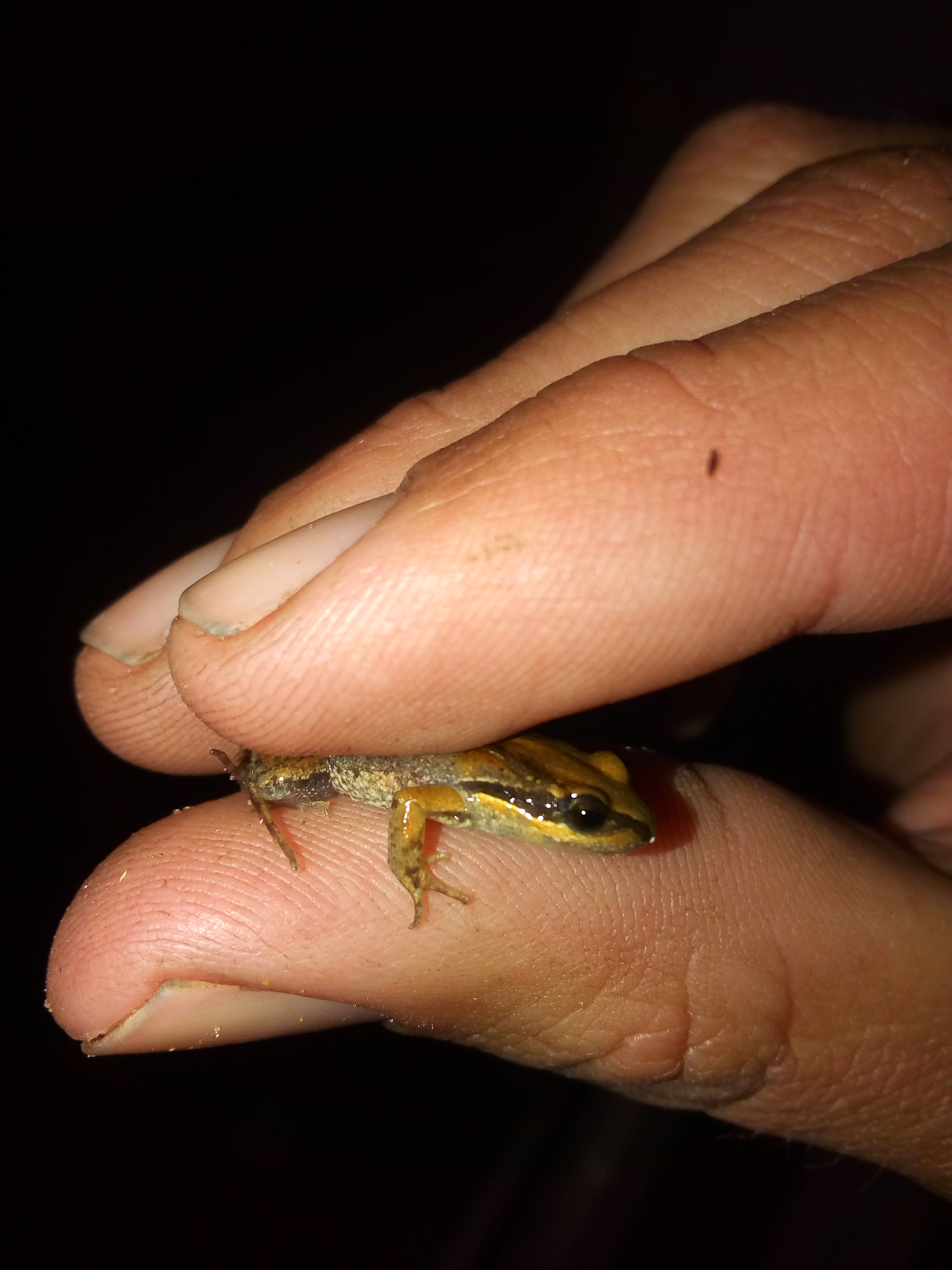

Conservation status
- Least Concern (IUCN 3.1)

Scientific classification
- Kingdom: Animalia
- Phylum: Chordata
- Class: Amphibia
- Order: Anura
- Family: Leptodactylidae
- Genus: Physalaemus
- Species: P. fernandezae

Binomial name
- Physalaemus fernandezae (Müller, 1926)
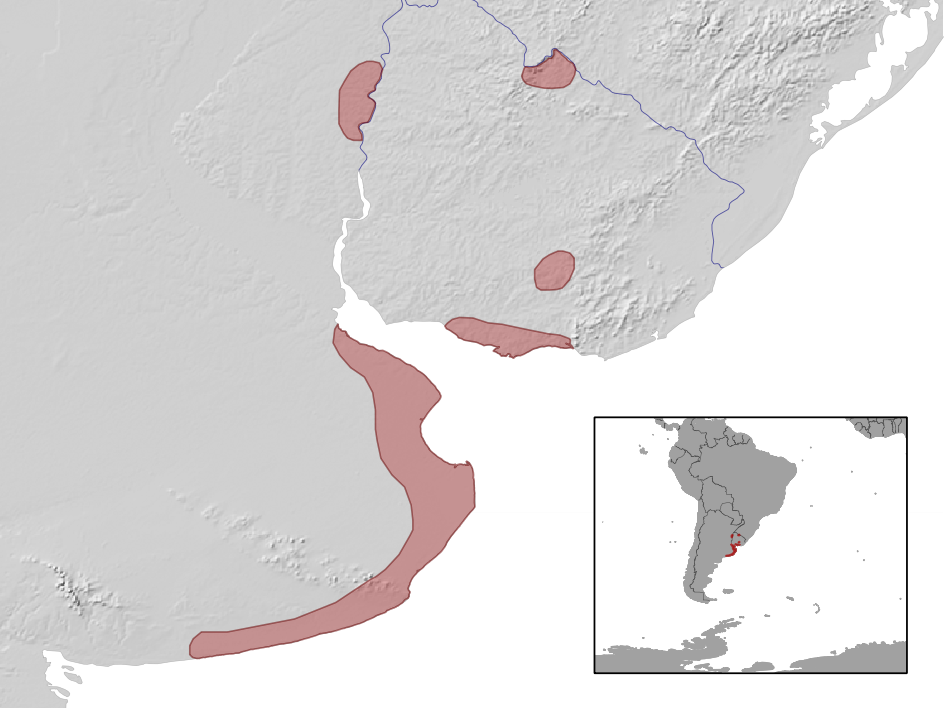

Synonyms
- Paludicola fernandezae Müller, 1926; Physalaemus barbouri Parker, 1927; Physalaemus fernandezae Parker, 1927

= Physalaemus fernandezae =

Species of frog

Physalaemus fernandezae is a species of frog in the family Leptodactylidae. It is found in Argentina and Uruguay.

== Habitat ==
This frog is found in seasonally flooded grassland and in rocky places near rivers. During the hotter and drier months of the year, it can be found hiding among leaves or in cracks in the soil. It is not clear whether this frog tolerates anthropogenic disturbance or how much. Scientists have seen this frog between 0 and 100 m (0 and 328 ft) above sea level.

Scientists have reported the frog in protected places: Reserva Natural Punta Lara and Área Protegida con Recursos Manejados Humedales del Santa Lucía.

== Reproduction ==
The two adult frogs make a nest out of bubbles for the eggs.

== Threats ==
The IUCN classifies this species as least concern of extinction. However, the frogs face some threat from soil and water pollution from agriculture, industry, and human habitation. There is also a threat from conversion of its habitat to various monoculture operations.

Scientists have found the fungus Batrachochytrium dendrobatidis on some of the frogs in Argentina, but they did not observe any frogs that had died of the disease it causes, chytridiomycosis.
