= Physalaemus feioi =

Conservation status
- Least Concern (IUCN 3.1)

Scientific classification
- Kingdom: Animalia
- Phylum: Chordata
- Class: Amphibia
- Order: Anura
- Family: Leptodactylidae
- Genus: Physalaemus
- Species: P. feioi

Binomial name
- Physalaemus feioi Cassini, Cruz, and Caramaschi, 2010

Species of frog

Physalaemus feioi is a species of frog in the family Leptodactylidae. It is found in Brazil.

== Description ==
The adult male frog measures about 21.2–29.2 mm in snout-vent length and the adult female frog 23.5–31.2 mm. The skin of the dorsum can be gray or brown in color. Parts of the skin are brown with light spots. The adult frog has a black stripe from each eye to the inguinal region. There is a white line from each eye to the axilla. The gular area is light gray with white pots. Parts of the belly are gray with white spots. Other parts of the belly are light brown. Some parts of the feet and belly are red in color.

== Habitat ==
This frog is found in primary and secondary forest. People see it near pools of water, marshes, or on the ground in the forest. Scientists have seen this frog between 397 and 1,234 m (1,302 and 4,049 ft) above sea level.

The frog's known range overlap some protected places.

== Reproduction ==
The free-swimming tadpoles develop in pools.

== Threats ==
The IUCN classifies this frog as least concern of extinction. In some parts if the species' range, some subpopulations may be in some danger from habitat loss associated with urbanization, agriculture, silviculture, and cattle pasturage. The area was once subject to large-scale logging, but this has mostly subsided in favor of small-scale wood harvesting.
