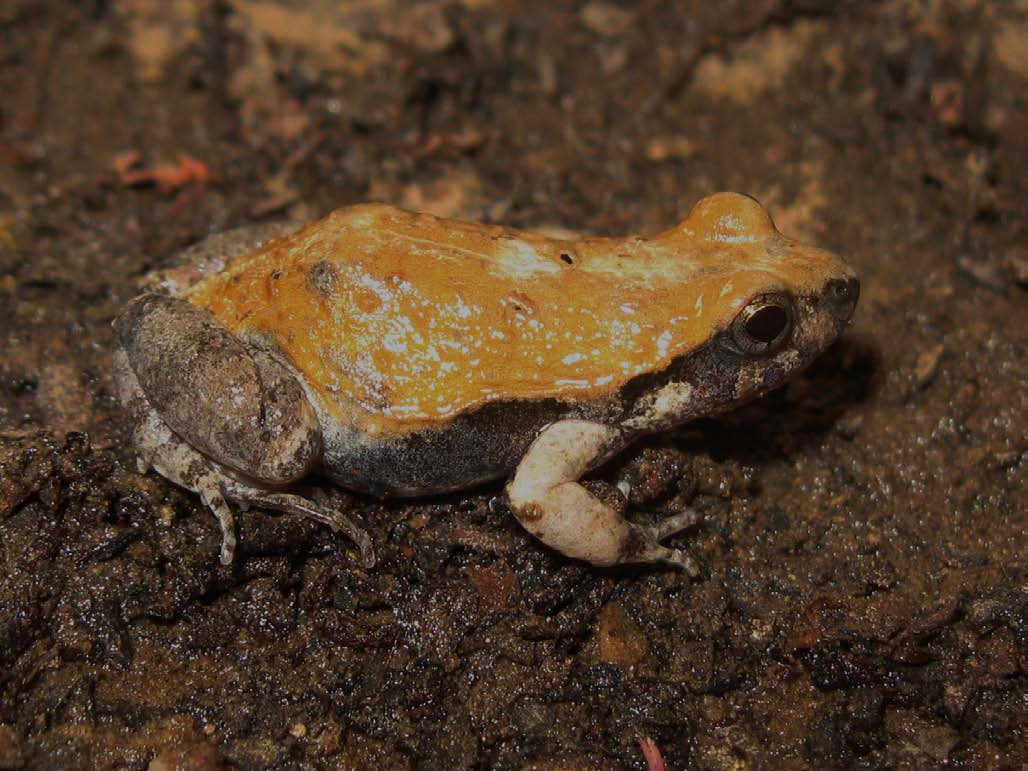

Conservation status
- Least Concern (IUCN 3.1)

Scientific classification
- Kingdom: Animalia
- Phylum: Chordata
- Class: Amphibia
- Order: Anura
- Family: Leptodactylidae
- Genus: Physalaemus
- Species: P. cicada

Binomial name
- Physalaemus cicada Bokermann, 1966
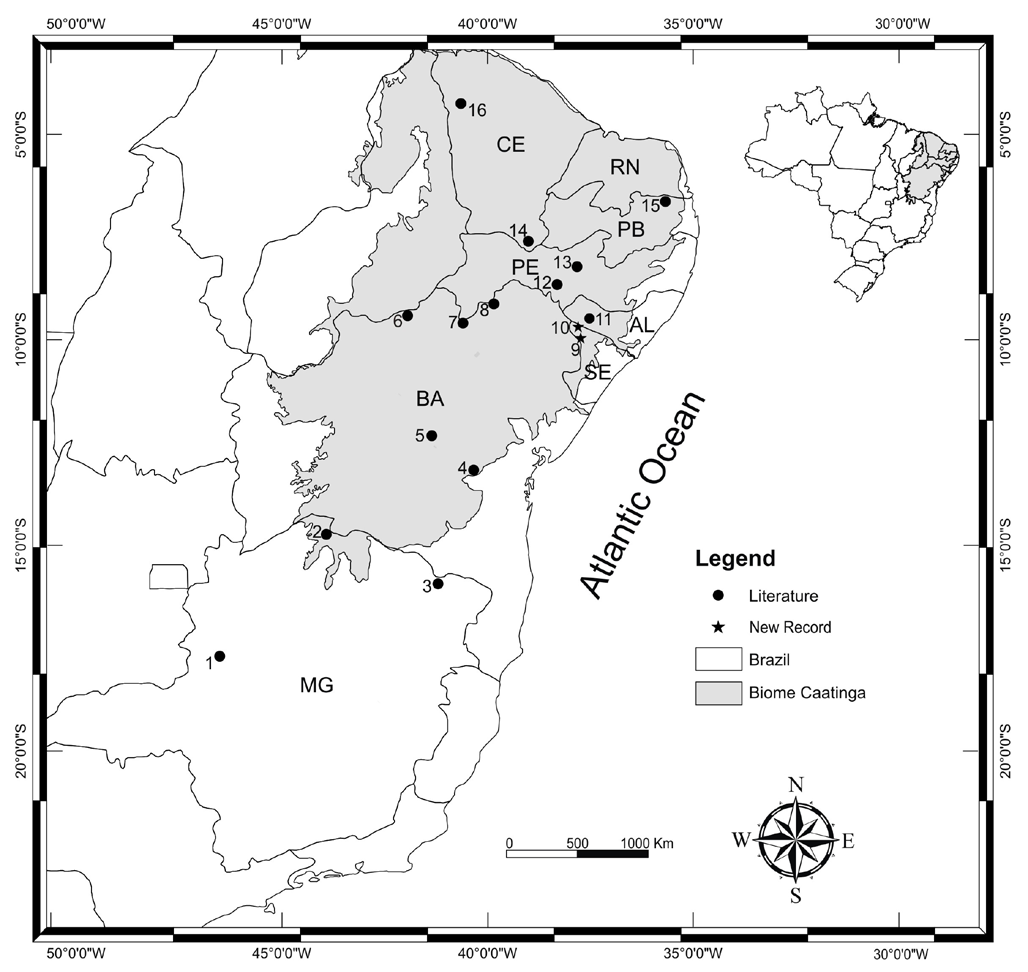

= Physalaemus cicada =

Species of frog

Physalaemus cicada is a species of frog in the family Leptodactylidae. It is endemic to Brazil.

== Home ==
This frog is largely terrestrial, found near water in Caatinga biomes. Scientists have seen this frog 200 m (660 ft) above sea level and have reported it in protected places.

== Reproduction ==
Scientists believe the adult frog makes a foam nest for its eggs and that the eggs hatch into tadpoles rather than froglets. The male frog sits in the water, next to the water, or on vegetation. The tadpoles are nocturnal and benthic, living in shallow water with vegetation.

== Threats ==
The IUCN classifies this frog as least concern of extinction. Some parts of the population might be in some danger from habitat loss associated with agriculture and livestock cultivation.
