= Physalaemus jordanensis =

Conservation status
- Least Concern (IUCN 3.1)

Scientific classification
- Kingdom: Animalia
- Phylum: Chordata
- Class: Amphibia
- Order: Anura
- Family: Leptodactylidae
- Genus: Physalaemus
- Species: P. jordanensis

Binomial name
- Physalaemus jordanensis Bokermann, 1967

Species of frog

Physalaemus jordanensis is a species of frog in the family Leptodactylidae. It is endemic to Brazil.

== Description ==
The adult male frog measures 24 mm in snout-vent length. It has a long body and slender head. The skin of the dorsum is light brown with some yellow near the backbone. The ventrum has black marks on it.

== Habitat ==
This terrestrial frog lives in savannah and other grasslands and in secondary forest in Brazil's Atlantic forest biome. It tends to be found near water. Scientists have seen this frog between 1,650 and 2,350 m (5,410 and 7,710 ft) above sea level.

Scientists have reported the frog in one protected place, Parque Estadual Serra Do Papagaio, and they suspect it in Parque Nacional do Itatiaia and Parque Estadual de Campos do Jordão.

== Reproduction ==
The male frog calls to the female frogs at night. The adult frog makes a foam nest that floats on the water. The eggs hatch into tadpoles, not froglets. The tadpoles have oval-shaped bodies and rounded snouts.

== Threats ==
The IUCN classifies this frog as least concern of extinction. Some parts of the population may be in some danger from habitat loss associated with agriculture, silviculture, and cattle grazing.
