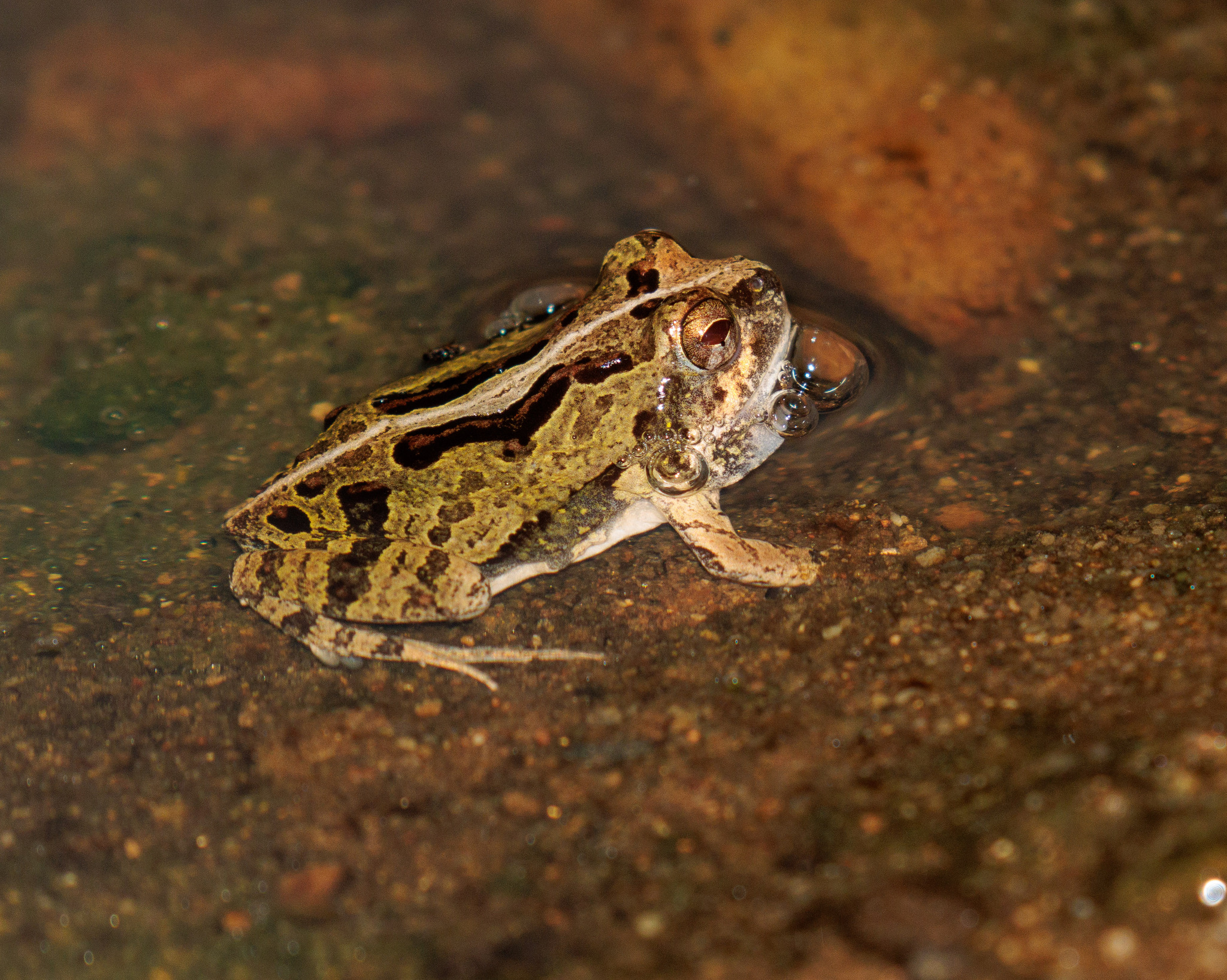

Conservation status
- Least Concern (IUCN 3.1)

Scientific classification
- Kingdom: Animalia
- Phylum: Chordata
- Class: Amphibia
- Order: Anura
- Family: Leptodactylidae
- Genus: Physalaemus
- Species: P. albifrons

Binomial name
- Physalaemus albifrons (Spix, 1824)

Synonyms
- Bufo albifrons Spix, 1824; Bombinator albifrons Schlegel, 1826; Paludicola albifrons Wagler, 1830; Physalaemus albifrons Parker, 1927

= Physalaemus albifrons =

Species of frog

Physalaemus albifrons, also known as Bahia dwarf frog, is a species of frog in the family Leptodactylidae. It is endemic to Brazil.

== Habitat ==
This frog lives in Cerrado, Caatinga, and Restinga biomes. It does not live in forests. People have seen the frogs on the ground near ponds or in water. This frog has shown considerable tolerance to anthropogenic disturbance. Scientists have reported it between 0 and 1,100 m (0 and 3,609 ft) above sea level and in protected places.

== Reproduction ==
These frogs reproduce in temporary ponds. The young hatch as tadpoles, not small froglets.

== Threats ==
The IUCN classifies this frog as least concern of extinction. Some subpopulations may be in danger from habitat loss associated with grazing and fires.
