= Physalaemus claptoni =

Conservation status
- Data Deficient (IUCN 3.1)

Scientific classification
- Kingdom: Animalia
- Phylum: Chordata
- Class: Amphibia
- Order: Anura
- Family: Leptodactylidae
- Genus: Physalaemus
- Species: P. claptoni

Binomial name
- Physalaemus claptoni Leal, Leite, Costa, Nascimento, Lourenço, and Garcia, 2020

Species of frog

Physalaemus claptoni is a species of frog in the family Leptodactylidae. It has been found in Brazil.

== Habitat ==
Scientists know this frog exclusively from the type locality, a steep dry savannah in Brazil's Cerrado biome, about 1,321 m (4,334 ft) above sea level. This place is not in a protected area. Parque Estadual Serra Do Intendente is about 5 km away, but the park has only a few habitats suitable for the frog, and it has not yet been reported there.

== Reproduction ==
The male frogs sit in dense grass. The frogs breed in small pools of water. Scientists infer that this frog reproduces in the same manner as its congeners: The adult lays eggs in a foam nest and the free-swimming tadpoles develop in the water.

== Threats ==
The IUCN classifies this species as data deficient. There is some livestock grazing by the type locality, and people set fires to maintain the pastures. There are a few forests and tree farms nearby. Because the area is so steep, scientists do not think people will engage in much further land conversion.

== Original description ==
- Leal F; Leite FSF; Da Costa WP; Nascimento LB; Lourenço LB; Garcia PCA. (2020). "Amphibians from Serra do Cipó, Minas Gerais, Brasil. VI: A new species of the Physalemus deimaticus group (Anura, Leptodactylidae)". Zootaxa. 4766: 306–330.
