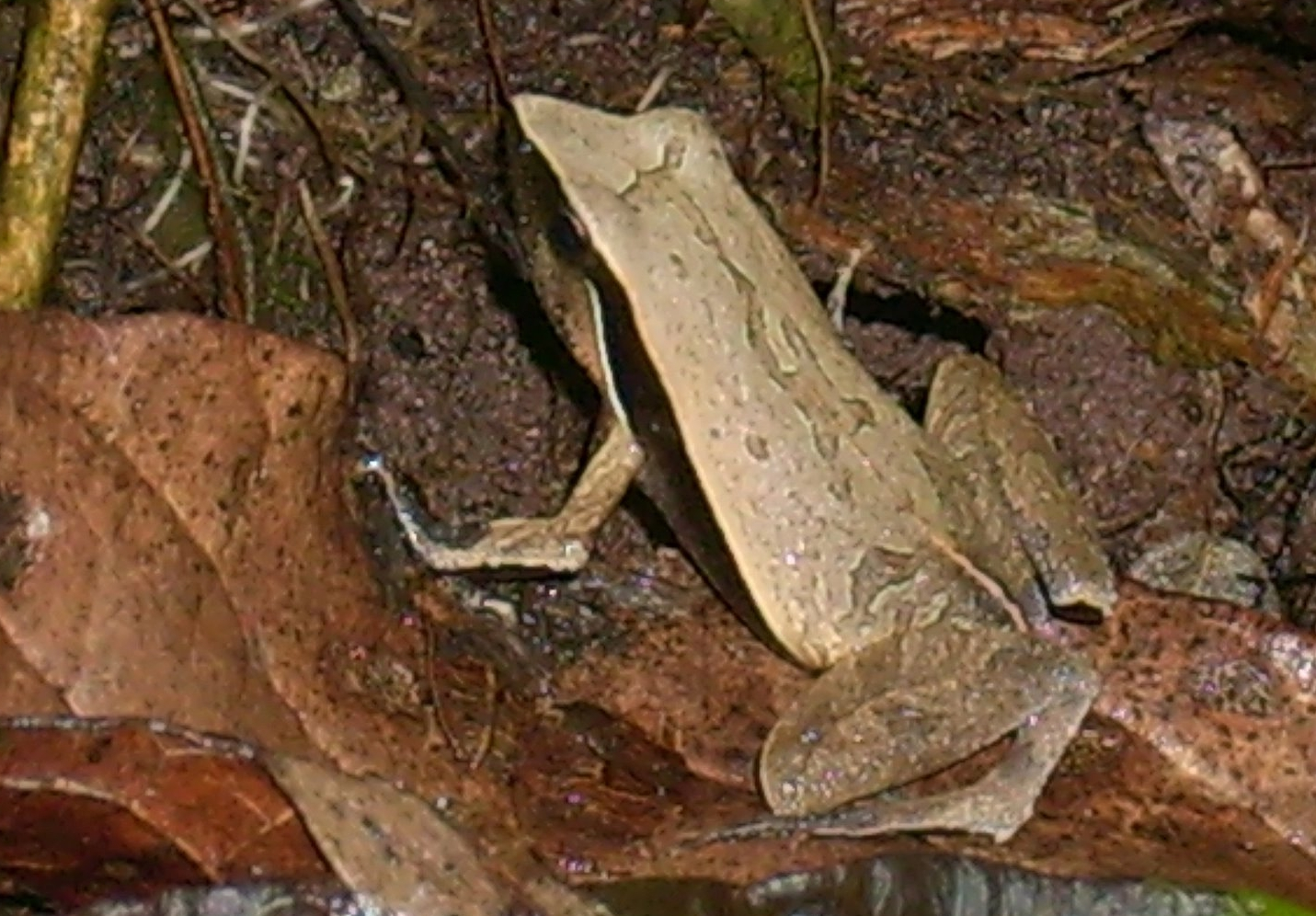

Conservation status
- Least Concern (IUCN 3.1)

Scientific classification
- Kingdom: Animalia
- Phylum: Chordata
- Class: Amphibia
- Order: Anura
- Family: Leptodactylidae
- Genus: Physalaemus
- Species: P. albonotatus

Binomial name
- Physalaemus albonotatus (Steindachner, 1864)

Synonyms
- Leiuperus albonotatus Steindachner, 1864

= Physalaemus albonotatus =

Species of frog

Physalaemus albonotatus, commonly known as the menwig frog, is a species of frog in the family Leptodactylidae. It is found in Brazil (Mato Grosso and Mato Grosso do Sul states), Paraguay, Chacoan Argentina and Bolivia. Their prey consists of mainly arthropods and gastropods. However, their diet shifts depending on prey availability. These frog have glands in their skin that secrete a thick poisonous substance.

== Habitat ==
Physalaemus albonotatus occurs on the ground near semi-permanent or temporary water bodies or flooded grasslands, its breeding habitat; it also breeds in temperate ponds and roadside ditches. In Brazil, it has been observed in Amazon, Pantanal, and Cerrado biomes. Scientists have seen it as high as 1,200 m (3,900 ft) above sea level.

There are several protected areas in and near the frog's habitat: Parque Nacional da Serra da Bodoquena, Parque Nacional da Chapada dos Guimarães, Parque Nacional do Pantanal, and Estação Ecológica Serra das Araras.

== Threats ==
The IUCN classifies this species as least concern of extinction. It adapts very well to human disturbance and to pollution.

== Larval stage ==
The tadpole of Physalaemus albonotatus has an oval body shape with a rounded snout. Its eyes are located on the top of the head with the nostrils placed closer to the eyes than to the snout. The tail is approximately two thirds of the total body length with the maximum tail height being less than the body height, the tip of the tail is rounded. Tadpoles eat algae, diatoms, Cladocera (water fleas), and organic matter in the sediment. Menwig frogs lay their eggs in puddles after a strong rain. The spawn spend the entire larval stage in these puddles. Both the depth and surface area of the puddle effect the growth and development of the tadpoles.

== Reproduction ==
A study in Bodoquena (in the Mato Grosso do Sul state of southwestern Brazil) found Physalaemus albonotatus to be a continuous breeder, breeding throughout the wet season. A different study notes that while these frogs breed throughout the wet season there are two large reproductive events, one in the spring and one in the summer. During these times the majority of reproductive activity takes place. Males called for females from the margins of ponds and flooded area, hiding in vegetation or in small depressions such as footprints. Mean clutch size was about 1500 eggs. Females were similar in size to males; females had a mean snout–vent length of 30.2 mm (1.19 in) (range 26–34 mm) and mean body mass of 2.2 g. The same measurements were 29.7 mm (1.17 in) (range 27–32 mm) and 2.4 g for males. Ovaries made about 27% of female body mass; fecundity increased with the female body size.

== Taxonomy ==
The holotype of this species was lost, and given the difficult nature of the Physalaemus cuvieri group and the extremely similar species, it was redescribed in 2023 and given a neotype.
