= Physalaemus erythros =

Conservation status
- Near Threatened (IUCN 3.1)

Scientific classification
- Kingdom: Animalia
- Phylum: Chordata
- Class: Amphibia
- Order: Anura
- Family: Leptodactylidae
- Genus: Physalaemus
- Species: P. erythros

Binomial name
- Physalaemus erythros Caramaschi, Feio & Guimarães-Neto, 2003

Species of frog

Physalaemus erythros is a species of frog in the family Leptodactylidae. It is endemic to Brazil.

== Habitat ==
This frog inhabits campos rupuestres in the ecotone between the Atlantic Forest and Cerrado biomes. Scientists have seen this frog between 1,600 and 1,676 m (5,249 and 5,499 ft) above sea level.

Scientists have reported the frog in protected places: Área de Proteção Especial Ouro Preto/Mariana and Parque Estadual do Itacolomi. it is suspected in Parque Nacional da Serra do Gandarela.

== Reproduction ==
This frog lays eggs in foam nests, which float on the water. The tadpoles develop in the water.

== Threats ==
The IUCN classifies this frog as near threatened. The frog is in some danger from farms and fires. Because the frog only lives in parts of the campos rupuestres with specific humidity levels, climate change could pose a threat as well.
