= Physalaemus rupestris =

Conservation status
- Endangered (IUCN 3.1)

Scientific classification
- Kingdom: Animalia
- Phylum: Chordata
- Class: Amphibia
- Order: Anura
- Family: Leptodactylidae
- Genus: Physalaemus
- Species: P. rupestris

Binomial name
- Physalaemus rupestris Caramaschi, Carcerelli & Feio, 1991

Species of frog

Physalaemus rupestris, also known as the Ibitipoca dwarf frog, is a species of frog in the family Leptodactylidae. It is endemic to Brazil.

== Habitat ==
The frog lives in marshland within highly specific savannah and shrubland habitats within campos rupestres. Scientists have seen this frog between 1,200 and 1,700 m (3,900 and 5,600 ft) above sea level.

Scientists know the frog from exactly two places, both inside protected areas: Parque Estadual do Ibitipoca and Parque Estadual da Serra Negra da Mantiqueira.

== Reproduction ==
This frog deposits its eggs in a foam nest that floats on the water. The tadpoles develop in water.

== Threats ==
The IUCN classifies this species as endangered. Its principal threat is habitat loss associated with agriculture and fire. In 2019, the newly elected Brazilian administration rolled back legal protections, and damage from both accidental fires and arson increased. Because the frogs can only live in campos rupestres microhabitats with highly specific humidity, they may also be in danger from climate change.
