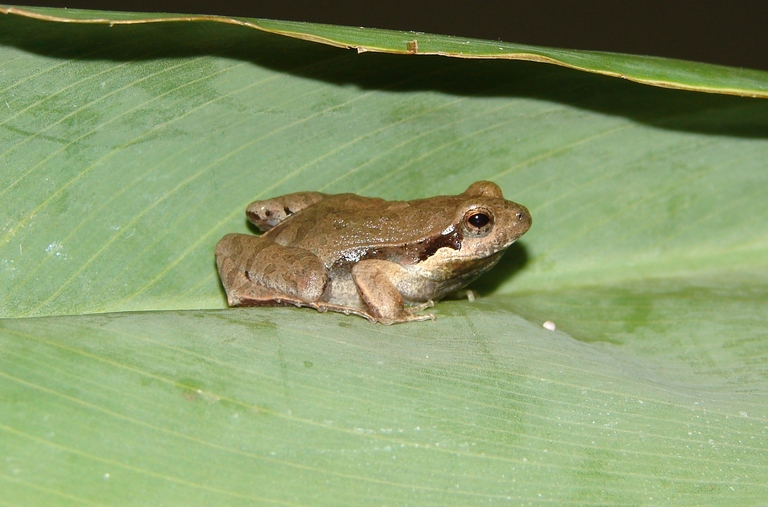

Conservation status
- Least Concern (IUCN 3.1)

Scientific classification
- Kingdom: Animalia
- Phylum: Chordata
- Class: Amphibia
- Order: Anura
- Family: Leptodactylidae
- Genus: Physalaemus
- Species: P. kroyeri

Binomial name
- Physalaemus kroyeri (Reinhardt & Lütken, 1862)

Synonyms
- Gomphobates kröyeri Reinhardt and Lütken, 1862 "1861"

= Physalaemus kroyeri =

Species of frog

Kroyer's dwarf frog, (Physalaemus kroyeri) is a species of frog in the family Leptodactylidae. It is endemic to northeastern Brazil.

== Habitat ==
This terrestrial frog is found in dry savannah places and shrubland in Caatinga biomes. Scientists have seen it between 0 and 240 m (0 and 787 ft) above sea level.

Scientists have reported the frog in protected areas, including Área de Proteção Ambiental Aldeia-Beberibe, Área de Proteção Ambiental do Alto Mucuri, Área de Proteção Ambiental do Rio Preto, Área de Proteção Ambiental Piquiri-Una, Área de Proteção Ambiental Plataforma Continental do Litoral Norte, Estação Ecológica do Seridó, Floresta Nacional Contendas do Sincorá, Floresta Nacional da Restinga de Cabedelo, Parque Nacional da Chapada da Diamantina, Reserva Biológica de Serra Negra, and Refúgio da Vida Silvestre Mata de Tapacurá.

== Reproduction ==
This frog has young in temporary ponds. The adult frog makes a foam nest for the eggs.

== Threats ==
The IUCN classifies this frog as least concern of extinction. In some parts of the frog's range, it is subject to habitat loss associated with agriculture, cattle overgrasing, and the setting of fires to create or maintain grazing habitat.
