= Physalaemus bokermanni =

Conservation status
- Least Concern (IUCN 3.1)

Scientific classification
- Kingdom: Animalia
- Phylum: Chordata
- Class: Amphibia
- Order: Anura
- Family: Leptodactylidae
- Genus: Physalaemus
- Species: P. bokermanni

Binomial name
- Physalaemus bokermanni Cardoso & Haddad, 1985

Species of frog

Physalaemus bokermanni is a species of frog in the family Leptodactylidae. It is endemic to Brazil.

== Habitat ==
The frog is found on the leaf litter in primary and secondary forest. It has been seen about 800 m (2,600 ft) above sea level.

About half of the frog's known range is within Parque Estadual da Serra do Mar.

== Reproduction ==
The male frog perches in a temporary body of water and calls to the female frogs. The adult frog builds a foam nest for the eggs. This frog can reproduce in puddles in areas that have been subject to selective logging and in secondary forests with significant regrowth but not in areas with no mature trees.

== Threats ==
The IUCN classifies this species as least concern of extinction. Brazil's Atlantic forest area was subject to considerable logging during the twentieth century, but this has largely subsided. Some of the frogs may be in some danger from urbanization and land conversion for agriculture and livestock rearing, which often involves fire.
