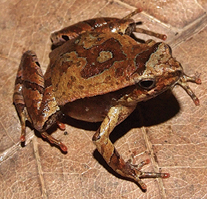

Conservation status
- Least Concern (IUCN 3.1)

Scientific classification
- Kingdom: Animalia
- Phylum: Chordata
- Class: Amphibia
- Order: Anura
- Family: Leptodactylidae
- Genus: Physalaemus
- Species: P. camacan

Binomial name
- Physalaemus camacan Pimenta, Cruz, and Silvano, 2005

= Physalaemus camacan =

Species of frog

Physalaemus camacan is a species of frog in the family Leptodactylidae. It is found in Brazil.

== Habitat ==
This frog is found on the leaf litter in primary forest, secondary forest, selectively logged forest, and shaded cacao and rubber tree farms. Scientists have seen this frog between 35 and 200 m (115 and 656 ft) above sea level.

Scientists have reported the frog in protected places: APA Costa de Itacare/Serra Grande, APA Lagoa Encantada, PARES Ponta da Tulha, and REBIO de Una.

== Reproduction ==
The male frogs perch near or on the water and call to the female frogs. This frog lays eggs in foam nests.

== Threats ==
The IUCN classifies this species as least concern of extinction. The frog's range contains large tracts of forest. In areas where it is subject to human-induced habitat loss, it is usually in favor of shade-reliant agroforestry, such as cacao cultivation. These shaded areas are also suitable habitat for this species. In other places, the frogs may be in some danger when people convert forests to farmland, animal pasture, and less favorable types of tree farms.
