= Physalaemus maximus =

Conservation status
- Near Threatened (IUCN 3.1)

Scientific classification
- Kingdom: Animalia
- Phylum: Chordata
- Class: Amphibia
- Order: Anura
- Family: Leptodactylidae
- Genus: Physalaemus
- Species: P. maximus

Binomial name
- Physalaemus maximus Feio, Pombal & Caramaschi, 1999

Species of frog

Physalaemus maximus is a species of frog in the family Leptodactylidae. It is endemic to Brazil.

== Habitat ==
This frog can only live in closed-canopy (biology) forests. It tends to be found on the leaf litter. Scientists have seen this frog between 1,000 and 1,400 m (3,300 and 4,600 ft) above sea level.

Scientists have reported the frog in a protected place, Parque Estadual Serra do Brigadeiro. Scientists believe it could also be present in Parque Estadual Serra Do Ouro Branco, Parque Estadual Do Itacolomi, and Reserva Particular Do Patrimônio Natural Águia Branca.

== Reproduction ==
This frog deposits eggs in a foam nest that floats on the water where the free-swimming tadpoles later develop.

== Threats ==
The IUCN classifies this species as near threatened. The part of Brazil in which it lives has been subject to many years of exploitation that has resulted in significant habitat loss in favor of largely small-scale agriculture, silviculture, livestock grazing, the fires used to convert forest and maintain farmland, and hydroelectric dam projects.
