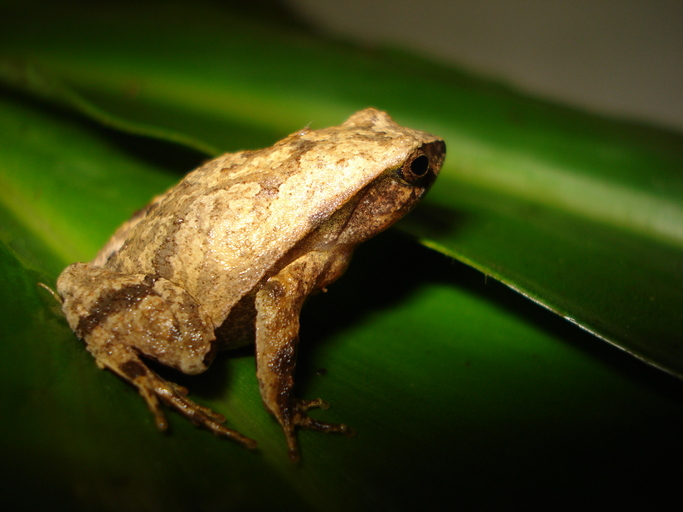

Conservation status
- Least Concern (IUCN 3.1)

Scientific classification
- Kingdom: Animalia
- Phylum: Chordata
- Class: Amphibia
- Order: Anura
- Family: Leptodactylidae
- Genus: Physalaemus
- Species: P. moreirae

Binomial name
- Physalaemus moreirae (Miranda-Ribeiro, 1937)

Synonyms
- Engystomops moreirae Miranda-Ribeiro, 1937; Physalaemus franciscae Heyer, 1985

= Physalaemus moreirae =

Species of frog

Physalaemus moreirae is a species of frog in the family Leptodactylidae. It is endemic to the Serra do Mar in the São Paulo state, Brazil.

== Description ==
Males measure 25–27 mm (0.98–1.06 in) and females 25–28 mm (0.98–1.10 in) in snout–vent length.

== Habitat and conservation ==
Its natural habitats are primary and secondary forests where it occurs in leaf-litter or on stones near water, often in association with small temporary pools (even those formed in boot prints). Breeding takes place in streams and ponds; the eggs are laid in foam nests in wide pools in the streams. Much of the species' range was once subject to significant logging, but that has largely subsided, and large swaths of suitable forest remain. What threat the frogs now face comes from urbanization, agriculture, fires, cattle grazing, and tree farming.

An estimated 50 percent of the population lives in Parque Estadual da Serra do Mar. The frogs have also been reported in Estação Biológica de Boracéia, Parque Natural Municipal Nascentes de Paranapiacaba, and Parque das Neblinas.
