= Physalaemus lateristriga =

Conservation status
- Least Concern (IUCN 3.1)

Scientific classification
- Kingdom: Animalia
- Phylum: Chordata
- Class: Amphibia
- Order: Anura
- Family: Leptodactylidae
- Genus: Physalaemus
- Species: P. lateristriga

Binomial name
- Physalaemus lateristriga (Steindachner, 1864)

Synonyms
- Nattereria lateristriga Steindachner, 1864; Physalaemus personatus Steindachner, 1864

Species of frog

Physalaemus lateristriga is a species of frog in the family Leptodactylidae. It is endemic to Brazil.

== Description ==
The adult male frog measures 30.3–37.8 mm in snout-vent length and the adult female frog 32.6–40.3 mm. The skin is gray or light brown in color with a line down the middle of the back. There is a black stripe on each side of the body. The upper eyelid has a white line on it. There is a dark brown rectangle on the top of each front leg and brown stripes on the tops of the hind legs. There is a brown mark further down on each hind leg near the heel. There are white spots on the anterior abdomen. The plantar surfaces of all four feet are red in color.

== Habitat ==
This frog lives in grassy habitats, rainforests, and the edges of forests. People see them near ponds, rivers, and streams with vegetation nearby. People have also seen them in pasture, secondary forest, and disturbed forests. Scientists have reported it between 45 and 980 m (148 and 3,215 ft) above sea level.

Scientists have also reported the frog in many protected places, including Curitiba City Parks and Campos Gerais National Park.

== Reproduction ==
This frog reproduces through larval development.

== Threats ==
The IUCN classifies this species as least concern of extinction. The frog's range has large amounts of suitable Atlantic forest habitat. In about 30 percent of its range, some of the frogs may be in some danger from deforestation associated with urbanization, small-scale and cash crop agriculture, silviculture, and cattle grazing. Logging was once also an issue, but current wood extraction takes place on only a small scale.
