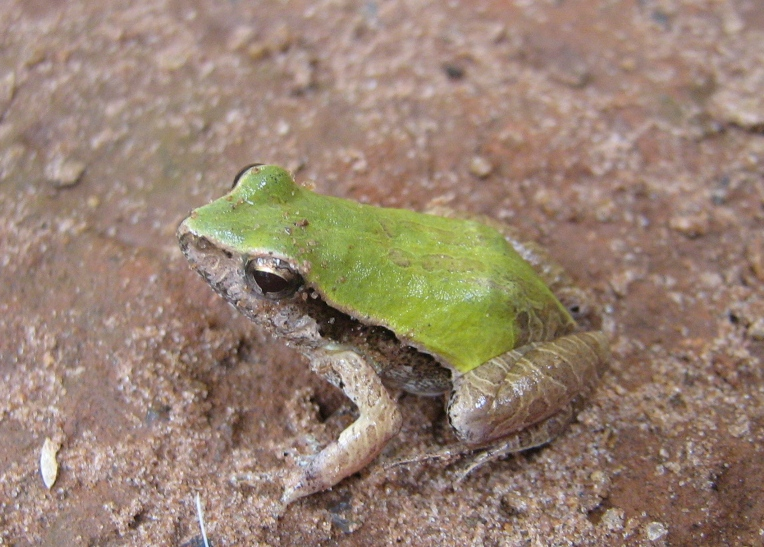

Conservation status
- Least Concern (IUCN 3.1)

Scientific classification
- Kingdom: Animalia
- Phylum: Chordata
- Class: Amphibia
- Order: Anura
- Family: Leptodactylidae
- Genus: Physalaemus
- Species: P. cuvieri

Binomial name
- Physalaemus cuvieri Fitzinger, 1826

Synonyms
- Gomphobates notatus Reinhardt & Lütken, 1862 "1861"; Paludicola neglecta Ahl, 1927

= Physalaemus cuvieri =

Species of frog

Physalaemus cuvieri is a species of frog in the family Leptodactylidae. It is found in Argentina, Brazil, Paraguay, and possibly also Bolivia, Guyana, Uruguay, and Venezuela.

== Habitat ==
This nocturnal frog lives in forests, savannah, flooded grassland, and livestock pasture. Scientists have seen it between 0 and 2,000 m (0 and 6,562 ft) above sea level. Scientists have reported the frog in protected places.

== Reproduction ==
These frogs reproduce in temporary ponds, puddles, and even cow footprints. The adult frog builds a foam nest for the eggs, which adheres to the base of a blade of grass near the edge of the water.

== Threats ==
The IUCN classifies this frog as least concern of extinction. What threats it faces include habitat loss, such as the loss of Argentina's Chaco in favor of farms and wood extraction. In other areas water pollution from agricultural runoff affects the frogs. Fires used for land conversion for the creation and improvement of cattle pasture affect the frogs. In Venezuela, gold mining and its many resulting ecological issues affect the frog.

== Gallery ==
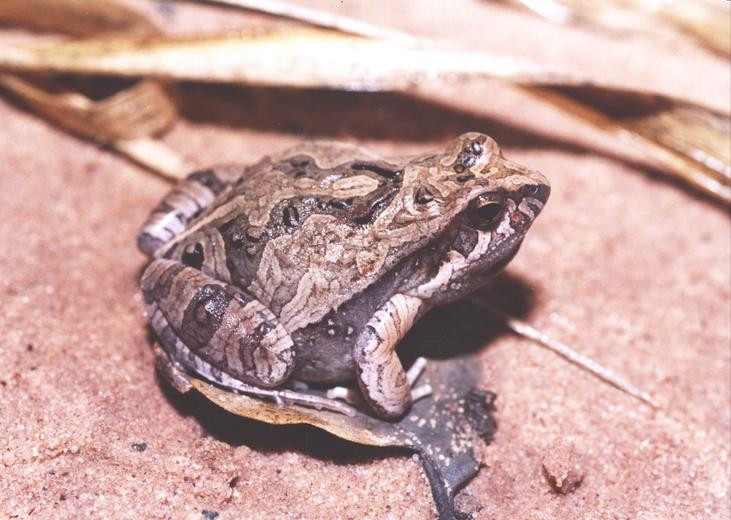

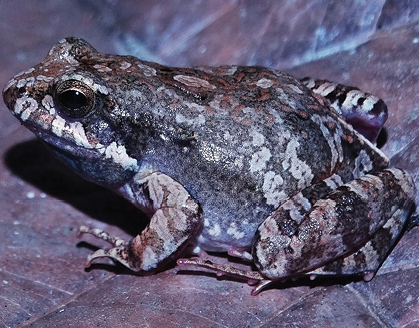
Espírito Santo, Brazil

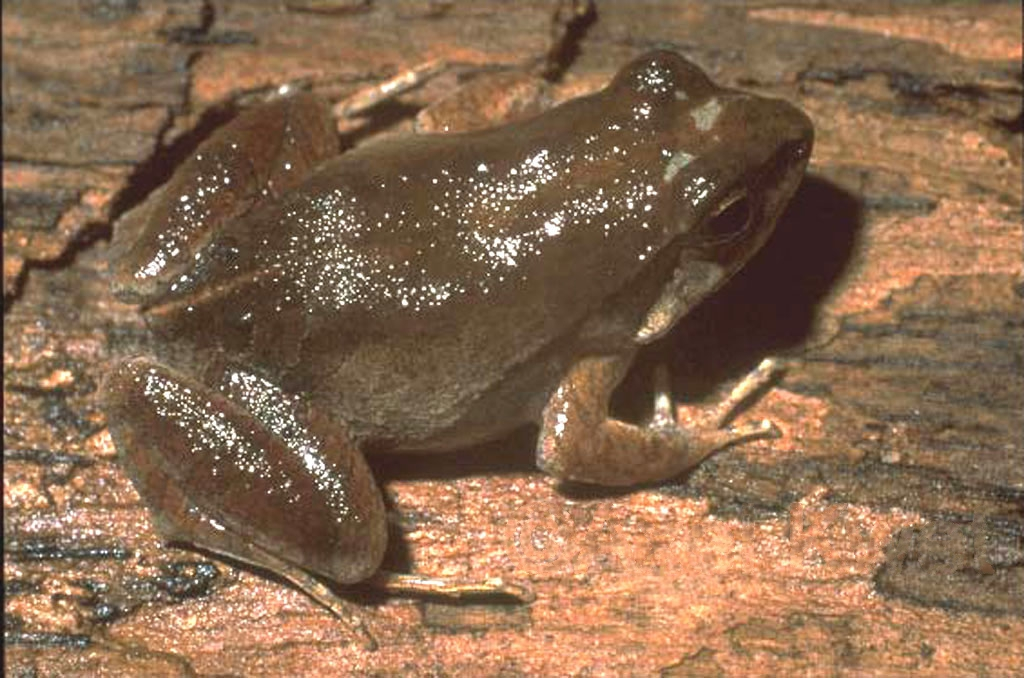

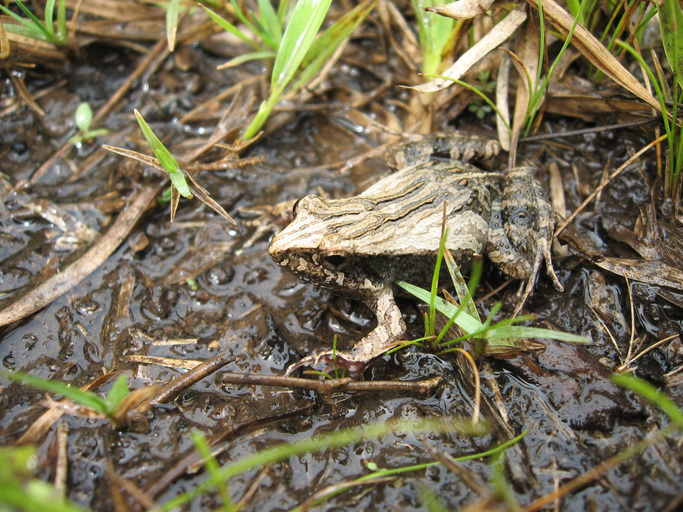

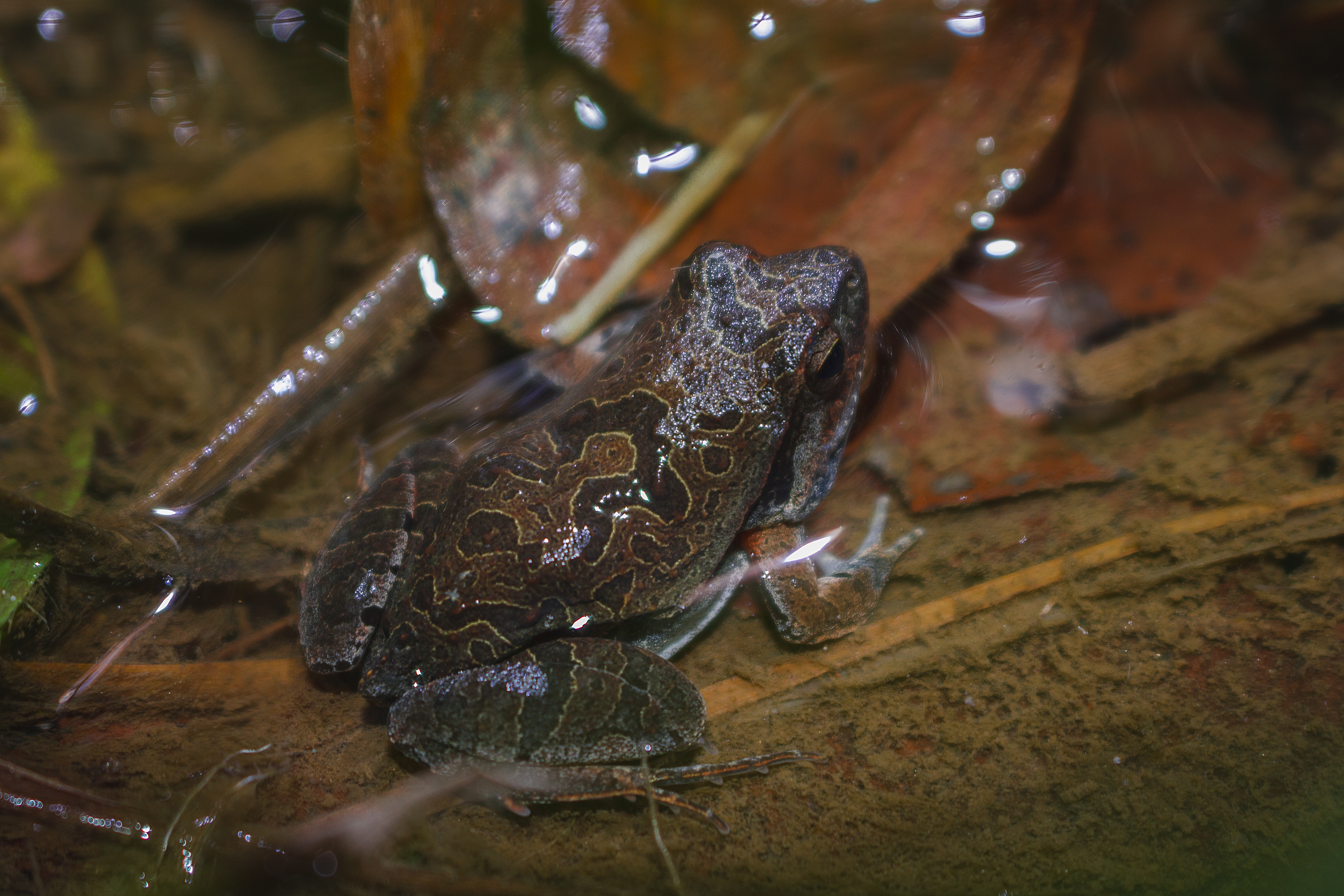
Terra Ronca State Park, Brazil
