= Lami José Lutzenberger Biological Reserve =

Protected area in Porto Alegre, Rio Grande do Sul, Brazil

- Reserva Biológica do Lami José Lutzenberger
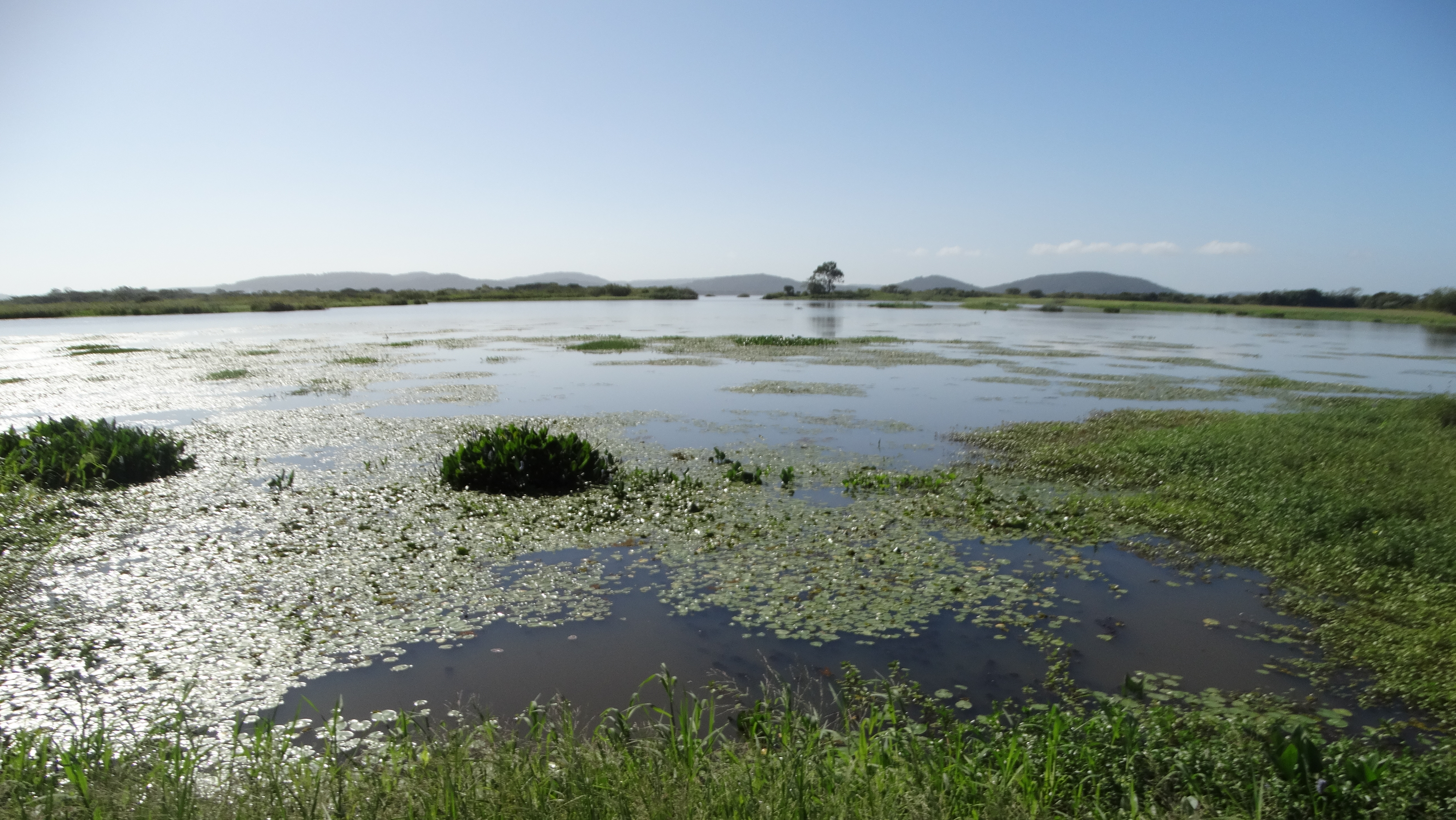

- Location within Brazil
- Nearest city: Porto Alegre, Rio Grande do Sul
- Coordinates: 30°14′47″S 51°06′35″W
- Area: 179 hectares (440 acres)
- Designation: Biological reserve
- Created: 1975

Lami José Lutzenberger Biological Reserve (Portuguese: Reserva Biológica do Lami José Lutzenberger) is a municipal biological reserve near Porto Alegre, Rio Grande do Sul, Brazil.

== Formation ==
The Lami José Lutzenberger Biological Reserve was established in 1975 in the Lami neighborhood of the city of Porto Alegre, and named after the local agronomist and environmentalist José Lutzenberger. It was the first municipal reserve in Brazil. The reserve covers 179 hectares (440 acres). The park reopened in April 2002 after being closed for more than ten years to allow its ecosystems to recover. The reserve conserves nature and supports research and environmental education.

== Environment ==
The conservation area includes riparian forests, wetlands, reeds, salt marshes, and fields, which support a wide variety of species of flora and wildlife. More than 300 native plant species have been identified and over 200 species of native birds, including local and migratory species. The reeds provides nurseries for fish, amphibians and molluscs, and turtles and lizards lay their eggs in the sandy elevations. Small groups of the semi-aquatic capybara (Hydrochoerus hydrochaeris) can be found in the riparian forests. Other species include the broad-snouted caiman (Caiman latirostris) and neotropical otter (Lontra longicaudis). Endangered plant species include Ficus cestrifolia, Erythrina crista-galli and Butia capitata.

== Sources ==
- Marco Aurélio (2015), "Cantinho Ecológico", A Semana (in Portuguese), archived from the original on 2016-05-05
- Reserva Biológica do Lami José Lutzenberger (in Portuguese), SMAM: Secretaria Municipal do Meio Ambiente de Porto Alegre
