= List of Pristimantis species =

As of October 2022, the following species are recognised in the genus Pristimantis.

== A ==
- Pristimantis aaptus (Lynch and Lescure, 1980)
- Pristimantis abakapa Rojas-Runjaic, Salerno, Señaris, and Pauly, 2013
- Pristimantis academicus Lehr, Moravec, and Gagliardi-Urrutia, 2010
- Pristimantis acatallelus (Lynch and Ruiz-Carranza, 1983)
- Pristimantis acerus (Lynch and Duellman, 1980)
- Pristimantis achatinus (Boulenger, 1898)
- Pristimantis achupalla Ttito and Catenazzi, 2021
- Pristimantis actinolaimus (Lynch and Rueda-Almonacid, 1998)
- Pristimantis actites (Lynch, 1979)
- Pristimantis acuminatus (Shreve, 1935)
- Pristimantis acutirostris (Lynch, 1984)
- Pristimantis adiastolus Duellman and Hedges, 2007
- Pristimantis adnus Crawford, Ryan, and Jaramillo, 2010
- Pristimantis aemulatus (Ruiz-Carranza, Lynch, and Ardila-Robayo, 1997)
- Pristimantis affinis (Werner, 1899)
- Pristimantis afrox Reyes-Puig, Yánez-Muñoz, Ortega, and Ron, 2020
- Pristimantis alalocophus (Roa-Trujillo and Ruiz-Carranza, 1991)
- Pristimantis albericoi (Lynch and Ruiz-Carranza, 1996)
- Pristimantis albertus Duellman and Hedges, 2007
- Pristimantis albujai Brito-M., Batallas-R., and Yánez-Muñoz, 2017
- Pristimantis alius Cuellar-Valencia, Arriaga-Jaramillo, García-Gómez, Ceballaos-Castro, Bolívar-García, Velásquez-Trujillo, Ortiz-Baez, and Ospina-Sarria, 2021
- Pristimantis allpapuyu Yánez-Muñoz, Sánchez-Nivicela, and Reyes-Puig, 2016
- Pristimantis almendariz Brito-M. and Pozo-Zamora, 2013
- Pristimantis altae (Dunn, 1942)
- Pristimantis altamazonicus (Barbour and Dunn, 1921)
- Pristimantis altamnis Elmer and Cannatella, 2008
- Pristimantis amaguanae Ron, Carrión, Caminer, Sagredo, Navarrete, Ortega, Varela-Jaramillo, Vidal-Maldonado, and Terán, 2020
- Pristimantis ameliae Barrio-Amorós, 2012
- Pristimantis amydrotus (Duellman and Lehr, 2007)
- Pristimantis andinodiabolus Sánchez-Nivicela, Urgilés, Cedeño-Palacios, Abad-Peñafiel, and Guayasamin, 2021
- Pristimantis andinogigas Yánez-Muñoz, Veintimilla-Yánez, Batallas-R., and Cisneros-Heredia, 2019
- Pristimantis andinognomus Lehr and Coloma, 2008
- Pristimantis anemerus (Duellman and Pramuk, 1999)
- Pristimantis angustilineatus (Lynch, 1998)
- Pristimantis aniptopalmatus (Duellman and Hedges, 2005)
- Pristimantis anolirex (Lynch, 1983)
- Pristimantis anotis (Walker and Test, 1955)
- Pristimantis antisuyu Catenazzi and Lehr, 2018
- Pristimantis apiculatus (Lynch and Burrowes, 1990)
- Pristimantis appendiculatus (Werner, 1894)
- Pristimantis aquilonaris Lehr, Aguilar, Siu-Ting, and Jordán, 2007
- Pristimantis ardalonychus (Duellman and Pramuk, 1999)
- Pristimantis ardilae Acevedo-Rincón, Armesto, and Palma, 2020
- Pristimantis ardyae Reyes-Puig, Reyes-Puig, and Yánez-Muñoz, 2013
- Pristimantis ashaninka Lehr and Moravec, 2017
- Pristimantis astralos Lehr, Lyu, and Catenazzi, 2021
- Pristimantis atillo Páez and Ron, 2019
- Pristimantis atrabracus (Duellman and Pramuk, 1999)
- Pristimantis atratus (Lynch, 1979)
- Pristimantis attenboroughi Lehr and von May, 2017
- Pristimantis aurantiguttatus (Ruiz-Carranza, Lynch, and Ardila-Robayo, 1997)
- Pristimantis aureolineatus (Guayasamin, Ron, Cisneros-Heredia, Lamar, and McCracken, 2006)
- Pristimantis aureoventris Kok, Means, and Bossuyt, 2011
- Pristimantis auricarens (Myers and Donnelly, 2008)
- Pristimantis avicuporum (Duellman and Pramuk, 1999)
- Pristimantis avius (Myers and Donnelly, 1997)

== B ==
- Pristimantis bacchus (Lynch, 1984)
- Pristimantis baiotis (Lynch, 1998)
- Pristimantis balionotus (Lynch, 1979)
- Pristimantis bambu Arteaga-Navarro and Guayasamin, 2011
- Pristimantis barrigai Brito and Almendáriz C., 2018
- Pristimantis baryecuus (Lynch, 1979)
- Pristimantis batrachites (Lynch, 2003)
- Pristimantis bearsei (Duellman, 1992)
- Pristimantis bellae Reyes-Puig and Yánez-Muñoz, 2012
- Pristimantis bellator Lehr, Aguilar, Siu-Ting, and Jordán, 2007
- Pristimantis bellona (Lynch, 1992)
- Pristimantis bernali (Lynch, 1986)
- Pristimantis bicantus Guayasamin and Funk, 2009
- Pristimantis bicolor (Rueda-Almonacid and Lynch, 1983)
- Pristimantis bicumulus (Peters, 1863)
- Pristimantis bipunctatus (Duellman and Hedges, 2005)
- Pristimantis blasi Duarte-Marín, Montoya-Marín, and Rivera-Gómez, 2022
- Pristimantis boconoensis (Rivero and Mayorga, 1973)
- Pristimantis bogotensis (Peters, 1863)
- Pristimantis boucephalus Lehr, Moravec, Cusi, and Gvoždík, 2017
- Pristimantis boulengeri (Lynch, 1981)
- Pristimantis bounides Lehr, von May, Moravec, and Cusi, 2017
- Pristimantis bowara Acevedo-Rincón, Armesto, and Palma, 2020
- Pristimantis brevicrus (Andersson, 1945)
- Pristimantis brevifrons (Lynch, 1981)
- Pristimantis briceni (Boulenger, 1903)
- Pristimantis bromeliaceus (Lynch, 1979)
- Pristimantis buccinator (Rodriguez, 1994)
- Pristimantis buckleyi (Boulenger, 1882)
- Pristimantis buenaventura Arteaga-Navarro, Pyron, Peñafiel, Romero-Barreto, Culebras, Bustamante, Yánez-Muñoz, and Guayasamin, 2016
- Pristimantis burtoniorum Reyes-Puig, Reyes-Puig, Franco-Mena, Jost, and Yánez-Muñoz, 2022
- Pristimantis bustamante Chaparro, Motta, Gutiérrez, and Padial, 2012

== C ==
- Pristimantis cabrerai (Cochran and Goin, 1970)
- Pristimantis cacao (Lynch, 1992)
- Pristimantis caeruleonotus Lehr, Aguilar, Siu-Ting, and Jordán, 2007
- Pristimantis cajamarcensis (Barbour and Noble, 1920)
- Pristimantis cajanuma Urgilés, Székely, Székely, Christodoulides, Sánchez-Nivicela, and Savage, 2019
- Pristimantis calcaratus (Boulenger, 1908)
- Pristimantis calcarulatus (Lynch, 1976)
- Pristimantis calima Ospina-Sarria and Duellman, 2019
- Pristimantis campesino Sepúlveda‑Seguro, Marín-Castaño, Amézquita, García, and Daza-R., 2022
- Pristimantis campinarana Mônico, Ferrão, Moravec, Fouquet, and Lima 2023
- Pristimantis caniari Rámírez-Jaramillo, Reyes-Puig, Batallas-R., and Yánez-Muñoz, 2018
- Pristimantis cantitans (Myers and Donnelly, 1996)
- Pristimantis capitonis (Lynch, 1998)
- Pristimantis caprifer (Lynch, 1977)
- Pristimantis carlosceroni Valencia, Bejarano-Muñoz, and Yánez-Muñoz, 2013
- Pristimantis carlossanchezi (Arroyo, 2007)
- Pristimantis carranguerorum (Lynch, 1994)
- Pristimantis carvalhoi (Lutz, 1952)
- Pristimantis carylae Rivera-Correa, González-Durán, Saldarriaga-Gómez, and Duarte-Marín, 2021
- Pristimantis caryophyllaceus (Barbour, 1928)
- Pristimantis cedros Hutter and Guayasamin, 2015
- Pristimantis celator (Lynch, 1976)
- Pristimantis cerasinus (Cope, 1875)
- Pristimantis ceuthospilus (Duellman and Wild, 1993)
- Pristimantis chalceus (Peters, 1873)
- Pristimantis chamezensis Acosta-Galvis, Saldarriaga-Gómez, Ramírez, and Vargas-Ramírez, 2020
- Pristimantis charlottevillensis (Kaiser, Dwyer, Feichtinger, and Schmid, 1995)
- Pristimantis chiastonotus (Lynch and Hoogmoed, 1977)
- Pristimantis chimu Lehr, 2007
- Pristimantis chinguelas
- Pristimantis chloronotus (Lynch, 1969)
- Pristimantis chocoensis Reyes-Puig, Yánez-Muñoz, Ortega, and Ron, 2020
- Pristimantis chocolatebari Rivera-Correa, González-Durán, Saldarriaga-Gómez, and Duarte-Marín, 2021
- Pristimantis chomskyi Páez and Ron, 2019
- Pristimantis chrysops (Lynch and Ruiz-Carranza, 1996)
- Pristimantis churuwiai Brito-M., Batallas-R., and Yánez-Muñoz, 2017
- Pristimantis cisnerosi Reyes-Puig, Yánez-Muñoz, Ortega, and Ron, 2020
- Pristimantis citriogaster (Duellman, 1992)
- Pristimantis colodactylus (Lynch, 1979)
- Pristimantis colomai (Lynch and Duellman, 1997)
- Pristimantis colonensis (Mueses-Cisneros, 2007)
- Pristimantis colostichos (La Marca and Smith, 1982)
- Pristimantis condor (Lynch and Duellman, 1980)
- Pristimantis conservatio Barrio-Amorós, Heinicke, and Hedges, 2013
- Pristimantis conspicillatus (Günther, 1858)
- Pristimantis cordovae (Lehr and Duellman, 2007)
- Pristimantis corniger (Lynch and Suárez-Mayorga, 2003)
- Pristimantis coronatus Lehr and Duellman, 2007
- Pristimantis corrugatus (Duellman, Lehr, and Venegas, 2006)
- Pristimantis cosnipatae (Duellman, 1978)
- Pristimantis cremnobates (Lynch and Duellman, 1980)
- Pristimantis crenunguis (Lynch, 1976)
- Pristimantis croceoinguinis (Lynch, 1968)
- Pristimantis crucifer (Boulenger, 1899)
- Pristimantis cruciocularis (Lehr, Lundberg, Aguilar, and von May, 2006)
- Pristimantis cruentus (Peters, 1873)
- Pristimantis cryophilius (Lynch, 1979)
- Pristimantis cryptomelas (Lynch, 1979)
- Pristimantis cryptopictus Patiño-Ocampo, Duarte-Marín, and Rivera-Correa, 2022
- Pristimantis cuentasi (Lynch, 2003)
- Pristimantis culatensis (La Marca, 2007)
- Pristimantis cuneirostris (Duellman and Pramuk, 1999)
- Pristimantis curtipes (Boulenger, 1882)

== D ==
- Pristimantis danae (Duellman, 1978)
- Pristimantis daquilemai Brito-Zapata, Reyes-Puig, Cisneros-Heredia, Zumel, and Ron, 2021
- Pristimantis degener (Lynch and Duellman, 1997)
- Pristimantis deinops (Lynch, 1996)
- Pristimantis delius (Duellman and Mendelson, 1995)
- Pristimantis dendrobatoides Means and Savage, 2007
- Pristimantis devillei (Boulenger, 1880)
- Pristimantis deyi Lehr, Gregory, and Catenazzi, 2013
- Pristimantis diadematus (Jiménez de la Espada, 1875)
- Pristimantis diaphonus (Lynch, 1986)
- Pristimantis diogenes (Lynch and Ruiz-Carranza, 1996)
- Pristimantis dissimulatus (Lynch and Duellman, 1997)
- Pristimantis divnae Lehr and von May, 2009
- Pristimantis dorado Rivera-Correa, Lamadrid-Feris, and Crawford, 2016
- Pristimantis dorsopictus (Rivero and Serna, 1988)
- Pristimantis duellmani (Lynch, 1980)
- Pristimantis duende (Lynch, 2001)
- Pristimantis dundeei (Heyer and Muñoz, 1999)

== E ==
- Pristimantis ecuadorensis Guayasamin, Hutter, Tapia, Culebras, Peñafiel, Pyron, Morochz, Funk, and Arteaga-Navarro, 2017
- Pristimantis educatoris Ryan, Lips, and Giermakowski, 2010
- Pristimantis elegans (Peters, 1863)
- Pristimantis enigmaticus Ortega-Andrade, Rojas-Soto, Valencia, Espinosa de los Monteros, Morrone, Ron, and Cannatella, 2015
- Pristimantis epacrus (Lynch and Suárez-Mayorga, 2000)
- Pristimantis eremitus (Lynch, 1980)
- Pristimantis eriphus (Lynch and Duellman, 1980)
- Pristimantis ernesti (Flores, 1987)
- Pristimantis erythroinguinis Catenazzi and Lehr, 2018, Zootaxa, 4394:
- Pristimantis erythropleura (Boulenger, 1896)
- Pristimantis erythros Sánchez-Nivicela, Celi-Piedra, Posse-Sarmiento, Urgilés, Yánez-Muñoz, and Cisneros-Heredia, 2018
- Pristimantis esmeraldas (Guayasamin, 2004)
- Pristimantis espedeus Fouquet, Martinez, Courtois, Dewynter, Pineau, Gaucher, Blanc, Marty, and Kok, 2013
- Pristimantis eugeniae (Lynch and Duellman, 1997)
- Pristimantis euphronides (Schwartz, 1967)
- Pristimantis eurydactylus (Hedges and Schlüter, 1992)
- Pristimantis exoristus (Duellman and Pramuk, 1999)

== F ==
- Pristimantis factiosus (Lynch and Rueda-Almonacid, 1998)
- Pristimantis fallax (Lynch and Rueda-Almonacid, 1999)
- Pristimantis farisorum Mueses-Cisneros, Perdomo-Castillo, and Cepeda-Quilindo, 2013
- Pristimantis fasciatus Barrio-Amorós, Rojas-Runjaic, and Infante-Rivero, 2008
- Pristimantis fenestratus (Steindachner, 1864)
- Pristimantis ferwerdai Amézquita, Suárez, Palacios-Rodríguez, Beltrán, Rodríguez López, Barrientos, Daza-R., and Mazariegos, 2019
- Pristimantis festae (Peracca, 1904)
- Pristimantis fetosus (Lynch and Rueda-Almonacid, 1998)
- Pristimantis flabellidiscus (La Marca, 2007)
- Pristimantis floridus (Lynch and Duellman, 1997)
- Pristimantis frater (Werner, 1899)

== G ==
- Pristimantis gagliardi Ortega-Andrade, Deichmann, and Chaparro, 2021
- Pristimantis gagliardoi Bustamante and Mendelson, 2008
- Pristimantis gaigei (Dunn, 1931)
- Pristimantis galdi Jiménez de la Espada, 1870
- Pristimantis ganonotus (Duellman and Lynch, 1988)
- Pristimantis geminus Kaiser, Barrio-Amorós, Rivas-Fuenmayor, Steinlein, and Schmid, 2015
- Pristimantis gentryi (Lynch and Duellman, 1997)
- Pristimantis ginesi (Rivero, 1964)
- Pristimantis giorgii Oliveira, Alves da Silva, Guimarães, Penhacek, Martínez, Rodrigues, Santana, and Hernández-Ruz, 2020
- Pristimantis gladiator (Lynch, 1976)
- Pristimantis glandulosus (Boulenger, 1880)
- Pristimantis gloria Páez and Ron, 2019
- Pristimantis gracilis (Lynch, 1986)
- Pristimantis gralarias Guayasamin, Arteaga-Navarro, and Hutter, 2018
- Pristimantis grandiceps (Lynch, 1984)
- Pristimantis gretathunbergae Mebert, González-Pinzón, Miranda, Griffith, Veselý, Schmid, and Batista, 2022
- Pristimantis gryllus Barrio-Amorós, Guayasamin, and Hedges, 2012
- Pristimantis guaiquinimensis (Schlüter and Rödder, 2007)
- Pristimantis gualacenio Urgilés, Sánchez-Nivicela, Nieves, and Yánez-Muñoz, 2014
- Pristimantis gutturalis (Hoogmoed, Lynch, and Lescure, 1977)

== H ==
- Pristimantis hamiotae (Flores, 1994)
- Pristimantis hampatusami Yánez-Muñoz, Sánchez-Nivicela, and Reyes-Puig, 2016
- Pristimantis hectus (Lynch and Burrowes, 1990)
- Pristimantis helvolus (Lynch and Rueda-Almonacid, 1998)
- Pristimantis hernandezi (Lynch and Ruiz-Carranza, 1983)
- Pristimantis hoogmoedi Kaiser, Barrio-Amorós, Rivas-Fuenmayor, Steinlein, and Schmid, 2015
- Pristimantis huicundo (Guayasamin, Almeida-Reinoso, and Nogales-Sornosa, 2004)
- Pristimantis humboldti Lehr, von May, Moravec, and Cusi, 2017
- Pristimantis hybotragus (Lynch, 1992)

== I ==
- Pristimantis ignicolor (Lynch and Duellman, 1980)
- Pristimantis iiap Padial, Gagliardi-Urrutia, Chaparro, and Gutiérrez, 2016
- Pristimantis illotus (Lynch and Duellman, 1997)
- Pristimantis imitatrix (Duellman, 1978)
- Pristimantis imthurni Kok, 2013
- Pristimantis incanus (Lynch and Duellman, 1980)
- Pristimantis incertus (Lutz, 1927)
- Pristimantis incomptus (Lynch and Duellman, 1980)
- Pristimantis infraguttatus (Duellman and Pramuk, 1999)
- Pristimantis ingles Cuellar-Valencia, Arriaga-Jaramillo, García-Gómez, Ceballaos-Castro, Bolívar-García, Velásquez-Trujillo, Ortiz-Baez, and Ospina-Sarria, 2021
- Pristimantis inguinalis (Parker, 1940)
- Pristimantis inusitatus (Lynch and Duellman, 1980)
- Pristimantis ixalus (Lynch, 2003)

== J ==
- Pristimantis jabonensis (La Marca, 2007)
- Pristimantis jaguensis Rivera-Prieto, Rivera-Correa, and Daza-R., 2014
- Pristimantis jaimei (Lynch, 1992)
- Pristimantis jamescameroni Kok, 2013
- Pristimantis jester Means and Savage, 2007
- Pristimantis jimenezi Páez and Ron, 2019
- Pristimantis johannesdei (Rivero and Serna, 1988)
- Pristimantis jorgevelosai (Lynch, 1994)
- Pristimantis juanchoi (Lynch, 1996)
- Pristimantis jubatus (García and Lynch, 2006)

== K ==
- Pristimantis kareliae (La Marca, 2005)
- Pristimantis katoptroides (Flores, 1988)
- Pristimantis kelephus (Lynch, 1998)
- Pristimantis kichwarum Elmer and Cannatella, 2008
- Pristimantis kirklandi (Flores, 1985)
- Pristimantis kiruhampatu Venegas, García Ayachi, and Catenazzi, 2021
- Pristimantis koehleri Padial and De la Riva, 2009
- Pristimantis kuri Yánez-Muñoz, Sánchez-Nivicela, and Reyes-Puig, 2016

== L ==
- Pristimantis labiosus (Lynch, Ruiz-Carranza, and Ardila-Robayo, 1994)
- Pristimantis lacrimosus (Jiménez de la Espada, 1875)
- Pristimantis lancinii (Donoso-Barros, 1965)
- Pristimantis lanthanites (Lynch, 1975)
- Pristimantis lasalleorum (Lynch, 1995)
- Pristimantis latericius Batallas-R. and Brito-M., 2014
- Pristimantis laticlavius (Lynch and Burrowes, 1990)
- Pristimantis latidiscus (Boulenger, 1898)
- Pristimantis latro Oliveira, Rodrigues, Kaefer, Pinto, and Hernández-Ruz, 2017
- Pristimantis ledzeppelin Brito-Zapata and Reyes-Puig, 2021
- Pristimantis lemur (Lynch and Rueda-Almonacid, 1998)
- Pristimantis leoni (Lynch, 1976)
- Pristimantis leopardus Rivera-Correa, Jiménez-Rivillas, and Daza-R., 2017
- Pristimantis leptolophus (Lynch, 1980)
- Pristimantis leucopus (Lynch, 1976)
- Pristimantis leucorrhinus Boano, Mazzotti, and Sindaco, 2008
- Pristimantis librarius (Flores and Vigle, 1994)
- Pristimantis lichenoides (Lynch and Rueda-Almonacid, 1997)
- Pristimantis limoncochensis Ortega-Andrade, Rojas-Soto, Valencia, Espinosa de los Monteros, Morrone, Ron, and Cannatella, 2015
- Pristimantis lindae (Duellman, 1978)
- Pristimantis lirellus (Dwyer, 1995)
- Pristimantis lividus (Lynch and Duellman, 1980)
- Pristimantis llanganati Navarrete, Venegas, and Ron, 2016
- Pristimantis llojsintuta (Köhler and Lötters, 1999)
- Pristimantis lojanus Székely, Székely, Ordóñez-Delgado, Armijos-Ojeda, and Vörös, 2021
- Pristimantis longicorpus Kaiser, Barrio-Amorós, Rivas-Fuenmayor, Steinlein, and Schmid, 2015
- Pristimantis loujosti Yánez-Muñoz, Cisneros-Heredia, and Reyes-Puig, 2011
- Pristimantis loustes (Lynch, 1979)
- Pristimantis lucasi Duellman and Chaparro, 2008
- Pristimantis lucidosignatus Rödder and Schmitz, 2009
- Pristimantis luscombei (Duellman and Mendelson, 1995)
- Pristimantis luteolateralis (Lynch, 1976)
- Pristimantis lutitus (Lynch, 1984)
- Pristimantis lutzae Páez and Ron, 2019
- Pristimantis lymani (Barbour and Noble, 1920)
- Pristimantis lynchi (Duellman and Simmons, 1977)
- Pristimantis lythrodes (Lynch and Lescure, 1980)

== M ==
- Pristimantis macrummendozai Acosta-Galvis, 2015
- Pristimantis maculosus (Lynch, 1991)
- Pristimantis malkini (Lynch, 1980)
- Pristimantis mallii Reyes-Puig, Reyes-Puig, Velarde-Garcéz, Dávalos, Mancero, Navarrete, Yánez-Muñoz, Cisneros-Heredia, and Ron, 2019
- Pristimantis marahuaka (Fuentes-Ramos and Barrio-Amorós, 2004)
- Pristimantis marcoreyesi Reyes-Puig, Reyes-Puig, Rámirez-Jaramillo, Pérez-L., and Yánez-Munoz, 2015 "2014".
- Pristimantis mariaelenae Venegas and Duellman, 2012
- Pristimantis marmoratus (Boulenger, 1900)
- Pristimantis mars (Lynch and Ruiz-Carranza, 1996)
- Pristimantis martiae (Lynch, 1974)
- Pristimantis maryanneae Reyes-Puig, Reyes-Puig, Franco-Mena, Jost, and Yánez-Muñoz, 2022
- Pristimantis matidiktyo Ortega-Andrade and Valencia, 2012
- Pristimantis matildae Székely, Eguiguren, Ordóñez-Delgado, Armijos-Ojeda, and Székely, 2020
- Pristimantis mazar Guayasamin and Arteaga-Navarro, 2013
- Pristimantis medemi (Lynch, 1994)
- Pristimantis melanogaster (Duellman and Pramuk, 1999)
- Pristimantis melanoproctus (Rivero, 1984)
- Pristimantis memorans (Myers and Donnelly, 1997)
- Pristimantis mendax (Duellman, 1978)
- Pristimantis meridionalis (Lehr and Duellman, 2007)
- Pristimantis merostictus (Lynch, 1984)
- Pristimantis metabates (Duellman and Pramuk, 1999)
- Pristimantis miktos Ortego-Andrade and Venegas, 2014
- Pristimantis milpe Ron, 2026
- Pristimantis miltongallardoi Bejarano-Muñoz, Ron, Navarrete, and Yánez-Muñoz, 2022
- Pristimantis mindo Arteaga-Navarro, Yáñez-Muñoz, and Guayasamin, 2013
- Pristimantis minimus Terán-Valdez and Guayasamin, 2010
- Pristimantis minutulus Duellman and Hedges, 2007
- Pristimantis miyatai (Lynch, 1984)
- Pristimantis mnionaetes (Lynch, 1998)
- Pristimantis moa Oliveira, Alves da Silva, Guimarães, Penhacek, Martínez, Rodrigues, Santana, and Hernández-Ruz, 2020
- Pristimantis modipeplus (Lynch, 1981)
- Pristimantis molybrignus (Lynch, 1986)
- Pristimantis mondolfii (Rivero, 1984)
- Pristimantis morlaco Sánchez-Nivicela, Toral-Contreras, and Urgilés, 2022
- Pristimantis moro (Savage, 1965)
- Pristimantis muchimuk Barrio-Amorós, Mesa, Brewer-Carías, and McDiarmid, 2010
- Pristimantis multicolor Páez and Ron, 2019
- Pristimantis munozi Rojas-Runjaic, Delgado C., and Guayasamin, 2014
- Pristimantis muranunka Brito M., Almendariz-C., Batallas R., and Ron, 2017
- Pristimantis muricatus (Lynch and Miyata, 1980)
- Pristimantis muscosus (Duellman and Pramuk, 1999)
- Pristimantis museosus (Ibáñez, Jaramillo, and Arosemena, 1994)
- Pristimantis mutabilis Guayasamin, Krynak, Krynak, Culebras, and Hutter, 2015
- Pristimantis myersi (Goin and Cochran, 1963)
- Pristimantis myops (Lynch, 1998)

== N ==
- Pristimantis nangaritza Páez and Ron, 2019
- Pristimantis nankints Ron, Carrión, Caminer, Sagredo, Navarrete, Ortega, Varela-Jaramillo, Maldonado-Castro, and Terán, 2020
- Pristimantis nanus Zumel, Buckley, and Ron, 2021
- Pristimantis nebulosus (Henle, 1992)
- Pristimantis nelsongalloi Valencia, Valladares-Suntasig, Tipantiza-Tuguminago, and Dueñas, 2019
- Pristimantis nephophilus (Duellman and Pramuk, 1999)
- Pristimantis nervicus (Lynch, 1994)
- Pristimantis nicefori (Cochran and Goin, 1970)
- Pristimantis nietoi Arteaga-Navarro, Pyron, Peñafiel, Romero-Barreto, Culebras, Bustamante, Yánez-Muñoz, and Guayasamin, 2016
- Pristimantis nigrogriseus (Andersson, 1945)
- Pristimantis nimbus Urgilés, Posse, Timbe, Astudillo, and Sánchez-Nivicela, 2017
- Pristimantis nubisilva Kaiser, Barrio-Amorós, Rivas-Fuenmayor, Steinlein, and Schmid, 2015
- Pristimantis numbala P. Székely, D. Székely, Armijos-Ojeda, Hualpa-Vega & Vörös, 2023
- Pristimantis nunezcortezi
- Pristimantis nyctophylax (Lynch, 1976)

== O ==
- Pristimantis obmutescens (Lynch, 1980)
- Pristimantis ocellatus (Lynch and Burrowes, 1990)
- Pristimantis ockendeni (Boulenger, 1912)
- Pristimantis ocreatus (Lynch, 1981)
- Pristimantis okmoi Ortega-Andrade, Deichmann, and Chaparro, 2021
- Pristimantis olivaceus (Köhler, Morales, Lötters, Reichle, and Aparicio, 1998)
- Pristimantis omarrhynchus Bejarano-Muñoz, Ron, Navarrete, and Yánez-Muñoz, 2022
- Pristimantis omeviridis Ortega-Andrade, Rojas-Soto, Valencia, Espinosa de los Monteros, Morrone, Ron, and Cannatella, 2015
- Pristimantis onorei Rödder and Schmitz, 2009
- Pristimantis orcesi (Lynch, 1972)
- Pristimantis orcus Lehr, Catenazzi, and Rodríguez, 2009
- Pristimantis orestes (Lynch, 1979)
- Pristimantis ornatissimus (Despax, 1911)
- Pristimantis ornatus (Lehr, Lundberg, Aguilar, and von May, 2006)
- Pristimantis orpacobates (Lynch, Ruiz-Carranza, and Ardila-Robayo, 1994)
- Pristimantis orphnolaimus (Lynch, 1970)
- Pristimantis ortizi (Guayasamin, Almeida-Reinoso, and Nogales-Sornosa, 2004)

== P ==
- Pristimantis padiali Moravec, Lehr, Perez-Peña, Lopez, Gagliardi-Urrutia, and Arista-Tuanama, 2010
- Pristimantis pahuma Hutter and Guayasamin, 2015
- Pristimantis paisa (Lynch and Ardila-Robayo, 1999)
- Pristimantis paladines P. Székely, D. Székely, Armijos-Ojeda, Hualpa-Vega & Vörös, 2023
- Pristimantis palmeri (Boulenger, 1912)
- Pristimantis paquishae Brito-M., Batallas-R., and Velalcázar, 2014
- Pristimantis paramerus (Rivero, 1984)
- Pristimantis pardalinus (Lehr, Lundberg, Aguilar, and von May, 2006)
- Pristimantis pardalis (Barbour, 1928)
- Pristimantis parectatus (Lynch and Rueda-Almonacid, 1998)
- Pristimantis pariagnomus Kaiser, Barrio-Amorós, Rivas-Fuenmayor, Steinlein, and Schmid, 2015
- Pristimantis parvillus (Lynch, 1976)
- Pristimantis pastazensis (Andersson, 1945)
- Pristimantis pataikos (Duellman and Pramuk, 1999)
- Pristimantis paulodutrai (Bokermann, 1975)
- Pristimantis paulpittmani Venegas, García Ayachi, and Catenazzi, 2021
- Pristimantis paululus (Lynch, 1974)
- Pristimantis pecki (Duellman and Lynch, 1988)
- Pristimantis pedimontanus (La Marca, 2004)
- Pristimantis penelopus (Lynch and Rueda-Almonacid, 1999)
- Pristimantis peraticus (Lynch, 1980)
- Pristimantis percnopterus (Duellman and Pramuk, 1999)
- Pristimantis percultus (Lynch, 1979)
- Pristimantis permixtus (Lynch, Ruiz-Carranza, and Ardila-Robayo, 1994)
- Pristimantis peruvianus (Melin, 1941)
- Pristimantis petersi (Lynch and Duellman, 1980)
- Pristimantis petersioides Carrión-Olmedo and Ron, 2021
- Pristimantis petrobardus (Duellman, 1991)
- Pristimantis phalaroinguinis (Duellman and Lehr, 2007)
- Pristimantis phalarus (Lynch, 1998)
- Pristimantis pharangobates (Duellman, 1978)
- Pristimantis philipi (Lynch and Duellman, 1995)
- Pristimantis phoxocephalus (Lynch, 1979)
- Pristimantis phragmipleuron (Rivero and Serna, 1988)
- Pristimantis piceus (Lynch, Ruiz-Carranza, and Ardila-Robayo, 1996)
- Pristimantis pichincha Yánez-Muñoz, Reyes-Puig, Bejarano-Muñoz, and Ron, 2016
- Pristimantis pictus Oliveira, Alves da Silva, Guimarães, Penhacek, Martínez, Rodrigues, Santana, and Hernández-Ruz, 2020
- Pristimantis pinchaque Reyes-Puig, Reyes-Puig, Pérez-L., and Yánez-Muñoz, 2015
- Pristimantis pinguis (Duellman and Pramuk, 1999)
- Pristimantis pirrensis (Ibáñez and Crawford, 2004)
- Pristimantis platychilus (Lynch, 1996)
- Pristimantis platydactylus (Boulenger, 1903)
- Pristimantis pleurostriatus (Rivero, 1984)
- Pristimantis pluvialis Shepack, von May, Ttito, and Catenazzi, 2016
- Pristimantis pluvian Oliveira, Alves da Silva, Guimarães, Penhacek, Martínez, Rodrigues, Santana, and Hernández-Ruz, 2020
- Pristimantis polemistes (Lynch and Ardila-Robayo, 2004)
- Pristimantis polychrus (Ruiz-Carranza, Lynch, and Ardila-Robayo, 1997)
- Pristimantis postducheminorum Palacios-Rodríguez, Daza-R., and Mazariegos-H., 2022
- Pristimantis pramukae Zumel, Buckley, and Ron, 2021
- Pristimantis prolatus (Lynch and Duellman, 1980)
- Pristimantis proserpens (Lynch, 1979)
- Pristimantis pruinatus (Myers and Donnelly, 1996)
- Pristimantis pseudoacuminatus (Shreve, 1935)
- Pristimantis pteridophilus (Lynch and Duellman, 1997)
- Pristimantis ptochus (Lynch, 1998)
- Pristimantis pugnax (Lynch, 1973)
- Pristimantis puipui Lehr, von May, Moravec, and Cusi, 2017
- Pristimantis pulchridormientes Chávez and Catenazzi, 2016
- Pristimantis pulvinatus (Rivero, 1968)
- Pristimantis punzan Reyes-Puig, Reyes-Puig, Rámirez-Jaramillo, Pérez-L., and Yánez-Munoz, 2015 "2014"
- Pristimantis puruscafeum Reyes-Puig, Reyes-Puig, Rámirez-Jaramillo, Pérez-L., and Yánez-Munoz, 2015 "2014".
- Pristimantis pycnodermis (Lynch, 1979)
- Pristimantis pyrrhomerus (Lynch, 1976)

== Q ==
- Pristimantis quantus (Lynch, 1998)
- Pristimantis quaquaversus (Lynch, 1974)
- Pristimantis quicato Ospina-Sarria, Méndez-Narváez, Burbano-Yandi, and Bolívar-García, 2011
- Pristimantis quinquagesimus (Lynch and Trueb, 1980)
- Pristimantis quintanai Urgilés, Székely, Székely, Christodoulides, Sánchez-Nivicela, and Savage, 2019

== R ==
- Pristimantis racemus (Lynch, 1980)
- Pristimantis ramagii (Boulenger, 1888)
- Pristimantis reclusus (Lynch, 2003)
- Pristimantis reichlei Padial and De la Riva, 2009
- Pristimantis relictus Roberto, Loebmann, Lyra, Haddad, and Ávila, 2022
- Pristimantis renjiforum (Lynch, 2000)
- Pristimantis repens (Lynch, 1984)
- Pristimantis restrepoi (Lynch, 1996)
- Pristimantis reticulatus (Walker and Test, 1955)
- Pristimantis rhabdocnemus (Duellman and Hedges, 2005)
- Pristimantis rhabdolaemus (Duellman, 1978)
- Pristimantis rhigophilus (La Marca, 2007)
- Pristimantis rhodoplichus (Duellman and Wild, 1993)
- Pristimantis rhodostichus (Duellman and Pramuk, 1999)
- Pristimantis ridens (Cope, 1866)
- Pristimantis rivasi Barrio-Amorós, Rojas-Runjaic, and Barros, 2010
- Pristimantis riveroi (Lynch and La Marca, 1993)
- Pristimantis riveti (Despax, 1911)
- Pristimantis romanorum Yánez-Muñoz, Meza-Ramos, Cisneros-Heredia, and Reyes-Puig, 2011
- Pristimantis romeroae Ron, Carrión, Caminer, Sagredo, Navarrete, Ortega, Varela-Jaramillo, Vidal-Maldonado, and Terán, 2020
- Pristimantis roni Yanez-Munoz, Bejarano-Munoz, Brito-M., and Batallas-R., 2014
- Pristimantis rosadoi (Flores, 1988)
- Pristimantis roseus (Boulenger, 1918)
- Pristimantis royi (Morales, 2007)
- Pristimantis rozei (Rivero, 1961)
- Pristimantis rubicundus (Jiménez de la Espada, 1875)
- Pristimantis ruedai (Ruiz-Carranza, Lynch, and Ardila-Robayo, 1997)
- Pristimantis rufioculis (Duellman and Pramuk, 1999)
- Pristimantis rufoviridis Valencia, Yánez-Muñoz, Betancourt-Yépez, Terán-Valdez, and Guayasamin, 2011
- Pristimantis ruidus (Lynch, 1979)
- Pristimantis rupicola Taucce, Nascimento, Trevisan, Leite, Santana, Haddad, and Napoli, 2020

== S ==
- Pristimantis sacharuna Reyes-Puig, Reyes-Puig, Pérez-L., and Yánez-Muñoz, 2015
- Pristimantis sagedunneae P. Székely, D. Székely, Armijos-Ojeda, Hualpa-Vega & Vörös, 2023
- Pristimantis sagittulus (Lehr, Aguilar, and Duellman, 2004)
- Pristimantis salaputium (Duellman, 1978)
- Pristimantis saltissimus Means and Savage, 2007
- Pristimantis samaipatae (Köhler and Jungfer, 1995)
- Pristimantis samaniegoi Székely, Eguiguren, Ordóñez-Delgado, Armijos-Ojeda, and Székely, 2020
- Pristimantis sambalan Brito-M., Batallas-R., and Yánez-Muñoz, 2017
- Pristimantis sanguineus (Lynch, 1998)
- Pristimantis sarisarinama Barrio-Amorós and Brewer-Carias, 2008
- Pristimantis satagius (Lynch, 1995)
- Pristimantis saturninoi Brito-M., Batallas-R., and Yánez-Muñoz, 2017
- Pristimantis savagei (Pyburn and Lynch, 1981)
- Pristimantis schultei (Duellman, 1990)
- Pristimantis scitulus (Duellman, 1978)
- Pristimantis scoloblepharus (Lynch, 1991)
- Pristimantis scolodiscus (Lynch and Burrowes, 1990)
- Pristimantis scopaeus (Lynch, Ruiz-Carranza, and Ardila-Robayo, 1996)
- Pristimantis seorsus Lehr, 2007
- Pristimantis serendipitus (Duellman and Pramuk, 1999)
- Pristimantis shrevei (Schwartz, 1967)
- Pristimantis signifer (Ruiz-Carranza, Lynch, and Ardila-Robayo, 1997)
- Pristimantis silverstonei (Lynch and Ruiz-Carranza, 1996)
- Pristimantis simonbolivari (Wiens and Coloma, 1992)
- Pristimantis simonsii (Boulenger, 1900)
- Pristimantis simoteriscus (Lynch, Ruiz-Carranza, and Ardila-Robayo, 1997)
- Pristimantis simoterus (Lynch, 1980)
- Pristimantis sinschi Moravec, Lehr, and Kodejš, 2020
- Pristimantis siopelus (Lynch and Burrowes, 1990)
- Pristimantis sira Chávez, García Ayachi, and Catenazzi, 2021
- Pristimantis sirnigeli Yánez-Muñoz, Meza-Ramos, Cisneros-Heredia, and Reyes-Puig, 2011
- Pristimantis skydmainos (Flores and Rodriguez, 1997)
- Pristimantis sneiderni Ospina-Sarria and Duellman, 2019, Herpetologica, 75:
- Pristimantis sobetes (Lynch, 1980)
- Pristimantis spectabilis Duellman and Chaparro, 2008
- Pristimantis spilogaster (Lynch, 1984)
- Pristimantis spinosus (Lynch, 1979)
- Pristimantis stenodiscus (Walker and Test, 1955)
- Pristimantis sternothylax (Duellman and Wild, 1993)
- Pristimantis stictoboubonus (Duellman, Lehr, and Venegas, 2006)
- Pristimantis stictogaster (Duellman and Hedges, 2005)
- Pristimantis stictus González-Durán, 2016
- Pristimantis stipa Venegas and Duellman, 2012
- Pristimantis subsigillatus (Boulenger, 1902)
- Pristimantis suetus (Lynch and Rueda-Almonacid, 1998)
- Pristimantis sulculus (Lynch and Burrowes, 1990)
- Pristimantis supernatis (Lynch, 1979)
- Pristimantis surdus (Boulenger, 1882)
- Pristimantis susaguae (Rueda-Almonacid, Lynch, and Galvis-Peñuela, 2003)
- Pristimantis symptosus Köhler, Castillo-Urbina, Aguilar-Puntriano, Vences, and Glaw, 2022

== T ==
- Pristimantis taciturnus (Lynch and Suárez-Mayorga, 2003)
- Pristimantis taeniatus (Boulenger, 1912)
- Pristimantis tamsitti (Cochran and Goin, 1970)
- Pristimantis tantanti (Lehr, Torres-Gastello, and Suárez-Segovia, 2007)
- Pristimantis tanyrhynchus Lehr, 2007
- Pristimantis telefericus (La Marca, 2005)
- Pristimantis tenebrionis (Lynch and Miyata, 1980)
- Pristimantis terrapacis Ospina-Sarria and Angarita-Sierra, 2020
- Pristimantis teslai Páez and Ron, 2019
- Pristimantis thectopternus (Lynch, 1975)
- Pristimantis thyellus (La Marca, 2007)
- Pristimantis thymalopsoides (Lynch, 1976)
- Pristimantis thymelensis (Lynch, 1972)
- Pristimantis tiktik Székely, Eguiguren, Székely, Ordóñez-Delgado, Armijos-Ojeda, Riofrîo-Guamán, and Cogălniceanu, 2018
- Pristimantis tinajillas Urgilés, Sánchez-Nivicela, Nieves, and Yánez-Muñoz, 2014
- Pristimantis tinguichaca Brito-M., Ojala-Barbour, Batallas-R., and Almendáriz C., 2016
- Pristimantis toftae (Duellman, 1978)
- Pristimantis torrenticola (Lynch and Rueda-Almonacid, 1998)
- Pristimantis torresi Páez and Ron, 2019
- Pristimantis totoroi Páez and Ron, 2019
- Pristimantis trachyblepharis (Boulenger, 1918)
- Pristimantis tribulosus (Lynch and Rueda-Almonacid, 1997)
- Pristimantis truebae (Lynch and Duellman, 1997)
- Pristimantis tubernasus (Rivero, 1984)
- Pristimantis tungurahua Reyes-Puig, Yánez-Muñoz, Cisneros-Heredia, and Ramírez, 2011
- Pristimantis turik Barrio-Amorós, Rojas-Runjaic, and Infante-Rivero, 2008
- Pristimantis turpinorum (Hardy, 2001)
- Pristimantis turumiquirensis (Rivero, 1961)

== U ==
- Pristimantis uisae (Lynch, 2003)
- Pristimantis ujucami Zumel, Buckley, and Ron, 2021
- Pristimantis unistrigatus (Günther, 1859)
- Pristimantis urani Rivera-Correa and Daza-R., 2016
- Pristimantis uranobates (Lynch, 1991)
- Pristimantis urichi (Boettger, 1894)

== V ==
- Pristimantis vanadise (La Marca, 1984)
- Pristimantis variabilis (Lynch, 1968)
- Pristimantis veletis (Lynch and Rueda-Almonacid, 1997)
- Pristimantis ventrigranulosus Maciel, Vaz-Silva, Oliveira, and Padial, 2012
- Pristimantis ventriguttatus Lehr and Köhler, 2007
- Pristimantis ventrimarmoratus (Boulenger, 1912)
- Pristimantis ventristellatus Zumel, Buckley, and Ron, 2021
- Pristimantis verecundus (Lynch and Burrowes, 1990)
- Pristimantis verrucolatus Páez and Ron, 2019
- Pristimantis versicolor (Lynch, 1979)
- Pristimantis vertebralis (Boulenger, 1886)
- Pristimantis vicarius (Lynch and Ruiz-Carranza, 1983)
- Pristimantis vidua (Lynch, 1979)
- Pristimantis viejas (Lynch and Rueda-Almonacid, 1999)
- Pristimantis vilarsi (Melin, 1941)
- Pristimantis vilcabambae Lehr, 2007
- Pristimantis vinhai (Bokermann, 1975)
- Pristimantis viridicans (Lynch, 1977)
- Pristimantis viridis (Ruiz-Carranza, Lynch, and Ardila-Robayo, 1997)

== W ==
- Pristimantis w-nigrum (Boettger, 1892)
- Pristimantis wagteri (Venegas, 2007)
- Pristimantis walkeri (Lynch, 1974)
- Pristimantis waoranii (McCracken, Forstner, and Dixon, 2007)
- Pristimantis wiensi (Duellman and Wild, 1993)

== X ==
- Pristimantis xeniolum (Lynch, 2001)
- Pristimantis xestus (Lynch, 1995)
- Pristimantis xylochobates (Lynch and Ruiz-Carranza, 1996)

== Y ==
- Pristimantis yanezi Navarrete, Venegas, and Ron, 2016
- Pristimantis yantzaza Valencia, Dueñas, Székely, Batallas-R., and Pulluquitín, 2017
- Pristimantis yaviensis (Myers and Donnelly, 1996)
- Pristimantis yonke
- Pristimantis yukpa Barrio-Amorós, Rojas-Runjaic, and Infante-Rivero, 2008
- Pristimantis yumbo Yánez-Muñoz, Meza-Ramos, Cisneros-Heredia, and Reyes-Puig, 2011
- Pristimantis yuruaniensis Rödder and Jungfer, 2008
- Pristimantis yustizi (Barrio-Amorós and Chacón-Ortiz, 2004)

== Z ==
- Pristimantis zeuctotylus (Lynch and Hoogmoed, 1977)
- Pristimantis zimmermanae (Heyer and Hardy, 1991)
- Pristimantis zoilae (Mueses-Cisneros, 2007)
- Pristimantis zophus (Lynch and Ardila-Robayo, 1999)
- Pristimantis zorro Rivera-Correa and Daza-R., 2020
