= Pristimantis versicolor =

Conservation status
- Least Concern (IUCN 3.1)

Scientific classification
- Kingdom: Animalia
- Phylum: Chordata
- Class: Amphibia
- Order: Anura
- Clade: Brachycephaloidea
- Family: Craugastoridae
- Genus: Pristimantis
- Species: P. versicolor

Binomial name
- Pristimantis versicolor (Lynch, 1979)

Synonyms
- Eleutherodactylus versicolor Lynch, 1979

Species of frog

Pristimantis versicolor is a species of frog in the family Strabomantidae.

== Habitat and ecology ==
It is found in Ecuador and Peru. Its natural habitats are tropical moist montane forests, moist shrubland, and pastureland. Specimens are found beneath stones and logs in sparsely wooded pasture or in cloud forest and sub-páramo habitats . Peruvian specimens were collected at night on vegetation up to 2 m above the ground. It breeds by direct development, but the site of egg deposition is not known.

== Distribution ==
This species occurs in southern Ecuador and northern Peru. In Ecuador it is known from: the area north of San Lucas, in Loja Province, at 3,100m asl; at Abra Zamora at 2,500-2,800m asl; and at Curintza, Romerillos and Bombuscaro, in Zamora Chinchipe Province, at 2,100m asl. In Peru it occurs in Amazonas Province on the eastern slopes of the Cordillera del Cóndor and Upper Río Comainas at elevations of 665–1,750m asl. It probably occurs more widely than current records suggest. Biogeographic Realm(s): Neotropical Native Ecuador; Peru

== Threats ==
The main threat to this species is habitat loss and degradation due to agriculture, logging, mining, and human settlement.

== Conservation ==
The range of this species overlaps with the Santiago Comainas Reserve Zone, Peru. In Ecuador this species occurs in Parque Nacional Podocarpus.
