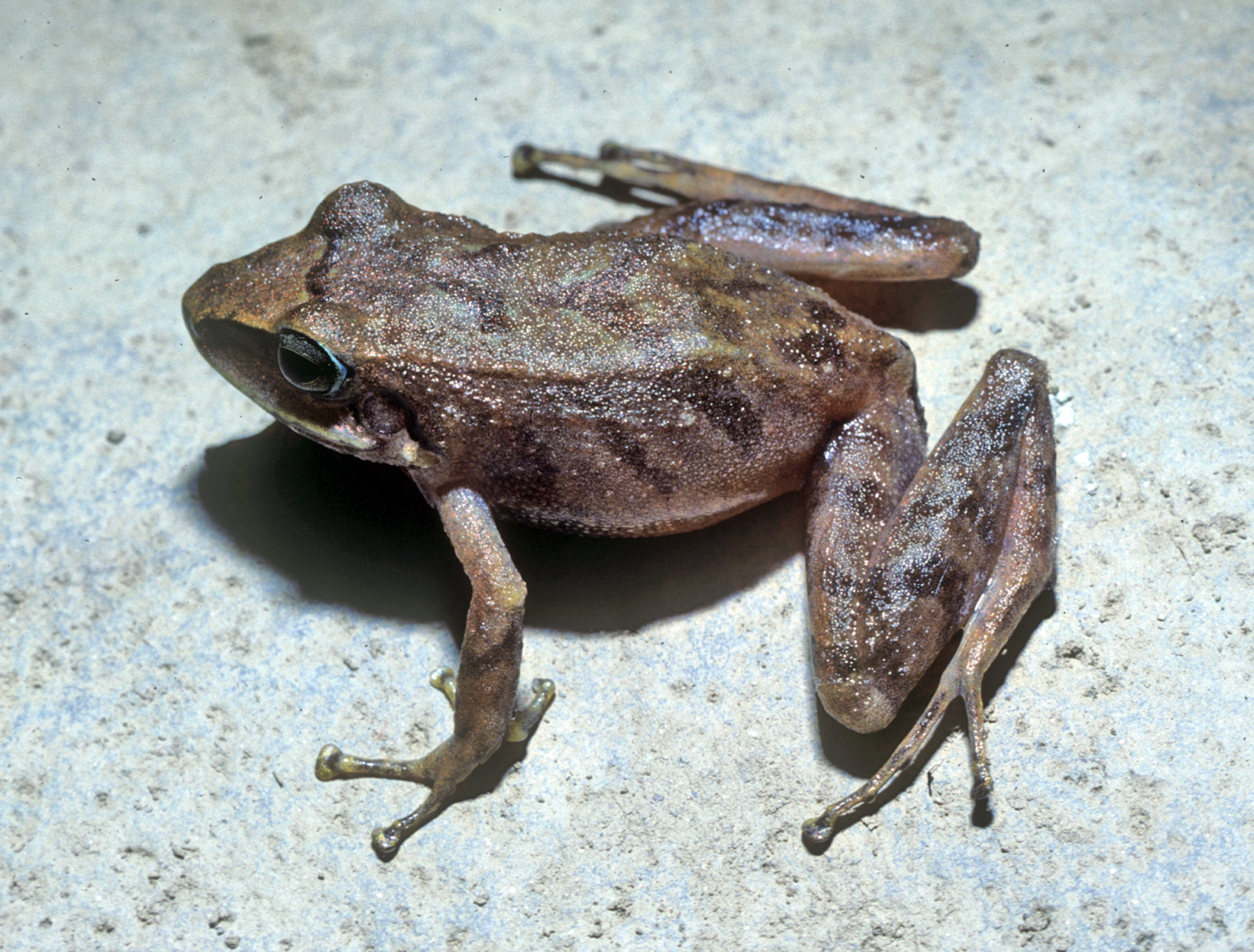

Conservation status
- Least Concern (IUCN 3.1)

Scientific classification
- Kingdom: Animalia
- Phylum: Chordata
- Class: Amphibia
- Order: Anura
- Family: Strabomantidae
- Genus: Pristimantis
- Species: P. rhabdolaemus

Binomial name
- Pristimantis rhabdolaemus (Duellman, 1978)

Synonyms
- Eleutherodactylus rhabdolaemus Duellman, 1978

= Pristimantis rhabdolaemus =

Species of frog

Pristimantis rhabdolaemus is a species of frog in the family Strabomantidae. It is endemic to the eastern slopes of the Andes in Peru. In 1987–2009 Eleutherodactylus pharangobates (now Pristimatis pharangobates) was included in this species. Its natural habitat are montane forests on the Amazonian slopes. This very common frog may be found perched on low vegetation.
