= Pristimantis llojsintuta =

Conservation status
- Least Concern (IUCN 3.1)

Scientific classification
- Kingdom: Animalia
- Phylum: Chordata
- Class: Amphibia
- Order: Anura
- Clade: Brachycephaloidea
- Family: Craugastoridae
- Genus: Pristimantis
- Species: P. llojsintuta

Binomial name
- Pristimantis llojsintuta (Köhler & Lötters, 1999)

Synonyms
- Eleutherodactylus llojsintuta Köhler & Lötters, 1999

Species of amphibian

Pristimantis llojsintuta is a species of frog in the family Strabomantidae. It is endemic to Bolivia. Its natural habitat is tropical moist montane forests.
