= Pristimantis taciturnus =

Conservation status
- Data Deficient (IUCN 3.1)

Scientific classification
- Kingdom: Animalia
- Phylum: Chordata
- Class: Amphibia
- Order: Anura
- Clade: Brachycephaloidea
- Family: Craugastoridae
- Genus: Pristimantis
- Species: P. taciturnus

Binomial name
- Pristimantis taciturnus (Lynch & Suárez-Mayorga, 2003)

Synonyms
- Eleutherodactylus taciturnus Lynch & Suárez-Mayorga, 2003

Species of amphibian

Pristimantis taciturnus is a species of frog in the family Strabomantidae.

It is endemic to Colombia. Its natural habitats are tropical moist montane forests and rivers. It is threatened by habitat loss.
