= Pristimantis scitulus =

Conservation status
- Data Deficient (IUCN 3.1)

Scientific classification
- Kingdom: Animalia
- Phylum: Chordata
- Class: Amphibia
- Order: Anura
- Family: Strabomantidae
- Genus: Pristimantis
- Species: P. scitulus

Binomial name
- Pristimantis scitulus (Duellman, 1978)

Synonyms
- Eleutherodactylus scitulus Duellman, 1978

Species of frog

Pristimantis scitulus is a species of frog in the family Strabomantidae. It is endemic to Peru. Its natural habitat is tropical moist montane forests.
