= Pristimantis melanoproctus =

Conservation status
- Data Deficient (IUCN 3.1)

Scientific classification
- Kingdom: Animalia
- Phylum: Chordata
- Class: Amphibia
- Order: Anura
- Clade: Brachycephaloidea
- Family: Craugastoridae
- Genus: Pristimantis
- Species: P. melanoproctus

Binomial name
- Pristimantis melanoproctus (Rivero, 1984)

Synonyms
- Eleutherodactylus melanoproctus Rivero, 1984 "1982"

Species of amphibian

Pristimantis melanoproctus is a species of frog in the family Strabomantidae.

It is found in Venezuela and possibly Colombia. Its natural habitat is tropical dry forests. It is threatened by habitat loss.
