= Pristimantis pirrensis =

Conservation status
- Near Threatened (IUCN 3.1)

Scientific classification
- Kingdom: Animalia
- Phylum: Chordata
- Class: Amphibia
- Order: Anura
- Family: Strabomantidae
- Genus: Pristimantis
- Species: P. pirrensis

Binomial name
- Pristimantis pirrensis (Ibáñez & Crawford, 2004)

Synonyms
- Eleutherodactylus pirrensis Ibáñez & Crawford, 2004

Species of amphibian

Pristimantis pirrensis is a species of frog in the family Strabomantidae.

It is endemic to Panama. Its natural habitat is tropical moist montane forests.
