= Pristimantis chalceus =

Conservation status
- Least Concern (IUCN 3.1)

Scientific classification
- Kingdom: Animalia
- Phylum: Chordata
- Class: Amphibia
- Order: Anura
- Family: Strabomantidae
- Genus: Pristimantis
- Species: P. chalceus

Binomial name
- Pristimantis chalceus (Peters, 1873)

Synonyms
- Eleutherodactylus chalceus (Peters, 1873)

Species of frog

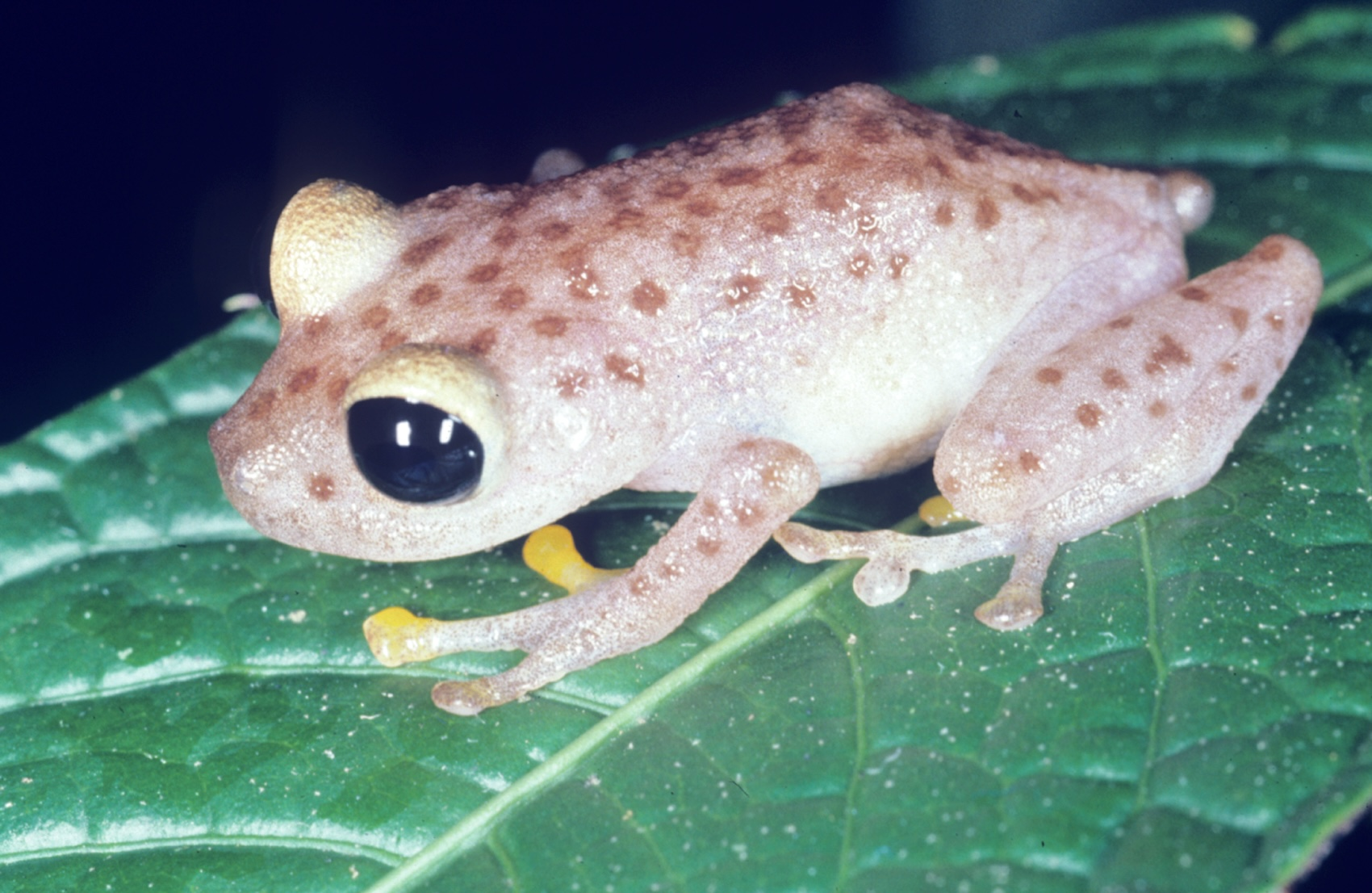
Pristimantis chalceus in 2000

Pristimantis chalceus is a species of frog in the family Strabomantidae. It is found in Colombia and Ecuador. Its natural habitats are tropical moist lowland forests, moist montane forests, rivers, and heavily degraded former forest. It is threatened by habitat loss.
