= Pristimantis croceoinguinis =

Conservation status
- Least Concern (IUCN 3.1)

Scientific classification
- Kingdom: Animalia
- Phylum: Chordata
- Class: Amphibia
- Order: Anura
- Family: Strabomantidae
- Genus: Pristimantis
- Subgenus: Pristimantis
- Species: P. croceoinguinis

Binomial name
- Pristimantis croceoinguinis (Lynch, 1968)

Synonyms
- Eleutherodactylus croceoinguinis Lynch, 1968

Species of frog

Pristimantis croceoinguinis is a species of frog in the family Strabomantidae. It is found in the lowland Amazon rainforest of southern Colombia, eastern Ecuador, and extreme north-eastern Peru, likely also extending into the adjacent Brazil. The specific name croceoinguinis refers to the color of the inguinal spots of this frog. Common name Santa Cecilia robber frog has been proposed for it.

== Description ==
Adult males measure 13–18 mm (0.5–0.7 in) and adult females 18–22 mm (0.7–0.9 in) in snout–vent length. The snout is subacuminate in dorsal view and round in lateral profile. The tympanum is hidden beneath the skin. The fingertips bear discs but no lateral fringes. The toe discs are slightly smaller than those of the fingers; no lateral fringes or webbing is present. Skin is dorsally pustulate. The dorsum is yellow-brown to brown, with dark brown spotting and white or yellow flecks. The sides are brown to black, blotched with darker brown and flecked with white or yellow. There are two yellow to reddish-orange spots on each side of the groin. The venter is gray to black but usually brown and has cream flecks. They have dark brown bars on a paler brown background. An anal triangle is similarly brown.

== Habitat and conservation ==
Pristimantis croceoinguinis occurs in lowland primary rainforest at elevations of 0–1,289 m (0–4,229 ft) above sea level. It can also be found in lightly disturbed habitats. It is nocturnal and can be found on low vegetation, some 0.5–1.5 m (2–5 ft) above the ground. Development is presumably direct (i.e., there is no free-living larval stage).

This species is not facing major threats. Large areas of suitable habitat remain, and it is also present in a number of protected areas.
