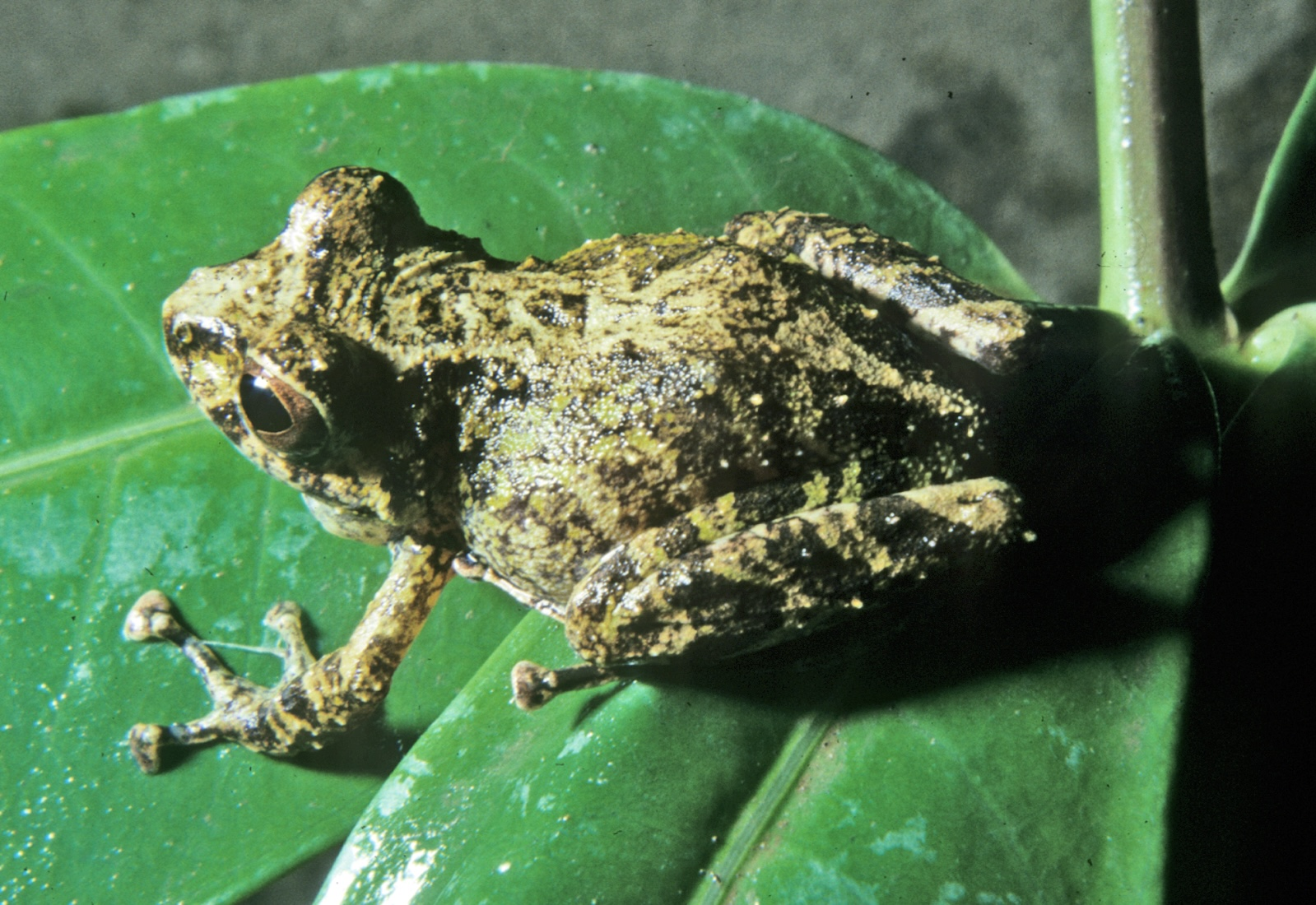
- Pristimantis wiensi

Conservation status
- Data Deficient (IUCN 3.1)

Scientific classification
- Kingdom: Animalia
- Phylum: Chordata
- Class: Amphibia
- Order: Anura
- Family: Strabomantidae
- Genus: Pristimantis
- Species: P. wiensi

Binomial name
- Pristimantis wiensi (Duellman & Wild, 1993)

Synonyms
- Eleutherodactylus wiensi Duellman & Wild, 1993

= Pristimantis wiensi =

Species of frog

Pristimantis wiensi is a species of frog in the family Strabomantidae. It is endemic to Peru. Its natural habitats are tropical moist montane forests, high-altitude grassland, and heavily degraded former forest.
