= Pristimantis mendax =

Conservation status
- Least Concern (IUCN 3.1)

Scientific classification
- Kingdom: Animalia
- Phylum: Chordata
- Class: Amphibia
- Order: Anura
- Family: Strabomantidae
- Genus: Pristimantis
- Species: P. mendax

Binomial name
- Pristimantis mendax (Duellman, 1978)

Synonyms
- Eleutherodactylus mendax Duellman, 1978

Species of frog

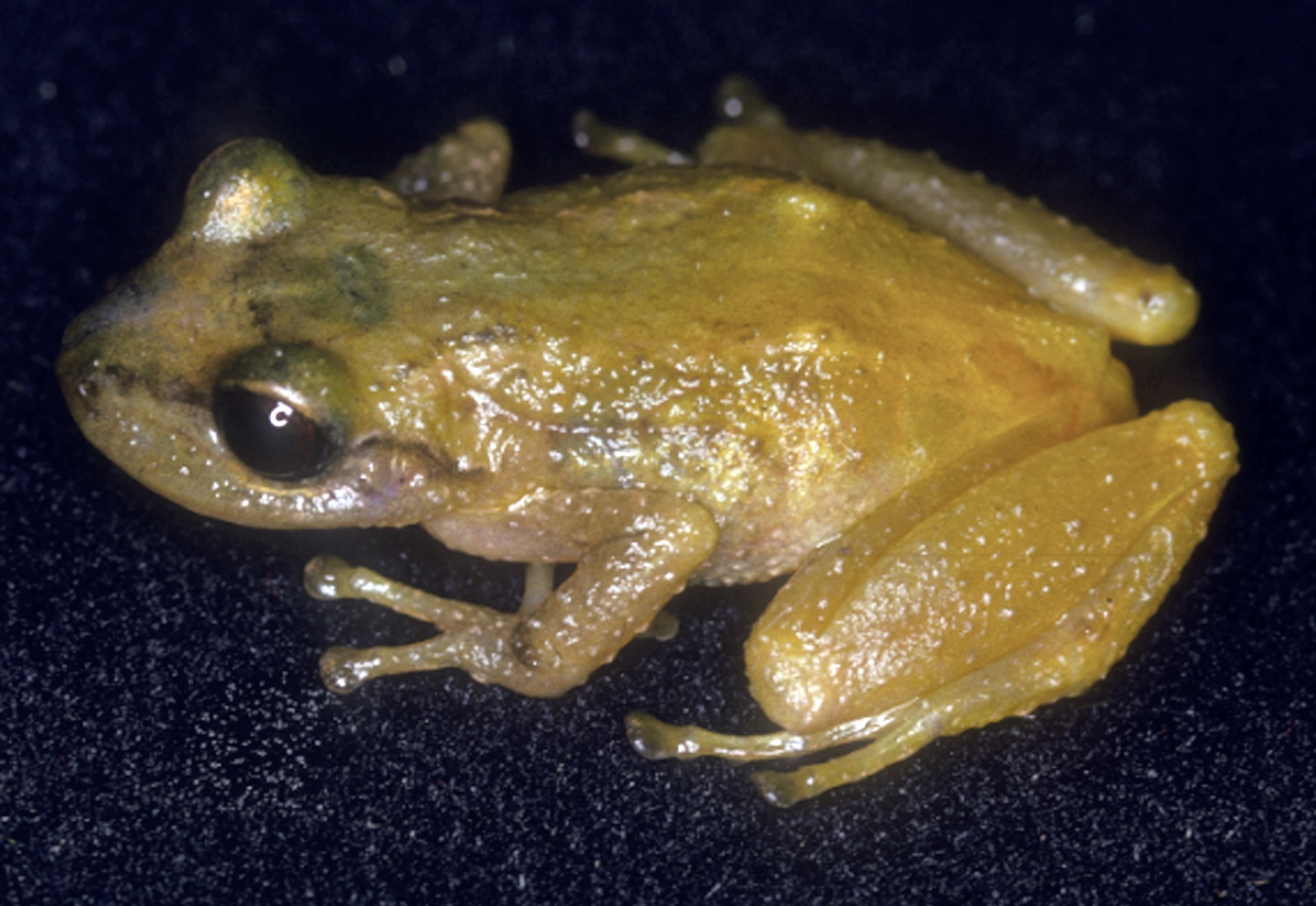
Pristimantis mendax

Pristimantis mendax is a species of frog in the family Strabomantidae. It is endemic to Peru. Its natural habitats are tropical moist lowland forests and moist montane forests.
