= Pristimantis sternothylax =

Conservation status
- Least Concern (IUCN 3.1)

Scientific classification
- Kingdom: Animalia
- Phylum: Chordata
- Class: Amphibia
- Order: Anura
- Family: Strabomantidae
- Genus: Pristimantis
- Species: P. sternothylax

Binomial name
- Pristimantis sternothylax (Duellman & Wild, 1993)

Synonyms
- Eleutherodactylus sternothylax Duellman & Wild, 1993

Species of frog

Pristimantis sternothylax is a species of frog in the family Strabomantidae. It is found on the Cordillera de Huancabamba, Cordillera Occidental, Cerro Aypate, and Cerro Toronche in northern Peru as well as in the Loja Province in southern Ecuador. Its natural habitats are humid montane forest.
