= Pristimantis batrachites =

Conservation status
- Endangered (IUCN 3.1)

Scientific classification
- Kingdom: Animalia
- Phylum: Chordata
- Class: Amphibia
- Order: Anura
- Clade: Brachycephaloidea
- Family: Craugastoridae
- Genus: Pristimantis
- Species: P. batrachites

Binomial name
- Pristimantis batrachites (Lynch, 2003)

Synonyms
- Eleutherodactylus batrachites Lynch, 2003

Species of amphibian

Pristimantis batrachites is a species of frogs in the family Strabomantidae.

It is endemic to Colombia. Its natural habitats are tropical moist montane forests. It is threatened by habitat loss.
