= Pristimantis acatallelus =

Conservation status
- Least Concern (IUCN 3.1)

Scientific classification
- Kingdom: Animalia
- Phylum: Chordata
- Class: Amphibia
- Order: Anura
- Clade: Brachycephaloidea
- Family: Craugastoridae
- Genus: Pristimantis
- Species: P. acatallelus

Binomial name
- Pristimantis acatallelus (Lynch & Ruíz-Carranza, 1983)

Synonyms
- Eleutherodactylus acatallelus Lynch & Ruiz-Carranza, 1983

Species of amphibian

Pristimantis acatallelus, also known as Cauca robber frog, is a species of frog in the family Strabomantidae. It is endemic to Colombia.

== Distribution and habitat ==
Pristimantis acatallelus is found in the Andes Mountains (Cordillera Central and Occidental) at elevations of between 1000 and 2680 m. It is a very common species found on vegetation in primary and secondary forests and forest edges.
