= Pristimantis erythropleura =

Conservation status
- Least Concern (IUCN 3.1)

Scientific classification
- Kingdom: Animalia
- Phylum: Chordata
- Class: Amphibia
- Order: Anura
- Family: Strabomantidae
- Genus: Pristimantis
- Species: P. erythropleura

Binomial name
- Pristimantis erythropleura (Boulenger, 1896)

Synonyms
- Eleutherodactylus erythropleura (Boulenger, 1896)

Species of frog

Pristimantis erythropleura is a species of frog in the family Strabomantidae. It is endemic to Colombia. Its natural habitats are tropical moist montane forests and heavily degraded former forest. It is threatened by habitat loss.
