= Pristimantis peruvianus =

Conservation status
- Least Concern (IUCN 3.1)

Scientific classification
- Kingdom: Animalia
- Phylum: Chordata
- Class: Amphibia
- Order: Anura
- Family: Strabomantidae
- Genus: Pristimantis
- Species: P. peruvianus

Binomial name
- Pristimantis peruvianus (Melin, 1941)

Synonyms
- Eleutherodactylus peruvianus (Melin, 1941)

Species of amphibian

Pristimantis peruvianus is a species of frog in the family Strabomantidae. It is found in the upper Amazon Basin in western Brazil, southern Ecuador, eastern Peru, and southeast Colombia. Records from Bolivia likely refer to an undescribed species, although it is possible that also the "true" Pristimantis peruvianus is to be found there. Its natural habitats are upland cloud forests, flooded lowland forests, and oxbow palm swamp forests. It is a common species.
