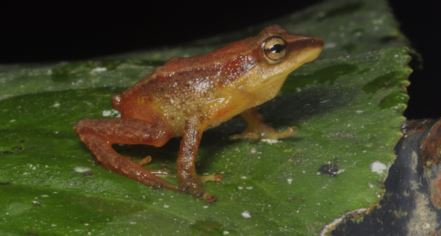

Conservation status
- Endangered (IUCN 3.1)

Scientific classification
- Kingdom: Animalia
- Phylum: Chordata
- Class: Amphibia
- Order: Anura
- Family: Strabomantidae
- Genus: Pristimantis
- Species: P. dorado

Binomial name
- Pristimantis dorado Rivera-Correa, Lamadrid-Feris, and Crawford, 2016

= Pristimantis dorado =

Species of frog

Pristimantis dorado is a species of frog in the family Strabomantidae. It is native to the forests of Colombia. The first specimen was found calling in roadside bushes in cloud forest near Chingaza National Natural Park at 2,650 m. The frog is less than 2 cm long and can be distinguished from closely related species by its metallic golden iris with a horizontal brown streak.
