= Pristimantis bicumulus =

Conservation status
- Vulnerable (IUCN 3.1)

Scientific classification
- Kingdom: Animalia
- Phylum: Chordata
- Class: Amphibia
- Order: Anura
- Family: Strabomantidae
- Genus: Pristimantis
- Species: P. bicumulus

Binomial name
- Pristimantis bicumulus (Peters, 1863)

Synonyms
- Eleutherodactylus bicumulus (Peters, 1863); Eleutherodactylus orocostalis Rivero, 1961; Eleutherodactylus racenisi Rivero, 1961

Species of frog

Pristimantis bicumulus, the Caracas robber frog, is a species of frog in the family Strabomantidae. It is endemic to Venezuela. Its natural habitat is tropical moist montane forests. It is threatened by habitat loss.
