= Pristimantis trachyblepharis =

Conservation status
- Least Concern (IUCN 3.1)

Scientific classification
- Kingdom: Animalia
- Phylum: Chordata
- Class: Amphibia
- Order: Anura
- Family: Strabomantidae
- Genus: Pristimantis
- Species: P. trachyblepharis

Binomial name
- Pristimantis trachyblepharis (Boulenger, 1918)

Synonyms
- Eleutherodactylus trachyblepharis (Boulenger, 1918)

Species of frog

Pristimantis trachyblepharis is a species of frog in the family Strabomantidae. It is endemic to Ecuador. Its natural habitats are tropical moist lowland forests and moist montane forests. It is threatened by habitat loss.
