= Pristimantis chloronotus =

Conservation status
- Least Concern (IUCN 3.1)

Scientific classification
- Kingdom: Animalia
- Phylum: Chordata
- Class: Amphibia
- Order: Anura
- Clade: Brachycephaloidea
- Family: Craugastoridae
- Genus: Pristimantis
- Species: P. chloronotus

Binomial name
- Pristimantis chloronotus (Lynch, 1969)

Synonyms
- Eleutherodactylus chloronotus Lynch, 1969

Species of amphibian

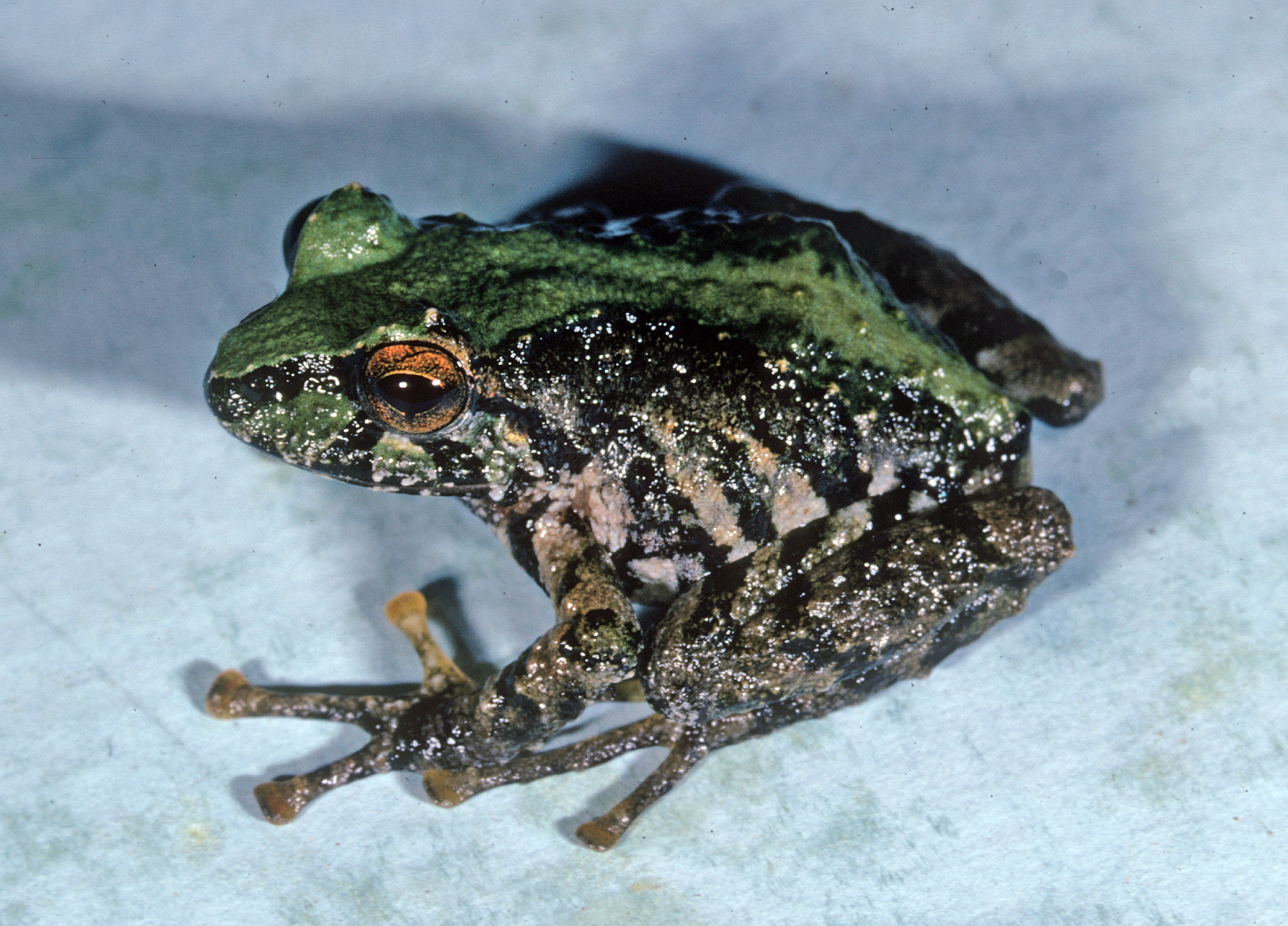
Pristimantis chloronotus

Pristimantis chloronotus is a species of frog in the family Strabomantidae.

It is found in Colombia and Ecuador. Its natural habitats are tropical moist montane forests, high-altitude shrubland, and high-altitude grassland. It is threatened by habitat loss.
