= Pristimantis subsigillatus =

Conservation status
- Least Concern (IUCN 3.1)

Scientific classification
- Kingdom: Animalia
- Phylum: Chordata
- Class: Amphibia
- Order: Anura
- Family: Strabomantidae
- Genus: Pristimantis
- Species: P. subsigillatus

Binomial name
- Pristimantis subsigillatus (Boulenger, 1902)

Synonyms
- Hylodes subsigillatus Boulenger, 1902; Eleutherodactylus subsigillatus (Boulenger, 1902)

Species of frog

Pristimantis subsigillatus is a species of frog in the family Strabomantidae. It is found in the lowlands in south-western Colombia (western flank of the Colombian Massif) and western Ecuador (west of the Andes) up to elevations of 1,162 m (3,812 ft) asl. It is sometimes known as Salidero robber frog (after its type locality) or engraved rainfrog.

== Description ==
Male Pristimantis subsigillatus grow to a snout–vent length of 19–29 mm (0.75–1.14 in) and females to 30–33 mm (1.2–1.3 in). Skin of dorsum is smooth or very finely shagreened. Colour varies from pale green to light reddish brown. Ventral surfaces are white to pale yellow with brown flecks.

== Habitat and conservation ==
Pristimantis subsigillatus is an arboreal frog found in tropical moist lowland forests, often near streams and rivers. It is usually encountered at night on medium to high bushes and in arboreal bromeliads. During the day, it shelters in bromeliad axils.

While locally common, the arboreal lifestyle (up to 10 meters above ground) of this frog makes it difficult to find. It may be more easily heard than seen. The call is a single, sharp, explosive "tweet".

Pristimantis subsigillatus is potentially threatened by habitat loss and pollution.
