= Pristimantis pleurostriatus =

Conservation status
- Data Deficient (IUCN 3.1)

Scientific classification
- Kingdom: Animalia
- Phylum: Chordata
- Class: Amphibia
- Order: Anura
- Clade: Brachycephaloidea
- Family: Craugastoridae
- Genus: Pristimantis
- Species: P. pleurostriatus

Binomial name
- Pristimantis pleurostriatus (Rivero, 1982)

Synonyms
- Eleutherodactylus pleurostriatus Rivero, 1984

Species of frog

Pristimantis pleurostriatus is a species of frog in the family Strabomantidae. It is endemic to Venezuela. Its natural habitat is tropical moist montane forests.
