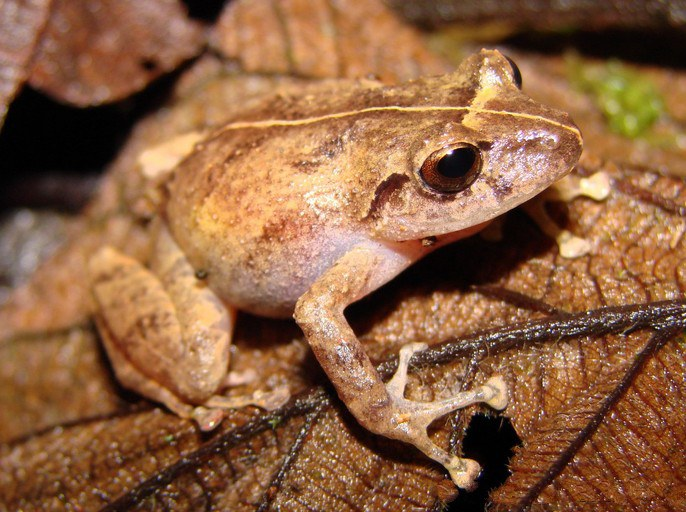

Conservation status
- Least Concern (IUCN 3.1)

Scientific classification
- Kingdom: Animalia
- Phylum: Chordata
- Class: Amphibia
- Order: Anura
- Family: Strabomantidae
- Genus: Pristimantis
- Species: P. palmeri

Binomial name
- Pristimantis palmeri (Boulenger, 1912)

Synonyms
- Eleutherodactylus palmeri (Boulenger, 1912)

= Pristimantis palmeri =

Species of frog

Pristimantis palmeri is a species of frog in the family Strabomantidae. It is endemic to Colombia. Its natural habitats are tropical moist montane forests, rural gardens, and heavily degraded former forest. It is threatened by habitat loss.
