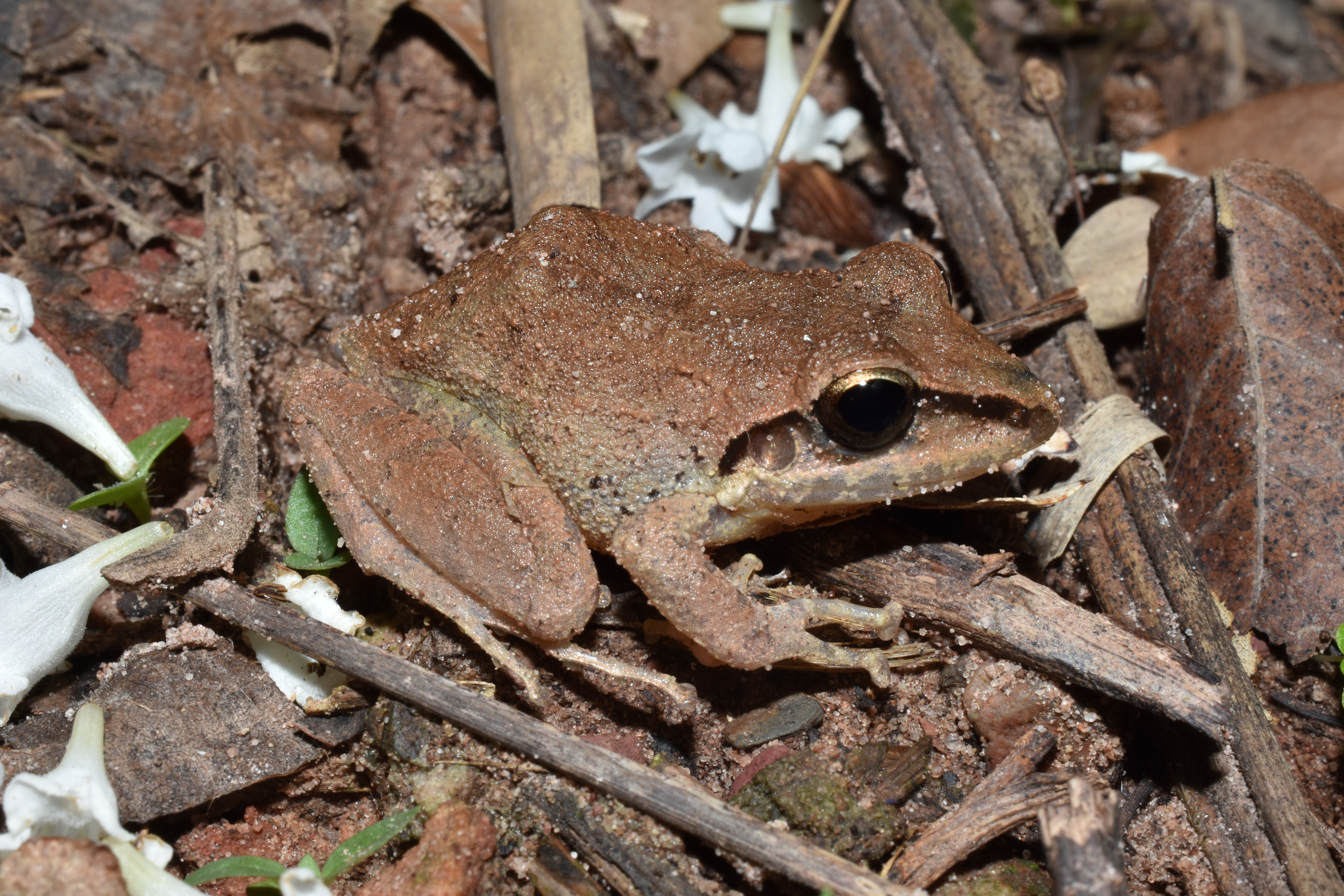
- adult from Florida Province, Bolivia

Conservation status
- Least Concern (IUCN 3.1)

Scientific classification
- Kingdom: Animalia
- Phylum: Chordata
- Class: Amphibia
- Order: Anura
- Clade: Brachycephaloidea
- Family: Craugastoridae
- Genus: Pristimantis
- Species: P. samaipatae

Binomial name
- Pristimantis samaipatae (Köhler & Jungfer, 1995)

Synonyms
- Eleutherodactylus samaipatae Köhler & Jungfer, 1995

= Pristimantis samaipatae =

Species of frog

Pristimantis samaipatae is a species of frog in the family Strabomantidae. It is found in the Santa Cruz and Tarija Departments of eastern Bolivia and in adjacent Argentina. Its natural habitats are semi-humid montane forests. It is a common frog that is not threatened.
