= Pristimantis leucopus =

Conservation status
- Endangered (IUCN 3.1)

Scientific classification
- Kingdom: Animalia
- Phylum: Chordata
- Class: Amphibia
- Order: Anura
- Clade: Brachycephaloidea
- Family: Craugastoridae
- Genus: Pristimantis
- Species: P. leucopus

Binomial name
- Pristimantis leucopus (Lynch, 1976)

Synonyms
- Eleutherodactylus leucopus Lynch, 1976

Species of frog

Pristimantis leucopus is a species of frog in the family Strabomantidae. It is found in Colombia and Ecuador. Its natural habitat is tropical moist montane forest. It is threatened by habitat loss.
