= Pristimantis brevifrons =

Conservation status
- Least Concern (IUCN 3.1)

Scientific classification
- Kingdom: Animalia
- Phylum: Chordata
- Class: Amphibia
- Order: Anura
- Clade: Brachycephaloidea
- Family: Craugastoridae
- Genus: Pristimantis
- Species: P. brevifrons

Binomial name
- Pristimantis brevifrons (Lynch, 1981)

Synonyms
- Eleutherodactylus brevifrons Lynch, 1981

Species of frog

Pristimantis brevifrons is a species of frog in the family Strabomantidae. It is endemic to Colombia. Its natural habitats are tropical moist montane forests, high-altitude shrubland and grassland, rivers, pastureland, rural gardens, and heavily degraded former forest. It is threatened by habitat loss.
