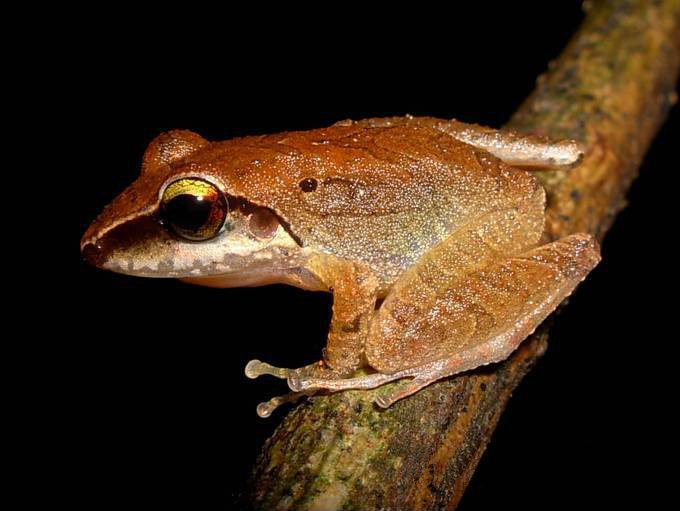

Conservation status
- Least Concern (IUCN 3.1)

Scientific classification
- Kingdom: Animalia
- Phylum: Chordata
- Class: Amphibia
- Order: Anura
- Clade: Brachycephaloidea
- Family: Craugastoridae
- Genus: Pristimantis
- Species: P. incertus

Binomial name
- Pristimantis incertus Lutz, 1927

Synonyms
- Hylodes incertus Lutz, 1927; Eleutherodactylus incertus Lutz, 1927; Hylodes anonymus Lutz, 1927; Eleutherodactylus terraebolivaris Rivero, 1961; Pristimantis terraebolivaris (Rivero, 1961)

= Pristimantis incertus =

Species of amphibian

Pristimantis incertus is a species of frogs in the family Strabomantidae. It is endemic to northern Venezuela where it is only known from its (presumed) type locality near La Guaira. Its natural habitats are tropical moist lowland forests and moist montane forests.
