= Pristimantis briceni =

Conservation status
- Endangered (IUCN 3.1)

Scientific classification
- Kingdom: Animalia
- Phylum: Chordata
- Class: Amphibia
- Order: Anura
- Family: Strabomantidae
- Genus: Pristimantis
- Species: P. briceni

Binomial name
- Pristimantis briceni (Boulenger, 1903)

Synonyms
- Eleutherodactylus briceni (Boulenger, 1903)

Species of frog

Pristimantis briceni is a species of frog in the family Strabomantidae. It is endemic to Venezuela. Its natural habitats are tropical moist lowland forests, moist montane forests, and high-altitude grassland.
