= Pristimantis latidiscus =

Conservation status
- Least Concern (IUCN 3.1)

Scientific classification
- Kingdom: Animalia
- Phylum: Chordata
- Class: Amphibia
- Order: Anura
- Family: Strabomantidae
- Genus: Pristimantis
- Species: P. latidiscus

Binomial name
- Pristimantis latidiscus (Boulenger, 1898)

Synonyms
- Hylodes latidiscus Boulenger, 1898; Eleutherodactylus latidiscus (Boulenger, 1898)

Species of frog

Pristimantis latidiscus is a species of frog in the family Strabomantidae. It is found in Colombia, Ecuador, and possibly Panama. Its natural habitats are tropical moist lowland forests and moist montane forests. It is threatened by habitat loss.
