= Pristimantis cajamarcensis =

Conservation status
- Least Concern (IUCN 3.1)

Scientific classification
- Kingdom: Animalia
- Phylum: Chordata
- Class: Amphibia
- Order: Anura
- Clade: Brachycephaloidea
- Family: Craugastoridae
- Genus: Pristimantis
- Species: P. cajamarcensis

Binomial name
- Pristimantis cajamarcensis Barbour & Noble, 1920

Synonyms
- Eleutherodactylus cajamarcensis Barbour and Noble, 1920

Species of frog

Pristimantis cajamarcensis is a species of frog in the family Strabomantidae. It is found in Ecuador and Peru. Its natural habitats are tropical moist montane forests, pastureland, rural gardens, and heavily degraded former forest. It is threatened by habitat loss.
