= Pristimantis imitatrix =

Conservation status
- Least Concern (IUCN 3.1)

Scientific classification
- Kingdom: Animalia
- Phylum: Chordata
- Class: Amphibia
- Order: Anura
- Family: Strabomantidae
- Genus: Pristimantis
- Species: P. imitatrix

Binomial name
- Pristimantis imitatrix (Duellman, 1978)

Synonyms
- Eleutherodactylus imitatrix Duellman, 1978

Species of frog

Pristimantis imitatrix is a species of frog in the family Strabomantidae. It is found in Peru and possibly Bolivia. Its natural habitats are tropical moist lowland forests and rivers.
