= Pristimantis skydmainos =

Conservation status
- Least Concern (IUCN 3.1)

Scientific classification
- Kingdom: Animalia
- Phylum: Chordata
- Class: Amphibia
- Order: Anura
- Family: Strabomantidae
- Genus: Pristimantis
- Species: P. skydmainos

Binomial name
- Pristimantis skydmainos Flores & Rodrìguez, 1997

Synonyms
- Eleutherodactylus skydmainos Flores & Rodrìguez, 1997; Eleutherodactylus karcharias Flores & Rodrìguez, 1997

Species of amphibian

Pristimantis skydmainos is a species of frog in the family Strabomantidae.

It is found in the Amazonian lowlands in central and southern Peru, Bolivia, and extreme western Brazil, and on the lower Amazonian slopes of Peru and Ecuador. Its natural habitats are subtropical or tropical moist lowland forests and subtropical or tropical moist montane forests.
