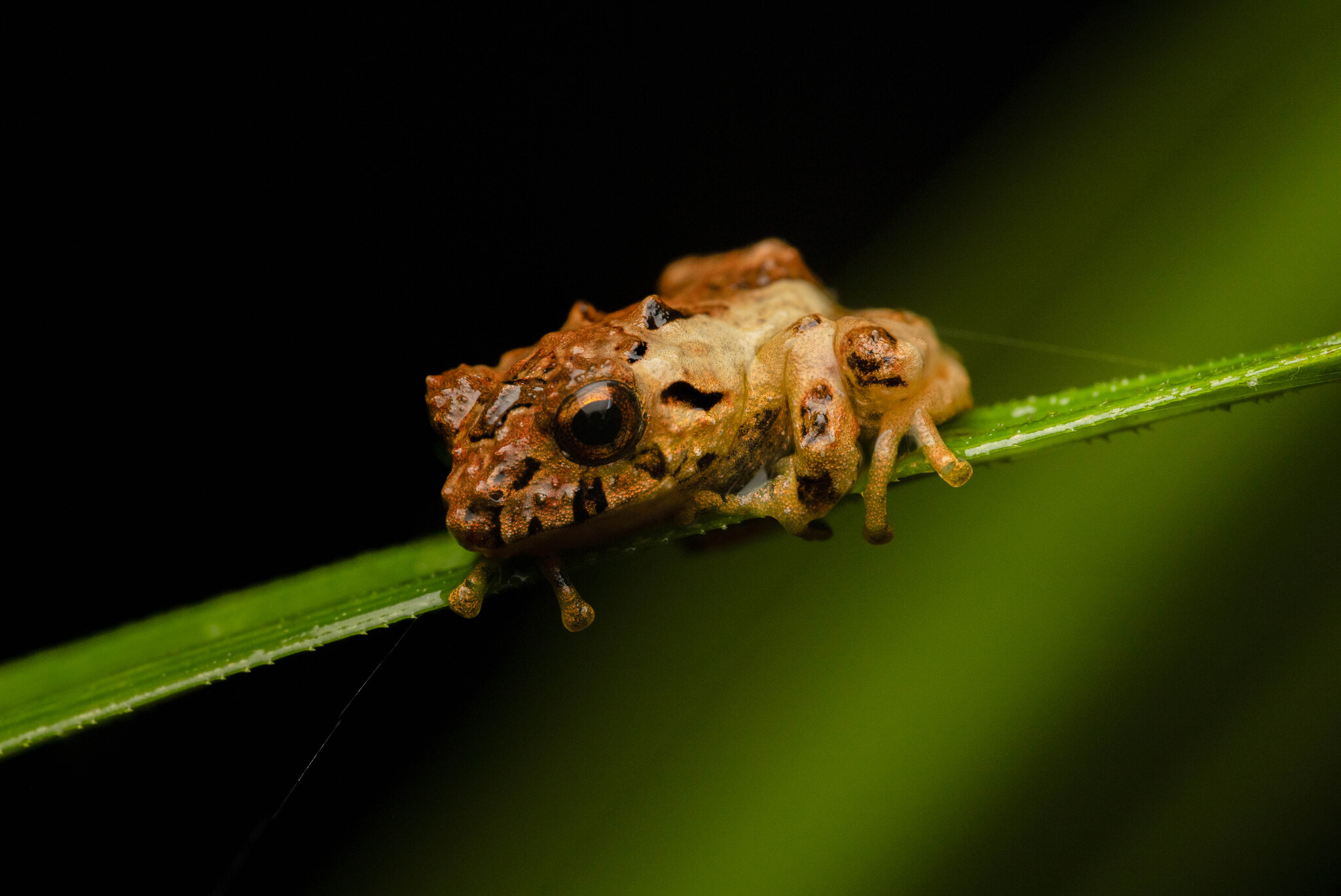

Conservation status
- Least Concern (IUCN 3.1)

Scientific classification
- Kingdom: Animalia
- Phylum: Chordata
- Class: Amphibia
- Order: Anura
- Clade: Brachycephaloidea
- Family: Craugastoridae
- Genus: Pristimantis
- Species: P. platydactylus

Binomial name
- Pristimantis platydactylus (Boulenger, 1903)

Synonyms
- Eleutherodactylus platydactylus (Boulenger, 1903); Eleutherodactylus bockermanni Donoso-Barros, 1970

= Pristimantis platydactylus =

Species of frog

Pristimantis platydactylus is a species of frog in the family Strabomantidae. It is found in Bolivia and Peru. Its natural habitats are tropical moist lowland forests, moist montane forests, high-altitude shrubland, and heavily degraded former forest. It is threatened by habitat loss.
