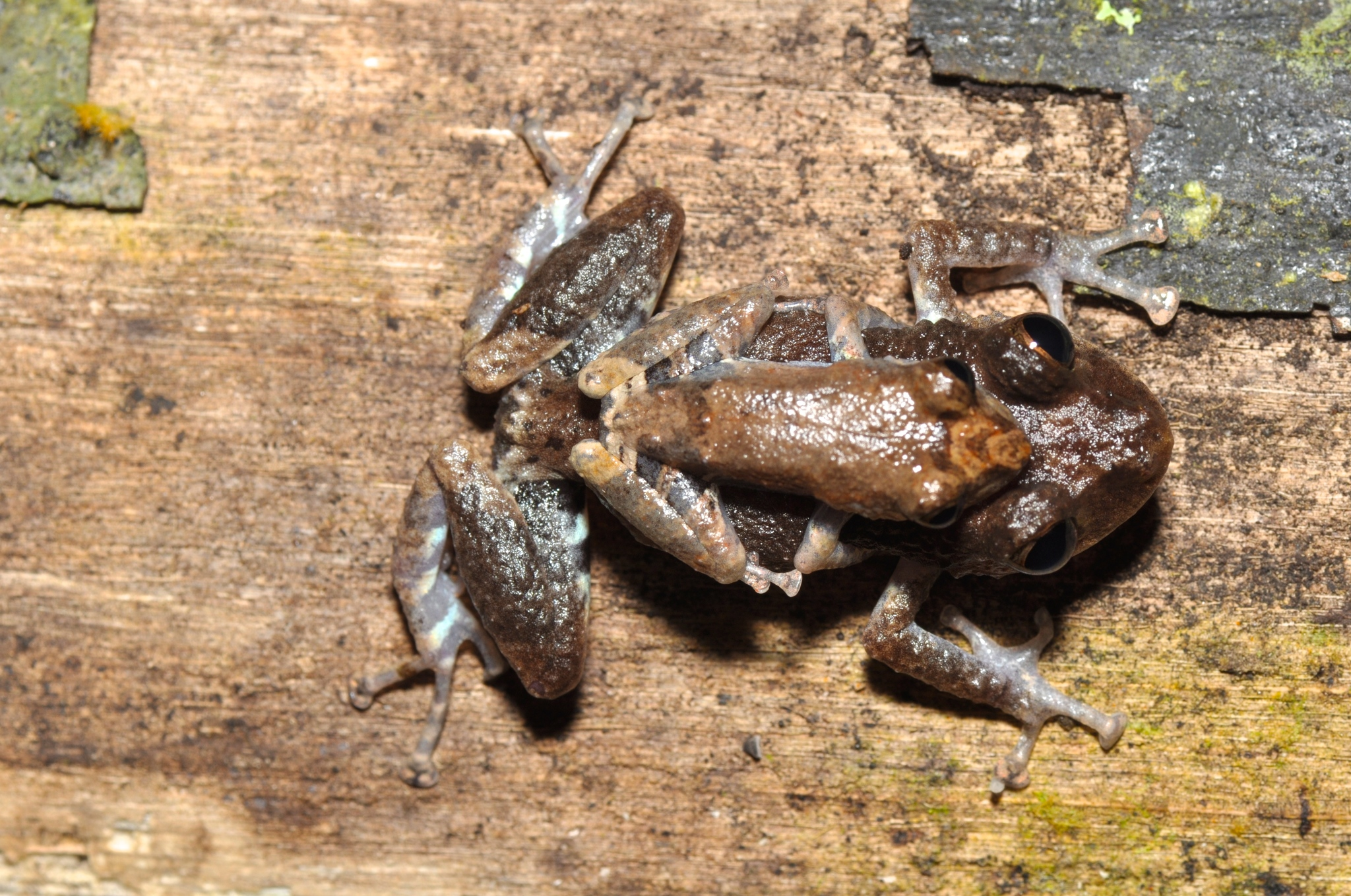

Conservation status
- Least Concern (IUCN 3.1)

Scientific classification
- Kingdom: Animalia
- Phylum: Chordata
- Class: Amphibia
- Order: Anura
- Family: Strabomantidae
- Genus: Pristimantis
- Species: P. altamazonicus

Binomial name
- Pristimantis altamazonicus (Barbour and Dunn, 1921)

Synonyms
- Eleutherodactylus altamazonicus Barbour and Dunn, 1921

= Pristimantis altamazonicus =

Species of frog

Pristimantis altamazonicus is a species of frog in the family Strabomantidae. As currently defined, it is known from the Amazon rainforest of Colombia, Ecuador, and Peru.

== Taxonomy ==
Following a study by Ortega-Andrade and colleagues published in 2017, Pristimantis brevicrus (Andersson, 1945), thought to be a synonym of Pristimantis altamazonicus, was resurrected. Furthermore, specimens from Brazil and Bolivia traditionally referred to this species were found to represent other, as yet undescribed species.

== Description ==
Adult males measure 17–20 mm (0.67–0.79 in) and females 28–30 mm (1.1–1.2 in) in snout–vent length. The snout is moderately short and sub-acuminate. Dorsal skin of dorsum smooth, but has small, scattered tubercles in males. Neither fingers nor toes are webbed but they do have lateral fringes. The dorsum and flanks are brown and have reddish and black stains. There is a clear, W-shaped mark in scapular region. There can also be longitudinal cream stripes and dark blotches.

== Habitat and conservation ==
Pristimantis altamazonicus occur in closed-canopy, primary tropical forests, and occasionally in flooded or secondary forests. While they may be found in leaf-litter during the day, they are more typically perched on, and call from, low vegetation in the forest at night. The altitudinal range is 74–1,462 m (243–4,797 ft) above sea level Although habitat loss can be a local threat, Pristimantis altamazonicus as a species is not facing major threats.
