= Pristimantis stenodiscus =

Conservation status
- Critically Endangered (IUCN 3.1)

Scientific classification
- Kingdom: Animalia
- Phylum: Chordata
- Class: Amphibia
- Order: Anura
- Family: Strabomantidae
- Genus: Pristimantis
- Species: P. stenodiscus

Binomial name
- Pristimantis stenodiscus (Walker & Test, 1955)

Synonyms
- Eleutherodactylus stenodiscus Walker and Test, 1955

Species of frog

Pristimantis stenodiscus is a species of frog in the family Strabomantidae. It is endemic to Venezuela. Its natural habitat is tropical moist montane forests.
