= Pristimantis paululus =

Conservation status
- Least Concern (IUCN 3.1)

Scientific classification
- Kingdom: Animalia
- Phylum: Chordata
- Class: Amphibia
- Order: Anura
- Clade: Brachycephaloidea
- Family: Craugastoridae
- Genus: Pristimantis
- Species: P. paululus

Binomial name
- Pristimantis paululus (Lynch, 1974)

Synonyms
- Eleutherodactylus paululus Lynch, 1974

Species of frog

Pristimantis paululus is a species of frog in the family Strabomantidae. It is found in Ecuador, possibly Colombia, and possibly Peru. Its natural habitat is tropical moist lowland forests. It is threatened by habitat loss.
