= Pristimantis huicundo =

Conservation status
- Endangered (IUCN 3.1)

Scientific classification
- Kingdom: Animalia
- Phylum: Chordata
- Class: Amphibia
- Order: Anura
- Family: Strabomantidae
- Genus: Pristimantis
- Species: P. huicundo

Binomial name
- Pristimantis huicundo (Guayasamin, Almeida-Reinoso & Nogales-Sornosa, 2004)

Synonyms
- Eleutherodactylus huicundo Guayasamin, Almeida-Reinoso & Nogales-Sornosa, 2004

Species of amphibian

Pristimantis huicundo is a species of frog in the family Strabomantidae.

It is found in Ecuador and possibly Colombia. Its natural habitats are tropical moist montane forests and high-altitude grassland. It is threatened by habitat loss.
