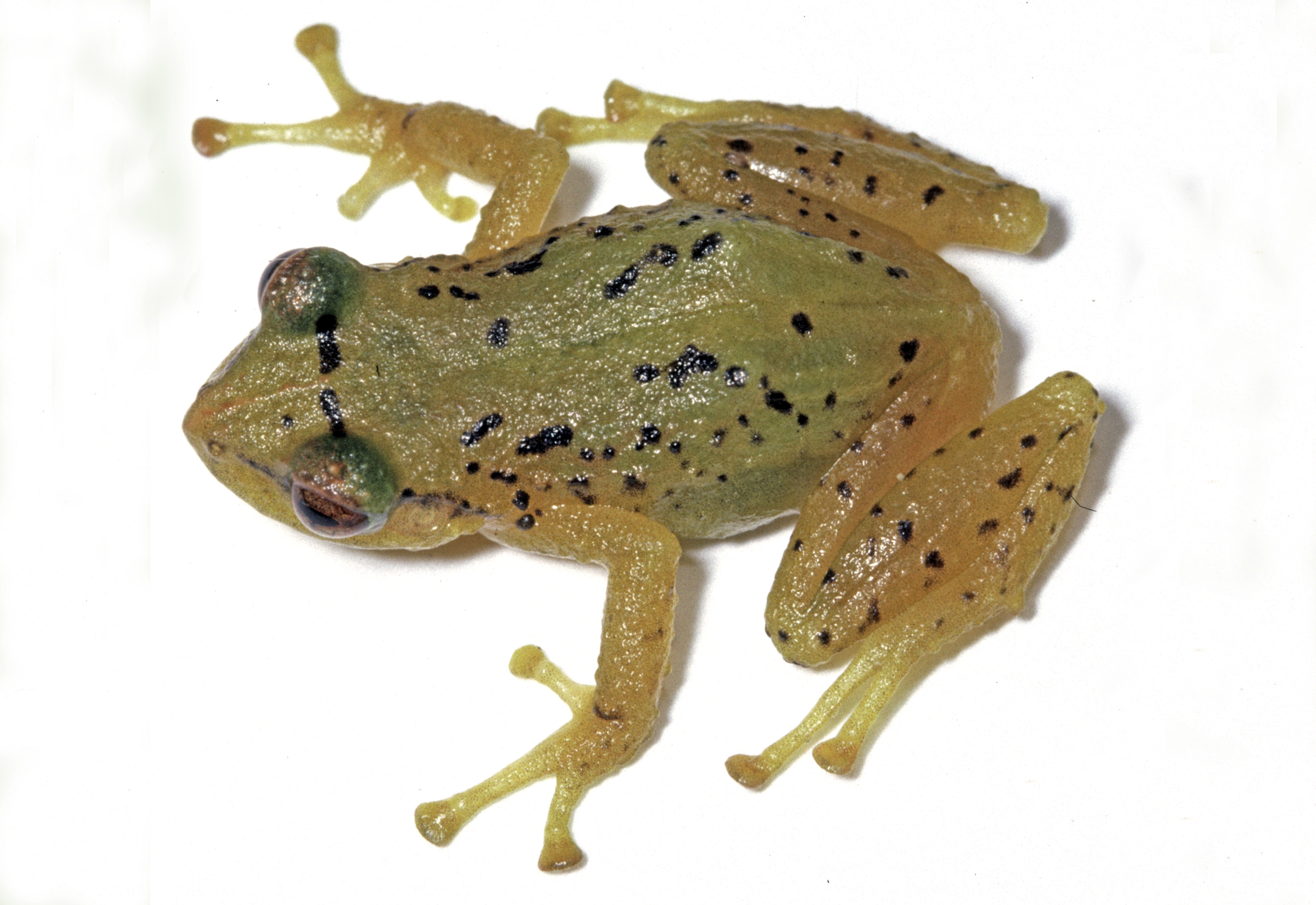

Conservation status
- Least Concern (IUCN 3.1)

Scientific classification
- Kingdom: Animalia
- Phylum: Chordata
- Class: Amphibia
- Order: Anura
- Clade: Brachycephaloidea
- Family: Craugastoridae
- Genus: Pristimantis
- Species: P. aniptopalmatus

Binomial name
- Pristimantis aniptopalmatus (Duellman & Hedges, 2005)

Synonyms
- Eleutherodactylus aniptopalmatus Duellman & Hedges, 2005

= Pristimantis aniptopalmatus =

Species of amphibian

Pristimantis aniptopalmatus is a species of frog in the family Strabomantidae.

It is endemic to Peru. Its natural habitat is tropical moist montane forests.
