= Pristimantis olivaceus =

Conservation status
- Least Concern (IUCN 3.1)

Scientific classification
- Kingdom: Animalia
- Phylum: Chordata
- Class: Amphibia
- Order: Anura
- Clade: Brachycephaloidea
- Family: Craugastoridae
- Genus: Pristimantis
- Species: P. olivaceus

Binomial name
- Pristimantis olivaceus (Kohler, Morales, Lotters, Reichle & Aparicio, 1998)

Synonyms
- Eleutherodactylus olivaceus Kohler, Morales, Lotters, Reichle & Aparicio, 1998

Species of frog

Pristimantis olivaceus is a species of frog in the family Strabomantidae. It is found in Bolivia and Peru. Its natural habitats are tropical moist lowland forests and moist montane forests.
