= Pristimantis hectus =

Conservation status
- Vulnerable (IUCN 3.1)

Scientific classification
- Kingdom: Animalia
- Phylum: Chordata
- Class: Amphibia
- Order: Anura
- Clade: Brachycephaloidea
- Family: Craugastoridae
- Genus: Pristimantis
- Species: P. hectus

Binomial name
- Pristimantis hectus (Lynch & Burrowes, 1990)

Synonyms
- Eleutherodactylus hectus Lynch & Burrowes, 1990

Species of frog

Pristimantis hectus is a species of frog in the family Strabomantidae. It is found in Colombia and Ecuador. Its natural habitat is tropical moist montane forests. It is threatened by habitat loss.
