= Pristimantis restrepoi =

Conservation status
- Least Concern (IUCN 3.1)

Scientific classification
- Kingdom: Animalia
- Phylum: Chordata
- Class: Amphibia
- Order: Anura
- Clade: Brachycephaloidea
- Family: Craugastoridae
- Genus: Pristimantis
- Species: P. restrepoi

Binomial name
- Pristimantis restrepoi (Lynch, 1996)

Synonyms
- Eleutherodactylus restrepoi Lynch, 1996

Species of frog

Pristimantis restrepoi is a species of frog in the family Strabomantidae. It is endemic to Colombia. Its natural habitats are tropical moist montane forests, rural gardens, and heavily degraded former forest.
