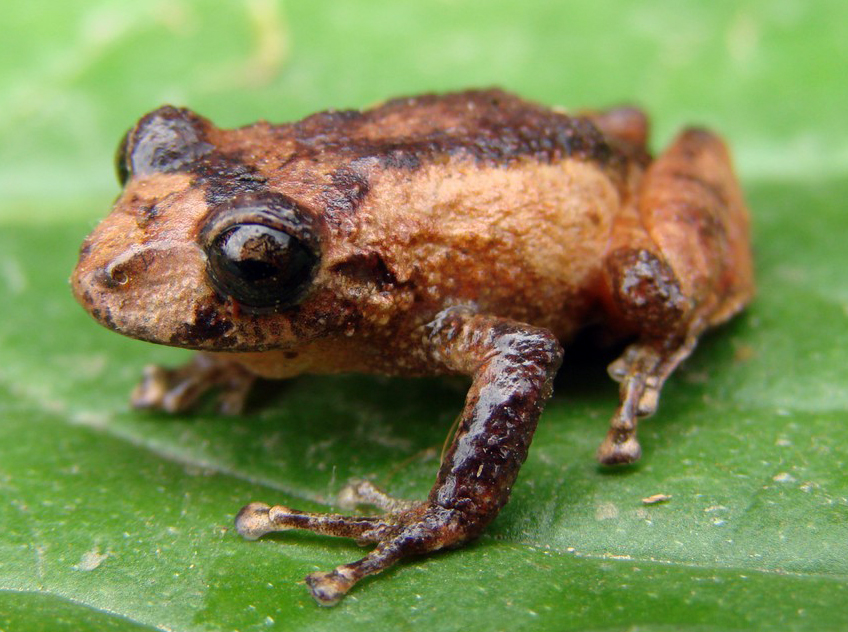

Conservation status
- Least Concern (IUCN 3.1)

Scientific classification
- Kingdom: Animalia
- Phylum: Chordata
- Class: Amphibia
- Order: Anura
- Family: Strabomantidae
- Genus: Pristimantis
- Species: P. bogotensis

Binomial name
- Pristimantis bogotensis (Peters, 1863)

Synonyms
- Eleutherodactylus bogotensis (Peters, 1863)

= Pristimantis bogotensis =

Species of frog

Pristimantis bogotensis, also known as the Bogota robber frog, is a species of frog in the family Strabomantidae. It is endemic to Colombia where it is only known from the Cundinamarca Department including the Bogotá area, on the Cordillera Oriental. Its natural habitats are tropical moist montane forests and high-altitude páramo grassland, but it adapts to disturbance and can also occur on pastureland, provided that some shrubs remain.
