= Pristimantis bipunctatus =

Conservation status
- Least Concern (IUCN 3.1)

Scientific classification
- Kingdom: Animalia
- Phylum: Chordata
- Class: Amphibia
- Order: Anura
- Clade: Brachycephaloidea
- Family: Craugastoridae
- Genus: Pristimantis
- Species: P. bipunctatus

Binomial name
- Pristimantis bipunctatus (Duellman & Hedges, 2005)

Synonyms
- Eleutherodactylus bipunctatus Duellman & Hedges, 2005

Species of amphibian

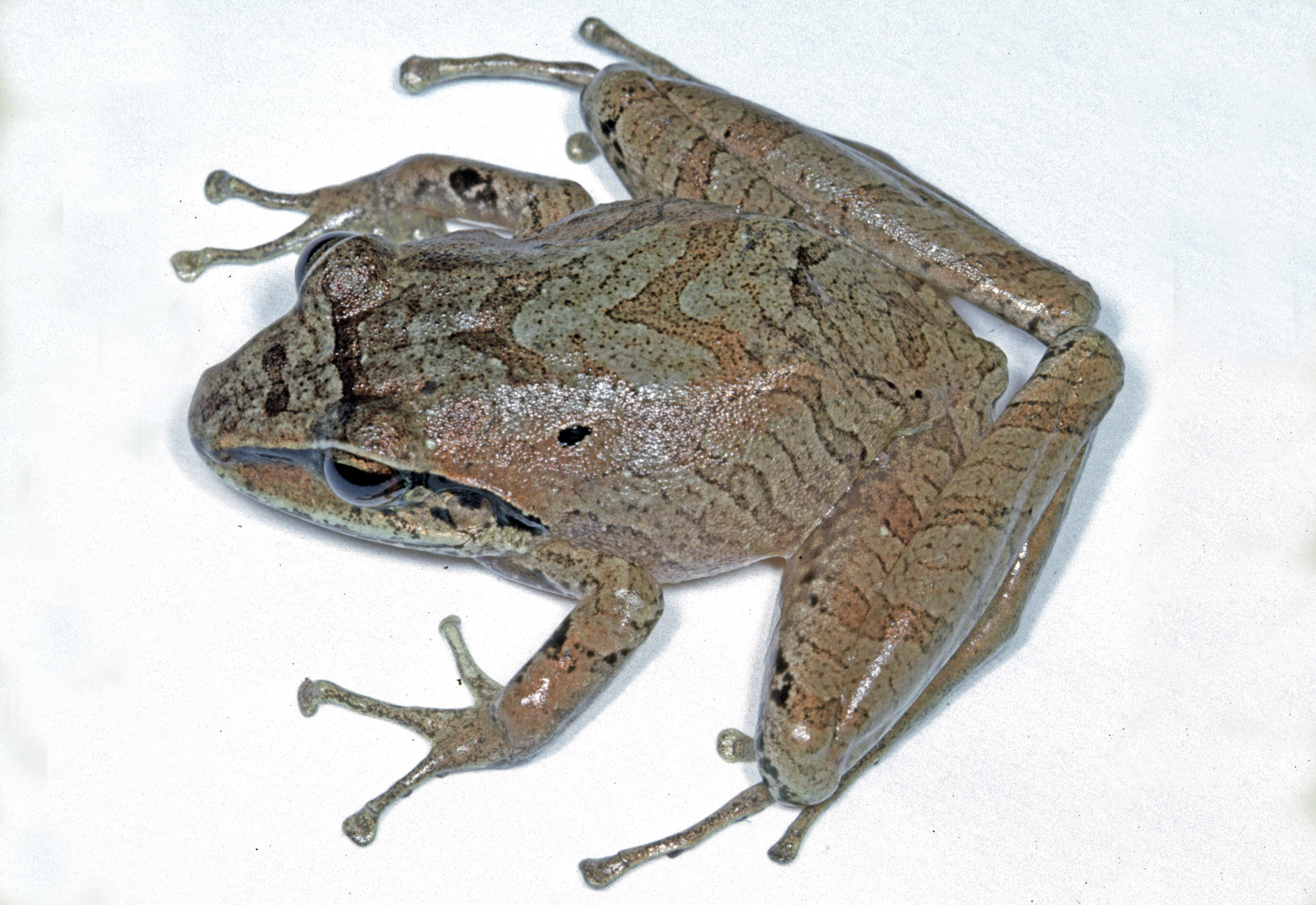
A photograph of pristimantis bipunctatus, showing its distinctive colouring.

Pristimantis bipunctatus is a species of frog in the family Strabomantidae.

It is endemic to Peru. Its natural habitat is tropical moist montane forests.
