= Pristimantis reticulatus =

Conservation status
- Data Deficient (IUCN 3.1)

Scientific classification
- Kingdom: Animalia
- Phylum: Chordata
- Class: Amphibia
- Order: Anura
- Family: Strabomantidae
- Genus: Pristimantis
- Species: P. reticulatus

Binomial name
- Pristimantis reticulatus (Walker & Test, 1955)

Synonyms
- Eleutherodactylus reticulatus Walker & Test, 1955

Species of frog

Pristimantis reticulatus is a species of frog in the family Strabomantidae. It is endemic to Venezuela. Its natural habitat is tropical moist montane forests.
