= Pristimantis thectopternus =

Conservation status
- Least Concern (IUCN 3.1)

Scientific classification
- Kingdom: Animalia
- Phylum: Chordata
- Class: Amphibia
- Order: Anura
- Clade: Brachycephaloidea
- Family: Craugastoridae
- Genus: Pristimantis
- Species: P. thectopternus

Binomial name
- Pristimantis thectopternus (Lynch, 1965)

Synonyms
- Eleutherodactylus thectopternus Lynch, 1965

Species of amphibian

Pristimantis thectopternus, commonly called the Northern Cordilleras robber frog, is a species of frog in the family Strabomantidae. It is endemic to Colombia. Its natural habitats are tropical moist montane forests, plantations, rural gardens, and heavily degraded former forest.
