= Pristimantis aaptus =

Conservation status
- Least Concern (IUCN 3.1)

Scientific classification
- Kingdom: Animalia
- Phylum: Chordata
- Class: Amphibia
- Order: Anura
- Clade: Brachycephaloidea
- Family: Craugastoridae
- Genus: Pristimantis
- Species: P. aaptus

Binomial name
- Pristimantis aaptus (Lynch & Lescure, 1980)

Synonyms
- Eleutherodactylus aaptus Lynch & Lescure, 1980

Species of amphibian

Pristimantis aaptus is a species of frog in the family Strabomantidae. It is endemic to the Amazon basin in Peru (Loreto Region) and Colombia (Amazonas Department). This species is rated "Least Concern" by the IUCN: although it is an uncommon species, there are large areas of suitable habitat, and threats to it are at local scales only.

== Habitat ==
This frog is found in tropical rainforest, often near streams, at elevation of up to 200 m.
