= Pristimantis colodactylus =

Conservation status
- Least Concern (IUCN 3.1)

Scientific classification
- Kingdom: Animalia
- Phylum: Chordata
- Class: Amphibia
- Order: Anura
- Clade: Brachycephaloidea
- Family: Craugastoridae
- Genus: Pristimantis
- Species: P. colodactylus

Binomial name
- Pristimantis colodactylus (Lynch, 1979)

Synonyms
- Eleutherodactylus colodactylus Lynch, 1979

Species of frog

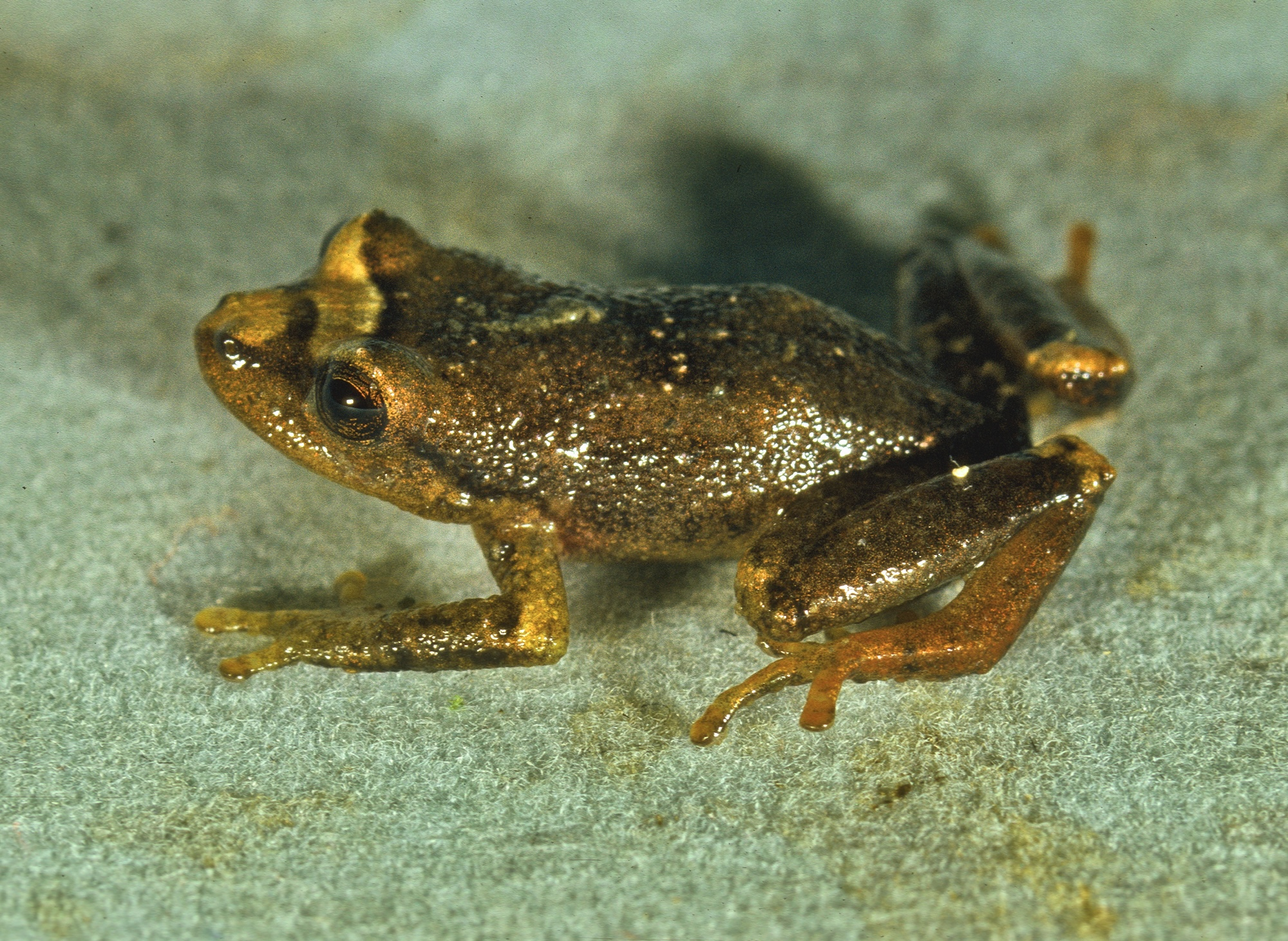
A close-up view of P. colodactylus

Pristimantis colodactylus is a species of frog in the family Strabomantidae. It is found in Ecuador and Peru. Its natural habitat is tropical moist montane forests. It is threatened by habitat loss.
