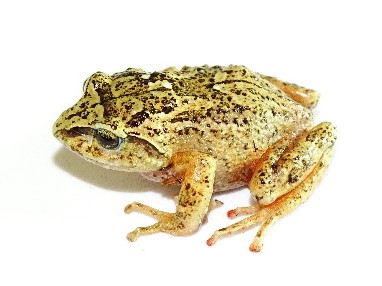

Conservation status
- Least Concern (IUCN 3.1)

Scientific classification
- Kingdom: Animalia
- Phylum: Chordata
- Class: Amphibia
- Order: Anura
- Clade: Brachycephaloidea
- Family: Craugastoridae
- Genus: Pristimantis
- Species: P. nervicus

Binomial name
- Pristimantis nervicus (Lynch, 1994)

Synonyms
- Eleutherodactylus nervicus Lynch, 1994

= Pristimantis nervicus =

Species of frog

Pristimantis nervicus is a species of frog in the family Strabomantidae. It is endemic to Colombia. Its natural habitats are tropical moist montane forests, high-altitude shrubland, and high-altitude grassland. It is threatened by habitat loss.
