= Pristimantis librarius =

Conservation status
- Data Deficient (IUCN 3.1)

Scientific classification
- Kingdom: Animalia
- Phylum: Chordata
- Class: Amphibia
- Order: Anura
- Family: Strabomantidae
- Genus: Pristimantis
- Species: P. librarius

Binomial name
- Pristimantis librarius (Flores and Vigle, 1994)

Synonyms
- Eleutherodactylus librarius Flores and Vigle, 1994

Species of frog

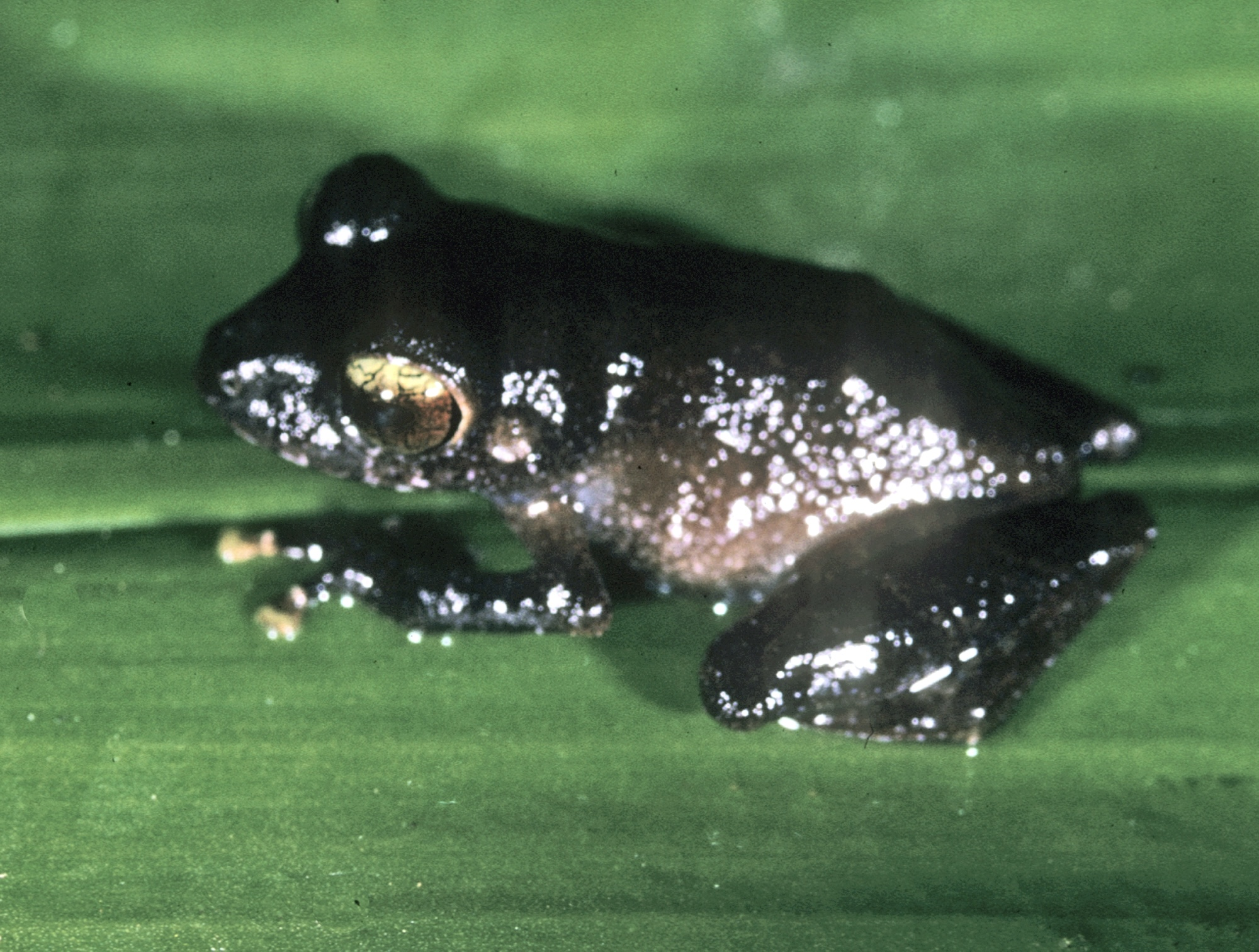
Pristimantis librarius on a leaf

Pristimantis librarius is a species of frog in the family Strabomantidae. It is endemic to Ecuador. Its natural habitat is tropical moist lowland forests. It is threatened by habitat loss.
