= Pristimantis lirellus =

Conservation status
- Least Concern (IUCN 3.1)

Scientific classification
- Kingdom: Animalia
- Phylum: Chordata
- Class: Amphibia
- Order: Anura
- Family: Strabomantidae
- Genus: Pristimantis
- Species: P. lirellus

Binomial name
- Pristimantis lirellus (Dwyer, 1995)

Synonyms
- Eleutherodactylus lirellus Dwyer, 1995

Species of frog

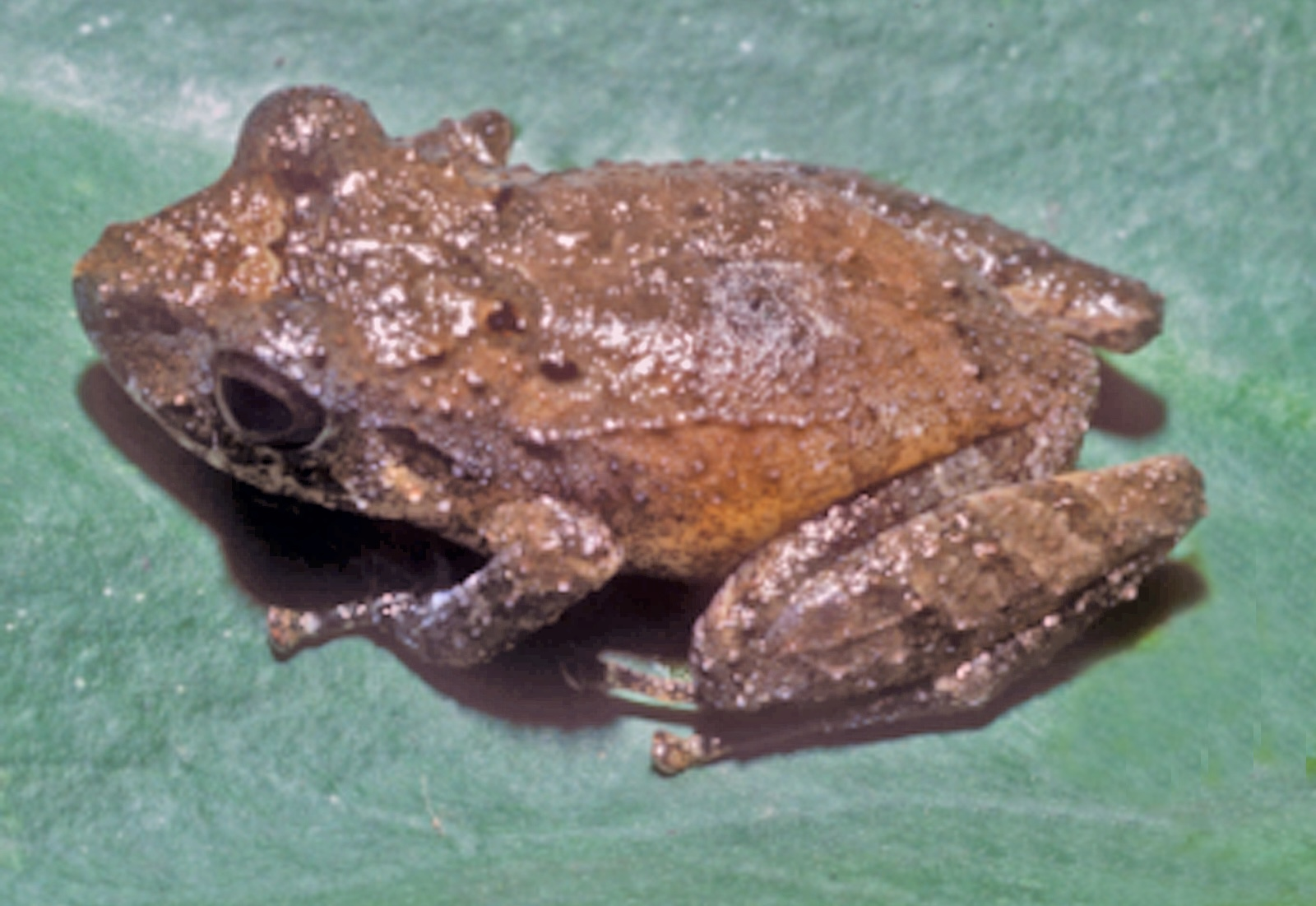

Pristimantis lirellus is a species of frog in the family Strabomantidae. It is endemic to Peru. Its natural habitat is tropical moist lowland forests. It is threatened by habitat loss.
