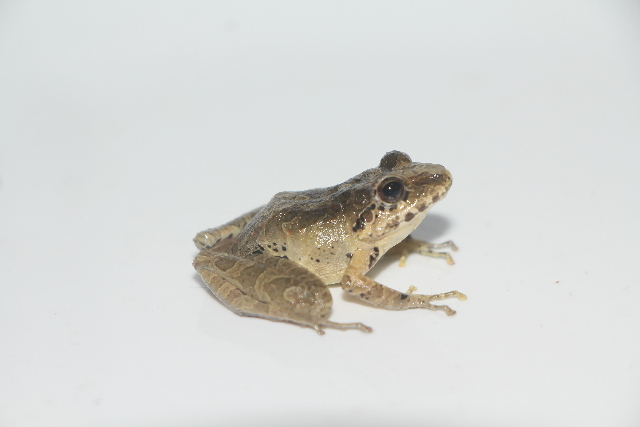

Conservation status
- Least Concern (IUCN 3.1)

Scientific classification
- Kingdom: Animalia
- Phylum: Chordata
- Class: Amphibia
- Order: Anura
- Family: Strabomantidae
- Genus: Pristimantis
- Species: P. w-nigrum

Binomial name
- Pristimantis w-nigrum (Boettger, 1892)

Synonyms
- Hylodes w-nigrum Boettger, 1892; Hylodes buergeri Werner, 1899; Eleutherodactylus w-nigrum (Boettger, 1892)

= Pristimantis w-nigrum =

Species of frog

Pristimantis w-nigrum, also known as the Zurucuchu robber frog or w rainfrog, is a species of frog in the family Strabomantidae. It is found on both Pacific and Amazonian slopes of the Andes in Colombia, Ecuador, and northern Peru. The species is divided to at least eight clades that are genetically highly divergent but morphologically similar; it may be a species complex.

== Description ==
Pristimantis w-nigrum males measure 29–47 mm (1.1–1.9 in) in snout–vent length and females measure 44–57 mm (1.7–2.2 in). Live specimens are easily recognized by a colour pattern of yellow with black markings on the groin, anterior and posterior surfaces of thighs, and concealed shank. Tympanum is distinct.

== Habitat ==
The natural habitats of Pristimantis w-nigrum are cloud forest and sub-páramo, but it occurs also in deforested and disturbed areas. It is a nocturnal species that can be found perched on vegetation up to 3 metres above ground; during the day it can be found on fallen leaves. It is a common species although it has declined in many areas.
