= Pristimantis lutitus =

Conservation status
- Endangered (IUCN 3.1)

Scientific classification
- Kingdom: Animalia
- Phylum: Chordata
- Class: Amphibia
- Order: Anura
- Clade: Brachycephaloidea
- Family: Craugastoridae
- Genus: Pristimantis
- Species: P. lutitus

Binomial name
- Pristimantis lutitus (Lynch, 1984)

Synonyms
- Eleutherodactylus lutitus Lynch, 1984

Species of amphibian

Pristimantis lutitus is a species of frog in the family Strabomantidae.

It is endemic to Colombia. Its natural habitat is tropical moist montane forests. It is threatened by habitat loss.
