= Pristimantis exoristus =

Conservation status
- Data Deficient (IUCN 3.1)

Scientific classification
- Kingdom: Animalia
- Phylum: Chordata
- Class: Amphibia
- Order: Anura
- Clade: Brachycephaloidea
- Family: Craugastoridae
- Genus: Pristimantis
- Species: P. exoristus

Binomial name
- Pristimantis exoristus (Duellman & Pramuk, 1999)

Synonyms
- Eleutherodactylus exoristus Duellman & Pramuk, 1999

Species of frog

Pristimantis exoristus is a species of frog in the family Strabomantidae. It is found in Ecuador and Peru. Its natural habitat is tropical moist montane forests. It is threatened by habitat loss.
