= List of endangered amphibians =

- Extinct in the wild (EW): 2 species
- Critically endangered (CR): 825 species
- Endangered (EN): 1,291 species
- Vulnerable (VU): 815 species
- Near threatened (NT): 453 species
- Least concern (LC): 3,733 species
- Data deficient (DD): 896 species
Amphibian species (IUCN, 2025-2)
- 8052 extant species have been evaluated
- 7156 of those are fully assessed (Note: excludes data deficient evaluations.)
- 4186 are not threatened at present (Note: NT and LC.)
- 2931 to 3827 are threatened (Note: Threatened comprises CR, EN and VU. Upper estimate additionally includes DD.)
- 35 to 148 are extinct or extinct in the wild:
  - 37 extinct (EX) species (Note: Chart omits extinct (EX) species)
  - 2 extinct in the wild (EW)

Endangered (EN) species are considered to be facing a very high risk of extinction in the wild.

As of December 2025, the International Union for Conservation of Nature (IUCN) lists 1291 endangered amphibian species. Of all evaluated amphibian species, 16% are listed as endangered.

For a species to be considered endangered by the IUCN it must meet certain quantitative criteria which are designed to classify taxa facing "a very high risk of extinction". An even higher risk is faced by critically endangered species, which meet the quantitative criteria for endangered species. Critically endangered amphibians are listed separately. There are 2116 amphibian species which are endangered or critically endangered.

Additionally 896 amphibian species (11.1% of those evaluated) are listed as data deficient, meaning there is insufficient information for a full assessment of conservation status. As these species typically have small distributions and/or populations, they are intrinsically likely to be threatened, according to the IUCN. While the category of data deficient indicates that no assessment of extinction risk has been made for the taxa, the IUCN notes that it may be appropriate to give them "the same degree of attention as threatened taxa, at least until their status can be assessed".

This is a complete list of endangered amphibian species evaluated by the IUCN, last substantially updated February 2022.

== Caudata ==
Salamanders

=== Hynobiidae ===
Asiatic salamanders

- Longdong stream salamander (Batrachuperus londongensis)
- Yenyuan stream salamander (Batrachuperus yenyuanensis)
- Abe's salamander (Hynobius abei)
- Abu salamander (Hynobius abuensis)
- Aki salamander (Hynobius akiensis)
- Amji's salamander (Hynobius amjiensis)
- Arisan hynobiid (Hynobius arisanensis)
- Yamaguchi salamander (Hynobius bakan)
- Odaigahara salamander (Hynobius boulengeri)
- Taiwan salamander (Hynobius formosanus)
- Geoje salamander (Hynobius geojeensis)
- Hakuba salamander (Hynobius hidamontanus)
- Iwami salamander (Hynobius iwami)
- Akaishi salamander (Hynobius katoi)
- Blotched salamander (Hynobius naevius)
- Oki salamander (Hynobius okiensis)
- Osumi salamander (Hynobius osumiensis)
- San'in salamander (Hynobius setoi)
- Sobo salamander (Hynobius shinichisatoi)
- Sonan's salamander (Hynobius sonani)
- Hokuriku salamander (Hynobius takedai)
- Tosashimizu-sanshouo (Hynobius tosashimizuensis)
- Tsurugi salamander (Hynobius tsurugiensis)
- Hynobius unisacculus
- Kori salamander (Hynobius yangi)
- Tadami clawed salamander (Onychodactylus fuscus)
- Paghman mountain salamander (Paradactylodon mustersi)
- Jinfo salamander (Pseudohynobius jinfo)
- Central Asian salamander (Ranodon sibiricus)

=== Salamandridae ===
True salamanders and newts

- Sardinian brook salamander (Euproctus platycephalus)
- Dayang newt (Hypselotriton orphicus)
- Laos warty newt (Laotriton laoensis)
- Anatolia Lycian salamander (Lyciasalamandra antalyana)
- Atif's Lycian salamander (Lyciasalamandra atifi)
- Bay Lycian salamander (Lyciasalamandra billae)
- Fazil Lycian salamander (Lyciasalamandra fazilae)
- Marmaris Lycian salamander (Lyciasalamandra flavimembris)
- Luschan's salamander (Lyciasalamandra luschani)
- Baran's newt (Neurergus barani)
- Chang's stout newt (Pachytriton changi)
- Mo's stout newt (Pachytriton moi)
- Pachytriton wuguanfui
- Yunwu warty newt (Paramesotriton yunwuensis)
- Zhijin warty newt (Paramesotriton zhijinensis)
- Edough ribbed newt (Pleurodeles poireti)
- Northern spectacled salamander (Salamandrina perspicillata)
- Dabie knobby newt (Tylototriton dabienicus)
- Hainan knobby newt (Tylototriton hainanensis)
- Tylototriton liuyangensis
- Southern Sichuan crocodile newt (Tylototriton pseudoverrucosus)
- Tiannan crocodile newt (Tylototriton yangi)

=== Ambystomatidae ===
Mole salamanders

- Mountain stream salamander (Ambystoma altamirani)
- Reticulated flatwoods salamander (Ambystoma bishopi)
- Frosted flatwoods salamander (Ambystoma cingulatum)
- Yellow-peppered salamander (Ambystoma flavipiperatum)
- Granular salamander (Ambystoma granulosum)
- Lake Lerma salamander (Ambystoma lermaense)
- Puerto Hondo stream salamander (Ambystoma ordinarium)
- Michoacan stream salamander (Ambystoma rivulare)

=== Plethodontidae ===
Lungless salamanders

- Shasta salamander (Aneides iecanus)
- Santa Cruz black salamander (Aneides niger)
- San Simeon slender salamander (Batrachoseps incognitus)
- Lesser slender salamander (Batrachospes minor)
- Kings River slender salamander (Batrachoseps regius)
- Kern Plateau salamander (Batrachoseps robustus)
- Kern Canyon slender salamander (Batrachoseps simatus)
- Tehachapi slender salamander (Batrachoseps stebbinsi)
- Coal black salamander (Bolitoglossa anthracina)
- Awajun salamander (Bolitoglossa awajun)
- Cerro Pando salamander (Bolitoglossa compacta)
- Bolitoglossa copinhorum
- Oak forest salamander (Bolitoglossa cuchumatana)
- Camp Sasardi salamander (Bolitoglossa cuna)
- Bolitoglossa daryorum
- Bolitoglossa diaphora
- Dunn's climbing salamander (Bolitoglossa dunni)
- Engelhardt's climbing salamander (Bolitoglossa engelhardti)
- Bolitoglossa eremia
- Yellow-legged mushroomtongue salamander (Bolitoglossa flavimembris)
- Yellowbelly mushroomtongue salamander (Bolitoglossa flaviventris)
- Gomez's web-footed salamander (Bolitoglossa gomezi)
- Guaramacal's salamander (Bolitoglossa guaramacalensis)
- Holy-mountain salamander (Bolitoglossa heiroreias)
- Paramo Frontino salamander (Bolitoglossa hypacra)
- Rio Indio mushroomtongue salamander (Bolitoglossa indio)
- Bolitoglossa kaqchikelorum
- Bolitoglossa la
- Oaxacan mushroomtongue salamander (Bolitoglossa macrinii)
- Magnificent web-footed salamander (Bolitoglossa magnifica)
- Crater salamander (Bolitoglossa marmorea)
- Meliana climbing salamander (Bolitoglossa meliana)
- Dwarf climbing salamander (Bolitoglossa minutula)
- La Mucuy salamander (Bolitoglossa mucuyensis)
- Atoyac salamander (Bolitoglossa oaxacensis)
- Todos Santos salamander (Bolitoglossa omniumsanctorum)
- Mérida mountain salamander (Bolitoglossa orestes)
- Bolitoglossa pacaya
- Pandi mushroomtongue salamander (Bolitoglossa pandi)
- Pijol salamander (Bolitoglossa porrasorum)
- Rilett's climbing salamander (Bolitoglossa riletti)
- Cordillera Talamanca salamander (Bolitoglossa sooyorum)
- Tamá salamander (Bolitoglossa tamaense)
- Bolitoglossa tatamae
- Cerro Cituro salamander (Bolitoglossa taylori)
- Guatemalan black salamander (Bolitoglossa tenebrosa)
- Veracruz salamander (Bolitoglossa veracrucis)
- Bolitoglossa xibalba
- Yariguíes salamander (Bolitoglossa yariguiensis)
- Zapotec salamander (Bolitoglossa zapoteca)
- Finca Chiblac salamander (Bradytriton sinus)
- Gristle-headed splayfoot salamander (Chiropterotriton chondrostega)
- Bigfoot splayfoot salamander (Chiropterotriton magnipes)
- Xicotepec salamander (Chiropterotriton melipona)
- Miquihuana splayfoot salamander (Chiropterotriton miquihuanus)
- Toothy splayfoot salamander (Chiropterotriton multidentatus)
- Alvarez del Toro's hidden salamander (Cryptotriton alvarezdeltoroi)
- Cortez' hidden salamander (Cryptotriton nasalis)
- Flat-headed salamander (Desmognathus planiceps)
- Chisholm Trail salamander (Eurycea chisholmensis)
- Texas salamander (Eurycea neotenes)
- Blanco River Springs salamander (Eurycea pterophila)
- Barton Springs salamander (Eurycea sosorum)
- Jollyville Plateau salamander (Eurycea tonkawae)
- Georgia blind salamander (Eurycea wallacei)
- Berry Cave salamander (Gyrinophilus gulolineatus)
- Oaxacan false brook salamander (Isthmura boneti)
- Giant false brook salamander (Isthmura gigantea)
- Southern giant salamander (Isthmura maxima)
- Jumping salamander (Ixalotriton niger)
- Yoro salamander (Nototriton barbouri)
- Nototriton brodiei
- Nototriton lignicola
- Santa Barbara moss salamander (Nototriton limnospectator)
- Nototriton major
- Los diamantes worm salamander (Oedipina carablanca)
- Fortuna worm salamander (Oedipina fortunensis)
- Oedipina gracilis
- Cerro Pando worm salamander (Oedipina grandis)
- Chimaltenango worm salamander (Oedipina ignea)
- Muralla worm salamander (Oedipina kasios)
- Narrow-footed worm salamander (Oedipina leptopoda)
- Motagua worm salamander (Oedipina motaguae)
- Nicaraguan worm lizard (Oedipina nica)
- Quarry worm salamander (Oedipina poelzi)
- Oedpina salvadorensis
- Oedipina stenopodia
- Taylor's worm salamander (Oedipina taylori)
- Tzutujil worm salamander (Oedipina tzutujilorum)
- Red Hills salamander (Phaeognathus hubrichti)
- Blue Ridge gray-cheeked salamander (Plethodon amplus)
- Scott Bar salamander (Plethodon asupak)
- South Mountain gray-cheeked salamander (Plethodon meridianus)
- Jemez Mountains salamander (Plethodon neomexicanus)
- Siskiyou Mountains salamander (Plethodon stormi)
- Morelos false brook salamander (Pseudoeurycea altamontana)
- Sierra de Malinaltepec salamander (Pseudoeurycea amuzga)
- Pseudoeurycea conanti
- Firschein's false brook salamander (Pseudoeurycea firscheini)
- Sierra Juarez false brook salamander (Pseudoeurycea juarezi)
- Veracruz worm salamander (Pseudoeurycea lineola)
- Longtail false brook salamander (Pseudoeurycea longicauda)
- Veracruz green salamander (Pseudoeurycea lynchi)
- Black false brook salamander (Pseudoeurycea melanomolga)
- Mustache false brook salamander (Pseudoeurycea mystax)
- Black-spotted false brook salamander (Pseudoeurycea nigromaculata)
- Sierra de Juárez worm salamander (Pseudoeurycea orchileucos)
- San Martin worm salamander (Pseudoeurycea orchimelas)
- Muscular salamander (Pseudoeurycea papenfussi)
- Orange-tailed agile salamander (Pseudoeurycea ruficauda)
- Black-footed salamander (Pseudoeurycea tlilicxitl)
- Werler's salamander (Pseudoeurycea werleri)
- Mount Albo's cave salamander (Speleomantes flavus)
- Italian cave salamander (Speleomantes italicus)
- French cave salamander (Speleomantes strinatii)
- Supramonte cave salamander (Speleomantes supramontis)
- Boreal thorius (Thorius boreas)
- MacDougall's pygmy salamander (Thorius macdougalli)
- Zoquitlan pygmy salamander (Thorius maxillabrochus)
- Thorius minydemus
- Cerro San Felipe pigmy salamander (Thorius narisovalis)
- Omiltemi minute salamander (Thorius omiltemi)
- Veracruz pygmy salamander (Thorius pennatulus)
- Pine-dwelling minute salamander (Thorius pinicola)
- Heroic minute salamander (Thorius tlaxiacus)
- Taylor's pigmy salamander (Thorius troglodytes)

== Anura ==
Frogs

=== Bombinatoridae ===
Flat-headed frogs, fire-bellied toads

- Bornean flat-headed frog (Barbourula kalimantanensis)

=== Alytidae ===
Midwife toads, painted frogs

- Betic midwife toad (Alytes dickhilleni)
- Moroccan midwife toad (Alytes maurus)
- Mallorcan midwife toad (Alytes muletensis)

=== Pipidae ===
Clawed frogs, Surinam toads

- Myers' Suriname toad (Pipa myersi)
- Cape platanna (Xenopus gilli)
- Itombwe Massif clawed frog (Xenopus itombwensis)
- Largen's clawed frog (Xenopus largeni)

=== Pelobatidae ===
European spadefoot toads

- Varaldi's spadefoot toad (Pelobates varaldii)

=== Megophryidae ===
Litter frogs

- Appleby's leaf-litter toad (Leptobrachella applebyi)
- Kon Ka Kinh litter toad (Leptobrachella ardens)
- Firth's litter toad (Leptobrachella firthi)
- Ka Lon litter toad (Leptobrachella kalonensis)
- Big-eyed litter frog (Leptobrachella macrops)
- Sptted litter toad (Leptobrachella maculosa)
- Leptobrachella marmorata
- Musical leaf-litter toad (Leptobrachella melica)
- Nam Dong litter toad (Leptobrachella namdongensis)
- Leptobrachella pallida
- Rainy litter toad (Leptobrachella pluvialis)
- Pu Hoat litter toad (Leptobrachella puhoatensis)
- Orange-eyed litter frog (Leptobrachella pyrrhops)
- Leptobrachella sabahmontana
- Ta Dung litter toad (Leptobrachella tadungensis)
- Tengchong leaf litter toad (Leptobrachella tengchongensis)
- Taosze spiny toad (Leptobrachium boringii)
- Buchard's spadefoot toad (Leptobrachium buchardi)
- Leishan spiny toad (Leptobrachium leishanense)
- Leptobrachium ngoclinhense
- Primary moustache toad (Leptobrachium promustache)
- Tenasserim spadefoot toad (Leptobrachium tenasserimense)
- Leptobrachium tengchongense
- Leptobrachium xanthops
- Yellow-spotted spadefoot toad (Leptobrachium xanthospilum)
- Short-legged horned toad (Megophrys brachykolos)
- Convex-tailed horned toad (Megophrys caudoprocta)
- Mount Fansipan horned frog (Megophrys fansipanensis)
- Yellow-spotted white-lipped horned toad (Megophrys flavipunctata)
- Gert's mountain toad (Megophrys gerti)
- Megophrys lini
- Himalayan horned frog (Megophrys himalayana)
- Hoang Lien horned frog (Megophrys hoanglienensis)
- Medog horned toad (Megophrys medogensis)
- Big-headed horned frog (Megophrys megacephala)
- Tamenglong horned frog (Megophrys numhbumaeng)
- Shyllong horned toad (Megophrys oropedion)
- Giant Himalayan horned frog (Megophrys periosa)
- Red-thighed horned frog (Megophrys rubrimera)
- Tak horned toad (Megophrys takensis)
- Tianzishan horned toad (Megophrys tuberogranulata)
- Megophrys vegrandis
- Zunheboto's horned toad (Megophrys zunhebotoensis)
- Oreolalax chuanbeiensis
- Oreolalax multipunctatus
- Omei lazy toad (Oreolalax omeimontis)
- Oreolalax pingii
- Oreolalax puxiongensis
- Sterling's toothed toad (Oreolalax sterlingae)
- Scutiger jiulongensis
- Scutiger liupanensis
- Scutiger muliensis
- Scutiger pingwuensis

=== Heleophrynidae ===
Ghost frogs

- Hewitt's ghost frog (Heleophryne hewitti)
- Table Mountain ghost frog (Heleophryne rosei)

=== Sooglossidae ===
Seychelles frogs

- Gardiner's Seychelles frog (Sechellophryne gardineri)
- Seychelles frog (Sooglossus sechellensis)

=== Calyptocephalellidae ===
Chilean toads

- Bullock's Mountains false toad (Telmatobufo bullocki)
- Telmatobufo ignotus
- Chile mountain false toad (Telmatobufo venustus)

=== Myobatrachidae ===
Australian toadlets, crowned toadlets, and allies

- Southern Flinders Ranges froglet (Crinia riparia)
- Sloane's froglet (Crinia sloanei)
- Fleay's barred frog (Mixophyes fleayi)
- Magnificent brood frog (Pseudophryne covacevichae)
- Sunset frog (Spicospina flammocaerulea)
- Eungella torrent frog (Taudactylus eungellensis)
- Howard River toadlet (Uperoleia daviesae)
- Mahony's toadlet (Uperoleia mahonyi)

=== Limnodynastidae ===
Australian ground frogs

- Eastern owl frog (Heleioporus australiacus)
- Mountain frog (Philoria kundagungan)
- Loveridge's frog (Philoria loveridgei)
- Pugh's frog (Philoria pughi)
- Richmond frog (Philoria richmondensis)

=== Brachycephalidae ===
Saddleback toads and allies

- Brachycephalus actaeus
- Brachycephalus albolineatus
- Brachycephalus alipioi
- Brachycephalus curupira
- Brachycephalus darkside
- Brachycephalus garbeanus
- Brachycephalus margaritatus
- Brachycephalus olivaceus
- Flea toad (Brachycephalus pulex)
- Brachycephalus tridactylus
- Brachycephalus vertebralis
- Organ Mountains robber frog (Ischnocnema gualteri)
- Ischnocnema manezinho

=== Eleutherodactylidae ===
Robber frogs

- Cuban dwarf grassfrog (Eleutherodactylus adelus)
- Dominica frog (Eleutherodactylus amplinympha)
- Jamaican rump-spotted frog (Eleutherodactylus andrewsi)
- Baoruco hammer frog (Eleutherodactylus armstrongi)
- Gaudeloupe streamfrog (Eleutherodactylus barlagnei)
- Trinidad flat-headed frog (Eleutherodactylus casparii)
- Cobre fernfrog (Eleutherodactylus cattus)
- Cave coqui (Eleutherodactylus cooki)
- Yellow cave frog (Eleutherodactylus counouspeus)
- Turquino red-armed frog (Eleutherodactylus cubanus)
- Trinidad groin-spotted frog (Eleutherodactylus emiliae)
- Erendira's trilling frog (Eleutherodactylus erendirae)
- Camarones red-legged frog (Eleutherodactylus erythroproctus)
- Jamaican ear-spotted frog (Eleutherodactylus fuscus)
- Eleutherodactylus geitonos
- Turquino fern frog (Eleutherodactylus glamyrus)
- Ball bearing frog (Eleutherodactylus glaphycompus)
- Blue mountain rock frog (Eleutherodactylus glaucoreius)
- Jamaican pallid frog (Eleutherodactylus grabhami)
- Yellow chevronate frog (Eleutherodactylus grahami)
- Great peeping frog (Eleutherodactylus grandis)
- Cockpit frog (Eleutherodactylus griphus)
- Grünwald's piping frog (Eleutherodactylus grunwaldi)
- Montane cricket frog (Eleutherodactylus haitianus)
- Hedrick's coqui (Eleutherodactylus hedricki)
- Baoruco burrowing frog (Eleutherodactylus hypostenor)
- Oriente dark-bellied frog (Eleutherodactylus intermedius)
- Jalisco trilling frog (Eleutherodactylus jaliscoensis)
- Barred rockfrog (Eleutherodactylus klinikowskii)
- Yellow mottled coqui (Eleutherodactylus lentus)
- Southern pastel frog (Eleutherodactylus leoncei)
- Locust coqui (Eleutherodactylus locustus)
- Jamaican masked frog (Eleutherodactylus luteolus)
- Sierra Maestra long-legged frog (Eleutherodactylus maestrensis)
- Dark-faced bromeliad frog (Eleutherodactylus melacara)
- Cordillera central telegraph frog (Eleutherodactylus melatrigonum)
- Hispaniolan wheeping frog (Eleutherodactylus minutus)
- Hispaniolan montane frog (Eleutherodactylus montanus)
- Neiba leaf-litter frog (Eleutherodactylus neiba)
- Nieto's trilling frog (Eleutherodactylus nietoi)
- Neiba telegraph frog (Eleutherodactylus notidodes)
- Jamaican red-eyed frog (Eleutherodactylus nubicola)
- Neiba whistling frog (Eleutherodactylus parabates)
- Hispaniola cordillera frog (Eleutherodactylus patriciae)
- John Crow yellow-bellied frog (Eleutherodactylus pentasyringos)
- Eastern Cuba rockfrog (Eleutherodactylus pezopetrus)
- Gaudeloupe forest frog (Eleutherodactylus pinchoni)
- Hispaniolan melodius frog (Eleutherodactylus pituinus)
- Mountain coqui (Eleutherodactylus portoricensis)
- Oriente greenish-yellow frog (Eleutherodactylus principalis)
- Boca de Yuma frog (Eleutherodactylus probolaeus)
- Richmond's coqui (Eleutherodactylus richmondi)
- Baoruco red-legged frog (Eleutherodactylus rufifemoralis)
- Eastern burrowing frog (Eleutherodactylus ruthae)
- Virgin Islands coqui (Eleutherodactylus schwartzi)
- Massif du Nord whistling frog (Eleutherodactylus sommeri)
- Isla de la Juventud frog (Eleutherodactylus staurometopon)
- Cuban stripeless leaf-litter frog (Eleutherodactylus tetajulia)
- Oriente pallid frog (Eleutherodactylus toa)
- Vallejuelo burrowing frog (Eleutherodactylus tychathrous)
- Melodius coqui (Eleutherodactylus wightmanae)
- Sierra Huichol peeping frog (Eleutherodactylus wixarika)
- Cuban giant frog (Eleutherodactylus zeus)
- Rosario red-legged frog (Eleutherodactylus zugi)

=== Craugastoridae ===
Fleshbelly frogs

- Craugastor aphanus
- Azuero robber frog (Craugastor azueroensis)
- Blair's dirt frog (Craugastor blairi)
- Craugastor bocourti
- Craugastor cyanochthebius
- Dary's frog (Craugastor daryi)
- Craugastor emleni
- White-snouted robber frog (Craugastor galacticorhinus)
- Craugastor glaucus
- Gregg's stream frog (Craugastor greggi)
- Guerreran robber frog (Craugastor guerreroensis)
- Craugastor gutschei
- Craugastor laevissimus
- Craugastor matudai
- Craugastor megalotympanum
- Dunn's robber frog (Craugastor monnichorum)
- Craugastor montanus
- Craugastor pechorum
- Sabana robber frog (Craugastor rayo)
- Sagui dirt frog (Craugastor sagui)
- Craugastor saltator
- Sanderson's streamfrog (Craugastor sandersoni)
- Craugastor spatulatus
- Golfito robber frog (Craugastor taurus)
- Volcan San Martin rainfrog (Craugastor vulcani)
- Walker's Sierra frog (Geobatrachus walkeri)

=== Strabomantidae ===
Cloud forest groundfrogs

- Cuzco Andes frog (Bryophryne cophites)
- Canchaque Andes frog (Lynchius nebulanastes)
- Parker's Andes frog (Lynchius parkeri)
- Simmons' big-headed frog (Lynchius simmonsi)
- Microkayla adenopleura
- Microkayla chacaltaya
- Microkayla illimani
- Microkayla kempffi
- Microkayla quimsacruzis
- Niceforonia adenobrachia
- Niceforonia araiodactyla
- Carchi Andes frog (Niceforonia brunnea)
- Cannatella's Andes frog (Niceforonia lucida)
- Peracca's Andes frog (Niceforonia peraccai)
- Oreobates ayacucho
- Oreobates lehri
- Oreobates lundbergi
- Ayacucho Andes frog (Oreobates pereger)
- Oreobates remotus
- Phrynopus barthlenae
- Phrynopus daemon
- Phrynopus dagmarae
- Phrynopus horstpauli
- Inti Andes frog (Phrynopus inti)
- Phrynopus kauneorum
- Cascas Andes frog (Phrynopus montium)
- Phrynopus vestigiatus
- Ecuador leaf frog (Phyllonastes lochites)
- Lynch's leaf frog (Phyllonastes lynchi)
- Naturetrek leaf frog (Phyllonastes naturetrekii)
- Phyllonastes personinus
- Papallacta robber frog (Pristimantis acerus)
- Pristimantis actinolaimus
- Sharpsnout robber frog (Pristimantis acutirostris)
- Pristimantis aemulatus
- Cundinamarca robber frog (Pristimantis affinis)
- Quindio robber frog (Pristimantis alalocophus)
- Albuja's rainfrog (Pristimantis albujai)
- Pristimantis angustilineatus
- La Planada robber frog (Pristimantis apiculatus)
- Río Cerranayacu rain frog (Pristimantis ardalonychus)
- Pristimantis aurantiguttatus
- Pristimantis aureoventris
- Wine robber frog (Pristimantis bacchus)
- Speckled rain frog (Pristimantis balionotus)
- Bamboo rain-peeper (Pristimantis bambu)
- Morona robber frog (Pristimantis baryecuus)
- Pristimantis batrachites
- Pristimantis bellae
- Murri robber frog (Pristimantis bellona)
- Hill dweller rubber frog (Pristimantis bounides)
- Pristimantis briceni
- Buenaventura rainfrog (Pristimantis buenaventura)
- Pristimantis capitonis
- Los Cedros rainfrog (Pristimantis cedros)
- Ceron's green robber frog (Pristimantis carlosceroni)
- Pristimantis carlossanchezi
- Pristimantis carranguerorum
- Chomsky's rain frog (Pristimantis chomskyi)
- Throated robber frog (Pristimantis citriogaster)
- Pristimantis colostichos
- Pristimantis cordovae
- Pristimantis corniger
- Pristimantis cremnobates
- La Culata's paramo frog (Pristimantis culatensis)
- Orange robber frog (Pristimantis degener)
- DeVille's robber frog (Pristimantis devillei)
- Bright-colored cutin (Pristimantis dissimulatus)
- Pristimantis dorado
- Ecuadorian rainfrog (Pristimantis ecuadorensis)
- Eugenia's rainfrog (Pristimantis eugeniae)
- Shy robber frog (Pristimantis festae)
- Pristimantis gagliardoi
- Paria twin landfrog (Pristimantis geminus)
- Pristimantis gentryi
- Ecuador robber frog (Pristimantis glandulosus)
- Gloria's rain frog (Pristimantis gloria)
- Giant robber frog (Pristimantis grandiceps)
- Pristimantis gualacenio
- Pristimantis hampatusami
- Pristimantis helvolus
- Hernandez's robber frog (Pristimantis hernandezi)
- Pristimantis huicundo
- Agua Bonita robber frog (Pristimantis hybotragus)
- Fire robber frog (Pristimantis ignicolor)
- Rio Azuela robber frog (Pristimantis incanus)
- Barking robber frog (Pristimantis inusitatus)
- Pristimantis jorgevelosai
- Kuri robber frog (Pristimantis kuri)
- Pristimantis lasalleorum
- Orange robber frog of Tinguichaca (Pristimantis latericius)
- Pristimantis leucopus
- Bruised robber frog (Pristimantis lividus)
- Maldonado robber frog (Pristimantis loustes)
- Rio Luisito robber frog (Pristimantis lutitus)
- Marco Reyes's robber frog (Pristimantis marcoreyesi)
- Pristimantis mazar
- Pristimantis metabates
- Mindo rainfrog (Pristimantis mindo)
- Pristimantis minimus
- Pristimantis mnionaetes
- Mura Nunka rainfrog (Pristimantis muranunka)
- Mutable rainfrog (Pristimantis mutabilis)
- Pristimantis myops
- Nieto's rainfrog (Pristimantis nietoi)
- Pristimantis nimbus
- Paria cloud forest landfrog (Pristimantis nubisilva)
- Pristimantis ocellatus
- Carchi robber frog (Pristimantis ocreatus)
- Urdaneta robber frog (Pristimantis orestes)
- Ornate rainfrog (Pristimantis ornatissimus)
- Pristimantis ornatus
- Pristimantis ortizi
- El Pahuma rainfrog (Pristimantis pahuma)
- Pristimantis paramerus
- Pristimantis pardalinus
- Pristimantis parectatus
- Paria dwarf landfrog (Pristimantis pariagnomus)
- Pastaza Valley robber frog (Pristimantis pastazensis)
- Zamora robber frog (Pristimantis percultus)
- Huambos robber frog (Pristimantis petrobardus)
- Pristimantis phalarus
- Pichincha robber frog (Pristimantis pichincha)
- Pristimantis pinguis
- Pristimantis ptochus
- Sleeping beauty rain frog (Pristimantis pulchridormientes)
- Thickskin robber frog (Pristimantis pycnodermis)
- Pristimantis quantus
- Pristimantis renjiforum
- Galeras robber frog (Pristimantis repens)
- Canchaque robber frog (Pristimantis rhodoplichus)
- Ron's robber frog (Pristimantis roni)
- Pristimantis rufoviridis
- Pristimantis satagius
- Los Patos robber frog (Pristimantis scoloblepharus)
- Pristimantis serendipitus
- Saint Vincent frog (Pristimantis shrevei)
- Pristimantis simoteriscus
- Pristimantis sirnigeli
- Spiny robber frog (Pristimantis spinosus)
- Cloud forest robber frog (Pristimantis surdus)
- Pristimantis susaguae
- Tiktik rain frog (Pristimantis tiktik)
- Torres' rain frog (Pristimantis torresi)
- Tototas rain frog (Pristimantis totoroi)
- Pristimantis tungurahua
- Pristimantis vanadise
- Mountain crest robber frog (Pristimantis vidua)
- Cerro Munchique robber frog (Pristimantis viridicans)
- Pristimantis viridis
- Pristimantis wagteri
- Yantzaza's rainfrog (Pristimantis yantzaza)
- Pristimantis yumbo
- Pristimantis zoilae
- Carmelita's robber frog (Serranobatrachus carmelitae)
- Cristina's robber frog (Serranobatrachus cristinae)
- Delicate robber frog (Serranobatrachus delicatus)
- Ruthven's robber frog (Serranobatrachus ruthveni)
- Rusty robber frog (Strabomantis bufoniformis)
- Rio Calles robber frog (Strabomantis cheiroplethus)
- Rio Suno robber frog (Strabomantis cornutus)
- Strabomantis ruizi
- Tachiramantis cuentasi
- Guacharaquita robber frog (Tachiramantis lentiginosus)
- Yunganastes ashkapara
- Yunganastes bisignatus

=== Hemiphractidae ===
Marsupial frogs, horned treefrogs, backpack frogs, and allies

- Cryptobatrachus pedroruizi
- Cryptobatrachus ruthveni
- Gold-spotted marsupial frog (Gastrotheca aureomaculata)
- Baritú’s marsupial frog (Gastrotheca chrysosticta)
- Gastrotheca cuencana
- Rio Calima marsupial frog (Gastrotheca dendronastes)
- North Shore marsupial frog (Gastrotheca espeletia)
- La Banderita marsupial frog (Gastrotheca gracilis)
- Helena's marsupial frog (Gastrotheca helenae)
- Gastrotheca nebulanastes
- Chilca marsupial frog (Gastrotheca ochoai)
- Gastrotheca oresbios
- Ayacucho marsupial frog (Gastrotheca pacchamama)
- Gastrotheca psychrophila
- Gastrotheca rebeccae
- Gastrotheca stictopleura
- Cerro Munchique marsupial frog (Gastrotheca trachyceps)
- Gastrotheca turnerorum
- Gastrotheca yacuri
- Johnson's horned treefrog (Hemiphractus johnsoni)
- Hemiphractus kaylockae
- Stefania roraimae

=== Hylidae ===
Tree frogs and allies

- Ceiba stream frog (Atlantihyla spinipollex)
- Boana buriti
- Boana ericae
- Boana freicanecae
- Boana palaestes
- Barro Branco tree frog (Boana secedens)
- Bokermannohyla juiju
- Bokermannohyla napolii
- Bokermannohyla sagarana
- Bokermannohyla vulcaniae
- Greater bromeliad tree frog (Bromeliohyla dendroscarta)
- Bromeliohyla melacaena
- Yellowbelly voiceless tree frog (Charadrahyla altipotens)
- Oaxacan cloud-forest tree frog (Charadrahyla nephila)
- Mixteca cloud-forest treefrog (Charadrahyla sakbah)
- Spine-fingered tree frog (Charadrahyla trux)
- Dendropsophus dutrai
- Dendropsophus gryllatus
- Merida treefrog (Dendropsophus meridensis)
- Dendropsophus rozenmani
- Dendropsophus studerae
- Dendropsophus yaracuyanus
- Yellow-bellied treefrog (Dryophytes flaviventris)
- Suweon tree frog (Dryophytes suweonensis)
- Chamula mountain brook frog (Duellmanohyla chamulae)
- Legler's stream frog (Duellmanohyla legleri)
- Savage's brook frog (Duellmanohyla lythrodes)
- Honduran brook frog (Duellmanohyla salvavida)
- Copan brook frog (Duellmanohyla soralia)
- Ecnomiohyla salvaje
- Chiapan Highlands treefrog (Exerodonta bivocata)
- Chimalpa treefrog (Exerodonta chimalapa)
- Perkins' treefrog (Exerodonta perkinsi)
- Cauca treefrog (Hyloscirtus caucanus)
- La Loma treefrog (Hyloscirtus colymba)
- Hyloscirtus condor
- Cryptic torrenteer (Hyloscirtus criptico)
- Perijá's stream frog (Hyloscirtus japreria)
- Mashpi torrenteer (Hyloscirtus mashpi)
- Morona-Santiago tree frog (Hyloscirtus pacha)
- Rio Luisito tree frog (Hyloscirtus piceigularis)
- Hyloscirtus ptychodactylus
- Western Andes treefrog (Hyloscirtus sarampiona)
- Jondachi tree frog (Hyloscirtus staufferorum)
- Tapichalaca tree frog (Hyloscirtus tapichalaca)
- Hyloscirtus tigrinus
- Isthmohyla infucata
- Isthmohyla rivularis
- Variegated tree frog (Megastomatohyla mixomaculata)
- Myersiohyla liliae
- Kanaima tree frog (Nesorohyla kanaima)
- Nyctimantis galeata
- Ololygon belloni
- Heyer's snouted tree frog (Ololygon heyeri)
- Ololygon insperata
- Coastal snouted treefrog (Ololygon littorea)
- Ololygon skuki
- Yellow bromeliad frog (Osteopilus marianae)
- Phyllodytes amadoi
- Phyllodytes gyrinaethes
- Phyllodytes punctatus
- Golden treefrog (Phytotriades auratus)
- Thorny spikethumb frog (Plectrohyla acanthodes)
- Greater spikethumb frog (Plectrohyla avia)
- Hartweg's spikethumb frog (Plectrohyla hartwegi)
- Plectrohyla insolita
- Pop-eyed spikethumb frog (Plectrohyla lacertosa)
- Rio Sananja spikethumb frog (Plectrohyla pokomchi)
- Plectrohyla psiloderma
- Plectrohyla quecchi
- Guerreran stream frog (Quilticohyla erythromma)
- Chinamococh stream frog (Quilticohyla sanctaecrucis)
- Zoque treefrog (Quilticohyla zoque)
- Mixteca Alta treefrog (Sarcohyla ameibothalame)
- Southern Sierra Madre treefrog (Sarcohyla cembra)
- Golden treefrog (Sarcohyla chryses)
- Mixe streamside treefrog (Sarcohyla labeculata)
- Keel-snouted treefrog (Sarcohyla mykter)
- Adler's mottled treefrog (Sarcohyla thorectes)
- Scinax cabralensis
- Caldas snouted treefrog (Scinax caldarum)
- Joly's snouted treefrog (Scinax jolyi)
- Upland burrowing tree frog (Smilisca dentata)
- Tepuihyla obscura
- Warren's treefrog (Tepuihyla warreni)

=== Phyllomedusidae ===
Leaf frogs

- Agalychnis medinae
- Purple-sided leaf frog (Callimedusa baltea)
- Orange-spotted leaf frog (Callimedusa perinesos)
- Phasmahyla lisbella

=== Pelodryadidae ===
Australian treefrogs

- Booroolong frog (Litoria booroolongensis)
- Littlejohn's tree frog (Litoria littlejohni)
- Litoria watsoni

=== Bufonidae ===
True toads

- Adenomus kandianus
- Malcolm's Ethiopian toad (Altiphrynoides malcolmi)
- Arroyo toad (Anaxyrus californicus)
- Golden Rock slender toad (Ansonia kyaiktiyoensis)
- Bornean rainbow toad (Ansonia latidisca)
- Ansonia phuketensis
- Pilok stream toad (Ansonia pilokensis)
- Siamese stream toad (Ansonia siamensis)
- Thin Thin's stream toad (Ansonia thinthinae)
- Ansonia teneritas
- Andes stubfoot toad (Atelopus andinus)
- Guajira stubfoot toad (Atelopus carrikeri)
- Coloma's harlequin toad (Atelopus colomai)
- Elegant stubfoot toad (Atelopus elegans)
- Atelopus exiguus
- Atelopus laetissimus
- El Tambo stubfoot toad (Atelopus longibrachius)
- Atelopus manauensis
- Atelopus mittermeieri
- Atelopus nahumae
- Atelopus oxapampae
- Upper Amazon stubfoot toad (Atelopus seminiferus)
- Pebas stubfoot toad (Atelopus spumarius)
- Amboli lateritic toad (Beduka amboli)
- Koyna toad (Beduka koynayensis)
- Bufo aspinius
- Moonlight mountain toadlet (Capensibufo selenophos)
- Dendrophryniscus lauroi
- Duttaphrynus kotagamai
- Cuchumatan golden toad (Incilius aurarius)
- Mountain toad (Incilius cavifrons)
- Incilius chompipe
- Large-crested toad (Incilius cristatus)
- Jeweled toad (Incilius gemmifer)
- Incilius guanacaste
- Michoacan toad (Incilius pisinnus)
- Spiculate toad (Incilius spiculatus)
- Incilius tacanensis
- Ingerophrynus gollum
- Ingerophrynus kumquat
- Leptophryne javanica
- Melanophryniscus biancae
- Torres redbelly toad (Melanophryniscus macrogranulosus)
- Melanophryniscus milanoi
- Melanophryniscus spectabilis
- Melanophryniscus vilavelhensis
- Mertensophryne howelli
- Abra Malaga toad (Nannophryne corynetes)
- Nectophrynoides cryptus
- Minute tree toad (Nectophrynoides minutus)
- Vestergaard's forest toad (Nectophrynoides vestergaardi)
- Roraima bush toad (Oreophrynella quelchii)
- Osornophryne angel
- Nano plump toad (Osornophryne antisana)
- Western Andean plump toad (Osornophryne occidentalis)
- Osornophryne puruanta
- Simpson's plump toad (Osornophryne simpsoni)
- Cuban pine toad (Peltophryne cataulaciceps)
- Central Cuban long-nosed toad (Peltophryne dunni)
- Zapata toad (Peltophryne florentinoi)
- Puerto Rican crested toad (Peltophryne lemur)
- Ohakandja toad (Poyntonophrynus hoeschi)
- Carchi Andes toad (Rhaebo colomai)
- Achala toad (Rhinella achalensis)
- Cerro Mali beaked toad (Rhinella acrolopha)
- Rhinella arborescandens
- Rio chili toad (Rhinella arequipensis)
- Rhinella casconi
- Rhinella chavin
- Rhinella cristinae
- Rhinella gallardoi
- Murri beaked toad (Rhinella lindae)
- Colombian beaked toad (Rhinella nicefori)
- Antioqua beaked toad (Rhinella tenrec)
- Rhinella vellardi
- Rhinella yanachaga
- Spotted Asian tree toad (Sabahphrynus maculatus)
- Western leopard toad (Sclerophrys pantherina)
- Tai toad (Sclerophrys taiensis)
- Truebella tothastes
- Amathole toad (Vandijkophrynus amatolicus)
- Inyanga toad (Vandijkophrynus inyangae)
- Buea smalltongue toad (Werneria preussi)
- Werneria submontana
- Mount Okou Wolterstorff toad (Wolterstorffina mirei)

=== Aromobatidae ===
Cryptic forest frogs

- Sapito niñera del Brasil (Allobates brunneus)
- Sapito niñera humilde (Allobates humilis)
- Nurse frog of the Serranía de Perijá (Allobates ignotus)
- Allobates juanii
- Sapito niñera oriental (Allobates mandelorum)
- Anomaloglossus blanci
- Beebe's rocket frog (Anomaloglossus beebei)
- Kaie rock frog (Anomaloglossus kaiei)
- Sapito niñera de Pradeiro (Anomaloglossus praderioi)
- Anomaloglossus roraima
- Aromobates ericksonae
- Mayorga rocket frog (Aromobates mayorgai)
- Ornate cloud frog (Aromobates ornatissimus)
- Salty rocket frog (Aromobates saltuensis)
- Churuguara collared frog (Mannophryne caquetio)
- Mannophryne collaris
- Socopo collared frog (Mannophryne lamarcai)
- Sierra de Aroa collared frog (Mannophryne molinai)
- Orellana's collared frog (Mannophryne orellana)
- Mannophryne riveroi
- Trujillo collared frog (Mannophryne trujillensis)
- Yacambú collared frog (Mannophryne yustizi)

=== Dendrobatidae ===
Poison dart frogs

- Boehmei's poison arrow frog (Ameerega boehmei)
- Cainarachi poison frog (Ameerega cainarachi)
- Ameerega rubriventris
- Ameerega shihuemoy
- Silverstone's poison frog (Ameerega silverstonei)
- Ameerega yoshina
- Andinobates claudiae
- Andinobates daleswansoni
- Andinobates victimatus
- Cauca rocket frog (Colostethus agilis)
- Silverstone's rocket frog (Colostethus imbricolus)
- Colostethus ucumari
- Confusing rocket frog (Ectopoglossus confusus)
- Ectopoglossus isthminus
- Darwin Wallace poison frog (Epipedobates darwinwallacei)
- Cóndor poison frog (Excidobates condor)
- Marañón poison frog (Excidobates mysteriosus)
- Montane rocket frog (Hyloxalus alessandroi)
- Sky-blue poison frog (Hyloxalus azureiventris)
- Palanda rocket frog (Hyloxalus cevallosi)
- Choco rocket frog (Hyloxalus chocoensis)
- Hyloxalus fuliginosus
- Spotted rocket frog (Hyloxalus maculosus)
- Cloud forest rocket frog (Hyloxalus mystax)
- Hyloxalus picachos
- Malvasa rocket frog (Hyloxalus pinguis)
- Ramos' rocket frog (Hyloxalus ramosi)
- Forest rocket frog (Hyloxalus sylvaticus)
- Leucostethus ramirezi
- Oophaga anchicayensis
- Oophaga andresi
- Vicente's poison frog (Oophaga vicentei)
- Tanti rocket frog (Paruwrobates whymperi)
- Black-legged poison dart frog (Phyllobates bicolor)
- Golden poison frog (Phyllobates terribilis)
- Summers' poison frog (Ranitomeya summersi)
- Silverstoneia dalyi
- Silverstoneia erasmios
- Silverstoneia punctiventris

=== Leptodactylidae ===
Southern frogs

- Kwet's nest-building frog (Adenomera kweti)
- Lutz's tropical bullfrog (Adenomera lutzi)
- Izecksohn's bromeliad frog (Crossodactylodes izecksohni)
- Colorado dwarf frog (Engystomops coloradorum)
- Coastal Ecuador smoky jungle frog (Leptodactylus peritoaktites)
- Leptodactylus watu
- Gaige's rapids frog (Paratelmatobius gaigeae)
- Ibitipoca dwarf frog (Physalaemus rupestris)
- Pseudopaludicola jazmynmcdonaldae

=== Allophrynidae ===
Tukeit Hill frogs

- Allophryne relicta

=== Centrolenidae ===
Glass frogs

- Celsiella vozmedianoi
- Centrolene altitudinalis
- Burrowes' giant glass frog (Centrolene ballux)
- Charapita glass frog (Centrolene charapita)
- El Cóndor glass frog (Centrolene condor)
- Basecamp giant glass frog (Centrolene hesperia)
- Huila glass frog (Centrolene huilensis)
- Lynch's giant glass frog (Centrolene lynchi)
- Medem's glass frog (Centrolene medemi)
- Boyaca giant glass frog (Centrolene petrophilum)
- Sanchez's giant glass frog (Centrolene sanchezi)
- Lonely cochran frog (Centrolene solitaria)
- Hyalinobatrachium anachoretus
- Hyalinobatrachium duranti
- Hyalinobatrachium esmeralda
- El Ávila glass frog (Hyalinobatrachium guairarepanense)
- Hyalinobatrachium orocostale
- Yaku glass frog (Hyalinobatrachium yaku)
- Anomalous glass frog (Nymphargus anomalus)
- Mindo glass frog (Nymphargus balionotus)
- Bolivian cochrean frog (Nymphargus bejaranoi)
- Buenaventura glass frog (Nymphargus buenaventura)
- Unadorned glass frog (Nymphargus cariticommatus)
- Nymphargus caucanus
- Peru cochran frog (Nymphargus chancas)
- Coloma's glass frog (Nymphargus colomai)
- Nymphargus cristinae
- Las Gralarias glass frog (Nymphargus lasgralarias)
- Laura's glass frog (Nymphargus laurae)
- Linda's glass frog (Nymphargus lindae)
- Nymphargus luminosus
- Nymphargus luteopunctatus
- Urrao cochran frog (Nymphargus megistus)
- Tutumbaro cochran frog (Nymphargus phenax)
- Pistipata cochran frog (Nymphargus pluvialis)
- Siren glass frog (Nymphargus siren)
- Tarapoto cochran frog (Rulyrana saxiscandens)
- Sachatamia electrops
- Vitreorana castroviejoi

=== Odontophrynidae ===
Odontophrynid frogs

- Proceratophrys bagnoi
- Proceratophrys redacta
- Proceratophrys sanctaritae

=== Cycloramphidae ===
Button frogs and allies

- Brazilian button frog (Cycloramphus brasiliensis)
- Izecksohn's button frog (Cycloramphus izecksohni)

=== Alsodidae ===
Spiny-chest frogs and allies

- Cabreira spiny-chest frog (Alsodes barrioi)
- Alsodes neuquensis
- Alsodes norae
- Alsodes valdiviensis
- Vanzolini's spiny-chest frog (Alsodes vanzolinii)
- Olive spint-chest frog (Alsodes verrucosus)
- Oncol's ground frog (Eupsophus altor)
- Contulmo ground frog (Eupsophus contulmoensis)
- Miguel's ground frog (Eupsophus migueli)
- Nahuelbuta ground frog (Eupsophus nahuelbutensis)
- Eupsophus septentrionalis

=== Hylodidae ===
Neotropical torrent frogs

- Crossodactylus cyclospinus
- Crossodactylus timbuhy
- Hylodes dactylocinus
- Sao Paulo tree toad (Hylodes magalhaesi)
- Santa Catarina tree toad (Hylodes nasus)
- Hylodes perere
- Phantasmarana boticariana
- Brazilian big-tooth toad (Phantasmarana massarti)

=== Telmatobiidae ===
Water frogs

- Atacama water frog (Telmatobius atacamensis)
- Junín riparian frog (Telmatobius brachydactylus)
- Shortsnout water frog (Telmatobius brevirostris)
- Ancash water frog (Telmatobius carrillae)
- Telmatobius chusmisensis
- Conteras' water frog (Telmatobius contrerasi)
- Titicaca water frog (Telmatobius culeus)
- Telmatobius gigas
- Calientes water frog (Telmatobius hauthali)
- Jujuy water frog (Telmatobius hypselocephalus)
- Piura water frog (Telmatobius ignavus)
- Allipaca water frog (Telmatobius intermedius)
- Cajamarca water frog (Telmatobius latirostris)
- Lake Junin frog (Telmatobius macrostomus)
- Marbled water frog (Telmatobius marmoratus)
- Telmatobius mayoloi
- Medanitos water frog (Telmatobius pinguiculus)
- Telmatobius pisanoi
- Flat-headed water frog (Telmatobius platycephalus)
- Huánuco water frog (Telmatobius punctatus)
- Andalgala water frog (Telmatobius scrocchii)
- Stephan's water frog (Telmatobius stephani)
- Zapahuira water frog (Telmatobius zapahuirensis)

=== Batrachylidae ===
Patagonia frogs and allies

- Zapala frog (Atelognathus praebasalticus)

=== Rhinodermatidae ===
Darwin's frogs

- Barrio's frog (Insuetophrynus acarpicus)
- Southern Darwin's frog (Rhinoderma darwinii)

=== Microhylidae ===
Narrow-mouthed frogs

- Anodonthyla emilei
- Anodonthyla hutchisoni
- Anodonthyla jeanbai
- Anodonthyla moramora
- Black-throated climbing frog (Anodonthyla nigrigularis)
- Anodonthyla pollicaris
- Madagascar climbing frog (Anodonthyla rouxae)
- Chiasmocleis papachibe
- Parker's humming frog (Chiasmocleis parkeri)
- Chiasmocleis sapiranga
- Chiasmocleis veracruz
- Choerophryne gudrunae
- Tapping nursery frog (Cophixalus aenigma)
- Pipping nursery frog (Cophixalus hosmeri)
- Morobe rainforest frog (Cophixalus sphagnicola)
- Cophyla berara
- Cophyla fortuna
- Cophyla noromalalae
- Cuenca nelson frog (Ctenophryne aequatorialis)
- Ctenophryne barbatula
- Ctenophryne carpish
- Elachistocleis erythrogaster
- Tanzania banana frog (Hoplophryne rogersi)
- Lenca sheep frog (Hypopachus guancasco)
- Kalophrynus cryptophonus
- Lowland grainy frog (Kalophrynus palmatissimus)
- Trueb's Madagascar treefrog (Madecassophryne truebae)
- Karunaratne's narrow-mouth frog (Microhyla karunaratnei)
- Laterite narrow-mouth frog (Microhyla laterite)
- Sri Lanka narrow-mouth frog (Microhyla zeylanica)
- Black-spotted paddy frog (Micryletta nigromaculata)
- Pretty narrow-mouth frog (Nanohyla pulchella)
- Oreophryne cameroni
- Lombok cross frog (Oreophryne monticola)
- Oreophryne picticrus
- Flores cross frog (Oreophryne rookmaakeri)
- Zimmer's cross frog (Oreophryne zimmeri)
- Paradoxophyla tiarano
- Madagascar giant treefrog (Platypelis alticola)
- Yellowish tree cophyline frog (Platypelis mavomavo)
- Nosy Be giant treefrog (Platypelis milloti)
- Platypelis olgae
- Platypelis ravus
- Four-spotted tree cophyline frog (Platypelis tetra)
- Tsaratanana giant treefrog (Platypelis tsaratananaensis)
- Plethodontohyla fonetana
- Plethodontohyla guentheri
- Chubby diamond frog (Rhombophryne botabota)
- Tsaratanana digging frog (Rhombophryne guentherpetersi)
- Rhombophryne longicrus
- Tiny digging frog (Rhombophryne minuta)
- Buried diamond frog (Rhombophryne nilevina)
- Rhombophryne ornata
- Regal saw-browned diamond frog (Rhombophryne regalis)
- Savaka diamond frog (Rhombophryne savaka)
- Guibé's digging frog (Rhombophryne serratopalpebrosa)
- Rhombophryne tany
- Nosy Be burrowing frog (Rhombophryne testudo)
- Rhombophryne vaventy
- Stumpffia analanjirofo
- Stumpffia be
- Malagasy rainbow frog (Scaphiophryne gottlebei)
- Stereocyclops palmipes
- Stumpffia garraffoi
- Stumpffia iharana
- Stumpffia kibomena
- Stumpffia madagascariensis
- Stumpffia miery
- Stumpffia nigrorubra
- Madagascar stump-toed frog (Stumpffia psologlossa)
- Andoany stump-toed frog (Stumpffia pygmaea)
- Stumpffia roseifemoralis
- Stumpffia sorata
- Stumpffia yanniki
- Nagao's globular frog (Uperodon nagaoi)
- Half-webbed pug-snout frog (Uperodon palmatus)

=== Brevicipitidae ===
Rain frogs

- Boston rain frog (Breviceps batrachophiliorum)
- Hansen's warty frog (Callulina hanseni)
- Mazumbai warty frog (Callulina kisiwamsitu)
- Lapham's warty frog (Callulina laphami)
- Shengena warty frog (Callulina shengena)
- Probreviceps loveridgei
- Usambara big-fingered frog (Probreviceps macrodactylus)
- Highland rain frog (Probreviceps rhodesianus)
- Uluguru forest frog (Probreviceps uluguruensis)

=== Hyperoliidae ===
African reed frogs

- Clarke's banana frog (Afrixalus clarkei)
- Spotted spiny reed frog (Afrixalus dorsimaculatus)
- Knysna banana frog (Afrixalus knysnae)
- Cameroon banana frog (Afrixalus lacteus)
- Mebebque frog (Arlequinus krebsi)
- Itombwe golden frog (Chrysobatrachus cupreonitens)
- Keith's striped frog (Hylambates keithae)
- Bamenda reed frog (Hyperolius ademetzi)
- Chela Mountain reed frog (Hyperolius chelaensis)
- Tigoni reed frog (Hyperolius cystocandicans)
- Hyperolius dintelmanni
- Hyperolius kihangensis
- Luvubu reed frog (Hyperolius leleupi)
- White-striped reed frog (Hyperolius leucotaenius)
- Hyperolius nienokouensis
- Mount Nimba reed frog (Hyperolius nimbae)
- Pickersgill's reed frog (Hyperolius pickersgilli)
- Hyperolius puncticulatus
- Hyperolius rubrovermiculatus
- São Tomé giant reed frog (Hyperolius thomensis)
- Hyperolius ukwiva
- Kassina jozani
- Seychelles island frog (Tachycnemis seychellensis)

=== Arthroleptidae ===
Screeching frogs

- Bioko squeaker frog (Arthroleptis bioko)
- Hidden squeaker frog (Arthroleptis fichika)
- Tiny squeaker frog (Arthroleptis kidogo)
- Arthroleptis langeri
- Nguru squeaker (Arthroleptis nguruensis)
- Arthroleptis nlonakoensis
- Perret's squeaker frog (Arthroleptis perreti)
- Tanzania screeching frog (Arthroleptis tanneri)
- Wager's bush squeaker (Arthroleptis wageri)
- Amani screeching frog (Arthroleptis xenodactylus)
- Laurent's night frog (Astylosternus laurenti)
- Perret's night frog (Astylosternus perreti)
- Central night frog (Astylosternus ranoides)
- Apouh night frog (Astylosternus schioetzi)
- Cardioglossa alsco
- Annulated long-fingered frog (Cardioglossa annulata)
- Mount Okou long-fingered frog (Cardioglossa oreas)
- Black long-fingered frog (Cardioglossa pulchra)
- Highland long-fingered frog (Cardioglossa venusta)
- Whitebelly egg frog (Leptodactylodon albiventris)
- Leptodactylodon blanci
- Leptodactylodon bueanus
- Mertens' egg frog (Leptodactylodon mertensi)
- Ornate egg frog (Leptodactylodon ornatus)
- Perret's egg frog (Leptodactylodon perreti)
- Leptodactylodon stevarti
- Young Itombwe forest treefrog (Leptopelis anebos)
- Kabembe treefrog (Leptopelis mtoewaate)
- Palm forest treefrog (Leptopelis palmatus)
- Parker's forest tree frog (Leptopelis parkeri)
- Susana's forest tree frog (Leptopelis susanae)
- Big-eyed tree frog (Leptopelis vermiculatus)
- Long-toed tree frog (Leptopelis xenodactylus)

=== Ptychadenidae ===
Grassland frogs

- Somali grassland frog (Ptychadena nana)
- Newton's grassland frog (Ptychadena newtoni)

=== Micrixalidae ===
Dancing frogs

- Beautiful dancing frog (Micrixalus adonis)
- White-cheeked dancing frog (Micrixalus candidus)
- Cold stream dancing frog (Micrixalus frigidus)
- Kalakkad dancing frog (Micrixalus fuscus)
- Kallar dancing frog (Micrixalus herrei)
- Kurichiyar dancing frog (Micrixalus kurichiyari)
- Mallan's dancing frog (Micrixalus mallani)
- Black-bellied dancing frog (Micrixalus nigraventris)
- Niluvase dancing frog (Micrixalus niluvasei)
- Naked dancing frog (Micrixalus nudis)
- Sairandhri dancing frog (Micrixalus sairandhri)
- Sali's dancing frog (Micrixalus sali)
- Forest dancing frog (Micrixalus silvaticus)
- Thampi's torrent frog (Micrixalus thampii)
- Northern dancing frog (Micrixalus uttaraghati)

=== Phrynobatrachidae ===
Puddle frogs

- Ambangulu puddle frog (Phrynobatrachus ambanguluensis)
- Danko puddle frog (Phrynobatrachus danko)
- Phrynobatrachus discogularis
- Krefft's puddle frog (Phrynobatrachus krefftii)
- Pakenham's river frog (Phrynobatrachus pakenhami)
- Phrynobatrachus pintoi
- Schiøtz’s puddle frog (Phrynobatrachus schioetzi)
- Phrynobatrachus ungujae

=== Conrauidae ===
Slippery frogs

- Goliath frog (Conraua goliath)

=== Petropedetidae ===
African torrent frogs

- Usambara torrent frog (Arthroleptides martiensseni)
- Petropedetes euskircheni
- Petropedetes juliawurstnerae

=== Pyxicephalidae ===
Box-headed frogs

- Inyangani river frog (Amietia inyangae)
- Johnston's river frog (Amietia johnstoni)
- Mistbelt chirping frog (Anhydrophryne ngongoniensis)
- Rattray's chirping frog (Anhydrophryne rattrayi)
- Hogsback dainty frog (Cacosternum thorini)
- Cape Flats frog (Microbatrachella capensis)
- Namúli mongrel frog (Nothophryne baylissi)
- Mongrel frog (Nothophryne broadleyi)
- Inago mongrel frog (Nothophryne inagoensis)
- Ribáuè mongrel frog (Nothophryne ribauensis)

=== Nyctibatrachidae ===
Robust frogs

- Nyctibatrachus aliciae
- Nyctibatrachus beddomii
- Dattatreya night frog (Nyctibatrachus dattatreyaensis)
- Giant wrinkled frog (Nyctibatrachus karnatakaensis)
- Nyctibatrachus minor
- Nyctibatrachus sanctipalustris
- Kalakad wrinkled frog (Nyctibatrachus vasanthi)

=== Ceratobatrachidae ===
Wrinkled ground frogs and allies

- Palawan eastern frog (Alcalus mariae)
- Saribau eastern frog (Alcalus sariba)
- Cornufer parilis
- Parker's wrinkled ground frog (Cornufer parkeri)
- Platymantis diesmosi
- Lawton's wrinkled ground frog (Platymantis lawtoni)
- Tablas wrinkled ground frog (Platymantis levigatus)
- Panay limestone frog (Platymantis paengi)
- Panay forest frog (Platymantis panayensis)
- Cave wrinkled ground frog (Platymantis spelaeus)
- Luzon wrinkled ground frog (Platymantis subterrestris)

=== Ranixalidae ===
Leaping frogs

- Beddome's leaping frog (Indirana beddomii)
- Rocky-terrain leaping frog (Indirana paramakri)
- Kerala Indian frog (Walkerana phrynoderma)

=== Dicroglossidae ===
Fork-tongued frogs

- Montane frog (Fejervarya greenii)
- Fejervarya nicobariensis
- Fejervarya nilagirica
- Limnonectes arathooni
- Limnonectes microtympanum
- Limnonectes namiyei
- Tanah Rata wart frog (Limnonectes nitidus)
- Minervarya sahyadris
- Nannophrys marmorata
- Nannophrys naeyakai
- Piebald spiny frog (Nanorana maculosa)
- Yunnan Asian frog (Nanorana unculuanus)
- Yunnan spiny frog (Nanorana yunnanensis)
- Boulenger's spiny frog (Quasipaa boulengeri)
- Quasipaa robertingeri

=== Rhacophoridae ===
Shrub frogs

- Ghatixalus variabilis
- Thorny tree frog (Gracixalus lumarius)
- Quyet's treefrog (Gracixalus quyeti)
- Liuixalus ocellatus
- Romer's tree frog (Liuixalus romeri)
- Mendolong bubble-nest frog (Philautus aurantium)
- Philautus disgregus
- Everett's flying frog (Philautus everetti)
- Kerangas bubble-nest frog (Philautus kerangae)
- Philautus neelanethrus
- Mindoro tree frog (Philautus schmackeri)
- Philautus similis
- Philautus surrufus
- Polypedates insularis
- Labungama shrub frog (Pseudophilautus abundus)
- Pseudophilautus alto
- Pseudophilautus asankai
- Pseudophilautus auratus
- Pseudophilautus caeruleus
- Pseudophilautus cavirostris
- Pseudophilautus cuspis
- Pseudophilautus decoris
- Pseudophilautus femoralis
- Pseudophilautus folicola
- Pseudophilautus frankenbergi
- Pseudophilautus fulvus
- Pseudophilautus limbus
- Bigfoot shrub frog (Pseudophilautus macropus)
- Pseudophilautus microtympanum
- Pseudophilautus mittermeieri
- Pseudophilautus mooreorum
- Pseudophilautus nemus
- Pseudophilautus pleurotaenia
- Pseudophilautus poppiae
- Pseudophilautus reticulatus
- Pseudophilautus sarasinorum
- Pseudophilautus schmarda
- Pseudophilautus silus
- Pseudophilautus silvaticus
- Sri Lanka short-horned shrub-frog (Pseudophilautus singu)
- Pseudophilautus steineri
- Pseudophilautus stuarti
- Sri Lanka petite shrub-frog (Pseudophilautus tanu)
- Pseudophilautus wynaadensis
- Pseudophilautus zorro
- Raorchestes charius
- Green eyed bushfrog (Raorchestes chlorosomma)
- Kaikatti bushfrog (Raorchestes kaikatti)
- Munnar bush frog (Raorchestes munnarensis)
- Raorchestes nerostagona
- Resplendent shrubfrog (Raorchestes resplendens)
- Raorchestes signatus
- Sushil's bushfrog (Raorchestes sushili)
- Raorchestes tinniens
- Raorchestes travancoricus
- Raorchestes viridis
- Rhacophorus angulirostris
- Rhacophorus arvalis
- Rhacophorus aurantiventris
- Kalakad gliding frog (Rhacophorus calcadensis)
- Vietnam flying frog (Rhacophorus calcaneus)
- Rhacophorus helenae
- Small tree frog (Rhacophorus lateralis)
- Rhacophorus minimus
- Rhacophorus vampyrus
- Rhacophorus yaoshanensis
- Taruga eques
- Taruga fastigo
- Taruga longinasus
- Chapa bug-eyed frog (Theloderma bicolor)
- Misty moss frog (Theloderma nebulosum)

=== Mantellidae ===
Mantellid frogs

- Aglyptodactylus australis
- Boophis andrangoloaka
- Boophis anjanaharibeensis
- Boophis arcanus
- Böhme's bright-eyed frog (Boophis boehmei)
- Boppa's bright-eyed treefrog (Boophis boppa)
- Boophis burgeri
- Boophis feonnyala
- Boophis haematopus
- Boophis haingana
- Jaeger's bright-eyed frog (Boophis jaegeri)
- Andinrgitra bright-eyed frog (Boophis laurenti)
- Boophis lilianae
- Boophis miadana
- Boophis narinsi
- Boophis piperatus
- Betsileo bright-eyed frog (Boophis rhodoscelis)
- Boophis sambirano
- Boophis sandrae
- Boophis solomaso
- Gephyromantis atsingy
- Gephyromantis azzurrae
- Gephyromantis corvus
- Eiselt's Madagascar frog (Gephyromantis eiselti)
- Gephyromantis hintelmannae
- Klemmer's Madagascar frog (Gephyromantis klemmeri)
- Gephyromantis ranjomavo
- Gephyromantis thelenae
- Webb's Madagascar frog (Gephyromantis webbi)
- Gephyromantis zavona
- Ring-wearing tree frog (Guibemantis annulatus)
- Watterson's tree frog (Guibemantis wattersoni)
- Golden mantella (Mantella aurantiaca)
- Bernhard's mantella (Mantella bernhardi)
- Cowan's mantella (Mantella cowanii)
- Yellow mantella (Mantella crocea)
- Blue-legged mantella (Mantella expectata)
- Green mantella (Mantella viridis)
- Andringitra Madagascar frog (Mantidactylus madecassus)
- Mantidactylus noralottae
- Mantidactylus paidroa
- Spinomantis brunae
- Guibe's bright-eyed frog (Spinomantis microtis)
- Tsingymantis antitra

=== Ranidae ===
True frogs

- Nkongsamba frog (Amnirana asperrima)
- Ivory coast frog (Amnirana occidentalis)
- Amolops hainanensis
- Hong Kong cascade frog (Amolops hongkongensis)
- Holst's frog (Babina holsti)
- Kampira Falls frog (Babina okinavana)
- Otton frog (Babina subaspera)
- Hylarana mangyanum
- Patzcuaro frog (Lithobates dunni)
- Lithobates johni
- Relict leopard frog (Lithobates onca)
- Amami tip-nosed frog (Odorrana amamiensis)
- Ishikawa's frog (Odorrana ishikawae)
- Kuang-wu Shan frog (Odorrana kuangwuensis)
- Ryukyu tip-nosed frog (Odorrana narina)
- Amami Oshima frog (Odorrana splendida)
- Greater tip-nosed frog (Odorrana supranarina)
- Odorrana utsunomiyaorum
- Odorrana yentuensis
- Cretan frog (Pelophylax cretensis)
- Karpathos frog (Pelophylax cerigensis)
- Albanian water frog (Pelophylax shqipericus)
- Pelophylax tenggerensis
- Mountain yellow-legged frog (Rana muscosa)
- Pyrenean frog (Rana pyrenaica)
- Rana sauteri
- Sierra Nevada yellow-legged frog (Rana sierrae)
- Rana tavasensis

== Gymnophiona ==
- Changamwensis African caecilian (Boulengerula changamwensis)
- Sagalla caecilian (Boulengerula niedeni)
- Taita African caecilian (Boulengerula taitana)
- Abitagua caecilian (Caecilia abitaguae)
- El Tambo caecilian (Epicrionops columbianus)
- Stejneger's caecilian (Hypogeophis alternans)
- Indian Ocean caecilian (Hypogeophis larvatus)
- Sharp-nosed caecilian (Hypogeophis rostratus)
- Seychelles caecilian (Hypogeophis sechellensis)
- Pattipola caecilian (Ichthyophis orthoplicatus)
- Malatgan River caecilian (Ichthyophis weberi)
- Praslin's caecilian (Praslinia cooperi)
- Two-lined caecilian (Rhinatrema shiv)
- Nyingwa caecilian (Scolecomorphus uluguruensis)

== See also ==
- Lists of IUCN Red List endangered species
- List of least concern amphibians
- List of near threatened amphibians
- List of vulnerable amphibians
- List of critically endangered amphibians
- List of recently extinct amphibians
- List of data deficient amphibians
