= Pristimantis repens =

Conservation status
- Endangered (IUCN 3.1)

Scientific classification
- Kingdom: Animalia
- Phylum: Chordata
- Class: Amphibia
- Order: Anura
- Clade: Brachycephaloidea
- Family: Craugastoridae
- Genus: Pristimantis
- Subgenus: Pristimantis
- Species: P. repens

Binomial name
- Pristimantis repens (Lynch, 1984)

Synonyms
- Eleutherodactylus repens Lynch, 1984

Species of frog

Pristimantis repens, known commonly as the Galeras robber frog, is a species of frog in the family Strabomantidae. It is endemic to the Colombian Massif in the Nariño Department, Colombia. The specific name repens is Latin for creeping or crawling, inferred to be its mode of locomotion based on its short limbs.

== Description ==
Adult males measure 13–17 mm (0.5–0.7 in) and adult females 18–24 mm (0.7–0.9 in) in snout–vent length. The snout is rounded. The tympanum is visible with a distinct annulus. All toes and all but the innermost finger bear small discs; no lateral keels nor webbing are present. The dorsal skin is shagreened anteriorly, turning tuberculate posteriorly and granular laterally. The dorsum is brown or olive with dark brown marking. The lower surfaces are olive-brown. The groin and other concealed surfaces of the limbs are pale red. The lips have white lines.

== Habitat and conservation ==
Pristimantis repens occurs in sub-páramo and páramo as well as high-Andean forest habitats at elevations of 3,150–3,720 m (10,330–12,200 ft) above sea level. Specimens have been found under rocks or inside the sparse páramo vegetation. Breeding is by direct development (i.e., there is no free-living larval stage).

Pristimantis repens was common at its type locality, the Galeras volcano. The area has little human activity, but the population could be threatened by the eruption of this active volcano. Galeras is designated as a Fauna and Flora Sanctuary.
