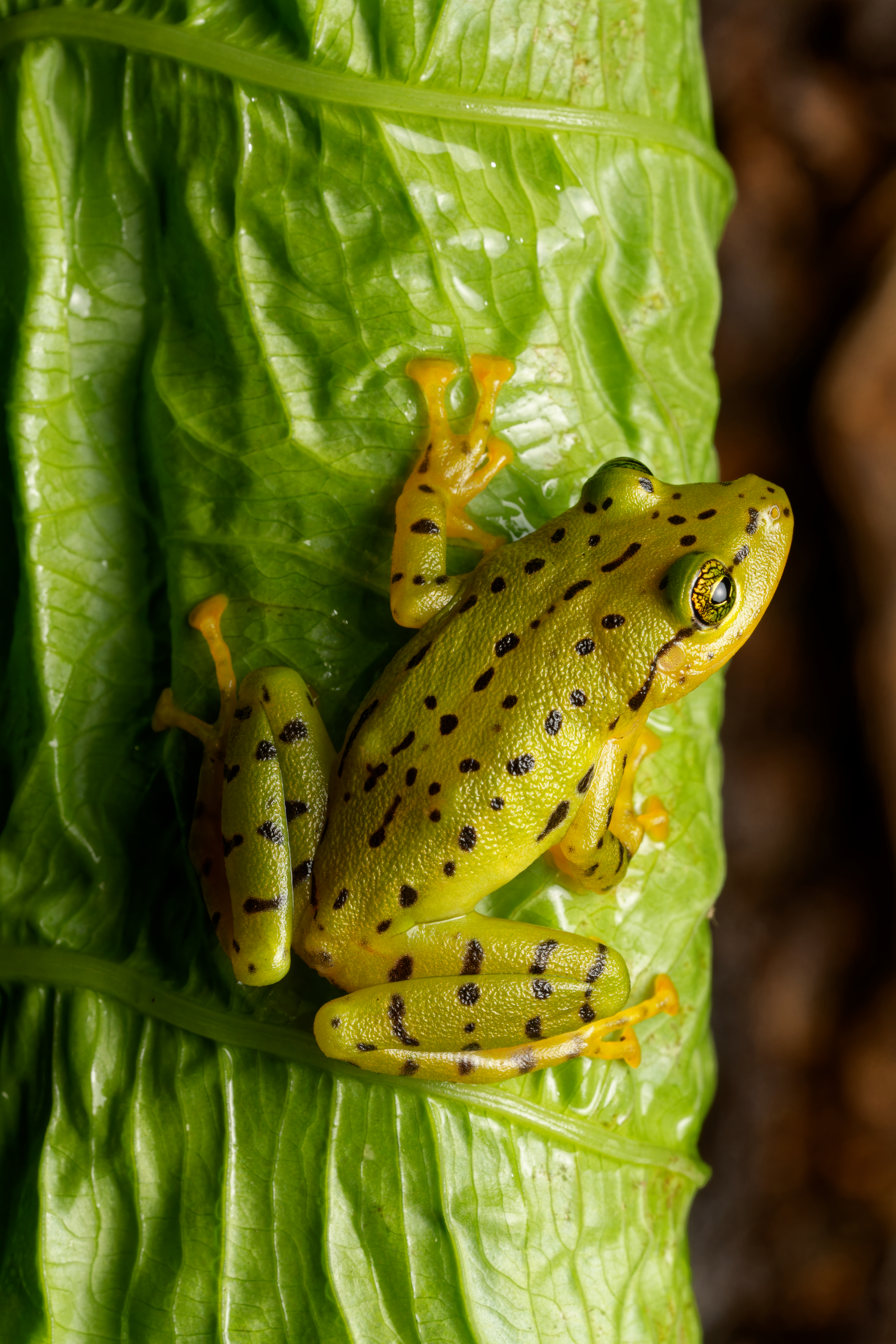
- Prisrimantis ornatissimus is primarily arboreal, as shown here sitting on a leaf.

Conservation status
- Endangered (IUCN 3.1)

Scientific classification
- Kingdom: Animalia
- Phylum: Chordata
- Class: Amphibia
- Order: Anura
- Family: Strabomantidae
- Genus: Pristimantis
- Species: P. ornatissimus

Binomial name
- Pristimantis ornatissimus (Despax, 1911)

Synonyms
- Eleutherodactylus ornatissimus Despax, 1911

= Pristimantis ornatissimus =

Species of frog

Pristimantis ornatissimus is a species of frog in the family Strabomantidae. It is endemic to Ecuador. Its natural habitats are tropical moist lowland forests and moist montane forests, at altitudes of 400–1800 meters. It lives among bromeliads, Heliconia, and fronds of palms such as Ceroxylon and Wettinia. It can also be found in plantations of banana (Musa paradisiaca) and sugar cane (Saccharum officinarum) that border native forests. It is threatened by habitat loss.

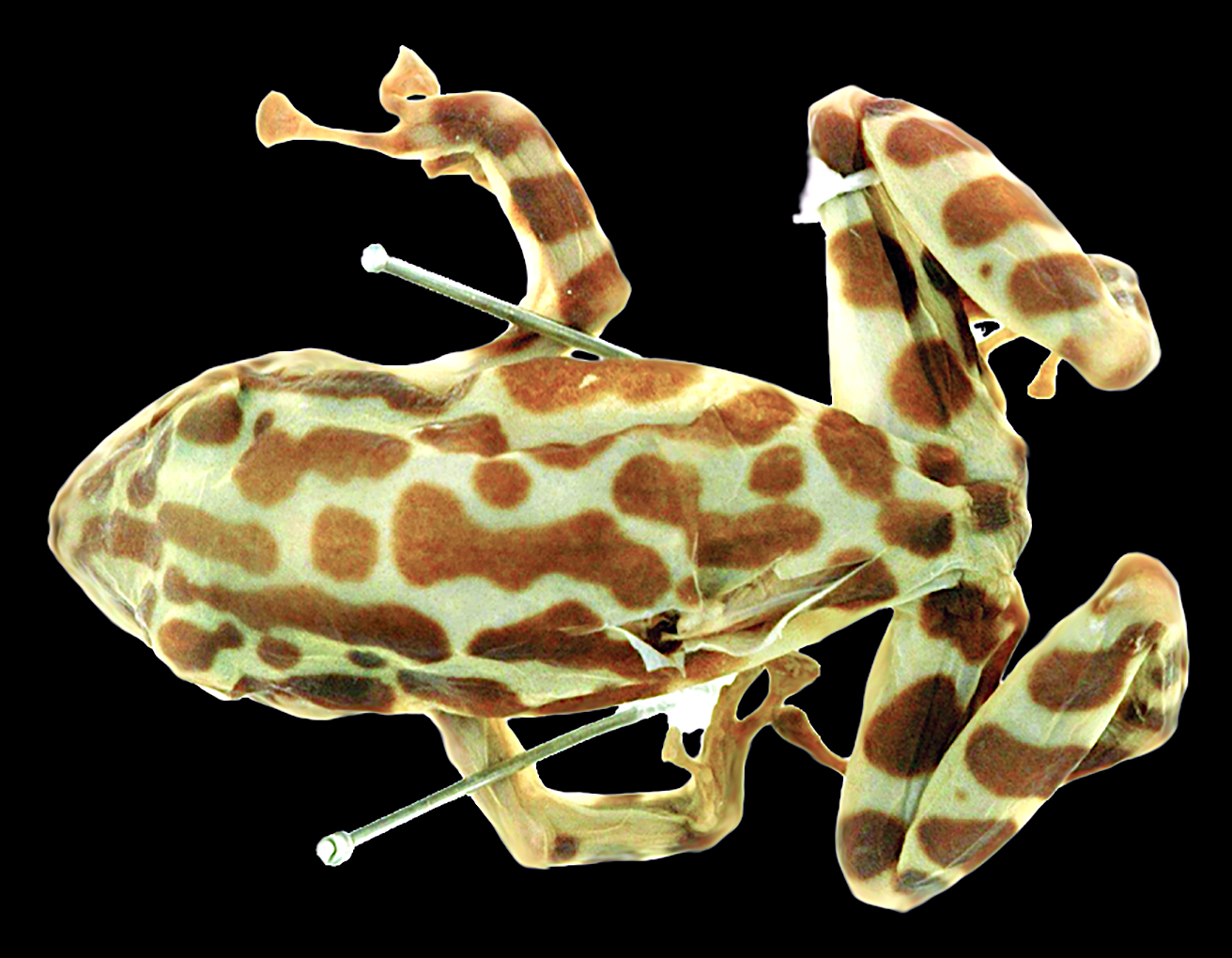
A preserved Museum specimen of Prisrimantis ornatissimus
