= Pristimantis metabates =

Conservation status
- Endangered (IUCN 3.1)

Scientific classification
- Kingdom: Animalia
- Phylum: Chordata
- Class: Amphibia
- Order: Anura
- Clade: Brachycephaloidea
- Family: Craugastoridae
- Genus: Pristimantis
- Species: P. metabates

Binomial name
- Pristimantis metabates (Duellman & Pramuk, 1999)

Synonyms
- Eleutherodactylus metabates Duellman & Pramuk, 1999

Species of frog

Pristimantis metabates is a species of frog in the family Strabomantidae. It is known from the Bagua Province of Amazonas Region of Peru and Zamora-Chinchipe Province of southern Ecuador. Its natural habitats are tropical moist forests, especially near streams.
