= Pristimantis myops =

Conservation status
- Endangered (IUCN 3.1)

Scientific classification
- Kingdom: Animalia
- Phylum: Chordata
- Class: Amphibia
- Order: Anura
- Family: Strabomantidae
- Genus: Pristimantis
- Species: P. myops

Binomial name
- Pristimantis myops (Lynch, 1998)

Synonyms
- Eleutherodactylus myops Lynch, 1998

Species of frog

Pristimantis myops is a species of frog in the family Strabomantidae. It is endemic to Colombia and known from the Cordillera Occidental in Antioquia, Chocó, and Valle del Cauca Departments. The specific name myops is Greek meaning "near-sighted", in allusion to the interocular fold that resembles the bridge of a pair of glasses, as well as to the small size of these frogs, which forced the species describer to wear reading glass while collecting them.

== Description ==
Adult males measure 11–14 mm (0.4–0.6 in) and adult females 15–17 mm (0.6–0.7 in) in snout–vent length. The snout is subovoid in dorsal view and rounded in profile. The canthus rostralis is rounded and concave. A fleshy fold is present between the eyes. The tympanum is round. Skin of the dorsum bears numerous flattened warts. The fingers and the toes have lateral fringes and, except for the first finger, discs; no webbing is present. Dorsal coloration is brown to reddish brown, rarely pale green with darker markings. The ventral surfaces mostly black, but the undersides of the legs are orange or red. There is a cream or yellow blotch on the lower flank/groin. The anterior surfaces of the thighs are reddish-orange. Males have a subgular vocal sac.

== Habitat and conservation ==
Pristimantis myops occurs in vegetation close to the forest floor (no higher than 1 m (3 ft 3 in) above the ground) in primary forest and forest edges at elevations of 1,550–2,250 m (5,090–7,380 ft) above sea level. They have cryptic coloration and are very easy to overlook.

This species is threatened by habitat loss caused by the cultivation of crops and livestock farming, as well as chemical pollution from spraying of the crops. The presumed range of this species overlaps with some protected areas.
