= Pristimantis angustilineatus =

Conservation status
- Endangered (IUCN 3.1)

Scientific classification
- Kingdom: Animalia
- Phylum: Chordata
- Class: Amphibia
- Order: Anura
- Family: Strabomantidae
- Genus: Pristimantis
- Species: P. angustilineatus

Binomial name
- Pristimantis angustilineatus (Lynch, 1998)

Synonyms
- Eleutherodactylus angustilineatus Lynch, 1998; Eleutherodactylus angustilineata Lynch, 1998; Pristimantis angustilineata (Lynch, 1998)

Species of frog

Pristimantis angustilineatus is a species of frog in the family Strabomantidae. It is endemic to Colombia and known from the Cordillera Occidental in Chocó, Risaralda, and Valle del Cauca Departments, at elevations of 1,700–2,500 m (5,600–8,200 ft) asl. The specific name angustilineatus refers to the narrow white dorsolateral lines and comes from Latin angustus (="narrow") and lineatus (="of a line").

== Description ==
Pristimantis angustilineatus are small frogs with adult males measuring 16–20 mm (0.63–0.79 in) and females 21–25 mm (0.83–0.98 in) in snout–vent length. Head is broader than body and longer than wide. Skin of dorsum is smooth, without folds; skin of venter is areolate. The body is yellow or yellowish-green above with some brown flecking dorsally (some individuals are nearly red above). Dorsolateral stripe is yellow and bordered below by brown to nearly black. Vocal sac is pale yellow. Parietal peritoneum is metallic white. Upper eyelid is pale green and iris is reddish-brown or copper with black reticulation.

== Habitat and conservation ==
Pristimantis angustilineatus lives in cloud forests, occurring on low herbaceous vegetation or on epiphytic vegetation. It is a locally common species but threatened by habitat loss caused by expanding agricultural activities.
