= Pristimantis serendipitus =

Conservation status
- Endangered (IUCN 3.1)

Scientific classification
- Kingdom: Animalia
- Phylum: Chordata
- Class: Amphibia
- Order: Anura
- Clade: Brachycephaloidea
- Family: Craugastoridae
- Genus: Pristimantis
- Subgenus: Pristimantis
- Species: P. serendipitus

Binomial name
- Pristimantis serendipitus (Duellman and Pramuk, 1999)

Synonyms
- Eleutherodactylus serendipitus Duellman and Pramuk, 1999

Species of frog

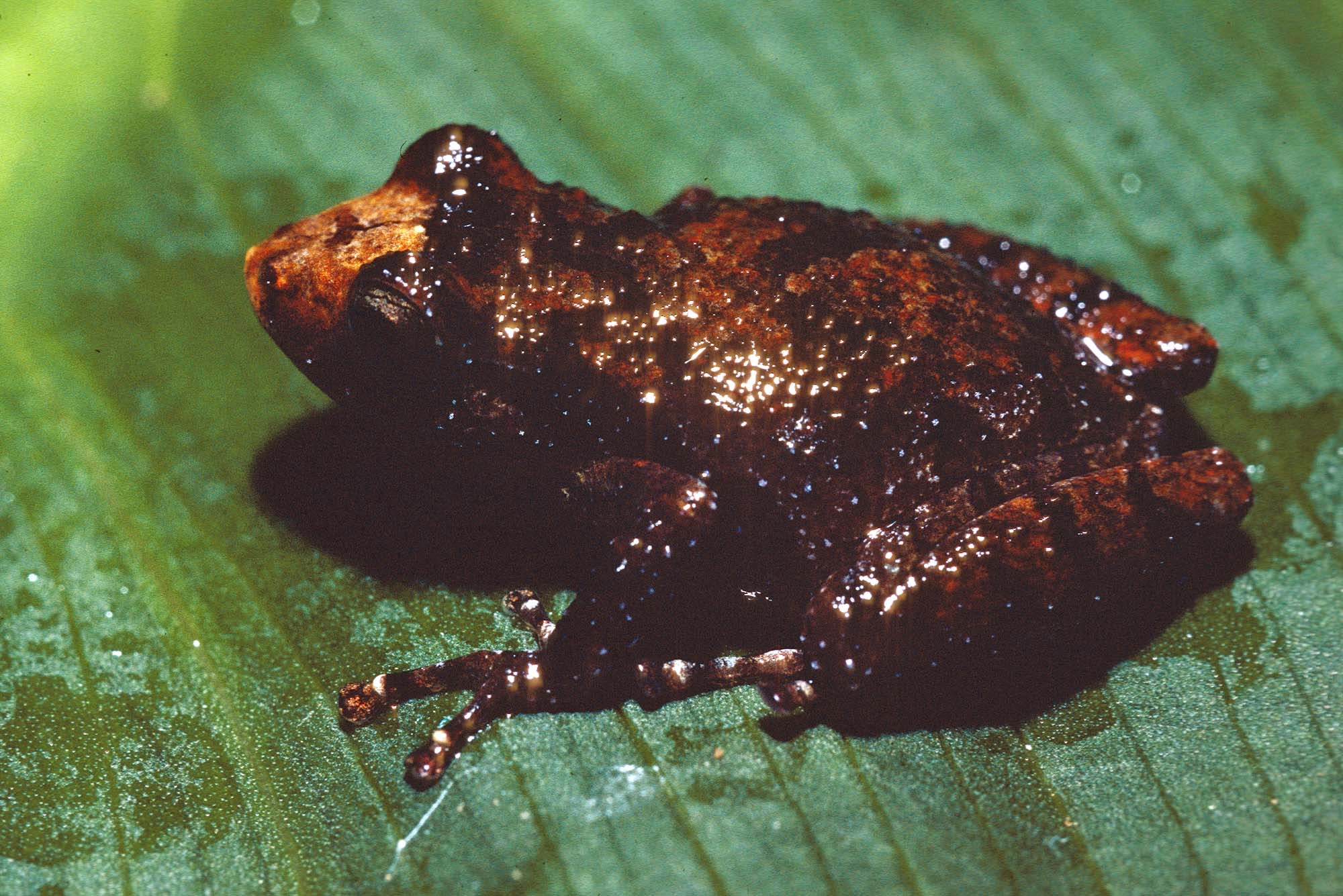
Pristimantis serendipitus

Pristimantis serendipitus is a species of frog in the family Strabomantidae. It is found in the Andes of northern Peru and adjacent southern Ecuador. The specific name refers to serendipitous discovery of this species: collection at the type locality was only made because the road was closed by an accident. Common name Colan Mountains robber frog has been proposed for this species.

== Description ==
Adult males measure 20–21 mm (0.8–0.8 in) in SVL; adult females are unknown but a subadult female measured 22 mm (0.9 in) in SVL. The snout is moderately long. The tympanic annulus is distinct. The fingers and toes bear discs but neither webbing nor lateral fringes. Skin is dorsally finely tuberculate. Coloration in pale gray at night and brown with darker marking by day. The venter is gray while the throat is yellow; both are heavily flecked with gray. The iris is dull bronze with median, horizontal red-brown streak.

== Habitat and conservation ==
Pristimantis serendipitus occurs in tropical montane forests at elevations of 1,700–1,850 m (5,580–6,070 ft) above sea level. Calling males have been recorded at night on leaves of low herbaceous plants in highly disturbed, humid, upper montane forest. Female and juveniles have been found on a bush near a stream and in leaf-litter in humid montane forest. Presumably, as in other Pristimantis, development is direct (i.e., there is no free-living larval stage).

It is threatened by habitat loss caused by selective logging and agriculture. The range of this species overlaps with the Cordillera de Colán National Sanctuary (Peru), and it has been recorded from Podocarpus National Park.
