= Rhinella arborescandens =

Conservation status
- Endangered (IUCN 3.1)

Scientific classification
- Kingdom: Animalia
- Phylum: Chordata
- Class: Amphibia
- Order: Anura
- Family: Bufonidae
- Genus: Rhinella
- Species: R. arborescandens

Binomial name
- Rhinella arborescandens (Duellman and Schulte, 1992)

Synonyms
- Bufo arborescandens Duellman and Schulte, 1992; Chaunus arborescandens (Duellman and Schulte, 1992)

Species of amphibian

Rhinella arborescandens is a species of toad in the family Bufonidae. It is endemic to Peru and only known from its type locality near Mendoza, northern Cordillera Central, in the Amazonas Region. It is unusual among Rhinella toads because it is arboreal, hence the specific name arborescandens, derived from Latin arbor for tree and scando meaning to climb.

== Description ==
Rhinella arborescandens is a small and robust-bodied toad. The type series consists of an adult male (the holotype) measuring 35 mm (1.4 in) and an adult female measuring 38 mm (1.5 in) in snout–vent length. The dorsum is reddish brown, and the male had a pale yellow mid-dorsal stripe. The parotoid gland is ovoid. The cranial crests are absent, as is the tympanum. The skin bears evenly distributed, small tubercles.

Rhinella arborescandens is only known from its type locality near Mendoza

== Habitat and conservation ==
The natural habitat of Rhinella arborescandens is montane tropical rainforest. The type specimens were found in bromeliads some 5–6 metres above the ground at an elevation of about 2,400 m (7,900 ft) above sea level; it shares this microhabitat with Pristimantis schultei. The location is unprotected, but the threats to this little known species are unknown.
