= Pristimantis dissimulatus =

Conservation status
- Endangered (IUCN 3.1)

Scientific classification
- Kingdom: Animalia
- Phylum: Chordata
- Class: Amphibia
- Order: Anura
- Clade: Brachycephaloidea
- Family: Craugastoridae
- Genus: Pristimantis
- Species: P. dissimulatus

Binomial name
- Pristimantis dissimulatus (Lynch & Duellman, 1997)

Synonyms
- Eleutherodactylus dissimulatus Lynch & Duellman, 1997

Species of frog

Pristimantis dissimulatus is a species of frogs in the family Strabomantidae.

It is endemic to Ecuador. Its natural habitat is tropical moist montane forests. It is threatened by habitat loss.
