= Pristimantis actinolaimus =

Conservation status
- Endangered (IUCN 3.1)

Scientific classification
- Kingdom: Animalia
- Phylum: Chordata
- Class: Amphibia
- Order: Anura
- Family: Strabomantidae
- Genus: Pristimantis
- Subgenus: Pristimantis
- Species: P. actinolaimus

Binomial name
- Pristimantis actinolaimus (Lynch and Rueda-Almonacid, 1998)
- Pristimantis actinolaimus is only known from Samaná in the Cordillera Central of Colombia.

Synonyms
- Eleutherodactylus actinolaimus Lynch and Rueda-Almonacid, 1998

Species of amphibian

Pristimantis actinolaimus is a frog species in the family Strabomantidae. It is endemic to Colombia and only known from the vicinity of its type locality, El Estadero, in Samaná, Caldas Department, on the eastern slopes of the Cordillera Central. The specific name actinolaimus is derived from the Greek aktinos (=ray) and laimos (=throat) and refers to the radiating lines on the throat of this frog.

== Description ==
Adult males measure 22–28 mm (0.9–1.1 in) and adult females 32–36 mm (1.3–1.4 in) in snout–vent length. The head is narrower than the body and longer than it is wide. The snout is long, nearly acuminate in dorsal view and rounded in lateral view. The upper eyelid bears a subconical tubercle. The tympanum is round but its upper edge is hidden by the supratympanic fold. All fingers and toes have expanded discs and broad pads, but those of toes are smaller. The dorsum is olive-brown or greenish-yellow with dark green canthal–supratympanic stripe and interorbital bar. The sides of the head are yellowish with narrow brown labial bars. The flanks bears broad, olive-green, diagonal bars. The groin and concealed surfaces of thighs are rosy-yellow. The posterior surfaces of thighs have tiny white—or rarely—yellow spots. The ventral surfaces are yellow to rosy-yellow with reddish-brown radiating lines on the throat and minute brown flecks over the venter. The iris is bright yellow in females but red or orange in males.

== Habitat and conservation ==
Pristimantis actinolaimus occurs in the understory of primary humid forest at elevations of 1,940–2,200 m (6,360–7,220 ft) above sea level. The type series was collected from low vegetation, no higher than 1.5 m above the ground. The eggs are laid on the ground and have direct development (i.e., there is no free-living larval stage). It is a rare species that outside its type locality is threatened by habitat loss caused by logging, agriculture, and pine plantations. It is present in the Selva de Florencia National Natural Park.
