= Pristimantis viridicans =

Conservation status
- Endangered (IUCN 3.1)

Scientific classification
- Kingdom: Animalia
- Phylum: Chordata
- Class: Amphibia
- Order: Anura
- Clade: Brachycephaloidea
- Family: Craugastoridae
- Genus: Pristimantis
- Species: P. viridicans

Binomial name
- Pristimantis viridicans (Lynch, 1977)

Synonyms
- Eleutherodactylus viridicans Lynch, 1977

Species of frog

Pristimantis viridicans is a species of frog in the family Strabomantidae. It is endemic to Colombia. Its natural habitat is tropical moist montane forests. It is threatened by habitat loss.
