= Pristimantis minimus =

Scientific classification
- Kingdom: Animalia
- Phylum: Chordata
- Class: Amphibia
- Order: Anura
- Family: Strabomantidae
- Genus: Pristimantis
- Species: P. minimus

Binomial name
- Pristimantis minimus Terán-Valdez and Guayasamin, 2010

Species of amphibian

Pristimantis minimus is a minute frog from the family Strabomantidae. It is found in the Cordillera del Cóndor at elevations between 1,250–1,685 m (4,101–5,528 ft) asl on either side of the valley of the Rio Nangaritza, in the Zamora-Chinchipe Province of Ecuador. The species is the smallest known frog found in Ecuador to date, and is the smallest in the genus Pristimantis. It is suggested that this miniaturization is an adaptation to resource-poor environments.

== Description ==
Males of Pristimantis minimus grow to a mean size of 12.2 mm (0.48 in) in snout–vent length (range: 9.5–13.7 mm (0.37–0.54 in)). Females are somewhat larger, 15.3–18.9 mm (0.60–0.74 in) in snout–vent length. Dorsum is smooth to slightly shagreen. Finger and toe pads are expanded. Iris is red with thin black reticulation.

== Reproduction ==
Vocalizations by males are unknown, but males have vocal slits and it suggested that they produce soft calls. Clutch size is about three eggs only, but it is probable that this species lays several clutches of eggs during its reproductive season.

== Habitat ==
These frogs inhabit the dwarf forests of the Cordillera del Cóndor. Individuals were active during night on vegetation, 25–200 cm above ground.
