= Rhinella lindae =

Conservation status
- Endangered (IUCN 3.1)

Scientific classification
- Kingdom: Animalia
- Phylum: Chordata
- Class: Amphibia
- Order: Anura
- Family: Bufonidae
- Genus: Rhinella
- Species: R. lindae

Binomial name
- Rhinella lindae (Rivero and Castaño, 1990)

Synonyms
- Rhamphophryne lindae Rivero and Castaño, 1990

Species of toad

Rhinella lindae is a species of toad in the family Bufonidae. It is endemic to Colombia and known from its type locality, Murri in the municipality of Frontino, and from Las Orquídeas National Natural Park, both on the western slope of the Cordillera Occidental, Antioquia Department. The specific name lindae honors Linda Trueb, an American herpetologist. However, common name Murri beaked toad has been coined for this species.

== Description ==
The holotype, an adult female, measures 62 mm (2.4 in), whereas the paratype male—of unknown maturity status—measures 30 mm (1.2 in) in snout–vent length. The snout is long and acuminate. In the female, tympanic annulus is present but the tympanic membrane is poorly differentiated; in the male, no tympanic annulus is present. The parotoid glands are ovoid but depressed and not very conspicuous. Dorsal skin is studded with minute granules extending to eyelids that show a crest. The fingers are one quarter webbed whereas the toes are extensively webbed. The upper parts are opaque black to dark brown with light yellow or olive green spots and dots. The venter is yellow or olive green with brown or black spots. The eye is coffee-colored.

== Habitat and conservation ==
Rhinella lindae is a terrestrial frog occurring in wet primary forest by creeks at elevations of 1,400–1,800 m (4,600–5,900 ft) above sea level. Individuals have been found in leaf litter and perching on rocks and in low vegetation. Reproduction is unknown.

It is a rare species that is threatened by habitat loss caused by agriculture, livestock, and illegal mining. The Las Orquídeas National Park site is subject to logging.
