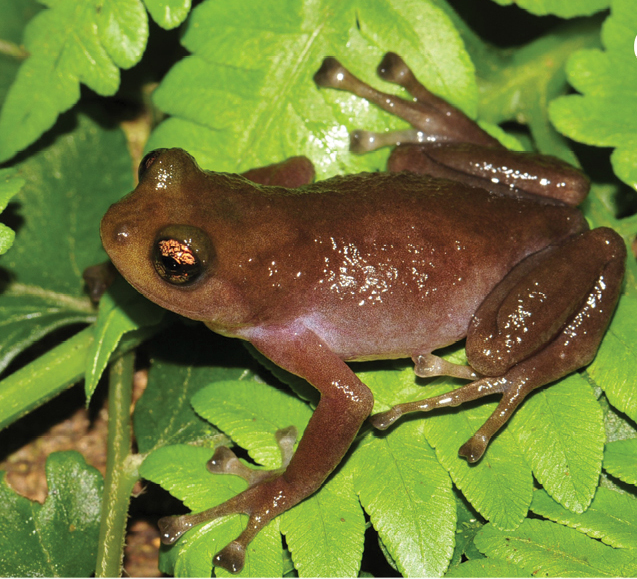
- Photograph in life of Platypelis alticola from the Sorata Massif.

Conservation status
- Endangered (IUCN 3.1)

Scientific classification
- Kingdom: Animalia
- Phylum: Chordata
- Class: Amphibia
- Order: Anura
- Family: Microhylidae
- Subfamily: Cophylinae
- Genus: Platypelis
- Species: P. alticola

Binomial name
- Platypelis alticola (Guibé, 1974)

= Platypelis alticola =

Species of frog

Platypelis alticola is a species of frog in the family Microhylidae. It is endemic to Madagascar. Its natural habitat is subtropical or tropical moist montane forests. It is threatened by habitat loss.

== Sources ==
- IUCN SSC Amphibian Specialist Group (2016). "Cophyla alticola". IUCN Red List of Threatened Species. 2016 e.T57954A84179073. doi:10.2305/IUCN.UK.2016-1.RLTS.T57954A84179073.en.
