= Pristimantis citriogaster =

Conservation status
- Endangered (IUCN 3.1)

Scientific classification
- Kingdom: Animalia
- Phylum: Chordata
- Class: Amphibia
- Order: Anura
- Family: Strabomantidae
- Genus: Pristimantis
- Species: P. citriogaster

Binomial name
- Pristimantis citriogaster (Duellman, 1992)

Synonyms
- Eleutherodactylus citriogaster Duellman, 1992

Species of frog

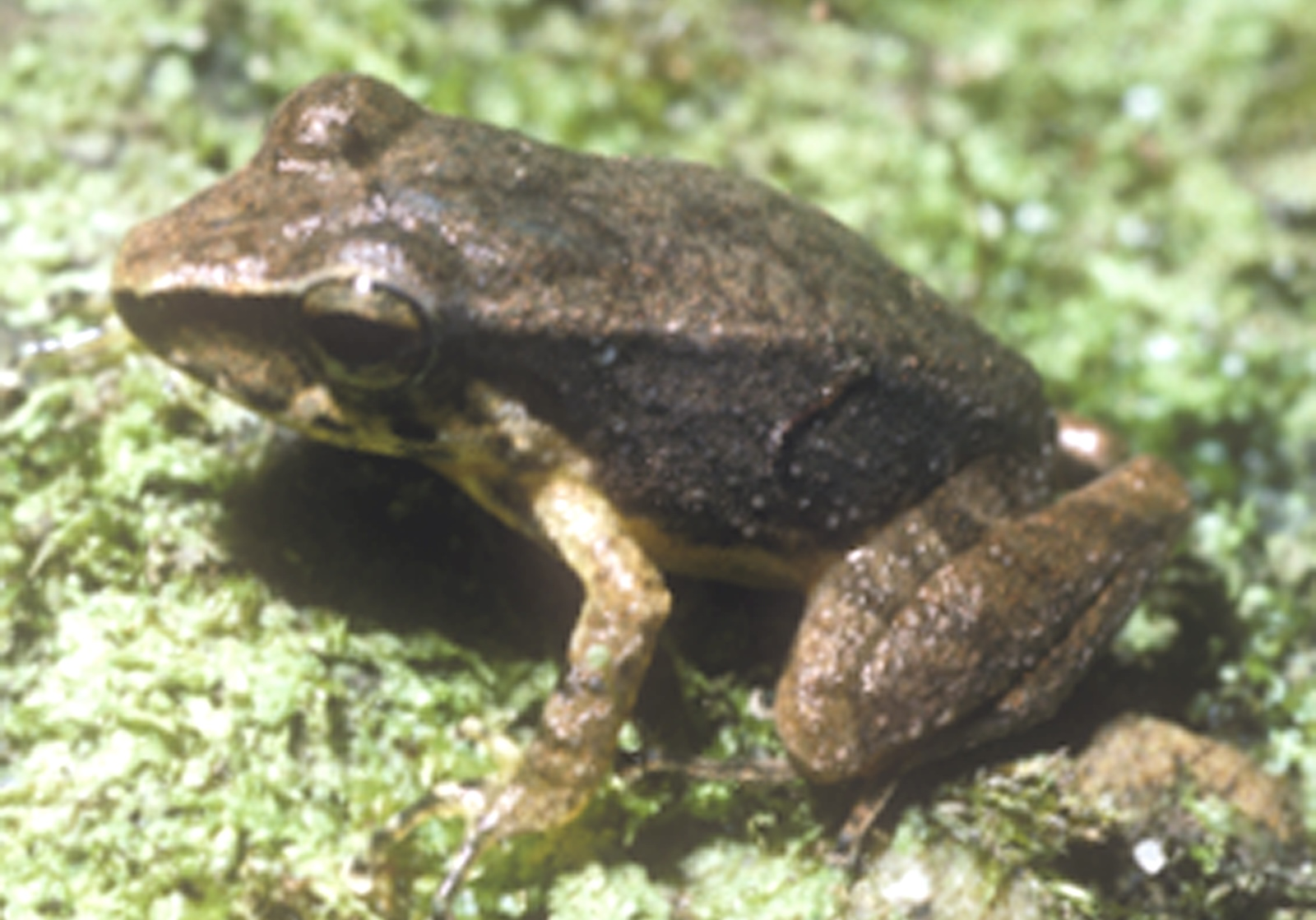
Pristimantis citriogaster

Pristimantis citriogaster, also known as the throated robber frog, is a species of frog in the family Strabomantidae. It is known from northern Peru near Tarapoto (the type locality) and south-eastern Ecuador. Its natural habitats are premontane rainforest and cloud forest. Adults are nocturnal and typically occur on rocks in and along cascading streams. Its altitudinal range is 600–1,094 m (1,969–3,589 ft) asl.

Pristimantis citriogaster is threatened by habitat loss.

== Description ==
Pristimantis citriogaster has a characteristic bright yellow belly (as alluded to in its name). Skin on dorsum is shagreen without tubercles. Tympanum is distinct.
