= Dendropsophus gryllatus =

Conservation status
- Endangered (IUCN 3.1)

Scientific classification
- Kingdom: Animalia
- Phylum: Chordata
- Class: Amphibia
- Order: Anura
- Family: Hylidae
- Genus: Dendropsophus
- Species: D. gryllatus

Binomial name
- Dendropsophus gryllatus (Duellman, 1973)

Species of frog

Dendropsophus gryllatus is a species of frog in the family Hylidae. It is endemic to Ecuador. Its natural habitats are subtropical or tropical moist lowland forests, freshwater marshes, and plantations . It is threatened by habitat loss.
