= Pristimantis quantus =

Conservation status
- Endangered (IUCN 3.1)

Scientific classification
- Kingdom: Animalia
- Phylum: Chordata
- Class: Amphibia
- Order: Anura
- Clade: Brachycephaloidea
- Family: Craugastoridae
- Genus: Pristimantis
- Species: P. quantus

Binomial name
- Pristimantis quantus (Lynch, 1998)

Synonyms
- Eleutherodactylus quantus Lynch, 1998

Species of frog

Pristimantis quantus is a species of frog in the family Strabomantidae. It is endemic to Colombia. Its natural habitat is tropical moist montane forests. It is threatened by habitat loss.
