= Pristimantis petrobardus =

Conservation status
- Endangered (IUCN 3.1)

Scientific classification
- Kingdom: Animalia
- Phylum: Chordata
- Class: Amphibia
- Order: Anura
- Clade: Brachycephaloidea
- Family: Craugastoridae
- Genus: Pristimantis
- Species: P. petrobardus

Binomial name
- Pristimantis petrobardus (Duellman, 1991)

Synonyms
- Eleutherodactylus petrobardus Duellman, 1991

Species of frog

Pristimantis petrobardus

Pristimantis petrobardus is a species of frog in the family Strabomantidae. It is endemic to Peru. Its natural habitats are tropical moist montane forests and tropical high-altitude shrubland.
