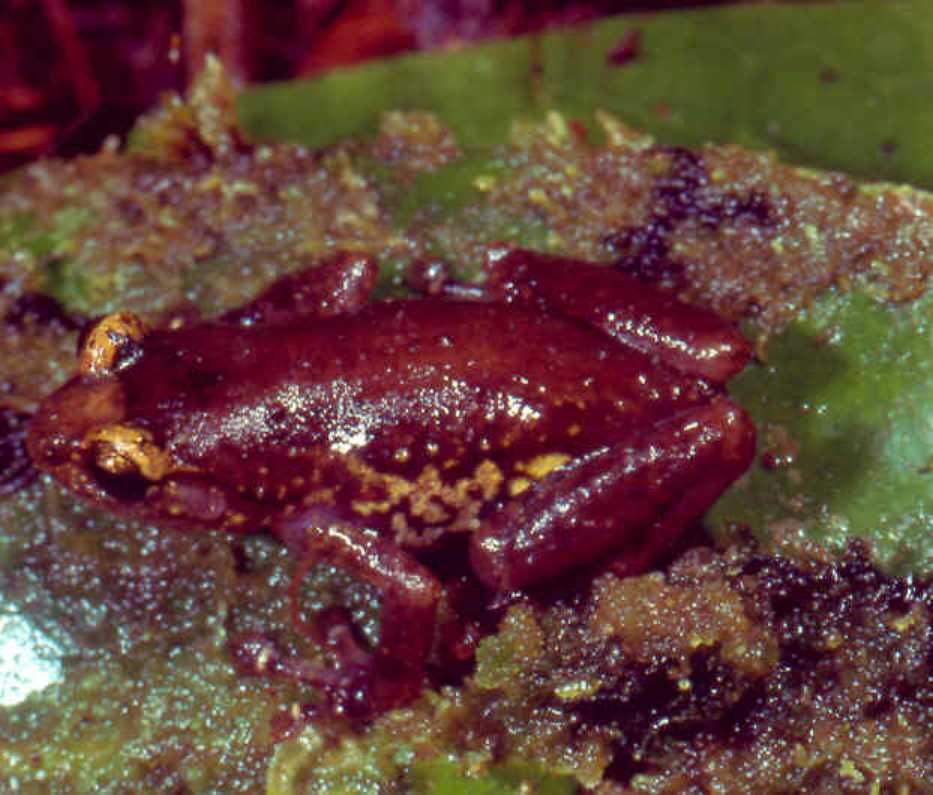

Conservation status
- Vulnerable (IUCN 3.1)

Scientific classification
- Kingdom: Animalia
- Phylum: Chordata
- Class: Amphibia
- Order: Anura
- Family: Microhylidae
- Subfamily: Cophylinae
- Genus: Platypelis
- Species: P. tsaratananaensis

Binomial name
- Platypelis tsaratananaensis Guibé, 1974

= Platypelis tsaratananaensis =

Species of frog

Platypelis tsaratananaensis is a species of frog in the family Microhylidae.

The amphibian is endemic to northern Madagascar.

== Distribution ==
The natural habitat of Platypelis tsaratananaensis is subtropical or tropical moist montane forests. It inhabits tall montane rainforest and bamboo groves, and is probably not found outside mature forest, and is probably restricted to altitudes above 1,100 metres (3,600 ft).

It is found almost exclusively found on bamboo, and may benefit from the presence of the Daubentonia madagascariensis (nocturnal lemur) for the creation of holes in the bamboo.

It breeds in bamboo stems by larval development.

== Conservation ==
It is threatened by habitat loss due to subsistence agriculture, timber extraction, charcoal manufacture, spread of invasive eucalyptus trees, livestock grazing, and expanding human settlements.

== Sources ==
- IUCN SSC Amphibian Specialist Group (2020). "Cophyla tsaratananaensis". IUCN Red List of Threatened Species. 2020 e.T57963A176223831. doi:10.2305/IUCN.UK.2020-3.RLTS.T57963A176223831.en.
- Current IUCN Red List of all Threatened Species
