= Pristimantis susaguae =

Conservation status
- Endangered (IUCN 3.1)

Scientific classification
- Kingdom: Animalia
- Phylum: Chordata
- Class: Amphibia
- Order: Anura
- Clade: Brachycephaloidea
- Family: Craugastoridae
- Genus: Pristimantis
- Species: P. susaguae

Binomial name
- Pristimantis susaguae (Rueda-Almonacid, Lynch & Galvis, 2003)

Synonyms
- Eleutherodactylus susaguae Rueda-Almonacid, Lynch & Galvis, 2003

Species of amphibian

Pristimantis susaguae is a species of frog in the family Strabomantidae. It is endemic to Colombia. Its natural habitats are tropical moist montane forests and rivers. It is threatened by habitat loss.

== Etymology and habitat ==
The species name "susaguae" is taken from the Susaguá River in which hydrographic basin the frog has been found. Susaguá is Chibcha, the language spoken by the Muisca who inhabited the area where the toad has been found; the Reserve Forest of Zipaquirá and Cogua, Colombia. It has an altitudinal range of 2,530 metres (8,300 ft) to 2,900 metres (9,500 ft) above sea level, and it might occur more widely than is currently known.
