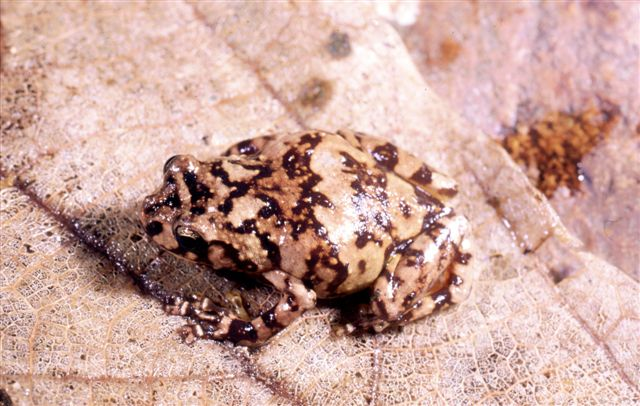

Conservation status
- Endangered (IUCN 3.1)

Scientific classification
- Kingdom: Animalia
- Phylum: Chordata
- Class: Amphibia
- Order: Anura
- Family: Microhylidae
- Subfamily: Cophylinae
- Genus: Platypelis
- Species: P. mavomavo

Binomial name
- Platypelis mavomavo Andreone, Fenolio & Walvoord, 2003

= Platypelis mavomavo =

Species of frog

Platypelis mavomavo is a species of frog in the family Microhylidae. It is endemic to Madagascar. Its natural habitats are subtropical or tropical moist lowland forests and subtropical or tropical moist montane forests. It is threatened by habitat loss.

== Sources ==
- IUCN SSC Amphibian Specialist Group (2016). "Cophyla mavomavo". IUCN Red List of Threatened Species. 2016 e.T57958A84179558. doi:10.2305/IUCN.UK.2016-1.RLTS.T57958A84179558.en.
