= Pristimantis pinguis =

Conservation status
- Endangered (IUCN 3.1)

Scientific classification
- Kingdom: Animalia
- Phylum: Chordata
- Class: Amphibia
- Order: Anura
- Clade: Brachycephaloidea
- Family: Craugastoridae
- Genus: Pristimantis
- Species: P. pinguis

Binomial name
- Pristimantis pinguis (Duellman & Pramuk, 1999)

Synonyms
- Eleutherodactylus pinguis Duellman & Pramuk, 1999

Species of frog

Photo of the Pristimantis pinguis

Pristimantis pinguis is a species of frog in the family Strabomantidae. It is endemic to Peru where it is known from the region of its type locality in the Celendín Province as well as from the western slopes of the Cordillera Occidental in the Cajamarca Region. Its natural habitat is tropical high-altitude grassland at elevations of 3,000–3,916 m (9,843–12,848 ft) asl. This little-known species is potentially threatened by habitat loss caused by agricultural development.
