= Pristimantis ardalonychus =

Conservation status
- Endangered (IUCN 3.1)

Scientific classification
- Kingdom: Animalia
- Phylum: Chordata
- Class: Amphibia
- Order: Anura
- Clade: Brachycephaloidea
- Family: Craugastoridae
- Genus: Pristimantis
- Species: P. ardalonychus

Binomial name
- Pristimantis ardalonychus (Duellman & Pramuk, 1999)

Synonyms
- Eleutherodactylus ardalonychus Duellman & Pramuk, 1999

Species of amphibian

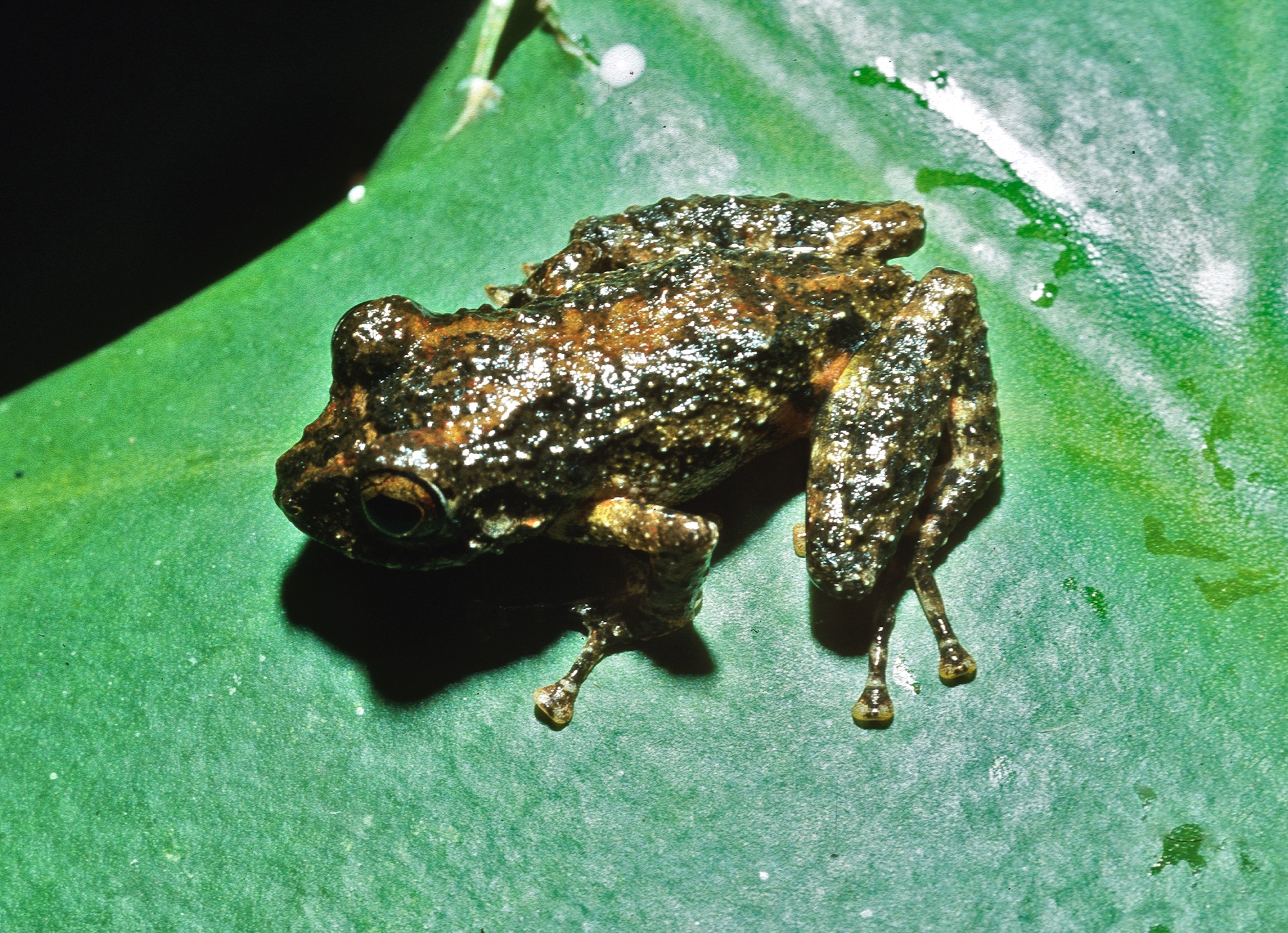
Pristimantis ardalonychus

Pristimantis ardalonychus is a species of frog in the family Strabomantidae. It is endemic to Peru where it is only known from the region of its type locality near Rioja, Rioja Province, in the San Martín Region of northern central Peru. Its natural habitats are lower humid montane forests. It is threatened by habitat loss.
