= Paramo robber frog =

Conservation status
- Endangered (IUCN 3.1)

Scientific classification
- Kingdom: Animalia
- Phylum: Chordata
- Class: Amphibia
- Order: Anura
- Clade: Brachycephaloidea
- Family: Craugastoridae
- Genus: Pristimantis
- Species: P. paramerus

Binomial name
- Pristimantis paramerus (Rivero, 1984)

Synonyms
- Eleutherodactylus paramerus Rivero, 1984 "1982"

Species of amphibian

The paramo robber frog (Pristimantis paramerus) is a species of frog in the family Strabomantidae.

It is endemic to Venezuela. Its natural habitat is tropical high-altitude grassland. It is threatened by habitat loss.

== Sources ==
- ARKive Images of Life on Earth: Paramo Robber Frog
- Craugastoridae - Neotropical Frogs: It includes the Paramo Robber Frog
- Venezuela Endemic Amphibians Checklist: It includes the Paramo Robber Frog
