= Atelopus exiguus =

Conservation status
- Endangered (IUCN 3.1)

Scientific classification
- Kingdom: Animalia
- Phylum: Chordata
- Class: Amphibia
- Order: Anura
- Family: Bufonidae
- Genus: Atelopus
- Species: A. exiguus

Binomial name
- Atelopus exiguus (Boettger, 1892)
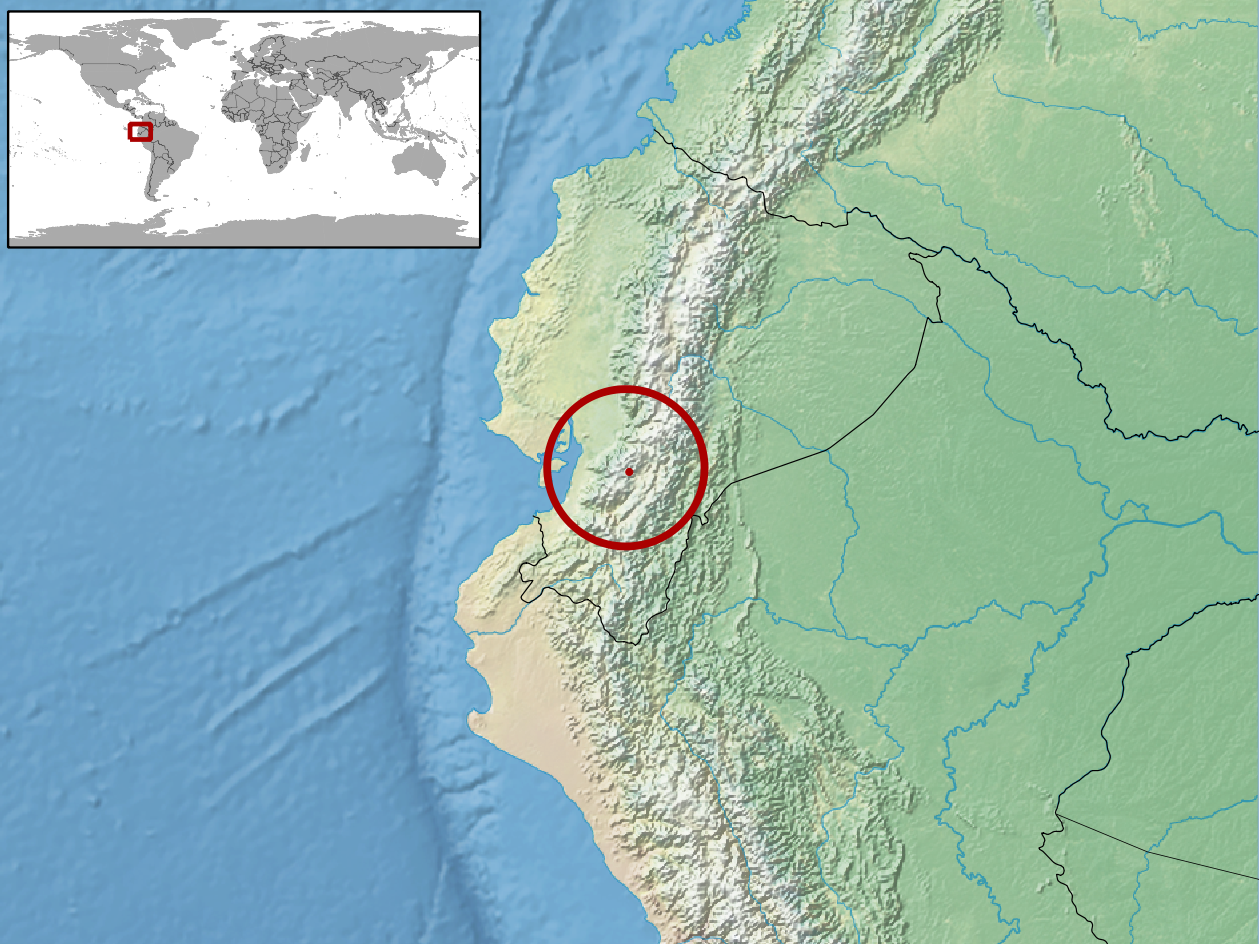

Synonyms
- Phryniscus laevis var. exigua Boettger, 1892; Atelopus ignescens exigua — Rivero, 1963

Species of amphibian

Atelopus exiguus is a species of toad in the family Bufonidae. It is endemic to Ecuador and only known from the area of its type locality in the Azuay Province of southern Ecuador, in the sub-páramo and páramo of Cordillera Occidental. Common name Mazán jambato frog has been proposed for it.

== Description ==
Adult males measure 21–27 mm (0.83–1.06 in) and females 29–35 mm (1.1–1.4 in) in snout–vent length. The body robust with short and thick legs. The snout is acuminate. The dorsum and flanks are bright yellowish-green to blackish-green, and the venter is yellow to orange. The iris is almost entirely black. The dorsal surfaces have some warts. Tympanum is absent.

== Habitat and conservation ==
Its natural habitats are sub-páramo and páramo at elevations of 3,000–4,000 m (9,800–13,100 ft) above sea level, although it has also been recorded in pastureland. This formerly abundant species is believed to have declined. Both habitat loss (from agriculture, dams, or climate change), chytridiomycosis, and invasive trout are threats. The species occurs in the Cajas National Park and Mazán Protected Forest.
