= Pristimantis baryecuus =

Conservation status
- Endangered (IUCN 3.1)

Scientific classification
- Kingdom: Animalia
- Phylum: Chordata
- Class: Amphibia
- Order: Anura
- Clade: Brachycephaloidea
- Family: Craugastoridae
- Genus: Pristimantis
- Species: P. baryecuus

Binomial name
- Pristimantis baryecuus (Lynch, 1979)

Synonyms
- Eleutherodactylus baryecuus Lynch, 1979

Species of frog

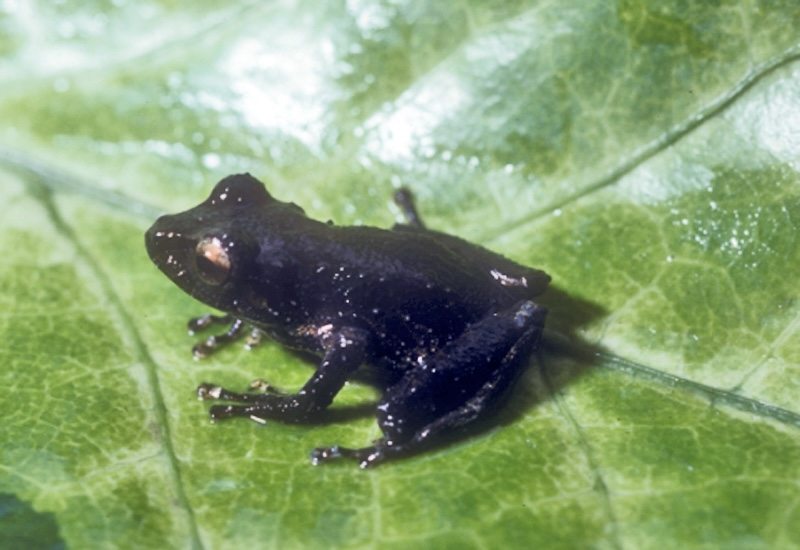
Pristimantis baryecuus

Pristimantis baryecuus is a species of frog in the family Strabomantidae. It is endemic to Ecuador. Its natural habitats are tropical moist montane forests, high-altitude shrubland, and heavily degraded former forest. It is threatened by habitat loss.
