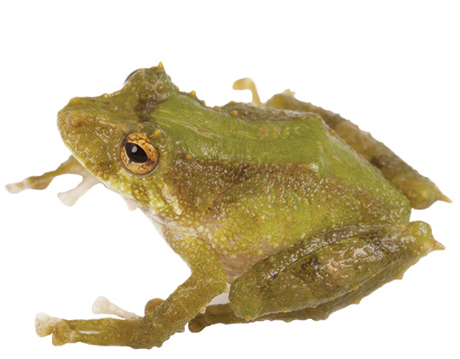

Conservation status
- Endangered (IUCN 3.1)

Scientific classification
- Kingdom: Animalia
- Phylum: Chordata
- Class: Amphibia
- Order: Anura
- Family: Strabomantidae
- Genus: Pristimantis
- Subgenus: Pristimantis
- Species: P. inusitatus

Binomial name
- Pristimantis inusitatus (Lynch and Duellman, 1980)

Synonyms
- Eleutherodactylus inusitatus Lynch and Duellman, 1980

= Pristimantis inusitatus =

Species of frog

Pristimantis inusitatus is a species of frog in the family Strabomantidae. It is endemic to Ecuador and known from scattered localities along the eastern slopes of the Andes. Common name barking robber frog has been coined for it.

== Etymology ==
The specific name inusitatus is derived from Latin in- (=negation) and usitatus (="usual" or "common"), meaning "rare or uncommon". The species was described based on three specimens collected from three separate locations.

== Description ==
Males measure 15–23 mm (0.59–0.91 in) and females 17–26 mm (0.67–1.02 in) in snout–vent length. The snout is subacuminate in dorsal view and protruding in lateral profile and has a pointed tip. The canthus rostralis is sharp. The tympanum is prominent. Both fingers and toes bear broad discs and have lateral fringes. Dorsal skin is shagreened or smooth; there are large warts laterally. Females are dorsally green. Male coloration varies from green to pinkish brown with dark brown markings. The limbs have faint brown bars. The venter is white.

== Habitat and conservation ==
Its natural habitat is cloud forest at elevations of 1,300–2,160 m (4,270–7,090 ft) above sea level. It occurs in low vegetation near streams. It is threatened by habitat loss caused by agriculture, logging, and human settlement.
