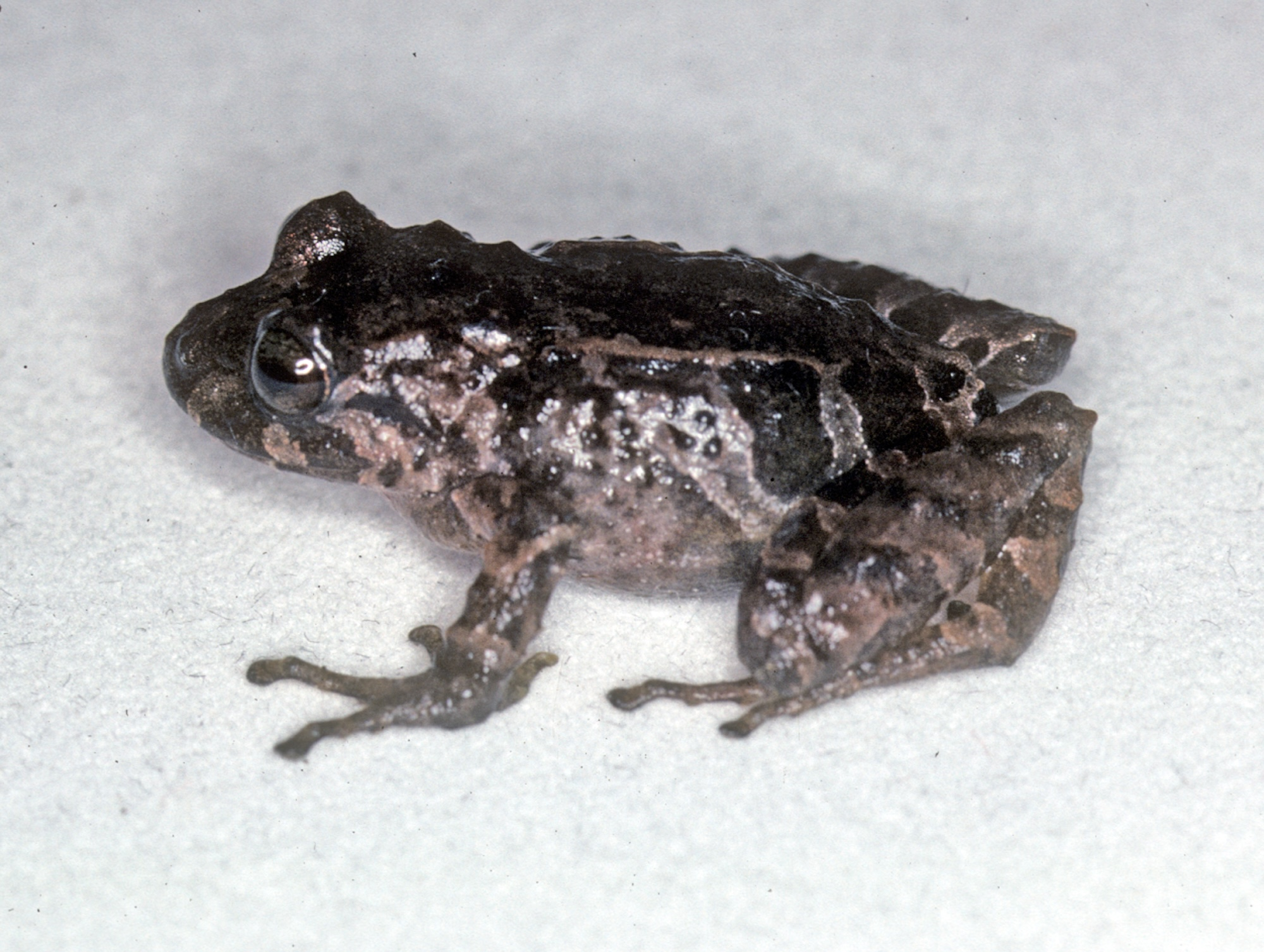

Conservation status
- Endangered (IUCN 3.1)

Scientific classification
- Kingdom: Animalia
- Phylum: Chordata
- Class: Amphibia
- Order: Anura
- Clade: Brachycephaloidea
- Family: Craugastoridae
- Genus: Pristimantis
- Species: P. capitonis

Binomial name
- Pristimantis capitonis (Lynch, 1998)

Synonyms
- Eleutherodactylus capitonis Lynch, 1998

= Pristimantis capitonis =

Species of frog

Pristimantis capitonis is a species of frog in the family Strabomantidae, endemic to Colombia. As its natural habitat is tropical moist montane forests, it is threatened by habitat loss.
