= Leptodactylus watu =

Conservation status
- Endangered (IUCN 3.1)

Scientific classification
- Kingdom: Animalia
- Phylum: Chordata
- Class: Amphibia
- Order: Anura
- Family: Leptodactylidae
- Genus: Leptodactylus
- Species: L. watu

Binomial name
- Leptodactylus watu Alves da Silva, Magalhães, Thomassen, Leite, Garda, Brandão, Haddad, Giaretta, and Carvalho, 2020

Species of frog

Leptodactylus watu is a species of frog in the family Leptodactylidae. It is endemic to Brazil.

== Habitat ==
Scientists see the frog on the leaf litter in primary and secondary forest. This frog has not been reported in open or grassy areas or on tree farms that raise non-native species. Scientists have reported the frog between 200 and 500 meters above sea level.

Scientists have observed the frog in one protected park: Parque Estadual Do Rio Doce.

== Reproduction ==
The male frog sits under vegetation, on the leaf litter, or underground and calls to the female frogs. The frog builds a foam nest in a burrow for its eggs. When the rain falls, the tadpoles are washed into permanent or temporary pools of water, where they complete their development.

== Threats ==
The IUCN classifies this species as endangered. It is threatened by longstanding habitat loss. Human beings convert the forest to agriculture, silviculture, and pasturage and set fires for this purpose. The forests that remain are heavily fragmented.

== Original description ==
- Da Silva LA; FM Magalhães; H Thomassen; FSF Leite; AA Garda; RA Brandão; CFB Haddad; AA Giaretta; TR de Carvalho (2020). "Unraveling the species diversity and relationships in the Leptodactylus mystaceus complex (Anura: Leptodactylidae), with the description of three new Brazilian species". Zootaxa (Abstract). 4779: 151–189. doi:10.11646/zootaxa.4779.2.1. hdl:11449/200443. PMID 33055785.
