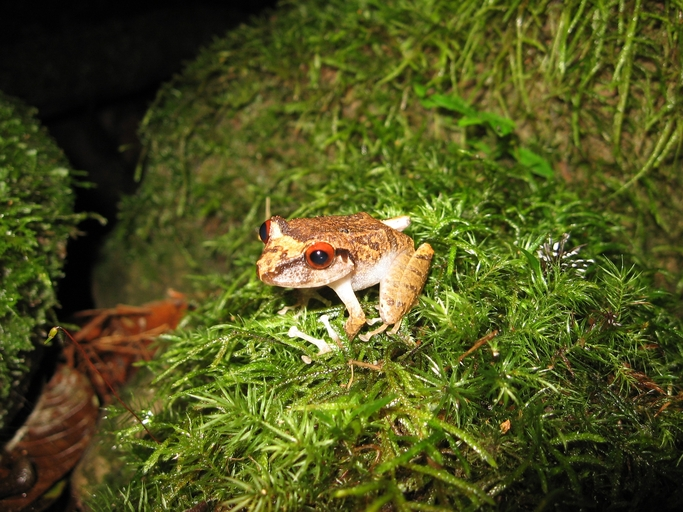

Conservation status
- Endangered (IUCN 3.1)

Scientific classification
- Kingdom: Animalia
- Phylum: Chordata
- Class: Amphibia
- Order: Anura
- Family: Strabomantidae
- Genus: Pristimantis
- Subgenus: Pristimantis
- Species: P. bacchus

Binomial name
- Pristimantis bacchus (Lynch, 1984)

Synonyms
- Eleutherodactylus bacchus Lynch, 1984

= Pristimantis bacchus =

Species of amphibian

Pristimantis bacchus is a species of frog in the family Strabomantidae. It is endemic to the western slopes of the Cordillera Oriental in the Santander Department, Colombia. In a loose reference to its blood-red eyes, this species is named for the Roman God of Wine. Common name wine robber frog has been coined for it.

== Description ==
Adult males measure 22–29 mm (0.9–1.1 in) and adult females 32–35 mm (1.3–1.4 in) in snout–vent length. The head is as wide as the body and wider than it is long. The snout is subacuminate in dorsal view but rounded in profile. The canthus rostralis is sharp. The tympanum is partly obscured by the prominent supratympanic fold. The fingers have lateral keels and terminal pads (those of the outer fingers enlarged). The toes bear slight fringes and terminal pads that are smaller than the larger figner pads; no webbing is present. Skin is smooth. Dorsal coloration is rust brown with dull yellow flecks and only faint dorsolateral stripes. There is a black canthal–supratympanic stripe that is bordered below by dark brown. Lips have pale flecks. The iris is blood red with black flecks or reticulation and a black horizontal streak. The venter is whitish with dark brown flecks. Males have a subgular vocal sac.

== Habitat and conservation ==
Pristimantis bacchus inhabits tropical cloud forests at elevations of 1,450–2,300 m (4,760–7,550 ft) above sea level. However, it can also be found at forest edges and shrubs in pastures. It occurs on the undergrowth vegetation. Development is direct (i.e., there is no free-living larval stage). It can be locally common and the population is probably stable. However, habitat loss caused by agriculture and cattle ranching is a major threat. It is present in the Santuario de Fauna y Flora Guanentá Alto Río Fonce.
