= Pristimantis degener =

Conservation status
- Endangered (IUCN 3.1)

Scientific classification
- Kingdom: Animalia
- Phylum: Chordata
- Class: Amphibia
- Order: Anura
- Clade: Brachycephaloidea
- Family: Craugastoridae
- Genus: Pristimantis
- Species: P. degener

Binomial name
- Pristimantis degener (Lynch & Duellman, 1997)

Synonyms
- Eleutherodactylus degener Lynch & Duellman, 1997

Species of frog

Pristimantis degener is a species of frogs in the family Strabomantidae.

It is found in Colombia and Ecuador. Its natural habitats are tropical moist lowland forests and moist montane forests. It is threatened by habitat loss.
