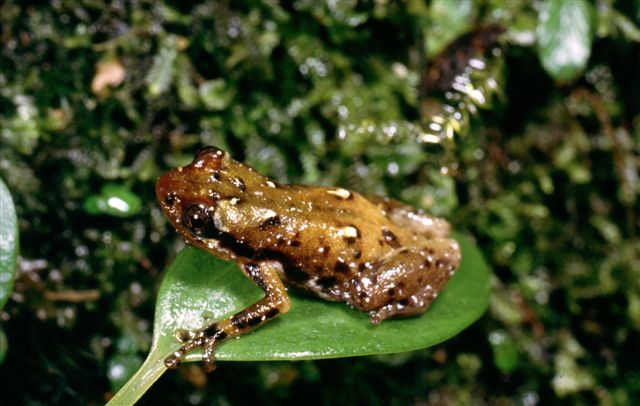

Conservation status
- Endangered (IUCN 3.1)

Scientific classification
- Kingdom: Animalia
- Phylum: Chordata
- Class: Amphibia
- Order: Anura
- Family: Microhylidae
- Subfamily: Cophylinae
- Genus: Platypelis
- Species: P. tetra

Binomial name
- Platypelis tetra Andreone, Fenolio & Walvoord, 2003

= Platypelis tetra =

Species of frog

Platypelis tetra is a species of frog in the family Microhylidae. It is endemic to Madagascar. Its natural habitats are subtropical or tropical moist lowland forests, subtropical or tropical moist montane forests, and heavily degraded former forest. It is threatened by habitat loss.

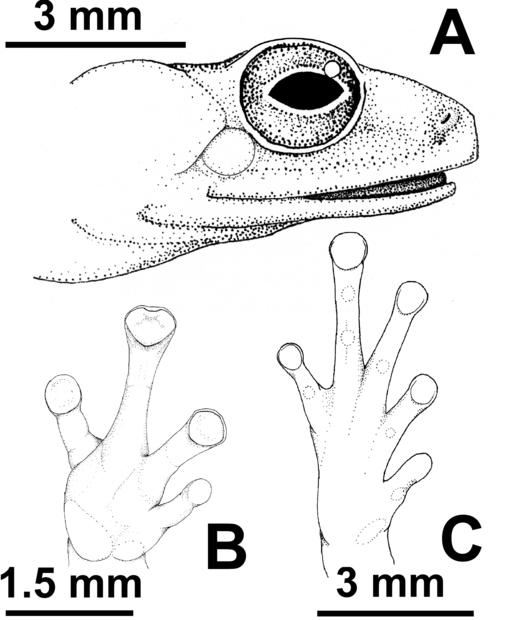
Identification of head, hands, and feet

== Sources ==
- IUCN SSC Amphibian Specialist Group (2016). "Cophyla tetra". IUCN Red List of Threatened Species. 2016 e.T57962A84179970. doi:10.2305/IUCN.UK.2016-1.RLTS.T57962A84179970.en.
