= Pristimantis bellona =

Conservation status
- Endangered (IUCN 3.1)

Scientific classification
- Kingdom: Animalia
- Phylum: Chordata
- Class: Amphibia
- Order: Anura
- Clade: Brachycephaloidea
- Family: Craugastoridae
- Genus: Pristimantis
- Species: P. bellona

Binomial name
- Pristimantis bellona (Lynch, 1992)

Synonyms
- Eleutherodactylus bellona Lynch, 1992

Species of frog

Pristimantis bellona is a species of frog in the family Strabomantidae. It is endemic to Colombia, where it is only known from the region of its type locality in Frontino, Antioquia, on the western slope of the Cordillera Occidental. Its natural habitats are cloud forests and very humid forests where it is usually found on low vegetation and in leaf-litter. While part of its range is within the Las Orquídeas National Natural Park, outside the protected area it is threatened by habitat loss.
