= Quasipaa robertingeri =

Conservation status
- Endangered (IUCN 3.1)

Scientific classification
- Kingdom: Animalia
- Phylum: Chordata
- Class: Amphibia
- Order: Anura
- Family: Dicroglossidae
- Genus: Quasipaa
- Species: Q. robertingeri

Binomial name
- Quasipaa robertingeri (Wu and Zhao, 1995)

Synonyms
- Rana robertingeri Wu and Zhao, 1995; Paa (Paa) robertingeri (Wu and Zhao, 1995); Nanorana robertingeri (Wu and Zhao, 1995)

Species of amphibian

Quasipaa robertingeri is a species of frog in the family Dicroglossidae. It is endemic to Southwest China and is known from southeastern Sichuan, Chongqing, and northern Guizhou. It is named in honor of Robert F. Inger, an American herpetologist and ichthyologist. Common name Hejiang spiny frog has been proposed for it.

A 2009 molecular study placed Quasipaa robertingeri in the synonymy of Quasipaa boulengeri, but another study in 2021 restored its species status; its status remains controversial.

In Sichuan, this species inhabits hill streams and surrounding riparian habitat at elevations of 650–1,500 m (2,130–4,920 ft) above sea level. It is threatened by over-harvesting for human consumption.
