= Japreria =

Japreria may be,

- Japreria language
- Hyloscirtus japreria, sp. frog
