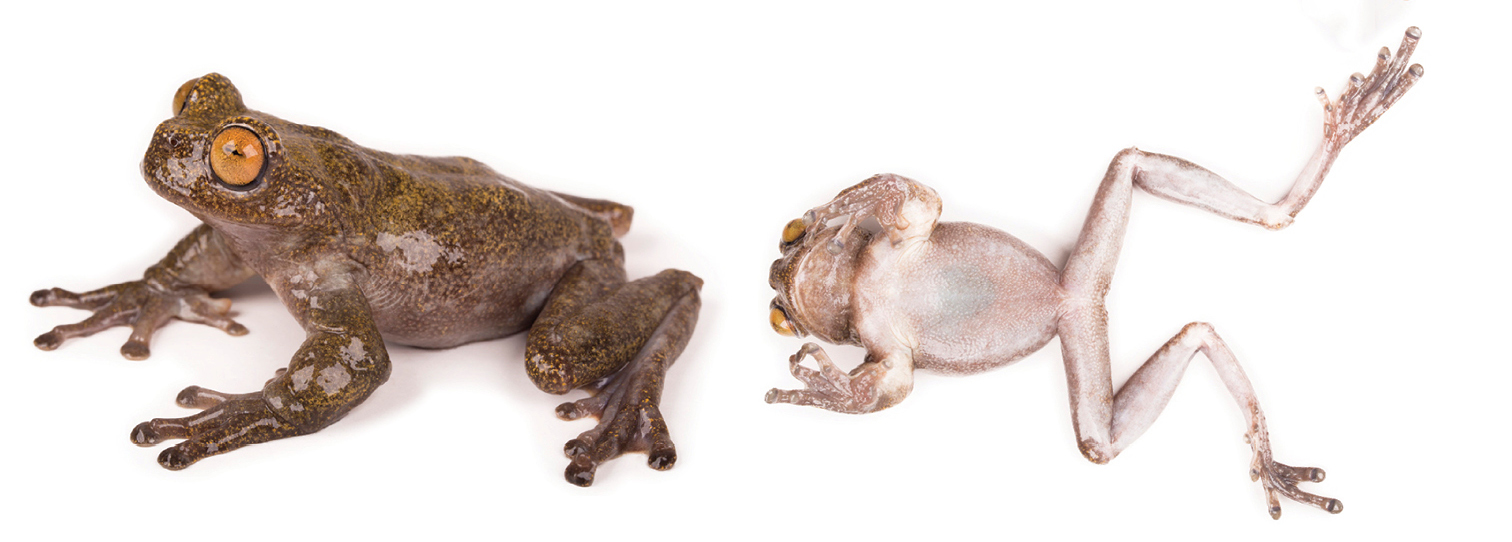
- Hyloscirtus condor

Scientific classification
- Kingdom: Animalia
- Phylum: Chordata
- Class: Amphibia
- Order: Anura
- Family: Hylidae
- Genus: Hyloscirtus
- Species: H. condor

Binomial name
- Hyloscirtus condor Almendariz, Brito, Batallas, Ron 2014

= Hyloscirtus condor =

Species of tree frog

Hyloscirtus condor is a species of tree frog native to Ecuador. Scientists know it exclusively from the type locality in the Reserva Biológica Cerro Plateado. It can be found in elevations of more than 2,300 m (7,500 ft).

== Description ==
The adult male frog measures 64.83–73.83 mm in snout-vent length. Hyloscirtus condor is tan with dark yellow dots around the body. Like Hyloscirtus tapichalaca, the species has a thumb spine. It also has a single, small vocal sac. The iris of the eye is gold in color, with reticulations.

== Entymology ==
The scientists named the frog after the place where the Cordillera del Cóndor, where it was found.

== Original description ==
- Almendariz A; Brito J; Batallas D; Ron S (2014). "Una especie nueva de rana arborea del genero Hyloscirtus (Amphibia: Anura: Hylidae) de la Cordilla del Condor" (PDF). Papéis Avulsos de Zoologia. 54 (4): 33–49. doi:10.1590/0031-1049.2014.54.04.
