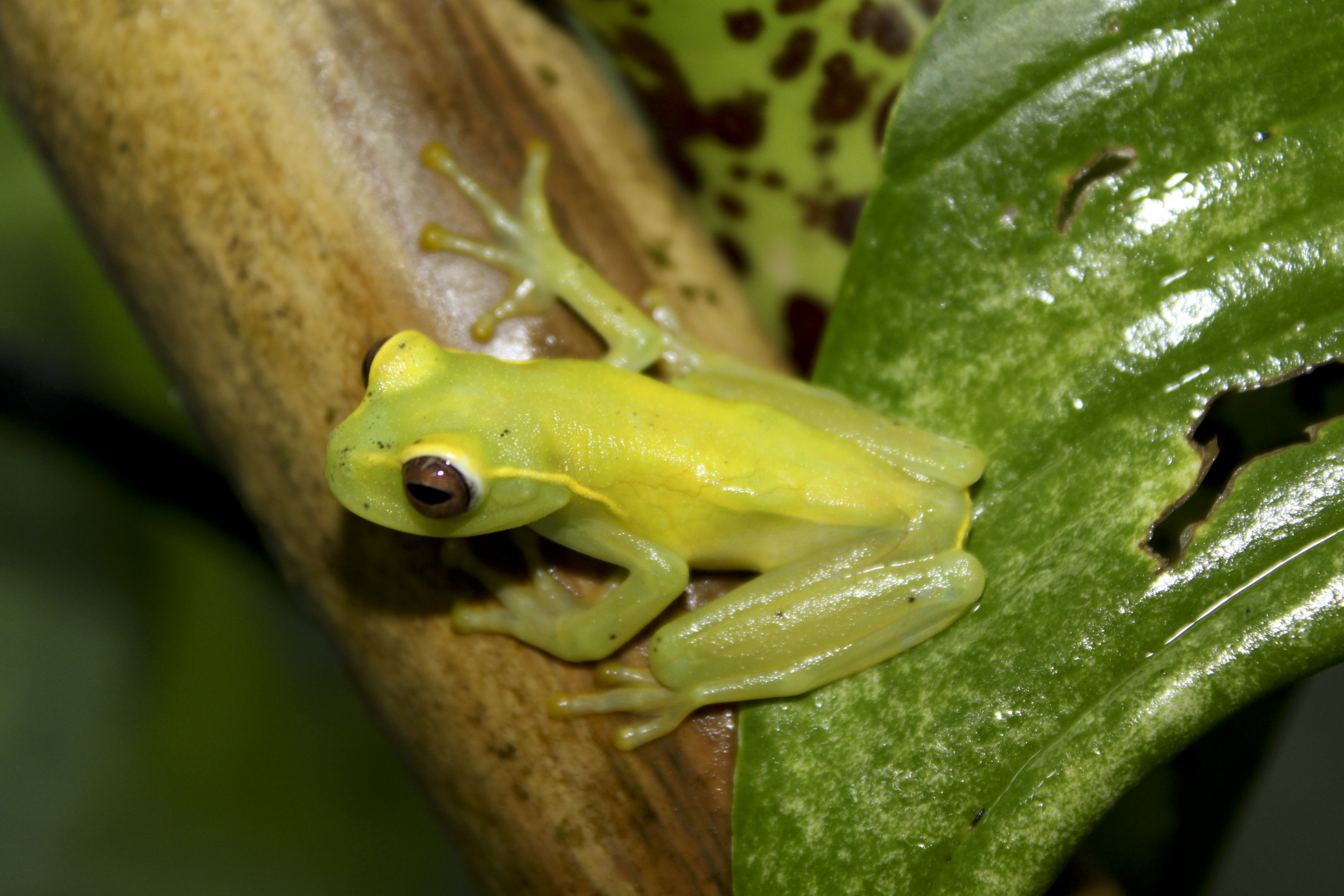

Conservation status
- Endangered (IUCN 3.1)

Scientific classification
- Kingdom: Animalia
- Phylum: Chordata
- Class: Amphibia
- Order: Anura
- Family: Hylidae
- Genus: Hyloscirtus
- Species: H. colymba

Binomial name
- Hyloscirtus colymba (Dunn, 1931)

Synonyms
- Hyla colymba Dunn, 1931; Hyla alvaradoi Taylor, 1952

= La Loma tree frog =

Species of amphibian

The La Loma tree frog (Hyloscirtus colymba) is a species of frog in the family Hylidae found in Costa Rica, Panama, and expected but not confirmed in Colombia. Its natural habitats are tropical moist lowland and montane forests, with breeding taking place in streams. It is threatened by habitat loss and chytridiomycosis.

The common name refers to La Loma, its type locality on the trail between Chiriquí Lagoon and Boquete, in the Bocas del Toro Province of Panama.

== Description ==
This attractive, small, green or brown, stream-breeding frog has a faint orange or creamy eye stripe, with occasional dark flecking and webbed fingers and toes. Adult males are 31–37 mm long, while females can be larger, growing up to 39 mm. Adult males have a creamy colored mental gland on the chin, a pale bluish-green throat and a single gular sac, and no nuptial pads. It can be distinguished morphologically from Hyloscirtus palmeri, which lacks the eye stripe, and from Isthmohyla angustilineata, which has a stripe continuing to the groin area and no finger webbing.

== Larvae ==
Tadpoles are large and bronze colored, with large, irregular gold flecks, and can grow up to 37 mm long, and metamorphs are 17–19 mm. Larvae are well-equipped for grazing, with an inferior oral disc consisting of a beak and 6-7/7-10 denticle rows. They tend to live in fast-flowing streams in rock piles, and are nocturnal.

== Breeding ==
Males make high-pitched cricket-like chirps from beneath rocks and plants near swift-flowing streams, and stop calling at the slightest disturbance, making them very difficult to catch. Field observations from Panama Amphibian Rescue and Conservation Project operations in Cerro Brewster found the males were unusually prominent when sick with chytridiomycosis.

== Conservation ==
Where extant, these frogs are probably more abundant than people realize, because of their highly secretive behavior. However, H. colymba adults have completely disappeared from stream sites in western Panama due to chytridiomycosis. Tadpoles are also susceptible, exhibiting loss of keratinized mouthparts when infected. Because they have now disappeared from much of their western chytridiomycosis-infected range, these frogs were ranked as high priority for ex situ conservation in an amphibian ark assessment. An ex situ assurance colony has been established by the Panama Amphibian Rescue and Conservation Project based in Panama City, where the species was first bred in captivity in 2010.
