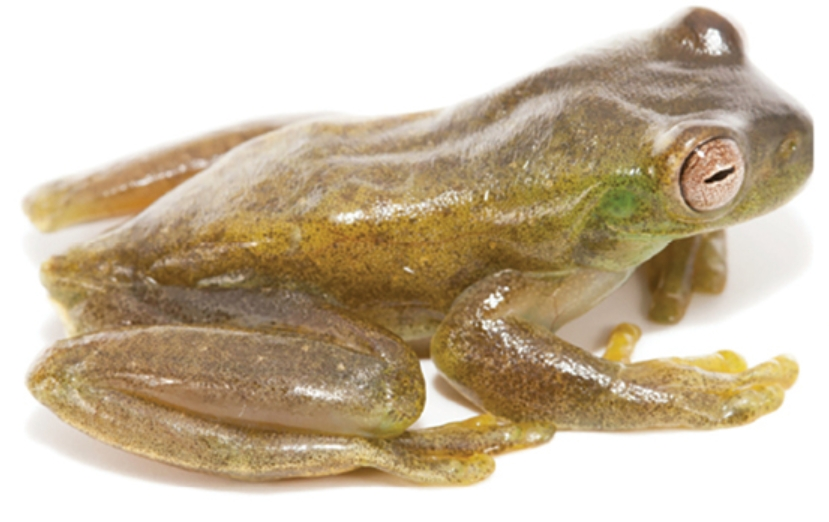

Scientific classification
- Kingdom: Animalia
- Phylum: Chordata
- Class: Amphibia
- Order: Anura
- Family: Hylidae
- Genus: Hyloscirtus
- Species: H. elbakyanae

Binomial name
- Hyloscirtus elbakyanae Varela-Jaramillo, Streicher, Venegas & Ron

= Hyloscirtus elbakyanae =

Species of frog

Hyloscirtus elbakyanae is a species of frog in the family Hylidae. The species is native to the rainforests of Ecuador. It was named after Alexandra Elbakyan in 2025.

== Taxonomy ==
Hyloscirtus elbakyanae was first described in 2025, alongside Hyloscirtus dispersus and Hyloscirtus maycu.

The holotype is an adult male, which was collected in Ecuador's Morona-Santiago Province in 2012. It has been registered at elevations of 214–622 metres (702–2,041 ft).

The species is known only from the male.

== Distribution ==
Hyloscirtus elbakyanae is native to tropical hillside forests and eastern in the Ecuadorian region of the Amazon rainforest. It is found in 11 square kilometres (4.2 sq mi) of rainforest, though there may be undiscovered populations.

== Description ==
Hyloscirtus elbakyanae has an average snout-to-vent length of 3.63 centimetres (1.43 in). Males of the species are larger than the males of Hyloscirtus albopunctulatus and Hyloscirtus maycu.

H. elbakyanae is olive, brownish, or greyish green, and may have white flecks and black spots. The underside, armpits, and groin are silver or brown in colour. The tympanum is round and inconspicuous. The species has conspicuous subarticular tubercles on its hands and feet.

The advertisement call is a single note, repeated in a series of 4-13 calls. The species is nocturnal.

== Etymology ==
Hyloscirtus elbakyanae is named after the computer programmer Alexandra Elbakyan. The researchers noted that her website, Sci-Hub, helped them access relevant literature.

"Elbakyan stream frog" has been proposed as a common name for the species.
