= Western frog =

Western frog may refer to:

- Western banjo frog (Limnodynastes dorsalis), a frog in the family Myobatrachidae endemic to Western Australia
- Western bell frog (Litoria moorei), a frog in the family Hylidae found in Southwest Australia
- Western chorus frog (Pseudacris triseriata), a frog in the family Hylidae found in Canada and the United States
- Western clawed frog (Xenopus tropicalis), a frog in the family Pipidae found in Africa
- Western marsh frog (Heleioporus barycragus), a frog in the family Myobatrachidae endemic to Australia
- Western spotted frog (Heleioporus albopunctatus), a frog in the family Myobatrachidae endemic to Western Australia

== See also ==
- Western tree frog (disambiguation)
