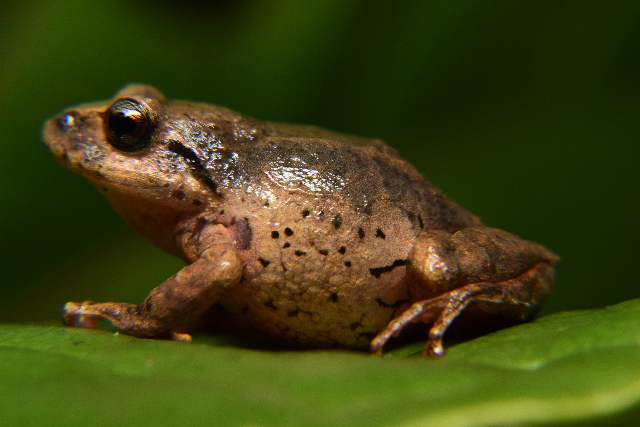

Conservation status
- Least Concern (IUCN 3.1)

Scientific classification
- Kingdom: Animalia
- Phylum: Chordata
- Class: Amphibia
- Order: Anura
- Clade: Brachycephaloidea
- Family: Craugastoridae
- Genus: Pristimantis
- Subgenus: Pristimantis
- Species: P. scopaeus

Binomial name
- Pristimantis scopaeus (Lynch, Ruíz-Carranza, and Ardila-Robayo, 1996)

Synonyms
- Eleutherodactylus scopaeus Lynch, Ruíz-Carranza, and Ardila-Robayo, 1996

= Pristimantis scopaeus =

Species of frog

Pristimantis scopaeus is a species of frog in the family Strabomantidae. It is endemic to Colombia and occurs in the Cordillera Central in the Tolima and Quindío Departments. Pristimantis scopaeus is a dwarf species: adult males in the type series were first mistaken for juveniles of Pristimantis simoteriscus, which itself already is a small species. The specific name scopaeus is Latinization of the Greek skopaios, meaning "dwarf".

== Description ==
Adult males measure 15.3 to 16.7 mm (0.60 to 0.66 in) in snout–vent length. The snout is subacuminate in dorsal view. No tympanum is visible. Skin of the dorsum is nearly smooth. The dorso-lateral folds are ill-defined. The flanks and venter are coarsely areolate. The fingers have lateral keels and small discs as well as ventral pads. The toes have no webbing, lateral keels, nor discs but have ventral pads. In preserved specimens, the dorsum is brown, with most specimens having slightly darker mottling. The canthal–supra-tympanic stripe is dark brown, and labial bar runs just in front of eye. A living specimen was pale brown with black dorso-lateral spots, black heels and elbows, and with dark brown transverse line on thighs and shanks.

== Habitat and conservation ==
Pristimantis scopaeus usually occurs in sub-páramo and páramo habitats at elevations of 3,400–3,680 m (11,200–12,100 ft) above sea level but has also been recorded from pastureland. It is a species that is threatened by habitat loss caused by agriculture activities and cattle grazing, in particular burning of the habitat to facilitate growth of grasses. It is not known to occur in any protected areas.
