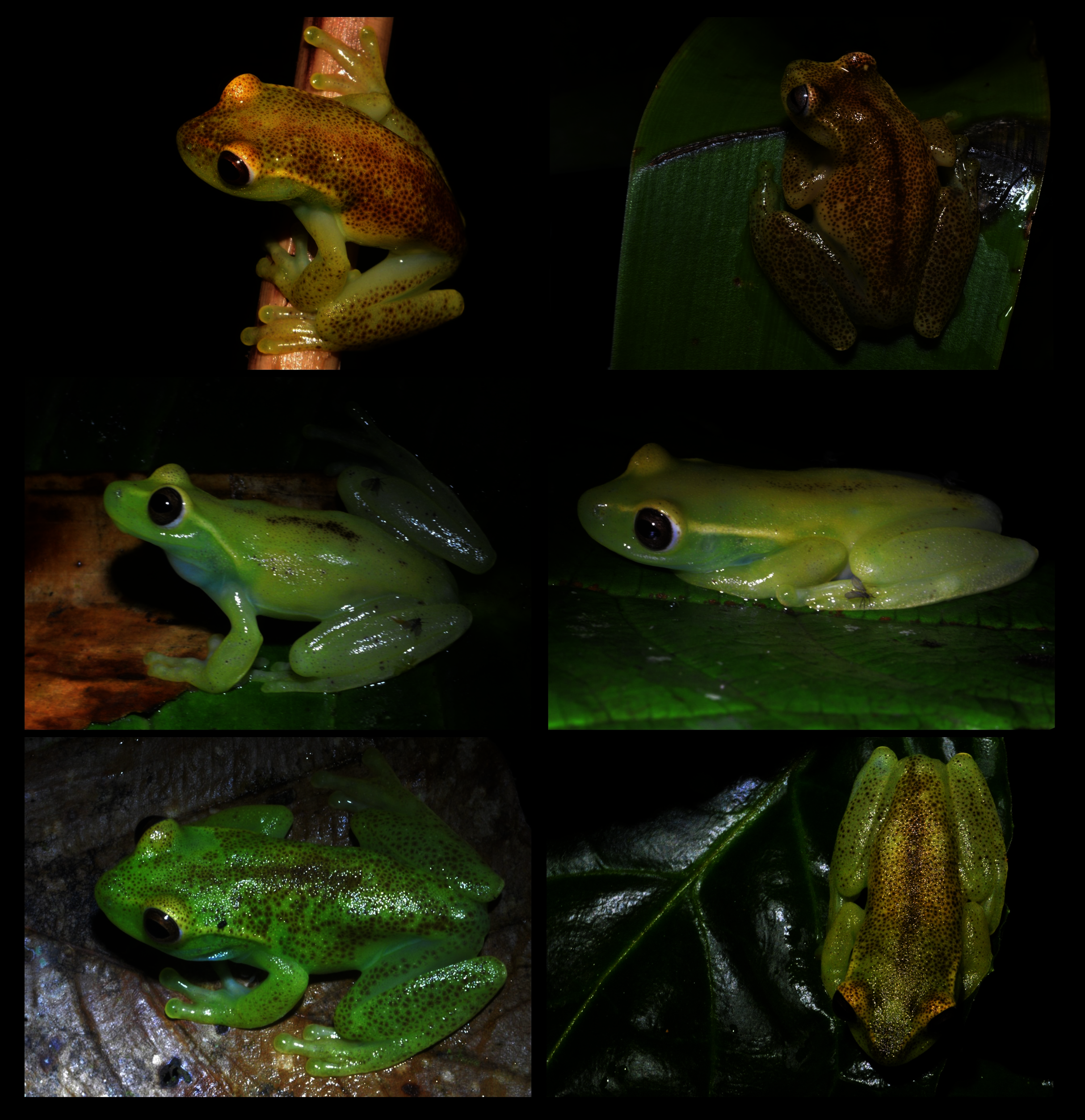

Scientific classification
- Kingdom: Animalia
- Phylum: Chordata
- Class: Amphibia
- Order: Anura
- Family: Hylidae
- Genus: Hyloscirtus
- Species: H. conscientia

Binomial name
- Hyloscirtus conscientia Yánez-Muñoz, Reyes-Puig, Batallas-R., Broaddus, Urgilés-Merchán, Cisneros-Heredia, and Guayasamin, 2021

= Hyloscirtus conscientia =

Species of frog

Hyloscirtus conscientia, the Chical nubulous stream frog, is a species of frog in the family Hylidae. It was described in 2021 and is named after the cloud forests near the small town of El Chical in Ecuador, where the species was found. It is a small, slender species of frog, with adult males having a snout–vent length of 29.6–33.3 mm and adult females having a snout–vent length of 34.7–40 mm. It is known from to localities on the western slopes of the Andes, in Carchi Province at an altitude between 1,495 and 1,750 m. The species inahabits humid montane forest. The known range of the species is only a few kilometers from the Colombian border and the species probably also occurs in Colombia.

== Taxonomy ==
Hyloscirtus conscientia was described in 2021 by the herpetologist Mario Yánez-Muñoz and colleagues based on an adult male specimen collected from Reserva Dracula in the Carchi province of Ecuador. The specific epithet is derived from the imperative Latin "conscĭentĭa". The name was proposed by Carolina Bustillos, a 19-year-old Ecuadorian that participated in a global contest to select the species name. She said that the name emphasized that humans should "have the consciousness" to use less resources and protect the planet.

The suggested English and Spanish common names are Chical nubulous Stream-Frog and Rana nubular torrenticola de Chical, respectively. Both of these names refer to the habitat and location in which the species is found, the cloud forests near the small town of El Chical. The word "nubular" does not exist in either language, but was invented by the 14-year-old Domenique Benítez to describe the species' habitat in a memorable way. It is derived from the Spanish word nubes, meaning 'clouds'.

Within its genus, the species belongs to the H. bogotensis group based on phylogenetic and morphological data.

== Description ==
Hyloscirtus conscientia is a small, slender species of frog, with adult males having a snout–vent length of 29.6–33.3 mm and adult females having a snout–vent length of 34.7–40 mm. It displays a wide range of dorsal color variation, with several patterns. The upper side of the head and body varies from predominantly yellowish white with scattered little brown spots to an extremely pigmented dark brown pattern in a yellowish matrix. Some individuals also exhibit a mid-dorsal line and interorbital lines composed of dense brown melanophores. The intensity and density of these melanophores is highly variable. The supratympanic fold is white or pale light green. A light lemon-green morph has small brown points scattered on the dorsum, with the coloration becoming paler on the flanks and limbs with scattered little brown spots. The underside is predominantly white, except for the limbs, which have whitish-yellow undersides. The iris varies in color from silver to bronze, light brown, or whitish gray with black thin reticulations along the margin of the eye. The frog can probably become darker or lighter, a form of crypsis used for camouflage. Males have a white to light green vocal sac.

=== Vocalizations ===
The species' call consists of a series of five or six notes, with each note having 2–4 pulses. The call is 470–655 ms long. The note duration ranges from 16 to 35 ms, with intervals between notes ranging from 60 to 109 ms, emitted at a rate of 7.69–11.76 notes/second. The dominant frequency ranges from 2.93 to 3.10 kHz.

The calls recorded at the San Juan River subbasin differs from the populations recorded in the Mira River subbasin, suggesting that the populations from the San Juan River may be a distinct species.

== Ecology ==
Tadpoles, metamorphs, and juveniles were found in August, April, and November), suggesting breeding seasons throughout the year. This may be a consequence of the constant high humidity and rainfall in the Chocó bioregion.

== Distribution and habitat ==
Hyloscirtus conscientia is known only from the Dracula Reserve conservation area and the Dracula Youth Reserve. Both reserves are located on the western slopes of the Andes, in Carchi Province at an altitude between 1,495 and 1,750 m. The species is restricted to humid montane forest in the San Juan River drainage, in the Mira basin. The known range of the species is only a few kilometers from the Colombian border; thus, it is likely that H. conscientia is also present in Colombia.

== Status ==
The scientists who discovered the species suggested that it be considered as Data Deficient due to a lack of knowledge about the threats facing the species. The species is known from only two localities, both of which are part of a nature reserve. The area is threatened by mining, cattle ranching, agriculture and deforestation.
