= Hyloscirtus estevesi =

Conservation status
- Data Deficient (IUCN 3.1)

Scientific classification
- Kingdom: Animalia
- Phylum: Chordata
- Class: Amphibia
- Order: Anura
- Family: Hylidae
- Genus: Hyloscirtus
- Species: H. estevesi

Binomial name
- Hyloscirtus estevesi (Rivero, 1968)

Species of frog

Hyloscirtus estevesi is a species of frog in the family Hylidae endemic to Venezuela. Its natural habitats are rivers.
