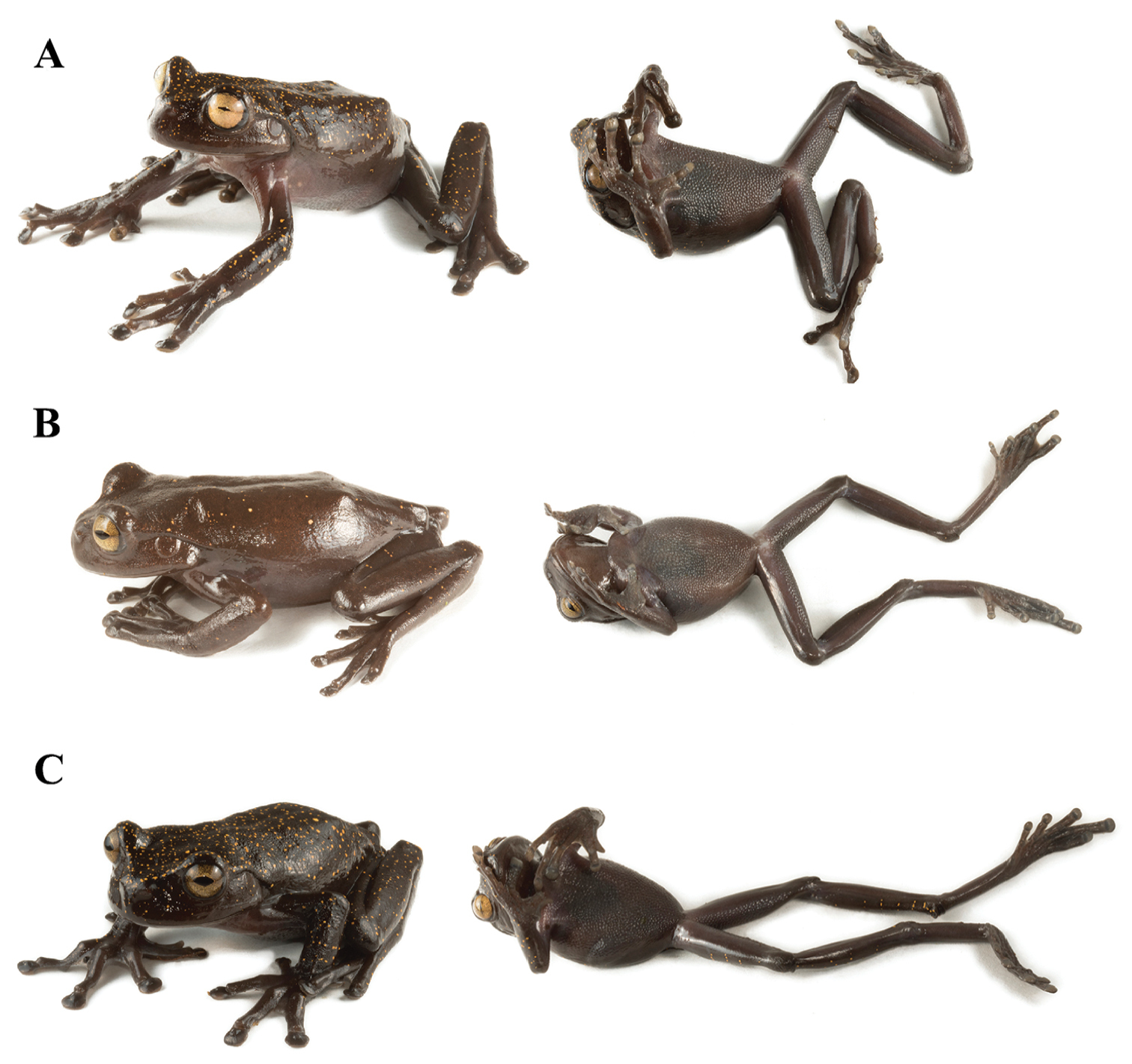

Scientific classification
- Kingdom: Animalia
- Phylum: Chordata
- Class: Amphibia
- Order: Anura
- Family: Hylidae
- Genus: Hyloscirtus
- Species: H. hillisi

Binomial name
- Hyloscirtus hillisi Ron, Caminer, Varela-Jaramillo, and Almeida-Reinoso, 2018

= Hyloscirtus hillisi =

Species of tree frog

Hyloscirtus hillisi is a species of tree frog native to the Cordillera del Cóndor in Ecuador at elevations of 6,532 to 7,001 feet (1,991 to 2,134 m). The species is in danger of extinction.

== Description ==
The adult male frog measures 66.7–72.3 mm in snout-vent length and the adult female frog about 65.8 mm long.

The frog is dark brown with orange flecks across its body. The amount of these flecks vary in number. This allows them to blend in with their environment. They have a claw at the sides of their thumbs. This may allow them to puncture the skin of competitors or predators.

== Habitat ==
This frog lives in forests with many short woody plants about 1.5 m tall. There are trees there too, about 10–15 m tall. Scientists found tadpoles and young frogs in ponds near the river.

== Etymology ==
The species was named after American-Danish biologist, David Hillis.
