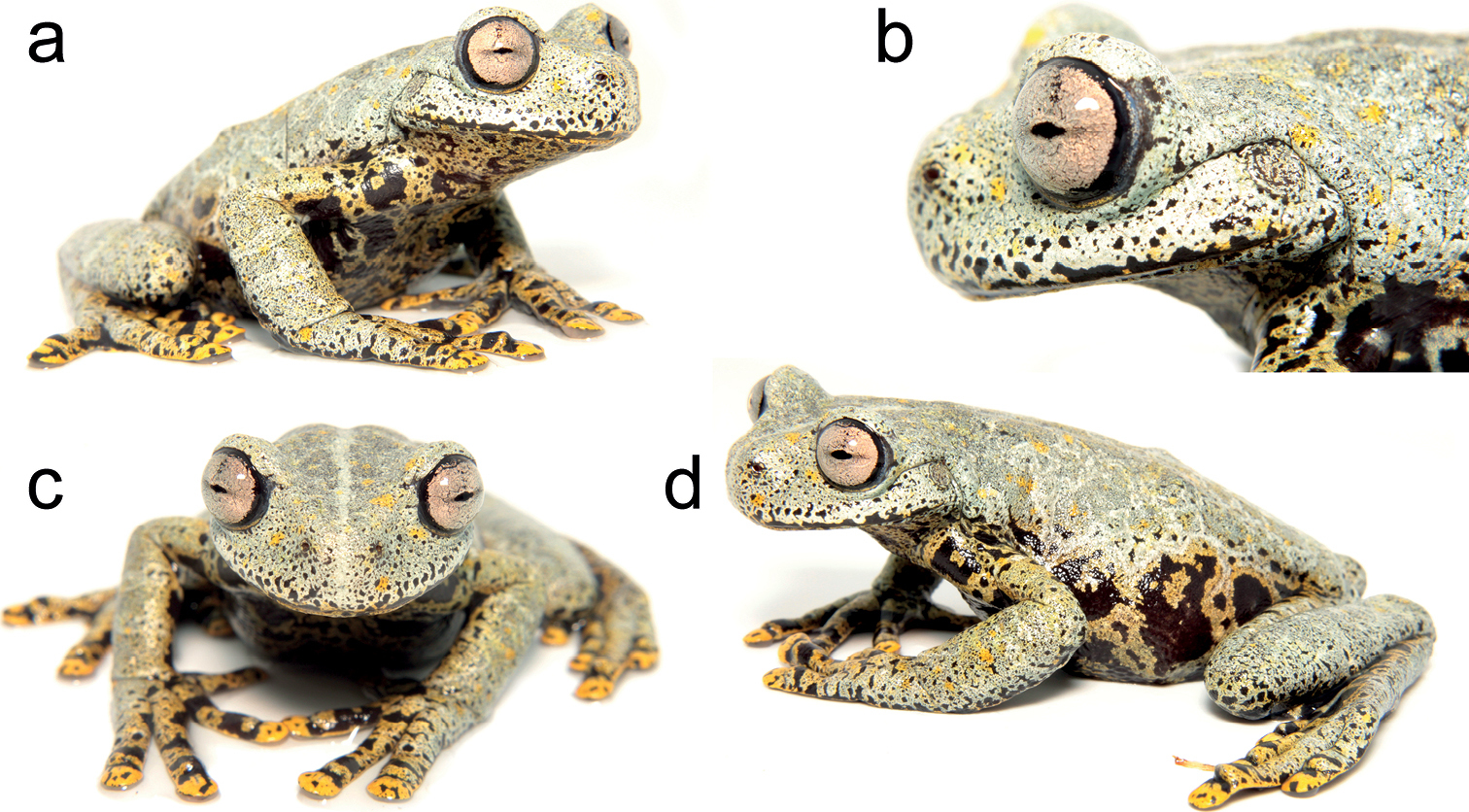

Scientific classification
- Kingdom: Animalia
- Phylum: Chordata
- Class: Amphibia
- Order: Anura
- Family: Hylidae
- Genus: Hyloscirtus
- Species: H. tolkieni

Binomial name
- Hyloscirtus tolkieni Sánchez-Nivicela, Falcón-Reibán, and Cisneros-Heredia, 2023
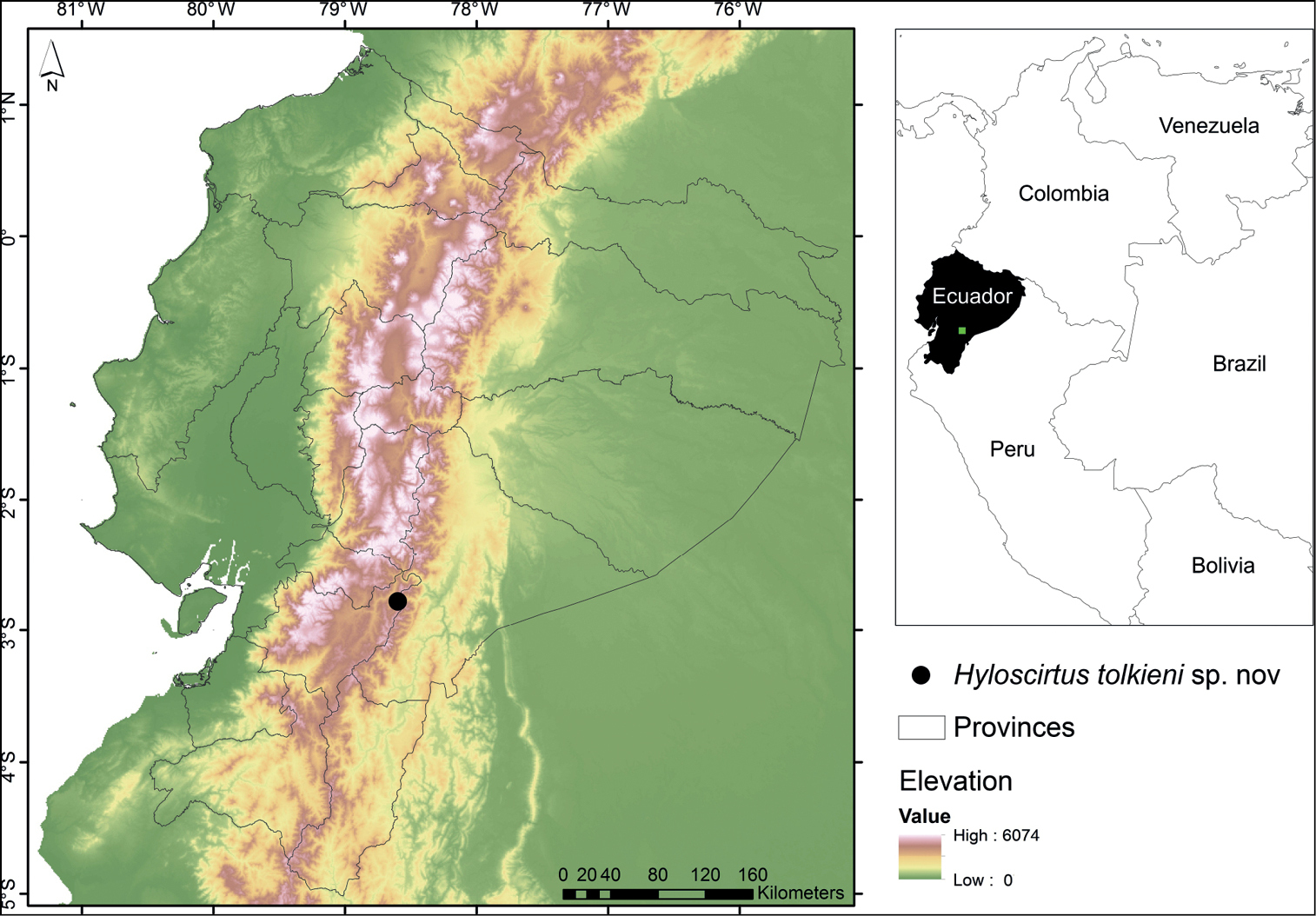
- Map showing the type locality of Hyloscirtus tolkieni at the Río Negro-Sopladora National Park, province of Morona Santiago, Ecuador.

= Hyloscirtus tolkieni =

Species of amphibians

Hyloscirtus tolkieni, commonly known as the Río Negro stream frog, is a recently described (2023) species of frog in the family Hylidae. It is endemic to the Andes Mountains in Ecuador, where it has been observed at 3190 meters above sea level.

The adult female frog measures 64.9 mm in snout-vent length. It is gray-green in color with yellow and black marks. The iris of the eye is pink with a black rim. There are yellow and black spots on the belly and flanks. It has some fringed skin on the front and back toes.

These frogs live in riparian habitats. The tadpoles live in cracks in the rocks underwater, within streams of the Rio Negro-Sopladora National Park. The adult frogs appear nocturnal animals. Scientists have seen them on high tree branches not far from the water.

The scientists who published the first description of this species [Juan C. Sánchez-Nivicela, José M. Falcón-Reibán, and Diego F. Cisneros-Heredia] named this frog after author J.R.R. Tolkien, explaining that they chose the name because "[t]he amazing colours of the new species evoke the magnificent creatures that seem to only exist in fantasy worlds." They paraphrase The Hobbit in the introduction to their paper:

In a stream in the forest there lived a Hyloscirtus. Not a nasty, dirty stream, with spoor of contamination and a muddy smell, nor yet a dry, bare, sandy stream with nothing in it to perch on or to eat: it was a Hyloscirtus-stream, and that means environmental quality.
