= María Cristina Ardila-Robayo =

Colombian herpetologist

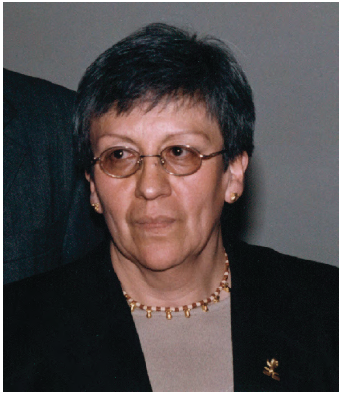
- Born: February 15, 1947
- Died: November 24, 2017 (aged 70)
- Occupation: Zoologist

María Cristina Ardila-Robayo (15 February 1947 – 24 November 2017) was a Colombian herpetologist. She was professor at the National University of Colombia, Bogotá, and worked closely with the Natural History Museum of the university. In 2010 she was credited as having described 28 new species of amphibians from Colombia; as of late 2018, the Amphibian Species of the World lists 31 valid species described by her. She also worked with caimans and crocodiles and lead biodiversity restoration projects.

The following amphibians are named after her:

- Pristimantis cristinae — Cristina's robber frog
- Rhinella cristinae (a beaked toad)
- Nymphargus cristinae (a glass frog)
- Atelopus ardila (a harlequin toad)

== Species described ==
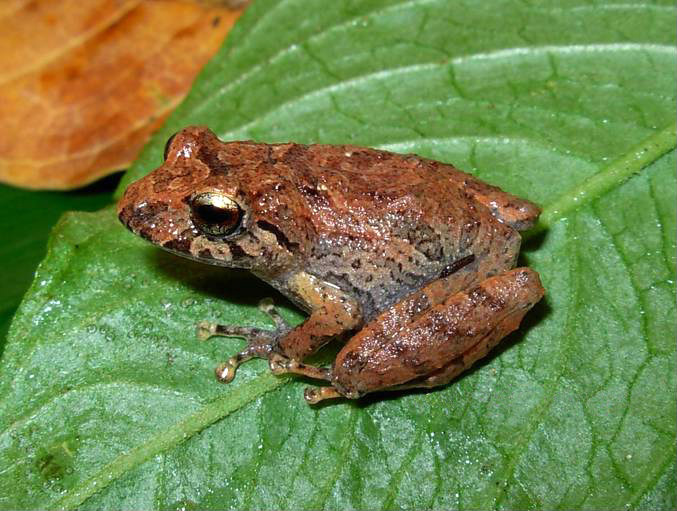
Pristimantis paisa, one of the frogs described by Ardila-Robayo

- Atelopus angelito
- Atelopus guitarraensis
- Atelopus laetissimus
- Atelopus lozanoi
- Atelopus mandingues
- Atelopus minutulus
- Atelopus monohernandezii
- Atelopus nahumae
- Atelopus petriruizi
- Centrolene paezorum
- Colostethus picacho
- Colostethus saltuarius
- Gastrotheca antomia
- Hyloscirtus caucanus
- Hyloscirtus lynchi
- Niceforonia adenobrachia
- Pristimantis aemulatus
- Pristimantis aurantiguttatus
- Pristimantis labiosus
- Pristimantis orpacobates
- Pristimantis paisa
- Pristimantis permixtus
- Pristimantis piceus
- Pristimantis polemistes
- Pristimantis polychrus
- Pristimantis ruedai
- Pristimantis scopaeus
- Pristimantis signifer
- Pristimantis simoteriscus
- Pristimantis viridis
- Pristimantis zophus
