= Atelopus angelito =

Conservation status
- Critically Endangered (IUCN 3.1)

Scientific classification
- Kingdom: Animalia
- Phylum: Chordata
- Class: Amphibia
- Order: Anura
- Family: Bufonidae
- Genus: Atelopus
- Species: A. angelito

Binomial name
- Atelopus angelito Ardila-Robayo & Ruíz-Carranza, 1998

Species of amphibian

Atelopus angelito, the Angelito stubfoot toad, is a species of toads in the family Bufonidae endemic to Colombia. Its natural habitats are subtropical or tropical moist montane forests, subtropical or tropical high-altitude shrubland, and rivers.
