= Atelopus monohernandezii =

Conservation status
- Critically Endangered (IUCN 3.1)

Scientific classification
- Kingdom: Animalia
- Phylum: Chordata
- Class: Amphibia
- Order: Anura
- Family: Bufonidae
- Genus: Atelopus
- Species: A. monohernandezii

Binomial name
- Atelopus monohernandezii Ardila-Robayo, Osorno-Muñoz, and Ruiz-Carranza, 2001

Synonyms
- Atelopus mono-hernandezii [original spelling]

Species of amphibian

Atelopus monohernandezii is a species of toad in the family Bufonidae. It is endemic to Colombia and only known from the vicinity of its type locality on the western slope of the Cordillera Oriental, Santander Department. It has not been observed after 1982 and the remaining population is believed to be very small, if surviving at all.

== Etymology ==
The specific name monohernandezii honours Jorge I. Hernández-Camacho, Colombian zoologist and conservationist nick-named "El Mono" or "El Monito". Common name Hernández's stubfoot toad has been coined for it.

== Description ==
Adult males measure 24–28 mm (0.9–1.1 in) and adult females 35–41 mm (1.4–1.6 in) in snout–vent length. The snout is projecting and acuminate. No tympanum is present. The forearms are robust in males but slender in females. The fingers have some basal webbing. The hind limbs are slender. The toes are webbed. Dorsal skin is smooth but flanks are granulated. The venter is smooth. Dorsal coloration is uniformly light to dark brown. The head has olive or cinnamon-brown spots. The flanks and the belly are reddish brown in females, variables shades of brown in males, occasionally with whitish or cream spots.

== Habitat and conservation ==
Atelopus monohernandezii occurs in humid cloud forests at elevations of 1,700–2,200 m (5,600–7,200 ft) above sea level. Breeding and larval development take place in streams. Specimens in the type series were collected during the day while active on the forest floor and riverbank.

This species was common during surveys in 1979–1982, but it has not been found in later surveys. The remaining population probably contains fewer than 50 individuals. The reasons for the decline are not known, but chytridiomycosis is a likely culprit. The species has been recorded in the Santuario de fauna y flora Guanentá Alto Río Fonce.
