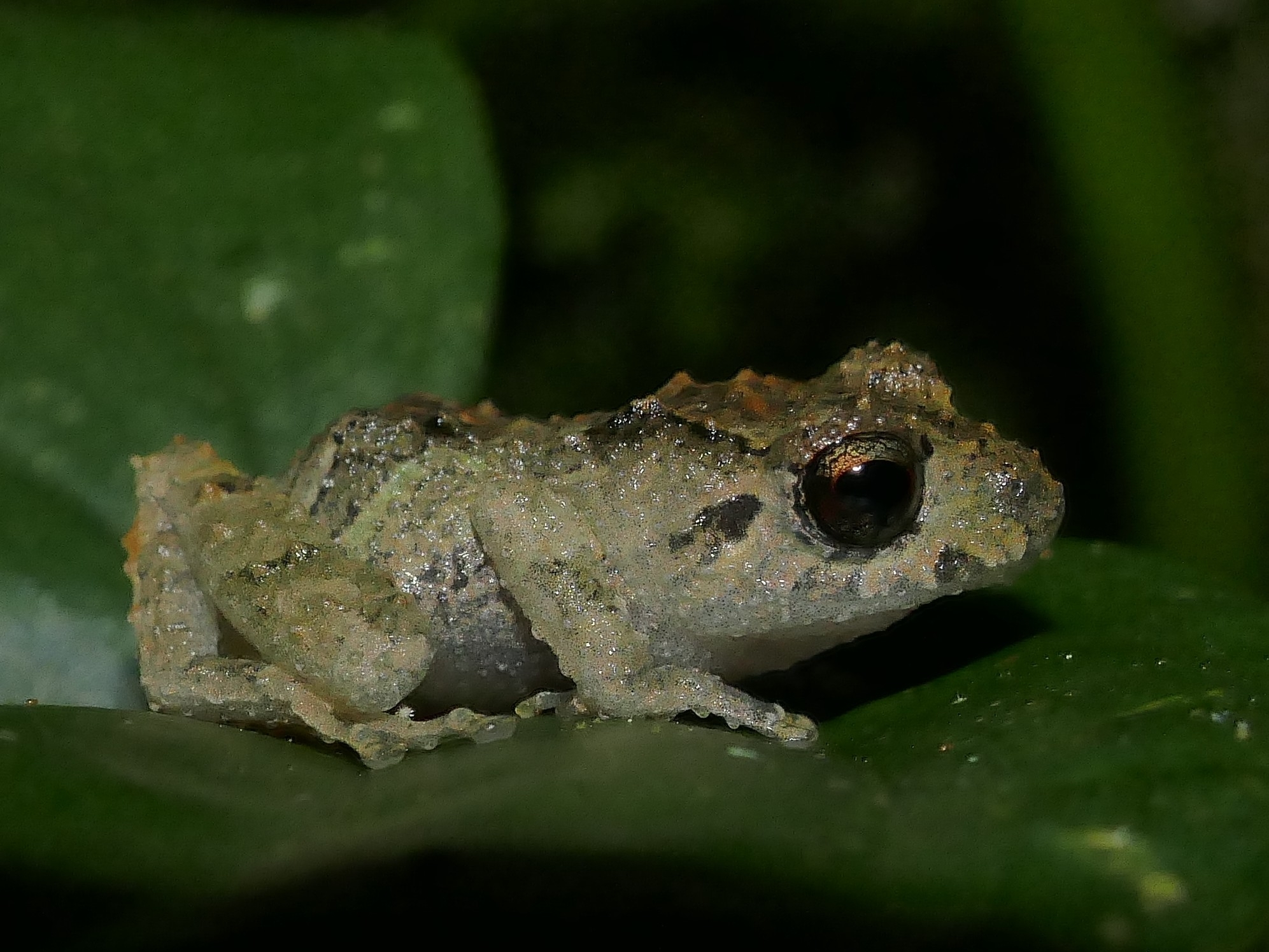

Conservation status
- Near Threatened (IUCN 3.1)

Scientific classification
- Kingdom: Animalia
- Phylum: Chordata
- Class: Amphibia
- Order: Anura
- Clade: Brachycephaloidea
- Family: Craugastoridae
- Genus: Pristimantis
- Subgenus: Pristimantis
- Species: P. zophus

Binomial name
- Pristimantis zophus (Lynch and Ardila-Robayo, 1999)

Synonyms
- Eleutherodactylus zophus Lynch and Ardila-Robayo, 1999

= Pristimantis zophus =

Species of frog

Pristimantis zophus is a species of frog in the family Strabomantidae. It is endemic to Colombia and is only known from the eastern slopes of the northern Cordillera Central in the Antioquia Department. The specific name is derived from Greek zophus, meaning "darkness" or "gloom". It refers to the drab coloration of this frog, as well as its habit of becoming active after the sunset.

== Description ==
Adult males measure 14–17 mm (0.6–0.7 in) and adult females 16–20 mm (0.6–0.8 in) in snout–vent length. The head is as broad as the body in males but narrower in females. The snout is rounded in females, but in males it is subacuminate in the dorsal view. The tympanum is round. The fingers and the toes have discs and lateral keels but no webbing. Skin is smooth. Coloration of most individuals is in shades of brown with darker markings, but the ground color may also be pale cream-grey. The iris is reticulated with black and either very pale green, or pale brassy color above with red horizontal streak and gray below.

== Habitat and conservation ==
Pristimantis zophus occurs along streams inside primary or secondary forest or forest edge at elevations of 2,030–2,800 m (6,660–9,190 ft) above sea level. It can also occur in coffee plantations and along road sides. It is nocturnal and usually encountered perched on very low vegetation, no more than 1 m (3 ft) above the ground. Development is direct, without free-living larval stage.

Pristimantis zophus is common within its relatively small range. It is threatened by agriculture, livestock, mining and the cultivation of illegal crops. It has been recorded in the Distrito de Manejo Integrado Cuchilla Jardin Tamesis, a regional protected area.
