= Pristimantis piceus =

Conservation status
- Least Concern (IUCN 3.1)

Scientific classification
- Kingdom: Animalia
- Phylum: Chordata
- Class: Amphibia
- Order: Anura
- Clade: Brachycephaloidea
- Family: Craugastoridae
- Genus: Pristimantis
- Subgenus: Pristimantis
- Species: P. piceus

Binomial name
- Pristimantis piceus (Lynch, Ruíz-Carranza, and Ardila-Robayo, 1996)

Synonyms
- Eleutherodactylus piceus Lynch, Ruíz-Carranza, and Ardila-Robayo, 1996

Species of frog

Pristimantis piceus is a species of frog in the family Strabomantidae. It is endemic to Colombia and occurs in the Cordillera Central between the Antioquia Department in the north and the Cauca Department in the south. Many specimens are black in color, and the specific name piceus is Latin meaning "pitch-black".

== Description ==
Adult males measure 29–41 mm (1.1–1.6 in) and adult females 40–50 mm (1.6–2.0 in) in snout–vent length. The snout is long, subacuminate in the dorsal view, and rounded in the lateral profile. The tympanum is distinct, but the supra-tympanic fold obscures its upper edge. The skin of the dorsum has numerous minute, low warts. The dorso-lateral fold is not present. The venter is areolate. The fingers have lateral keels and discs. The toes have fleshy keels and discs that are smaller than the finger discs. Coloration is variable, usually uniformly black, reddish-brown, or dark brown with a pale blue peri-ocular ring. Many specimens have orange spots on the flanks. The margin of the mandible usually shows some White flecks. The iris is black, chocolate, or dull bronze, with yellowish flecks. Males have large, sub-gular vocal sac.

When disturbed, these frogs may secrete a white or blue-white mucus. Presumably, this sticky secretion serves defensive purposes.

== Habitat and conservation ==
Pristimantis piceus occur in the cloud forest, sub-páramo, and páramo habitats at elevations of 2,400–3,400 m (7,900–11,200 ft) above sea level. They are at active night when they can be found on vegetation, especially in open areas on top of weeds. During the day, they occur on the ground, among low grass, or under logs and rocks.

It is a relatively widespread and common species that can locally suffer from habitat loss caused by deforestation, agriculture development, and illegal crops. It occurs in several protected areas.
