= Hyloscirtus tigrinus =

Conservation status
- Endangered (IUCN 3.1)

Scientific classification
- Kingdom: Animalia
- Phylum: Chordata
- Class: Amphibia
- Order: Anura
- Family: Hylidae
- Genus: Hyloscirtus
- Species: H. tigrinus

Binomial name
- Hyloscirtus tigrinus Mueses-Cisneros and Anganoy-Criollo, 2008

Synonyms
- Colomascirtus tigrinus (Mueses-Cisneros and Anganoy-Criollo, 2008)

Species of tree frog

Hyloscirtus tigrinus is a species of tree frog native to Colombia and Ecuador. It can be found in elevations of up to 3000 meters up in the Andes Mountains. Scientists have observed the frog sitting on vegetation approximately .5 m above ground level.

== Description ==
Hyloscirtus tigrinus is a medium-sized and robust frog with spots covering various parts of its body. The adult male frog measures about 54.2–60.7 mm in snout-vent length and the adult female frog about 62.9–63.2 mm long. The iris of the eye is gray with black reticulations. The skin of the frog's head, back, and legs is yellow-green with black stripes or bars that extend down toward the belly, similar to tiger stripes. There are also orange spots on some parts of the body. The bottoms of the feet can be gray in color, and parts of the climbing disks are black. This frog's distinctive color pattern allows it to be distinguished from other Hyloscirtus species. This is also how the species was named, having a similar pattern to that of the tiger.

The advertisement call of Hyloscirtus tigrinus is a low, pulsed sound made about 38 to 48 times per minute, with a tone ranging between 1,636 and 1,894 hertz. This call was first described by Liévano-Bonilla and colleagues in 2025 and helps the frog communicate over the loud noise of mountain streams.
