= Jahn's tree frog =

Conservation status
- Vulnerable (IUCN 3.1)

Scientific classification
- Kingdom: Animalia
- Phylum: Chordata
- Class: Amphibia
- Order: Anura
- Family: Hylidae
- Genus: Hyloscirtus
- Species: H. jahni

Binomial name
- Hyloscirtus jahni (Rivero, 1961)

Species of amphibian

Jahn's tree frog (Hyloscirtus jahni) is a species of frogs in the family Hylidae endemic to Venezuela. Its natural habitats are subtropical or tropical moist montane forests and rivers. It is threatened by habitat loss.
