= Hyloscirtus alytolylax =

Conservation status
- Least Concern (IUCN 3.1)

Scientific classification
- Kingdom: Animalia
- Phylum: Chordata
- Class: Amphibia
- Order: Anura
- Family: Hylidae
- Genus: Hyloscirtus
- Species: H. alytolylax

Binomial name
- Hyloscirtus alytolylax (Duellman, 1972)

Synonyms
- Hyla alytolylax Duellman, 1972; Hyloscirtus alytolylax Faivovich, Haddad, Garcia, Frost, Campbell, and Wheeler, 2005; Boana alytolylax Wiens, Fetzner, Parkinson, and Reeder, 2005

Species of frog

Hyloscirtus alytolylax, called the babbling stream frog, babbling torrenter, or tadapi tree frog in English, is a species of frog in the family Hylidae found in Colombia and Ecuador. Its natural habitats are subtropical or tropical moist lowland forests, subtropical or tropical moist montane forests, and rivers. It is threatened by habitat loss. Scientists have observed it in Colombia between 500 and 2159 meters above sea level and in Ecuador between 400 and 2000 meters above sea level.

The adult male frog measures 32.1–37.0 mm in snout-vent length and the adult female frog 37.2–43.9 mm. The skin of the dorsum is brown-green, yellow-green, gray-green, or light green in color with yellow stripes.

This frog is nocturnal. Adult frogs sit on plants 0.5 to 4.0 meters above the ground. Tadpoles and young frogs live in and near streams with fast-moving current.

The frog's scientific name comes from the Greek alytos for "continuing" and lylax for "talks very much." This is because of the frog's call.
