= Rio Luisito tree frog =

Conservation status
- Endangered (IUCN 3.1)

Scientific classification
- Kingdom: Animalia
- Phylum: Chordata
- Class: Amphibia
- Order: Anura
- Family: Hylidae
- Genus: Hyloscirtus
- Species: H. piceigularis

Binomial name
- Hyloscirtus piceigularis (Ruíz-Carranza & Lynch, 1982)

Species of amphibian

The Rio Luisito tree frog (Hyloscirtus piceigularis) is a species of frog in the family Hylidae endemic to Colombia. Its natural habitats are subtropical or tropical moist montane forests and rivers. It has been observed between 1750 and 2000 meters above sea level. It is threatened by habitat loss.
