= Atelopus guitarraensis =

Conservation status
- Data Deficient (IUCN 3.1)

Scientific classification
- Kingdom: Animalia
- Phylum: Chordata
- Class: Amphibia
- Order: Anura
- Family: Bufonidae
- Genus: Atelopus
- Species: A. guitarraensis

Binomial name
- Atelopus guitarraensis Osorno Muñoz, Ardila-Robayo & Ruíz-Carranza, 2001

Species of amphibian

Atelopus guitarraensis, the La Guitarra stubfoot toad, is a species of toads in the family Bufonidae endemic to Colombia. Its natural habitats are subtropical or tropical high-altitude grassland and rivers. It is threatened by habitat loss.
