= Tabor tree frog =

Conservation status
- Least Concern (IUCN 3.1)

Scientific classification
- Kingdom: Animalia
- Phylum: Chordata
- Class: Amphibia
- Order: Anura
- Family: Hylidae
- Genus: Hyloscirtus
- Species: H. lascinius

Binomial name
- Hyloscirtus lascinius (Rivero, 1969)

Species of amphibian

The Tabor tree frog (Hyloscirtus lascinius) is a species of frog in the family Hylidae found in Colombia and Venezuela. Its natural habitats are subtropical or tropical moist montane forests, rivers, rural gardens, and heavily degraded former forests.
