= Atelopus petriruizi =

Conservation status
- Critically Endangered (IUCN 3.1)

Scientific classification
- Kingdom: Animalia
- Phylum: Chordata
- Class: Amphibia
- Order: Anura
- Family: Bufonidae
- Genus: Atelopus
- Species: A. petriruizi

Binomial name
- Atelopus petriruizi Ardila-Robayo, 1999

Species of amphibian

Atelopus petriruizi is a species of toad in the family Bufonidae. Endemic to Colombia, the toad's natural habitats are subtropical or tropical moist montane forests and rivers. Threatened by habitat loss, Ateopus petriruizi is currently classified as critically endangered, and was placed on the IUCN red list in 2017. Currently, there may be less than 49 remaining mature A. petriruizi.
