= Pristimantis viridis =

Conservation status
- Endangered (IUCN 3.1)

Scientific classification
- Kingdom: Animalia
- Phylum: Chordata
- Class: Amphibia
- Order: Anura
- Clade: Brachycephaloidea
- Family: Craugastoridae
- Genus: Pristimantis
- Species: P. viridis

Binomial name
- Pristimantis viridis (Ruíz-Carranza, Lynch & Ardila-Robayo, 1997)

Synonyms
- Eleutherodactylus viridis Ruíz-Carranza, Lynch & Ardila-Robayo, 1997

Species of frog

Pristimantis viridis is a species of frog in the family Strabomantidae. It is endemic to Colombia. Its natural habitat is tropical moist montane forests.
