= Hyloscirtus armatus =

Conservation status
- Near Threatened (IUCN 3.1)

Scientific classification
- Kingdom: Animalia
- Phylum: Chordata
- Class: Amphibia
- Order: Anura
- Family: Hylidae
- Genus: Hyloscirtus
- Species: H. armatus

Binomial name
- Hyloscirtus armatus (Boulenger, 1902)

Species of frog

Hyloscirtus armatus is a species of frog in the family Hylidae found in Bolivia and Peru. It has been observed between 1700 and 2400 meters above sea level. Its natural habitats are subtropical or tropical moist montane forests and rivers. It is threatened by habitat loss. Most likely, this is a species complex, composed of several species.
