= Hyloscirtus sethmacfarlanei =

Scientific classification
- Kingdom: Animalia
- Phylum: Chordata
- Class: Amphibia
- Order: Anura
- Family: Hylidae
- Genus: Hyloscirtus
- Species: H. sethmacfarlanei

Binomial name
- Hyloscirtus sethmacfarlanei Reyes-Puig, Recalde, Recalde, Koch, Guayasamin, Cisneros-Heredia, Jost, and Yánez-Muñoz, 2022

Species of frog

Hyloscirtus sethmacfarlanei, commonly known as Seth MacFarlane's torrent frog, is a species of frog in the family Hylidae. It is endemic to forest habitats in Ecuador. It has been observed in the Machay Reserve on Cerro Mayordomo, at 2970 meters above sea level.

The adult female frog measures about 72 mm in snout-vent length. Adult frogs are black with distinctive orange or red spots. Young frogs are bright yellow. Scientists note that the frog is toxic: Handling specimens with bare skin caused tingling, itching, and pain that lasted for hours. They believe the frog may secrete a chemical that makes it taste bad to predators or causes predators to sicken and that the coloration may be aposematic.

Scientists observed this frog sitting in bromeliad plants 60–90 cm above the forest floor.

The species was named in honour of Family Guy creator and television performer Seth MacFarlane.
