= Cauca tree frog =

Conservation status
- Endangered (IUCN 3.1)

Scientific classification
- Kingdom: Animalia
- Phylum: Chordata
- Class: Amphibia
- Order: Anura
- Family: Hylidae
- Genus: Hyloscirtus
- Species: H. caucanus

Binomial name
- Hyloscirtus caucanus (Ardila-Robayo, Ruíz-Carranza & Roa-Trujillo, 1993)

Species of amphibian

The Cauca tree frog (Hyloscirtus caucanus) is a species of frog in the family Hylidae. Endemic to Colombia, its natural habitats are subtropical or tropical moist montane forests and rivers. Scientists have seen it between 2400 and 2720 meters above sea level. The frog is threatened by habitat loss.
