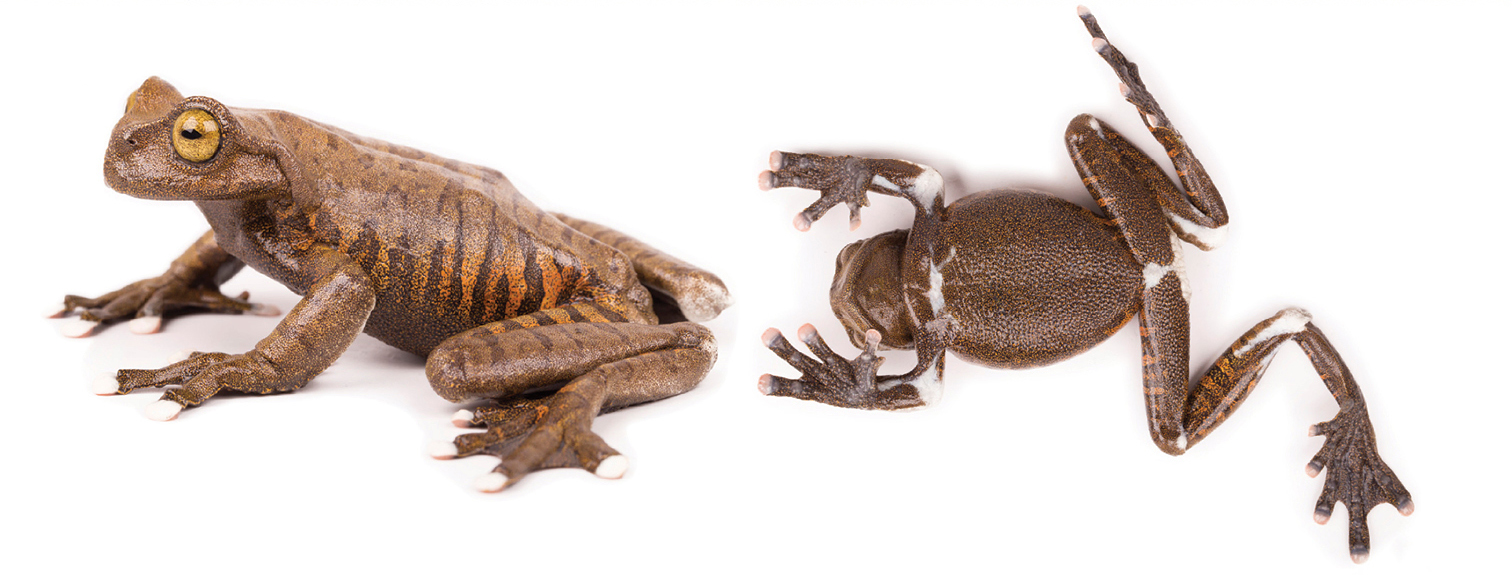

Conservation status
- Endangered (IUCN 3.1)

Scientific classification
- Kingdom: Animalia
- Phylum: Chordata
- Class: Amphibia
- Order: Anura
- Family: Hylidae
- Genus: Hyloscirtus
- Species: H. tapichalaca

Binomial name
- Hyloscirtus tapichalaca (Kizirian, Coloma, and Paredes-Recalde, 2003)

Synonyms
- Hyla tapichalaca Kizirian, Coloma, and Paredes-Recalde, 2003; Boana tapichalaca (Kizirian, Coloma, and Paredes-Recalde, 2003); Colomascirtus tapichalaca (Kizirian, Coloma, and Paredes-Recalde, 2003)

= Hyloscirtus tapichalaca =

Species of frog

Hyloscirtus tapichalaca is a species of frog in the family Hylidae. It is endemic to Ecuador and only known from the vicinity of its type locality in the Tapichalaca Biological Reserve, Zamora-Chinchipe Province. It is named after the type locality, which is a reserve owned by the Fundación de Conservación Jocotoco. Hyloscirtus tapichalaca belongs to the Hyloscirtus larinopygion group, although its placement with the group is uncertain; it may be the sister taxon of all other species in the group.

== Description ==
Adult males measure 59–64 mm (2.3–2.5 in) and adult females 62–67 mm (2.4–2.6 in) in snout–vent length. The body and the limbs are robust. The snout is nearly truncate in lateral view. The tympanum is distinct, and the supratympanic fold is thick, obscuring its posterodorsal edge. The fingers, and the toes are broad, bear large discs, and have webbing. The dorsum is gray to pale brown, and the flanks are gray to gray brown. The digital discs, lateral and lower margins of vent, knees, elbows, and outer margin of forearms are white. The iris is yellow-gold. Males have a single subgular vocal sac.

== Reproduction ==
The male advertisement call consists of a single, unpulsed note of variable duration (0.14–0.19 seconds). The calls are emitted at irregular time intervals (0.7–1.2 seconds apart), most of them clustered in bouts. Scars in the males suggest male-male combats. A 62-mm female contained 428 ovarian eggs some 3 mm (0.1 in) in diameter. The tadpoles probably develop in streams.

== Behavior ==
Hyloscirtus tapichalaca exude a sticky, white fluid when captured. One specimen assumed a posture where the white markings in the posterior surfaces of the elbows, heels, and vent were exposed. This is likely an anti-predator behavior.

== Habitat and conservation ==
The type locality is a small cascading stream in montane cloud forest. There are records from elevations of 1,637 to 2,697 m (5,371 to 8,848 ft) above sea level. Males have been observed calling from branches by stream margins.

Threats to this species are unknown. The type locality is a protected area. Habitat degradation likely occurs outside the reserve.

Hyloscirtus tapichalaca is only known from the Tapichalaca Biological Reserve in Ecuador
