= Pristimantis polychrus =

Conservation status
- Vulnerable (IUCN 3.1)

Scientific classification
- Kingdom: Animalia
- Phylum: Chordata
- Class: Amphibia
- Order: Anura
- Clade: Brachycephaloidea
- Family: Craugastoridae
- Genus: Pristimantis
- Species: P. polychrus

Binomial name
- Pristimantis polychrus (Ruíz-Carranza, Lynch & Ardila-Robayo, 1997)

Synonyms
- Eleutherodactylus polychrus Ruíz-Carranza, Lynch & Ardila-Robayo, 1997

Species of frog

Pristimantis polychrus is a species of frog in the family Strabomantidae.

It is endemic to Colombia. Its natural habitats are tropical moist montane forests and rivers. It is threatened by habitat loss.
