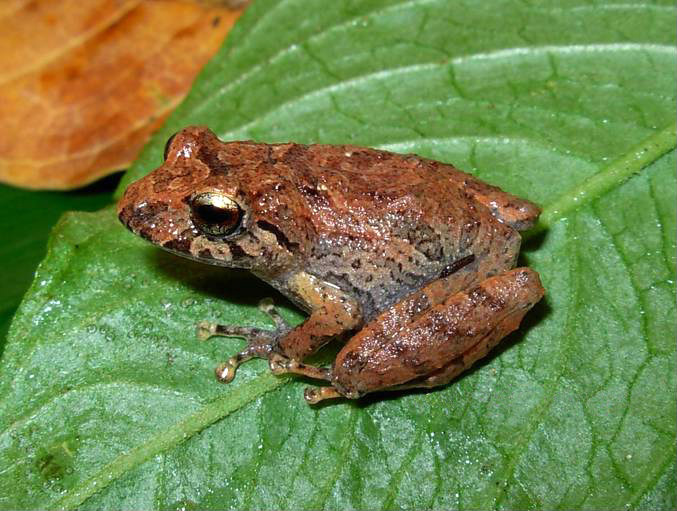

Conservation status
- Least Concern (IUCN 3.1)

Scientific classification
- Kingdom: Animalia
- Phylum: Chordata
- Class: Amphibia
- Order: Anura
- Clade: Brachycephaloidea
- Family: Craugastoridae
- Genus: Pristimantis
- Subgenus: Pristimantis
- Species: P. paisa

Binomial name
- Pristimantis paisa (Lynch and Ardila-Robayo, 1999)

Synonyms
- Eleutherodactylus paisa Lynch and Ardila-Robayo, 1999

= Pristimantis paisa =

Species of frog

Pristimantis paisa is a species of frog in the family Strabomantidae. It is endemic to Colombia and is only known from the Cordillera Central in the Antioquia Department. The specific name refers to the inhabitants of the area where this frog occurs, called paisas.

== Description ==
Male Pristimantis paisa measure 20–24 mm (0.79–0.94 in) in snout–vent length and females 28–31 mm (1.1–1.2 in). Tympanum is not prominent. The fingers and the toes have discs and lateral keels but no webbing. Skin is smooth. Coloration is drab brown without well developed patterns.

== Habitat ==
Pristimantis paisa inhabits Andean cloud forests and paramo at elevations of 1,800–3,100 m (5,900–10,200 ft) above sea level. It is a nocturnal species that requires high moisture.

Pristimantis paisa is a quite common frog that is able to persist in secondary forest and wet pastureland. It can locally suffer from ranching and agriculture. It is not present in protected areas.
