= Gastrotheca antomia =

Conservation status
- Critically Endangered (IUCN 3.1)

Scientific classification
- Kingdom: Animalia
- Phylum: Chordata
- Class: Amphibia
- Order: Anura
- Family: Hemiphractidae
- Genus: Gastrotheca
- Species: G. antomia

Binomial name
- Gastrotheca antomia Ruiz-Carranza, Ardila-Robayo, Lynch, and Restrepo, 1997

Synonyms
- Gastrotheca antomia Ruiz-Carranza, Ardila-Robayo, Lynch, and Restrepo-Toro, 1997; Gastrotheca (Opisthodelphys) anatomia Savage, 2002; Gastrotheca (Amphignathodon) antomia Duellman, 2015; Amphignathodon anatomius Dubois, Ohler, and Pyron, 2021

Species of frog

Gastrotheca antomia is a species of frog in the family Hemiphractidae. It is endemic to Colombia and found on the western versant of the Cordillera Occidental in Antioquia, Risaralda, Chocó, and Valle del Cauca Departments, at elevations of 1,140–2,500 m (3,740–8,200 ft) asl.

== Habitat ==
Scientists have found solely in primary forest, where they saw it on vegetation. There are two protected places with in the frog's known range, Tatamá National Park and Reserva Natural Cerro El Inglés, and a third nearby, Farallones de Cali National Park.

== Reproduction ==
The female frog carries her eggs in a pouch on her back. The young emerge as froglets, not larval tadpoles.

== Threats ==
The IUCN classifies this species as critically endangered. The principal threat is habitat loss in favor of agriculture, cattle raising, logging. Scientists have detected the dangerous fungus Batrachochytrium dendrobatidis on two populations but have yet to confirm the threat posed by chytridiomycosis.
