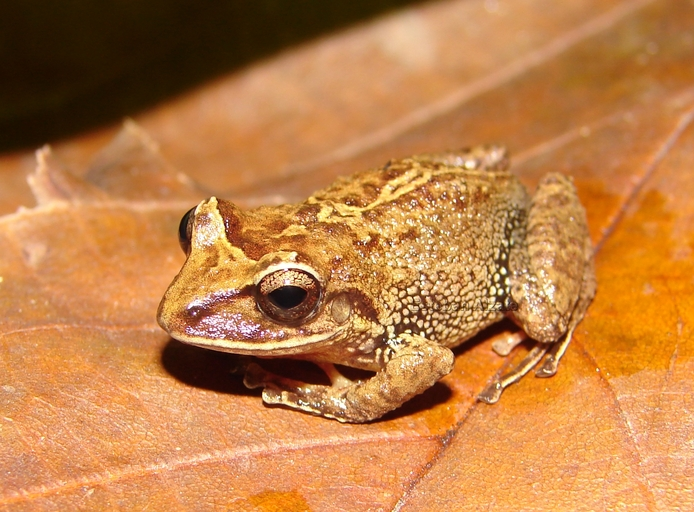

Conservation status
- Least Concern (IUCN 3.1)

Scientific classification
- Kingdom: Animalia
- Phylum: Chordata
- Class: Amphibia
- Order: Anura
- Clade: Brachycephaloidea
- Family: Craugastoridae
- Genus: Pristimantis
- Species: P. permixtus

Binomial name
- Pristimantis permixtus (Lynch, Ruiz-Carranza, and Ardila-Robayo, 1994)

Synonyms
- Eleutherodactylus permixtus Lynch, Ruíz-Carranza, and Ardila-Robayo, 1994

= Pristimantis permixtus =

Species of frog

Pristimantis permixtus is a species of frog in the family Strabomantidae. It is endemic to Colombia where it is found on the Cordillera Occidental and the Cordillera Central in Antioquia, Caldas, Quindío, Risaralda, Tolima, and Valle del Cauca departments.

== Description ==
The characteristics of this species are: a dark reticulation enclosing pale spots in the groin and the concealed surfaces of the thighs; distinct labial stripes and a distinct, superficial Tympanum; the eyelid and the heel either having nonconical or subconical tubercles; the absence of vocal slits in males and a polymorphic dorsal pattern.

Pristimantis permixtus is a moderately sized frog. Size varies between populations with southern populations being smaller. Males measure from 22–31 mm (0.87–1.22 in) in snout–vent length and females 32–45 mm (1.3–1.8 in); in a southern population, at the lower altitudinal limit of the species, males measured 24 mm (0.94 in) in snout–vent length and females only 27 mm (1.1 in), on average.

Pristimantis permixtus is most similar to and been mixed with Pristimantis supernatis.

== Habitat and conservation ==
Its natural habitats are cloud forests and sub-páramo shrubland. It also occurs in secondary forests and disturbed areas. It is a nocturnal species that occurs on low vegetation, up to 2 metres above the ground.

Pristimantis permixtus is an abundant, widespread, and adaptable species, and there are no major threats to it.
