= Roque tree frog =

Conservation status
- Least Concern (IUCN 3.1)

Scientific classification
- Kingdom: Animalia
- Phylum: Chordata
- Class: Amphibia
- Order: Anura
- Family: Hylidae
- Genus: Hyloscirtus
- Species: H. phyllognathus

Binomial name
- Hyloscirtus phyllognathus (Melin, 1941)

Species of amphibian

The Roque tree frog (Hyloscirtus phyllognathus) is a species of frog in the family Hylidae found in Colombia, Ecuador, and Peru. Its natural habitats are subtropical or tropical moist lowland forests, subtropical or tropical moist montane forests, and rivers. It is threatened by habitat loss.
