= Rio Chingual Valley tree frog =

Conservation status
- Critically Endangered (IUCN 3.1)

Scientific classification
- Kingdom: Animalia
- Phylum: Chordata
- Class: Amphibia
- Order: Anura
- Family: Hylidae
- Genus: Hyloscirtus
- Species: H. pantostictus

Binomial name
- Hyloscirtus pantostictus (Duellman & Berger, 1982)

Species of amphibian

The Rio Chingual Valley tree frog (Hyloscirtus pantostictus) is a species of frog in the family Hylidae found in Colombia and Ecuador. Its natural habitats are subtropical or tropical moist montane forests, rivers, and heavily degraded former forests. Scientists have seen it between 1950 and 2700 meters above sea level.

The adult male frog measures 55.5–68.1 mm in snout-vent length and the adult female frog about 64.1 mm. The skin of the dorsum is olive green in color with orange spots. The skin of the ventrum is white. There are orange spots on the front of the neck. The hidden areas of the legs are black and orange in color. This frog has bright yellow climbing disks on its toes. The iris is gray in color.

Scientists are not sure whether this frog can live in heavily disturbed areas. It is threatened by habitat loss.

This frog's scientific name comes from the Greek language word pantostiktos, for "stained."
