= Morona-Santiago tree frog =

Conservation status
- Endangered (IUCN 3.1)

Scientific classification
- Kingdom: Animalia
- Phylum: Chordata
- Class: Amphibia
- Order: Anura
- Family: Hylidae
- Genus: Hyloscirtus
- Species: H. pacha

Binomial name
- Hyloscirtus pacha (Duellman & Hillis, 1990)

Species of amphibian

The Morona-Santiago tree frog (Hyloscirtus pacha) is a species of frog in the family Hylidae endemic to Ecuador. Its natural habitats are subtropical or tropical moist montane forests and rivers. Scientists have seen it between 2225 and 2350 meters above sea level. It is threatened by habitat loss.

The adult male frog measures 59.5–60.9 mm in snout-vent length and the adult female frog 65.3–68.4 mm. The skin of the dorsum is dark brown in color with metallic orange spots. The fingers and toes and insides of the legs are brown with white lines. The iris of the eye is olive brown in color.

Scientists have only seen this frog near stream environments and do not know if it can live in disturbed areas. It is nocturnal.

This frog's scientific name is a reference to Patricia "Pacha" A. Burrowes, who worked with the research team in the forest in 1984.
