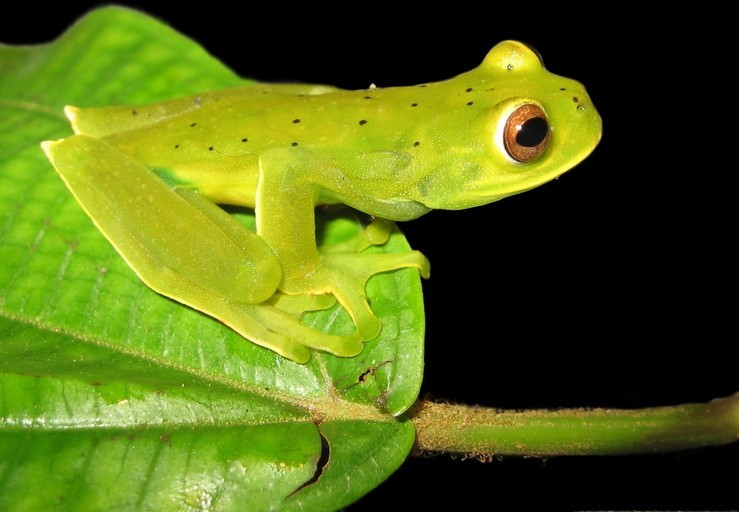

Conservation status
- Vulnerable (IUCN 3.1)

Scientific classification
- Kingdom: Animalia
- Phylum: Chordata
- Class: Amphibia
- Order: Anura
- Family: Hylidae
- Genus: Hyloscirtus
- Species: H. denticulentus

Binomial name
- Hyloscirtus denticulentus (Duellman, 1972)

= Charta tree frog =

Species of amphibian

The Charta tree frog (Hyloscirtus denticulentus) is a species of frog in the family Hylidae. Endemic to Colombia, its skin is green, and it may have black speckles along its spine. Its natural habitats are subtropical or tropical moist montane forests and rivers in the Sub-Andean forests of the foothills of the Cordilleras associated with the Middle Magdalena Valley in the Antioquia Department. It is threatened by habitat loss, agriculture, and livestock ranching.
