= Papallacta tree frog =

Conservation status
- Vulnerable (IUCN 3.1)

Scientific classification
- Kingdom: Animalia
- Phylum: Chordata
- Class: Amphibia
- Order: Anura
- Family: Hylidae
- Genus: Hyloscirtus
- Species: H. psarolaimus

Binomial name
- Hyloscirtus psarolaimus (Duellman & Hillis, 1990)

Species of amphibian

The Papallacta tree frog (Hyloscirtus psarolaimus) is a species of frog in the family Hylidae found in Colombia and Ecuador. Its natural habitats are subtropical or tropical moist montane forests and rivers. Scientists have seen it between 1950 and 2660 meters above sea level in the Cordillera Oriental. It is threatened by habitat loss.

The adult male frog measures about 55.0 mm in snout-vent length and the adult female frog about 60.2 mm. The skin on the frog's back is gray-brown in color with brown and white spots. The flanks and inner legs are white with dark brown stripes. The throat and ventrum are gray-white with brown and gray spots. The iris of the eye is bronze with black reticulations.

This frog's scientific name comes from the Greek word psaros for "mottled" and laimos for "throat."
