= Sardinata tree frog =

Conservation status
- Vulnerable (IUCN 3.1)

Scientific classification
- Kingdom: Animalia
- Phylum: Chordata
- Class: Amphibia
- Order: Anura
- Family: Hylidae
- Genus: Hyloscirtus
- Species: H. callipeza

Binomial name
- Hyloscirtus callipeza (Duellman, 1989)

Species of amphibian

The Sardinata tree frog (Hyloscirtus callipeza) is a species of frogs in the family Hylidae endemic to Colombia. Its natural habitats are subtropical or tropical moist montane forests, rivers, pastureland, plantations, rural gardens, and heavily degraded former forests. Scientists have seen it between 1050 and 3000 meters above sea level. It is threatened by habitat loss.
