= Simmons's tree frog =

Conservation status
- Vulnerable (IUCN 3.1)

Scientific classification
- Kingdom: Animalia
- Phylum: Chordata
- Class: Amphibia
- Order: Anura
- Family: Hylidae
- Genus: Hyloscirtus
- Species: H. simmonsi

Binomial name
- Hyloscirtus simmonsi (Duellman, 1989)

Species of amphibian

Simmons's tree frog (Hyloscirtus simmonsi) is a species of frogs in the family Hylidae endemic to Colombia. Its natural habitats are subtropical or tropical moist montane forests and rivers. It has been observedbetween 1100 and 2000 meters above sea level. It is threatened by habitat loss.
