= Hyloscirtus japreria =

Conservation status
- Endangered (IUCN 3.1)

Scientific classification
- Domain: Eukaryota
- Kingdom: Animalia
- Phylum: Chordata
- Class: Amphibia
- Order: Anura
- Family: Hylidae
- Genus: Hyloscirtus
- Species: H. japreria

Binomial name
- Hyloscirtus japreria Rojas-Runjaic, Infante-Rivero, Salerno and Meza-Joya, 2018

Species of amphibian

Hyloscirtus japreria, also known as Perijá's stream frog, is a species of frog in the genus Hyloscirtus. Its discovery was announced in February 2018.

== Range ==
This frog is endemic to Venezuela and Colombia. Scientists have seen it between 1430 and 1832 meters above sea level in cloud forests on the west side of the Andes.

== Etymology ==
The species epithet honors the Japrería people who live in the area of discovery.

== Description ==
Hyloscirtus japreria is endemic to the Serranía del Perijá and is present at three sites in Venezuela and one site in Colombia. The tree frog can be distinguished from other tree frogs (such as Hyloscirtus platydactylus) by a yellow dorsal area with reddish brown markings and tiny dark brown spots.
