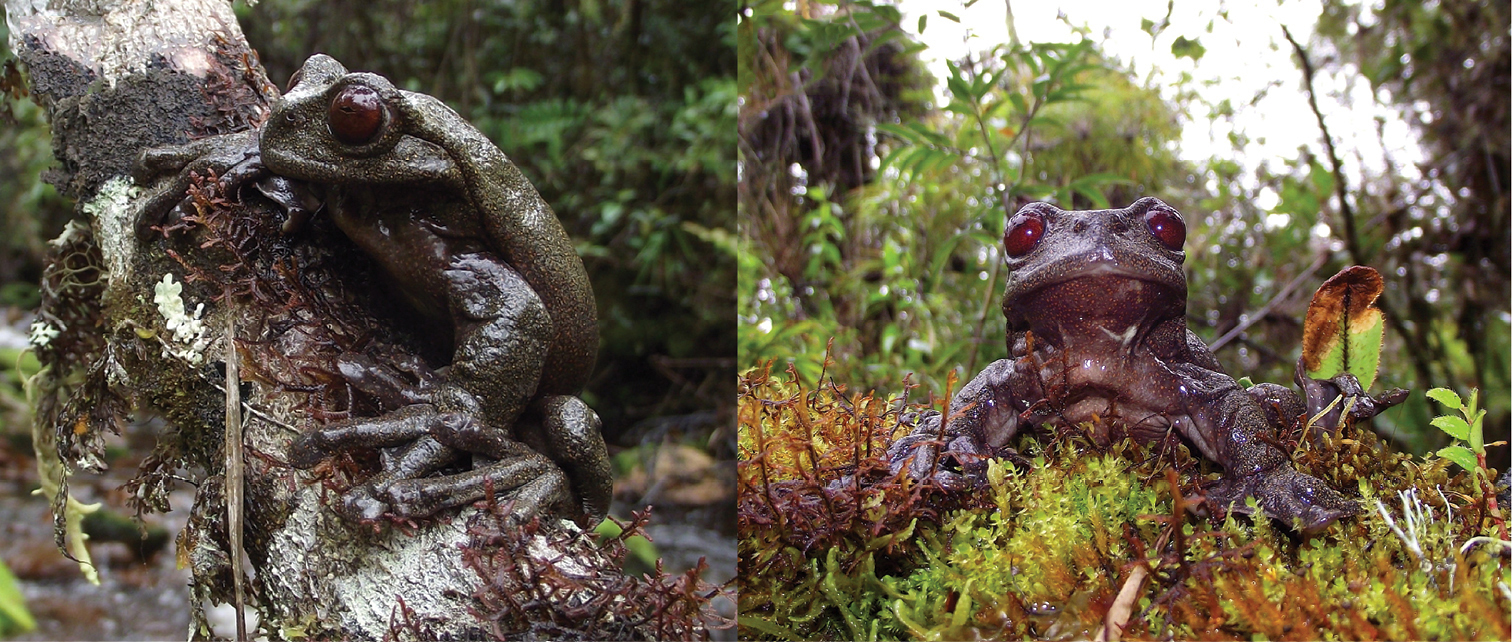
- Hyloscirtus diabolus

Scientific classification
- Kingdom: Animalia
- Phylum: Chordata
- Class: Amphibia
- Order: Anura
- Family: Hylidae
- Genus: Hyloscirtus
- Species: H. diabolus

Binomial name
- Hyloscirtus diabolus Rivera-Correa, García-Burneo, and Grant, 2016

= Hyloscirtus diabolus =

Species of amphibian

Hyloscirtus diabolus is a species of frogs in the family Hylidae.
