= Pristimantis orpacobates =

Conservation status
- Near Threatened (IUCN 3.1)

Scientific classification
- Kingdom: Animalia
- Phylum: Chordata
- Class: Amphibia
- Order: Anura
- Clade: Brachycephaloidea
- Family: Craugastoridae
- Genus: Pristimantis
- Species: P. orpacobates

Binomial name
- Pristimantis orpacobates (Lynch, Ruíz-Carranza & Ardila-Robayo, 1994)

Synonyms
- Eleutherodactylus orpacobates Lynch, Ruíz-Carranza & Ardila-Robayo, 1994

Species of frog

Pristimantis orpacobates is a species of frog in the family Strabomantidae. It is endemic to Colombia. Its natural habitats are tropical moist lowland forests and moist montane forests. It is threatened by habitat loss.
