= Pilalo tree frog =

Conservation status
- Endangered (IUCN 3.1)

Scientific classification
- Kingdom: Animalia
- Phylum: Chordata
- Class: Amphibia
- Order: Anura
- Family: Hylidae
- Genus: Hyloscirtus
- Species: H. ptychodactylus

Binomial name
- Hyloscirtus ptychodactylus (Duellman & Hillis, 1990)

Species of amphibian

The Pilalo tree frog (Hyloscirtus ptychodactylus) is a species of frog in the family Hylidae endemic to Ecuador. Its natural habitats are subtropical or tropical moist montane forests and rivers. It has been observed between 2300 and 2600 meters above sea level. It is threatened by habitat loss.

The adult male frog measures about 65.9 mm in snout-vent length and the adult female frog about 77.3 mm. The skin of the dorsum can be orange-brown or red-brown in color, with large or small black spots. The flanks and parts of the legs have yellow and black bars. The ventrum is black. There can be white spots on the throat. The iris of the eye is light blue.

This frog is nocturnal, but people have heard it singing during the day. This frog lays eggs in streams.

This frog's scientific name comes from the Greek language words ptychos for "fold" and dactylus for "finger."
