= Pristimantis polemistes =

Conservation status
- Critically Endangered (IUCN 3.1)

Scientific classification
- Kingdom: Animalia
- Phylum: Chordata
- Class: Amphibia
- Order: Anura
- Clade: Brachycephaloidea
- Family: Craugastoridae
- Genus: Pristimantis
- Species: P. polemistes

Binomial name
- Pristimantis polemistes (Lynch and Ardila-Robayo, 2004)
- Pristimantis polemistes is only known from Urrao on the western flank of the Cordillera Occidental, Colombia

Synonyms
- Eleutherodactylus polemistes Lynch and Ardila-Robayo, 2004

Species of amphibian

Pristimantis polemistes is a species of frogs in the family Strabomantidae. It is endemic to Colombia and only known from the vicinity of its type locality in Urrao, Antioquia Department, on the western flank of the Cordillera Occidental (Colombian Andes). The specific name polemistes is Greek for "warrior" and refers to the insurgents that operated in the area of the type locality.

== Description ==
Adult males measure 27–28 mm (1.06–1.10 in) and adult females, based on a single specimen only, 33 mm (1.3 in) in snout–vent length. The snout is relatively short, subacuminate in dorsal view and rounded in lateral profile. The tympanum is vertically elongated. The fingers have lateral keels and round terminal disks. The toes have lateral fringes and expanded terminal disks. Dorsal skin bears numerous small tubercles. The dorsum is brown to dark olive with dark brown or black spots edged with yellow or orange. The flanks are brown to olive with dark brown spots, or sometimes with white flecks. There are white glands above the arms and above the groin. The limb have dark brown or black bars edged with yellow or whitish-yellow. The venter is dark brown with large whitish flecks in males but pale brown to brownish olive with black granules in the female. The iris is red above and bronze below and has a black horizontal stripe. Males have a subgular vocal sac.

== Habitat and conservation ==
Pristimantis polemistes is known from patches of primary forest near streams at elevations of 2,300–2,320 m (7,550–7,610 ft) above sea level. Development is presumably direct (i.e., there is no free-living larval stage).

The known distribution of Pristimantis polemistes consists of only two very nearby localities. At the time of the latest IUCN assessment (2018), no other specimens than the type series (collected in 1988) were known. The species is suspected to be intolerant of habitat disturbance. The habitat at the type locality has already been deforested for cattle ranching, and habitat loss is continuing in the area. The range of this species might extend into the nearby Las Orquídeas National Natural Park, although surveys in 2014 in the western portion of the park did not record it; the park is also in need of better habitat protection.
