= Pristimantis supernatis =

Conservation status
- Vulnerable (IUCN 3.1)

Scientific classification
- Kingdom: Animalia
- Phylum: Chordata
- Class: Amphibia
- Order: Anura
- Family: Strabomantidae
- Genus: Pristimantis
- Subgenus: Pristimantis
- Species: P. supernatis

Binomial name
- Pristimantis supernatis (Lynch, 1979)

Synonyms
- Eleutherodactylus supernatis Lynch, 1979

Species of frog

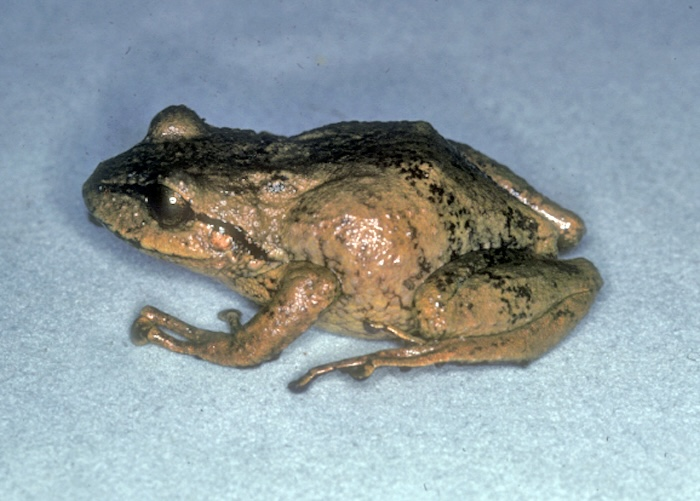

Pristimantis supernatis is a species of frog in the family Strabomantidae. It is found in the Cordillera Central, Colombia, from Nevado del Huila southward to the Colombian Massif and the Carchi Province in northern Ecuador. Some sources report records from further north (Antioquia), but others attribute these to Pristimantis permixtus. Common name El Carmelo robber frog has been coined for this species.

== Description ==
Adult males measure 19–30 mm (0.7–1.2 in) and adult females 31–41 mm (1.2–1.6 in) in snout–vent length. The head is narrower than the body, and the snout is acuminate in dorsal view, rounded in lateral view. The tympanum is prominent, but its upper edge is concealed by the thick supratympanic fold. The fingers have lateral fringes and broad discs. The toes have only indistinct fringes but bear discs of similar size to the fingers ones; webbing is absent. The dorsum is smooth except for some low granules posteriorly. Dorsal color is tan, brown, or nearly black. Some individuals have a yellow to orange vertebral stripe edged with black. There is a pattern of brown to black reticulation or flecks. The lips have a cream stripe. The underparts are cream, occasionally with a pink wash.

== Habitat and conservation ==
Pristimantis supernatis live in cloud forest, sub-páramo, and páramo at elevations of 2,280–3,500 m (7,480–11,480 ft) above sea level. Specimens have been spotted under rocks and logs and in deep grass, but also in bromeliads, leaf litter, and in vegetation as high as three meters above the ground. They are nocturnal. It is threatened by habitat loss caused by logging and agricultural development (livestock and illegal crops). It occurs in the Nevado del Huila and Puracé National Natural Parks.
