= Linda's tree frog =

Conservation status
- Least Concern (IUCN 3.1)

Scientific classification
- Kingdom: Animalia
- Phylum: Chordata
- Class: Amphibia
- Order: Anura
- Family: Hylidae
- Genus: Hyloscirtus
- Species: H. lindae

Binomial name
- Hyloscirtus lindae (Duellman & Altig, 1978)

Species of amphibian

Linda's tree frog (Hyloscirtus lindae) is a species of frog in the family Hylidae found in Colombia and Ecuador between 2000 and 2500 meters above sea level. Its natural habitats are subtropical or tropical moist montane forests, rivers, pastureland, rural gardens, and heavily degraded former forests. It is threatened by habitat loss.

The adult male frog measures 61.1–64.5 mm in snout-vent length and the adult female frog about 64.8 mm. The skin of the dorsum is metallic in appearance. The skin of the ventrum and legs is black in color, but the climbing disks are orange. The iris of the eye is blue-gray with black reticulations.

This frog is a nocturnal animal.

This frog's common name refers to scientist Linda Trueb.
