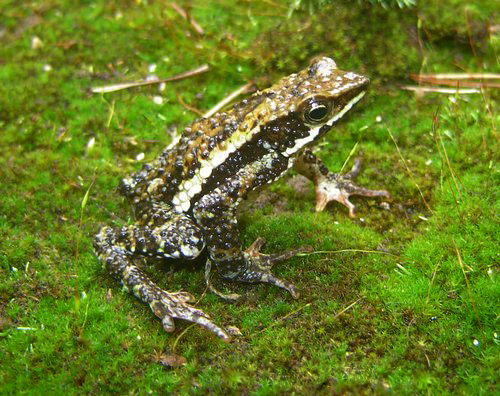

Conservation status
- Endangered (IUCN 3.1)

Scientific classification
- Kingdom: Animalia
- Phylum: Chordata
- Class: Amphibia
- Order: Anura
- Family: Bufonidae
- Genus: Atelopus
- Species: A. laetissimus

Binomial name
- Atelopus laetissimus Ruiz-Carranza, Ardila-Robayo, and Hernández-Camacho, 1994

= Atelopus laetissimus =

Species of amphibian

Atelopus laetissimus, the San Lorenzo stubfoot toad, is a species of toad in the family Bufonidae. It is endemic to Colombia and only known from the area of its type locality in the northwestern part of the Sierra Nevada de Santa Marta, in the Magdalena Department.

== Description ==
Adult males measure 35 to 39 mm (1.4 to 1.5 in) and adult females, based on just one specimen, 54 mm (2.1 in) in snout–vent length. The snout is acuminate (males) or sub-acuminate (female) in dorsal view. The tympanum is absent. The fingers have traces of basal webbing while the toes are fully (toes I to III) to partially webbed (toes IV and V). Skin is smooth on the front part of the head but otherwise bears granules, tubercles, and warts; these are especially prominent in the tympanic area. Dorsal coloration is olive green, yellowish olive, or ocher with spots. There is a dark brown X-like mark between the eyes and the suprascapular area with spots, and an inverted V-shaped in the back. Ventral coloration is olive, cream or rust with light green, pale lilac or brown spots, specks or vermiculations.

== Habitat and conservation ==
The species' natural habitats are sub-Andean forests at elevations of 1,900–2,880 m (6,230–9,450 ft) above sea level. It has been found in both closed-canopy secondary forest and riparian forest. Breeding takes place in streams.

Atelopus laetissimus is only known from three geographically separated locations. The populations appear stable and even locally abundant, but almost all observed animals are males. Habitat loss is a threat, with ongoing conversion of forest to pasture lands acutely threatening one of the populations. The species is also potentially threatened by chytridiomycosis (although as of 2014, the disease has not been detected in Sierra Nevada de Santa Marta). The species is present in the Sierra Nevada de Santa Marta National Park as well as in the adjacent El Dorado Nature Reserve.
