= Hyloxalus saltuarius =

Conservation status
- Data Deficient (IUCN 3.1)

Scientific classification
- Kingdom: Animalia
- Phylum: Chordata
- Class: Amphibia
- Order: Anura
- Family: Dendrobatidae
- Genus: Hyloxalus
- Species: H. saltuarius

Binomial name
- Hyloxalus saltuarius (Grant & Ardila-Robayo, 2002)

Synonyms
- Colostethus saltuarius Grant & Ardila-Robayo, 2002

Species of amphibian

Hyloxalus saltuarius is a species of frogs in the family Dendrobatidae. It is endemic to Colombia where it is only known from the Cordillera Oriental in the Caquetá Department. This frog is terrestrial. Its natural habitats are premontane humid forests. It lives on the forest floor. It has been observed between 1200 and 2000 meters above sea level.

The IUCN classifies this species as data deficient; scientists do not know whether it is in danger of dying out. A survey to its habitat in 2000 showed several individuals. The frog's known range includes two protected parks: Parque Nacional Natural Cueva de los Guácharos and Parque Nacional Natural Cordillera Los Picachos.
