= Hyloscirtus criptico =

Scientific classification
- Kingdom: Animalia
- Phylum: Chordata
- Class: Amphibia
- Order: Anura
- Family: Hylidae
- Genus: Hyloscirtus
- Species: H. criptico

Binomial name
- Hyloscirtus criptico Paredes-Recalde, Morales-Mite, Almeida-Reinoso, Tapia, Hutter, Toral-Contreras, and Guayasamin, 2012

Species of tree frog

Hyloscirtus criptico is a species of tree frog native to Ecuador. It can be found in forests in the Andes at elevations of 2175–2794 meters.

== Description ==
Hyloscirtus criptico is a large frog, with robust limbs. On the sides, black and white bands are present. Orange flecks are present around the dorsum.
