= Lynch's Colombian tree frog =

Conservation status
- Critically Endangered (IUCN 3.1)

Scientific classification
- Kingdom: Animalia
- Phylum: Chordata
- Class: Amphibia
- Order: Anura
- Family: Hylidae
- Genus: Hyloscirtus
- Species: H. lynchi

Binomial name
- Hyloscirtus lynchi (Ruíz-Carranza & Ardila-Robayo, 1991)

Species of amphibian

Lynch's Colombian tree frog (Hyloscirtus lynchi) is a species of frog in the family Hylidae endemic to Colombia. Its natural habitats are subtropical or tropical moist montane forests and rivers. Scientists have seen it between 2540 and 2700 meters above sea level. It is threatened by habitat loss.
