= Atelopus ardila =

Conservation status
- Critically endangered, possibly extinct (IUCN 3.1)

Scientific classification
- Kingdom: Animalia
- Phylum: Chordata
- Class: Amphibia
- Order: Anura
- Family: Bufonidae
- Genus: Atelopus
- Species: A. ardila

Binomial name
- Atelopus ardila Coloma, Duellman, Almendáriz, Ron, Terán-Valdez, and Guayasamin, 2010

Species of amphibian

Atelopus ardila is a species of frog in the family Bufonidae. It has not been seen since 1992, and is believed to be possibly extinct.

== Taxonomy ==
Atelopus ardila was described in 2010. Previously, it was misidentified as Atelopus ignescens. Its specific name 'ardila' was given in honor of Colombian herpetologist María Cristina Ardila-Robayo, whose research led to the description of several new species in the genus Atelopus.

== Description ==
Atelopus ardila is sexually dimorphic. Males are, on average, 35–40mm long (SVL) while females are slightly larger, 40–50mm long. In addition, females have long, slender legs compared to the much stouter legs of males. Both sexes have variable coloration, ranging from yellow, to red-orange, to almost black.

As tadpoles, Atelopus ardila are black in coloration, and look similar to tadpoles of other species in their genus.

== Habitat and distribution ==
Atelopus ardila is only known from its type locality and surrounding areas, the region between Galeras and Laguna de la Cocha in the Colombian Massif of Southern Colombia. They have been found under rocks and in rocky streams, as well as in densely wooded areas.

== Diet ==
Analysis of the stomach contents of specimens of Atelopus ardila revealed that their diet comprises largely of leaf beetles and drosophilidae. They also eat members of the families Pteromalidae, Braconidae, Anthomyiidae, Muscidae, and Tephritidae in lesser amounts.

== Reproduction ==
As amphibians, Atelopus ardila exhibits amplexus. Amplexus in Atelopus ardila has been observed occurring year round, and can last a long time. A wild pair was observed in amplexus for 22 days, and pairs maintained in captivity have remained in amplexus for several months.

Tadpoles live in clear, mountain creeks until maturing. Though they were also seen year round, they were less abundant in the summer months.

== History ==
The first known specimen was collected on August 2, 1965, by R. E. Smalley. The holotype was collected on February 25, 1984, by Patricia A. Burrowes and Benjamín del Castillo. Initially, they were believed to be Atelopus ignescens. Later on, it was believed that they represented a distinct subpopulation of the species. After taxonomic review, Atelopus ardila was classed as a new species in 2010.

The species used to be considered common, but their population rapidly declined in the past few decades. The last confirmed specimen was collected in June 1989. Multiple searches throughout the mid-1990s failed to locate any individuals. Visual records indicate the presence of individuals in 1992, and there are unconfirmed visual records of the species by local people from 1994 and 2002. Searches conducted in the species' habitat between 2000 and 2004 also failed to find any individuals. The IUCN lists the species as Critically Endangered, and possibly extinct. The exact cause of the decline of Atelopus ardila is unknown, but disease, climate change, habitat loss, and impacts from nearby volcanoes are believed to have played roles.
