= Atelopus lozanoi =

Conservation status
- Critically Endangered (IUCN 3.1)

Scientific classification
- Kingdom: Animalia
- Phylum: Chordata
- Class: Amphibia
- Order: Anura
- Family: Bufonidae
- Genus: Atelopus
- Species: A. lozanoi

Binomial name
- Atelopus lozanoi Osorno-Muñoz, Ardila-Robayo & Ruíz-Carranza, 2001

Species of amphibian

Atelopus lozanoi is a species of toads in the family Bufonidae.

It is endemic to Colombia. Its natural habitats are subtropical or tropical high-altitude grassland and rivers. It is threatened by habitat loss.
