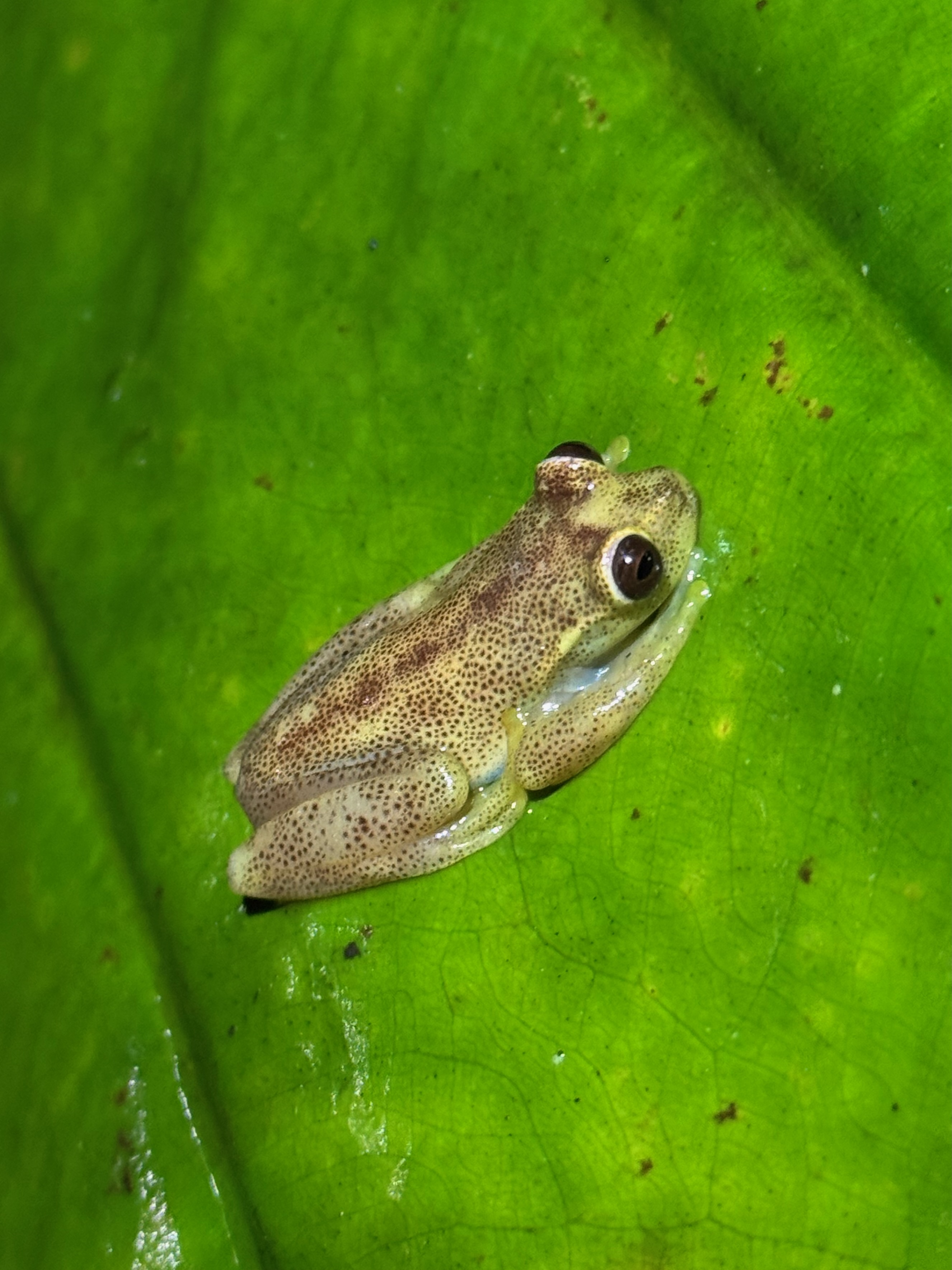

Conservation status
- Endangered (IUCN 3.1)

Scientific classification
- Kingdom: Animalia
- Phylum: Chordata
- Class: Amphibia
- Order: Anura
- Family: Hylidae
- Genus: Hyloscirtus
- Species: H. mashpi

Binomial name
- Hyloscirtus mashpi Guayasamin, Rivera-Correa, Arteaga-Navarro, Culebras, Bustamante, Pyron, Peñafiel, Morochz, and Hutter, 2015

= Hyloscirtus mashpi =

Species of amphibian

Hyloscirtus mashpi, also known as Mashpi torrenteer and Mashpi stream treefrog, is a species of frogs in the family Hylidae. It is endemic to the western slopes of the Ecuadorian Andes and known from a few localities in Pichincha, Imbabura, and Esmeraldas Provinces. It is named after its type locality, Mashpi Reserve. Furthermore, the word mashpi is a Yumbo word meaning "friend of water", which agrees with the habitat requirements of this species.

== Description ==
Adult males measure 29–34 mm (1.1–1.3 in) and adult females 37–39 mm (1.5–1.5 in) in snout–vent length. The body is relatively slender. The snout is rounded. The eyes are prominent. The tympanum is visible but the tympanic annulus is inconspicuous; the supratympanic fold is distinct. The fingers are relatively short with small discs; they have fleshy dermal fringes but only the outer fingers have webbing. The toes are relatively short and bear discs slightly smaller than those on the fingers. The toes have thin lateral fringes but are extensively webbed. Males are dorsally pale green to brown. They have a faint brown mid-dorsal stripe that is darker brown individuals but may also be almost absent. Females are dorsally brown with a darker mid-dorsal stripe. The venter is whitish-cream. The iris is brown with thin black reticulation.

== Habitat and conservation ==
Hyloscirtus mashpi occur in riverine vegetation in primary tropical premontane and montane forests at elevations of 548–1,250 m (1,798–4,101 ft) above sea level. They are nocturnal and have been found perching on leaves and branches 30–400 cm above ground/stream level. Reproduction seems opportunistic and can take place at any time of the year. The tadpoles occur in stream sections with still water.

Hyloscirtus mashpi can be locally abundant but its distribution is patchy and its declining in extent and quality – particularly in the northern part of its range where habitat loss is being driven by mining and dam construction. In the southern part of its range, its habitat is partly protected by private reserves. Moreover, this species seems to have some tolerance to the chytrid fungus Batrachochytrium dendrobatidis as healthy populations have been fond to coexist with the fungus.
