= Charazani tree frog =

Conservation status
- Critically Endangered (IUCN 3.1)

Scientific classification
- Kingdom: Animalia
- Phylum: Chordata
- Class: Amphibia
- Order: Anura
- Family: Hylidae
- Genus: Hyloscirtus
- Species: H. charazani

Binomial name
- Hyloscirtus charazani (Vellard, 1970)

Synonyms
- Hyla charazani Vellard, 1970; Hyloscirtus charazani Faivovich, Haddad, Garcia, Frost, Campbell, and Wheeler, 2005; Boana charazani Wiens, Fetzner, Parkinson, and Reeder, 2005; Colomascirtus charazani Duellman, Marion, and Hedges, 2016

Species of amphibian

The Charazani tree frog (Hyloscirtus charazani) is a species of frog in the family Hylidae found in Bolivia and possibly Peru. It has been observed between 2700 and 3200 meters above sea level.

Its natural habitats are subtropical or tropical dry forests and rivers. It is currently threatened by water pollution.
