= Hyloscirtus antioquia =

Scientific classification
- Kingdom: Animalia
- Phylum: Chordata
- Class: Amphibia
- Order: Anura
- Family: Hylidae
- Genus: Hyloscirtus
- Species: H. antioquia

Binomial name
- Hyloscirtus antioquia Rivera-Correa and Faivovich, 2013

Species of amphibian

Hyloscirtus antioquia is a species of frogs in the family Hylidae.
