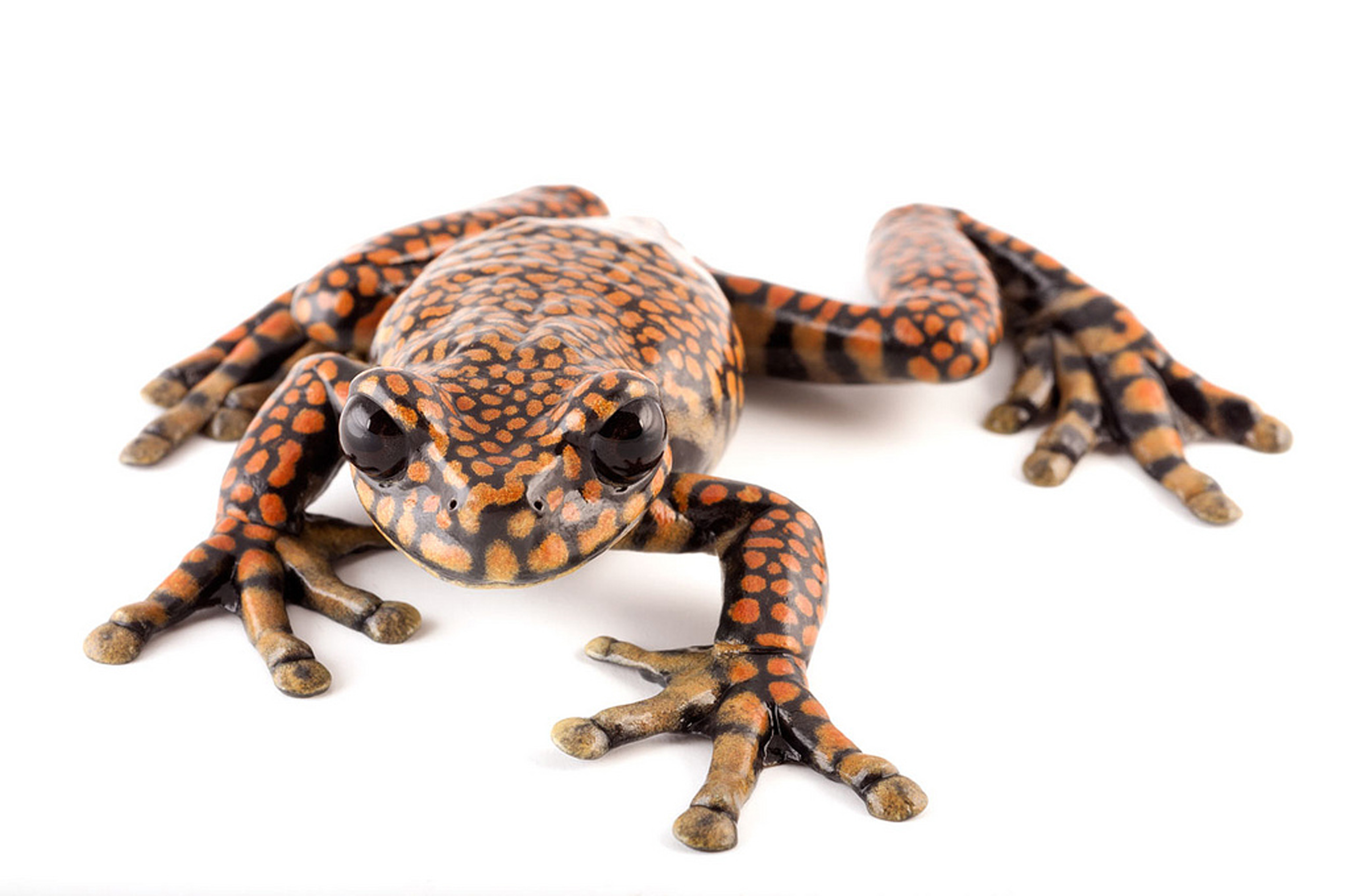

Scientific classification
- Kingdom: Animalia
- Phylum: Chordata
- Class: Amphibia
- Order: Anura
- Family: Hylidae
- Genus: Hyloscirtus
- Species: H. princecharlesi

Binomial name
- Hyloscirtus princecharlesi Coloma et al., 2012

= Prince Charles stream tree frog =

Species of amphibian

The Prince Charles stream tree frog (Hyloscirtus princecharlesi) is a species of frogs in the family Hylidae found in Ecuador. It is considered an endangered species threatened by habitat loss, climate change, pathogens, and other hazards.

In June 2012, the species was described as new to science by Luis A. Coloma et al. in the journal Zootaxa and named in honour of Charles III, King of the United Kingdom, recognising the then-Prince's work advocating rainforest conservation.

== Taxonomy ==
An individual in the species was discovered by Luis Coloma in a museum specimen in 2008. Coloma was later part of an expedition in the Cotacachi Cayapas Ecological Reserve that found small numbers of the frogs, likely due to deforestation. The Amphibian Ark raised several frogs, hoping to boost the endangered population.

== Distribution ==
The frog is endemic to Ecuador, and found only in the northeast, in the Cordillera de Toisán, in Imbabura Province. They're found between 2720 and 2794 meters above sea level, in the tierra fría zone.

== Cultural importance ==
Its name is a patronymic that honors King Charles III, for his rainforest conservation work, such as the 2007 Prince's Rainforests Project, and as head of the UK World Wildlife Fund. In all his campaigns, he has used frogs as a symbol of the rainforest, and been affectionately called the "Frog Prince".
