= Western tree frog (disambiguation) =

The western tree frog is a species of frog in the family Rhacophoridae endemic to India.

Western tree frog may also refer to:

- Western Andes tree frog, a frog endemic to Colombia
- Western green tree frog, a frog found in Southwest Australia
- Western Highland tree frog, a frog found in Indonesia and Papua New Guinea
