= El Pepino tree frog =

Conservation status
- Vulnerable (IUCN 3.1)

Scientific classification
- Kingdom: Animalia
- Phylum: Chordata
- Class: Amphibia
- Order: Anura
- Family: Hylidae
- Genus: Hyloscirtus
- Species: H. torrenticola

Binomial name
- Hyloscirtus torrenticola (Duellman & Altig, 1978)

Species of amphibian

The El Pepino tree frog (Hyloscirtus torrenticola) is a species of frog in the family Hylidae found in Colombia and Ecuador. Its natural habitats are subtropical or tropical moist lowland forests, subtropical or tropical moist montane forests, rivers, and swamps. It is threatened by habitat loss.

The adult male frog measures 31.5–35.5 mm in snout-vent length and the adult female frog about 34.9 mm. The skin of the dorsum is uniform green and the skin of the ventrum white.

This frog is nocturnal. Scientists believe this frog lays eggs in streams because other frogs in Hyloscritus do so.

The scientific name of this frog comes from Latin for "lives in fast-moving water."
