= Jondachi tree frog =

Conservation status
- Endangered (IUCN 3.1)

Scientific classification
- Kingdom: Animalia
- Phylum: Chordata
- Class: Amphibia
- Order: Anura
- Family: Hylidae
- Genus: Hyloscirtus
- Species: H. staufferorum

Binomial name
- Hyloscirtus staufferorum (Duellman & Coloma, 1993)

Species of amphibian

The Jondachi tree frog (Hyloscirtus staufferorum) is a species of frogs in the family Hylidae endemic to Ecuador. Its natural habitats are subtropical or tropical moist montane forests and rivers. Scientists have seen it between 2040 and 2500 meters above sea level. It is threatened by habitat loss.
