= Hyloscirtus chlorosteus =

Conservation status
- Critically endangered, possibly extinct (IUCN 3.1)

Scientific classification
- Kingdom: Animalia
- Phylum: Chordata
- Class: Amphibia
- Order: Anura
- Family: Hylidae
- Genus: Hyloscirtus
- Species: H. chlorosteus

Binomial name
- Hyloscirtus chlorosteus (Reynolds and Foster, 1992)
- Hyloscirtus chlorosteus is only known from Parjacti in the Andes of Bolivia

Synonyms
- Hyla chlorostea Reynolds and Foster, 1992; Colomascirtus chlorosteus (Reynolds and Foster, 1992)

Species of frog

Hyloscirtus chlorosteus is a species of frog in the family Hylidae. It is endemic to Bolivia and only known from the holotype collected in 1979 from Parjacti (=Paracti), on the eastern slopes of the Andes in the Cochabamba Department. The specific name refers to the green bones of this frog. Common name Parjacti treefrog has been coined for it.

== Description ==
The holotype, a subadult male, measures about 39–40 mm (1.5–1.6 in) in snout–vent length. The specimen has a prominent preorbital ridge and moderately heavy supratympapanic fold that continues as a later fold, ending just before to the groin; the tympanum itself is indistinct. The snout is truncate in dorsal view but bluntly rounded when viewed from the side. The finger and toe tips bear large discs. The toes are heavily webbed whereas the finger webbing is moderate. The dorsum is brown with darker pattern. The flanks and the thighs have yellowish markings. The venter is opalescent gold to cream, turning to cream with pinkish tint posteriorly; the chin is opalescent gold. The iris is gold. The bones are green, as hinted by the specific name chlorosteus.

== Habitat and conservation ==
The holotype was found in Yungas forest at 2,044 m (6,706 ft) above sea level. The specimen was collected at night from a door knob at the agricultural customs inspection station. The tadpoles presumably develop in water.

Despite later surveys to the area, no new specimens have been found. The area is suffering from habitat degradation caused by agriculture, logging, and infrastructure development.
