= Pristimantis labiosus =

Conservation status
- Least Concern (IUCN 3.1)

Scientific classification
- Kingdom: Animalia
- Phylum: Chordata
- Class: Amphibia
- Order: Anura
- Clade: Brachycephaloidea
- Family: Craugastoridae
- Genus: Pristimantis
- Species: P. labiosus

Binomial name
- Pristimantis labiosus (Lynch, Ruíz-Carranza & Ardila-Robayo, 1994)

Synonyms
- Eleutherodactylus labiosus Lynch, Ruíz-Carranza & Ardila-Robayo, 1994

Species of frog

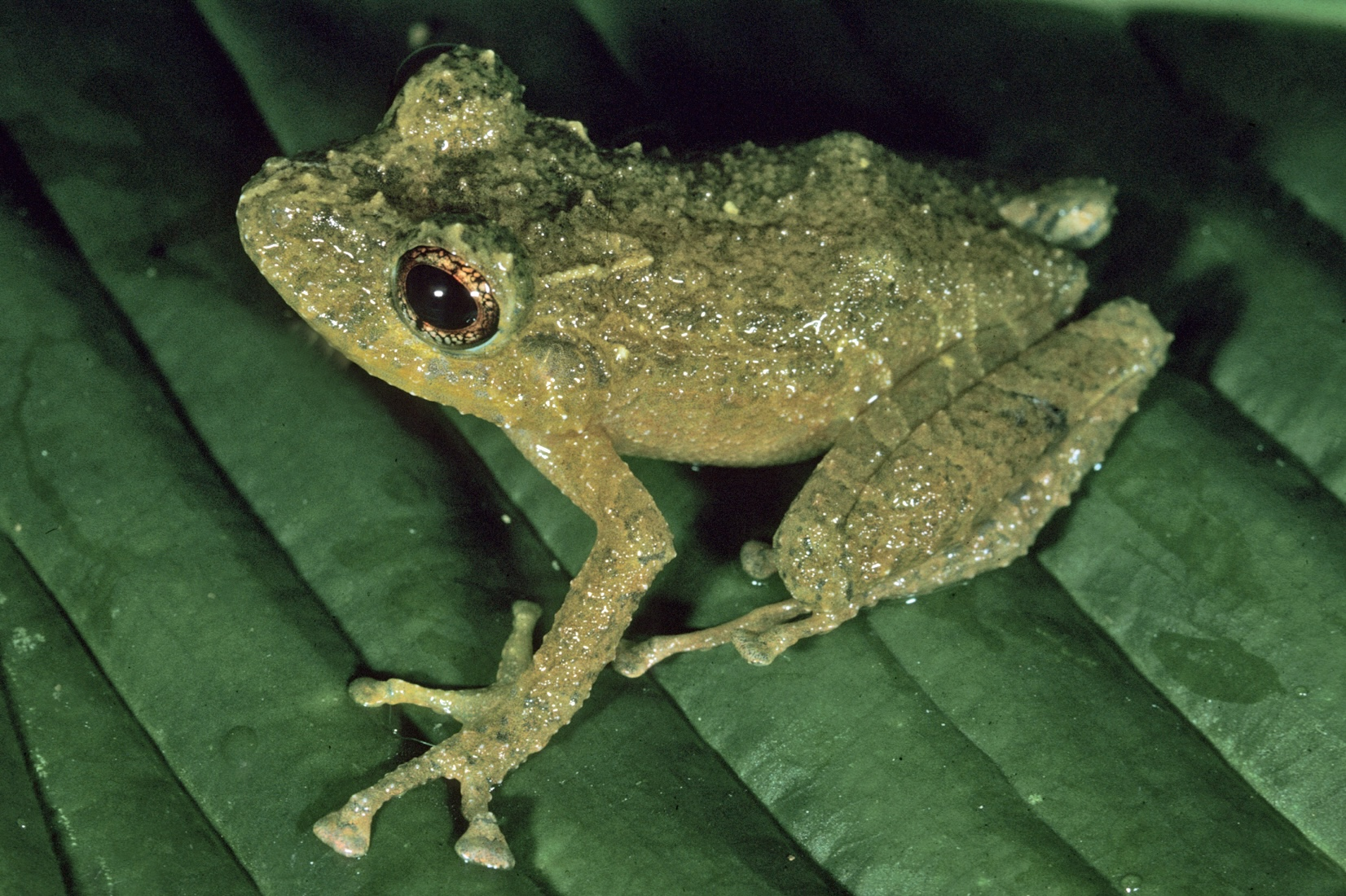
Pristimantis labiosus

Pristimantis labiosus is a species of frog in the family Strabomantidae. It is found in Colombia and Ecuador. Its natural habitats are tropical moist lowland forests, moist montane forests, and rivers. It is threatened by habitat loss.
