= Hyloxalus picachos =

Conservation status
- Endangered (IUCN 3.1)

Scientific classification
- Kingdom: Animalia
- Phylum: Chordata
- Class: Amphibia
- Order: Anura
- Family: Dendrobatidae
- Genus: Hyloxalus
- Species: H. picachos

Binomial name
- Hyloxalus picachos (Ardila-Robayo, Acosta-Galvis, and Coloma, 2000)

Synonyms
- Colostethus picachos Ardila-Robayo, Acosta-Galvis, and Coloma, 2000 "1999"; Allobates picachos (Ardila-Robayo, Acosta-Galvis, and Coloma, 2000)

Species of frog

Hyloxalus picachos is a species of frog in the family Dendrobatidae. It is endemic to Colombia where it was first described in the Parque Nacional Cordillera los Picachos, Cordillera Oriental of Caquetá Department. Its natural habitat is submontane secondary forest between 200 and 1600 meters above sea level, where it has been observed on the forest floor, near streams. This species breeds in streams. The frog has not been observed in any pastures in between its patches of forest, so scientists infer that it is not tolerant to habitat disturbance.

The IUCN classifies this frog as endangered, citing habitat fragmentation as the principal threat. People cut down forests in favor of silvocultural plantings in which cattle graze beneath trees that will eventually be harvested for lumber.
