= Pristimantis aemulatus =

Conservation status
- Endangered (IUCN 3.1)

Scientific classification
- Kingdom: Animalia
- Phylum: Chordata
- Class: Amphibia
- Order: Anura
- Clade: Brachycephaloidea
- Family: Craugastoridae
- Genus: Pristimantis
- Species: P. aemulatus

Binomial name
- Pristimantis aemulatus Ruíz-Carranza, Lynch, and Ardila-Robayo, 1997

Synonyms
- Eleutherodactylus aemulatus Ruíz-Carranza, Lynch, and Ardila-Robayo, 1997

Species of amphibian

Pristimantis aemulatus is a species of frog in the family Strabomantidae. It is endemic to Colombia where it is only known from its type locality in Las Orquídeas National Natural Park, on the Cordillera Occidental in Antioquia. Its natural habitat is the understorey of very wet primary forest.
