= Western Andes tree frog =

Conservation status
- Endangered (IUCN 3.1)

Scientific classification
- Kingdom: Animalia
- Phylum: Chordata
- Class: Amphibia
- Order: Anura
- Family: Hylidae
- Genus: Hyloscirtus
- Species: H. sarampiona

Binomial name
- Hyloscirtus sarampiona (Ruíz-Carranza & Lynch, 1982)

Species of amphibian

The western Andes tree frog (Hyloscirtus sarampiona) is a species of frog in the family Hylidae endemic to Colombia. Its natural habitats are subtropical or tropical moist montane forests and rivers. It has been observed at 2190 meters above sea level. It is threatened by habitat loss.
