= Merida Andes tree frog =

Conservation status
- Vulnerable (IUCN 3.1)

Scientific classification
- Kingdom: Animalia
- Phylum: Chordata
- Class: Amphibia
- Order: Anura
- Family: Hylidae
- Genus: Hyloscirtus
- Species: H. platydactylus

Binomial name
- Hyloscirtus platydactylus (Boulenger, 1905)

Synonyms
- Hyla paramica Rivero, 1961

Species of amphibian

The Merida Andes tree frog (Hyloscirtus platydactylus) is a species of frogs in the family Hylidae found in Colombia and Venezuela. Its natural habitats are subtropical or tropical moist montane forests, rivers, and heavily degraded former forests. It is threatened by habitat loss.
