= Pristimantis simoteriscus =

Conservation status
- Endangered (IUCN 3.1)

Scientific classification
- Kingdom: Animalia
- Phylum: Chordata
- Class: Amphibia
- Order: Anura
- Clade: Brachycephaloidea
- Family: Craugastoridae
- Genus: Pristimantis
- Subgenus: Pristimantis
- Species: P. simoteriscus

Binomial name
- Pristimantis simoteriscus (Lynch, Ruíz-Carranza & Ardila-Robayo, 1997)

Synonyms
- Eleutherodactylus simoteriscus Lynch, Ruíz-Carranza & Ardila-Robayo, 1997

Species of amphibian

Pristimantis simoteriscus is a species of frog in the family Strabomantidae. It is endemic to Colombia and occurs in the Cordillera Central in the Tolima, Quindío, and Caldas Departments. There is also an unconfirmed record from the Valle del Cauca Department. The specific name simoteriscus is diminutive of simoterus, chosen because adult P. simoteriscus resemble juvenile individuals of Pristimantis simoterus.

== Description ==
Adult males measure 23–25 mm (0.91–0.98 in) and adult females 26–31 mm (1.0–1.2 in) in snout–vent length. The snout is short and subacuminate in dorsal view, rounded in lateral profile. The tympanum is prominent. Skin of the dorsum has large flattened warts; the venter is coarsely areolate. The fingers and toes bear slightly expanded discs (those of outer fingers are the largest). The toes have lateral fringes but no webbing. The dorsum is pale yellowish-green to reddish brown and may have black dorso-lateral spots. The throat and venter are greenish yellow and have cream or pale brown spots. The iris is bronze with brown flecks and lines.

== Habitat and conservation ==
Pristimantis simoteriscus occurs in sub-páramo and páramo habitats at elevations of 3,350–3,800 m (11,000–12,500 ft) above sea level. It is found under rocks, logs, and in the roots of grasses among Espeletia plants. It is an uncommon species that is threatened by habitat loss caused by agriculture activities and cattle grazing, in particular burning of the habitat to facilitate growth of grasses. Its range overlaps with the Las Hermosas National Natural Park.
