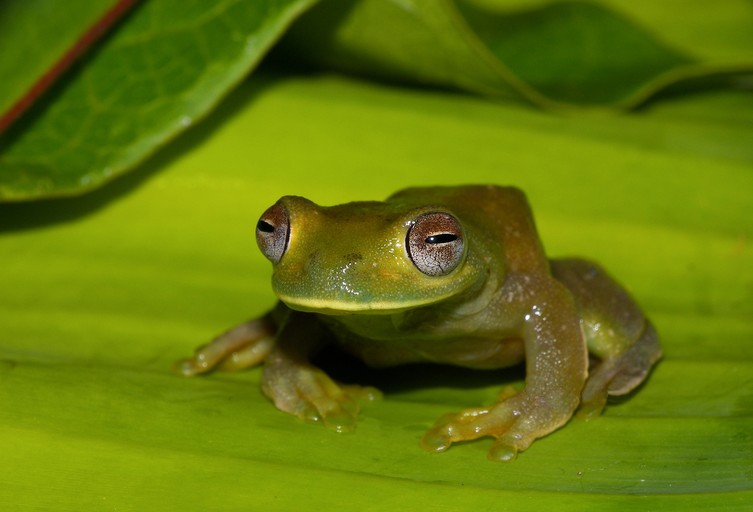
- Hyloscirtus palmeri

Scientific classification
- Kingdom: Animalia
- Phylum: Chordata
- Class: Amphibia
- Order: Anura
- Family: Hylidae
- Tribe: Cophomantini
- Genus: Hyloscirtus; Peters, 1882

Type species
- Hylonomus bogotensis Peters, 1882

Species
- 45 species (see text)

Synonyms
- Hylonomus Peters, 1882 – homonym of Hylonomus Dawson, 1860; Colomascirtus Duellman, Marion, and Hedges, 2016

= Hyloscirtus =

Genus of amphibians

Hyloscirtus is a genus of Neotropical frogs in the family Hylidae. This genus was resurrected in 2005 following a major revision of the Hylidae, with the distinguishing features being 56 transformations in nuclear and mitochondrial proteins and ribosomal genes. Of these species, 28 species, previously placed in the genus Hyla, were moved to this genus. The fingers and toes of these frogs have wide dermal fringes.

They are primarily found in foothill and mountain forests in the Andes, ranging from Bolivia to Venezuela, but a few species occur in adjacent lowlands or páramo, and two (H. colymba and H. palmeri) are found in Panama and Costa Rica. They are typically found near streams where they breed. Several species in this genus are seriously threatened by habitat loss, pollution, introduced species (predation by introduced trout), and the chytrid fungus Batrachochytrium dendrobatidis.

== Species ==
As of May 2026 there are 45 recognized species in this genus:

- Hyloscirtus albopunctulatus (Boulenger, 1882)
- Hyloscirtus alytolylax (Duellman, 1972)
- Hyloscirtus antioquia Rivera-Correa and Faivovich, 2013
- Hyloscirtus arcanus Rivera-Correa, Ron, Nunez, Araujo-Vieira, Pinheiro & Grant, 2024
- Hyloscirtus armatus (Boulenger, 1902)
- Hyloscirtus bogotensis Peters, 1882
- Hyloscirtus callipeza (Duellman, 1989)
- Hyloscirtus caucanus (Ardila-Robayo, Ruiz-Carranza, and Roa-Trujillo, 1993)
- Hyloscirtus charazani (Vellard, 1970)
- Hyloscirtus chlorosteus (Reynolds and Foster, 1992)
- Hyloscirtus colymba (Dunn, 1931)
- Hyloscirtus condor Almendáriz, Brito-M., Batallas-R., and Ron, 2014
- Hyloscirtus conscientia Yánez-Muñoz, Reyes-Puig, Batallas-R., Broaddus, Urgilés-Merchán, Cisneros-Heredia, and Guayasamin, 2021
- Hyloscirtus criptico Coloma et al., 2012
- Hyloscirtus denticulentus (Duellman, 1972)
- Hyloscirtus diabolus Rivera-Correa, García-Burneo, and Grant, 2016
- Hyloscirtus dispersus Varela-Jaramillo, Streicher, Venegas & Ron, 2025
- Hyloscirtus elbakyanae Varela-Jaramillo, Streicher, Venegas & Ron, 2025
- Hyloscirtus hillisi Ron, Caminer, Varela-Jaramillo, and Almeida-Reinoso, 2018
- Hyloscirtus jahni (Rivero, 1961)
- Hyloscirtus japreria Rojas-Runjaic, Infante-Rivero, Salerno, and Meza-Joya, 2018
- Hyloscirtus larinopygion (Duellman, 1973)
- Hyloscirtus lascinius (Rivero, 1970)
- Hyloscirtus lindae (Duellman and Altig, 1978)
- Hyloscirtus lynchi (Ruiz-Carranza and Ardila-Robayo, 1991)
- Hyloscirtus mashpi Guayasamin, Rivera-Correa, Arteaga-Navarro, Culebras, Bustamante, Pyron, Peñafiel, Morochz, and Hutter, 2015
- Hyloscirtus maycu Varela-Jaramillo, Streicher, Venegas & Ron, 2025
- Hyloscirtus pacha (Duellman and Hillis, 1990)
- Hyloscirtus palmeri (Boulenger, 1908)
- Hyloscirtus pantostictus (Duellman and Berger, 1982)
- Hyloscirtus phyllognathus (Melin, 1941)
- Hyloscirtus piceigularis (Ruiz-Carranza and Lynch, 1982)
- Hyloscirtus platydactylus (Boulenger, 1905)
- Hyloscirtus princecharlesi Coloma et al., 2012
- Hyloscirtus psarolaimus (Duellman and Hillis, 1990)
- Hyloscirtus ptychodactylus (Duellman and Hillis, 1990)
- Hyloscirtus sarampiona (Ruiz-Carranza and Lynch, 1982)
- Hyloscirtus sethmacfarlanei Reyes-Puig, Recalde, Recalde, Koch, Guayasamin, Cisneros-Heredia, Jost, and Yánez-Muñoz, 2022
- Hyloscirtus simmonsi (Duellman, 1989)
- Hyloscirtus staufferorum (Duellman and Coloma, 1993)
- Hyloscirtus tapichalaca (Kizirian, Coloma, and Paredes-Recalde, 2003)
- Hyloscirtus tigrinus Mueses-Cisneros and Anganoy-Criollo, 2008
- Hyloscirtus tolkieni Sánchez Nivicela, Falcón & Cisneros-Heredia, 2023
- Hyloscirtus torrenticola (Duellman and Altig, 1978)

AmphibiaWeb also lists Hyloscirtus estevesi (Rivero, 1968), which the Amphibian Species of World, following Barrio-Amorós and colleagues (2019), treats as a synonym of Hyloscirtus jahni.
