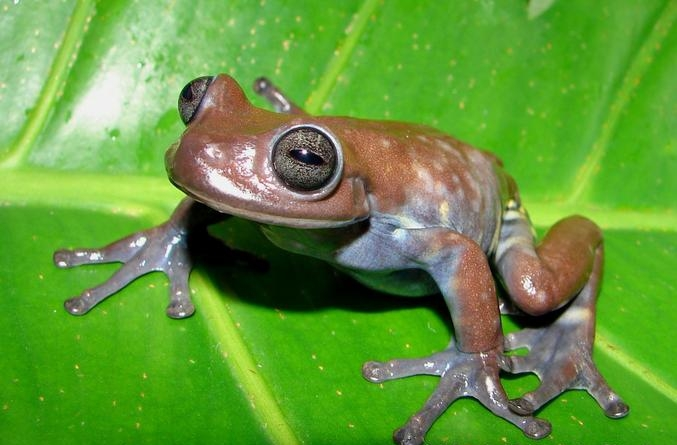

Conservation status
- Least Concern (IUCN 3.1)

Scientific classification
- Kingdom: Animalia
- Phylum: Chordata
- Class: Amphibia
- Order: Anura
- Family: Hylidae
- Genus: Hyloscirtus
- Species: H. larinopygion

Binomial name
- Hyloscirtus larinopygion (Duellman, 1973)

= Cordillera central tree frog =

Species of amphibian

The Cordillera central tree frog (Hyloscirtus larinopygion) is a species of frog in the family Hylidae found in Colombia and Ecuador. Its natural habitats are subtropical or tropical moist montane forests and rivers. It is threatened by habitat loss. While living, this creature has a solid brown dorsum, and its concealed limbs and underbelly are blue with black spots. The younger frogs are a grayish brown with some darker markings. The younger frogs' concealed limbs and underbellies are a creamy color.
