= Hyloscirtus bogotensis =

Conservation status
- Near Threatened (IUCN 3.1)

Scientific classification
- Kingdom: Animalia
- Phylum: Chordata
- Class: Amphibia
- Order: Anura
- Family: Hylidae
- Genus: Hyloscirtus
- Species: H. bogotensis

Binomial name
- Hyloscirtus bogotensis (Peters, 1882)

Synonyms
- Hyloscirtus vermiculatus B. Lutz & Ruíz-Carranza, 1977; Hyloscirtus bogotensis Peters, 1882, Hylonomus bogotensis Peters, 1882; Hyla bogotensis Duellman, 1970; Hyloscirtus vermiculatus Lutz and Ruiz-Carranza, 1977; Hyloscirtus bogotensis Faivovich, Haddad, Garcia, Frost, Campbell, and Wheeler, 2005; Boana bogotensis Wiens, Fetzner, Parkinson, and Reeder, 2005

Species of frog

Hyloscirtus bogotensis, called Bogota tree frog in English, is a species of frog in the family Hylidae endemic to Colombia. It has been observed between 1750 and 3600 meters above sea level.

Its natural habitats are subtropical or tropical moist montane forests, subtropical or tropical high-altitude shrubland, subtropical or tropical high-altitude grassland, and rivers.

It is threatened by habitat loss.
