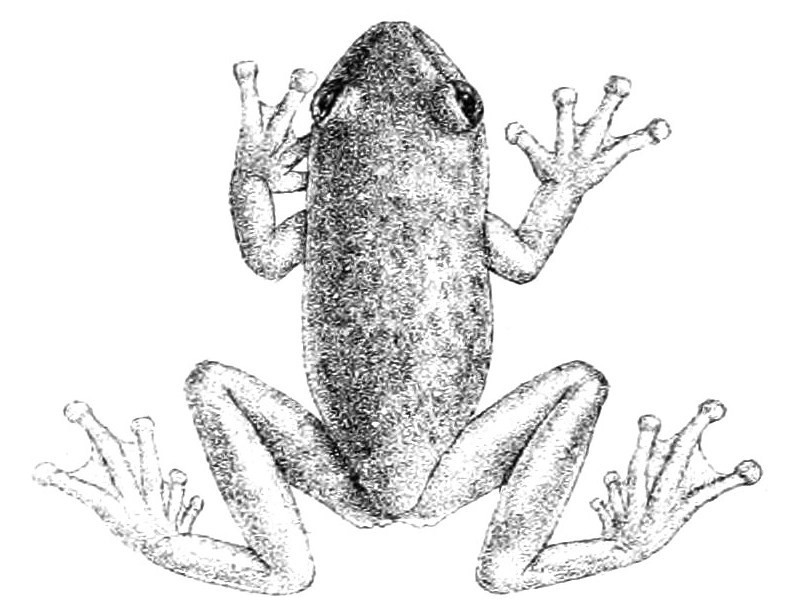

Conservation status
- Least Concern (IUCN 3.1)

Scientific classification
- Kingdom: Animalia
- Phylum: Chordata
- Class: Amphibia
- Order: Anura
- Family: Hylidae
- Genus: Hyloscirtus
- Species: H. albopunctulatus

Binomial name
- Hyloscirtus albopunctulatus (Boulenger, 1882)

= Hyloscirtus albopunctulatus =

Species of frog

Hyloscirtus albopunctulatus is a species of frog in the family Hylidae found in Colombia, Ecuador and Peru. Its natural habitat is subtropical or tropical moist lowland forests.

The adult male frog measures about 33 mm in snout-vent length. The skin of the dorsum is green or red-brown with small dark marks and small white spots. The iris of the eye is white in color with red reticulations.

This frog is nocturnal. Scientists believe it hides in bromeliad plants. The male frog sings for the female frog from under rocks or near arroyos.

The Latin name of this frog means "white spots on its sides."

It is threatened by habitat loss.
