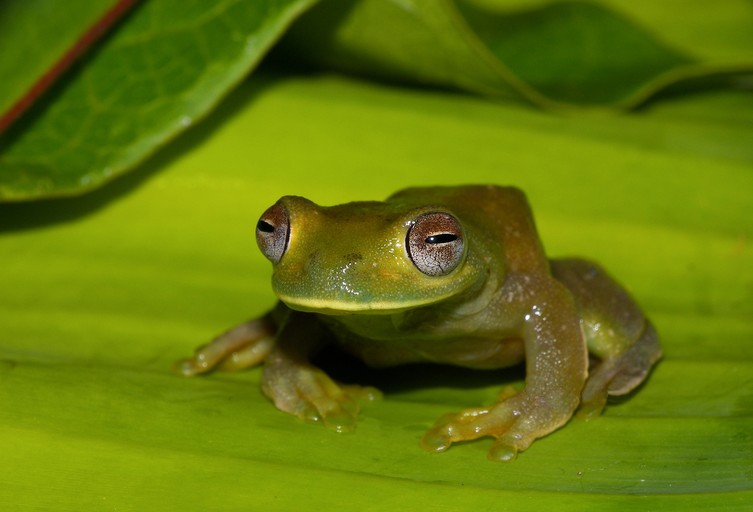

Conservation status
- Least Concern (IUCN 3.1)

Scientific classification
- Kingdom: Animalia
- Phylum: Chordata
- Class: Amphibia
- Order: Anura
- Family: Hylidae
- Genus: Hyloscirtus
- Species: H. palmeri

Binomial name
- Hyloscirtus palmeri (Boulenger, 1908)

= Palmer's tree frog =

Species of amphibian

Palmer's tree frog (Hyloscirtus palmeri) is a species of frog in the family Hylidae found in Colombia, Costa Rica, Ecuador, and Panama. Its natural habitats are subtropical or tropical moist lowland forests, subtropical or tropical moist montane forests, and rivers. It is threatened by habitat loss.
