= Osteocephalus sangay =

Conservation status
- Data Deficient (IUCN 3.1)

Scientific classification
- Kingdom: Animalia
- Phylum: Chordata
- Class: Amphibia
- Order: Anura
- Family: Hylidae
- Genus: Osteocephalus
- Species: O. sangay

Binomial name
- Osteocephalus sangay Chasiluisa, Caminer, Varela-Jaramillo & Ron, 2020

Species of amphibian

Osteocephalus sangay, also known as the Sangay casqued tree frog, is a species of frog in the family Hylidae. It is found in eastern Ecuador in Morona Santiago province. O. sangay is in the O. buckleyi species group and is closely related to O. cannatellai.

== Description ==
The adult male frog measures 40.3–41.3 mm long in snout-vent length and the adult female frog 45.3–52.8 mm. The skin of the dorsum is green or brown in color. It can have bumps made of keratin or dark marks. The tops of the legs and body are light brown with darker brown marks. There is a large dark brown mark on the head. The sides of the head have a cream-colored stripe. There is yellow coloration on the skin outside the eye. The tympanum is green in color or dark brown in color. The flanks are light green, cream-colored, or brown with brown or black marks. The skin of the ventrum is brown with darker brown marks or lighter brown marks. The pupil of the eye has an olive green ring around it. The iris of the eye is bronze in color with black reticulations.

== Etymology ==
The Sangay casqued tree frog is named for Sangay National Park, the type locality of the species. The word "sangay" comes from the Shuar language word samkay, or "volcano."

== Habitat ==
Scientists have found the frog exclusively in primary forest in Sangay National Park between 1551 and 1795 meters above sea level. Scientists observed the animal at night, perched on plants roughly 2 m above the forest floor. Scientists have seen it between 1551 and 1795 meters above sea level. Scientists think this frog has young in streams, but no scientist has written about seeing the eggs or tadpoles as of 2022.

Scientists have only seen this frog in one protected park, Sangay National Park (Parque Nacional Sangay).

== Threats ==
Scientists do not know whether this frog is in danger. They consider habitat loss a possible threat, largely for the as yet hypothetical individuals that might be living outside Parque Nacional Sangay.
