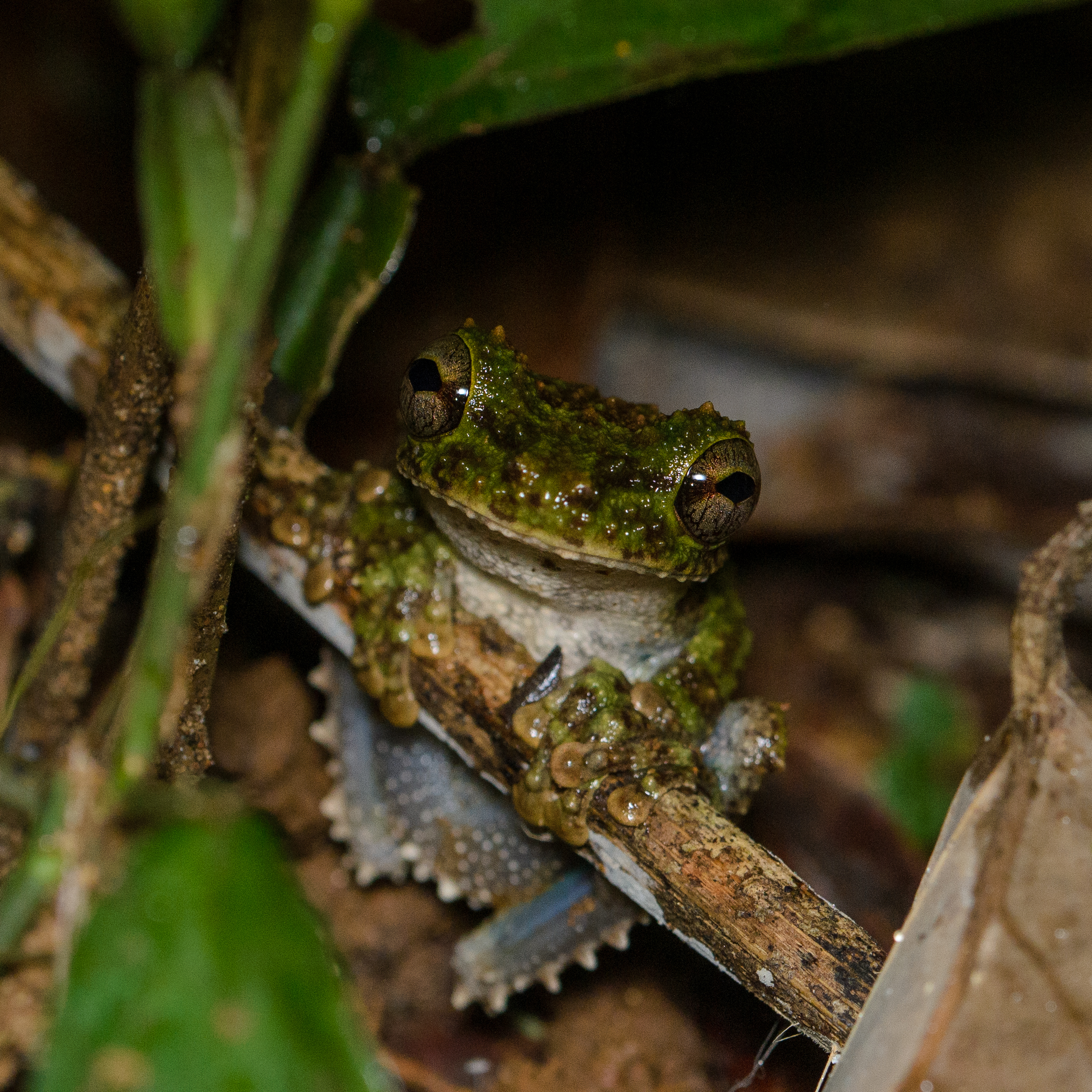

Conservation status
- Least Concern (IUCN 3.1)

Scientific classification
- Kingdom: Animalia
- Phylum: Chordata
- Class: Amphibia
- Order: Anura
- Family: Hylidae
- Genus: Osteocephalus
- Species: O. cabrerai

Binomial name
- Osteocephalus cabrerai (Cochran and Goin, 1970)

Synonyms
- Hyla cabrerai Cochran and Goin, 1970

= Osteocephalus cabrerai =

Species of frog

Osteocephalus cabrerai is a species of frog in the family Hylidae. It is found in the Amazon Basin in Brazil (Manaus), northeastern Peru, Ecuador (Sucumbíos and Orellana Provinces), Colombia (Amazonas, Caquetá, and Vaupés Departments), Guyana, and French Guiana, possibly wider. Some earlier records refer to Osteocephalus buckleyi.

== Etymology ==
The specific name cabrerai honours Mr. Isodore Cabrera, a Colombian naturalist and collector.

== Description ==
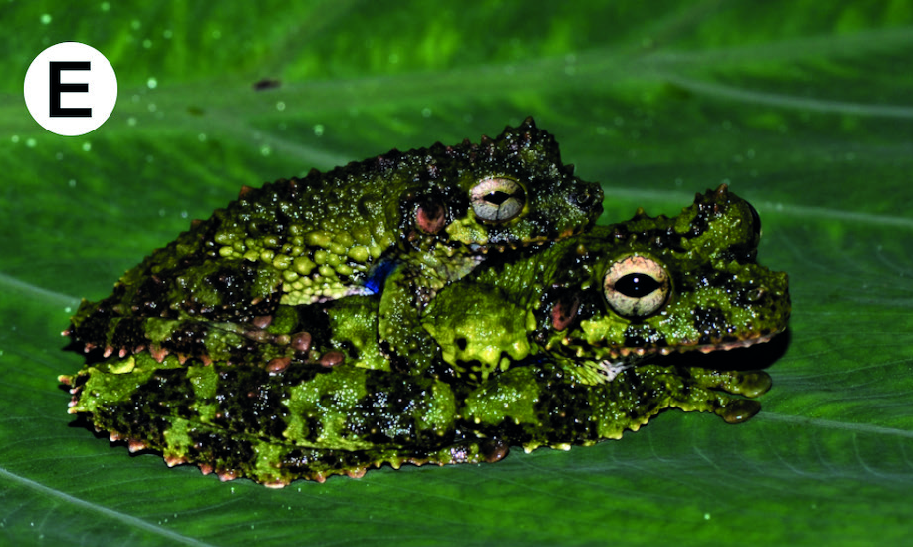
Amplexus. Amapá, Brazil.

Adult males can reach 55 mm (2.2 in) and adult females 71 mm (2.8 in) in snout–vent length. The snout is truncate. The tympanum is very distinct and elliptical; the supra-tympanic fold is tuberculate. The skin on the dorsum is granulate in females and tuberculate in males; these do not have keratinized tips in breeding males as in Osteocephalus buckleyi. The skin on the flanks is areolate. The fingers are one-half webbed. The toes are webbed, reaching base of the disc on the fourth toe. The dorsal coloration is variable, in shades of green with tan and brown blotches, streaks, or a reticulate pattern. The flanks are light and may have tan blotches. The venter creamy is white, possibly with tan spots. A pale supralabial mark runs posteroventrally from eye to mid-tympanum. Males have paired vocal sacs.

== Habitat and conservation ==
Osteocephalus cabrerai is a lowland tropical rainforest species. Specimens have been spotted on low vegetation in primary forest or the forest edge at night. It is an uncommon species that is locally threatened by habitat loss. Its range includes a number of protected areas.
