= Mutabor =

Mutabor may refer to:

- A poem by Karl Kirchwey
- An album by Alina Orlova
- A track on the album Edelweiss by Belarusian band Drezden
- Mutabor, a nightclub in Moscow, infamous for the "Almost Naked party"

== See also ==
- Osteocephalus mutabor, a species of frogs
