= Osteocephalus carri =

Scientific classification
- Kingdom: Animalia
- Phylum: Chordata
- Class: Amphibia
- Order: Anura
- Family: Hylidae
- Genus: Osteocephalus
- Species: O. carri

Binomial name
- Osteocephalus carri (Cochran and Goin, 1970)

Synonyms
- Hyla carri Cochran and Goin, 1970; Osteocephalus carri Lynch, 2006

Species of frog

Osteocephalus carri is a frog in the family Hylidae endemic to Colombia. It has been found in the Amazon lowlands and lower parts of the Andes mountains. Scientists have seen it as high as 700 meters above sea level.

Scientists used to consider this the same species as Osteocephalus buckleyi, but observation of tadpoles showed them to differ considerably.
