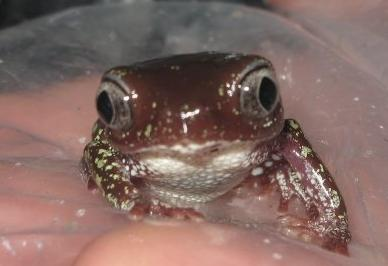

Conservation status
- Least Concern (IUCN 3.1)

Scientific classification
- Kingdom: Animalia
- Phylum: Chordata
- Class: Amphibia
- Order: Anura
- Family: Phyllomedusidae
- Genus: Callimedusa
- Species: C. atelopoides

Binomial name
- Callimedusa atelopoides (Duellman, Cadle, and Cannatella, 1988)

Synonyms
- Phyllomedusa atelopoides Duellman, Cadle, and Cannatella, 1988

= Callimedusa atelopoides =

Species of frog

Callimedusa atelopoides is a species of frog in the subfamily Phyllomedusinae. It is known from Amazonian Bolivia, Brazil, and Peru, and is likely to be found in adjacent Colombia and Ecuador. Common name toady leaf frog has been proposed for it.

== Description ==
Adult males measure 36–37 mm (1.4–1.5 in) and adult females 40–45 mm (1.6–1.8 in) in snout–vent length. The snout is bluntly rounded in dorsal view and truncate in profile. The parotoid gland is diffuse. The fingers and toes bear small discs. The limbs are relatively short. Skin is smooth dorsally. The dorsum is purplish brown and has scattered metallic green flecks. The flanks and ventral surfaces are bluish white with dark purple between the granules. The iris is silvery gray and has black flecks.

The male advertisement call is a single "wort".

== Habitat and conservation ==
C. atelopoides occurs in lowland primary tropical rainforest at elevations less than 200 m (660 ft) above sea level. It is a terrestrial frog that is active on the ground or low vegetation at night. The eggs are deposited on leaves and the tadpoles develop in temporary bodies of water. It is not present in modified habitats. It is a widespread but uncommon species that can locally suffer from habitat loss caused by, e.g., logging and agriculture. It is present in a number of protected areas.
