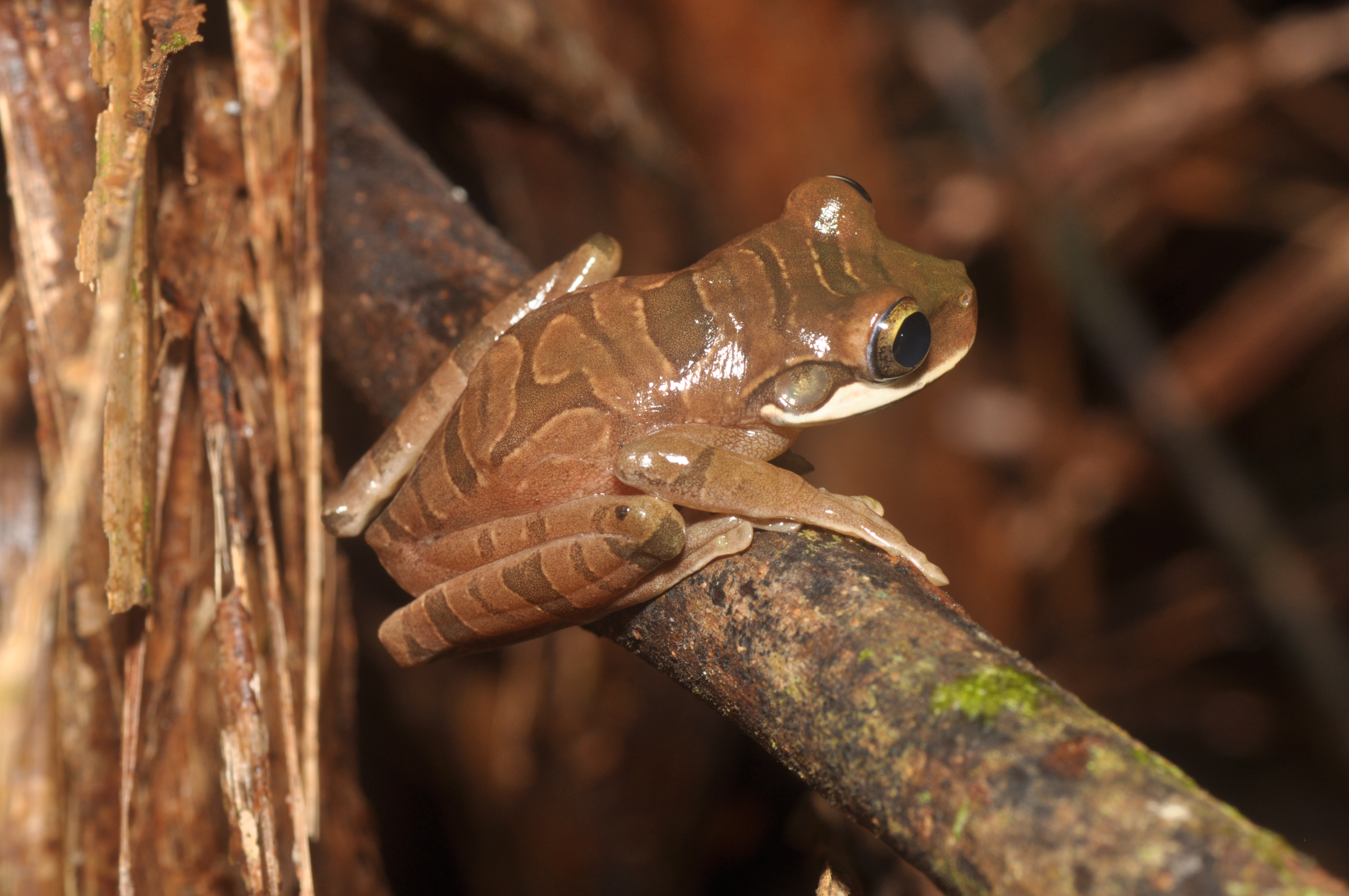

Conservation status
- Least Concern (IUCN 3.1)

Scientific classification
- Kingdom: Animalia
- Phylum: Chordata
- Class: Amphibia
- Order: Anura
- Family: Hylidae
- Genus: Osteocephalus
- Species: O. mutabor

Binomial name
- Osteocephalus mutabor Jungfer & Hödl, 2002

= Osteocephalus mutabor =

Species of amphibian

Osteocephalus mutabor is a species of frogs in the family Hylidae found on the western Andean foothills of Ecuador and south to Ucayali Region of Peru. Before Osteocephalus mutabor was described as a new species in 2002, it was confused with Osteocephalus leprieurii.

== Description ==
Osteocephalus mutabor males measure 36–50 mm (1.4–2.0 in) and females 53–76 mm (2.1–3.0 in) in snout–vent length. Sexual dimorphism is marked: females have a smooth dorsum while males have tubercles hearing spines. The dorsum is tan coloured and has numerous transverse lines or other markings; the pattern is highly variable. Juveniles are markedly different and have red eyes, a broad creamy white interorbital bar, and dorsolateral stripes.

== Reproduction ==
Spawning has been observed in aquarium where mating took place in shallow water. Eggs were released as a clump of 30–40 eggs that floated on the surface and within half an hour had spread to single-layered film. Total fecundity is about 800–1300 eggs.

== Habitat and conservation ==
This arboreal species inhabits primary forests and forest edges at elevations of 200–1,200 m (660–3,940 ft) asl. It breeds in temporary ponds and slow-moving streams. It may occur in slightly degraded habitats.
