= Callimedusa perinesos =

Conservation status
- Endangered (IUCN 3.1)

Scientific classification
- Kingdom: Animalia
- Phylum: Chordata
- Class: Amphibia
- Order: Anura
- Family: Hylidae
- Genus: Callimedusa
- Species: C. perinesos

Binomial name
- Callimedusa perinesos (Duellman, 1973)

Synonyms
- Phyllomedusa perinesos Duellman, 1973

Species of frog

Callimedusa perinesos is a species of frog in the subfamily Phyllomedusinae. It is found on the Amazonian slopes of the Andes in Colombia (Caquetá Department) and Ecuador (Napo and, at least formerly, Sucumbíos Provinces). Common name orange-spotted leaf frog has been proposed for it.

The adult male frog measures 46.2 mm (1.82 in) to 51.5 mm (2.03 in) cm in snout-vent length and the adult female frog 62.2 mm (2.45 in) to 65.2 mm (2.57 in). The pupils of this frog's eyes are vertical. Its Latin name refers to the purple color on its skin. It is mostly green in color, with white spots on its flanks.

Callimedusa perinesos occurs in primary and secondary montane forests at elevations of 1,350–1,740 m (4,430–5,710 ft) above sea level. The eggs are laid on inside leaves rolled up in ponds and pools of water. It is a rare species that is threatened by habitat loss (deforestation), including destruction of its breeding pools.
