= Truebella =

Scientific classification
- Kingdom: Animalia
- Phylum: Chordata
- Class: Amphibia
- Order: Anura
- Family: Bufonidae
- Genus: Truebella; Graybeal and Cannatella, 1995

Species
- 2 species; see table

Genus of amphibians

Truebella is a genus of small true toads, family Bufonidae. It is endemic to the Ayacucho and Junín Regions of Peru. The generic name honors Linda Trueb, an American herpetologist.

== Species ==
Binomial name and author	Common name
Truebella skoptes Graybeal and Cannatella, 1995
Truebella tothastes Graybeal and Cannatella, 1995
