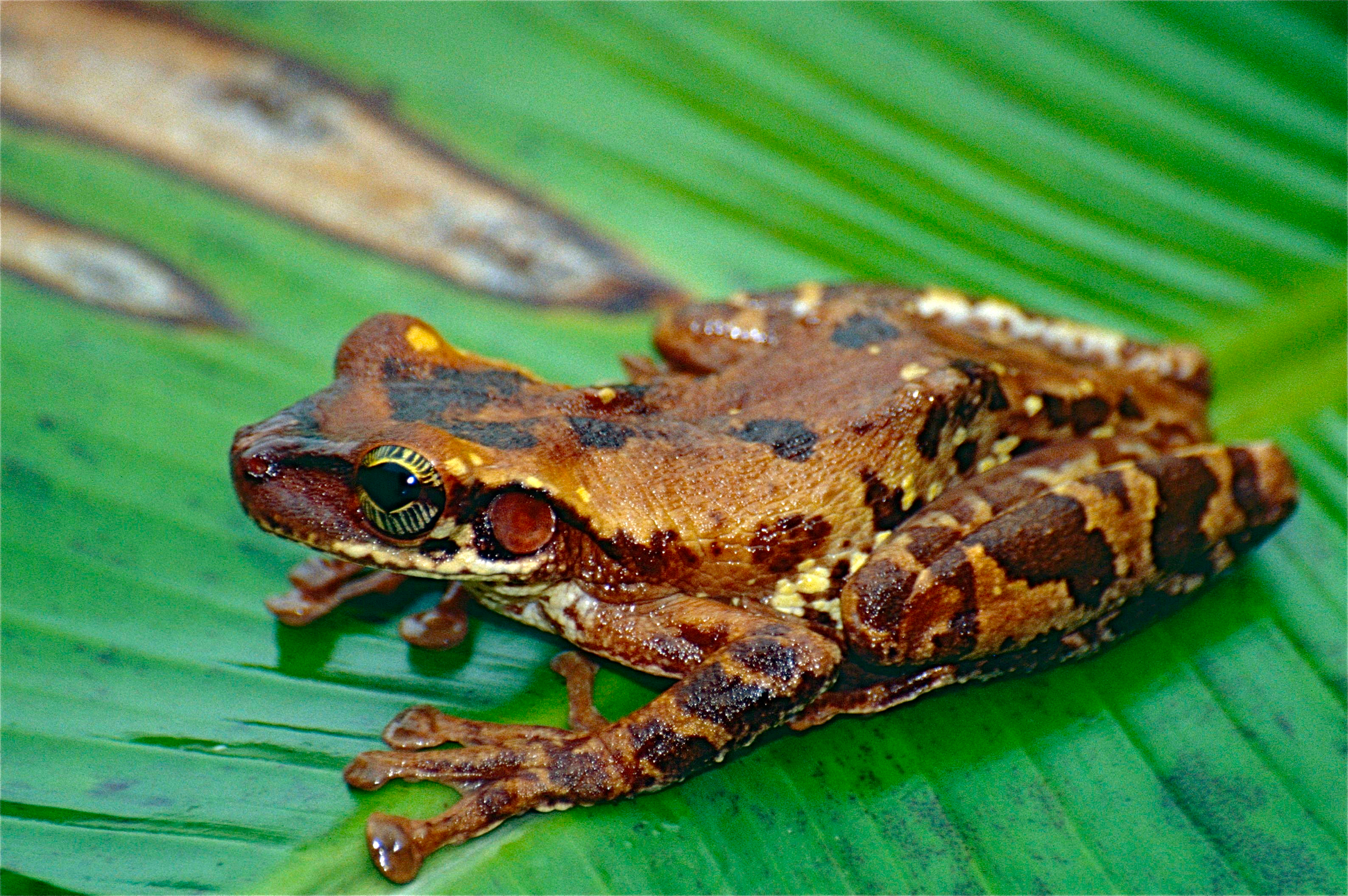

Conservation status
- Least Concern (IUCN 3.1)

Scientific classification
- Kingdom: Animalia
- Phylum: Chordata
- Class: Amphibia
- Order: Anura
- Family: Hylidae
- Genus: Osteocephalus
- Species: O. oophagus

Binomial name
- Osteocephalus oophagus Jungfer & Schiesari, 1995

= Osteocephalus oophagus =

Species of amphibian

Osteocephalus oophagus is a species of frog in the family Hylidae found in Brazil, Colombia, French Guiana, Guyana, and possibly Suriname. Its natural habitat is subtropical or tropical moist lowland forests. It is also reported to produce bufotenin.

Females return to the egg deposition sites at intervals of about five days and, usually in amplexus with the same male, and produce eggs that serve as food for the tadpoles, hence the specific name meaning "egg eater".
