= Osteocephalus heyeri =

Conservation status
- Least Concern (IUCN 3.1)

Scientific classification
- Kingdom: Animalia
- Phylum: Chordata
- Class: Amphibia
- Order: Anura
- Family: Hylidae
- Genus: Osteocephalus
- Species: O. heyeri

Binomial name
- Osteocephalus heyeri Lynch, 2002

Species of amphibian

Osteocephalus heyeri is a species of frogs in the family Hylidae found in Colombia and possibly Brazil and Peru. Its natural habitat is subtropical or tropical moist lowland forests. It is threatened by habitat loss.
