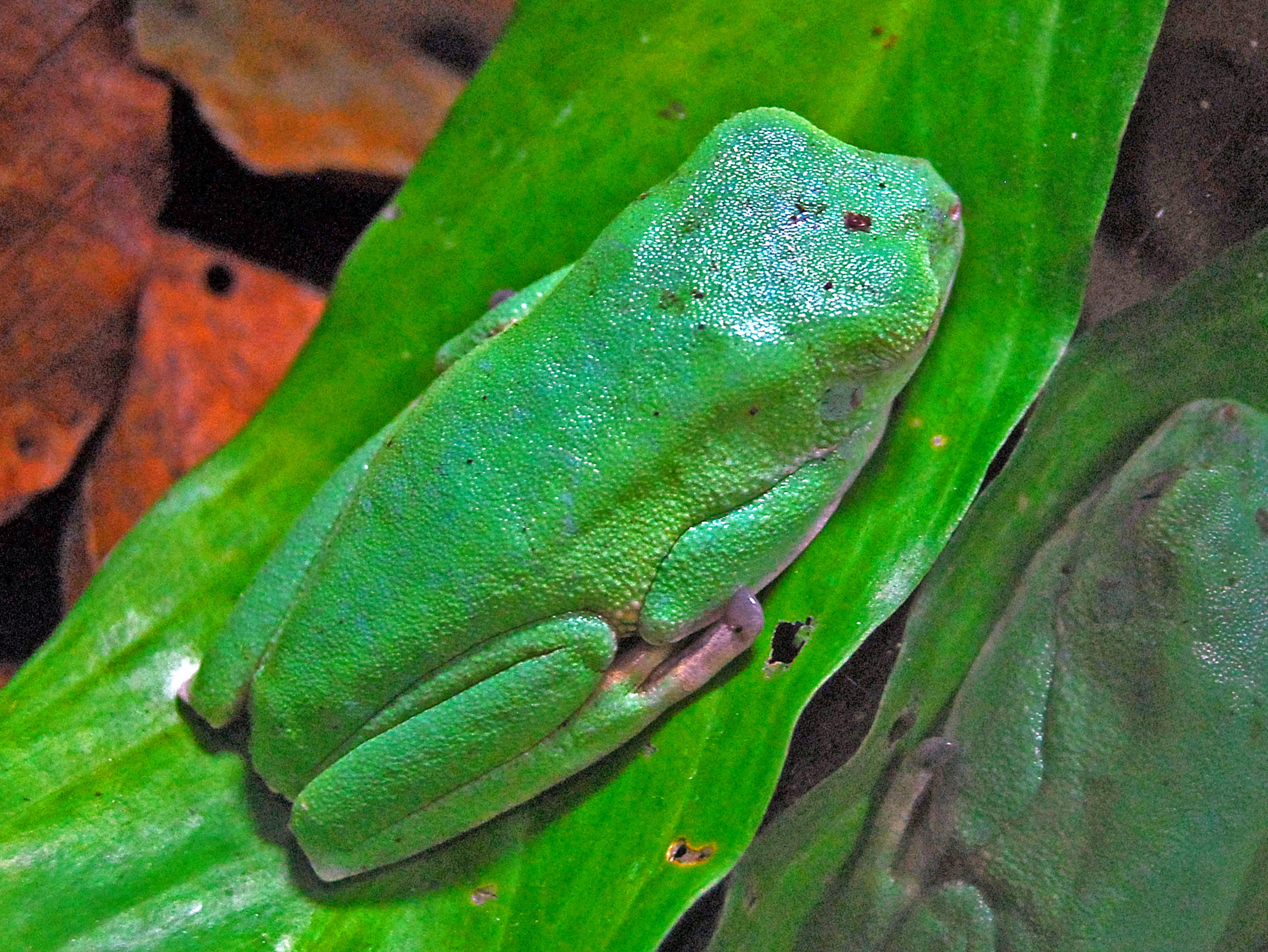

Conservation status
- Vulnerable (IUCN 3.1)

Scientific classification
- Kingdom: Animalia
- Phylum: Chordata
- Class: Amphibia
- Order: Anura
- Family: Phyllomedusidae
- Genus: Callimedusa
- Species: C. ecuatoriana

Binomial name
- Callimedusa ecuatoriana (Cannatella, 1982)

Synonyms
- Phyllomedusa ecuatoriana Cannatella, 1982

= Callimedusa ecuatoriana =

Species of frog

Callimedusa ecuatoriana is a species of frog in the subfamily Phyllomedusinae. It is endemic to Ecuador and known from the Amazonian slopes of the Andes in the Morona-Santiago Province as well as from Cordillera del Condor in the Zamora-Chinchipe Province. Common name Agua Rica leaf frog has been proposed for it.

== Description ==
Adult males measure 46–55 mm (1.8–2.2 in) and adult females, based on a single specimen, 72 mm (2.8 in) in snout–vent length. The snout is short and truncated in dorsal view, sloping when viewed laterally. The tympanum is distinct. The fingers have discs of moderate size but no webbing. The toes have discs slightly smaller than the finger ones; webbing is absent but the toes have slight lateral fringes. Dorsal coloration varies from lime green to yellowish green. Dorsal surfaces of the hands and the feet are purple with irregular orange markings. The ventrum is pale orange with red reticulations.

== Habitat and conservation ==
Callimedusa ecuatoriana occurs in montane cloud forests at elevations of 1,300–1,900 m (4,300–6,200 ft) above sea level. Breeding presumably takes place in slow-flowing streams and in ponds.

Callimedusa ecuatoriana is an uncommon species. It does not occur in modified habitats and is threatened by habitat loss caused by cattle grazing, mining activities, and human settlements. It is found in the El Zarza Wildlife Refuge and Cerro Plateado Biological Reserve.
