= Nymphargus pluvialis =

Conservation status
- Endangered (IUCN 3.1)

Scientific classification
- Kingdom: Animalia
- Phylum: Chordata
- Class: Amphibia
- Order: Anura
- Family: Centrolenidae
- Genus: Nymphargus
- Species: N. pluvialis

Binomial name
- Nymphargus pluvialis (Cannatella and Duellman, 1982)

Synonyms
- Centrolenella pluvialis Cannatella and Duellman, 1982; Cochranella pluvialis (Cannatella and Duellman, 1982)

Species of amphibian

Nymphargus pluvialis is a species of frog in the family Centrolenidae. It is known from the area of its type locality, Pistipata, Río Umasbamba, in the Huayopata District as well as Manu National Park of the Cusco Region of Peru and La Paz, Bolivia. Its common name is Pistipata cochran frog, although it no longer is included in the genus Cochranella.

== Description ==
Male Nymphargus pluvialis measure 25–27 mm (0.98–1.06 in) in snout–vent length. Snout is truncate. Dorsal skin has warts and spinules.

== Habitat and conservation ==
Nymphargus pluvialis is only known from close to streams in montane and cloud forests, or, as was the case with the type locality, coffee and tea plantation with remnants of cloud forest. Individuals are calling during rainy nights from herbaceous plants on very wet cliffs and the upper sides of leaves over water adjacent to streams. Eggs are laid in clutches on the tips of the upper surfaces of the leaves. The tadpoles develop in streams.
