= Osteocephalus vasquezi =

Scientific classification
- Kingdom: Animalia
- Phylum: Chordata
- Class: Amphibia
- Order: Anura
- Family: Hylidae
- Genus: Osteocephalus
- Species: O. vasquezi

Binomial name
- Osteocephalus vasquezi Venegas, García Ayachi, Toral, Malqui, and Ron, 2023

Species of frog

Osteocephalus vasquezi is species of frog in the family Hylidae. It is endemic to Peru.

== Description ==
One adult male holotype measured 51.4 mm in snout-vent length. The skin of the frog's head is dark brown in color. The skin of the back is brown or orange-brown in color with brown marks. The dorsal surfaces of the legs are brown with darker brown bars. The lips are lighter in color. There is a small white stripe under each eye. There are some white blotches on the sides of the body. The ventral area is lighter brown with darker brown marks. The iris of the eye is dark brown in color with gold reticulations.

== Etymology ==
Scientists named this frog for Pedro Vásquez Ruesta, a Peruvian forest engineer.

== Habitat ==
Scientists found the frog in the Cordillera de Yanachaga, between 1000 and 1150 meters above sea level.

This frog has been found in one protected park, Chemillén National Park.

== Reproduction ==
The tadpoles are light copper in color with black marks. The belly is brown and slightly translucent. The iris of the eye is red. Younger tadpoles are darker in color.
