= Osteocephalus fuscifacies =

Conservation status
- Least Concern (IUCN 3.1)

Scientific classification
- Kingdom: Animalia
- Phylum: Chordata
- Class: Amphibia
- Order: Anura
- Family: Hylidae
- Genus: Osteocephalus
- Species: O. fuscifacies

Binomial name
- Osteocephalus fuscifacies Jungfer, Ron, Seipp, and Almendáriz, 2000

Species of frog

Osteocephalus fuscifacies is a species of frog in the family Hylidae endemic to Ecuador. It is known from the Napo River drainage at intermediate elevations (250–950 m (820–3,120 ft) asl). The specific name fuscifacies is derived from Latin fuscus (=tan) and facies (=face), in reference to the uniform tan-colored loreal region and the lack of a light subocular spot. Common name Napo slender-legged treefrog has been coined for this species.

== Description ==
Male Osteocephalus fuscifacies measure 35–44 mm (1.4–1.7 in) and females 52–58 mm (2.0–2.3 in) in snout–vent length. The fingers and the toes are partially webbed. The Dorsum has tan ground color, often with irregular darker tan transverse bars or blotches. The limbs are barred. The venter is light tan with creamy white granules, or completelycreamy white. The throat has some tan spots, sometimes only few and inconspicuous.

== Behavior and reproduction ==
Osteocephalus fuscifacies are nocturnal frogs. Males call from bromeliads typically higher than 7 m (23 ft) above the ground. Apparently, the eggs are laid in bromeliads and these frogs seldon descent to the ground. The arboreal lifestyle of this species makes it difficult to observe.

== Habitat and conservation ==
Osteocephalus fuscifacies occurs in tropical montane forests and Napo moist forests at elevations of 250–950 m (820–3,120 ft) above sea level; it has also been recorded from banana plantations. It is threatened by habitat loss caused by agricultural development and logging. It occurs in the Sumaco Napo-Galeras and Yasuni National Parks.
