= David C. Cannatella =

David C. Cannatella (born December 25, 1954 ) is an American herpetologist, systematist, zoologist, and professor of integrative biology at the University of Texas at Austin.

Cannatella earned a Bachelor of Science degree at the University of Southwestern Louisiana in 1976. He then studied systematics and ecology at the University of Kansas, receiving his Ph.D. under the supervision of Linda Trueb in 1985. His dissertation was on the phylogeny of primitive frogs (archaeobatrachians).

From 1986 to 1988, he completed postdoctoral studies under the supervision of David B. Wake and Marvalee H. Wake at the University of California, Berkeley. From 1988 to 1990 he was an assistant professor and curator at the Museum of Natural Science and the Department of Zoology and Physiology at Louisiana State University in Baton Rouge. In 1990, he became curator at the Texas Memorial Museum at the University of Texas at Austin. From 1995 to 2000 he was a senior lecturer in the Department of Zoology at the University of Texas at Austin, and from 2001 to 2004 in the renamed Department of Integrative Biology. He was associate professor from 2005 to 2007, and since 2007, he has been a full professor in the department. In 2023, he was named department chair of the Department of Integrative Biology.

Cannatella was president of the American Society of Ichthyologists and Herpetologists in 2002-2003 and president of the Society of Systematic Biologists in 2004–2005. In 2011–2012, he did research as a Fulbright Scholar in Brazil.

Cannatella is a contributor to the Tree of Life Web Project, where he writes about the superorder Salientia.

== Research interests ==
Cannatella's lab studies a wide range of topics, but all linked by a model-clade perspective of amphibians. Topics include

- Mimicry, diet specialization, and origins of defense in Poison Frogs
- Systematics, phylogeography, and biodiversity of Neotropical frogs
- Evolution of acoustic communication
- Ecophysiology of thermoregulation and reflectance
- Evolution of early birds
- Phylogenomics of amphibians
- Timetree calibrations based on frog fossils
- Species delimitation in spring and cave salamanders (Eurycea)
- Evolutionary patterns in morphological traits

== First descriptions of taxa by Cannatella ==
Cannatella is credited with the first descriptions of the following taxa:

- Atelopus lynchi
- Atelopus peruensis
- Cochranella bejaranoi
- Cochranella phenax
- Cochranella pluvialis
- Engystomops coloradorum
- Engystomops guayaco
- Engystomops montubio
- Engystomops randi
- Frostius pernambucensis
- Hyalinobatrachium bergeri
- Hylomantis psilopygion
- Hypodactylus lucida
- Lynchius nebulanastes
- Osornophryne talipes
- Phyllomedusa atelopoides
- Phyllomedusa duellmani
- Phyllomedusa ecuatoriana
- Pristimantis achuar
- Pristimantis altamnis
- Pristimantis kichwarum
- Pseudacris fouquettei
- Truebella
- Truebella skoptes
- Truebella tothastes

== Honors ==
In 2012, the frog species Aromobates cannatellai and Osteocephalus cannatellai were named after Cannatella. The species Hypotdactylus lucida and Osornophryne talipes, described by Cannatella in 1984 and 1986 respectively have the trivial names "Cannatella's Andes Frog" and "Cannatella's Plump Toad".
