= Osteocephalus duellmani =

Scientific classification
- Kingdom: Animalia
- Phylum: Chordata
- Class: Amphibia
- Order: Anura
- Family: Hylidae
- Genus: Osteocephalus
- Species: O. duellmani

Binomial name
- Osteocephalus duellmani Jungfer, 2011

Species of frog

Osteocephalus duellmani is a frog in the family Hylidae endemic to Ecuador. Scientists know it exclusively from its type locality in the Cordillera del Cóndor. It was located 1910 meters above sea level.

The sole adult male sample measured 48.1 mm long in snout-vent length.

This frog lives in dense cloud forests with high humidity. The area was full of trees covered in moss and epiphytes.

== Original description ==
- Jungfer, Karl-Heinz (2011). "A new tree frog of the genus Osteocephalus from high altitudes in the Cordillera del Condor, Ecuador (Amphibia:Anura:Hylidae)". Herpetological Journal. 21: 247–253.
