= Osteocephalus leoniae =

Conservation status
- Least Concern (IUCN 3.1)

Scientific classification
- Kingdom: Animalia
- Phylum: Chordata
- Class: Amphibia
- Order: Anura
- Family: Hylidae
- Genus: Osteocephalus
- Species: O. leoniae

Binomial name
- Osteocephalus leoniae Jungfer & Lehr, 2001

Species of amphibian

Osteocephalus leoniae is a species of frogs in the family Hylidae.

It is endemic to Peru. Its natural habitat is subtropical or tropical moist lowland forests.
