= Nymphargus phenax =

Conservation status
- Endangered (IUCN 3.1)

Scientific classification
- Kingdom: Animalia
- Phylum: Chordata
- Class: Amphibia
- Order: Anura
- Family: Centrolenidae
- Genus: Nymphargus
- Species: N. phenax

Binomial name
- Nymphargus phenax (Cannatella & Duellman, 1982)

Synonyms
- Cochranella phenax

Species of frog

Nymphargus phenax is a species of frog in the family Centrolenidae, formerly placed in Cochranella. It is endemic to Peru. Its natural habitats are subtropical or tropical moist montane forests and rivers.
