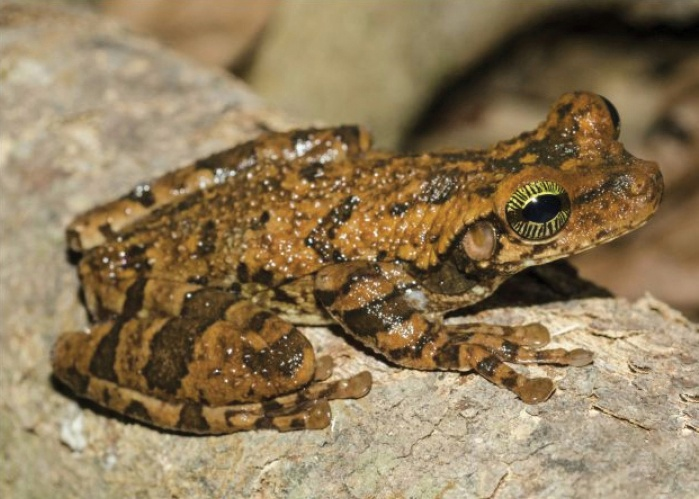
- Osteocephalus taurinus

Scientific classification
- Kingdom: Animalia
- Phylum: Chordata
- Class: Amphibia
- Order: Anura
- Family: Hylidae
- Subfamily: Lophyohylinae
- Genus: Osteocephalus; Steindachner, 1862

Species
- 26, see text.

= Slender-legged tree frog =

Genus of amphibians

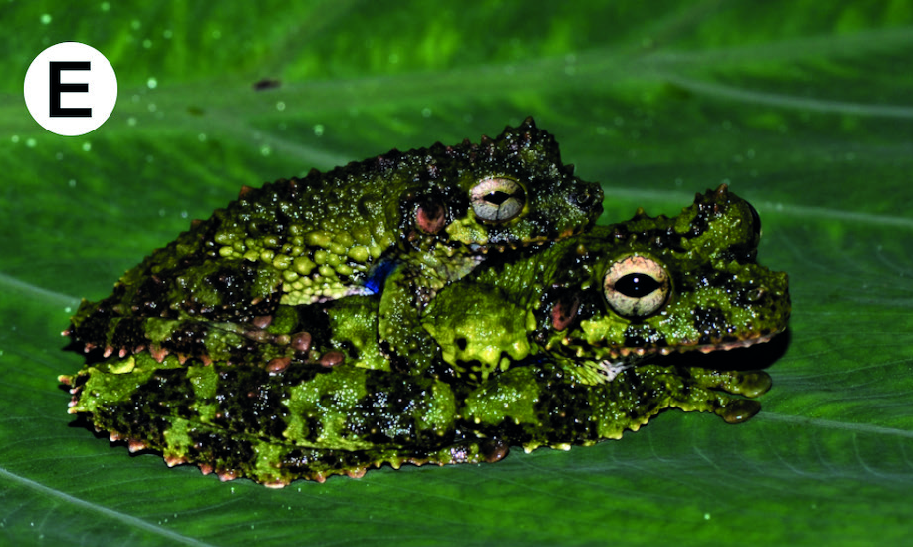
Osteocephalus cabrerai

Osteocephalus is a genus of frogs, commonly called the slender-legged tree frogs, in the family Hylidae. Species in the genus are found in the Guianas, the Amazon Basin, Venezuela, Colombia, southeastern Brazil, and north-eastern Argentina. Males are warty, while females are smooth.

== Species ==
There are 26 described species in Osteocephalus:

- O. alboguttatus (Boulenger, 1882)
- O. buckleyi (Boulenger, 1882) — Buckley's slender-legged tree frog
- O. cabrerai (Cochran & Goin, 1970)
- O. camufatus (Jungfer, Verdade, Faivovich & Rodrigues, 2016)
- O. cannatellai (Ron, Venegas, Toral, Read, Ortiz & Manzano, 2012)
- O. carri (Cochran & Goin, 1970)
- O. castaneicola (Moravec, Aparicio, Guerrero-Reinhard, Calderón, Jungfer & Gvoždík, 2009)
- O. deridens (Jungfer, Ron, Seipp & Almendáriz, 2000)
- O. duellmani (Jungfer, 2011)
- O. festae (Peracca, 1904)
- O. fuscifacies (Jungfer, Ron, Seipp & Almendáriz, 2000)
- O. helenae (Ruthven, 1919)
- O. heyeri (Lynch, 2002)
- O. leoniae (Jungfer & Lehr, 2001)
- O. leprieurii (A.M.C. Duméril & Bibron, 1841) — Cayenne slender-legged tree frog
- O. mimeticus (Melin, 1941)
- O. mutabor (Jungfer & Hödl, 2002)
- O. oophagus (Jungfer & Schiesari, 1995)
- O. planiceps (Cope, 1874)
- O. sangay (Chasiluisa, Caminer, Varela-Jaramillo & Ron, 2020) — Sangay casqued tree frog
- O. subtilis (Martins & Cardoso, 1987) — Brazilian slender-legged tree frog
- O. taurinus (Steindachner, 1862) — Manaus slender-legged tree frog
- O. vasquezi (Venegas, García-Ayachi, Toral, Malqui & Ron, 2023)
- O. verruciger (Werner, 1901) — Ecuador slender-legged tree frog
- O. vilarsi (Melin, 1941)
- O. yasuni (Ron & Pramuk, 1999)
