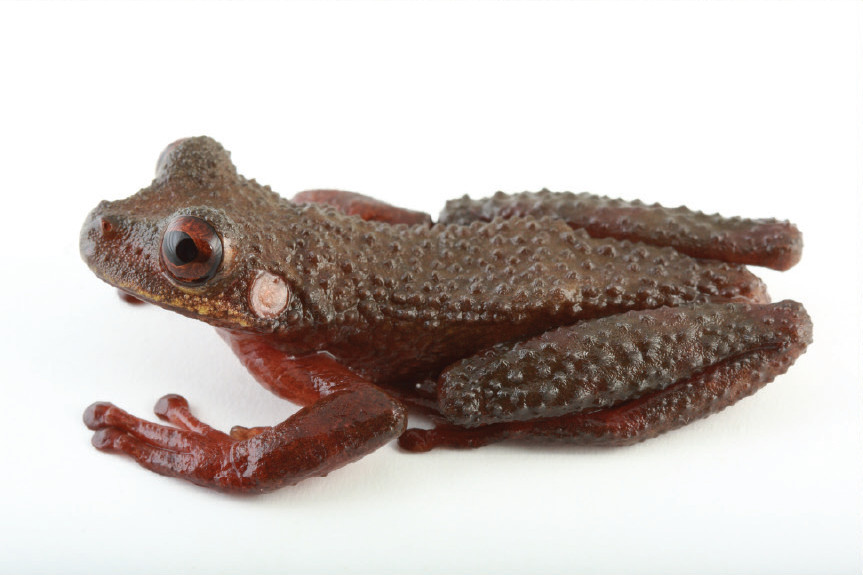

Conservation status
- Least Concern (IUCN 3.1)

Scientific classification
- Kingdom: Animalia
- Phylum: Chordata
- Class: Amphibia
- Order: Anura
- Family: Hylidae
- Genus: Osteocephalus
- Species: O. verruciger

Binomial name
- Osteocephalus verruciger (Werner, 1901)

Synonyms
- Hyla verrucigera Werner, 1901; Hyla riopastazae Andersson, 1945; Hyla orcesi Funkhouser, 1956; Osteocephalus orcesi Cochran and Goin, 1970; Osteocephalus verrucigerus Trueb and Duellman, 1970; Osteocephalus verruciger Duellman, 1985

= Ecuador slender-legged tree frog =

Species of amphibian

The Ecuador slender-legged tree frog (Osteocephalus verruciger) is a species of frog in the family Hylidae found in Colombia and Ecuador. Its natural habitats are subtropical or tropical moist lowland forests, subtropical or tropical moist montane forests, rivers, intermittent freshwater marshes, rural gardens, and heavily degraded former forests.

The adult male frog measures 44.3–53.9 mm long in snout-vent length and the adult female frog 45.5–70.0 mm. The male frog has olive colored dorsal skin and the female frog dark brown. The groin and the upper front legs are dark brown. There is dark red-brown color on the feet. The throat is cream in color. The belly is red-bronze in color with dark brown marks.
