= Callimedusa duellmani =

Conservation status
- Data Deficient (IUCN 3.1) (Cannatella, 1982)

Scientific classification
- Kingdom: Animalia
- Phylum: Chordata
- Class: Amphibia
- Order: Anura
- Family: Phyllomedusidae
- Genus: Callimedusa
- Species: C. duellmani

Binomial name
- Callimedusa duellmani (Cannatella, 1982)
- Callimedusa duellmani is only known from near Balzapata in Peru

Synonyms
- Phyllomedusa duellmani Cannatella, 1982

Species of frog

Callimedusa duellmani is a species of frog in the subfamily Phyllomedusinae. It is endemic to Peru and is only known from its type locality near Balzapata, upper Chiriaco River, in the Department of Amazonas. The specific name duellmani honors William E. Duellman, an American herpetologist. Common name purple and orange leaf frog (also spelled purple-and-orange leaf frog) has been proposed for it.

== Description ==
The type series consists of two adult males measuring 52 and 54 mm (2.0 and 2.1 in) in snout–vent length. The snout is short and acutely rounded in dorsal view, sloping when viewed laterally. The tympanum is distinct. The fingers have discs of moderate size but no webbing. The toes have discs that are slightly longer than the finger ones; webbing is absent. Dorsal coloration is green. The concealed surfaces of the limbs are deep orange with purple markings. The throat and belly are orange, with purple between white granules that are prominent on the throat. The iris is silvery gray with greenish cast; the palpebrum has light white reticulation.

Gosner stage 37 tadpole measures 53 mm (2.1 in) in total length; the body length is 23 mm (0.9 in).

== Habitat and conservation ==
Callimedusa duellmani is known from cloud forest at elevations of 1,850–1,910 m (6,070–6,270 ft) above sea level. The type series was collected at night on vegetation overhanging a water-filled ditch along a road. The males were calling at the time of the capture. Eggs clutches were found in vegetation about one meter above the ditch, and tadpoles in the ditch.

Potential threat to this poorly known species is agricultural activity in the area of the type locality. It is not known if it occurs in any protected areas.
