= Nymphargus bejaranoi =

Conservation status
- Endangered (IUCN 3.1)

Scientific classification
- Kingdom: Animalia
- Phylum: Chordata
- Class: Amphibia
- Order: Anura
- Family: Centrolenidae
- Genus: Nymphargus
- Species: N. bejaranoi

Binomial name
- Nymphargus bejaranoi (Cannatella, 1980)

Synonyms
- Centrolenella bejaranoi Cannatella, 1980; Cochranella bejaranoi (Cannatella, 1980); Centrolenella flavidigitata Reynolds and Foster, 1992; Cochranella flavidigitata (Reynolds and Foster, 1992)

Species of amphibian

Nymphargus bejaranoi is a species of frog in the family Centrolenidae. It is endemic to the eastern slopes of the Bolivian Andes in the Cochabamba, Chuquisaca, La Paz, and Santa Cruz departments. The specific name bejaranoi honors Gastón Bejarano, a Bolivian zoologist and Director of Forestry and National Parks, Ministry of Agriculture. Common name Bolivian Cochran frog has been coined for this species.

== Description ==
Adult males measure 23.6–24.4 mm (0.9–1.0 in) and adult females about 26.5 mm (1.04 in) in snout–vent length, the latter being based on the holotype of Centrolenella flavidigitata, later identified as the first female of Nymphargus bejaranoi. The snout is short and truncate or rounded in dorsal view and truncate or sloping in lateral profile. The eyes are moderately large. The tympanum is distinct but its upper part is concealed by the supra-tympanic fold. The fingers have broad discs and some webbing between the last two fingers. The toes are about one-half webbed and have discs that are slightly smaller than those on the fingers. Males in reproductive state have the dorsum covered by spicules. The dorsum is dark green; the spicules appear off-white in living specimens.

== Habitat and conservation ==
Nymphargus bejaranoi live in wet montane forest, including cloud forest and Yungas forest, at elevations of 1,600–2,400 m (5,200–7,900 ft) above sea level. It is an arboreal species found in vegetation close to streams and small waterfalls. It was formerly a common species, has massively decline as its habitat has become threatened by agricultural development and pollution as well as the development of roads. Its range includes several national parks.

Being ranked as "endangered" on the IUCN Red List, it is now incredibly rare. After a sighting in 2002, it was not seen for over 18 years. It was rediscovered in 2020 in Carrasco National Park during a mission to rescue reptiles and amphibians whose habitat would be threatened by a planned hydroelectric project. Three frogs were taken to an amphibian conservation center for the purpose of captive breeding.
