= Brazilian slender-legged tree frog =

Conservation status
- Least Concern (IUCN 3.1)

Scientific classification
- Kingdom: Animalia
- Phylum: Chordata
- Class: Amphibia
- Order: Anura
- Family: Hylidae
- Genus: Osteocephalus
- Species: O. subtilis

Binomial name
- Osteocephalus subtilis Martins & Cardoso, 1987.

Species of amphibian

The Brazilian slender-legged tree frog (Osteocephalus subtilis) is a species of frog in the family Hylidae found in Brazil and possibly Bolivia and Peru. Its natural habitat is subtropical or tropical moist lowland forests. It is threatened by habitat loss.

Scientists have observed this frog sitting on plants 1–2 m above the ground.

This frog is brown in color with brown or red transverse stripes across its back. Its eyes are prominent with a white supraorbital mark.
