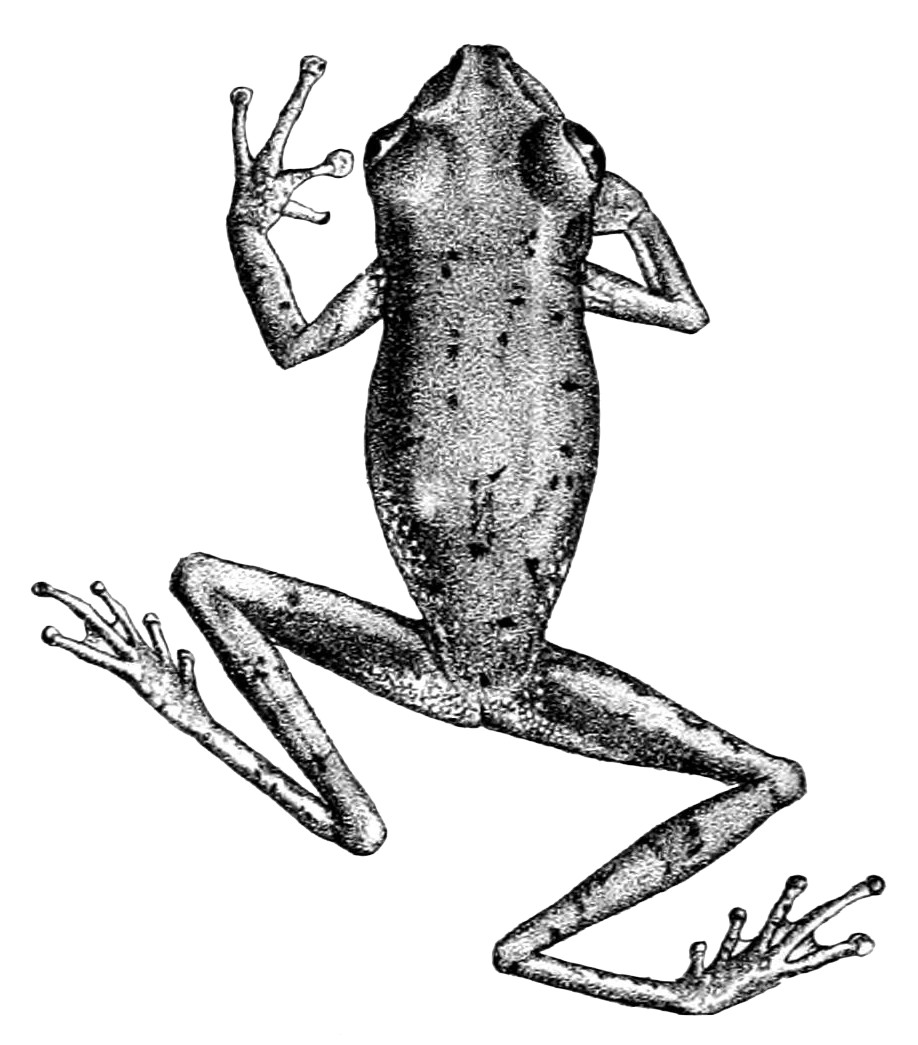

Conservation status
- Least Concern (IUCN 3.1)

Scientific classification
- Kingdom: Animalia
- Phylum: Chordata
- Class: Amphibia
- Order: Anura
- Family: Hylidae
- Genus: Osteocephalus
- Species: O. alboguttatus

Binomial name
- Osteocephalus alboguttatus (Boulenger, 1882)

Synonyms
- Hyla alboguttata Boulenger, 1882

= Whitebelly tree frog =

Species of amphibian

The whitebelly tree frog (Osteocephalus alboguttatus) is a species of frog in the family Hylidae found in Ecuador and possibly Colombia and Peru. Its natural habitats are tropical and subtropical moist lowland forests, swamps, intermittent freshwater marshes, plantations, rural gardens, and heavily degraded former forests. It is threatened by habitat loss.
