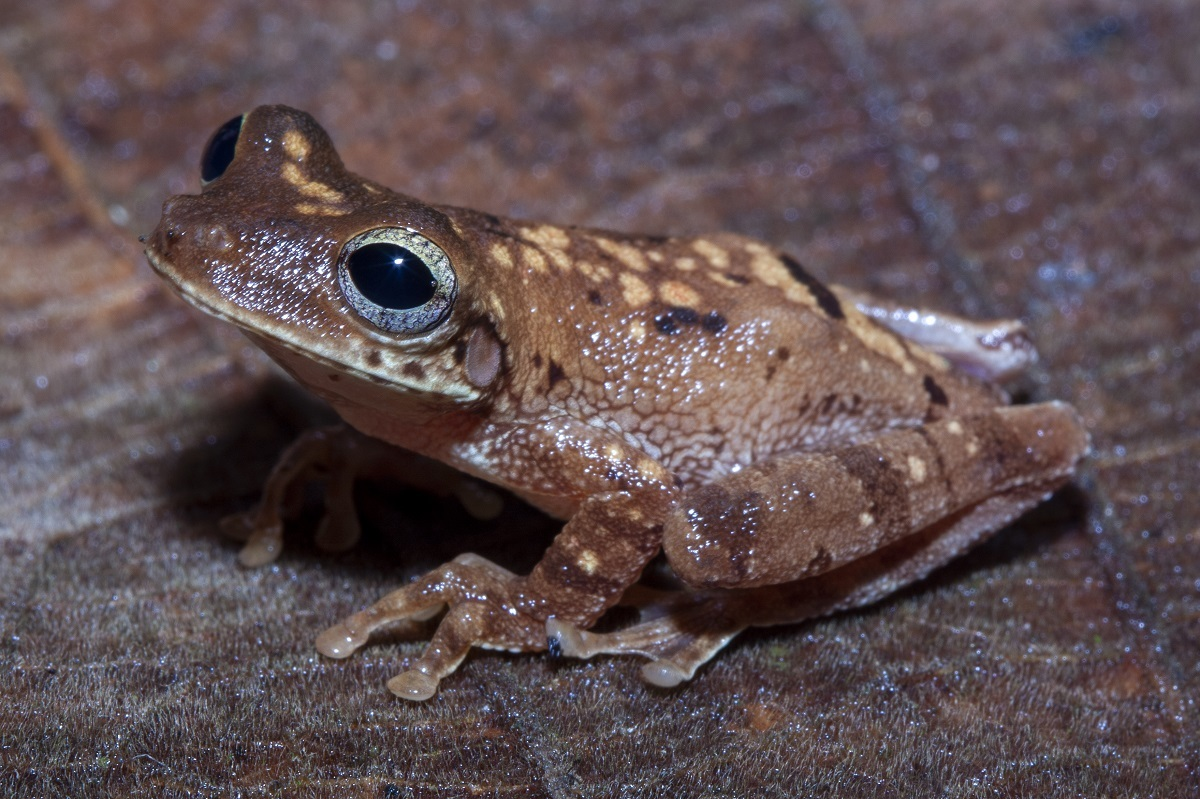

Conservation status
- Least Concern (IUCN 3.1)

Scientific classification
- Kingdom: Animalia
- Phylum: Chordata
- Class: Amphibia
- Order: Anura
- Family: Hylidae
- Genus: Osteocephalus
- Species: O. deridens

Binomial name
- Osteocephalus deridens Jungfer, Ron, Seipp, and Almendáriz, 2000

= Osteocephalus deridens =

Species of frog

Osteocephalus deridens is a species of frog in the family Hylidae. It is found in the Napo and Pastaza River drainages in eastern Ecuador and in the Loreto Region, northern Peru. The specific name deridens is derived from Latin deridere, meaning "make fun of someone". This alludes to the males calling from the treetops that sound "as if they are laughing at the collectors' vain attempts to reach them". Common name funny slender-legged treefrog has been coined for this species.

== Description ==
Adult males measure 29–35 mm (1.1–1.4 in) and adult females 44–51 mm (1.7–2.0 in) in snout–vent length. The snout is rounded in profile and truncate in dorsal view. The tympanum is conspicuous but partly cover by the supratympanic fold. The fingers and the toes are partially webbed. The dorsum is dark tan, with variable markings (irregular dark tan blotches, suffusions of dark tan, irregular light brown spots or flecks, or light brown backward-pointing triangle). The limbs have dark crossbars. The lower surfaces are creamy white.

== Habitat and conservation ==
Osteocephalus deridens inhabits Napo moist forests at elevations of 200–600 m (660–1,970 ft) above sea level. It occurs in the canopy of primary forest. Males call usually higher than 5 m (16 ft) above the ground, and the tadpoles develop in bromeliads, often higher than 15 m (49 ft) above the ground.

This species is difficult to observe because of its arboreal lifestyle. It does not adapt well to anthropogenic disturbance and is threatened by habitat loss caused by agriculture and logging. It occurs in the Yasuni National Park (Ecuador).
