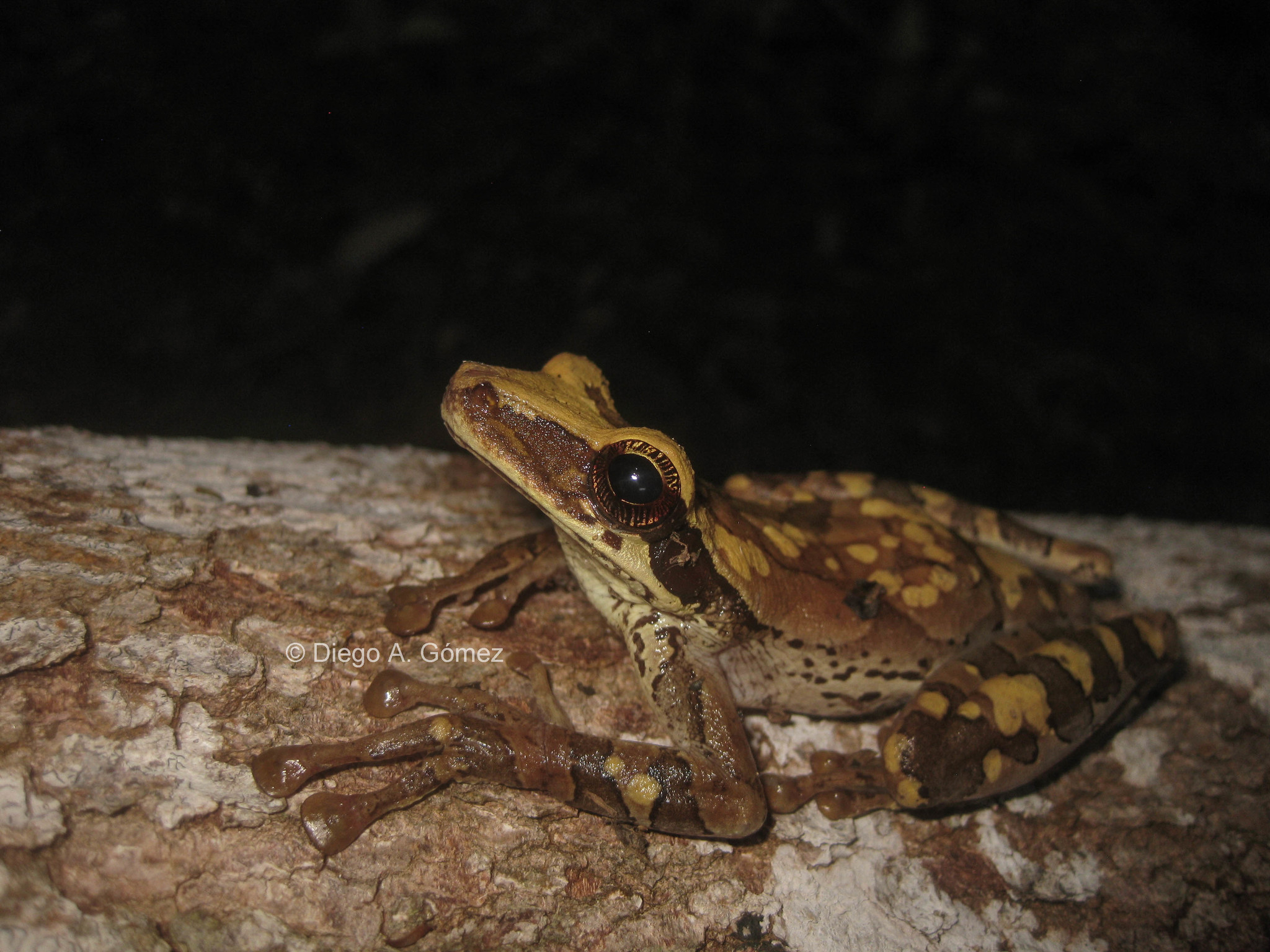
- In Puerto Narino, Colombia

Conservation status
- Least Concern (IUCN 3.1)

Scientific classification
- Kingdom: Animalia
- Phylum: Chordata
- Class: Amphibia
- Order: Anura
- Family: Hylidae
- Genus: Osteocephalus
- Species: O. planiceps

Binomial name
- Osteocephalus planiceps Cope, 1874

= Osteocephalus planiceps =

Species of frog

Osteocephalus planiceps is a species of frog in the family Hylidae found in Colombia, Ecuador, Peru, and possibly Brazil. Its natural habitat is subtropical or tropical moist lowland forests. It is threatened by habitat loss.
