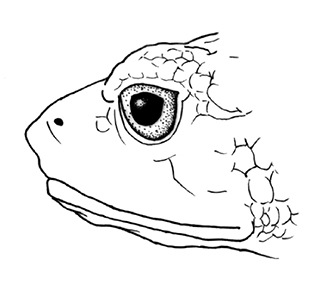
- Head shape in lateral view of female Osornophryne talipe.

Conservation status
- Vulnerable (IUCN 3.1)

Scientific classification
- Kingdom: Animalia
- Phylum: Chordata
- Class: Amphibia
- Order: Anura
- Family: Bufonidae
- Genus: Osornophryne
- Species: O. talipes

Binomial name
- Osornophryne talipes Cannatella, 1986

= Cannatella's plump toad =

Species of amphibian

The Cannatella's plump toad (Osornophryne talipes) is a species of toad in the family Bufonidae. It is found in Colombia and Ecuador. Its natural habitats are subtropical or tropical moist montane forests and subtropical or tropical high-altitude shrubland. It is threatened by habitat loss.
