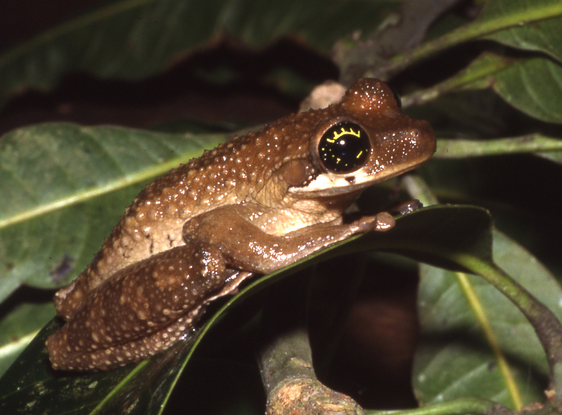

Conservation status
- Least Concern (IUCN 3.1)

Scientific classification
- Kingdom: Animalia
- Phylum: Chordata
- Class: Amphibia
- Order: Anura
- Family: Hylidae
- Genus: Osteocephalus
- Species: O. mimeticus

Binomial name
- Osteocephalus mimeticus (Melin, 1941)

Synonyms
- Hyla mimetica Melin, 1941; Osteocephalus elkejungingerae (Henle, 1981)

= Henle's slender-legged tree frog =

Species of amphibian

Henle's slender-legged tree frog (Osteocephalus mimeticus) is a species of frog in the family Hylidae. It is found in Peru and northeastern Bolivia. It occurs in lowland, premontane, and montane forest at elevations of 300–1,100 m (980–3,610 ft) above sea level. Breeding takes place in small streams where the tadpoles develop. It is a locally abundant species that can be threatened by habitat loss in parts of its range.
