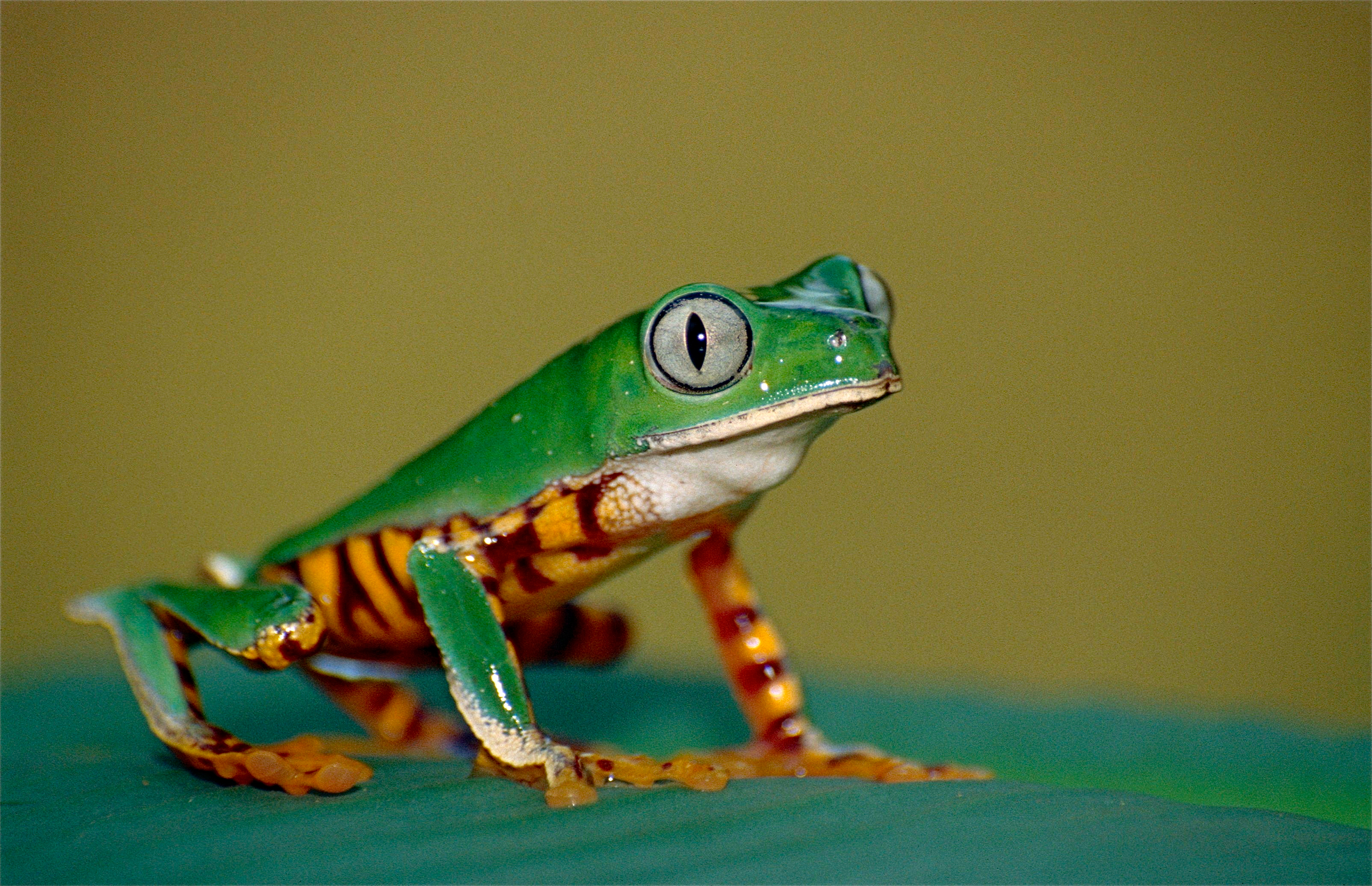
- Callimedusa tomopterna

Scientific classification
- Kingdom: Animalia
- Phylum: Chordata
- Class: Amphibia
- Order: Anura
- Family: Phyllomedusidae
- Genus: Callimedusa; Duellman, Marion & Hedges, 2016

= Callimedusa =

Genus of amphibians

Callimedusa is a genus of frogs belonging to the subfamily Phyllomedusinae.

== Distribution ==
The species of this genus are found in South America.

== Species ==
The following species are recognised in the genus Callimedusa :

- Callimedusa atelopoides (Duellman, Cadle & Cannatella, 1988)
- Callimedusa baltea (Duellman & Toft, 1979)
- Callimedusa duellmani (Cannatella, 1982)
- Callimedusa ecuatoriana (Cannatella, 1982)
- Callimedusa perinesos (Duellman, 1973)
- Callimedusa tomopterna (Cope, 1868)
