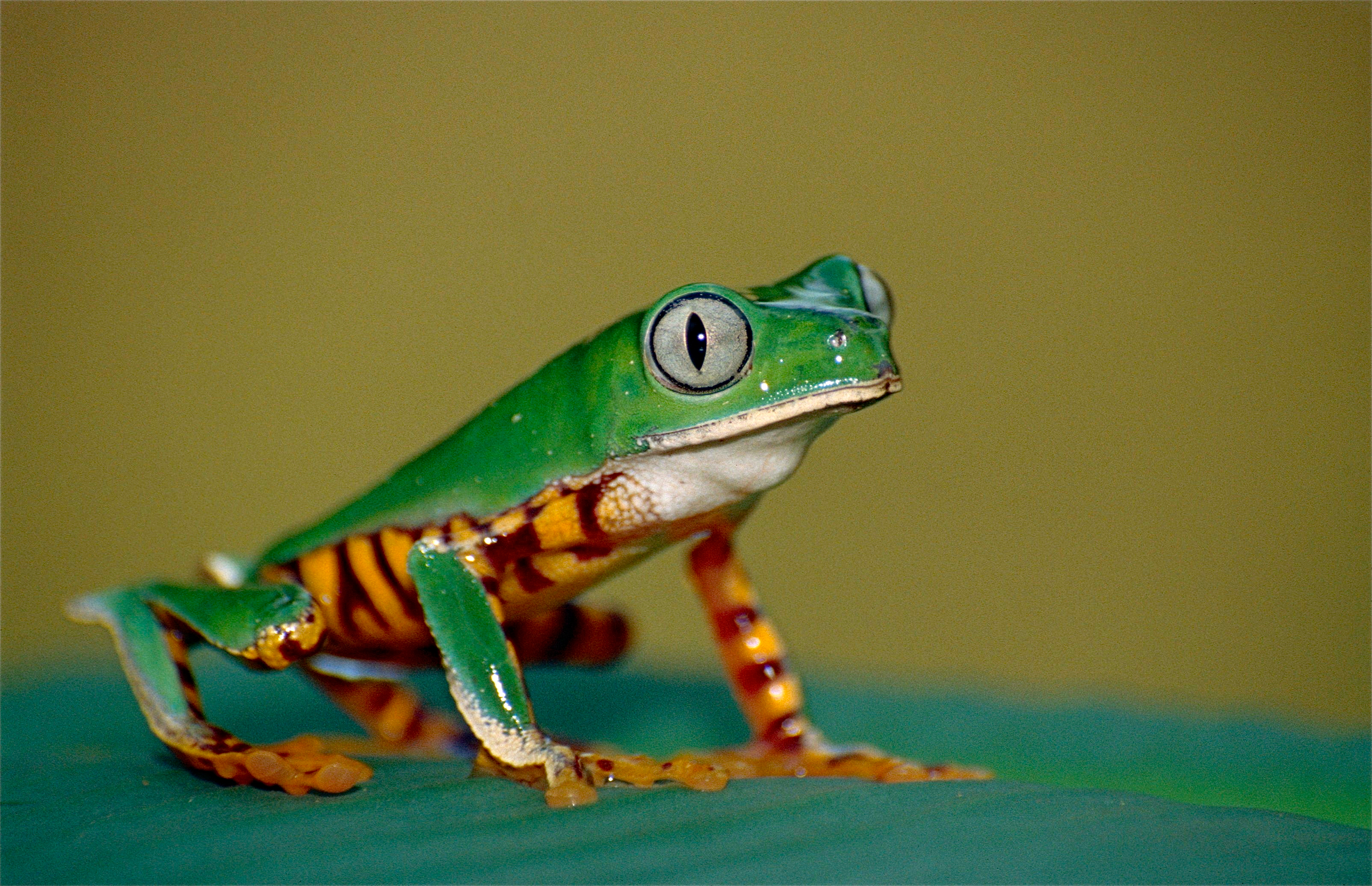

Conservation status
- Least Concern (IUCN 3.1)

Scientific classification
- Kingdom: Animalia
- Phylum: Chordata
- Class: Amphibia
- Order: Anura
- Family: Phyllomedusidae
- Genus: Callimedusa
- Species: C. tomopterna

Binomial name
- Callimedusa tomopterna (Cope, 1868)

Synonyms
- Pithecopus tomopternus Cope, 1868; Pithecopus tomopterma Cope, 1868; Phyllomedusa tomopterna (Cope, 1868)

= Callimedusa tomopterna =

Species of frog

The tiger-striped tree frog, also called barred monkey frog and barred leaf frog, is a species of frog in the subfamily Phyllomedusinae. It is found in northern South America in the Upper Amazon Basin of Bolivia, Peru, Ecuador, and Colombia, Amazonian Brazil, and the Guianas from southeastern Venezuela to French Guiana. It might represent more than one species.

== Appearance ==
Adult males measure 44 mm (1.7 in) to 54 mm (2.1 in) in snout-vent length while adult female are larger at 60 mm (2.4 in). Its skin is green with orange pigmentation on the flanks and legs. The irises are silver or gray in color.

== Habitat ==
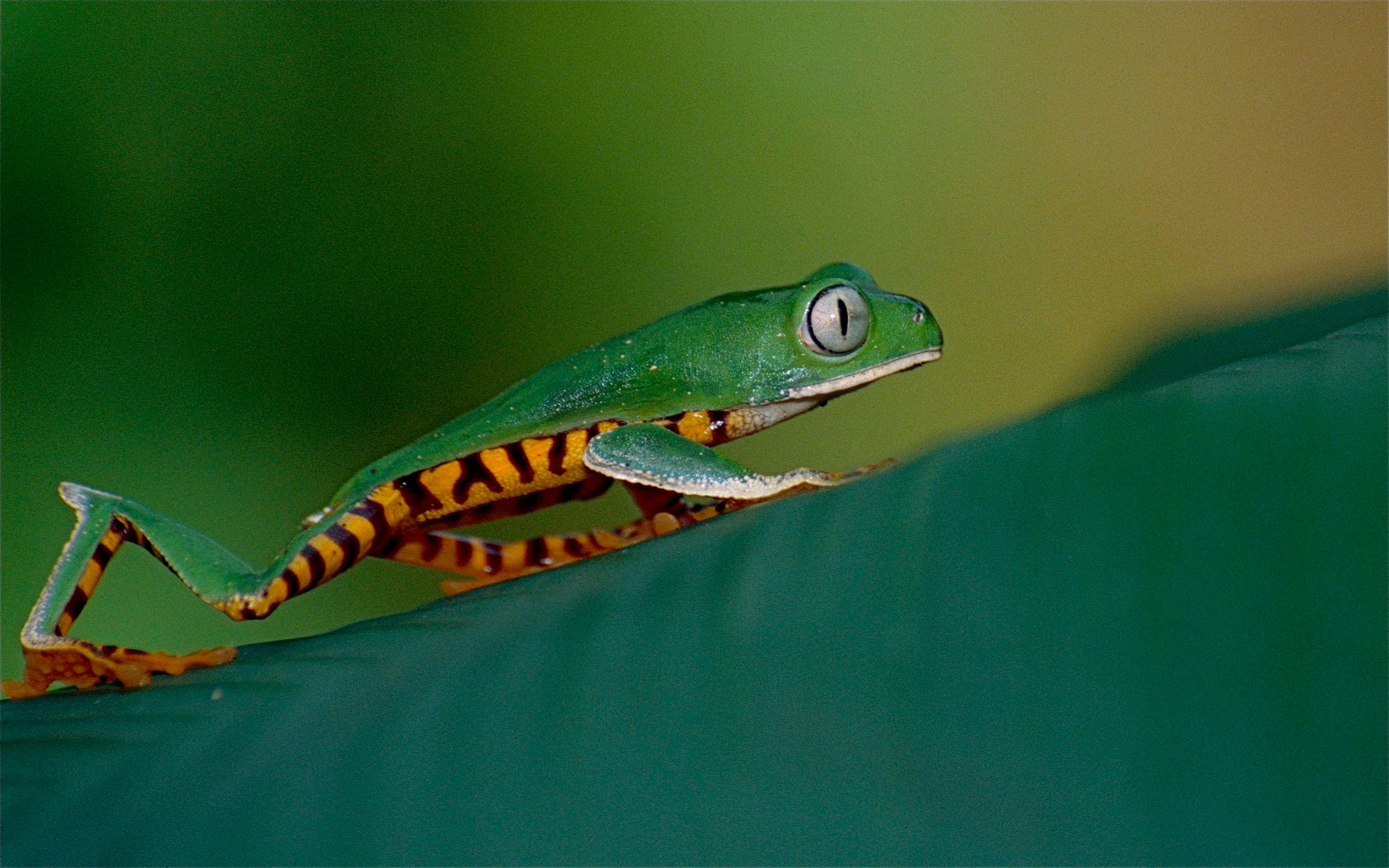
Tiger-striped tree frog

The tiger-striped tree frog is an arboreal species that occurs in pristine tropical rainforests, usually on trees around temporary to semi-temporary pools during the wet season, but specimens have been also collected in open areas and floodable forests on shrubs and aquatic edges.

It occurs at elevations up to 500 m (1,600 ft) above sea level. It is an uncommon species in most parts of its range. It can locally suffer from habitat loss.

== Behaviour and reproduction ==
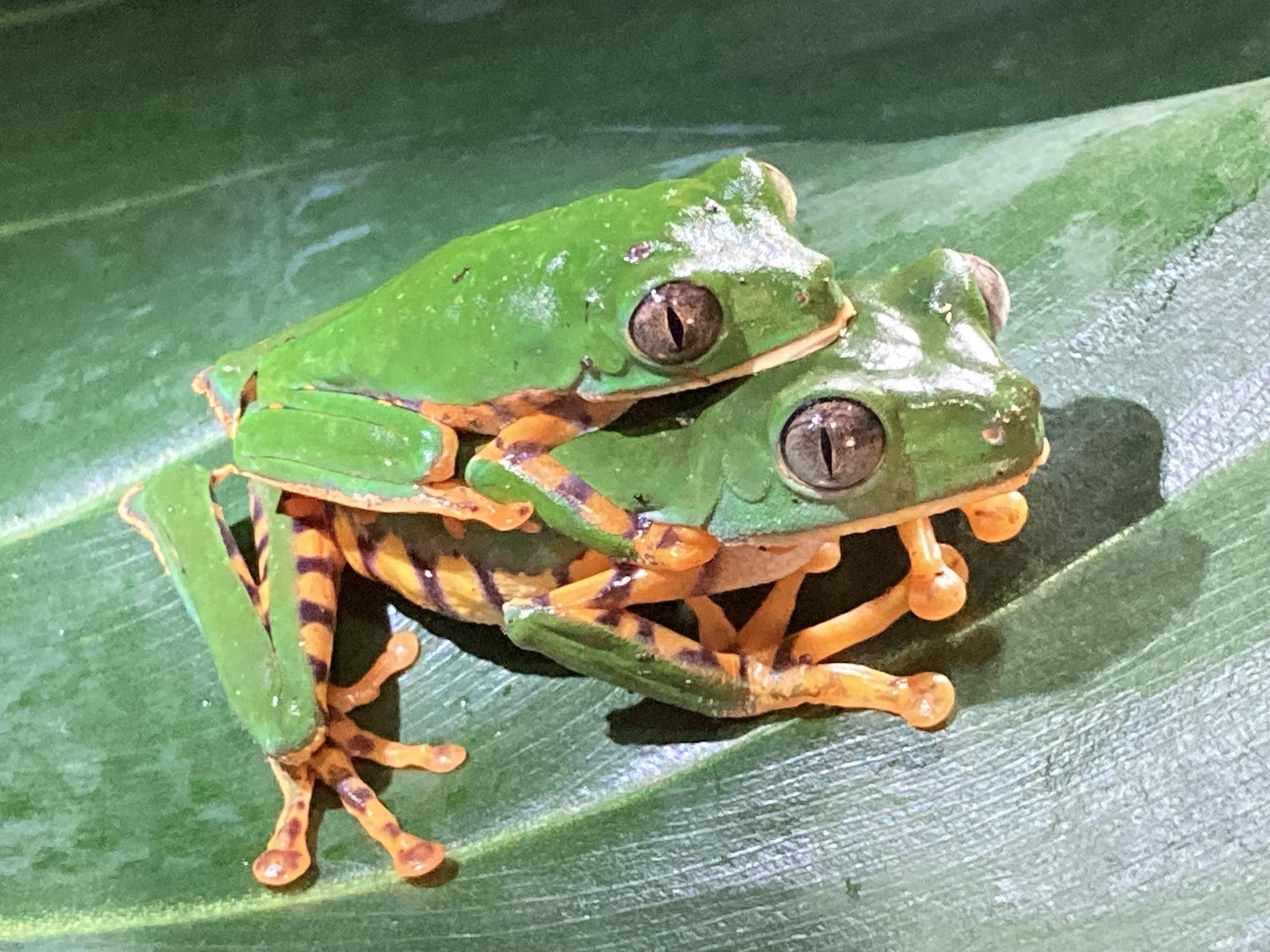
Amplexus

Tiger-striped tree frogs are nocturnal and sleep throughout the day. At night, males are able to communicate to females through vocal calls. Nighttime is also when they search for food. The reproductive aspects reported for the species of this family are marked by the uniqueness of egg deposition, placed on green leaves hanging under standing water, where the tadpoles will complete their development. The lack of availability of sites for reproduction can lead to sites being shared by different frog species, which can sometimes lead to interspecific mating. This is especially seen when males are actively looking for females through satellite behaviour or have limited capacity to differentiate between sexes. This is an often-common behaviour in many neotropical frogs such as the tiger-striped tree frog. Studies have shown interspecific amplexus between individuals from two different species: specifically, Callimedusa tomopterna (tiger-striped tree frog) and Dendropsophus minutus (lesser treefrog).

=== Threats ===
Clutch Predation

In the Central Amazonia, tree frogs of the genus Phyllomedusa lay their eggs in gelatinous masses on leaves and branches over water. 59% of tiger-striped tree frog clutches are often attacked by predators such as phorid flies (being the majorly responsible for clutch loss), and other unidentified predators. The reason for these clutch predations is mostly due to Anuran eggs being a high-protein energy source for many predators such as insects. They are especially notorious for larvae.

Adult Predation

Adult tiger-striped tree frogs are also highly predated on. Studies have shown that the predation of adult Phyllomedusa tree frogs by the snake species, Leptodeira annulata (cat-eyed snake) reinforces the claim that the toxins that tiger-striped tree frogs are able to secrete for defence are insufficient to protect them from the cat-eyed snakes.
