= Truebella tothastes =

Conservation status
- Endangered (IUCN 3.1)

Scientific classification
- Kingdom: Animalia
- Phylum: Chordata
- Class: Amphibia
- Order: Anura
- Family: Bufonidae
- Genus: Truebella
- Species: T. tothastes

Binomial name
- Truebella tothastes Graybeal and Cannatella, 1995

Species of amphibian

Truebella tothastes is a species of toad in the family Bufonidae. It is endemic to Ayacucho Region in the Cordillera Oriental of central Peru and is only known from a few locations west of the Apurímac River. The specific name tothastes is a Greek noun meaning "one who scorns" and refers to the enigmatic position of the genus Truebella within the bufonids.

== Description ==
Adult males measure 26–30 mm (1.0–1.2 in) and adult females, based on a single specimen only, 37 mm (1.5 in) in snout–vent length. A smaller female (29 mm (1.1 in) SVL) was not mature. The snout is pointed in dorsal view and acutely rounded and protruding in lateral view. The canthus rostralis is sharp. Tympanum is absent. The arms are robust and the fingers are short, with slightly bulbous tips but no terminal discs; webbing is absent. The legs are short and stocky. The toes have slightly bulbous tips but no terminal discs; webbing is thick and fleshy, barely discernible. Skin has many warts dorsally but parotoid glands are absent. Coloration is variable; preserved specimens are mostly uniformly dark chocolate brown dorsally, but a mid-dorsal stripe, and sometimes, even dorsalateral stripes, may be present. The belly is mottled.

== Habitat and conservation ==
Truebella tothastes occurs in leaf litter of riparian cloud forests at elevations of 2,200–2,440 m (7,220–8,010 ft) above sea level. Its breeding habits are unknown.

Truebella tothastes is an uncommon species. It is threatened by habitat loss caused by agriculture and by increased fire frequency. It is not known to occur in any protected areas.
