= Osteocephalus festae =

Scientific classification
- Kingdom: Animalia
- Phylum: Chordata
- Class: Amphibia
- Order: Anura
- Family: Hylidae
- Genus: Osteocephalus
- Species: O. festae

Binomial name
- Osteocephalus festae (Peracca, 1904)

Synonyms
- Hyla festae Peracca, 1904; Osteocephalus festae Jungfer, 2010

Species of frog

Osteocephalus festae is a frog in the family Hylidae endemic to Ecuador and Peru. Scientists have seen it between 1000 and 2200 meters above sea level.

The adult male frog measures 38.3 to 56.1 mm in snout-vent length and the adult female frog 49.5–84.9 mm. The adult frog is brown in color, and some individuals have black marks. It has cream-colored lines on its lips and a light mark under each eye.

This frog lives near rivers and streams with fast-flowing water and waterfalls. Its habitats include forests, farms, and other areas. The tadpoles are found in pools on the sides of these rivers. The adult frogs sit on plants 40–250 cm above the ground.

This frog's scientific name festae is for Italian naturalist Enrico Festa, who collected the holotype for this species.
