= Osteocephalus vilarsi =

Scientific classification
- Kingdom: Animalia
- Phylum: Chordata
- Class: Amphibia
- Order: Anura
- Family: Hylidae
- Genus: Osteocephalus
- Species: O. vilarsi

Binomial name
- Osteocephalus vilarsi (Melin, 1941)

Synonyms
- Hyla (Trachycephalus) vilarsi Melin, 1941; Osteocephalus mimeticus Jungfer, 2010

Species of frog

Osteocephalus vilarsi is a frog in the family Hylidae endemic to the state of Amazonas in Brazil and the state of Amazonas in Venezuela. Scientists think it might also live in Colombia. This frog lives in white-sand forests.

== Morphology ==
The adult male measures 47.5 – 58.4 mm in snout-vent length and the adult female frog 54.6 – 65.3 m. Adult male frogs have many large tubercules on their skin and adult female frogs have fewer, smaller tubercules. The adult frog is light brown, yellow-brown, or red-brown on the back. Some of them have dark brown or black marks. There is a dark interorbital stripe and canthal stripe. There is a dark line by each side of the jaw. The sides of the body are yellow-white and might have brown spots or marks. The inner parts of the hind legs are light brown. The belly is whitish in color. The lower sides of the legs are pink or orange in color.

Metamorph frogs are gray in color with darker gray marks. There is a gray stripe between the eyes.

The tadpoles are 33.0 – 34.5 mm long from nose to the end of the tail.

== Conservation ==
This frog is threatened by habitat loss from logging and other clearing. Because this frog only lives in forests with white sand, it is more vulnerable to habitat loss than other frogs.

== Original publication ==
- Jungfer Karl-Heinz (2010). "The taxonomic status of some spiny-backed treefrogs, genus Osteocephalus (Amphibia: Anura: Hylidae)". Zootaxa (Abstract). 2407: 28–50. doi:10.11646/zootaxa.2407.1.2.
