= Osteocephalus camufatus =

Scientific classification
- Kingdom: Animalia
- Phylum: Chordata
- Class: Amphibia
- Order: Anura
- Family: Hylidae
- Genus: Osteocephalus
- Species: O. camufatus

Binomial name
- Osteocephalus camufatus Jungfer, Verdade, Faivovich, and Rodrigues, 2016

Species of frog

Osteocephalus camufatus, the Rio Abacaxis spiny-backed frog, is a frog in the family Hylidae, endemic to Brazil. Scientists have seen it in two places.

The skin of the dorsum is dark green in color with irregular light brown marks. The ventrum has tan spots. The legs have dark transverse bars.
