= Osteocephalus helenae =

- Adult female

Conservation status
- Data Deficient (IUCN 3.1)

Scientific classification
- Kingdom: Animalia
- Phylum: Chordata
- Class: Amphibia
- Order: Anura
- Family: Hylidae
- Genus: Osteocephalus
- Species: O. helenae

Binomial name
- Osteocephalus helenae (Ruthven, 1919)

Synonyms
- Hyla helenae Ruthven, 1919; Osteocephalus germani Ron, Venegas, Toral, Read, Ortiz, and Manzano, 2012

Species of amphibian

Osteocephalus helenae is a species of frog in the family Hylidae. It is widely distributed in the Amazon Basin and is known from the lowlands of Bolivia, Peru, Brazil, Colombia, Venezuela, Guyana, and French Guiana. The specific name helenae honors Helen Beulah Thompson Gaige, an American herpetologist. Common name Helena's [sic] treefrog has been proposed for it.

== Taxonomy ==
Osteocephalus helenae was described in 1919 by Alexander Grant Ruthven as Hyla helenae based on three recently metamorphosed specimens. The relationships of this species were unclear and it was considered incertae sedis within Hyla, until Jungfer and colleagues concluded in 2013 that Ruthven's Hyla helenae is the same species as Osteocephalus germani described by Ron and colleagues in 2012 and that the correct name for this taxon is Osteocephalus helenae.

== Description ==
Based on the type series of Osteocephalus germani, adult males measure about 41 mm (1.6 in) and adult females about 49–51 mm (1.9–2.0 in) in snout–vent length. The snout is truncate but may sometimes be rounded in females. The tympanum is visible but partly concealed dorsally. The fingers and the toes bear large discs and are webbed, the toes more heavily so. Dorsal skin bears tubercles in males but is smooth in females. Coloration is variable, ranging dorsally from brown with dark brown marks to light gray with dark brown marks; the ventrum is light cream and may have dark brown flecks. There is a cream-colored suborbital mark. Males have a paired vocal sac.

Variation in dorsal and ventral coloration of preserved specimens

== Habitat ==
The region of the type locality of Osteocephalus helenae is lowland tropical rainforest. In Peru, this species (as Osteocephalus germani) has been collected from primary and secondary lowland forests and from premontane forest at elevations up to 725 m (2,379 ft). All specimens were encountered by temporary pools, perching over broad leaves or on tree branches 1–2 m (3 ft 3 in – 6 ft 7 in) above the ground.

== Conservation status ==
The assessment of Osteocephalus helenae for the IUCN Red List of Threatened Species in 2004 predates the current delimitation of this species.
