= Truebella skoptes =

Conservation status
- Data Deficient (IUCN 3.1)

Scientific classification
- Kingdom: Animalia
- Phylum: Chordata
- Class: Amphibia
- Order: Anura
- Family: Bufonidae
- Genus: Truebella
- Species: T. skoptes

Binomial name
- Truebella skoptes Graybeal & Cannatella, 1995

Species of amphibian

Truebella skoptes is a species of toad in the family Bufonidae. It is endemic to Peru. Its natural habitat is subtropical or tropical high-altitude grassland.
