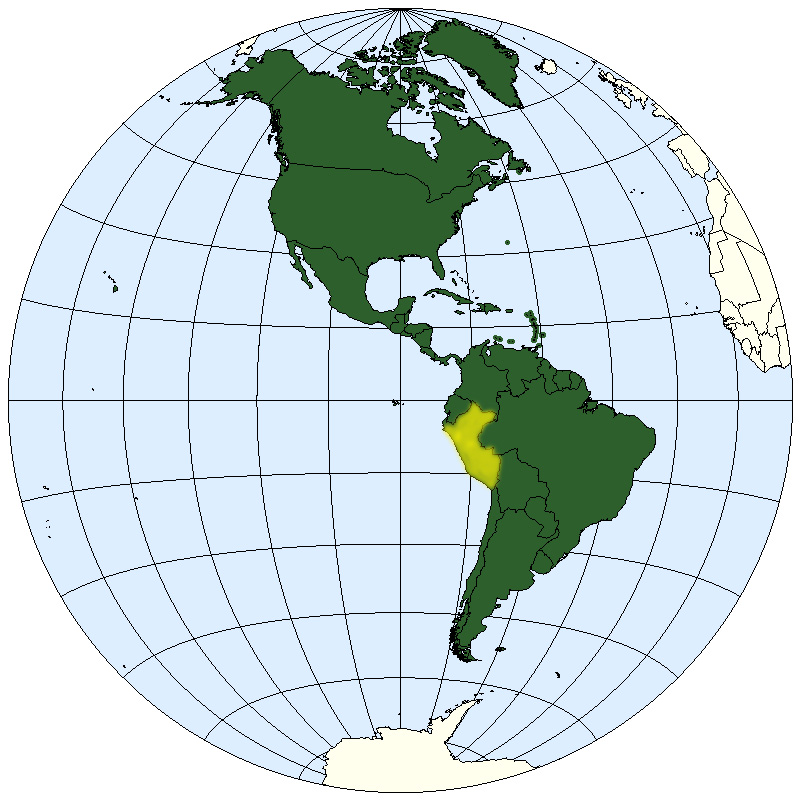
- habitat of the Phyllomedusa baltea

Conservation status
- Endangered (IUCN 3.1)

Scientific classification
- Kingdom: Animalia
- Phylum: Chordata
- Class: Amphibia
- Order: Anura
- Family: Phyllomedusidae
- Genus: Callimedusa
- Species: C. baltea

Binomial name
- Callimedusa baltea (Duellman and Toft, 1979)
- Callimedusa baltea is only known from the Serrania de Sira in east-central Peru

Synonyms
- Phyllomedusa baltea Duellman and Toft, 1979

= Callimedusa baltea =

Species of frog

Callimedusa baltea is a species of frog in the subfamily Phyllomedusinae. It is endemic to the western slope of the Serrania de Sira, Department of Huánuco, Peru. Common name purple-sided leaf frog has been proposed for it. The specific name baltea is Latin for "border" and refers to the salmon line that separates the dorsal and ventral colors of this frog.

== Description ==
The type series consists of three specimens: an adult female (the holotype), an adult male, and a juvenile. The adult specimens measure, respectively, 64 and 45 mm (2.5 and 1.8 in) in snout–vent length. The head is as wide as the body. The snout is truncate. The parotoid gland is rounded. The tympanum is partly covered by the diffuse supratympanic fold. The fingers bear large discs but no webbing is present. The toes bear somewhat smaller discs than the fingers and are similarly unwebbed. The dorsum is lime green while the ventrum is purple but has some white spots. The flanks are purple, with a continuous salmon-colored stripe separating the purple coloration from the dorsal green. The iris is greenish gray.

== Habitat and conservation ==
Callimedusa baltea inhabits low cloud forest at elevations of 1,280–1,500 m (4,200–4,920 ft) above sea level. Adult frogs have been found at night on vegetation by a pond. The tadpoles develop in temporary ponds. It is not a common species although it was recorded by surveys in both 2013 and 2014 at rate of about one individual per person hour. Outside the two sites where this species is known to occur, it is threatened by habitat loss. It is present in the El Sira Communal Reserve.

Scientists name logging, mining, coca farming, subsistence farming, and cattle farming as threats to this frog's habitat, possibly even within the El Sira Comunal Reserve. In other areas where the frog is known, the ground is too steep for logging or mining to be practical.
