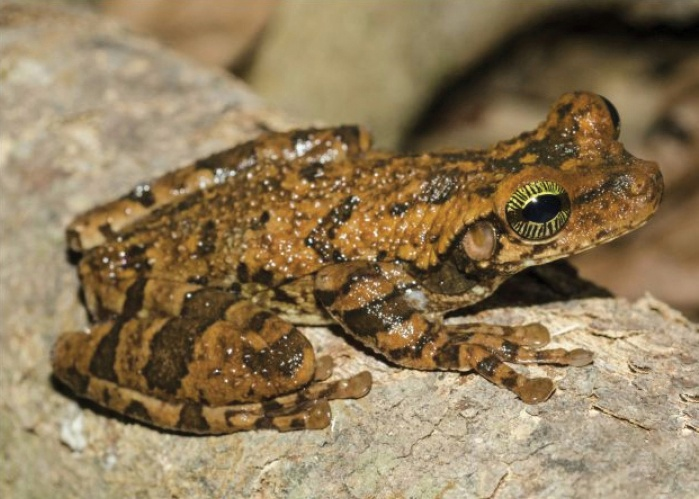

Conservation status
- Least Concern (IUCN 3.1)

Scientific classification
- Kingdom: Animalia
- Phylum: Chordata
- Class: Amphibia
- Order: Anura
- Family: Hylidae
- Genus: Osteocephalus
- Species: O. taurinus

Binomial name
- Osteocephalus taurinus Steindachner, 1862

Synonyms
- Hyla depressa Andersson, 1945 Hyla vilarsi Melin, 1941 Osteocephalus flavolineatus Steindachner, 1862

= Manaus slender-legged tree frog =

Species of amphibian

The Manaus slender-legged tree frog (Osteocephalus taurinus), also known as the giant broad-headed tree frog, is a species of frog in the family Hylidae found in Bolivia, Brazil, Colombia, Ecuador, French Guiana, Guyana, Peru, Suriname, and Venezuela. Its natural habitats are subtropical or tropical dry forest, subtropical or tropical moist lowland forest, moist savanna, rivers, intermittent freshwater marshes, and canals and ditches. It is threatened by habitat loss. It is also reported to produce bufotenin.

== Description ==
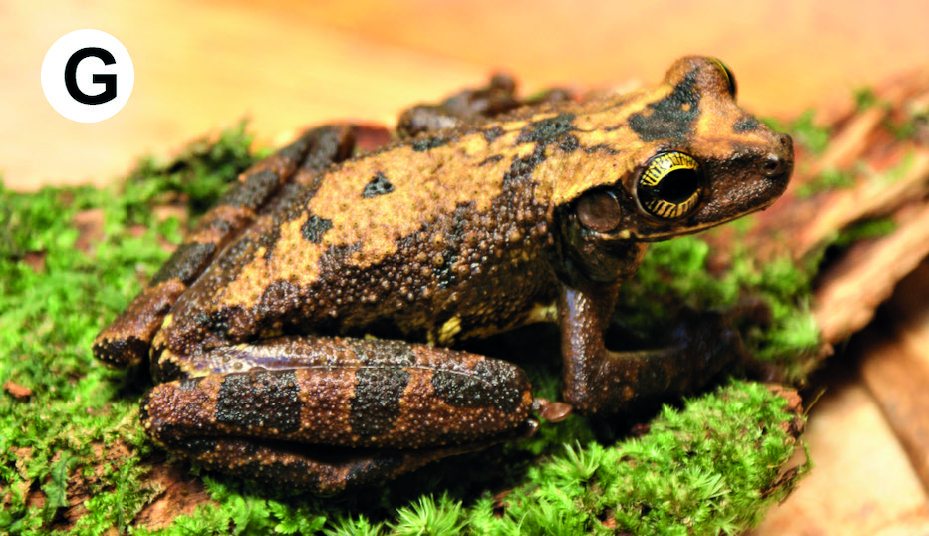
Amapá, Brazil

The adult male frog measures 71 to 92 mm long in snout-vent length and the adult female 90 to 101 mm.

The male frogs have warty skin and the female frogs have smooth skin. The skin of the frog's dorsum is light bronw to dark brown in color. Some frogs have a light brown line down the middle of the back. The back legs have dark brown transverse stripes. The iris of the eye is gold in color with black reticulation. The belly is cream to whitish in color.

== Biology ==
This frog is arboreal and nocturnal. When the male frogs sing for the female frogs, they sit on short plants or in the water. The female frog lays 2000 eggs per clutch, laid on the surface of the water. The eggs are black in color.

The tadpoles have a voracious appetite for frog eggs, both of their own and other species.
