= Osteocephalus castaneicola =

Conservation status
- Least Concern (IUCN 3.1)

Scientific classification
- Kingdom: Animalia
- Phylum: Chordata
- Class: Amphibia
- Order: Anura
- Family: Hylidae
- Genus: Osteocephalus
- Species: O. castaneicola

Binomial name
- Osteocephalus castaneicola Moravec, Aparicio, Guerrero-Reinhard, Calderón, Jungfer, and Gvoždík, 2009

Species of amphibian

Osteocephalus castaneicola is a species of frog in the family Hylidae. It is found in lowland Amazonia of northern Bolivia, adjacent southeastern Peru, and western Brazil (Acre, south-central Amazonas, and Rondônia). It breeds in water-filled fruit capsules of the Brazil nut, a characteristic also alluded to in its specific name castaneicola derived from the Latin castanea (horse chestnut, Aesculus), the root of the vernacular name castaña for the Brazil nut, together with the Latin colō meaning "to inhabit".

== Description ==
Adult males measure 48–51 mm (1.9–2.0 in) and adult females 48–63 mm (1.9–2.5 in) in snout–vent length. The snout is rounded in dorsal view and rounded, slightly inclined posteroventrally in lateral profile. The canthus rostralis is distinct. The tympanum is large, oval to round in shape. The supratympanic fold is conspicuous and covers the upper edge of the tympanum. The fingers have basal webbing whereas the toes are three quarters webbed. The dorsum is tan to pale brown to purple brown. and has some narrow irregular, dark brown markings. The upper lip has a narrow pale supralabial line that expands into a subocular spot. The flanks are uniformly pale. The throat and belly are creamy white. The thighs are ventrally fleshy pink. The iris is bicoloured: golden above, bronze below, and with a dark horizontal stripe and reticulate or radiating lines. Vocal sac in males is indistinct.

The largest tadpoles are 33–35 mm (1.3–1.4 in) in total length.

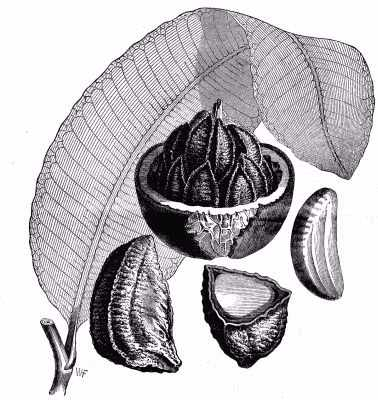
Tadpoles of Osteocephalus castaneicola develop in empty, water-filled Brazil nut capsules

== Reproduction ==
Reproduction takes place in water-filled Brazil nut fruit capsules, or seldom, in water-filled palm bracts lying on the forest floor. A single capsule can contain tens of tadpoles. These capsules are opened and left on the forest floor by agoutis or by local people. Osteocephalus castaneicola is the first hylid frog known to use this reproductive strategy, but similar behavior has been reported for two dendrobatids, Adelphobates castaneoticus and Adelphobates quinquevittatus, and for one bufonid, Rhinella castaneotica. The tadpoles are oophagous, i.e., they may consume conspecific eggs.

== Habitat and conservation ==
Osteocephalus castaneicola occurs in both terra firme (unflooded) and floodplain rainforests at elevations of 81–400 m (266–1,312 ft) above sea level. Individuals have typically been observed sitting on vegetation 0.5–2 m (2–7 ft) above the ground.

This species is locally threatened by habitat loss caused by agricultural activities (including habitat conversion for cattle ranching) and by illegal gold mining. It occurs in the Manu National Park and Los Amigos Conservation Concession in Peru, and in the Cuniã Ecological Station and Jamari National Forest in Brazil.
