= Osteocephalus cannatellai =

Scientific classification
- Kingdom: Animalia
- Phylum: Chordata
- Class: Amphibia
- Order: Anura
- Family: Hylidae
- Genus: Osteocephalus
- Species: O. cannatellai

Binomial name
- Osteocephalus cannatellai Ron, Venegas, Toral, Read, Ortiz, and Manzano, 2012

Species of frog

Osteocephalus cannatellai is a frog in the family Hylidae endemic to Ecuador and Colombia. Scientists have seen it between 200 and 1290 meters above sea level.

The adult male measures 38.5–57.2 mm in snout-vent length and the adult female 62.6–72.8 mm. The skin of the dorsum is dark green in color with light brown or dark brown marks. The ventrum is gray or cream in color with lighter spots. There is a light mark underneath each eye. The flanks are light green in color with darker marks. The bones are green in color. The iris of the eye is bronze in color with dark reticulations. Some frogs have bright blue pigmentation near the groin and on the legs.

This frog lives near streams with rocky bottoms. It has been observed to perch on leaves and branches 0.5 to 2.3 meters above the forest floor.

Scientists named this frog after David C. Cannatella, who studied the frogs of South America and taught many others.
