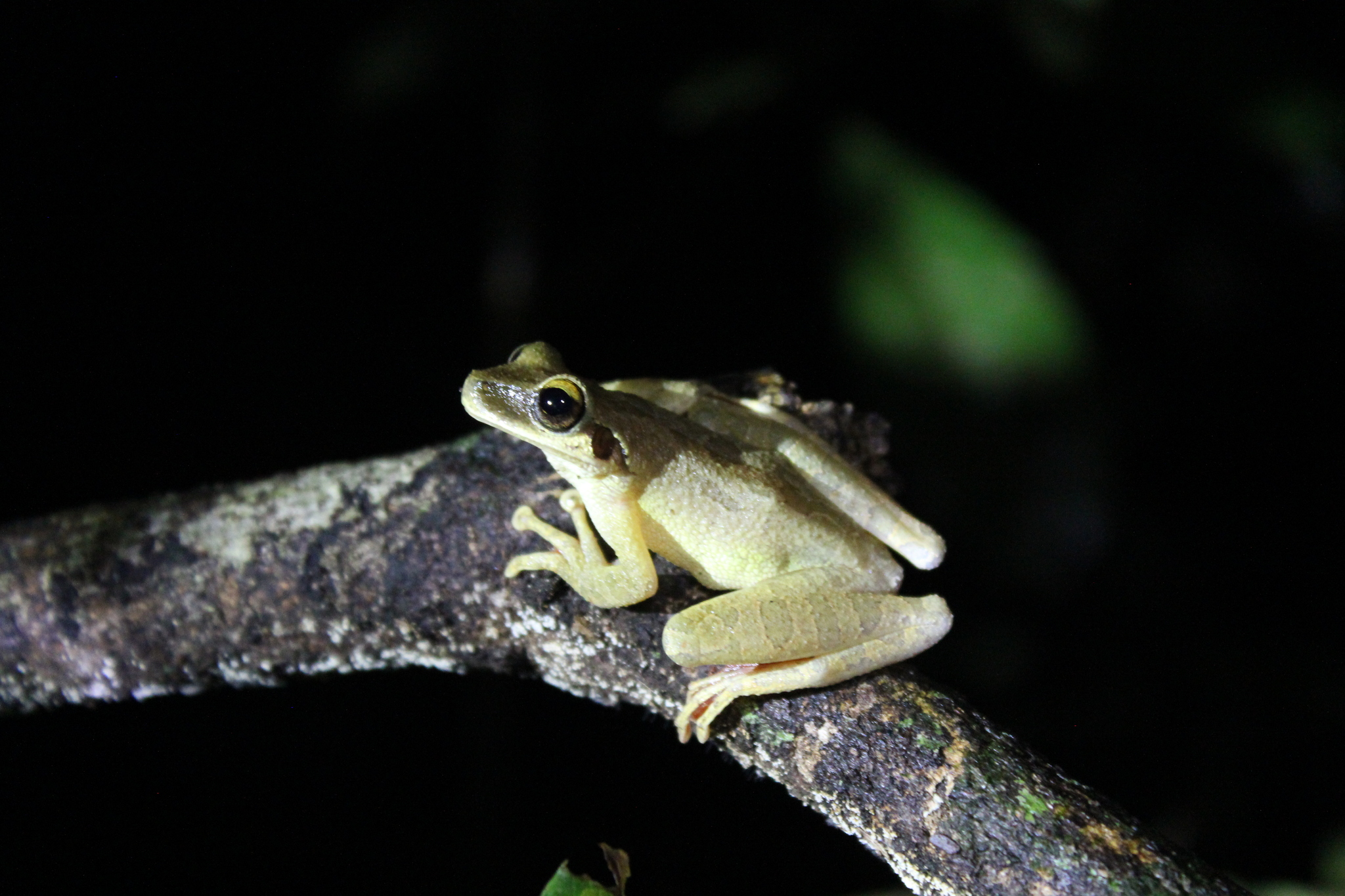
- In Manú Province, Peru

Conservation status
- Least Concern (IUCN 3.1)

Scientific classification
- Kingdom: Animalia
- Phylum: Chordata
- Class: Amphibia
- Order: Anura
- Family: Hylidae
- Genus: Osteocephalus
- Species: O. leprieurii

Binomial name
- Osteocephalus leprieurii (Duméril & Bibron, 1841)

Synonyms
- Osteocephalus ayarzaguenai Gorzula & Señaris, 1997 "1996"

= Cayenne slender-legged tree frog =

Species of amphibian

The Cayenne slender-legged tree frog (Osteocephalus leprieurii), also known as the Cayenne spiny-backed frog, is a species of frog in the family Hylidae found in northern South America.

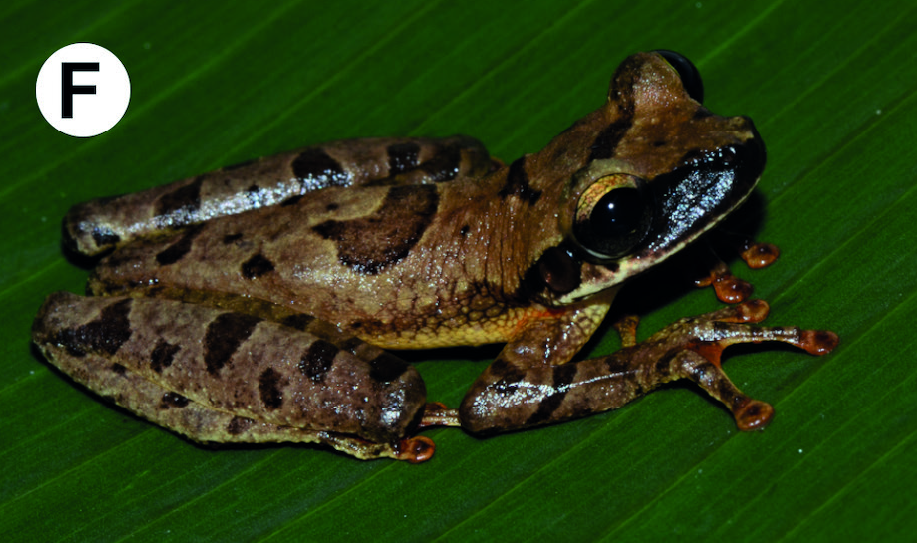
Amapá, Brazil
