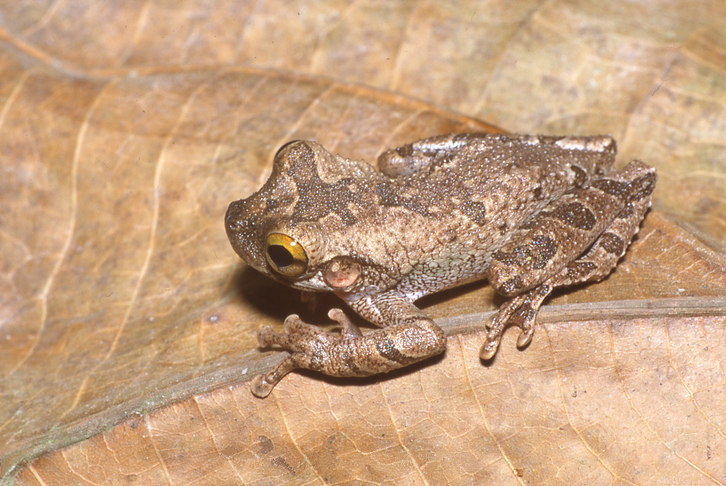

Conservation status
- Least Concern (IUCN 3.1)

Scientific classification
- Kingdom: Animalia
- Phylum: Chordata
- Class: Amphibia
- Order: Anura
- Family: Hylidae
- Genus: Osteocephalus
- Species: O. buckleyi

Binomial name
- Osteocephalus buckleyi (Boulenger, 1882)

Synonyms
- Hyla buckleyi Boulenger, 1882; Osteocephalus vilmae Ron, Venegas, Toral, Read, Ortiz, and Manzano, 2012

= Osteocephalus buckleyi =

Species of amphibian

Osteocephalus buckleyi, also known as Buckley's slender-legged treefrog, is a species of frog in the family Hylidae. It is found along the periphery of the Amazon Basin in Bolivia, Peru, Ecuador, Colombia, northeastern Brazil, Venezuela, Guyana, Suriname, and French Guiana, and also in the Orinoco Delta in Venezuela. It is probably a species complex. Some sources treat Osteocephalus vilmae from Ecuador and Peru as a valid species.

== Etymology ==
The specific name buckleyi honours Clarence Buckley, a collector active in Ecuador in 1880s and who collected the type series.

== Description ==
Males measure 38–45 mm (1.5–1.8 in) and females 40–51 mm (1.6–2.0 in) in snout–vent length. The dorsum is pale green with dark blotches. A yellow or coffee colored medial vertebral stripe might be present. The flanks vary from cream to light brown with darker spots that can approach black. In males, the dorsal skin has a mixture of small and large tubercles with keratinized points, whereas in adult females the dorsal tubercles are very dispersed. The head is almost as long as wide; the snout is truncated. The finger disks are expanded.

== Habitat and conservation ==
Natural habitats of Osteocephalus buckleyi are old and second growth rainforests and forest edges. It occurs at elevations below 700 m (2,300 ft) above sea level (below 1,660 m (5,450 ft) m in Colombia). Reproduction takes place in narrow permanent waterbodies (streams and igarapés). It can locally be threatened by habitat loss.
