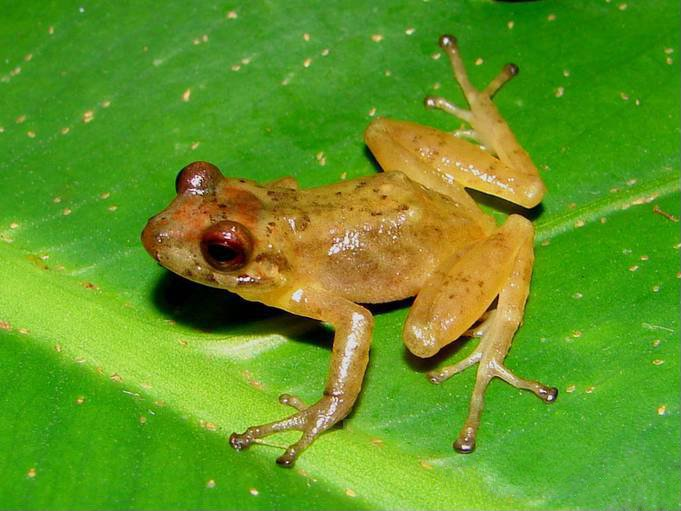
- Pristimantis prolixodiscus

Scientific classification
- Kingdom: Animalia
- Phylum: Chordata
- Class: Amphibia
- Order: Anura
- Clade: Brachycephaloidea
- Family: Craugastoridae
- Subfamily: Craugastorinae
- Genus: Tachiramantis; Heinicke, Barrio-Amorós, and Hedges, 2015

Species
- See text

= Tachiramantis =

Genus of frogs

Tachiramantis is a genus of bachyceploid frogs in family Craugastoridae. These frogs are endemic to Venezuela and Colombia.

== Species ==
The following species are recognised in the genus Tachiramantis:

- Tachiramantis cuentasi (Lynch, 2003)
- Tachiramantis douglasi (Lynch, 1996)
- Tachiramantis lassoalcalai (Barrio-Amorós, Rojas-Runjaic, and Barros, 2010)
- Tachiramantis lentiginosus (Rivero, 1984)
- Tachiramantis padrecarlosi (Mueses-Cisneros, 2006)
- Tachiramantis prolixodiscus (Lynch, 1978)
- Tachiramantis tayrona (Lynch and Ruiz-Carranza, 1985)
