= Tachiramantis douglasi =

Conservation status
- Vulnerable (IUCN 3.1)

Scientific classification
- Kingdom: Animalia
- Phylum: Chordata
- Class: Amphibia
- Order: Anura
- Clade: Brachycephaloidea
- Family: Craugastoridae
- Genus: Tachiramantis
- Species: T. douglasi

Binomial name
- Tachiramantis douglasi (Lynch, 1996)

Synonyms
- Eleutherodactylus douglasi Lynch, 1996; Pristimantis douglasi (Lynch, 1996)

Species of frog

Tachiramantis douglasi is a species of frog in the family Strabomantidae. It is found in Colombia and possibly Venezuela. Its natural habitat is tropical moist montane forests. It is threatened by habitat loss.
