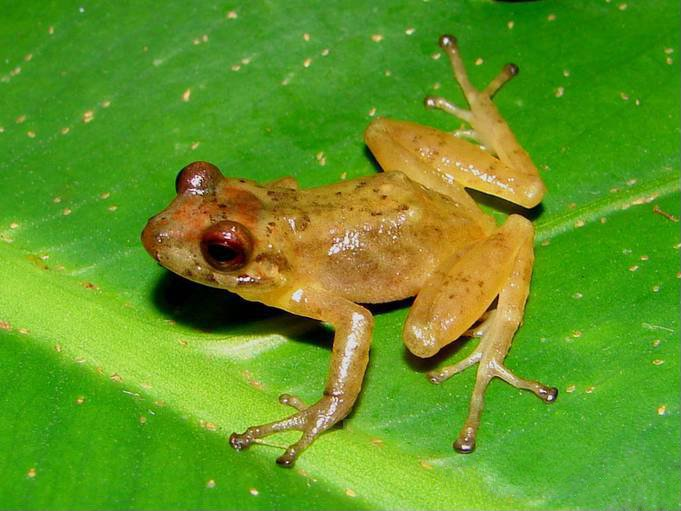

Conservation status
- Least Concern (IUCN 3.1)

Scientific classification
- Kingdom: Animalia
- Phylum: Chordata
- Class: Amphibia
- Order: Anura
- Clade: Brachycephaloidea
- Family: Craugastoridae
- Genus: Tachiramantis
- Species: T. prolixodiscus

Binomial name
- Tachiramantis prolixodiscus (Lynch, 1978)

Synonyms
- Pristimantis prolixodiscus (Lynch, 1978); Eleutherodactylus prolixodiscus Lynch, 1978; Eleutherodactylus chlorosoma Rivero, 1984 "1982"

= Tachiramantis prolixodiscus =

Species of frog

Tachiramantis prolixodiscus is a species of frog in the family Craugastoridae. It is found in the northern Cordillera Oriental in Colombia and adjacent Táchira, Barinas, and Mérida states of Venezuela. Its natural habitats are cloud forests (including secondary forest) and sub-páramo bush land where it occurs in terrestrial bromeliads. It is an abundant species, and although it is facing some threat from deforestation for agricultural development, illegal crops, logging, and human settlement, these are unlikely to be serious threats, especially in the higher parts of its altitudinal range (1,600–2,700 m (5,200–8,900 ft) asl).
