= Tachiramantis lentiginosus =

Conservation status
- Endangered (IUCN 3.1)

Scientific classification
- Kingdom: Animalia
- Phylum: Chordata
- Class: Amphibia
- Order: Anura
- Clade: Brachycephaloidea
- Family: Craugastoridae
- Genus: Tachiramantis
- Species: T. lentiginosus

Binomial name
- Tachiramantis lentiginosus (Rivero, 1984)

Synonyms
- Pristimantis lentiginosus (Rivero, 1984) Eleutherodactylus lentiginosus Rivero, 1984 "1982"

Species of frog

Tachiramantis lentiginosus is a species of frogs in the family Craugastoridae.

It is found in Colombia and Venezuela. Its natural habitats are tropical moist montane forests, rivers, and heavily degraded former forest. It is threatened by habitat loss.
