= Tachiramantis cuentasi =

Conservation status
- Endangered (IUCN 3.1)

Scientific classification
- Kingdom: Animalia
- Phylum: Chordata
- Class: Amphibia
- Order: Anura
- Clade: Brachycephaloidea
- Family: Craugastoridae
- Genus: Tachiramantis
- Species: T. cuentasi

Binomial name
- Tachiramantis cuentasi (Lynch, 2003)

Synonyms
- Eleutherodactylus cuentasi Lynch, 2003; Pristimantis cuentasi (Lynch, 2003)

Species of amphibian

Tachiramantis cuentasi is a species of frog in the family Strabomantidae.

It is found in Colombia and possibly Venezuela. It is threatened by habitat loss.
