= P. papillosus =

P. papillosus may refer to:

- Phyllolithodes papillosus, the flatspine triangle crab, a species of king crab
- Pseudophilautus papillosus, the papillated shrub frog, a species of frog in the family Rhacophoridae
