= Pseudophilautus popularis =

Conservation status
- Vulnerable (IUCN 3.1)

Scientific classification
- Kingdom: Animalia
- Phylum: Chordata
- Class: Amphibia
- Order: Anura
- Family: Rhacophoridae
- Genus: Pseudophilautus
- Species: P. popularis

Binomial name
- Pseudophilautus popularis (Manamendra-Arachchi & Pethiyagoda, 2004)

Synonyms
- Philautus popularis Manamendra-Arachchi & Pethiyagoda, 2004

Species of amphibian

Pseudophilautus popularis, the common shrub frog, is a species of frogs in the family Rhacophoridae.

It is endemic to Sri Lanka.

Its natural habitats are subtropical or tropical moist lowland forests, arable land, pastureland, rural gardens, and heavily degraded former forest. Scientists have seen it between 0 and 1067 meters above sea level.

The adult male frog measures about 17.7 – 21.3 mm in snout-vent length and the adult female frog about 23.0 – 25.6 mm when full of eggs. The top of the frog's head and the skin of the dorsum are brown in color. The flanks are dark brown or black in color with some white or light blue marks. The inguinal area is gray-brown in color. The area around the tympanum has blue dots. The legs are brown with darker brown bars. The ventrum is gray-brown in color. The bottoms of the hind legs are yellow in color. The webbed skin is yellow in color.

This frog is classified as vulnerable. Scientists attribute this to habitat loss from urbanization and to pollution, fertilizers, and pesticides. Scientists note that one of the places where the frog has been found, Bellanwila-Attidiya sanctuary, is a protected area.

== Original publication ==
- Manamendra-Arachchi K; Pethiyagoda R (2005). "The Sri Lankan shrub-frogs of the genus Philautus Gistel, 1848 (Ranidae:Rhacophorinae), with description of 27 new species". Raffles Bull Zool Suppl. 12: 163–303.
