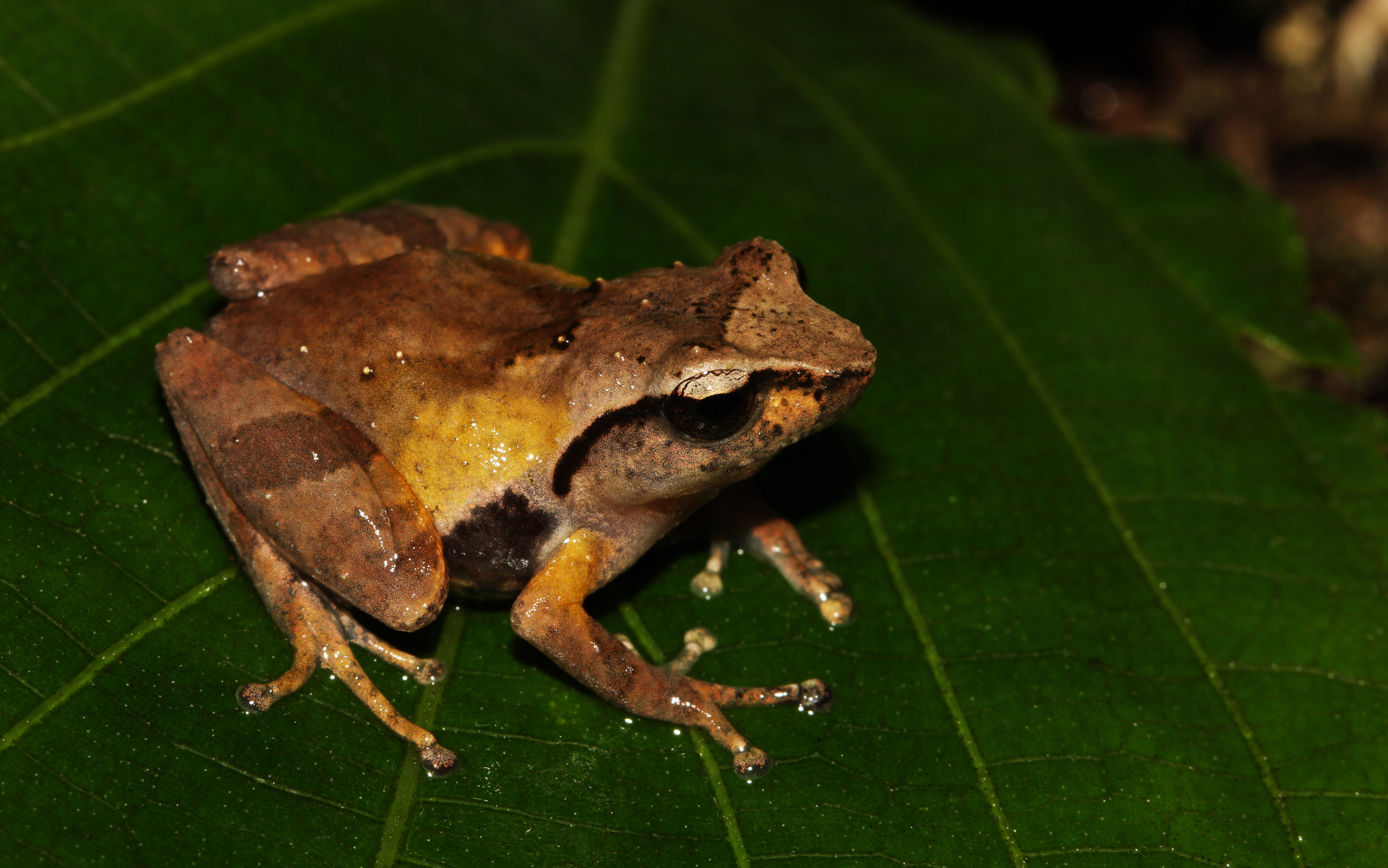

Conservation status
- Endangered (IUCN 3.1)

Scientific classification
- Kingdom: Animalia
- Phylum: Chordata
- Class: Amphibia
- Order: Anura
- Family: Rhacophoridae
- Genus: Pseudophilautus
- Species: P. caeruleus

Binomial name
- Pseudophilautus caeruleus (Manamendra-Arachchi & Pethiyagoda, 2004)

Synonyms
- Philautus caeruleus Manamendra-Arachchi & Pethiyagoda, 2004

= Pseudophilautus caeruleus =

Species of amphibian

Pseudophilautus caeruleus, commonly called blue thigh shrub frog, is a species of frogs in the family Rhacophoridae. It is endemic to Sri Lanka.

Its natural habitats are subtropical or tropical moist lowland forests and subtropical or tropical moist montane forests. It has been observed between 810 and 1370 meters above sea level. It was last known to be threatened by habitat loss in 2020.
