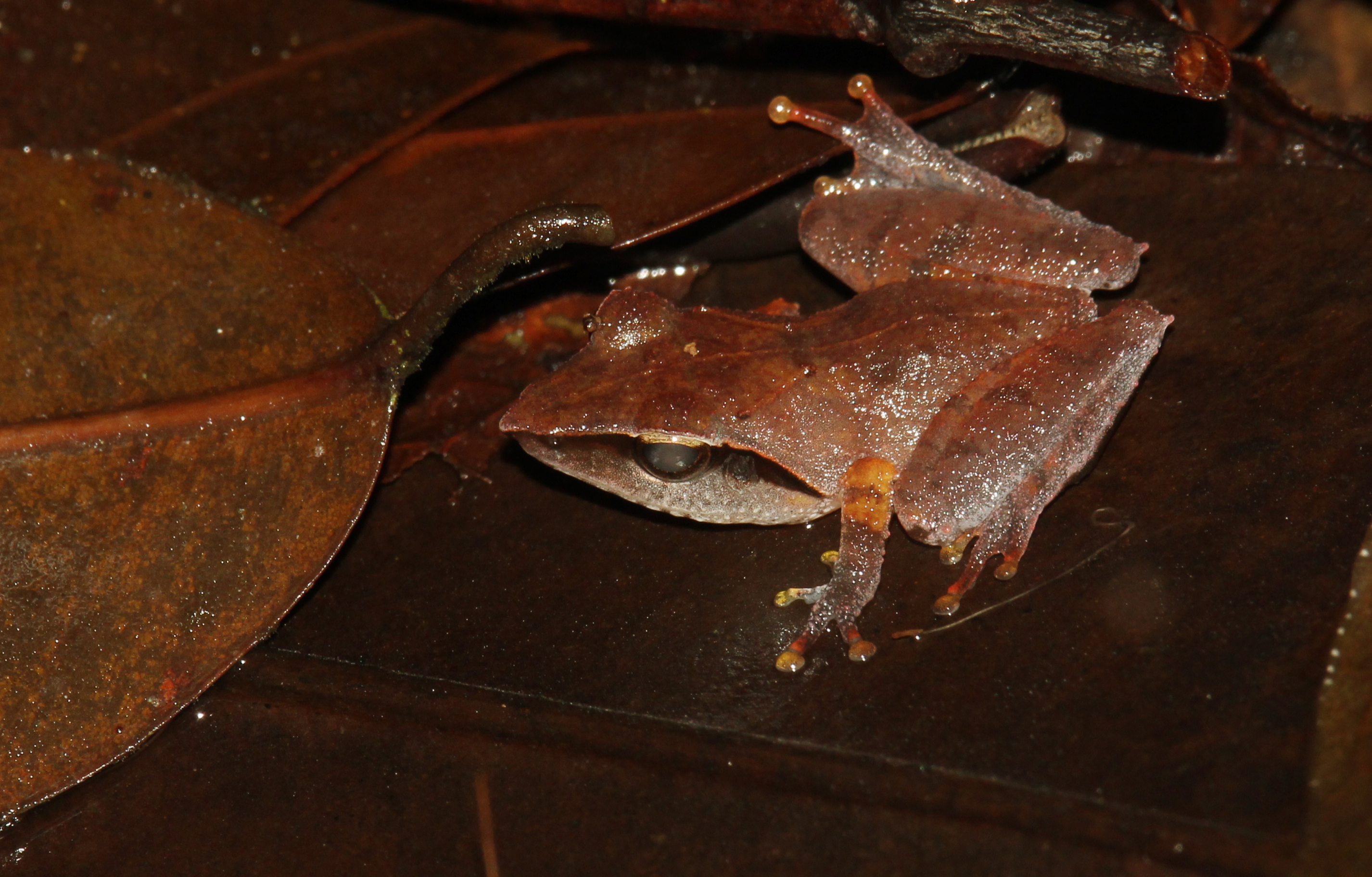

Conservation status
- Endangered (IUCN 3.1)

Scientific classification
- Kingdom: Animalia
- Phylum: Chordata
- Class: Amphibia
- Order: Anura
- Family: Rhacophoridae
- Genus: Pseudophilautus
- Species: P. cuspis

Binomial name
- Pseudophilautus cuspis (Manamendra-Arachchi & Pethiyagoda, 2004)

Synonyms
- Philautus cuspis Manamendra-Arachchi & Pethiyagoda, 2004

= Pseudophilautus cuspis =

Species of amphibian

Pseudophilautus cuspis, commonly known as sharp-snouted shrub frog, is a species of frogs in the family Rhacophoridae. It is endemic to Sri Lanka. It has been observed between 155 and 660 meters above sea level.

Its natural habitat is subtropical or tropical moist lowland forests. It is threatened by habitat loss.
