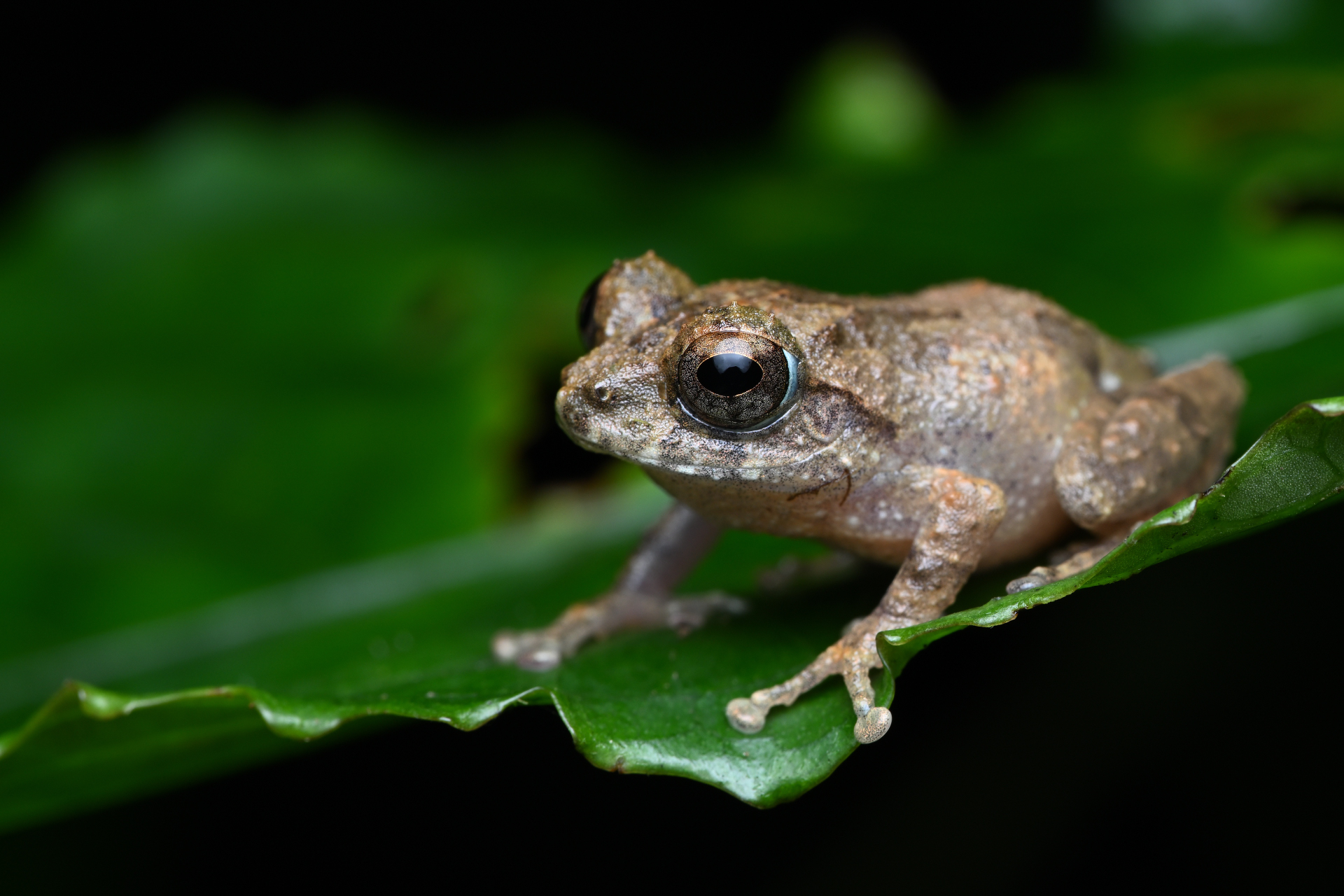

Conservation status
- Critically Endangered (IUCN 3.1)

Scientific classification
- Kingdom: Animalia
- Phylum: Chordata
- Class: Amphibia
- Order: Anura
- Family: Rhacophoridae
- Genus: Pseudophilautus
- Species: P. decoris

Binomial name
- Pseudophilautus decoris (Manamendra-Arachchi & Pethiyagoda, 2004)

Synonyms
- Philautus decoris Manamendra-Arachchi & Pethiyagoda, 2004

= Pseudophilautus decoris =

Species of amphibian

Pseudophilautus decoris, commonly known as the elegant shrub frog, is a species of frog in the family Rhacophoridae. It is endemic to Sri Lanka.

Its natural habitats are subtropical or tropical moist lowland forests, subtropical or tropical moist montane forests, plantations, and heavily degraded former forest. It has been observed in two places: one area 60m above sea level, and one area 1060 m above sea level.

The adult male frog measures up to 18.3–20.6 mm in snout-vent length, with females growing to 19.0–23.9 mm. The skin of the frog's back is gray-brown in color with dark brown bands and other marks. There is some yellow-green color on the shoulders and red-brown color in the middle, and the frog is marked with two black stripes. Parts of the back legs are light blue in color. The belly is yellow with small black spots. The bottoms of the feet are black with white marks.

The female frog lays 6–155 eggs per clutch. She mixes them into the dirt, which scientists believe breaks the clutch up into individual eggs, which may increase aeration. Inside the eggs, the growing frogs look like tadpoles, but they hatch as small frogs. The young frogs are the same colors as the adult frogs.

This frog is endangered. Possible causes include habitat loss from logging and pasturage, climate change and pollution in the form of fertilizers and pesticides. Natural and introduced predators also prey upon this frog. Scientists are not sure whether the fungal disease chytridiomycosis is present in Sri Lanka.

The scientific name decoris comes from a Greek word meaning "beautiful" or "elegant."

== First paper ==
- Manamendra-Arachchi K; Pethiyagoda R (2005). "The Sri Lankan shrub-frogs of the genus Philautus Gistel, 1848 (Ranidae:Rhacophorinae), with description of 27 new species". Raffles Bull Zool Suppl. 12: 163–303.
