= Pseudophilautus hoipolloi =

Conservation status
- Least Concern (IUCN 3.1)

Scientific classification
- Kingdom: Animalia
- Phylum: Chordata
- Class: Amphibia
- Order: Anura
- Family: Rhacophoridae
- Genus: Pseudophilautus
- Species: P. hoipolloi

Binomial name
- Pseudophilautus hoipolloi (Manamendra-Arachchi & Pethiyagoda, 2004)

Synonyms
- Philautus hoipolloi Manamendra-Arachchi & Pethiyagoda, 2004

Species of amphibian

Pseudophilautus hoipolloi, known as anthropogenic shrub frog, is a species of frogs in the family Rhacophoridae.

It is endemic to Sri Lanka. It has been observed between 15 and 684 meters above sea level.

Its natural habitats are subtropical or tropical moist lowland forests, arable land, plantations, rural gardens, and heavily degraded former forest.
