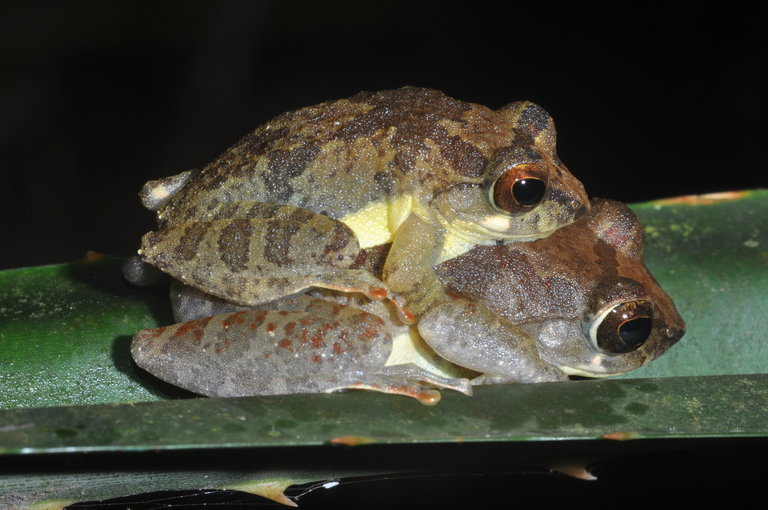

Conservation status
- Endangered (IUCN 3.1)

Scientific classification
- Kingdom: Animalia
- Phylum: Chordata
- Class: Amphibia
- Order: Anura
- Family: Rhacophoridae
- Genus: Pseudophilautus
- Species: P. abundus

Binomial name
- Pseudophilautus abundus (Manamendra-Arachchi & Pethiyagoda, 2004)

Synonyms
- Philautus abundus Manamendra-Arachchi & Pethiyagoda, 2004

= Pseudophilautus abundus =

Species of frog

Pseudophilautus abundus is a species of frog in the family Rhacophoridae. It is endemic to Sri Lanka.

Its natural habitats are subtropical or tropical moist lowland forests, subtropical or tropical moist shrubland, plantations, rural gardens, and heavily degraded former forest. It has been observed between 78 and 150 meters above sea level.

== Original description ==
- Manamendra-Arachchi K; Pethiyagoda R (2005). "The Sri Lankan shrub-frogs of the genus Philautus Gistel, 1848 (Ranidae:Rhacophorinae), with description of 27 new species". Raffles Bull Zool Suppl. 12: 163–303.
