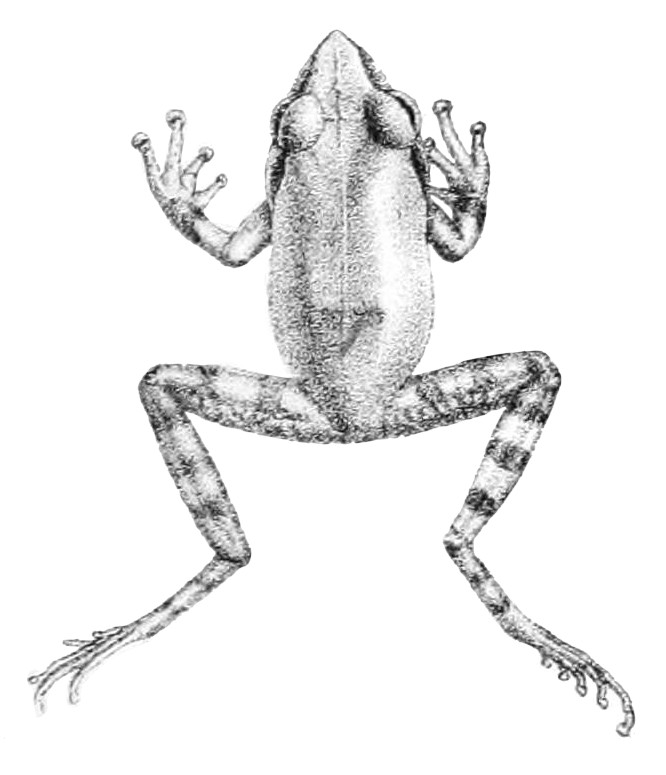

Conservation status
- Extinct (1869) (IUCN 3.1)

Scientific classification
- Kingdom: Animalia
- Phylum: Chordata
- Class: Amphibia
- Order: Anura
- Family: Rhacophoridae
- Genus: Pseudophilautus
- Species: †P. nasutus

Binomial name
- †Pseudophilautus nasutus (Günther, 1868)

Synonyms
- Ixalus nasutus Günther, 1869; Rhacophorus nasutus (Günther, 1869); Philautus nasutus (Günther, 1869)

= Pseudophilautus nasutus =

Extinct species of amphibian

Pseudophilautus nasutus (commonly known as the sharp-snout pygmy tree frog) is an extinct species of frog in the family Rhacophoridae. It was endemic to Sri Lanka, though it might occur or have occurred in India too.
