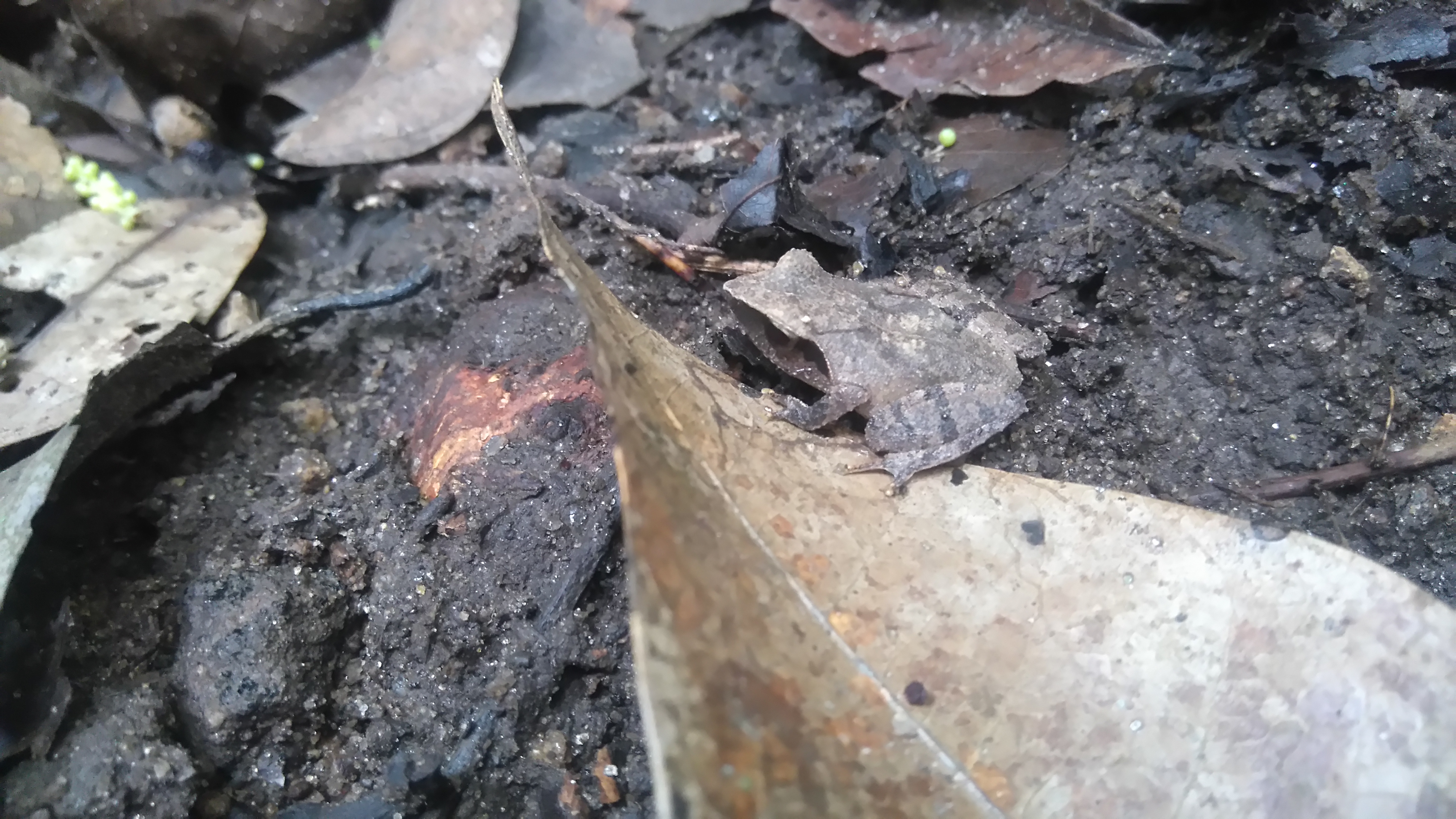

Conservation status
- Vulnerable (IUCN 3.1)

Scientific classification
- Kingdom: Animalia
- Phylum: Chordata
- Class: Amphibia
- Order: Anura
- Family: Rhacophoridae
- Genus: Pseudophilautus
- Species: P. zorro

Binomial name
- Pseudophilautus zorro (Manamendra-Arachchi and Pethiyagoda, 2005)

Synonyms
- Philautus zorro Manamendra-Arachchi and Pethiyagoda, 2005

= Pseudophilautus zorro =

Species of amphibian

Pseudophilautus zorro, the Gannoruwa shrub frog, is a species of frogs in the family Rhacophoridae. It is endemic to central Sri Lanka. People have seen it near Kandy and in the Knuckles Forest Reserve, 500–800 meters above sea level.

Its natural habitat is closed-canopy rainforest, but it can also occur in residential gardens with plenty of leaf-litter. It is threatened by habitat loss. Conde et al. have estimated that protecting the habitat of this species would cost of order US$200,000.

The adult male frog is 19–23 mm long from nose to rear end and the adult female frog is 22–30 mm. The skin of the frog's back is brown in color, and its belly has a dark brown color. The frogs in this species can look different from each other. They can be light brown, pale, green, or yellow. Scientists say this is to make the frog harder to see.

There are fewer of this frog than there were in the past. Scientists think this is because human beings build things in places where the frog lives and because of chemicals meant to kill pests and meant to make plants grow.
