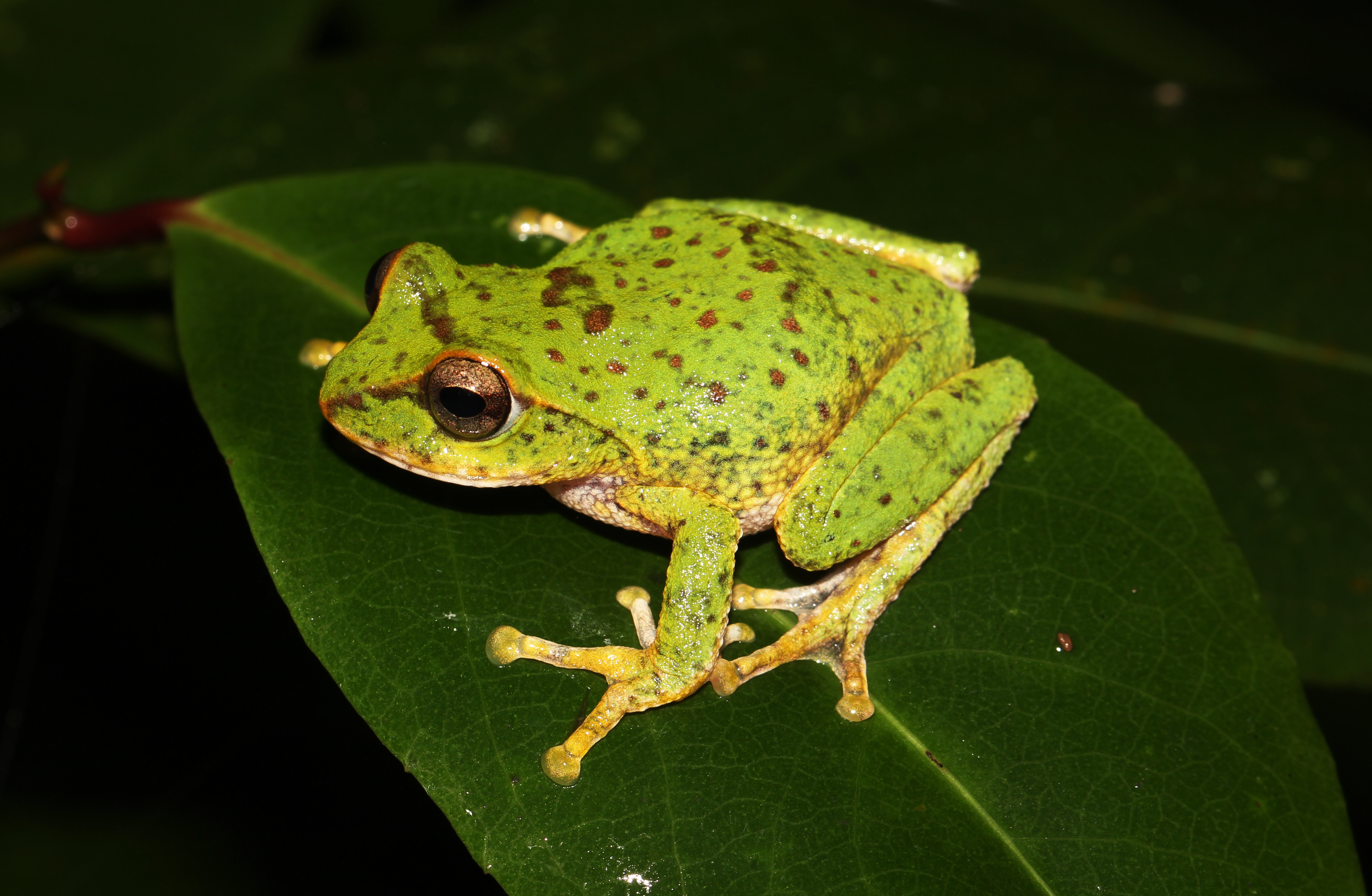

Conservation status
- Endangered (IUCN 3.1)

Scientific classification
- Kingdom: Animalia
- Phylum: Chordata
- Class: Amphibia
- Order: Anura
- Family: Rhacophoridae
- Genus: Pseudophilautus
- Species: P. frankenbergi

Binomial name
- Pseudophilautus frankenbergi (Meegaskumbura & Manamendra-Arachchi, 2005)

Synonyms
- Philautus frankenbergi Meegaskumbura & Manamendra-Arachchi, 2005

= Pseudophilautus frankenbergi =

Species of frog

Pseudophilautus frankenbergi, known as Frankenberg's shrub frog is a species of frog in the family Rhacophoridae. It is endemic to Sri Lanka.

Its natural habitat is subtropical or tropical moist montane forests. It is threatened by habitat loss.
