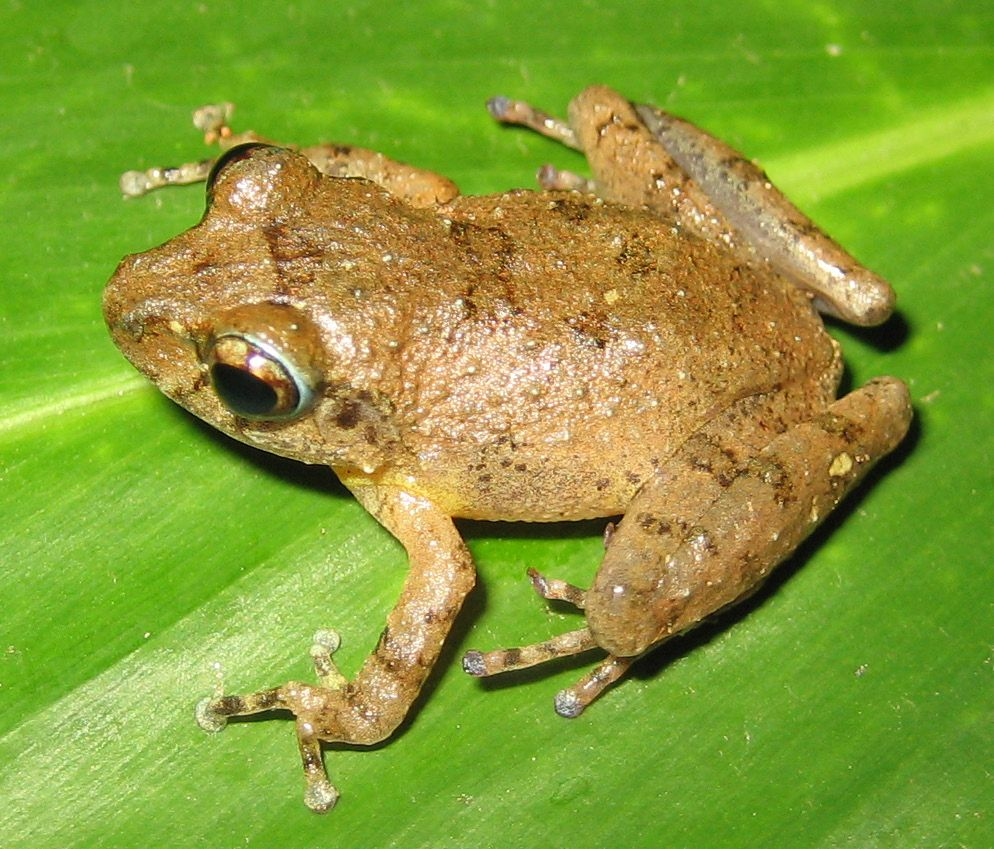
- Adult male Pseudophilautus rus from Hantane Range, Kandy

Scientific classification
- Domain: Eukaryota
- Kingdom: Animalia
- Phylum: Chordata
- Class: Amphibia
- Order: Anura
- Family: Rhacophoridae
- Subfamily: Rhacophorinae
- Genus: Pseudophilautus; Laurent, 1943

Species
- See text

= Pseudophilautus =

Genus of amphibians

Pseudophilautus is a genus of shrub frogs in the family Rhacophoridae endemic to the Western Ghats of southwestern India and to Sri Lanka where the majority of the species are found. Many of them are already extinct (marked with † in the species list). On the other, some species believed to be extinct have also been rediscovered.

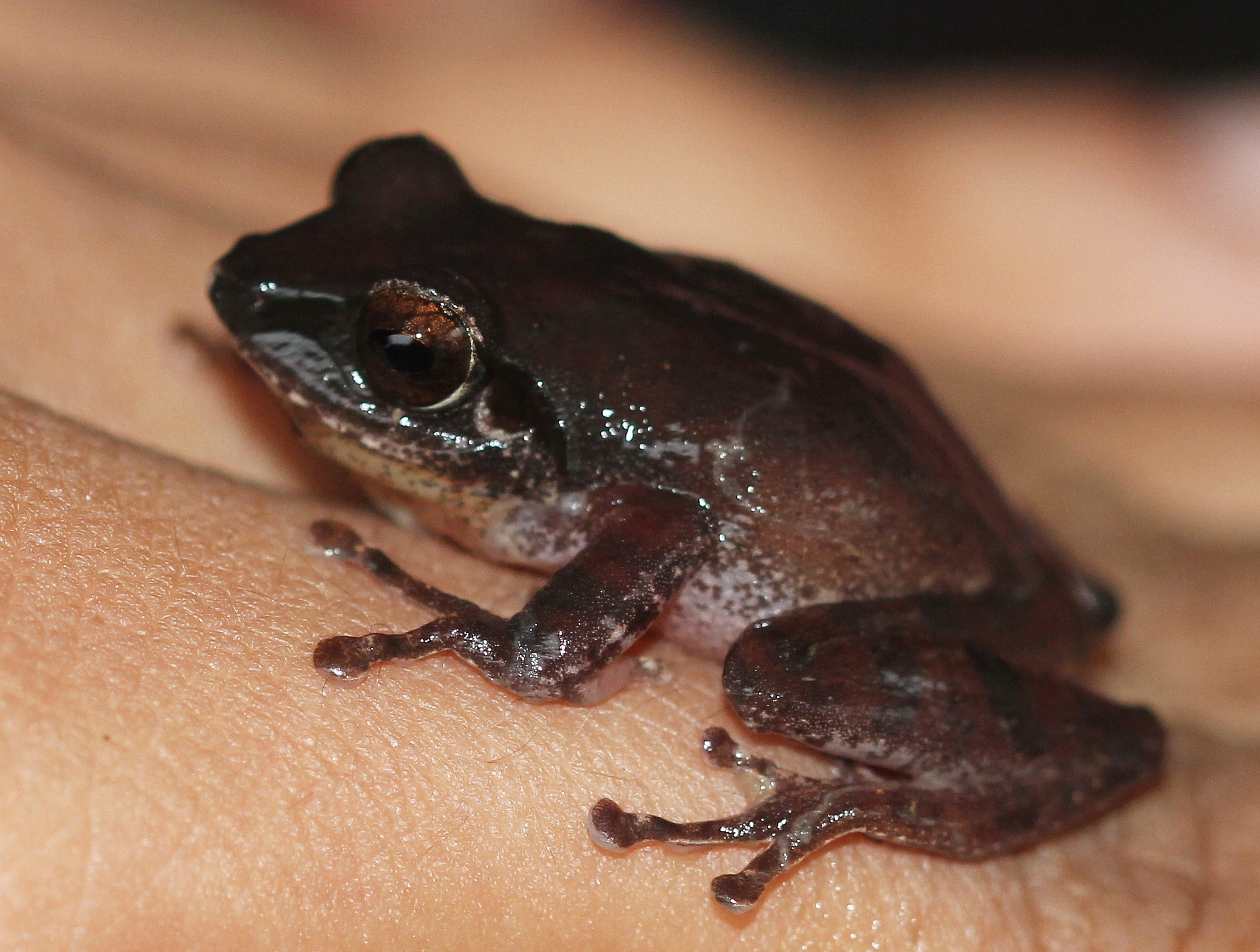
Pseudophilautus amboli, one of the Indian species

== Reproduction ==
Frogs in genus Pseudophilautus have direct development: eggs develop directly into froglets that resemble small adults. This strategy makes fully terrestrial reproduction possible. However, the eggs still require high humidity, and periods of dry weather may be detrimental.

The majority of species where reproductive behaviour is known deposit eggs in soil on the forest floor and only one (Pseudophilautus femoralis) on the leaves of understory shrubs. Males use advertisement calls to attract females, and tend to call more intensively during darkness and when humidity is high (e.g., during periods of rainfall). When a male has attracted a female to its vicinity, it approaches the female and enters the amplexus. In ground breeding species, the pair then ascends to the ground, changing colouration to match that of the leaf litter or soil, probably as camouflage. Female locates a suitable spot and excavates a cavity where the eggs are laid. After oviposition, the female mixes the eggs with soil and the male dismounts and returns to a perch. Female also leaves the site after covering the nest; there is no parental care. In leaf nesting species, the overall sequence is similar, but the pair does not change the colour. Eggs are adhesive and deposited to underside of a leaf. The female attends the eggs for few hours after oviposition, apparently to ensure that the eggs are properly attached.

Eggs are 3.7–5.7 mm (0.15–0.22 in) in diameter. Egg development takes 24–68 days. Pseudophilautus embryos lack external gills but they have a relatively large, vascularized tail. It is probable that embryos use their tail for respiration. Depending on the species, froglets hatch with or without the tail fully absorbed but with the yolk sac still visible.

== List of species ==
The following species are recognised in the genus Pseudophilautus, including eight species described in 2013 by Wickramasinghe and colleagues:

- Pseudophilautus abundus (Manamendra-Arachchi & Pethiyagoda, 2005)
- Pseudophilautus adspersus† (Günther, 1872)
- Pseudophilautus alto (Manamendra-Arachchi & Pethiyagoda, 2005)
- Pseudophilautus amboli (Biju and Bossuyt, 2009)
- Pseudophilautus asankai (Manamendra-Arachchi & Pethiyagoda, 2005)
- Pseudophilautus auratus (Manamendra-Arachchi & Pethiyagoda, 2005)
- Pseudophilautus bambaradeniyai Wickramasinghe et al., 2013
- Pseudophilautus caeruleus (Manamendra-Arachchi & Pethiyagoda, 2005)
- Pseudophilautus cavirostris (Günther, 1869)
- Pseudophilautus conniffae Batuwita, M. de Silva & Udugampala, 2019
- Pseudophilautus cuspis (Manamendra-Arachchi & Pethiyagoda, 2005)
- Pseudophilautus dayawansai Wickramasinghe et al., 2013
- Pseudophilautus decoris (Manamendra-Arachchi & Pethiyagoda, 2005)
- Pseudophilautus dilmah (Wickramasinghe, Bandara, Vidanapathirana, Tennakoon, Samarakoon & Wickramasinghe, 2015)
- Pseudophilautus dimbullae† (Shreve, 1940)
- Pseudophilautus eximius† (Shreve, 1940)
- Pseudophilautus extirpo† (Manamendra-Arachchi & Pethiyagoda, 2005)
- Pseudophilautus femoralis (Günther, 1864)
- Pseudophilautus fergusonianus (Ahl, 1927)
- Pseudophilautus folicola (Manamendra-Arachchi & Pethiyagoda, 2005)
- Pseudophilautus frankenbergi (Meegaskumbura & Manamendra-Arachchi, 2005)
- Pseudophilautus fulvus (Manamendra-Arachchi & Pethiyagoda, 2005)
- Pseudophilautus hallidayi (Meegaskumbura & Manamendra-Arachchi, 2005)
- Pseudophilautus halyi† (Boulenger, 1904)
- Pseudophilautus hankeni Meegaskumbura & Manamendra-Archchi, 2011
- Pseudophilautus hoipolloi (Manamendra-Arachchi & Pethiyagoda, 2005)
- Pseudophilautus hypomelas (Günther, 1876)
- Pseudophilautus jagathgunawardanai Wickramasinghe et al., 2013
- Pseudophilautus kani (Biju and Bossuyt, 2009)
- Pseudophilautus karunarathnai Wickramasinghe et al., 2013
- Pseudophilautus leucorhinus† (Lichtenstein and Martens, 1856)
- Pseudophilautus limbus (Manamendra-Arachchi & Pethiyagoda, 2005)
- Pseudophilautus lunatus (Manamendra-Arachchi & Pethiyagoda, 2005)
- Pseudophilautus macropus (Günther, 1869)
- Pseudophilautus maia (Meegaskumbura et al., 2007)
- Pseudophilautus malcolmsmithi (Ahl, 1927)
- Pseudophilautus microtympanum (Günther, 1858)
- Pseudophilautus mittermeieri (Meegaskumbura & Manamendra-Arachchi, 2005)
- Pseudophilautus mooreorum (Meegaskumbura & Manamendra-Arachchi, 2005)
- Pseudophilautus nanus† (Günther, 1869)
- Pseudophilautus nasutus† (Günther, 1869)
- Pseudophilautus nemus (Manamendra-Arachchi & Pethiyagoda, 2005)
- Pseudophilautus newtonjayawardanei Wickramasinghe et al., 2013
- Pseudophilautus ocularis (Manamendra-Arachchi & Pethiyagoda, 2005)
- Pseudophilautus oxyrhynchus (Günther, 1872)
- Pseudophilautus papillosus (Manamendra-Arachchi & Pethiyagoda, 2005)
- Pseudophilautus pardus (Meegaskumbura et al., 2007)
- Pseudophilautus pleurotaenia (Boulenger, 1904)
- Pseudophilautus poppiae (Meegaskumbura & Manamendra-Arachchi, 2005)
- Pseudophilautus popularis (Manamendra-Arachchi & Pethiyagoda, 2005)
- Pseudophilautus procax (Manamendra-Arachchi & Pethiyagoda, 2005)
- Pseudophilautus puranappu Wickramasinghe et al., 2013
- Pseudophilautus regius (Manamendra-Arachchi & Pethiyagoda, 2005)
- Pseudophilautus reticulatus (Günther, 1864)
- Pseudophilautus rugatus† (Ahl, 1927)
- Pseudophilautus rus (Manamendra-Arachchi & Pethiyagoda, 2005)
- Pseudophilautus samarakoon Wickramasinghe et al., 2013
- Pseudophilautus sarasinorum (Müller, 1887)
- Pseudophilautus schmarda (Kelaart, 1854)
- Pseudophilautus schneideri Meegaskumbura & Manamendra-Archchi, 2011
- Pseudophilautus semiruber (Annandale, 1913)
- Pseudophilautus silus (Manamendra-Arachchi & Pethiyagoda, 2005)
- Pseudophilautus silvaticus (Manamendra-Arachchi & Pethiyagoda, 2005)
- Pseudophilautus simba (Manamendra-Arachchi & Pethiyagoda, 2005)
- Pseudophilautus singu (Meegaskumbura, Manamendra-Arachchi, and Pethiyagoda, 2009)
- Pseudophilautus sirilwijesundarai (Wickramasinghe et al., 2013)
- Pseudophilautus sordidus (Manamendra-Arachchi & Pethiyagoda, 2005)
- Pseudophilautus steineri (Meegaskumbura & Manamendra-Arachchi, 2005)
- Pseudophilautus stellatus (Kelaart, 1853)
- Pseudophilautus stictomerus (Günther, 1876)
- Pseudophilautus stuarti Wickramasinghe et al., 2013
- Pseudophilautus tanu (Meegaskumbura, Manamendra-Arachchi, and Pethiyagoda, 2009)
- Pseudophilautus temporalis† (Günther, 1864)
- Pseudophilautus variabilis† (Günther, 1858)
- Pseudophilautus viridis (Manamendra-Arachchi & Pethiyagoda, 2005)
- Pseudophilautus wynaadensis (Jerdon, 1854)
- Pseudophilautus zal† (Manamendra-Arachchi & Pethiyagoda, 2005)
- Pseudophilautus zimmeri† (Ahl, 1927)
- Pseudophilautus zorro (Manamendra-Arachchi & Pethiyagoda, 2005)
