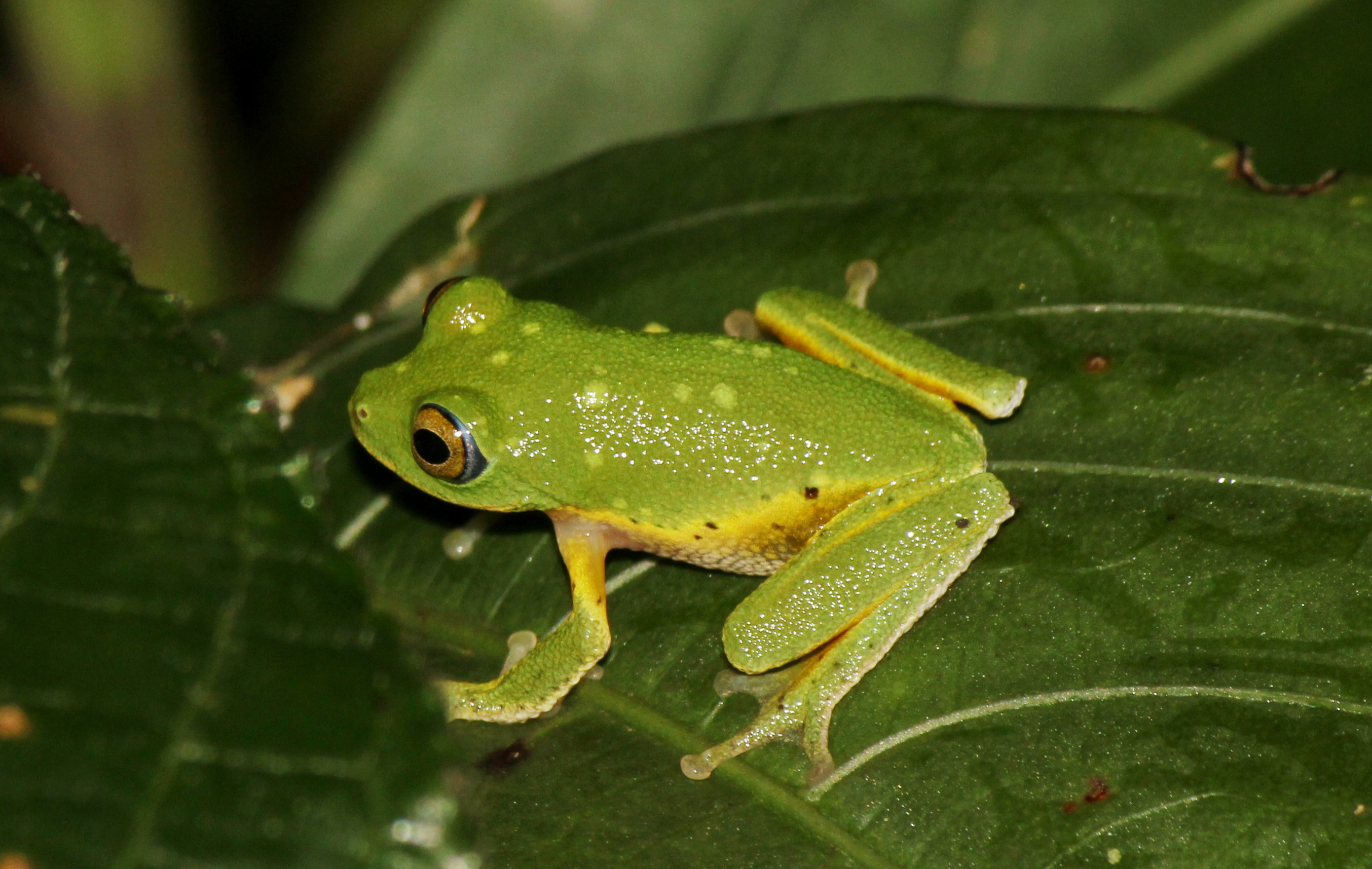

Conservation status
- Endangered (IUCN 3.1)

Scientific classification
- Kingdom: Animalia
- Phylum: Chordata
- Class: Amphibia
- Order: Anura
- Family: Rhacophoridae
- Genus: Pseudophilautus
- Species: P. femoralis

Binomial name
- Pseudophilautus femoralis (Günther, 1864)

Synonyms
- Philautus femoralis (Günther, 1864); Ixalus fergasonii Günther, 1876; Ixalus pulchellus Günther, 1872

= Pseudophilautus femoralis =

Species of amphibian

Pseudophilautus femoralis, commonly known as the round-snout pygmy frog, is a species of frog in the family Rhacophoridae. It is endemic to Sri Lanka.

Its natural habitat is subtropical or tropical moist montane forests. It is threatened by habitat loss.
