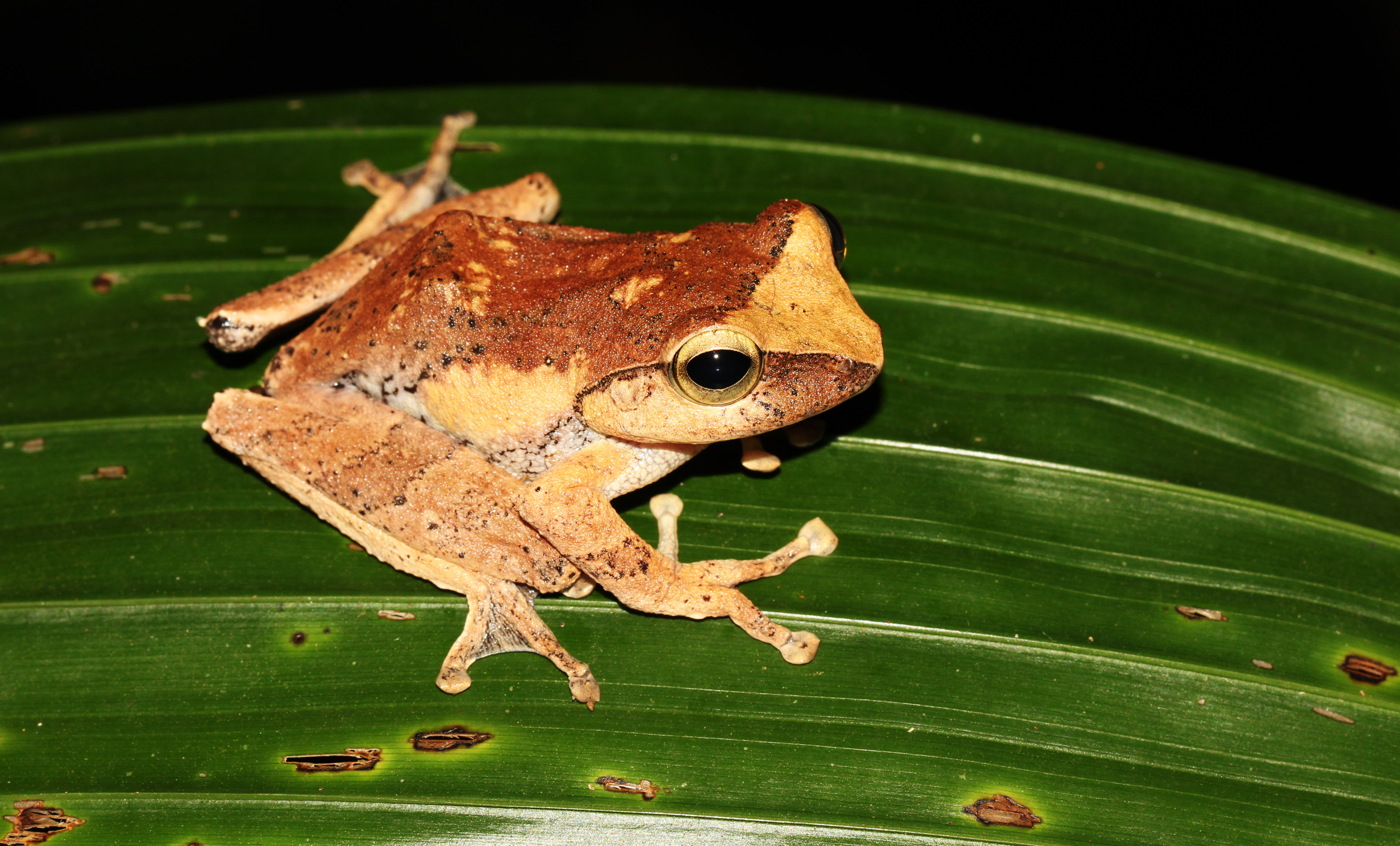

Conservation status
- Vulnerable (IUCN 3.1)

Scientific classification
- Kingdom: Animalia
- Phylum: Chordata
- Class: Amphibia
- Order: Anura
- Family: Rhacophoridae
- Genus: Pseudophilautus
- Species: P. reticulatus

Binomial name
- Pseudophilautus reticulatus (Günther, 1869)

Synonyms
- Philautus reticulatus (Günther, 1864)

= Pseudophilautus reticulatus =

Species of frog

Pseudophilautus reticulatus, known as reticulated-thigh shrub frog, is a species of frog in the family Rhacophoridae. It is endemic to Sri Lanka.

Its natural habitat is subtropical or tropical moist lowland forests. It is threatened by habitat loss.
