= Pseudophilautus procax =

Conservation status
- Critically Endangered (IUCN 3.1)

Scientific classification
- Kingdom: Animalia
- Phylum: Chordata
- Class: Amphibia
- Order: Anura
- Family: Rhacophoridae
- Genus: Pseudophilautus
- Species: P. procax

Binomial name
- Pseudophilautus procax (Manamendra-Arachchi & Pethiyagoda, 2004)

Synonyms
- Philautus procax Manamendra-Arachchi & Pethiyagoda, 2004

Species of amphibian

Pseudophilautus procax, known as cheeky shrub frog is a species of frogs in the family Rhacophoridae.

It is endemic to Sri Lanka. It has been observed in the Rakwana Hills, about 1060 meters above sea level.

Its natural habitats are subtropical or tropical moist lowland forests and subtropical or tropical moist montane forests. It is threatened by habitat loss.
