= Pseudophilautus dayawansai =

Dayawansa's shrub frog

Conservation status
- Critically Endangered (IUCN 3.1)

Scientific classification
- Kingdom: Animalia
- Phylum: Chordata
- Class: Amphibia
- Order: Anura
- Family: Rhacophoridae
- Genus: Pseudophilautus
- Species: P. dayawansai

Binomial name
- Pseudophilautus dayawansai Wickramasinghe et al, 2013

Species of amphibian

Pseudophilautus dayawansai (Dayawansa's shrub frog) is a species of frog in the family Rhacophoridae, endemic to Sri Lanka.

Its natural habitats are wet lowland forests of Sri Lanka. It is threatened by habitat loss. People have observed it perched in shrubs as high as 2 meters above the ground. It is one of the 8 species of rhacophorids that was discovered from Adam's Peak recently. Scientists know it exclusively from the type locality: Sripada Peak in the Peak Wilderness, 1679 meters above sea level.

== Etymology ==
The frog was named after Dr. Nihal Dayawansa, a senior lecturer in zoology in University of Colombo.

== Description ==
The adult male frog measures 24.5 – 26.2 mm in snout-vent length and the adult female frog about 30.1 mm long. This species can be easily identified by yellow patches on eyes, snout, and sides of the body. There are black rings on forehead and dorsum is brownish in color. There is also a light brown mark on the back in the shape of a triangle. The skin of the dorsum is brown in color with darker brown marks. The legs are dark brown with some maroon color.

==Life cycle==Like other frogs in Pseudophilautus, they undergo direct development, hatching from eggs as froglets with no free-swimming tadpole stage.
