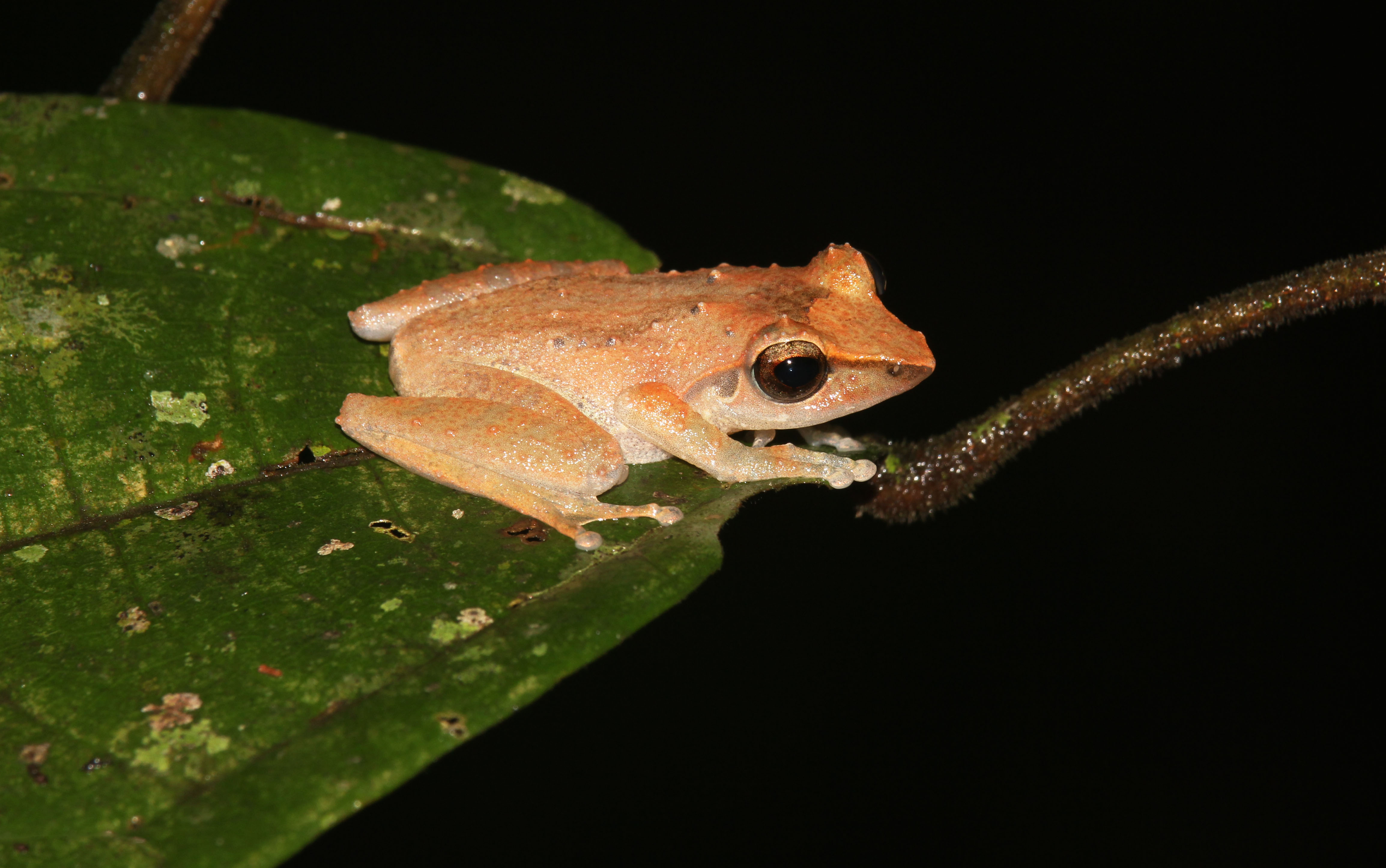

Conservation status
- Vulnerable (IUCN 3.1)

Scientific classification
- Kingdom: Animalia
- Phylum: Chordata
- Class: Amphibia
- Order: Anura
- Family: Rhacophoridae
- Genus: Pseudophilautus
- Species: P. folicola

Binomial name
- Pseudophilautus folicola (Manamendra-Arachchi & Pethiyagoda, 2004)

Synonyms
- Philautus folicola Manamendra-Arachchi & Pethiyagoda, 2004

= Pseudophilautus folicola =

Species of amphibian

Pseudophilautus folicola, known as leaf-dwelling shrub frog, is a species of frogs in the family Rhacophoridae.

It is endemic to Sri Lanka.

Its natural habitats are subtropical or tropical moist lowland forests and heavily degraded former forest. It is threatened by habitat loss.
