= Pseudophilautus malcolmsmithi =

Conservation status
- Extinct (IUCN 3.1)

Scientific classification
- Kingdom: Animalia
- Phylum: Chordata
- Class: Amphibia
- Order: Anura
- Family: Rhacophoridae
- Genus: Pseudophilautus
- Species: †P. malcolmsmithi

Binomial name
- †Pseudophilautus malcolmsmithi (Ahl, 1927)

Synonyms
- Rhacophorus malcolmsmithi Ahl, 1927; Philautus malcolmsmithi (Ahl, 1927)

Extinct species of amphibian

Pseudophilautus malcolmsmithi was a species of frog in the family Rhacophoridae. It was endemic to Sri Lanka and only known to science from the holotype.
