= Pseudophilautus newtonjayawardanei =

Newton Jayawardanei's Shrub Frog

Conservation status
- Data Deficient (IUCN 3.1)

Scientific classification
- Kingdom: Animalia
- Phylum: Chordata
- Class: Amphibia
- Order: Anura
- Family: Rhacophoridae
- Genus: Pseudophilautus
- Species: P. newtonjayawardanei

Binomial name
- Pseudophilautus newtonjayawardanei Wickramasinghe et al, 2013

Species of amphibian

Pseudophilautus newtonjayawardanei (Newton Jayawardanei's shrub frog) is a species of frogs in the family Rhacophoridae, endemic to Sri Lanka.

== Habitat and threats ==
Its natural habitats are wet lowland forests of Sri Lanka where the trees form a closed canopy. It is one of the 8 species of rhacophorids that were discovered from Adam's Peak in 2013. It has been observed between 1800 and 2000 m above sea level. In those areas, people have seen it sitting on leaves 8 m above the ground.

It is threatened by habitat loss, which scientists attribute to increased urbanization, agriculture, grazing, and logging.

== Etymology ==
The frog was named after Dr. Newton Jayawardane, a surgeon and a wildlife conservationist.

== Appearance ==
The adult female frog measures 38.4 mm in snout-vent length. The skin of the dorsum is bronze in color. There is a white stripe in the middle of the back. There are dark brown stripes sideways from the eyes to the groin. There are small bronze marks on the snout and face. The flanks are lighter in color green, brown, and white spots. There are brown marks on the legs. The ends of the toes are almost white in color. The webbed skin is also off-white. This frog has a dark brown cross band between eyes.

== Original description ==
- Wickramasinghe LJM; Vidanapathirana DR; Rajeev MDG; Ariyarathne SC; Chanaka AWA; Priyantha LLD; Bandara IN; Wickramasinghe N. (2013). "Eight new species of Pseudophilautus (Amphibia: Anura: Rhacophoridae) from Sripada World Heritage Site (Peak Wilderness), a local amphibian hotspot in Sri Lanka". J Threatened Taxa (Abstract). 5 (4): 3789–3920. doi:10.11609/jott.864.3789-3920 (inactive 12 July 2025).
