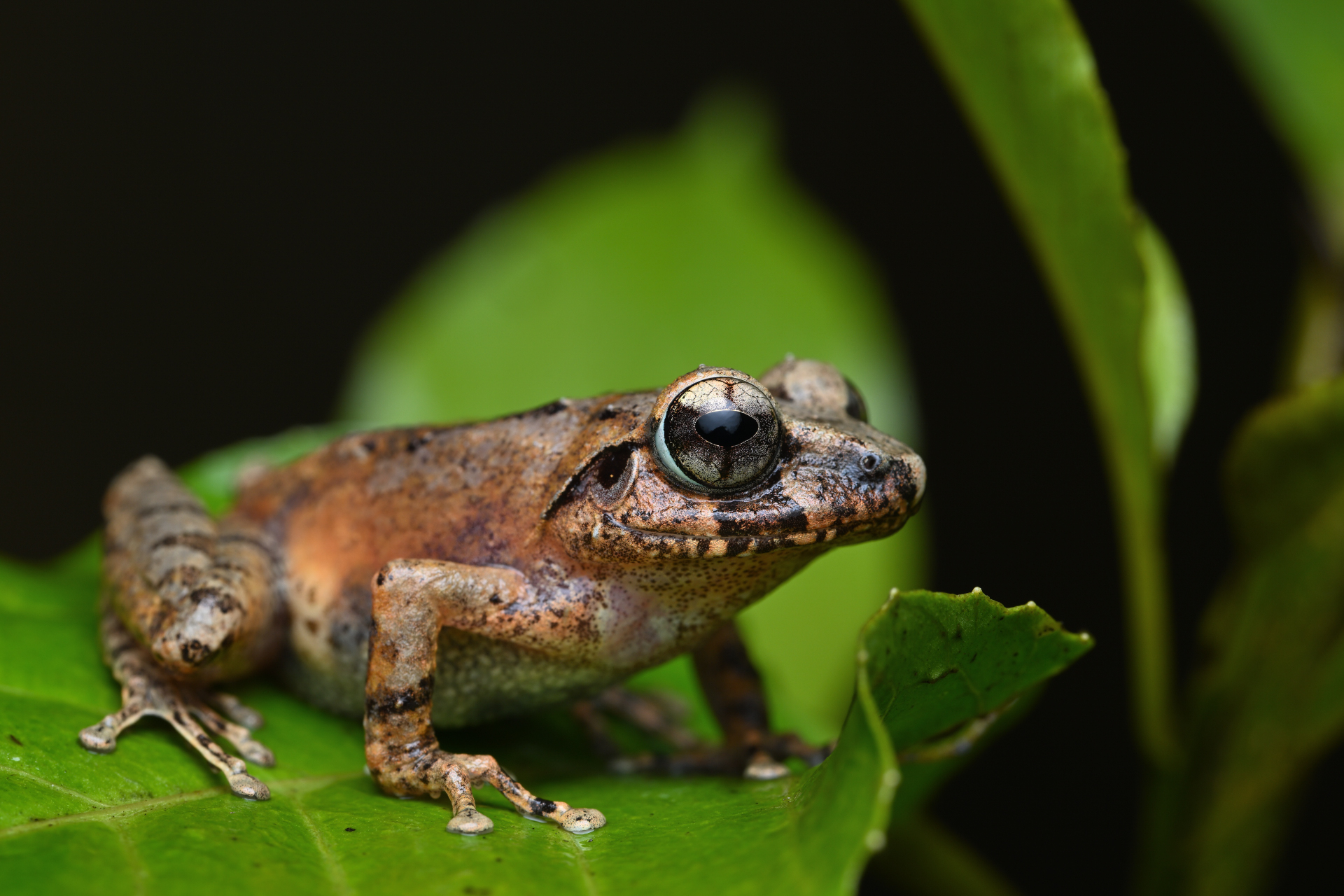

Conservation status
- Critically Endangered (IUCN 3.1)

Scientific classification
- Kingdom: Animalia
- Phylum: Chordata
- Class: Amphibia
- Order: Anura
- Family: Rhacophoridae
- Genus: Pseudophilautus
- Species: P. lunatus

Binomial name
- Pseudophilautus lunatus (Manamendra-Arachchi & Pethiyagoda, 2004)

Synonyms
- Philautus lunatus Manamendra-Arachchi & Pethiyagoda, 2004

= Pseudophilautus lunatus =

Species of amphibian

Pseudophilautus lunatus, commonly known as Handapan Ella shrub frog, is a species of frogs in the family Rhacophoridae.

It is endemic to Sri Lanka. Its natural habitats are subtropical or tropical moist montane forests and heavily degraded former forest. It is threatened by habitat loss. Scientists know it exclusively from the type locality: Handapan Ell Plains, in the eastern part of the Sinharaja World Heritage Site, 1270 meters above sea level.

One adult female frog was found to be 40.9 m long in snout-vent length. This frog has black spots near the eyes and white color on the chin. The skin of the dorsum is red-brown in the middle of the back and gray-brown with black marks on the sides of the back. The ventrum is gray-white in color. The toes are dark gray in color, and the tops of the toes have some yellow color.

Many parts of the frog's eye are brown in color.

This frog is critically endangered. Scientists attribute this to habitat loss for the sake of grazing and logging and because of pollution and lethality from fertilizers and pesticides. However, scientists also report that the population is small but appears to be holding steady instead of declining
