= Pseudophilautus schneideri =

Schneider's shrub frog

Scientific classification
- Kingdom: Animalia
- Phylum: Chordata
- Class: Amphibia
- Order: Anura
- Family: Rhacophoridae
- Genus: Pseudophilautus
- Species: P. schneideri

Binomial name
- Pseudophilautus schneideri Meegaskumbura & Manamendra-Arachchi, 2011

Species of amphibian

Pseudophilautus schneideri (Schneider's shrub frog) is a species of frogs in the family Rhacophoridae, endemic to Sri Lanka. People have seen it in only a few places: Kudawa, Pituwela, and Kanneliya. People have seen it between 1100 and 1400 meters above sea level.

The adult male frog measures 19.9 – 22.8 mm in snout-vent length and the adult female frog about 20.7 mm. The skin on the top of the frog's head is light brown and the skin on the sides of the frog's head is darker brown. The skin near the tympanum and intraorbital area is black in color. The skin of dorsum is dark brown in color with black spots and dark brown spots. The flanks are light brown with dark brown spots. The inguinal area is yellow-brown with dark brown spots. The sides of the legs are light brown with dark brown spots. All toes are light yellow-brown with some dark brown. The belly, chest, and throat are pale brown in color.

Scientists named this frog after herpetologist Professor Christopher J. Schneider of Boston University.

Scientists attribute the decline in this frog's population to habitat loss associated with agriculture, grazing, and logging.

== Original description ==
- Meegaskumbura M; Manamendra-Arachchi K (2011). "Two new species of shrub frogs (Rhacophoridae: Pseudophilautus) from Sri Lanka". Zootaxa. 2747: 1–18. doi:10.11646/zootaxa.2747.1.1.
