= Pseudophilautus sirilwijesundarai =

Siril Wijesundara's shrub frog

Conservation status
- Critically Endangered (IUCN 3.1)

Scientific classification
- Kingdom: Animalia
- Phylum: Chordata
- Class: Amphibia
- Order: Anura
- Family: Rhacophoridae
- Genus: Pseudophilautus
- Species: P. sirilwijesundarai

Binomial name
- Pseudophilautus sirilwijesundarai Wickramasinghe et al, 2013

Species of amphibian

Pseudophilautus sirilwijesundarai (Siril Wijesundara's shrub frog) is a species of frogs in the family Rhacophoridae, endemic to Sri Lanka. It is one of the 8 species of rhacophorids that were reported from Adam's Peak in 2013.

== Habitat and threats ==
Its natural habitats are wet lowland forests of Sri Lanka. It is threatened by habitat loss.

== Etymology ==
The frog was named after Dr. Siril Wijesundara, a leading Sri Lankan scientist and naturalist.

== Description ==
The adult male measures 22.3 mm in snout-vent length and the adult female 32.5 mm. The skin of the dorsum is dark brown in color with some green tinging. There are maroon spots on both sides of the body and a maroon mark under each eye. The sides of the body are maroon with yellow-white marks. There are maroon marks on all legs and toes. The throat is dark brown.

== Life cycle ==
Like other frogs in Pseudophilautus, this species undergoes direct development, hatching from eggs as small froglets with no free-swimming tadpole stage.

== Original publication ==
- Wickramasinghe; Vidanapathirana; Rajeev; Ariyarathne; Chanaka; Priyantha; Bandara; Wickramasinghe (2013). "Eight new species of Pseudophilautus (Amphibia: Anura: Rhacophoridae) from Sripada World Heritage Site (Peak Wilderness), a local amphibian hotspot in Sri Lanka." (PDF). J Threatened Taxa. 5 (4): 3789–3920. doi:10.11609/JoTT.o3099.3789-920. Archived from the original (PDF) on 2015-02-03.
