= Pseudophilautus steineri =

Conservation status
- Endangered (IUCN 3.1)

Scientific classification
- Kingdom: Animalia
- Phylum: Chordata
- Class: Amphibia
- Order: Anura
- Family: Rhacophoridae
- Genus: Pseudophilautus
- Species: P. steineri

Binomial name
- Pseudophilautus steineri (Meegaskumbura & Manamendra-Arachchi, 2005)

Synonyms
- Philautus steineri Meegaskumbura & Manamendra-Arachchi, 2005

Species of amphibian

Pseudophilautus steineri, known as Steiner's shrub frog, is a species of frogs in the family Rhacophoridae. It is endemic to Sri Lanka. Its natural habitat is subtropical or tropical moist montane forests. It is also threatened by habitat loss. In a 2020 assessment, the IUCN assessed this species as Endangered.

== Habitat ==
Steiner's Shrub Frog (Pseudophilautus steineri) inhabits high elevations within the Knuckles Range. It primarily resides in closed-canopy habitats among the leaf-litter, shrubs, and sub-canopy trees. Males (Note: Primarily of this species.) are frequently observed calling from branches positioned 0.3 to 3 meters above the ground. These frogs engage in presumed breeding by means of direct development. They also exhibit a low tolerance for habitat disturbance as they heavily rely on the presence of canopies for cover.

== Taxonomy ==
Steiner's Shrub Frog (Pseudophilautus steineri) is a species of frog belonging to the family Rhacophoridae. The genus Pseudophilautus is recognized for its diversity within the shrub frog group, and Steiner's Shrub Frog is no exception. Taxonomically, it falls within the Anura order and the Amphibia class. The scientific nomenclature is derived from the Greek "pseudes" meaning "false," and "philaute" meaning "to be charmed." This nomenclature reflects the unique and charming characteristics of these frogs. Steiner's Shrub Frog, like many amphibians, is intricately classified based on its morphological and genetic traits, contributing to our understanding of its evolutionary relationships within the broader context of amphibian biodiversity.

== Threats ==
=== Habitat Destruction and Human Activities ===
The Knuckles Mountain Forest Reserve (KMFR), the natural habitat of the Steiner's Shrub Frog, is under severe and imminent threats. These include extensive agricultural practices, particularly illegal cardamom plantations and pollution resulting from pesticide use. Much of the primary forest in the KMFR has been cleared to make way for cash-crop cultivation, including tea and cardamom, which leads to the gathering of wood for processing and drying barns, as well as timber and fuelwood supply for villages. Additionally, unregulated research, resort and building construction, uncontrolled tourism access, and human-set forest fires are further endangering the forest reserve.

=== Climate Change and Aridification ===
Climate change poses a significant threat to the Steiner's Shrub Frog. Annual rainfall is declining steeply in the region, especially on the perhumid western slopes, causing the area to become drier and more seasonal. Factors contributing to this change include a reduction in annual rainfall, changes in rainfall distribution, and increasing temperatures. These climatic shifts elevate the risk of forest fires, which are unnatural in rainforests. As these frogs rely on ambient forest moisture for homeostasis and reproduction, highland aridification and warming pose serious potential threats to these species.

=== Forest Dieback and Environmental Stressors ===
The phenomenon of forest dieback, characterized by extensive stands of woody vegetation perishing, presents an additional threat. Despite numerous studies, the exact cause remains unknown. There is a concern that this environmental stressor might harm amphibians and disrupt their suitable habitats. High acidity in mist- and rainwater is considered a potential risk to the highland biota, although there is no direct evidence of its negative impact on amphibians to date. This threat is particularly relevant to species residing in areas with persistent mist and those inhabiting open habitats with aquatic life history stages.
