= Pseudophilautus dimbullae =

Conservation status
- Extinct (IUCN 3.1)

Scientific classification
- Kingdom: Animalia
- Phylum: Chordata
- Class: Amphibia
- Order: Anura
- Family: Rhacophoridae
- Genus: Pseudophilautus
- Species: †P. dimbullae

Binomial name
- †Pseudophilautus dimbullae (Shreve, 1940)

Synonyms
- Rhacophorus dimbullae Shreve, 1940; Philautus dimbullae (Shreve, 1940)

Extinct species of amphibian

Pseudophilautus dimbullae was a species of frog in the family Rhacophoridae. It was endemic to Sri Lanka. It is only known from the holotype collected in 1933.

== Description ==
The holotype is an adult female measuring 45 mm (1.8 in) in snout–vent length. The body is elongate. The snout is truncate in lateral profile. The tympanum is visible and oblique. The supratympanic fold is prominent. The canthal edges are sharp. Skin is dorsally shagreened, becoming granular on the lower flanks and on the ventral side of the body. The fingers have rudimentary webbing whereas the toes are medially webbed. The upper parts of the alcohol-preserved specimen are brown with some darker markings. The upper lip is light brown whereas the lower lip is yellow. The underside is yellow.

== Distribution and conservation ==
The holotype was collected in 1933 from "Queenwood Estate, Dimbulla, Ceylon" at 1,500 m (4,900 ft) above sea level. No other specimens are known, despite extensive field surveys, also at the type locality. The habitat requirements of this species are unknown. The reasons for its demise are also unknown, but probably involve habitat loss.

Pseudophilautus dimbullae is only known from Queenwood Estate, Dimbulla.
