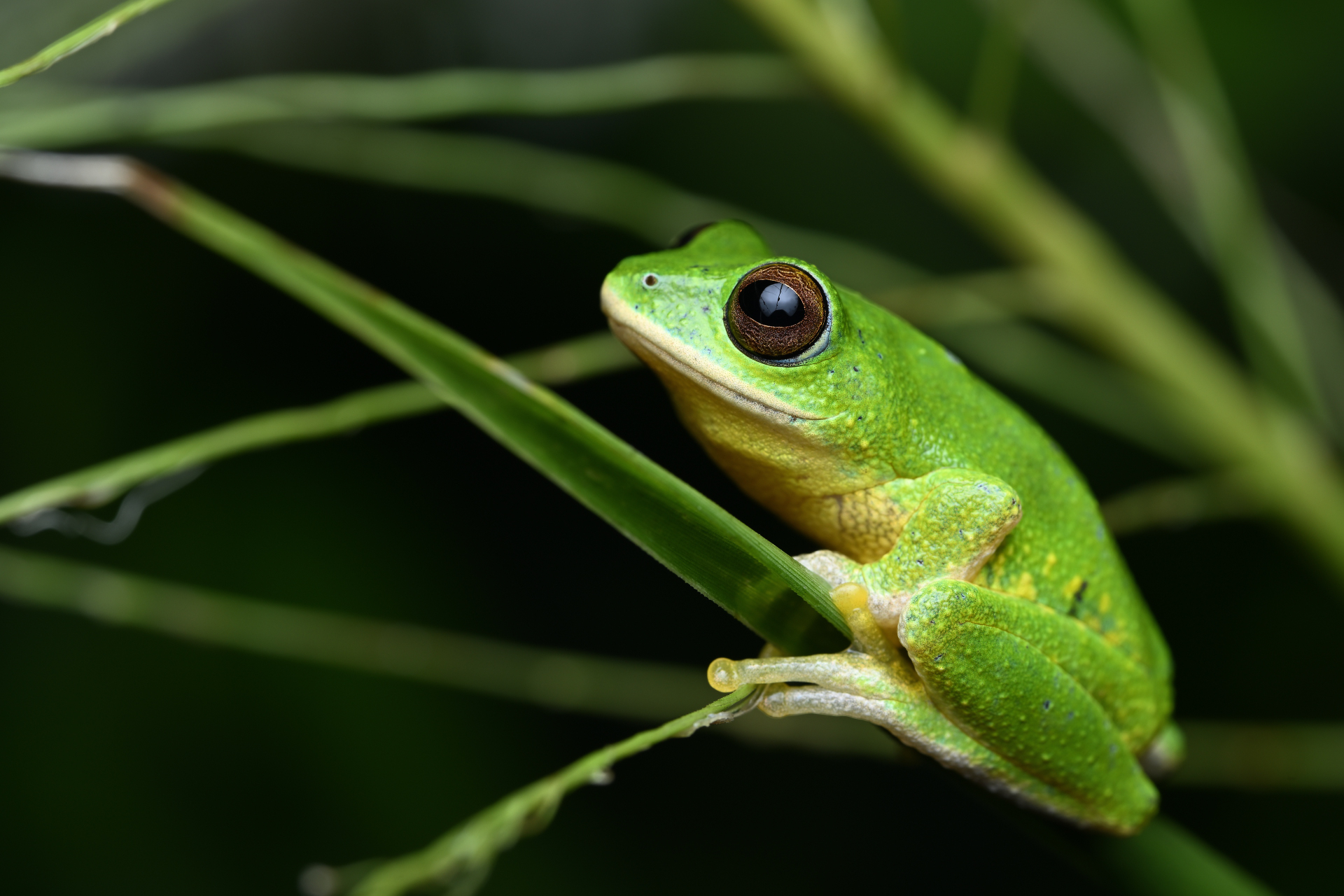

Conservation status
- Critically Endangered (IUCN 3.1)

Scientific classification
- Kingdom: Animalia
- Phylum: Chordata
- Class: Amphibia
- Order: Anura
- Family: Rhacophoridae
- Genus: Pseudophilautus
- Species: P. ocularis

Binomial name
- Pseudophilautus ocularis (Manamendra-Arachchi & Pethiyagoda, 2004)

Synonyms
- Philautus ocularis Manamendra-Arachchi & Pethiyagoda, 2004

= Pseudophilautus ocularis =

Species of amphibian

Pseudophilautus ocularis, known as golden-eyed shrub frog is a species of frogs in the family Rhacophoridae.

It is endemic to Sri Lanka. It has been observed in the Sinharaja World Heritage Site, between 1060 and 1270 meters above sea level.

Its natural habitats are subtropical or tropical moist lowland forests, subtropical or tropical moist montane forests, plantations, and heavily degraded former forest. It is threatened by habitat loss.
