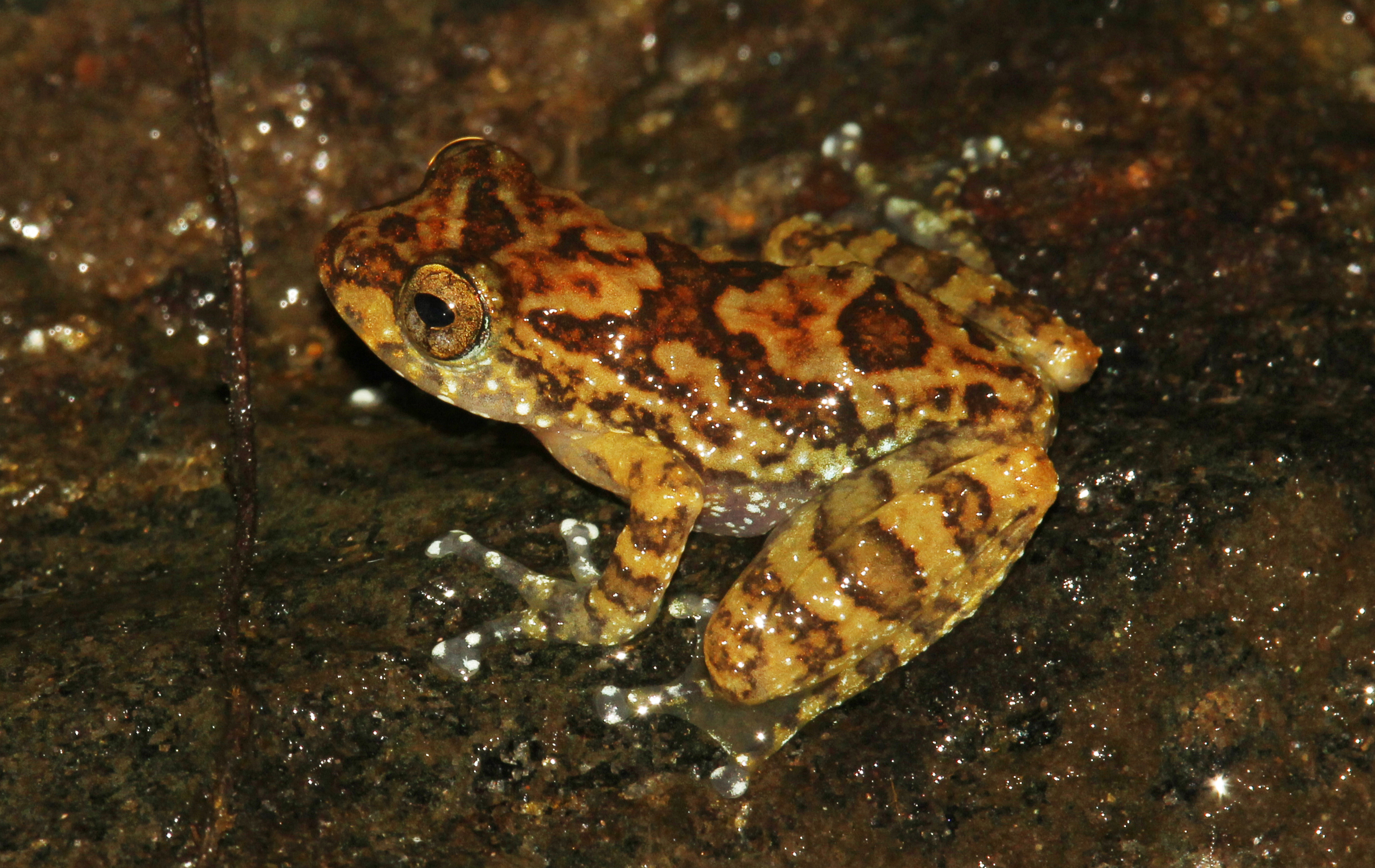

Conservation status
- Endangered (IUCN 3.1)

Scientific classification
- Kingdom: Animalia
- Phylum: Chordata
- Class: Amphibia
- Order: Anura
- Family: Rhacophoridae
- Genus: Pseudophilautus
- Species: P. macropus

Binomial name
- Pseudophilautus macropus (Günther, 1868)

Synonyms
- Philautus macropus (Günther, 1869)

= Pseudophilautus macropus =

Species of frog

Pseudophilautus macropus, commonly known as the bigfoot shrub frog, is a species of frog in the family Rhacophoridae. It is endemic to Sri Lanka.

Its natural habitats include subtropical or tropical moist lowland forests and plantations.

The species is threatened by habitat loss.
