= Pseudophilautus silvaticus =

Conservation status
- Endangered (IUCN 3.1)

Scientific classification
- Kingdom: Animalia
- Phylum: Chordata
- Class: Amphibia
- Order: Anura
- Family: Rhacophoridae
- Genus: Pseudophilautus
- Species: P. silvaticus

Binomial name
- Pseudophilautus silvaticus (Manamendra-Arachchi & Pethiyagoda, 2005)

Synonyms
- Philautus silvaticus Manamendra-Arachchi & Pethiyagoda, 2005

Species of amphibian

Pseudophilautus silvaticus, known as forest shrub frog is a species of frogs in the family Rhacophoridae.

It is endemic to Sri Lanka.

Its natural habitats are subtropical or tropical moist lowland forests, subtropical or tropical moist montane forests, plantations, and heavily degraded former forest. It is threatened by habitat loss.
