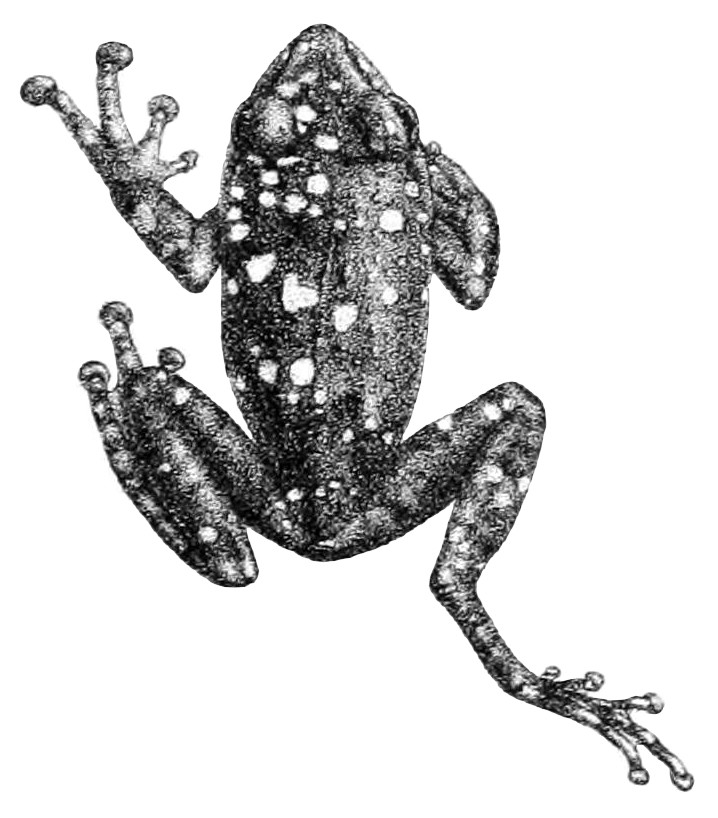

Conservation status
- Extinct (IUCN 3.1)

Scientific classification
- Kingdom: Animalia
- Phylum: Chordata
- Class: Amphibia
- Order: Anura
- Family: Rhacophoridae
- Genus: Pseudophilautus
- Species: †P. adspersus

Binomial name
- †Pseudophilautus adspersus (Günther, 1872)

Synonyms
- Ixalus adspersus Günther, 1872; Rhacophorus adspersus (Günther, 1872); Philautus adspersus (Günther, 1872)

= Pseudophilautus adspersus =

Extinct species of amphibian

Pseudophilautus adspersus is an extinct species of frog in the family Rhacophoridae. It was endemic to Sri Lanka.

== Description ==
Females 33.3–41.7 mm. Head flattened dorsally. Tympanum described as distinct by Günther (1872) but outer rim is not discernible in preserved holotype. Prominent supratympanic fold. Snout angled at 105 degrees, laterally truncated, with sharp canthi and flattened loreal region and internarial region. Vomerine teeth and lingual papilla are absent. Calcar lacking. Supernumerary tubercles on both palm and sole. Fingers have lateral dermal fringe but lack webbing. Medially webbed toes. No tarsal fold. Warty skin texture on anterior dorsum, while the posterior dorsum is smooth. Dorsal forelimb has glandular warts. Smooth granular skin on throat and underside of thigh, and rough granular skin on chest and belly. Flanks and feet are granular (Manamendra-Arachchi and Pethiyagoda 2005).

== Distribution and habitat ==
Pseudophilautus adspersus was endemic to Sri Lanka. The holotype has the non-specific type locality "Ceylon", while the second specimen was collected at Nuwara Eliya, a resort town and tea-growing area at 1,700–2,500 m in the central mountainous region of Sri Lanka (Manamendra-Arachchi and Pethiyagoda 2005). The exact habitat that this species required is not known (Stuart et al. 2008).
