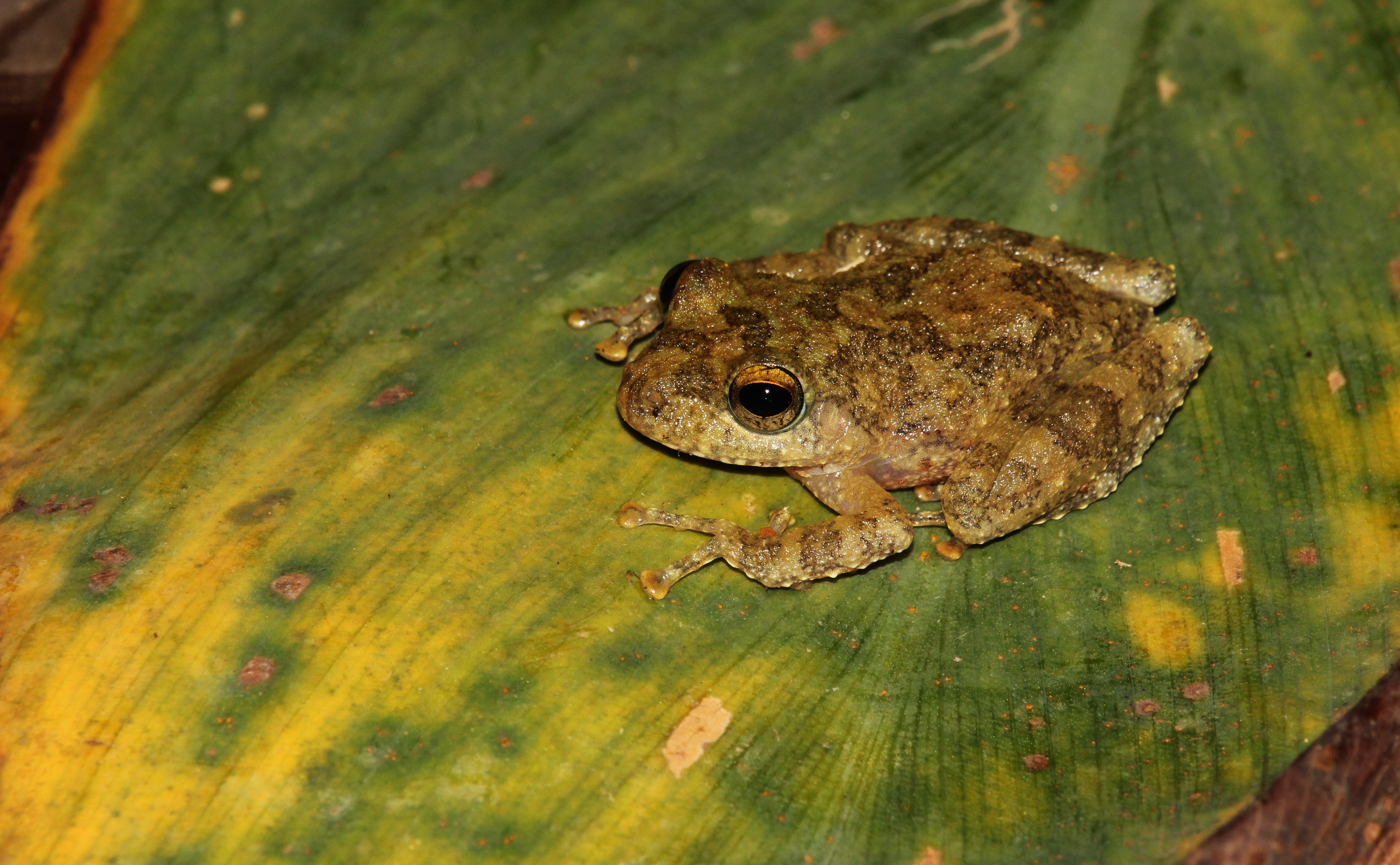

Conservation status
- Least Concern (IUCN 3.1)

Scientific classification
- Kingdom: Animalia
- Phylum: Chordata
- Class: Amphibia
- Order: Anura
- Family: Rhacophoridae
- Genus: Pseudophilautus
- Species: P. fergusonianus

Binomial name
- Pseudophilautus fergusonianus (Ahl, 1927)

Synonyms
- Philautus fergusonianus (Ahl, 1927)

= Pseudophilautus fergusonianus =

Species of frog

Pseudophilautus fergusonianus, known as Ferguson's shrub frog is a species of frog in the family Rhacophoridae. It is endemic to Sri Lanka.

Its natural habitats are subtropical or tropical moist lowland forests, subtropical or tropical moist montane forests, plantations, rural gardens, and heavily degraded former forest.
