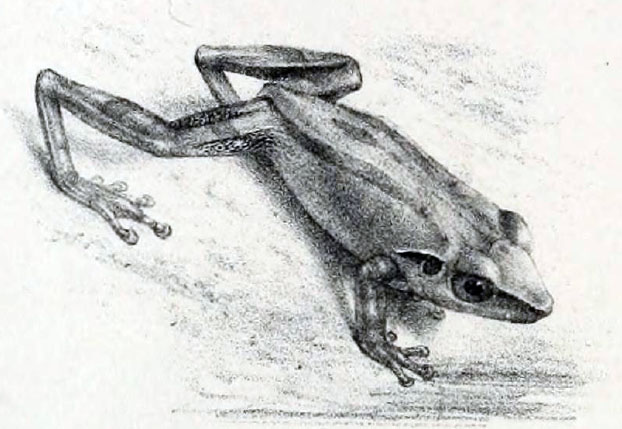
- Pseudophilautus stictomerus from Günther's original description

Conservation status
- Vulnerable (IUCN 3.1)

Scientific classification
- Kingdom: Animalia
- Phylum: Chordata
- Class: Amphibia
- Order: Anura
- Family: Rhacophoridae
- Genus: Pseudophilautus
- Species: P. stictomerus

Binomial name
- Pseudophilautus stictomerus (Günther, 1876)

Synonyms
- Ixalus stictomerus Günther, "1875" 1876; Philautus stictomerus (Günther, 1876)

= Pseudophilautus stictomerus =

Species of amphibian

Pseudophilautus stictomerus (common name: orange-canthal shrub frog) is a species of frog in the family Rhacophoridae. It is endemic to Sri Lanka. It was first described by Albert Günther (as Ixalus stictomerus) based on a single individual collected by Colonel Richard Henry Beddome from 'Ceylon'.

== Description ==
Male Pseudophilautus stictomerus measure about 23 mm (0.91 in) in snout-vent length of and females 25–36 mm (0.98–1.42 in). They have an elongated body with an obtusely pointed snout. The dorsum is dark brown. There is a narrow yellow stripe on mid-dorsum from tip of snout to vent. There are also bright orange stripes running along the canthal edges, edges of upper eyelids, and supratympanic folds.

== Distribution and habitat ==
Pseudophilautus stictomerus is a low-country wetzone species from south-western Sri Lanka. It is a habitat generalist found in both open (anthropogenic) and closed canopy habitats at elevations of 60–515 m (197–1,690 ft) above sea level. They are commonly found on shrubs some 1 metre above ground. The species is potentially threatened by agro-chemical pollution and habitat loss and alteration.
