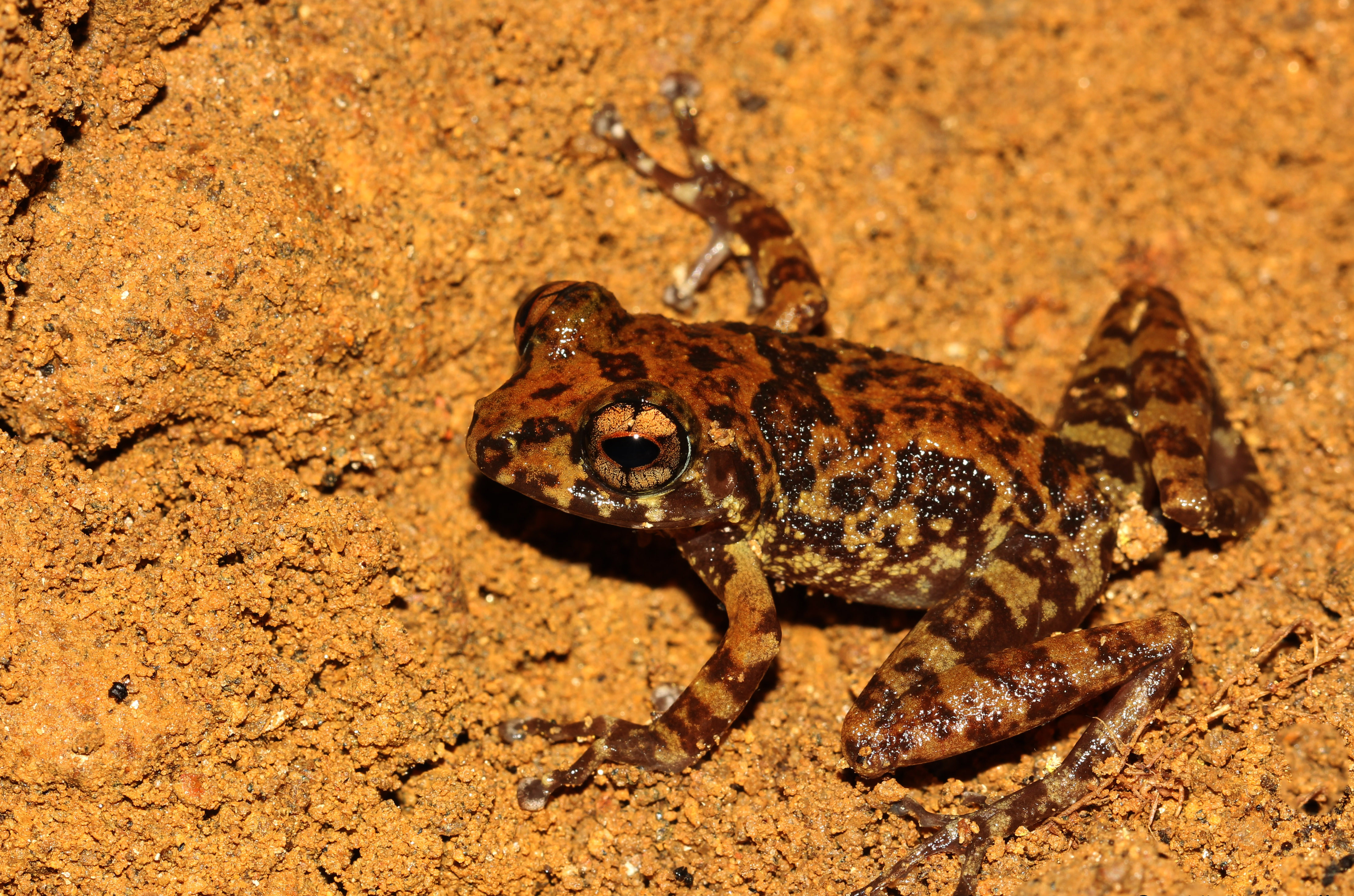

Conservation status
- Vulnerable (IUCN 3.1)

Scientific classification
- Kingdom: Animalia
- Phylum: Chordata
- Class: Amphibia
- Order: Anura
- Family: Rhacophoridae
- Genus: Pseudophilautus
- Species: P. sordidus

Binomial name
- Pseudophilautus sordidus (Manamendra-Arachchi & Pethiyagoda, 2005)

Synonyms
- Philautus sordidus Manamendra-Arachchi & Pethiyagoda, 2005

= Pseudophilautus sordidus =

Species of amphibian

Pseudophilautus sordidus, commonly known as the grubby shrub frog is a species of frog in the family Rhacophoridae.

It is endemic to Sri Lanka.

Its natural habitats are subtropical or tropical moist lowland forests, subtropical or tropical moist montane forests, rivers, plantations, rural gardens, and heavily degraded former forest. It is becoming rarer due to habitat loss.
