= Pseudophilautus bambaradeniyai =

Bambaradeniya's shrub frog

Conservation status
- Critically Endangered (IUCN 3.1)

Scientific classification
- Kingdom: Animalia
- Phylum: Chordata
- Class: Amphibia
- Order: Anura
- Family: Rhacophoridae
- Genus: Pseudophilautus
- Species: P. bambaradeniyai

Binomial name
- Pseudophilautus bambaradeniyai Wickramasinghe et al, 2013

Species of amphibian

Pseudophilautus bambaradeniyai (Bambaradeniya's shrub frog) is a species of frogs in the family Rhacophoridae, endemic to Sri Lanka. Scientists know it from the type locality: Sripada Peak, Peak Wilderness, between 700 and 1400 meters above sea level.

Its natural habitats are wet lowland forests of Sri Lanka. It is threatened by habitat loss. It is one of the 8 species of rhacophorids that was discovered from Adam's Peak recently.

== Etymology ==
The frog was named after Dr. Channa Bambaradeniya, a leading Sri Lankan scientist and naturalist.

== Description ==
The adult male frog measures about 17.3 – 20.2 mm in snout-vent length. The skin of the dorsum is dark brown in color with brown-black blotches. There is a dark cross-shaped mark between the eyes. The most striking feature of this species to distinguish easily by the creamy stripe running through the vertebral column from tip of the snout to tail end.

== Original description ==
- Wickramasinghe LJM; Vidanapathirana DR; Rajeev MDG; Ariyarathne SC; Chanaka AWA; Priyantha LLD; Bandara IN; Wickramasinghe N. (2013). "Eight new species of Pseudophilautus (Amphibia: Anura: Rhacophoridae) from Sripada World Heritage Site (Peak Wilderness), a local amphibian hotspot in Sri Lanka". J Threatened Taxa. 5 (4): 3789–3920. doi:10.11609/JoTT.o3099.3789-920.
