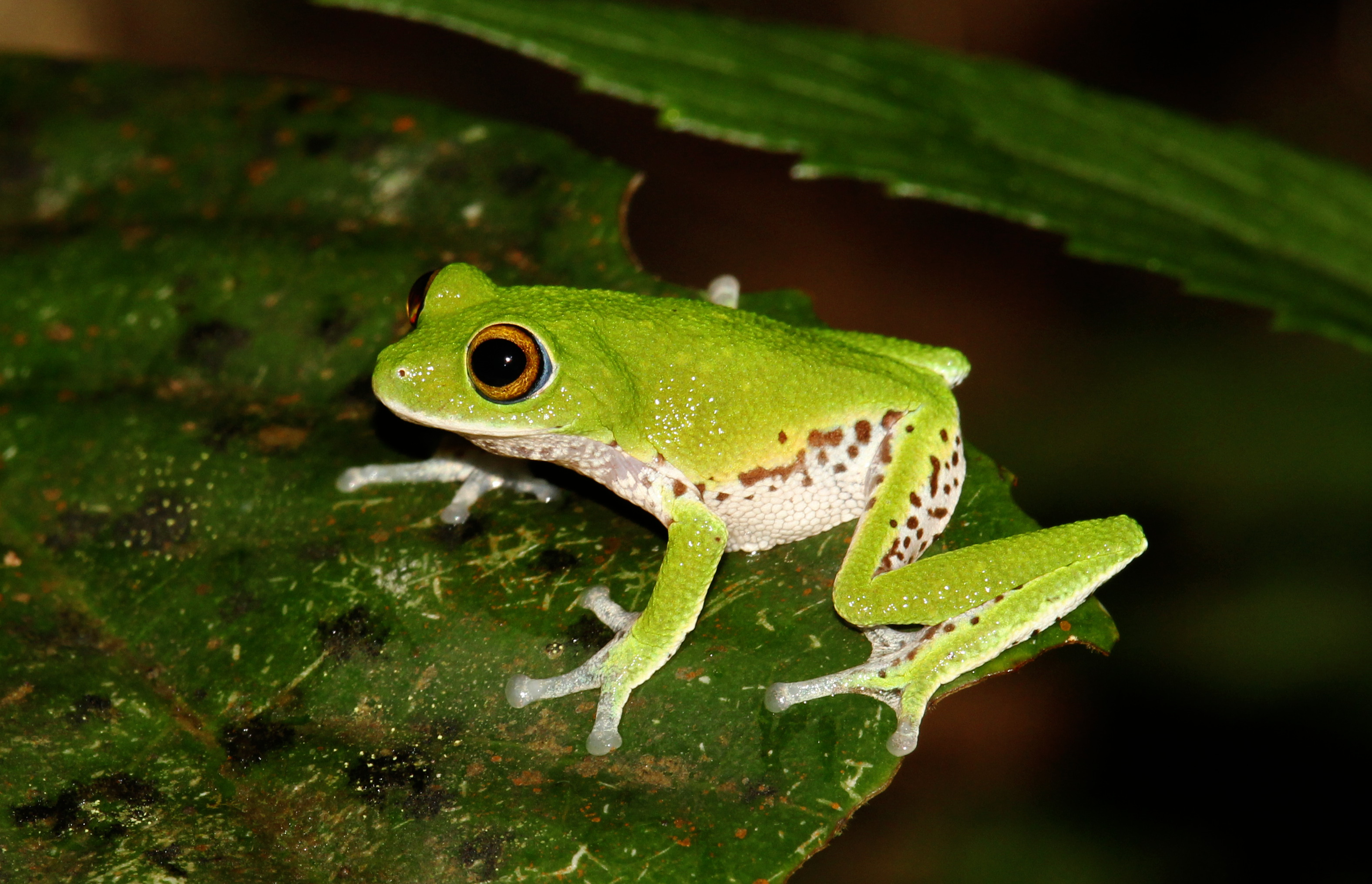

Conservation status
- Critically Endangered (IUCN 3.1)

Scientific classification
- Kingdom: Animalia
- Phylum: Chordata
- Class: Amphibia
- Order: Anura
- Family: Rhacophoridae
- Genus: Pseudophilautus
- Species: P. mooreorum

Binomial name
- Pseudophilautus mooreorum (Meegaskumbura & Manamendra-Arachchi, 2005)

Synonyms
- Philautus mooreorum Meegaskumbura & Manamendra-Arachchi, 2005

= Pseudophilautus mooreorum =

Species of amphibian

Pseudophilautus mooreorum, commonly known as Moore's shrub frog, is a species of frog in the family Rhacophoridae. It is endemic to Sri Lanka.

Its natural habitat is subtropical or tropical moist montane forests. Scientists have observed it in the Knuckles Hills between 1100 and 1245 meters above sea level.

The adult male frog measures 29.4 – 31.3 mm in snout-vent length and the adult female 33.8 – 35.0 mm. The frog's head is a bright, luminous green color. The flanks are yellow and white in color. Parts of the mouth are white in color. The tops of the hind legs are green in color, and parts of the tops of the back legs are white in color. The toes of all four feet are white in color. This frog has disks on its toes for climbing. They are white in color.

This frog lives on shrubs. Scientists have seen the male frogs sitting in the shrubs in the understory 1–3 meters above the ground. They live in cloud forests where the trees form a closed canopy.

Like other frogs in Pseudophilautus, they grow through direct development, hatching as froglets rather than a free-swimming tadpole stage.

This frog is critically endangered. It is threatened by habitat loss. Scientists attribute this to urbanization, increased farming and pasturage, and logging.

== Original publication ==
- Meegaskumbura M; Manamendra-Arachchi K (2005). "Description of eight new species of shrub frogs (Ranidae: Rhacophorinae: Philautus) from Sri Lanka". Raffles Bull Zool Suppl. 12: 305–338.
