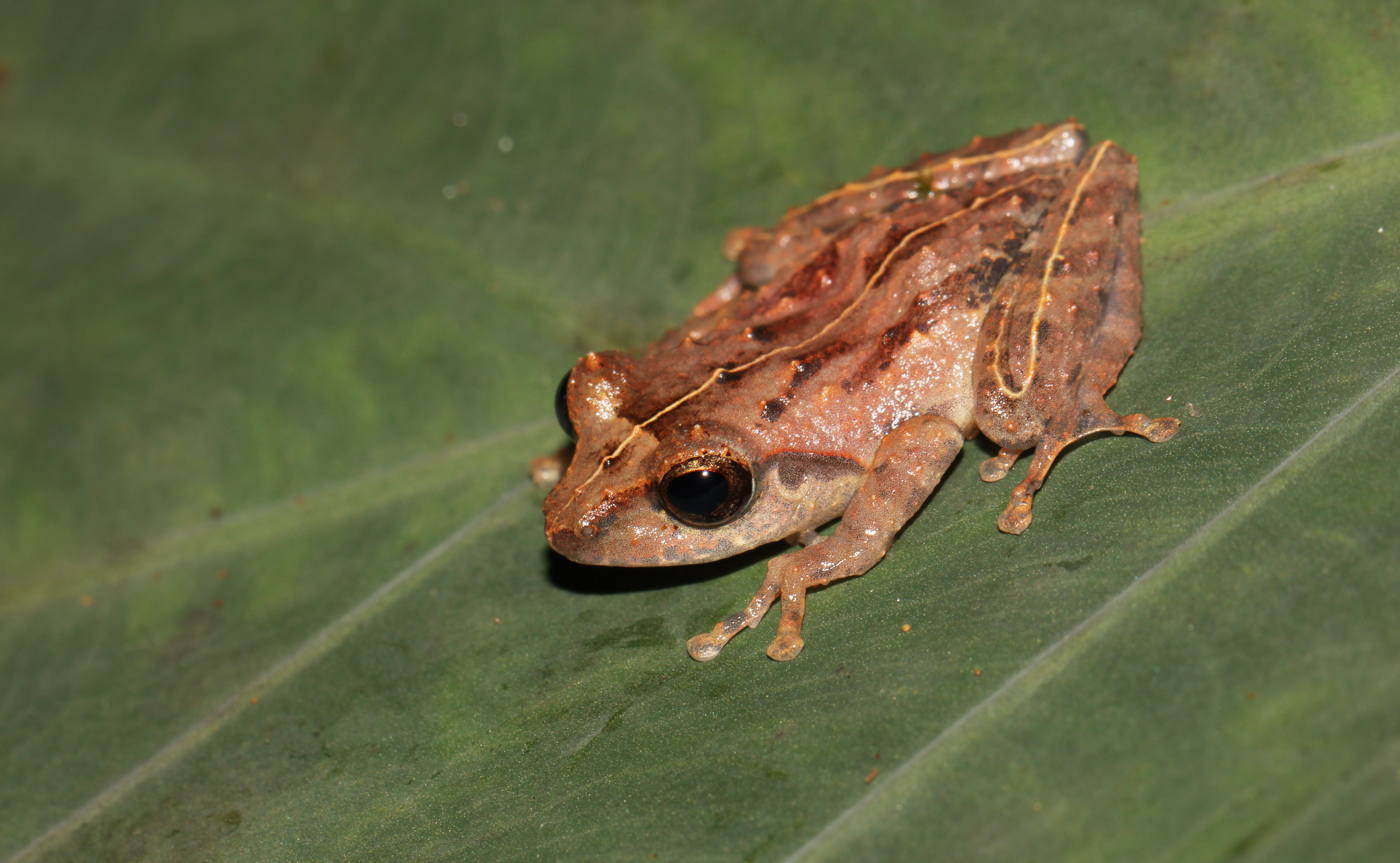

Conservation status
- Endangered (IUCN 3.1)

Scientific classification
- Kingdom: Animalia
- Phylum: Chordata
- Class: Amphibia
- Order: Anura
- Family: Rhacophoridae
- Genus: Pseudophilautus
- Species: P. nemus

Binomial name
- Pseudophilautus nemus (Manamendra-Arachchi & Pethiyagoda, 2004)

Synonyms
- Philautus nemus Manamendra-Arachchi & Pethiyagoda, 2004

= Pseudophilautus nemus =

Species of amphibian

Pseudophilautus nemus, known as whistling shrub frog, is a species of frogs in the family Rhacophoridae.

It is endemic to Sri Lanka. It has been observed in the Haycock Hill Forest Reserve, and the Kanneliya Forest, between 60 and 660 meters above sea level.

Its natural habitat is subtropical or tropical moist lowland forests. It is threatened by habitat loss.
