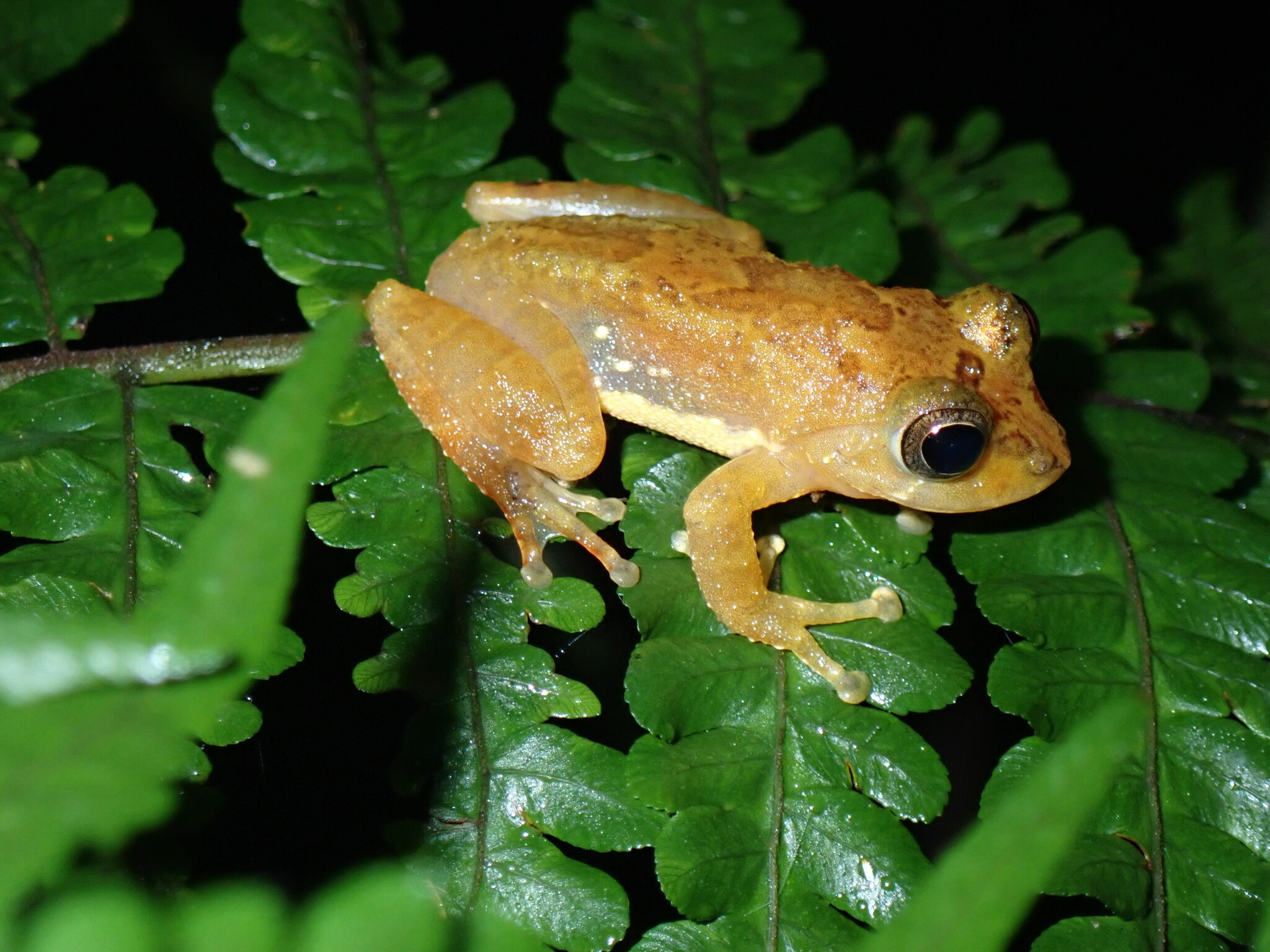

Conservation status
- Endangered (IUCN 3.1)

Scientific classification
- Kingdom: Animalia
- Phylum: Chordata
- Class: Amphibia
- Order: Anura
- Family: Rhacophoridae
- Genus: Pseudophilautus
- Species: P. sarasinorum

Binomial name
- Pseudophilautus sarasinorum (Müller, 1887)

Synonyms
- Philautus sarasinorum (Müller, 1887)

= Pseudophilautus sarasinorum =

Species of frog

Pseudophilautus sarasinorum is a species of frog in the family Rhacophoridae. It is endemic to Sri Lanka.

Its natural habitats are subtropical or tropical moist montane forests and rivers. It is threatened by habitat loss.
