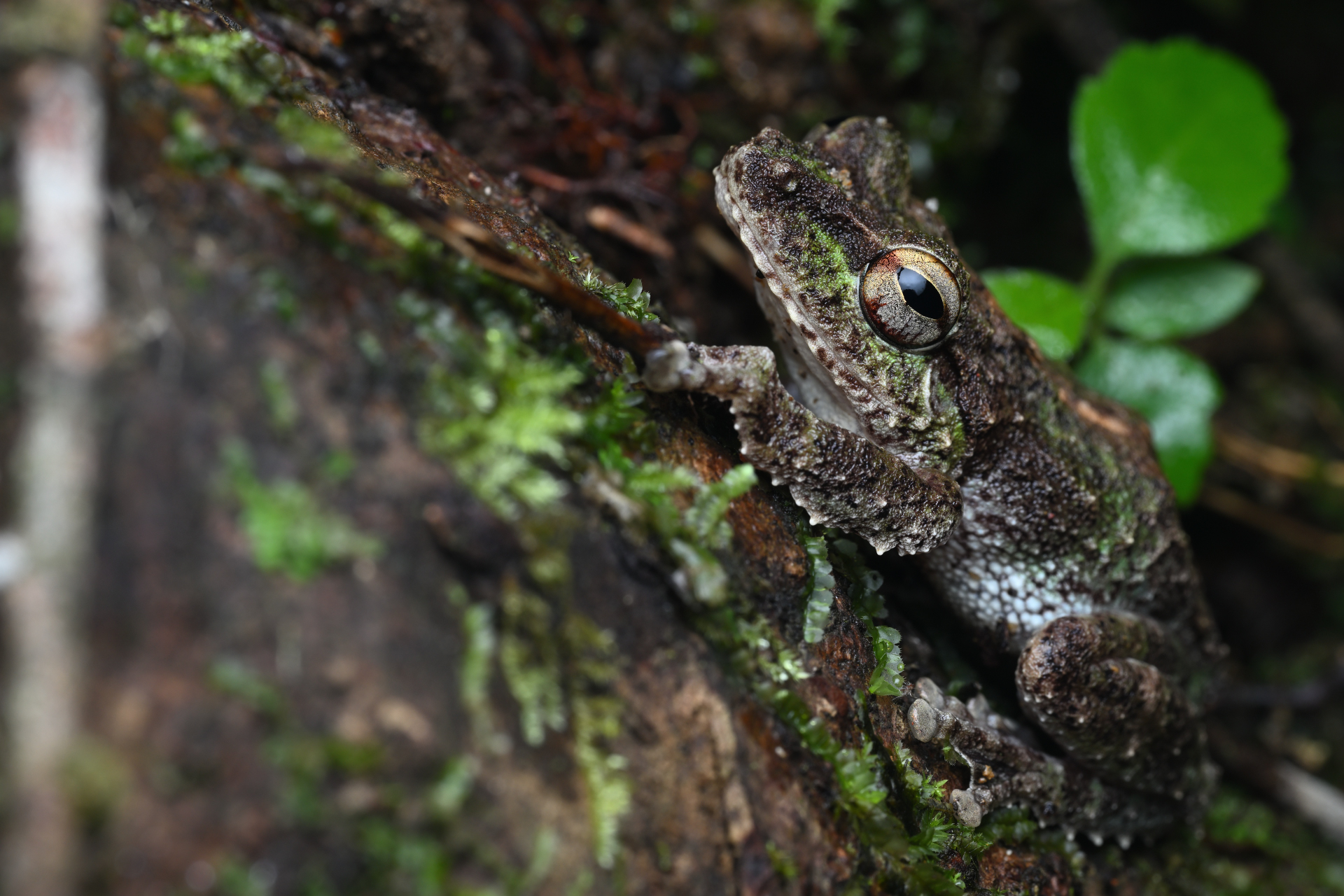

Conservation status
- Vulnerable (IUCN 3.1)

Scientific classification
- Kingdom: Animalia
- Phylum: Chordata
- Class: Amphibia
- Order: Anura
- Family: Rhacophoridae
- Genus: Pseudophilautus
- Species: P. cavirostris

Binomial name
- Pseudophilautus cavirostris (Günther, 1869)

Synonyms
- Philautus cavirostris (Günther, 1869)

= Pseudophilautus cavirostris =

Species of frog

Pseudophilautus cavirostris, commonly called hollow-snouted shrub frog, is a species of frog in the family Rhacophoridae. It is endemic to Sri Lanka.

Its natural habitats are subtropical or tropical moist lowland forests and subtropical or tropical moist montane forests. It is threatened by habitat loss.
