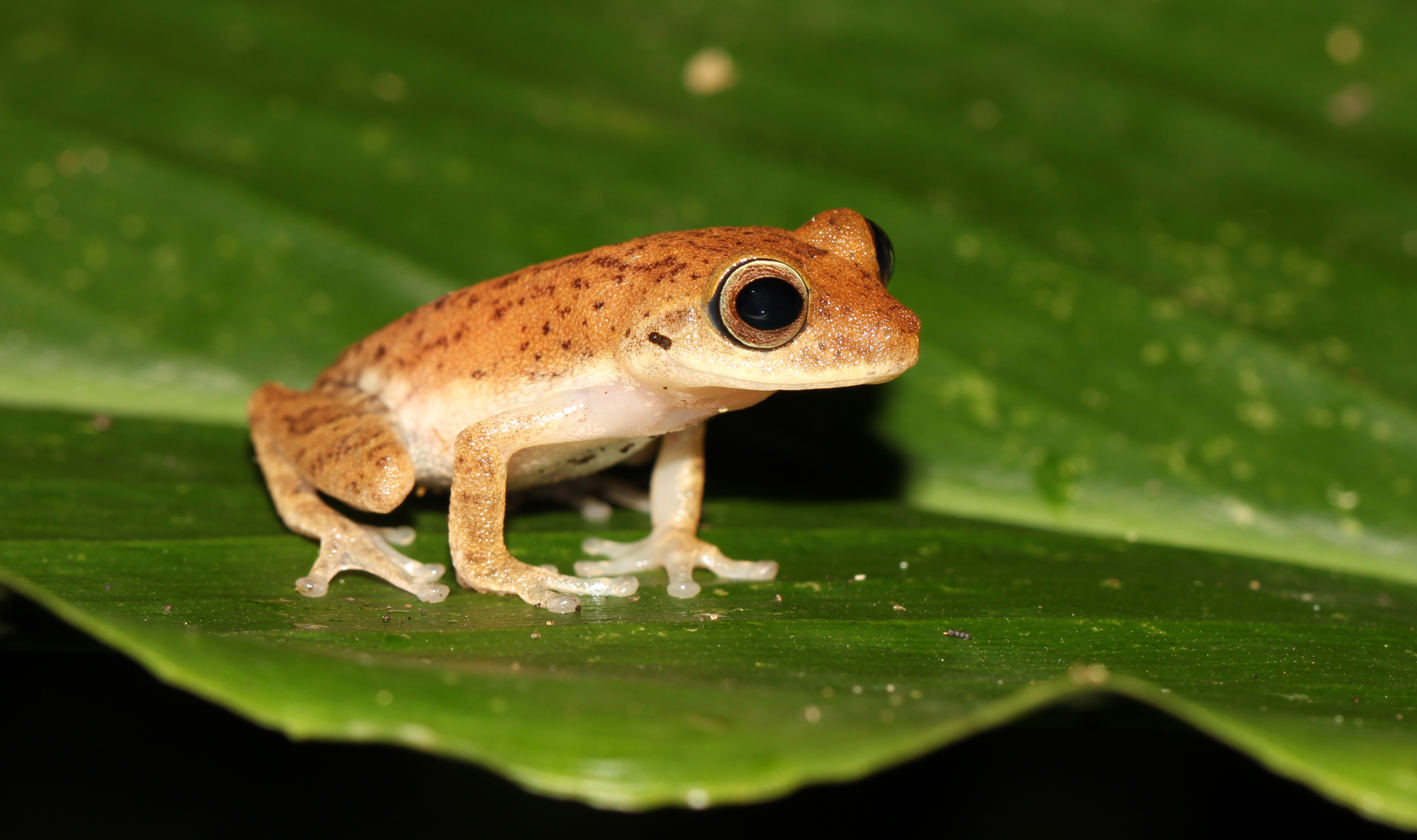

Conservation status
- Endangered (IUCN 3.1)

Scientific classification
- Kingdom: Animalia
- Phylum: Chordata
- Class: Amphibia
- Order: Anura
- Family: Rhacophoridae
- Genus: Pseudophilautus
- Species: P. auratus

Binomial name
- Pseudophilautus auratus (Manamendra-Arachchi & Pethiyagoda, 2005)

Synonyms
- Philautus auratus Manamendra-Arachchi & Pethiyagoda, 2005

= Pseudophilautus auratus =

Species of frog

Pseudophilautus auratus, commonly called golden shrub frog, is a species of frog in the family Rhacophoridae, endemic to Sri Lanka, where it lives in closed-canopy cloud forests between 513 and 1270 meters above sea level, including the Sinharaja World Heritage Site and Kanneliya Forest.

Its natural habitats are subtropical or tropical moist lowland forests, subtropical or tropical moist montane forests, and plantations. It is threatened by habitat loss.
