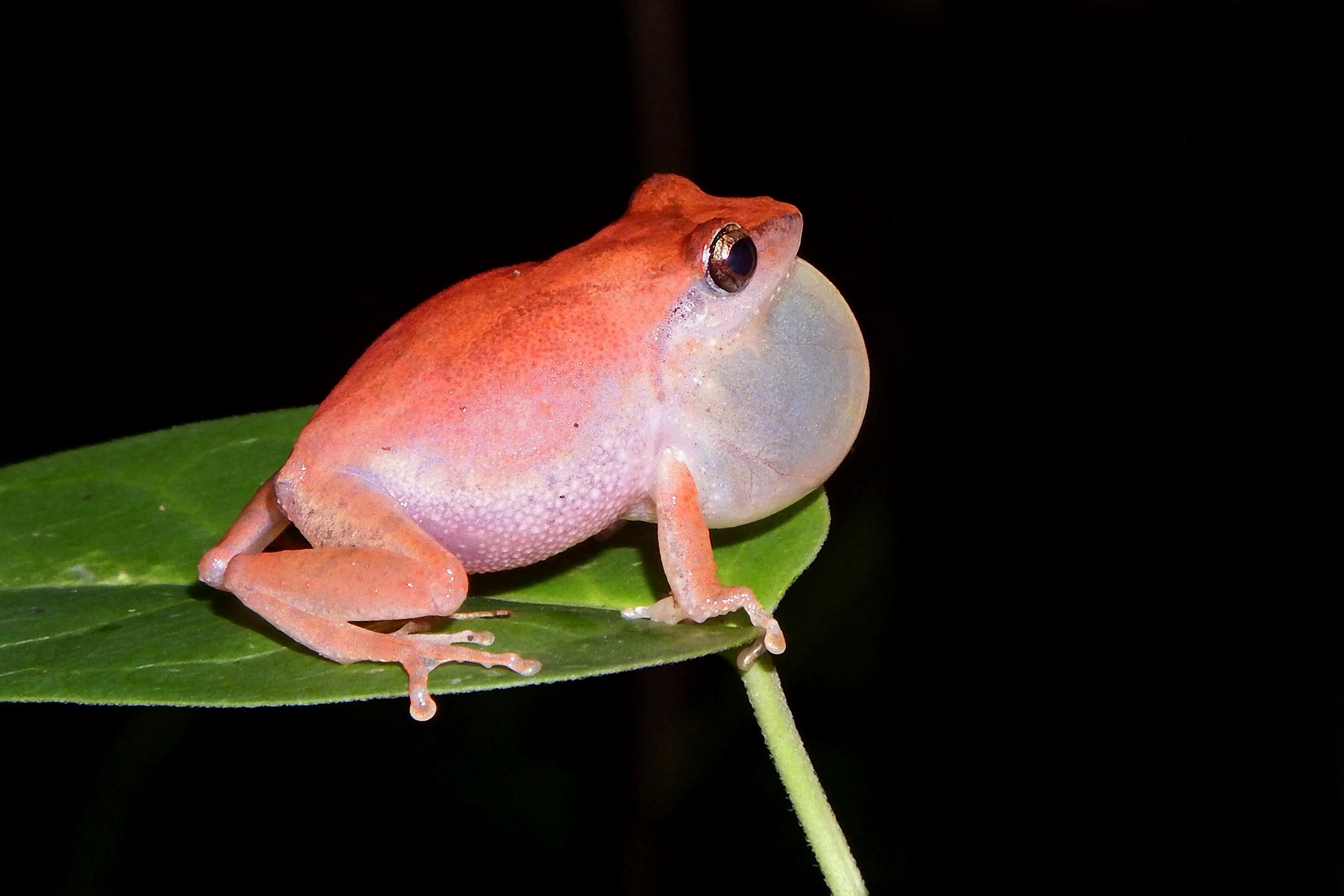

Conservation status
- Least Concern (IUCN 3.1)

Scientific classification
- Kingdom: Animalia
- Phylum: Chordata
- Class: Amphibia
- Order: Anura
- Family: Rhacophoridae
- Genus: Pseudophilautus
- Species: P. kani

Binomial name
- Pseudophilautus kani (Biju & Bossuyt, 2009)

Synonyms
- Philautus kani Biju & Bossuyt, 2009

= Kani bushfrog =

Species of frog

The kani bushfrog or kani brown-eared shrub frog (Pseudophilautus kani) is a small shrub frog species of the genus Pseudophilautus. It is endemic to India, where it has been observed in the Western Ghat mountains and Tamil mountains. The Kani bushfrog has a unique brownish coloration with a distinctive dark patch near its ear, aiding in its camouflage ( Moving or acting in a way that avoids detection ) within forest habitats. The Kani bushfrog is named after the Kani tribal community of Kerala, which played a key role in its discovery.

== Original description ==
- Biju SD; Bossuyt F (2009). "Systematics and phylogeny of Philautus Gistel, 1848 (Anura, Rhacophoridae) in the Western Ghats of India, with descriptions of 12 new species". Zool J Linn Soc (abstract). 155 (2): 374–444. doi:10.1111/j.1096-3642.2008.00466.x.
