= Pseudophilautus mittermeieri =

Conservation status
- Vulnerable (IUCN 3.1)

Scientific classification
- Kingdom: Animalia
- Phylum: Chordata
- Class: Amphibia
- Order: Anura
- Family: Rhacophoridae
- Genus: Pseudophilautus
- Species: P. mittermeieri

Binomial name
- Pseudophilautus mittermeieri (Meegaskumbura & Manamendra-Arachchi, 2005)

Synonyms
- Philautus mittermeieri Meegaskumbura & Manamendra-Arachchi, 2005

Species of frog

Pseudophilautus mittermeieri, commonly known as Mittermeier's shrub frog, is a species of frog in the family Rhacophoridae. It is endemic to Sri Lanka.

Its natural habitat is subtropical or tropical moist lowland forests. Scientists have seen it between 60 and 150 meters above sea level.

The adult male frog measures 16.3 – 18.4 mm in snout-vent length. The skin of the dorsum is gray-green in color with orange tubercules on the head and some orange color on the back. The flanks are ashy yellow in color with dark brown marks. Parts of the belly are ashy yellow in color. The bottoms of the toes of the front feet are gray in color.

This species is threatened by habitat loss. Scientists attribute this to urbanization, increased land usage for farms, grazing, and logging.

Scientists named this frog for Russell Mittermeier, who served as President of Conservation International.

== Original publication ==
- Meegaskumbura M; Manamendra-Arachchi K (2005). "Description of eight new species of shrub frogs (Ranidae: Rhacophorinae: Philautus) from Sri Lanka". Raffles Bull Zool Suppl. 12: 305–338.
