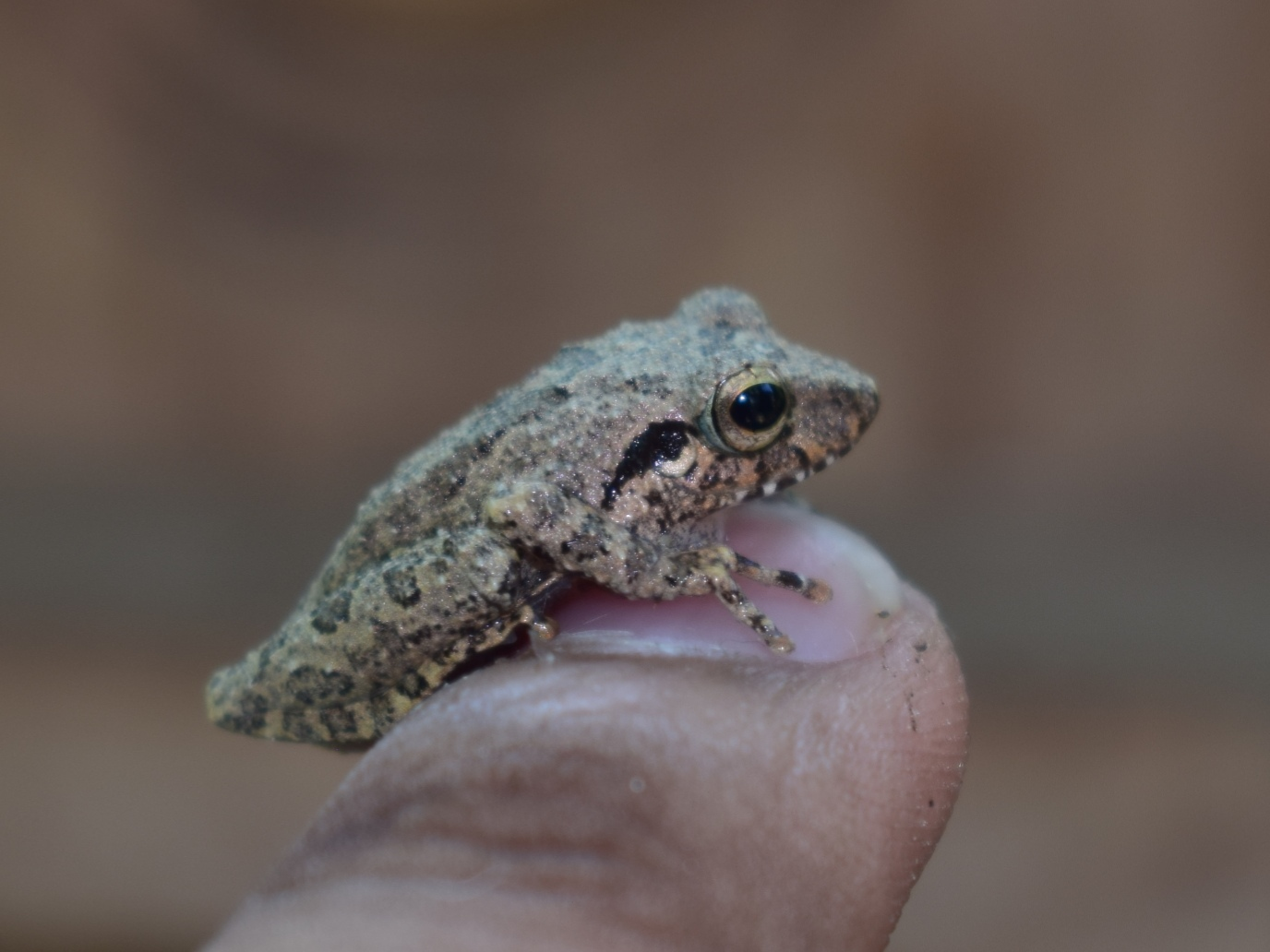

Conservation status
- Least Concern (IUCN 3.1)

Scientific classification
- Kingdom: Animalia
- Phylum: Chordata
- Class: Amphibia
- Order: Anura
- Family: Rhacophoridae
- Genus: Pseudophilautus
- Species: P. regius

Binomial name
- Pseudophilautus regius (Manamendra-Arachchi & Pethiyagoda, 2004)

Synonyms
- Philautus regius Manamendra-Arachchi & Pethiyagoda, 2004

= Pseudophilautus regius =

Species of amphibian

Pseudophilautus regius, known as Polonnaruwa shrub frog is a species of frogs in the family Rhacophoridae.

It is endemic to Sri Lanka.

Its natural habitats are subtropical or tropical dry shrubland, subtropical or tropical moist shrubland, and rural gardens. It is possibly threatened by habitat loss.

== Description ==
Pseudophilautus regius measures 18 to 22 mm for males. Its back is chocolate brown, darkening towards the rear of the body. Its flanks are brown to reddish-brown, bordered with white at the bottom. Its belly is white with dark brown pigmentation.
