= Pseudophilautus karunarathnai =

Karunarathna's shrub frog

Conservation status
- Critically Endangered (IUCN 3.1)

Scientific classification
- Kingdom: Animalia
- Phylum: Chordata
- Class: Amphibia
- Order: Anura
- Family: Rhacophoridae
- Genus: Pseudophilautus
- Species: P. karunarathnai

Binomial name
- Pseudophilautus karunarathnai Wickramasinghe et al, 2013

Species of amphibian

Pseudophilautus karunarathnai (Karunarathna's shrub frog) is a species of frogs in the family Rhacophoridae, endemic to Sri Lanka.

Its natural habitats are wet lowland forests of Sri Lanka. It is threatened by habitat loss. It is one of the 8 species of rhacophorids that was discovered from Adam's Peak recently. This frog has been observed between 700 and 1450 meters above sea level.

== Description ==
Frog is easily recognizable because of the orange-colored circle around its iris. The adult male frog measures 16.2 – 16.3 mm in snout-vent length and the adult female frog 19.2 mm. The skin of the dorsum is cream in color with darker brown marks. There is a cross-shaped mark in the intraorbital area and a smaller one on the snout. There is a transverse stripe on the back. The hind legs are cream in color. The belly is dull white in color with some marks. The webbed skin is dark brown in color.

== Habitat and threats ==
This frog has been observed in shrubs as high as 1.5 meters above the ground in rainforests and sometimes people's gardens. Scientists attribute its endangered status to habitat loss from urbanization, agriculture and grazing, and logging.

== Etymology ==
The frog was named after Mr. Y. G. P. Karunarathna, of Sri Lanka's Department of Wildlife Conservation.

== Original description ==
- Wickramasinghe LJM; Vidanapathirana DR; Rajeev MDG; Ariyarathne SC; Chanaka AWA; Priyantha LLD; Bandara IN; Wickramasinghe N. (2013). "Eight new species of Pseudophilautus (Amphibia: Anura: Rhacophoridae) from Sripada World Heritage Site (Peak Wilderness), a local amphibian hotspot in Sri Lanka". J Threatened Taxa (Abstract and figures). 5: 3789–3920. doi:10.11609/jott.864.3789-3920 (inactive 12 July 2025).
