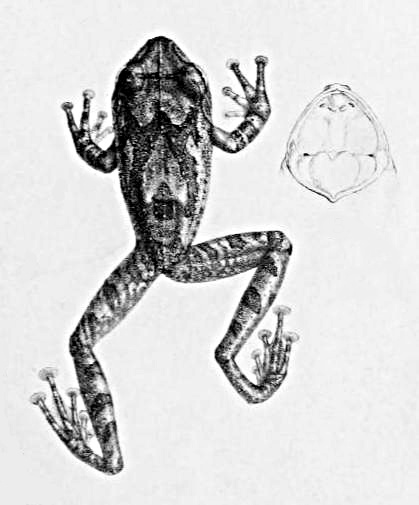

Conservation status
- Extinct (yes) (IUCN 3.1)

Scientific classification
- Kingdom: Animalia
- Phylum: Chordata
- Class: Amphibia
- Order: Anura
- Family: Rhacophoridae
- Genus: Pseudophilautus
- Species: †P. nanus

Binomial name
- †Pseudophilautus nanus (Günther, 1869)

Synonyms
- Polypedates nanus Günther, 1869; Philautus nanus (Günther, 1869); Rhacophorus nanus (Günther, 1869)

= Pseudophilautus nanus =

Extinct species of amphibian

Pseudophilautus nanus, known as southern shrub frog is an extinct species of frog in the family Rhacophoridae. It was endemic to Sri Lanka. This species is known to science only from the lectotype. There have been no records since the species was described in 1869, from material collected in southern Sri Lanka, so it is now believed to be extinct. Recent, extensive field surveys of the amphibian fauna of Sri Lanka have failed to rediscover this frog along with many other members of this genus.
