= Pseudophilautus rugatus =

Conservation status
- Extinct (IUCN 3.1)

Scientific classification
- Kingdom: Animalia
- Phylum: Chordata
- Class: Amphibia
- Order: Anura
- Family: Rhacophoridae
- Genus: Pseudophilautus
- Species: †P. rugatus

Binomial name
- †Pseudophilautus rugatus (Ahl, 1927)

Synonyms
- Rhacophorus rugatus Ahl, 1927; Philautus rugatus (Ahl, 1927)

Extinct species of amphibian

Pseudophilautus rugatus, known as Farnland shrub frog, is an extinct species of frog in the family Rhacophoridae. Habitat loss is likely to have been the major factor in the population decrease and eventual extinction of this species.

It was endemic to Sri Lanka.
