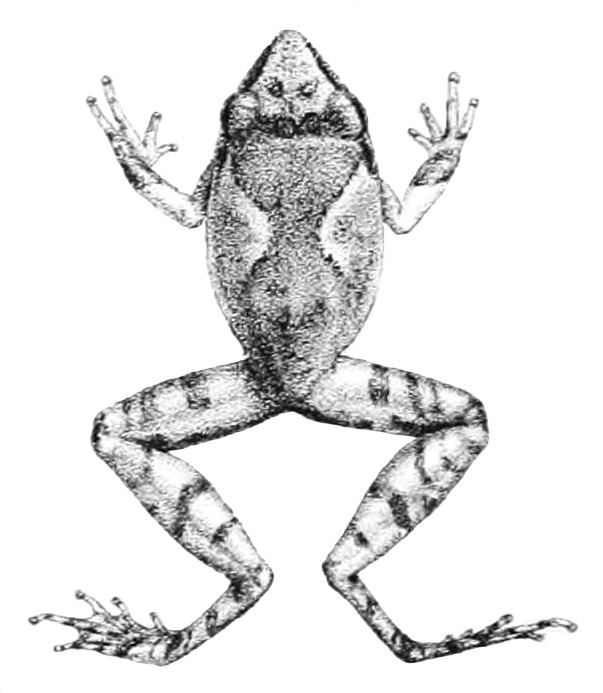

Conservation status
- Extinct (IUCN 3.1)

Scientific classification
- Kingdom: Animalia
- Phylum: Chordata
- Class: Amphibia
- Order: Anura
- Family: Rhacophoridae
- Genus: Pseudophilautus
- Species: †P. oxyrhynchus

Binomial name
- †Pseudophilautus oxyrhynchus (Günther, 1872)

Synonyms
- Ixalus oxyrhynchus Günther, 1872; Rhacophorus oxyrhynchus (Günther, 1872); Philautus oxyrhynchus (Günther, 1872)

= Pseudophilautus oxyrhynchus =

Extinct species of amphibian

Pseudophilautus oxyrhynchus, commonly known as sharp-snouted shrub frog, was a species of frog in the family Rhacophoridae. It was endemic to Sri Lanka.
