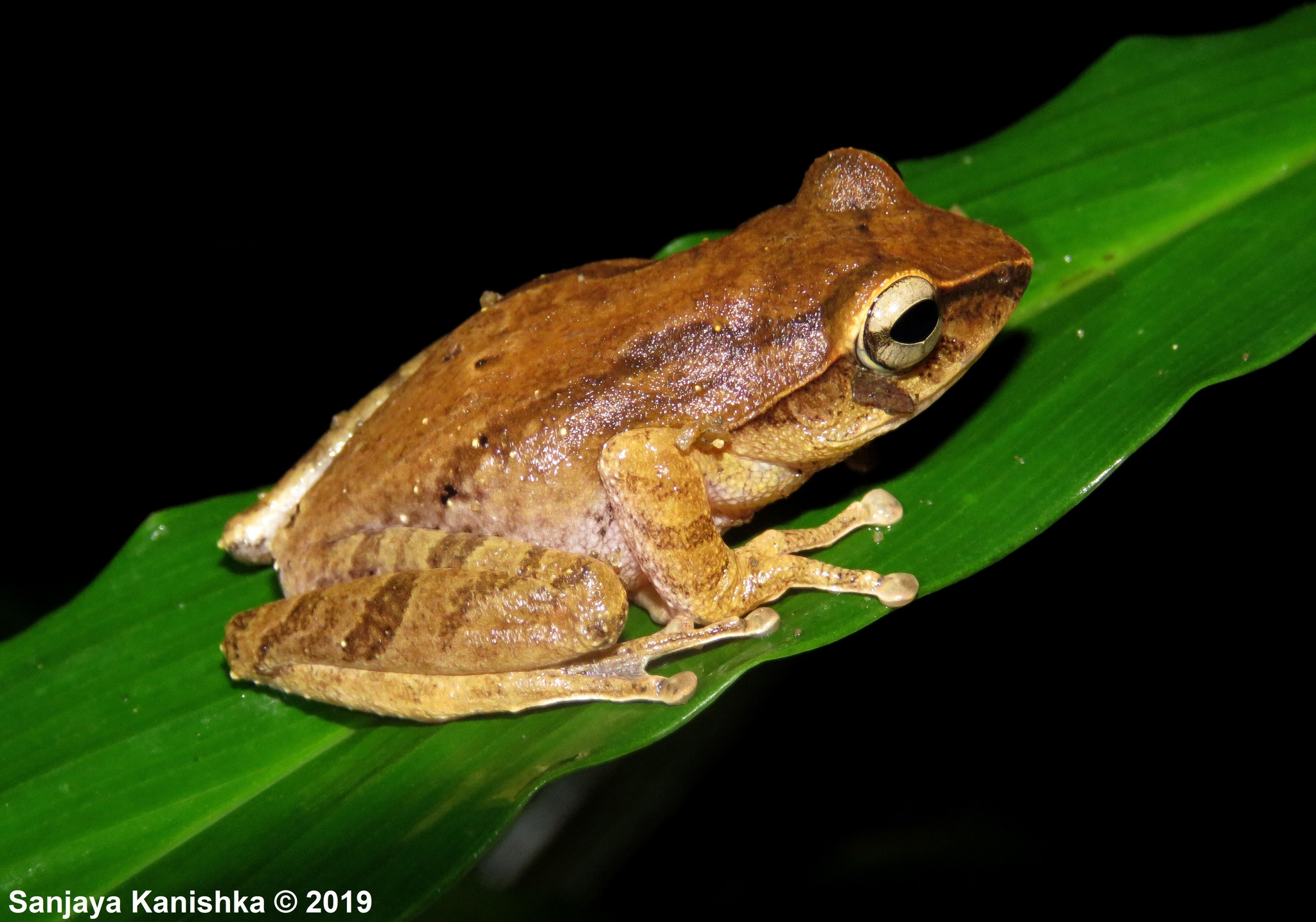
- P. papillosus in Sri Lanka

Conservation status
- Critically Endangered (IUCN 3.1)

Scientific classification
- Kingdom: Animalia
- Phylum: Chordata
- Class: Amphibia
- Order: Anura
- Family: Rhacophoridae
- Genus: Pseudophilautus
- Species: P. papillosus

Binomial name
- Pseudophilautus papillosus (Manamendra-Arachchi & Pethiyagoda, 2004)

Synonyms
- Philautus papillosus Manamendra-Arachchi & Pethiyagoda, 2004

= Pseudophilautus papillosus =

Species of amphibian

Pseudophilautus papillosus, known as papillated shrub frog is a species of frogs in the family Rhacophoridae.

It is endemic to Sri Lanka. Scientists know it exclusively from the type locality: Handapan Ell Plains, 1270 meters above sea level.

Its natural habitats are subtropical or tropical moist montane forests and heavily degraded former forest. It is threatened by habitat loss.
