= List of amphibians of Sri Lanka =

Sri Lanka is a tropical island situated close to the southern tip of India. It is situated in the middle of Indian Ocean. Because of being an island, Sri Lanka has rich endemic terrestrial and freshwater fauna, including vertebrates and several invertebrates.

== Amphibian ==
- Phylum: Chordata
- Class: Amphibia

Amphibians are ectothermic vertebrates of the class Amphibia. They have soft glandular skin and live in all habitats of the world except for the ice caps. They complete an amphibious lifestyle where larval stages live in water and adults live on or closer to land. With their complex reproductive needs and permeable skins, amphibians are often ecological indicators.

Sri Lanka is host to over 120 species of amphibians, of which over 90 species are endemic to the country. The 85% of endemicity ratio makes Sri Lanka the country which has the highest amphibian endemism in Asia. During the past decade many more new amphibians have been found in Sri Lanka.

The first amphibian review in Sri Lanka in 1957 identified 35 species. In 1996 the number of amphibian species rose to 53 based on research of museum collections and also a field survey. More than 250 species were proposed based on this field survey by Rohan Pethiyagoda and Kelum Manamendra-Arachchi in 1998. However Madhava Meegaskumbura et al. revised the number to around 140 species, and the discovery of over "new" 100 species has been criticised. As at 2019, 122 descriptions of amphibian species have been published, with 113 endemics. Three caecilian species has been identified with one undescribed species.

Sri Lanka harbours three endemic genera, Adenomus, Nannophrys, and Lankanectes. Most of the new species are of the genus Philautus which was assigned to genus Pseudophilautus recently. Hence, there are no amphibians of the genus Philautus (sensu stricto) in Sri Lanka. Pseudophilautus pardus and P. maia, the species known only from collections made prior to 1876 are described as new species in 2007, but both are extinct. In April 2015, Mendis Wickrremasinghe et al. described another endemic Pseudophilautus species P. dilmah. In January 2019, the new species, P. conniffae was discovered in southern Sri Lanka.

Sri Lanka has the highest percentage of extinct and threatened amphibian species in Asia. In the 20th century the country has lost 20% of its amphibians and more than half of the remaining species are on the verge of extinction. Of the world's 34 amphibian fauna that have gone extinct in the last 500 years, 19 are from Sri Lanka. Habitat loss is attributed as the main cause of threats while fragmentation, use of pesticides, and air pollution are among others.

== Amphibian diversity of Sri Lanka ==
Low vulnerability

Least concern
Near threatened

Threatened

Vulnerable

Endangered

Critically endangered

Extinct

Extinct in the wild
Extinct

Insufficient data

Data deficient
Not evaluated

=== Order Anura: frogs ===
Common name	Species (authority)	Endemicity	Status
Family Bufonidae: true toads
Kandyan dwarf toad	Adenomus kandianus (Günther, 1872)	Endemic	
Kelaart's dwarf toad	Adenomus kelaartii (Günther, 1858)	Endemic	
Kotagama's dwarf toad	Duttaphrynus kotagamai Fernando & Dayawansa, 1994	Endemic	
Common Indian toad	Duttaphrynus melanostictus Schneider, 1799		
Noellert's toad	Duttaphrynus noellerti Manamendra-Arachchi & Pethiyagoda, 1998	Endemic	
Ferguson's toad	Duttaphrynus scaber Schneider, 1799		
Marbled toad	Duttaphrynus stomaticus Lütken, 1862		
Family Dicroglossidae: fork-tongued frogs
Indian skipper frog	Euphlyctis cyanophlyctis (Joshy, Alam, Kurabayashi, Sumida, and Kuramoto, 2009)		
Green pond frog	Euphlyctis hexadactylus (Lesson, 1834)		
Jerdon's bullfrog	Hoplobatrachus crassus (Jerdon, 1853)		
Sri Lanka rock frog	Nannophrys ceylonensis (Günther, 1868)	Endemic	
Gunther's streamlined frog	Nannophrys guentheri Boulenger, 1882	Endemic	
Kirtisinghe's rock frog	Nannophrys marmorata Kirtisinghe, 1946	Endemic	
Nayak rock frog	Nannophrys naeyakai Fernando, Wickramasingha & Rodrigo, 2007	Endemic	
Indian burrowing frog	Sphaerotheca breviceps (Schneider, 1799)		
Sri Lanka burrowing frog	Sphaerotheca rolandae (Dubois, 1983)	Endemic	
Common Indian cricket frog	Minervarya agricola (Jerdon, 1853)		
Montane frog	Minervarya greenii (Boulenger, 1904)	Endemic	
Kirtisinghe's frog	Minervarya kirtisinghei Manamendra-Arachchi & Gabadage, 1994	Endemic	
Family Microhylidae: narrow-mouthed frogs
Karunaratne's narrow-mouthed frog	Microhyla karunaratnei Fernando & Siriwardhane, 1996	Endemic	
Mihintale red narrow-mouthed frog	Microhyla mihintalei Wijayathilaka, Garg, Senevirathne, Karunarathna, Biju & Meegaskumbura, 2016	Endemic	
Ornate narrow-mouthed frog	Microhyla ornata (Duméril & Bibron, 1841)		
Sri Lanka rice frog	Microhyla zeylanica Parker & Hill, 1949	Endemic	
Sri Lankan painted frog	Uperodon taprobanicus (Parker, 1934)		
Nagao's pug-snouted frog	Uperodon nagaoi (Manamendra-Arachchi & Pethiyagoda, 2001)	Endemic	
Sri Lanka dot frog	Uperodon obscurus (Günther, 1864)	Endemic	
Half-webbed pug-snouted frog	Uperodon palmatus (Parker, 1934)	Endemic	
Rohan's globular frog	Uperodon rohani (Garg S, Senevirathne G, Wijayathilaka N, Phuge S, Deuti K, Manamendra-Arachchi K, Meegaskumbura M, Biju SD. 2018)	Endemic	
Marbled balloon frog	Uperodon systoma (Schneider, 1799)		
Family Ranidae: true frogs
Sri Lankan golden-backed frog	Indosylvirana serendipi Biju et al., 2014	Endemic	
Gravenhorst's frog	Hydrophylax gracilis Gravenhorst, 1829	Endemic	
Bronzed frog	Indosylvirana temporalis (Günther, 1864)	Endemic	
Family Nyctibatrachidae: robust frogs
Corrugated water frog	Lankanectes corrugatus (Peters, 1863)	Endemic	
	Lankanectes pera Senevirathne et al., 2018	Endemic	
Family Rhacophoridae: shrub frogs
	Pseudophilautus abundus Manamendra-Arachchi & Pethiyagoda, 2005	Endemic	
	Pseudophilautus adspersus (Günther, 1872)	Endemic	
	Pseudophilautus alto Manamendra-Arachchi & Pethiyagoda, 2005	Endemic	
	Pseudophilautus asankai Manamendra-Arachchi & Pethiyagoda, 2005	Endemic	
	Pseudophilautus auratus Manamendra-Arachchi & Pethiyagoda, 2005	Endemic	
	Pseudophilautus bambaradeniyai Wickramasinghe et al., 2013	Endemic	
	Pseudophilautus caeruleus Manamendra-Arachchi & Pethiyagoda, 2005	Endemic	
	Pseudophilautus cavirostris (Günther, 1869)	Endemic	
	Pseudophilautus conniffae Batuwita, De Silva & Udugampala, 2019	Endemic	
	Pseudophilautus cuspis Manamendra-Arachchi & Pethiyagoda, 2005	Endemic	
	Pseudophilautus dayawansai Wickramasinghe et al. 2013	Endemic	
	Pseudophilautus decoris Manamendra-Arachchi & Pethiyagoda, 2005	Endemic	
	Pseudophilautus dilmah (Wickramasinghe, Bandara, Vidanapathirana, Tennakoon, Samarakoon & Wickramasinghe, 2015)	Endemic	
	Pseudophilautus dimbullae (Shreve, 1940)	Endemic	
	Pseudophilautus eximius (Shreve, 1940)	Endemic	
	Pseudophilautus extirpo Manamendra-Arachchi & Pethiyagoda, 2005	Endemic	
	Pseudophilautus femoralis (Günther, 1864)	Endemic	
	Pseudophilautus fergusonianus (Ahl, 1927)	Endemic	
	Pseudophilautus folicola Manamendra-Arachchi & Pethiyagoda, 2005	Endemic	
	Pseudophilautus frankenbergi Meegaskumbura & Manamendra-Arachchi, 2005	Endemic	
	Pseudophilautus fulvus Manamendra-Arachchi & Pethiyagoda, 2005	Endemic	
	Pseudophilautus hallidayi Meegaskumbura & Manamendra-Arachchi, 2005	Endemic	
	Pseudophilautus halyi (Boulenger, 1904)	Endemic	
	Pseudophilautus hankeni Meegaskumbura & Manamendra-Archchi, 2011	Endemic	
	Pseudophilautus hoipolloi Manamendra-Arachchi & Pethiyagoda, 2005	Endemic	
	Pseudophilautus hypomelas (Günther, 1876)	Endemic	
	Pseudophilautus jagathgunawardanai Wickramasinghe et al. 2013	Endemic	
	Pseudophilautus karunarathnai Wickramasinghe et al. 2013	Endemic	
	Pseudophilautus leucorhinus (Lichtenstein, Weinland & Von Martens, 1856)	Endemic	
	Pseudophilautus limbus Manamendra-Arachchi & Pethiyagoda, 2005	Endemic	
	Pseudophilautus lunatus Manamendra-Arachchi & Pethiyagoda, 2005	Endemic	
	Pseudophilautus macropus (Günther, 1869)	Endemic	
	Pseudophilautus maia (Meegaskumbara et al., 2007)	Endemic	
	Pseudophilautus malcolmsmithi (Ahl, 1927)	Endemic	
	Pseudophilautus microtympanum (Günther, 1859)	Endemic	
	Pseudophilautus mittermeieri Meegaskumbura & Manamendra-Arachchi, 2005	Endemic	
	Pseudophilautus mooreorum Meegaskumbura & Manamendra-Arachchi, 2005	Endemic	
	Pseudophilautus nanus (Günther, 1869)	Endemic	
	Pseudophilautus nasutus (Günther, 1869)	Endemic	
	Pseudophilautus nemus Manamendra-Arachchi & Pethiyagoda, 2005	Endemic	
	Pseudophilautus newtonjayawardanei Wickramasinghe et al. 2013	Endemic	
	Pseudophilautus ocularis Manamendra-Arachchi & Pethiyagoda, 2005	Endemic	
	Pseudophilautus oxyrhynchus (Günther, 1872)	Endemic	
	Pseudophilautus papillosus Manamendra-Arachchi & Pethiyagoda, 2005	Endemic	
	Pseudophilautus pardus (Meegaskumbura, Manamendra-Arachchi, Schneider and Pethiyagoda, 2007)	Endemic	
	Pseudophilautus pleurotaenia (Boulenger, 1904)	Endemic	
	Pseudophilautus poppiae Meegaskumbura & Manamendra-Arachchi, 2005	Endemic	
	Pseudophilautus popularis Manamendra-Arachchi & Pethiyagoda, 2005	Endemic	
	Pseudophilautus procax Manamendra-Arachchi & Pethiyagoda, 2005	Endemic	
	Pseudophilautus puranappu Wickramasinghe et al. 2013	Endemic	
	Pseudophilautus regius Manamendra-Arachchi & Pethiyagoda, 2005	Endemic	
	Pseudophilautus reticulatus (Günther, 1864)	Endemic	
	Pseudophilautus rugatus (Ahl, 1927)	Endemic	
	Pseudophilautus rus Manamendra-Arachchi & Pethiyagoda, 2005	Endemic	
	Pseudophilautus samarakoon Wickramasinghe et al. 2013	Endemic	
	Pseudophilautus sarasinorum (Müller, 1887)	Endemic	
	Pseudophilautus schmarda (Kelaart, 1854)	Endemic	
	Pseudophilautus schneideri Meegaskumbura & Manamendra-Arachchi, 2011	Endemic	
	Pseudophilautus semiruber (Annandale, 1913)	Endemic	
	Pseudophilautus silus Manamendra-Arachchi & Pethiyagoda, 2005	Endemic	
	Pseudophilautus silvaticus Manamendra-Arachchi & Pethiyagoda, 2005	Endemic	
	Pseudophilautus simba Manamendra-Arachchi & Pethiyagoda, 2005	Endemic	
	Pseudophilautus singu Meegaskumbura & Manamendra-Arachchi, & Pethiyagoda 2009	Endemic	
	Pseudophilautus sirilwijesundarai Wickramasinghe et al. 2013	Endemic	
	Pseudophilautus sordidus Manamendra-Arachchi & Pethiyagoda, 2005	Endemic	
	Pseudophilautus stellatus (Kelaart, 1853)	Endemic	
	Pseudophilautus steineri Meegaskumbura & Manamendra-Arachchi, 2005	Endemic	
	Pseudophilautus stictomerus (Günther, 1876)	Endemic	
	Pseudophilautus stuarti Meegaskumbura & Manamendra-Arachchi, 2005	Endemic	
	Pseudophilautus tanu Meegaskumbura & Manamendra-Arachchi, & Pethiyagoda 2009	Endemic	
	Pseudophilautus temporalis (Günther, 1864)	Endemic	
	Pseudophilautus variabilis (Günther, 1859)	Endemic	
	Pseudophilautus viridis Manamendra-Arachchi & Pethiyagoda, 2005	Endemic	
	Pseudophilautus zal Manamendra-Arachchi & Pethiyagoda, 2005	Endemic	
	Pseudophilautus zimmeri (Ahl, 1927)	Endemic	
	Pseudophilautus zorro Manamendra-Arachchi & Pethiyagoda, 2005	Endemic	
Common hour-glass tree frog	Polypedates cruciger Blyth, 1852	Endemic	
Indian tree frog	Polypedates maculatus (Gray, 1834)		
Ranwella's spined tree frog	Polypedates ranwellai Wickramasinghe, Munindrasasa & Fernando, 2012	Endemic	
Montane hour-glass tree frog	Taruga eques Günther, 1858	Endemic	
Morningside hour-glass tree frog	Taruga fastigo Manamendra-Arachchi & Pethiyagoda, 2001	Endemic	
Long-snouted tree frog	Taruga longinasus (Ahl, 1931)	Endemic	

=== Order Gymnophiona: caecilians ===
Common name	Species (authority)	Endemicity	Status
Family Ichthyophiidae: Asiatic tailed caecilians
Ceylon caecilian	Ichthyophis glutinosus (Linnaeus, 1758)	Endemic	
Pattipola caecilian	Ichthyophis orthoplicatus Taylor, 1965	Endemic	
Lesser yellow-banded caecilian	Ichthyophis pseudangularis Taylor, 1965	Endemic	
