= Pseudophilautus pardus =

Conservation status
- Extinct (IUCN 3.1)

Scientific classification
- Kingdom: Animalia
- Phylum: Chordata
- Class: Amphibia
- Order: Anura
- Family: Rhacophoridae
- Genus: Pseudophilautus
- Species: †P. pardus

Binomial name
- †Pseudophilautus pardus (Meegaskumbura, Manamendra-Arachchi, Schneider and Pethiyagoda, 2007)

Synonyms
- Philautus pardus Meegaskumbura, Manamendra-Arachchi, Schneider and Pethiyagoda, 2007

Extinct species of amphibian

Pseudophilautus pardus is an extinct species of Sri Lankan shrub frogs in the family Rhacophoridae. Despite extensive surveys in recent years, the species is known only from a collection made prior to 1858. The reason for its extinction is unknown but probably relates loss of forests.

== Etymology ==
The specific name pardus is the Latinized form of pardos, the Greek word for leopard, in allusion to the leopard-like colouration of this species.

== Description ==
This species was described based on a single specimen (holotype), an adult female that was a paralectotype of Ixalus variabilis Günther, 1858. No other specimens are known. Prior to its naming in 2007, the specimen had also been confused with Pseudophilautus viridis and Pseudophilautus stuarti.

The holotype measures 32 mm (1.3 in) in snout–vent length. The body is stout. The tympanum is oval in shape. The toes are webbed. The dorsum is yellowish brown in preservative and has many dark-brown spots, some of them joining to form larger blotches. The underside is uniform in colour.

== Habitat and distribution ==
The type locality is unspecific "Ceylon". Its habitat is likely to have been forest.
