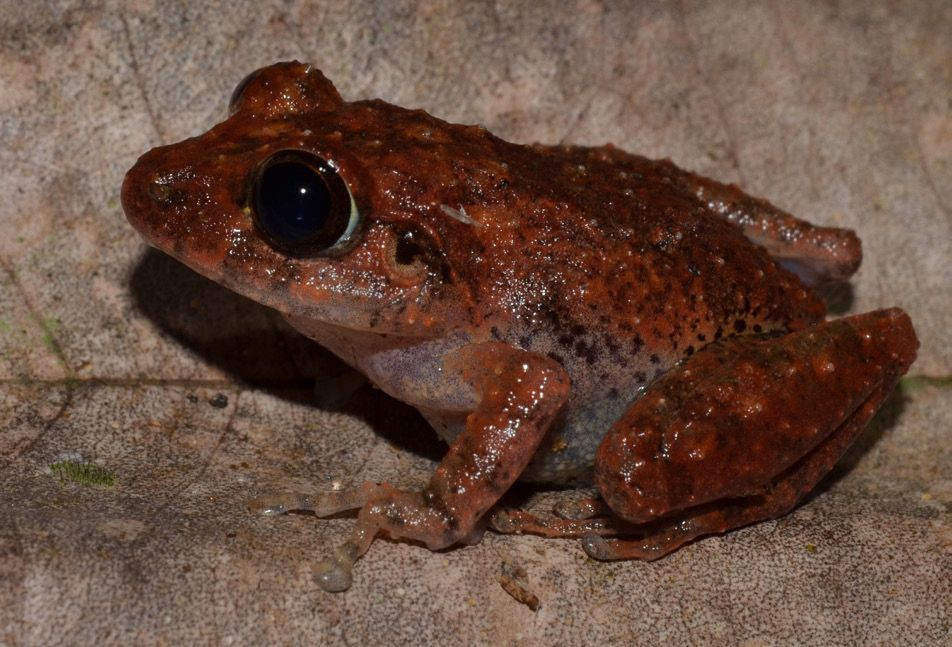
- Female paratype from Dediyagala Forest Reserve

Conservation status
- Endangered (IUCN 3.1)

Scientific classification
- Kingdom: Animalia
- Phylum: Chordata
- Class: Amphibia
- Order: Anura
- Family: Rhacophoridae
- Genus: Pseudophilautus
- Species: P. conniffae

Binomial name
- Pseudophilautus conniffae Batuwita, M. de Silva & Udugampala, 2019

= Pseudophilautus conniffae =

Species of amphibian

Pseudophilautus conniffae, commonly known as Conniff's shrub frog, is a species of frogs in the family Rhacophoridae. It is endemic to Sri Lanka.

== Etymology ==
The specific name conniffae is due to Karen Lynn Conniff, for her assistance to researchers during field visits and for her efforts on the Odonata of Sri Lanka.

== Description ==
The species was once confused with Pseudophilautus rus. However new studies revealed that P. conniffae is different from its relative in many ways. It has a conical median lingual process which is absent in P. rus. Black patches are found on the posterior flank, anterior and posterior edges of the thigh. Fourth toe is webbed all over to penultimate subarticular tubercle on inner and outer sides.

The sympatric species, Pseudophilautus limbus shared many similarities with the new species. However, new species can be identified separately from these characters. Supernumerary tubercles on manus is present. Frontoparietal ridges are absent.

Adult male is 23.5 mm (0.93 in) long in size. Dorsum is covered with prominent warts. Supratympanic fold is clearly visible. Nuptial pads absent. Between forelimbs, there is a large, dark brown square-shaped blotch on mid-dorsum. black and white patches are found on anterior and posterior surfaces of thigh and posterior flank. Dorsum light brown with dark brown patches.

== Habitat ==
The species is confined to the southwestern wet zone of Sri Lanka.
