= Peak Wilderness Sanctuary =

Nature reserve in Sri Lanka

"Sri Pada" Peak Wilderness Sanctuary
- IUCN category Ia (strict nature reserve)
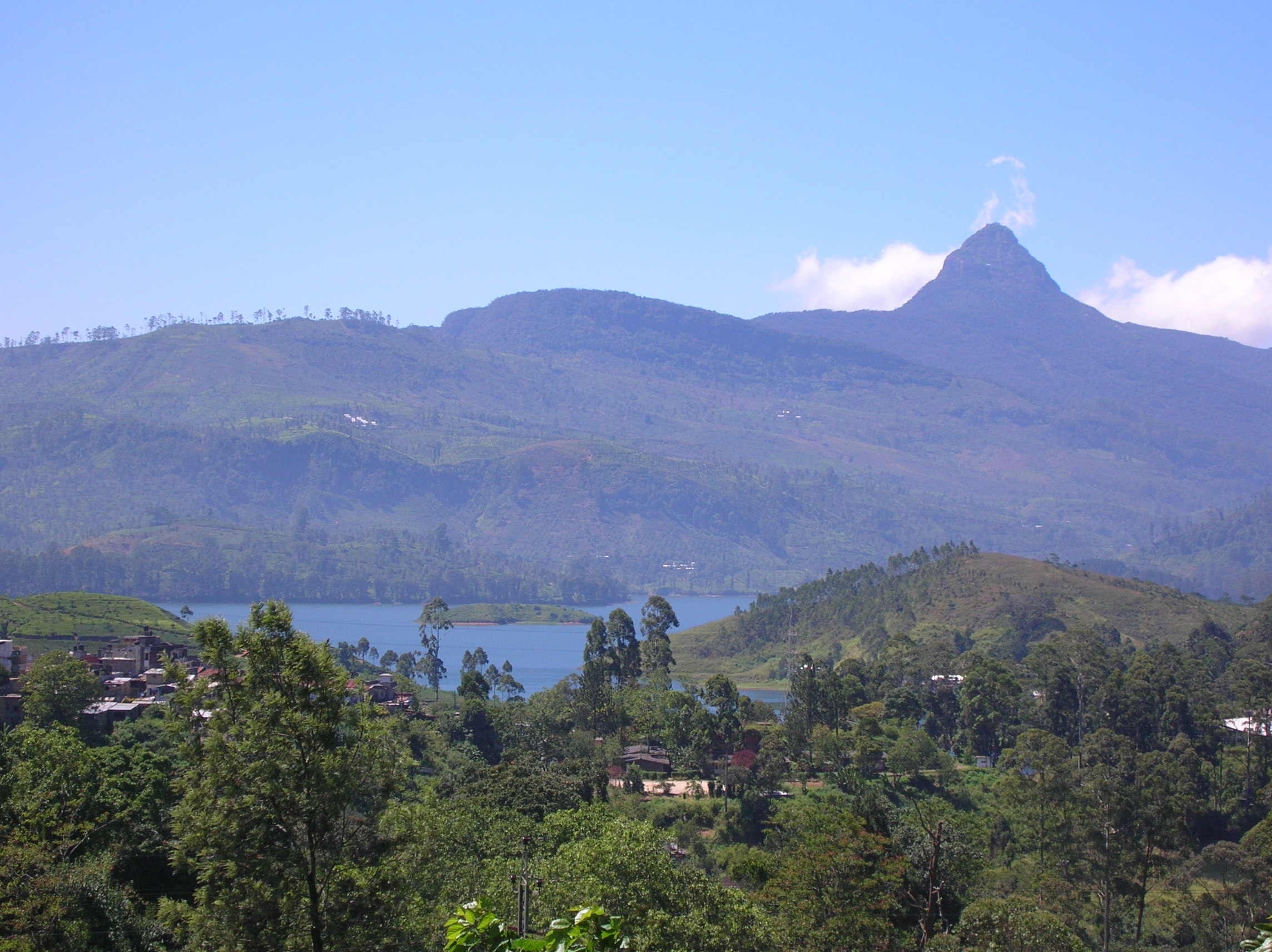
- "Sri Pada" Peak Wilderness encompasses the Adam's Peak (Sri Pada)

- Location within Sri Lanka
- Location: Central and Sabaragamuwa provinces, Sri Lanka
- Nearest city: Ratnapura
- Coordinates: 6°48′47″N 80°29′04″E
- Area: 22,379.1 ha (86.406 sq mi)
- Established: 25 October 1940
- Governing body: Department of Wildlife Conservation
- World Heritage site: 1203-001: "Peak Wilderness Protected Area (PWPA)" since 2010 (within the site Central Highlands of Sri Lanka)

Peak Wilderness Sanctuary is a natural reserve in Sri Lanka. It is the third largest (by area) of the 50 sanctuaries in the country.

"Sri Pada" Peak Wilderness Sanctuary is a tropical rainforest spread over 224 km^{2} (86 sq mi) around the Sri Pada (Adam's Peak) mountain. A huge forest area that belonged to the Peak Wilderness was cut down and cleared during the British colonial rule in Sri Lanka (1815–1948) to gain land for the massive tea estates which are still functioning in Nuwara Eliya district. The remaining portion of the Peak Wilderness was declared a wildlife sanctuary on October 25, 1940.

Out of the three access routes; Hatton route, Kuruwita route and Palabaddala route, which Buddhist devotees and other tourists use to reach the Adam’s Peak, Kuruwita and Palabaddala routes go right across the Peak Wilderness sanctuary. This forest area is entirely under the control of Sri Lanka Wildlife Conservation Department. It does not maintain any lodge, bungalow or such type of facility for tourists inside Peak Wilderness sanctuary in order to safeguard the purity of this forest. Yet, there is no restriction for eco-tourists to enter the sanctuary after obtaining permission from Sri Lanka Wildlife Conservation Department. Entering the sanctuary during the rain season is at the tourist’s own risk because of the unforeseen downpours and instant floods lead to life-risk situations.

== Physical features ==
The contours of "Sri Pada" Peak Wilderness vary from 300 to 2,240 m (1,000 to 7,360 ft) above sea level.Therefore, it possesses unusual geographical formations compared to the other natural reserves of the island.Therefore all three tropical rainforest types, tropical lowland rainforests(below 900m above sea level), tropical submontane rarainforests(900m - 1200m above sea level) and tropical montane rainforests(above 1200m from sea level) are occur in this sanctuary. Bena Samanala (2,005 m (6,579 ft)), Dotalugala, Detanagala, are some of the taller mountains in the Peak Wilderness. It is also the birthplace of Kelani, Kalu, Walave rivers and many tributaries of the river Mahaweli which make waterfalls such as Dotalu falls, Geradi falls, Galagama falls (200 m (655 ft)), and Mapanana falls (100 m (330 ft)) inside the sanctuary.

== Location ==
It is located within the Sabaragamuwa mountain range in the central hills.

== Boundaries ==
There are no specific boundaries for the Peak Wilderness sanctuary. Most boundaries are marked by plantations owned by the Government and the private sector. The eastern boundary is clear and connected to Pidurutalagala mountain region and Horton Plains National Park.

== Fauna ==
In October 2009, the world's rarest toad Adenomus kandianus was rediscovered in this sanctuary after it was thought to be extinct for 133 years.

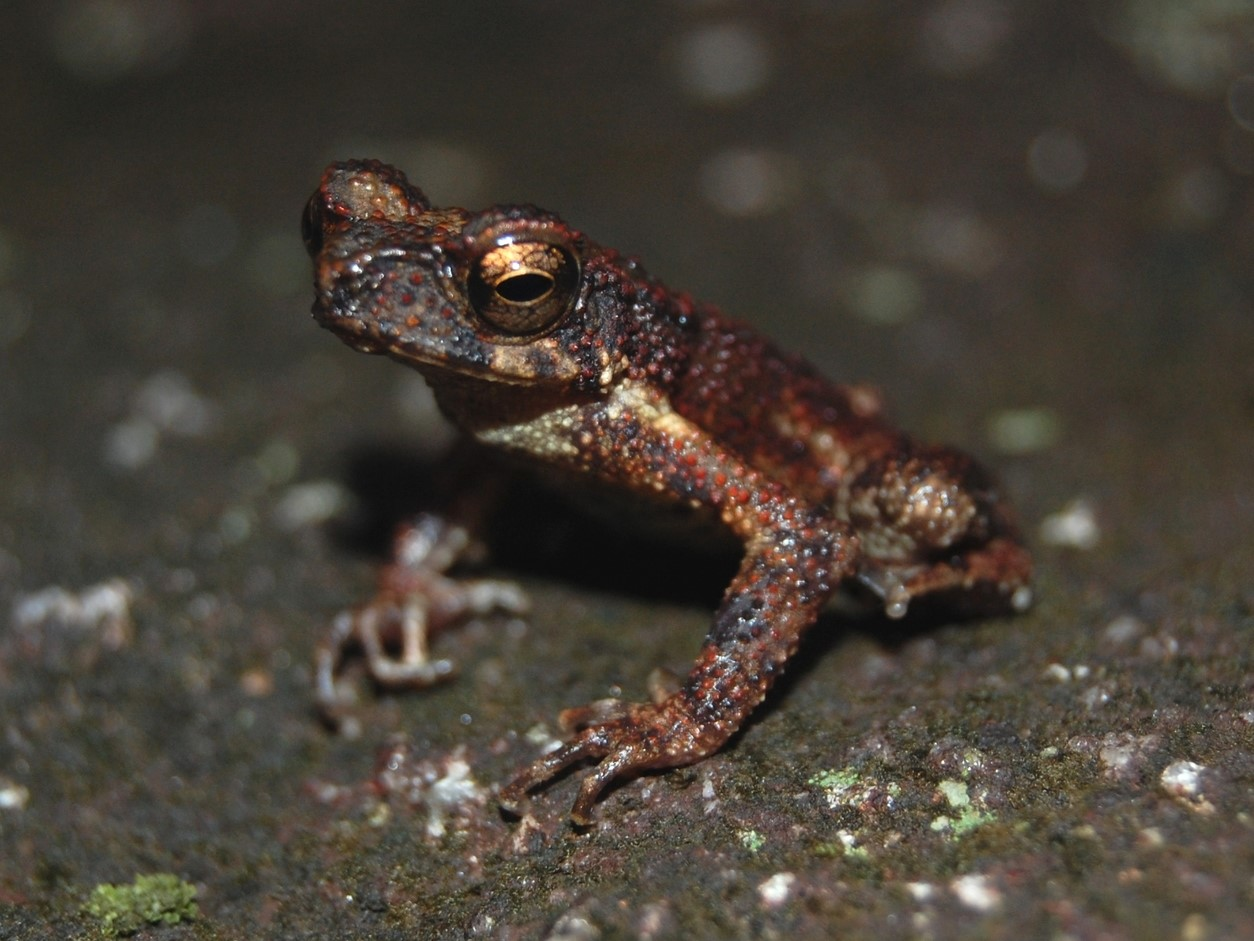
Adenomus kandianus in Peak Wilderness Sanctuary

In 2009, another rare endemic shrub frog species Pseudophilautus stellatus was rediscovered in this sanctuary after it was thought to be extinct for 156 years.

Pseudophilautus stellatus in Peak Wilderness Sanctuary

In 2010, another rare endemic shrub frog species Pseudophilautus hypomelas was rediscovered in this sanctuary after it was thought to be extinct for 130 years.

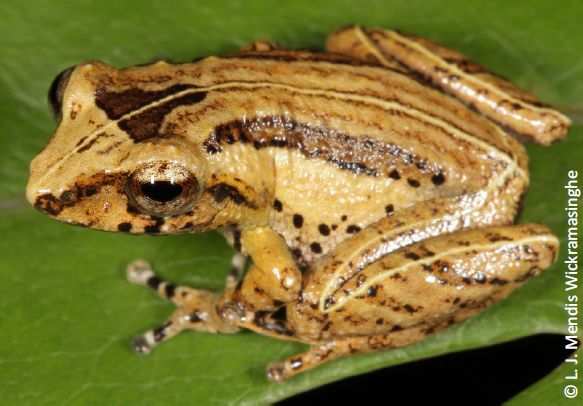
Pseudophilautus hypomelas in Peak Wilderness Sanctuary

In 2013, 8 new shrub frog species in the Pseudophilautus genus are recorded from this sanctuary.They are as follow.

• Pseudophilautus bambaradeniyai

• Pseudophilautus dayawansai

• Pseudophilautus jagathgunawardanai

• Pseudophilautus karunarathnai

• Pseudophilautus newtonjayawardanei

• Pseudophilautus puranappu

• Pseudophilautus samarakoon

• Pseudophilautus sirilwijesundarai

Aspidura ravanai, an endemic reptile species is only found from Peak Wilderness Sanctuary.

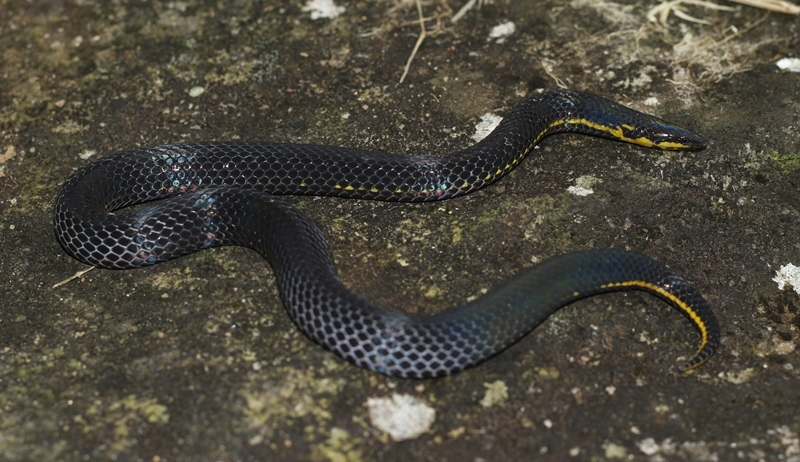
Aspidura ravanai in Peak Wilderness Sanctuary

This sanctuary is also significant as the sanctuary that supports the last remnant wet zone and montane region elephant population in the country following its separation from the lowland forests. This separation caused by deforestation has isolated an estimated number of 30 – 50 elephants, a population size that allows the viability of the species, in the mountainous high elevations of the peak wilderness forests. This herd of elephants is known as 'The Ghost Herd'. On the first sighting in the 2000s, Wildlife Officer Anil Vithanage found these elephants at the Dharmaraja Gala area of the Peak Wilderness Sanctuary.

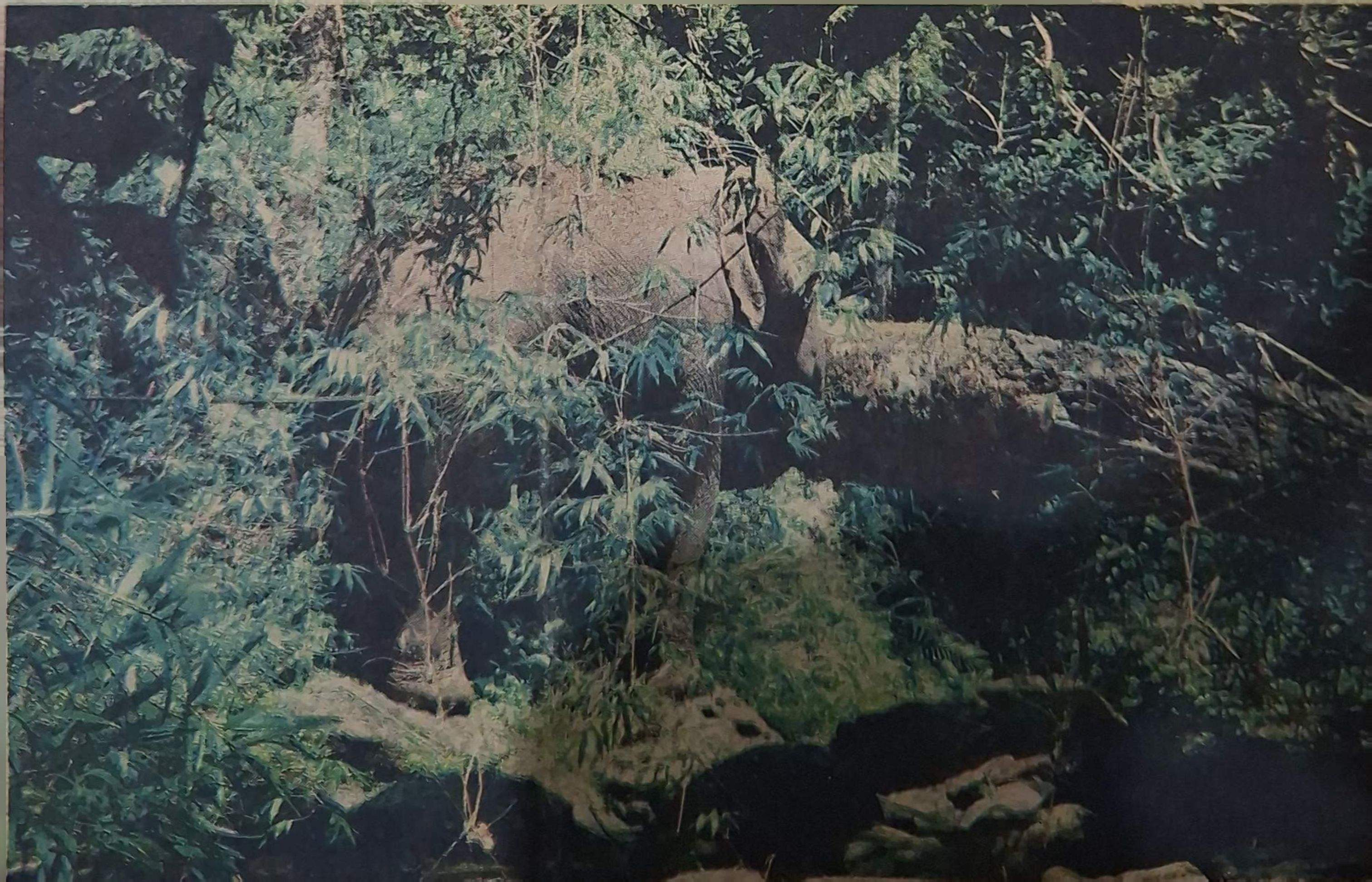
Elephants in the Peak Wilderness Sanctuary

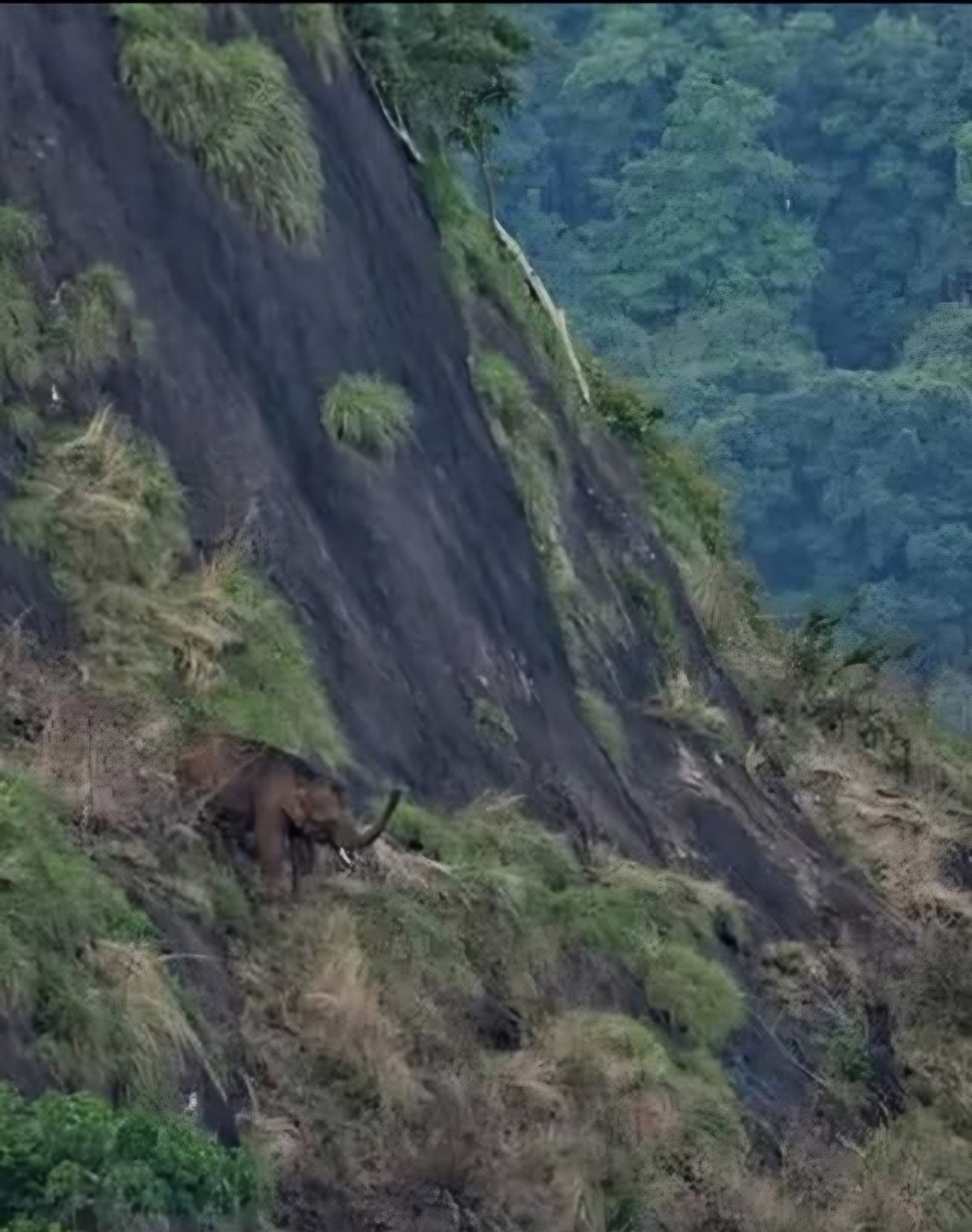
Elephants at the Seven Virgins mountain range in the Peak Wilderness Sanctuary

== Gallery ==

Endemic Vesak orchid in Peak Wilderness Sanctuary

Endemic Ipsea speciosa at a wet patana grassland in Peak Wilderness Sanctuary

Endemic Podochilus warnagalensis only found in Peak Wilderness Sanctuary

Endemic Anoectochilus regalis in Peak Wilderness Sanctuary

Endemic Oberonia meegaskumburae only found in Peak Wilderness Sanctuary

== See also ==
- Protected areas of Sri Lanka
