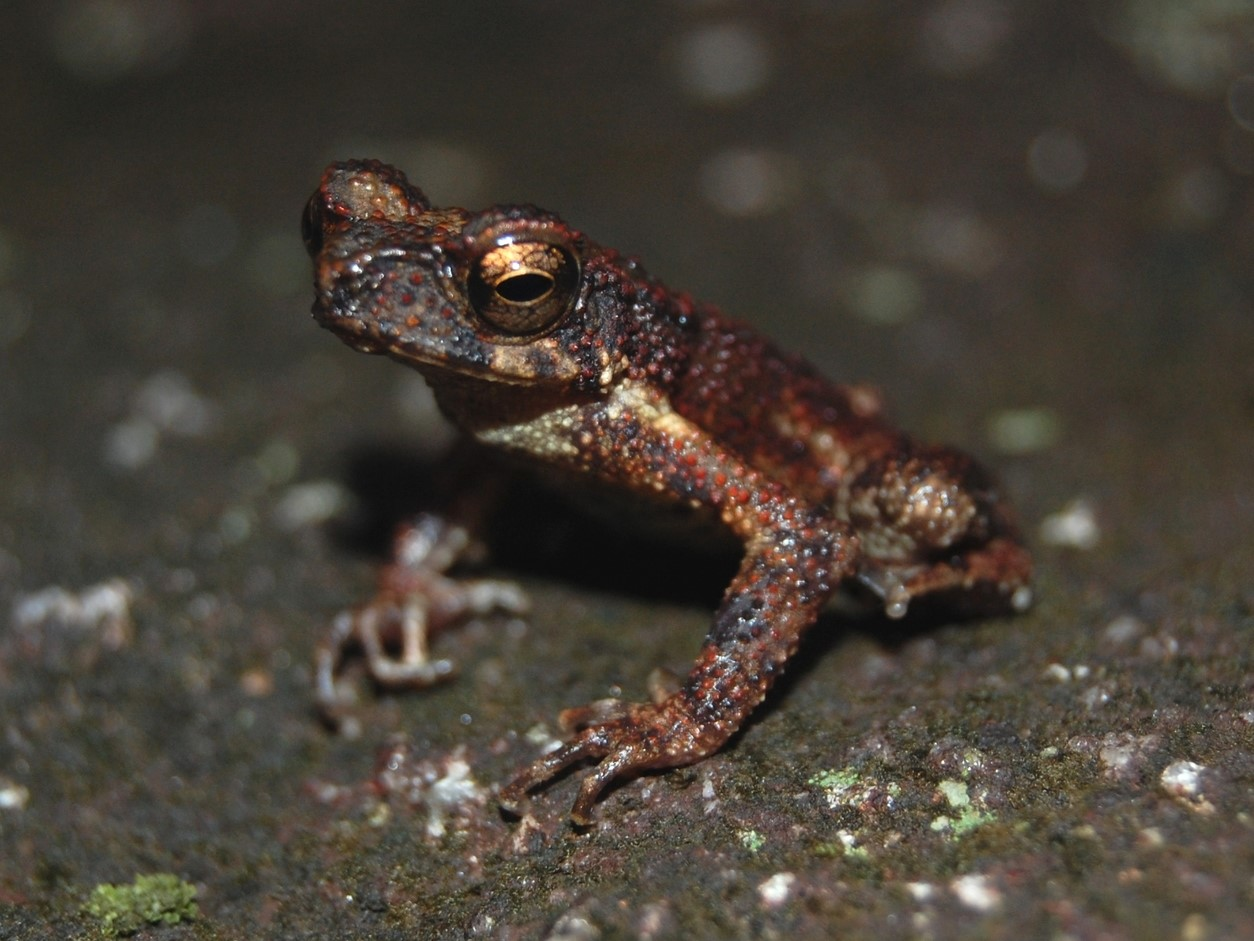

Conservation status
- Endangered (IUCN 3.1)

Scientific classification
- Kingdom: Animalia
- Phylum: Chordata
- Class: Amphibia
- Order: Anura
- Family: Bufonidae
- Genus: Adenomus
- Species: A. kandianus

Binomial name
- Adenomus kandianus (Günther, 1872)

Synonyms
- Bufo kandianus Günther, 1872; Adenomus dasi Manamendra-Arachchi and Pethiyagoda, 1998

= Adenomus kandianus =

Species of amphibian

Adenomus kandianus (Kandyan dwarf toad) is a species of toad in the family Bufonidae endemic to Sri Lanka. It is a high-altitude species known only from few localities. The specific name kandianus means "from Kandy" and seems to suggest that the type material came from near the city of Kandy.

== Rediscovery ==
As there had been no record of the species since 1872, it was listed as extinct by the IUCN in 2004. However, in June 2012 it was announced that almost three years earlier, in October 2009, the species was rediscovered in the Peak Wilderness Sanctuary in Sri Lanka. In light of the discovery, the species was reclassified in 2012 as critically endangered in the IUCN Red List of Threatened Species. Another extant population was reported in 2014 from Pidurutalagala Forest Reserve.

== Description ==
Adult males measure 30–35 mm (1.2–1.4 in) and adult females 40–45 mm (1.6–1.8 in) in snout–vent length. The parotoid glands are relatively long, which is the single morphological trait that separates Adenomus kandianus from Adenomus kelaartii with shorter parotoid glands. The tympanum is submerged and poorly visible. The toes are partially to fully webbed; the partially webbed morphs were described as a separate species, Adenomus dasi, but because the morphs show negligible genetic differences, A. dasi is not longer recognized as distinct. The fingers have no webbing.

The dorsum is yellowish brown; the head is more reddish compared to the body. A tiny gold-coloured vertebral stripe is present. The parotoid glands are chocolate or dark brown. The lips have black and gold dots. The venter is gold. An hourglass-shaped pattern of tubercles on the dorsum may be present.

The tadpole has relatively long body (39% of total length). The body is flattened and wide anteriorly, accommodating a ventral sucker disc that covers more than half of the body. The eyes are bulbous. Gosner stage 36 specimen measures 27 mm (1.1 in) in total length.

== Habitat ==
Adenomus kandianus is known from montane cloud forests and tropical moist forests in and near hill streams at elevations of 1,100–1,879 m (3,609–6,165 ft) above sea level. The tadpoles develop in the streams.
