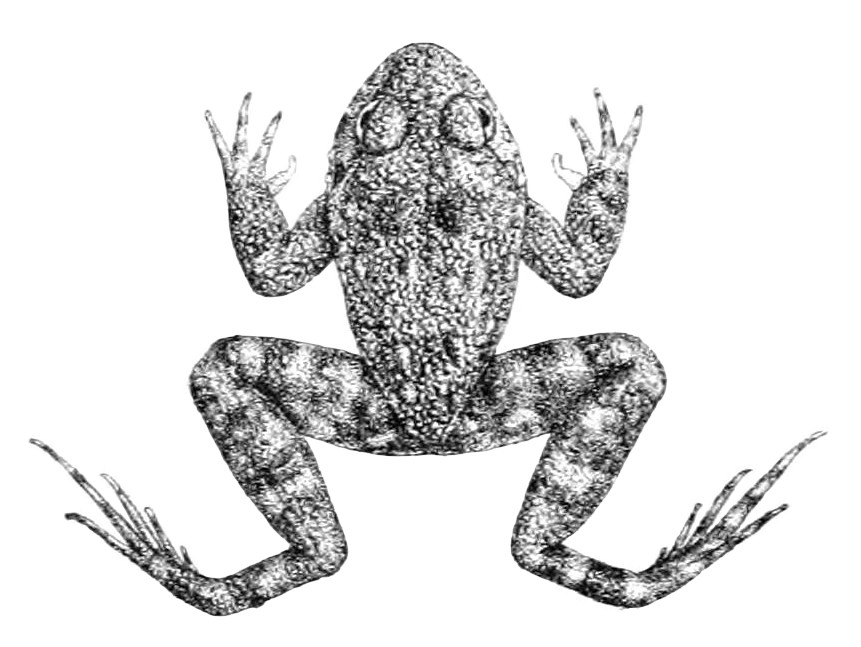

Conservation status
- Extinct (IUCN 3.1)

Scientific classification
- Kingdom: Animalia
- Phylum: Chordata
- Class: Amphibia
- Order: Anura
- Family: Dicroglossidae
- Genus: Nannophrys
- Species: †N. guentheri

Binomial name
- †Nannophrys guentheri Boulenger, 1882

= Nannophrys guentheri =

Extinct species of amphibian

Nannophrys guentheri (Gunther's streamlined frog) is an extinct species of frog in the family Dicroglossidae. It was endemic to Sri Lanka. The species was first identified in 1882 by George Boulenger and named after the German-born British zoologist Albert Günther. It is not known where in Sri Lanka the specimens were found.

== Taxonomy ==
Nannophrys guentheri has not been observed since the type specimens were collected. These are poorly preserved and might not be distinct from Nannophrys ceylonensis. Genus Nannophrys used to be placed in the large frog family Ranidae but a phylogenetic study was undertaken using DNA sequences and it is now included in the family Dicroglossidae.

== Description ==
Nannophrys guentheri was a small species, with snout to vent length given as 28.5 mm for males.

Vomerine teeth are in two indistinct groups behind the choanae (the inner part of the nostrils). Lower jaw has slight traces of bony prominences in front. Head is rather small and not bony. Snout is short, rounded, with angular canthus rostralis. Interorbital space is narrower than the upper eyelid and tympanum is not distinctly defined.

First finger is shorter than second and the difference of length between the first and second fingers is much greater than that between the second and third. The tips of fingers are pointed, while the toes have a short, but very distinct web at the base. Subarticular tubercles of fingers and toes are not well developed: inner metatarsal tubercle is elongate and rather indistinct while there is no outer tubercle. The hind limb being carried forwards along the body the tibiotarsal articulation reaches the tip of the snout. Skin is strongly tubercular above and smooth beneath. A fold of the skin unites the posterior edges of the upper eyelids, and extends from the eye, over the tympanum and to the shoulder. Upper parts are brown and marbled with darker colour. The upper lip and the sides of body and limbs have small light spots; the hind limbs are cross-barred. The underside of the frog is uniform whitish. Males have two internal vocal sacs.

The longer hind limbs and the smaller head give this species a much more slender appearance than the related Nannophrys ceylonensis: the proportions of the fingers are also important differences between the two species.
