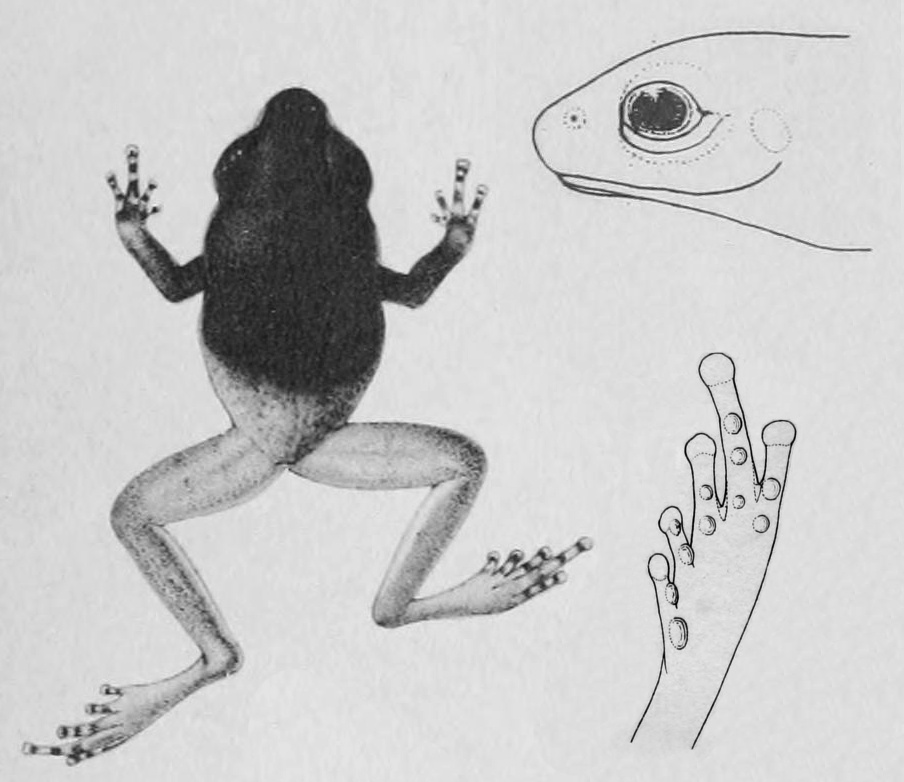

Conservation status
- Endangered (IUCN 3.1)

Scientific classification
- Kingdom: Animalia
- Phylum: Chordata
- Class: Amphibia
- Order: Anura
- Family: Rhacophoridae
- Genus: Pseudophilautus
- Species: P. semiruber

Binomial name
- Pseudophilautus semiruber (Annandale, 1913)

Synonyms
- Ixalus semiruber Annandale, 1913

= Pseudophilautus semiruber =

Tiny-red shrub-frog

Species of frog

Pseudophilautus semiruber, known as Annandale's shrub frog, is a species of frog in the family Rhacophoridae that is endemic to Sri Lanka.

Pseudophilautus semiruber is one of the smallest frog species in Sri Lanka and it is also one of the world's smallest frogs, measuring less than 15 mm in snout-to-vent length (diminutive species). A single specimen of this species was first discovered in 1911 and described by Annandale in 1913, referring to it as Ixalus semiruber. For the next 95 years since 1913, this species was not again seen alive, and the type specimen on which the original description was made, was confirmed to be lost from a Museum collection by 2001.

Extensive field research conducted by Madhava Meegaskumbura in 2005, targeting molecular characterization of the Sri Lankan shrub frog species, lead to the re-discovery of this species from near a small forest reserve (Agra-Bopath) close to the Horton Plains National Park, Sri Lanka.

== Description ==
Snout to vent length 12–13.4 mm. Body stout in shape. Head is laterally convex. In lateral and dorsal view snout oval shaped. Canthal edges rounded. Loreal region flat. Interorbital space concave. Internarial space flat. Nostrils oval. Pupil oval, horizontal. Tympanum distinct, oval, vertical, its outer rim narrow but clear. Pineal ocellus absent. Vomerine ridge absent. Tongue moderate, elongate, emarginate; no lingual papilla. Supratympanic fold feebly defined. Cephalic ridges absent. Skin on head not co-ossified. Upper arm short, lower arm slender. Dorsal and lateral parts of head and body, and lower part of flank, smooth. Dorso-lateral fold absent. Dorsal and lateral parts of upper arm, lower arm, thigh, shank and foot smooth. A narrow dermal ridge on mid-dorsum to back of head, then to vent. Throat, chest, belly and underside of thigh smooth.

Pseudophilautus semiruber is distinguished from P. simba, the sibling species of P. semiruber, by having the supratympanic fold indistinct (vs. distinct in P. simba); webbing present (vs. rudimentary) between all toes; throat, chest and belly smooth (vs. granular); white patches distinct, evenly distributed on throat, chest, anterior and mid-belly, fewer on posterior belly (vs. diffused white patches only on chest and anterior half of belly, absent on throat and lower belly); throat ashy brown, chest and belly reddish brown (vs. throat, chest and anterior belly black); entire upper arm and proximal half of lower arm dorsally red (vs. entire lower arm and fingers dorsally light brown in P. simba); thigh and inner shank dorsally red (vs. light brown in P. simba); and thigh and shank ventrally 'light red' with white patches (vs. light brown to dark brown, with white patches only in region of knee).

== Distribution and ecology ==
Pseudophilautus semiruber was originally described from a single specimen collected at Pattipola, Sri Lanka (06º51'21"N, 80º49'40"E; 1,850 m a.s.l.). The species is probably restricted to the jungle forests of this area and is probably under-represented in collections because its small size may have led to it being overlooked as the juvenile of a larger Pseudophilautus species.

This species is strictly a day-active litter dwelling species, that is similar in habit to its sister species.
