= Pseudophilautus zimmeri =

Conservation status
- Extinct (IUCN 3.1)

Scientific classification
- Kingdom: Animalia
- Phylum: Chordata
- Class: Amphibia
- Order: Anura
- Family: Rhacophoridae
- Genus: Pseudophilautus
- Species: †P. zimmeri

Binomial name
- †Pseudophilautus zimmeri (Ahl, 1927)

Synonyms
- Rhacophorus zimmeri Ahl, 1927; Philautus zimmeri (Ahl, 1927)

Extinct species of amphibian

Pseudophilautus zimmeri is an extinct species of frog in the family Rhacophoridae. It was endemic to Sri Lanka, where it was recorded from the vicinity of Galle. It is only known from the holotype that was used to describe the species in 1927. The specific name zimmeri honours Carl Wilhelm Erich Zimmer, a German zoologist. Common name Rumassala shrub frog has been coined for it.

== Description ==
Pseudophilautus zimmeri is only known from the holotype, an adult male measuring 31.6 mm (1.24 in) in snout–vent length. The canthal edges are sharp, and the supra-tympanic fold is prominent; the tympanum is visible. The body is slender. The dorsum bears a few scattered glandular warts. The toes are medially webbed, whereas the fingers have dermal fringes. Pseudophilautus zimmeri is most similar to Pseudophilautus fulvus.

Pseudophilautus zimmeri is only known from its holotype collected near Galle, Sri Lanka

== Habitat and conservation ==
Habitat of this species is unknown. The holotype was collected from "Point de Galle", corresponding to the present-day Galle. The species has never been recorded again, despite extensive surveys. At its type locality, P. zimmeri is assumed to have become extinct due to habitat loss caused by urbanization.
