= Pseudophilautus singu =

Sri Lanka short-horned shrub frog

Conservation status
- Endangered (IUCN 3.1)

Scientific classification
- Kingdom: Animalia
- Phylum: Chordata
- Class: Amphibia
- Order: Anura
- Family: Rhacophoridae
- Genus: Pseudophilautus
- Species: P. singu

Binomial name
- Pseudophilautus singu (Meegaskumbura, Manamendra-Arachchi, and Pethiyagoda, 2009)

Synonyms
- Philautus singu Meegaskumbura, Manamendra-Arachchi, and Pethiyagoda, 2009

Species of amphibian

Pseudophilautus singu is a species of frog in the family Rhacophoridae, endemic to southwestern Sri Lanka. It is known from the Kanneliya-Dediyagala-Nakiyadeniya, Kitulgala, and Kottawa Forest Reserves and from the Sinharaja World Heritage Site. The specific name singu is Sinhalese for "horn" and refers to the horn-like tubercles on the upper eyelids of this frog. Common name Sri Lanka short-horned shrub frog has been coined for it.

== Description ==
Four adult males in the type series measure 16.1–16.6 mm (0.6–0.7 in) in snout–vent length; females were not reported. The upper eyelid has a prominent tubercle. The snout is obtusely pointed in dorsal view and rounded laterally. The tympanum is distinct and oval; the supra-tympanic fold is distinct. The finger tips have discs with circum-marginal grooves; there is no webbing nor dermal fringes. The toes are webbed and bear discs with circum-marginal grooves. There are scattered tubercles in the head, back, and the flanks; skin on the throat, chest, belly, and ventral sides of thighs is granular. The head and body are dorsally and laterally brown. The inter-orbital area is dark brown, and there is a W-like marking on the middle of the dorsum. The tympanic region is blackish brown. The upper half of the tympanum is dark brown and its lower half is pale yellowish light brown. The lower flanks are yellow with brown pigment. The limbs have three dark-brown crossbars. The lower parts are dark brown with pale yellow patches.

== Habitat and conservation ==
Pseudophilautus singu occurs in lowland and mid-elevation rainforests at 60–513 m (197–1,683 ft) above sea level. Males have been found perched in vegetation some 0.5–1.5 m (2–5 ft) above the ground. The eggs are laid in a depression in the soil; the eggs are later covered by the female. Development is direct, without free-living tadpole stage.

Pseudophilautus singu has a patchy distribution but is common where it is found, except in Kanneliya where only a few specimens were found. It is considered to be a forest-dependent species. Forest reserves are at risk from encroachment by tea growers, and the associated use of biocides and fertilizers represent an additional threat to this species.
