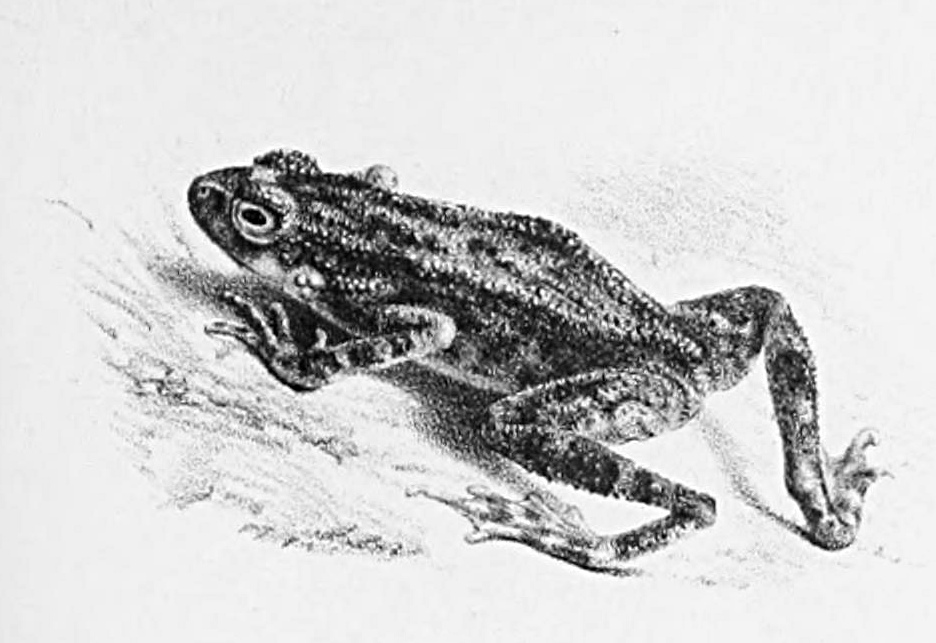
- Adenomus kelaartii

Scientific classification
- Kingdom: Animalia
- Phylum: Chordata
- Class: Amphibia
- Order: Anura
- Family: Bufonidae
- Genus: Adenomus; Cope, 1861

Type species
- Adenomus badioflavus Cope, 1860

= Adenomus =

Genus of amphibians

Adenomus is a small genus of true toads, with only two species, endemic to Sri Lanka. Adenomus kandianus was considered as extinct for 133 years, but was rediscovered in October 2009 in the Kandy area.

== Description ==
Adenomus are slender toads that lack the supraorbital ridge (present in other Sri Lankan bufonids) and have smooth finger edges (versus granular). The largest species is Adenomus kelaartii where females can attain 50 mm (2.0 in) in snout–vent length.

== Species ==
There are two species:

Binomial name and author	Common name
Adenomus kandianus (Günther, 1872)	Kandyan dwarf toad
Adenomus kelaartii (Günther, 1858)	Kelaart's toad

The species are syntopic in parts of their range, but generally speaking Adenomus kandianus is a lower-altitude species whereas Adenomus kelaartii is a high-altitude species.

A third species, Adenomus dasi (Das's dwarf toad) was recognized in 2015 as being a synonym of Adenomus kandianus; the two show some morphological differences but negligible genetic divergence.
