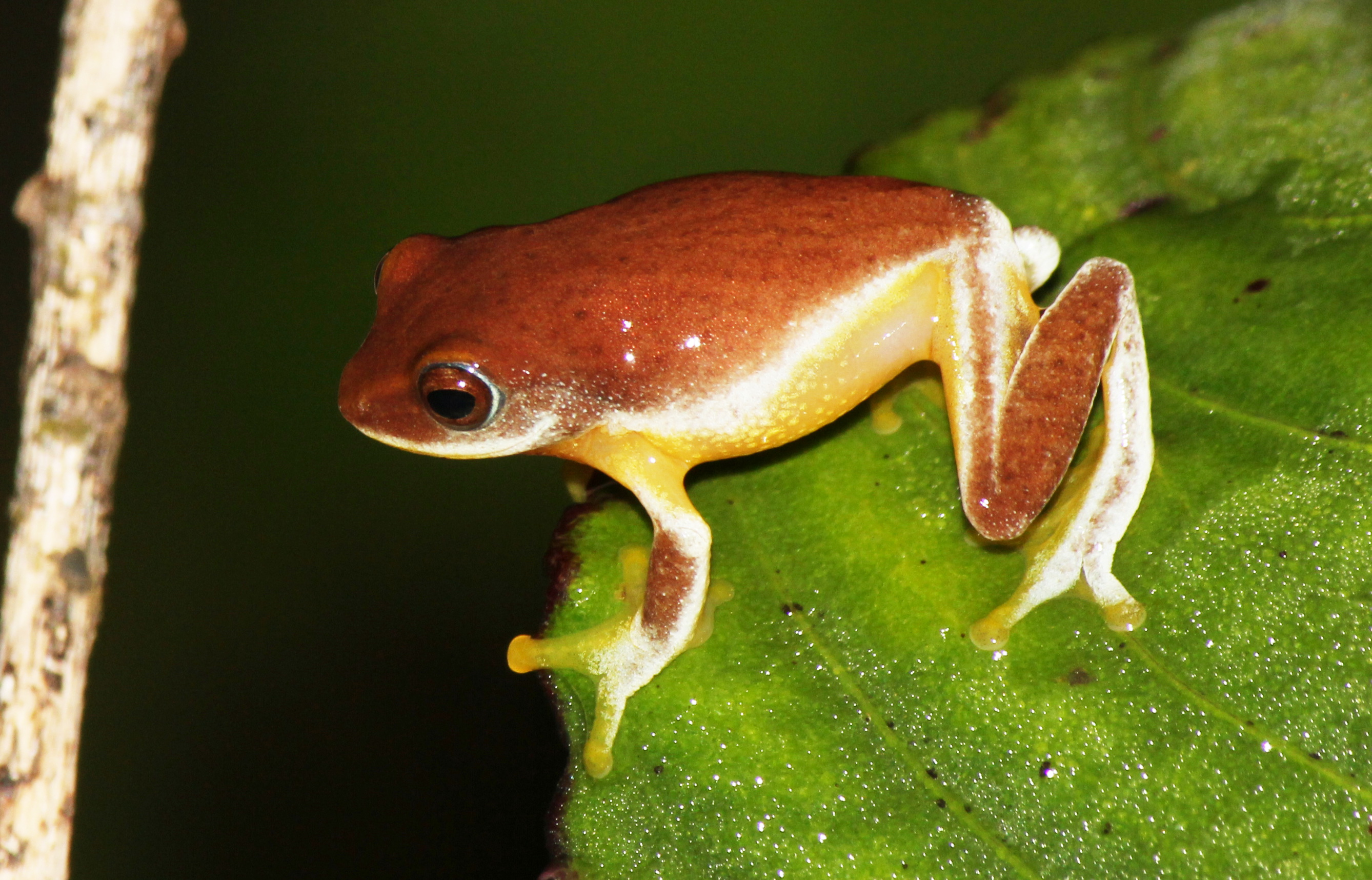

Conservation status
- Endangered (IUCN 3.1)

Scientific classification
- Kingdom: Animalia
- Phylum: Chordata
- Class: Amphibia
- Order: Anura
- Family: Rhacophoridae
- Genus: Pseudophilautus
- Species: P. asankai

Binomial name
- Pseudophilautus asankai (Manamendra-Arachchi & Pethiyagoda, 2004)

Synonyms
- Philautus asankai named Manamendra-Arachchi & Pethiyagoda, 2004

= Pseudophilautus asankai =

Species of amphibian

Pseudophilautus asankai, commonly called Asanka's shrub frog (named after Asanka Goonewardena), is a species of frogs in the family Rhacophoridae.

It is endemic to Sri Lanka.

Its natural habitats are subtropical or tropical moist montane forests and heavily degraded former forest. It lives on shrubs in places where there is a break in the canopy large enough to allow sufficient sunlight.

The adult male frog measures about 21.2 – 23.4 mm in snout-vent length. There is fringed skin on the toes of the front feet and webbed skin on the toes of the hind feet. The skin of the dorsum and tops of the legs is ash-brown in colour. The toes of all four feet, parts of the legs, and the ventrum are yellow in colour. Parts of the frog's middle and back legs have small yellow spots.

Like other frogs in Pseudophilautus, P. asankai undergoes direct development. Small froglets hatch out of eggs without ever undergoing a tadpole stage.

It is threatened by habitat loss.

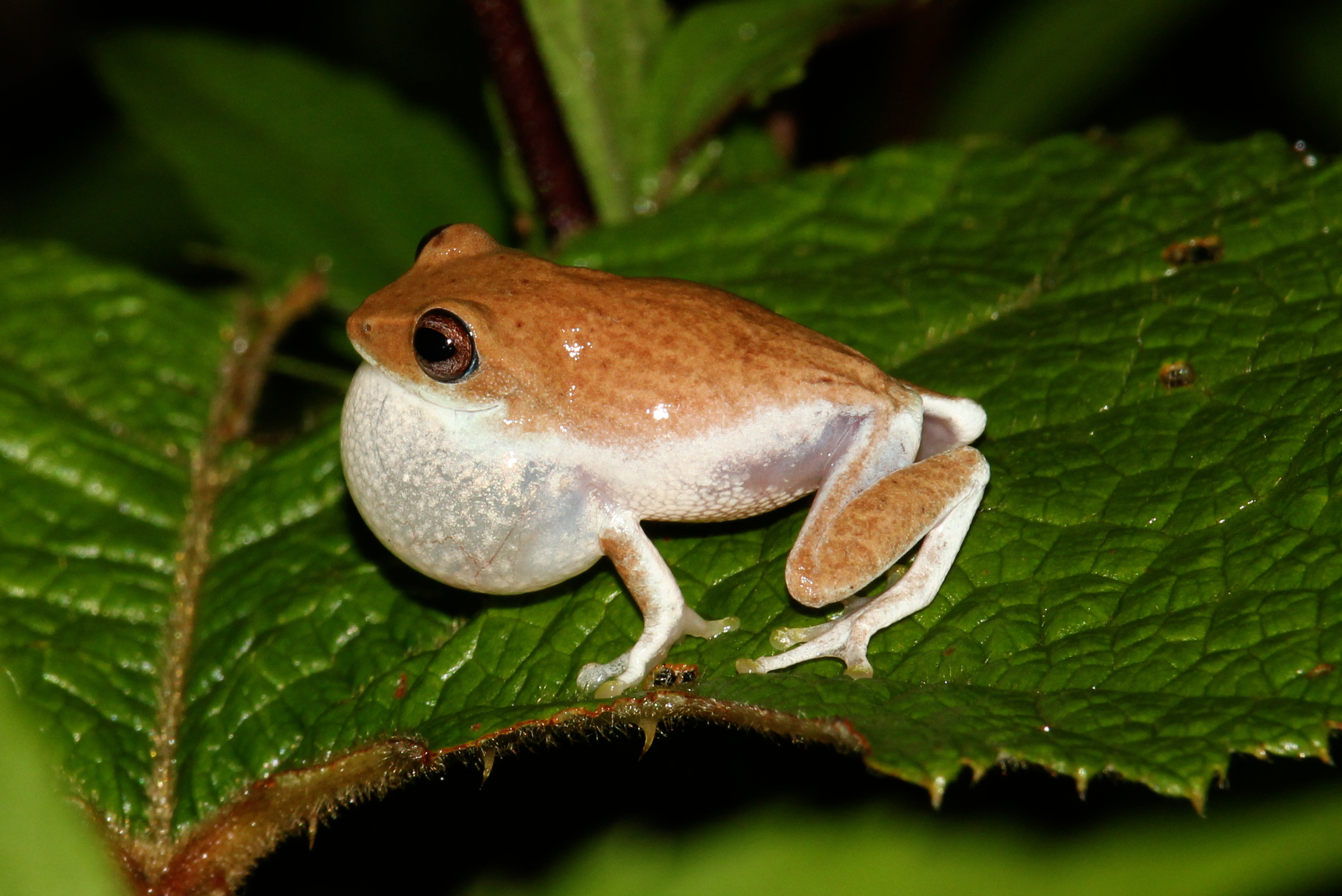
A photograph of this frog considered to be P. hoffmani.

For many years, scientists believed that P. asankai and P. hoffmani were two different species, but they were synonymized in 2021.
