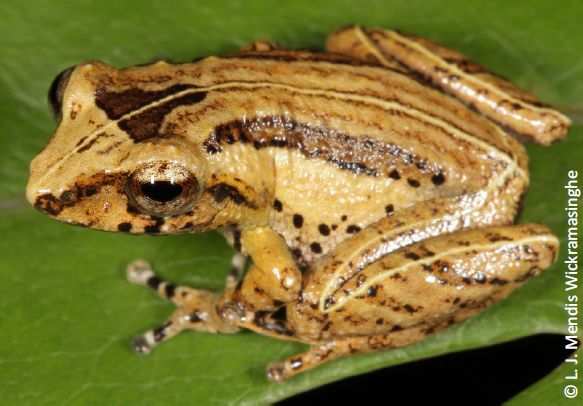
- Pseudophilautus hypomelas from the Peak Wilderness, Central Hills of Sri Lanka.

Conservation status
- Endangered (IUCN 3.1)

Scientific classification
- Kingdom: Animalia
- Phylum: Chordata
- Class: Amphibia
- Order: Anura
- Family: Rhacophoridae
- Genus: Pseudophilautus
- Species: P. hypomelas

Binomial name
- Pseudophilautus hypomelas (Günther, 1876)

Synonyms
- Ixalus hypomelas Günther, 1876; Rhacophorus hypomelas (Günther, 1876); Philautus hypomelas (Günther, 1876)

= Pseudophilautus hypomelas =

Species of amphibian

Pseudophilautus hypomelas is a species of frog in the family Rhacophoridae endemic to Sri Lanka. It is sometimes referred to as the webless shrub frog. In 2004 it was declared extinct by the International Union for Conservation of Nature when, despite extensive field efforts, no specimen had been seen in the wild after the species was described by Albert Günther in 1876. However, this frog was rediscovered in 2010 in the Peak Wilderness, a highly biodiverse area in the Central Highlands of Sri Lanka. Thus, this species had been "lost" for more than 130 years.

== History ==
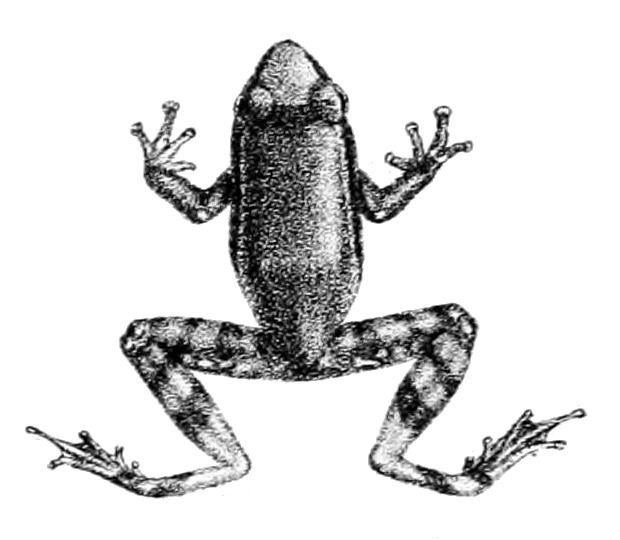
Pseudophilautus hypomelas — one of the syntypes in the Natural History Museum, London.

The species was described by Albert Günther, a German-born British zoologist, in 1876 based on a collection of 14 syntype specimens by colonel Richard Henry Beddome and W. Ferguson. The latter collection can be pinpointed to the present-day Nuwara Eliya District, whereas the exact location of Beddome's specimens is unknown. Despite extensive field studies, there was no later record of this species, and it was classified as "Extinct" by IUCN in that 2004. However, in April 2010, during field surveys of amphibians in the Peak Wilderness Sanctuary, researchers encountered about 40 frogs that resembled Pseudophilautus hypomelas. Initially thought to represent a new species, a careful study of these specimens and Günther's syntypes confirmed that these frogs actually were Pseudophilautus hypomelas, and the species was redescribed based on fresh specimens by a group of Sri Lankan scientists in 2013.

== Description ==
Pseudophilautus hypomelas is a relatively small frog. Its snout–vent length is 17–22 mm (0.67–0.87 in), with males being smaller than females. The species has characteristic markings on its dorsum: a pair of broad bronze longitudinal bands from the back of the eye to the groin, and a T- or triangle-shaped bronze band between the eyes. Some specimens also have a prominent white stripe running from the tip of the snout to anus and below.

== Habitat and distribution ==
The newly discovered Pseudophilautus hypomelas were found in elevations of 750–1,400 m (2,460–4,590 ft) in lower montane rain forests, not far from the Adam's Peak in the Peak Wilderness. They were commonly observed in bushes close (<1 m) to the ground. The species seems to prefer grassy habitats without full canopy cover, such as those in disturbed areas. Günther's specimens were from a different location, from Nuwara Eliya District (to the extent that the location is known).

== Conservation ==
Pseudophilautus hypomelas has not been reassessed by IUCN, but Wickramasinghe et al. suggest that it should now be classified as "endangered", given that the species is only known from a single, small area, and that there are severe anthropogenic threats to the habitat, despite being located in Peak Wilderness Sanctuary, a protected area.
