= Pseudophilautus stellatus =

Conservation status
- Critically Endangered (IUCN 3.1)

Scientific classification
- Kingdom: Animalia
- Phylum: Chordata
- Class: Amphibia
- Order: Anura
- Family: Rhacophoridae
- Genus: Pseudophilautus
- Species: P. stellatus

Binomial name
- Pseudophilautus stellatus (Kelaart, 1853)
- Pseudophilautus stellatus is only known from the Peak Wilderness in central Sri Lanka

Synonyms
- Polypedates stellata Kelaart, 1853; Rhacophorus (Rhacophorus) stellatus (Kelaart, 1853); Philautus (Kirtixalus) stellatus (Kelaart, 1853); Philautus stellatus (Kelaart, 1853); Kirtixalus stellatus (Kelaart, 1853)

Species of amphibian

Pseudophilautus stellatus, also known as starry shrub frog or Kelaart's starry shrub frog, is a frog species in the family Rhacophoridae. It is endemic to Sri Lanka. It was thought to be extinct for 156 years until it was rediscovered in 2009 from the Peak Wilderness, Central Hills of Sri Lanka. This species was previously only known by the lost holotype which was described by Edward Frederick Kelaart in 1853. In 2013, a neotype was designated.

== Description ==
Pseudophilautus stellatus reaches a snout–vent length of 40–55 mm (1.6–2.2 in) (two males and one female of intermediate size). The head is concave above. The snout is rounded. The interorbital space and the internasal space are concave. The canthus rostralis is rounded; the loreal region is concave. The tympanum is indistinct. The vomerine teeth are present. The lingual papilla is absent. The fingers have rudimentary webbing; the toes are basally webbed. Both fingers and toes bear large discs. Tubercles on hands and feet are present. The snout, the interorbital area, the sides of head, the dorsum, and the dorsal thigh are weakly shagreen. The upper flank is shagreen to weakly areolate. The lower flank is weakly areolate to granulate. The throat is weakly granular. The body is bright green decorated with intermittent pinkish white spots outlined in dark brown. The flanks have transverse dark brown bands on white background.

== Habitat and conservation ==
Pseudophilautus stellatus were found in a cloud forest at elevations of 1,540–1,679 m (5,052–5,509 ft) above sea level. They are nocturnal and live in the canopy, some 1–10 m (3 ft 3 in – 32 ft 10 in) above the ground. It is a rare species known from an area totaling just 2 km^{2} (0.77 sq mi). The area has suffered from a forest dieback, and invasive species are also a threat. It also suffers from severe anthropogenic pressures caused by tourism and illegal gem mining. Moreover, tea plantations in the surrounding area are expanding.
