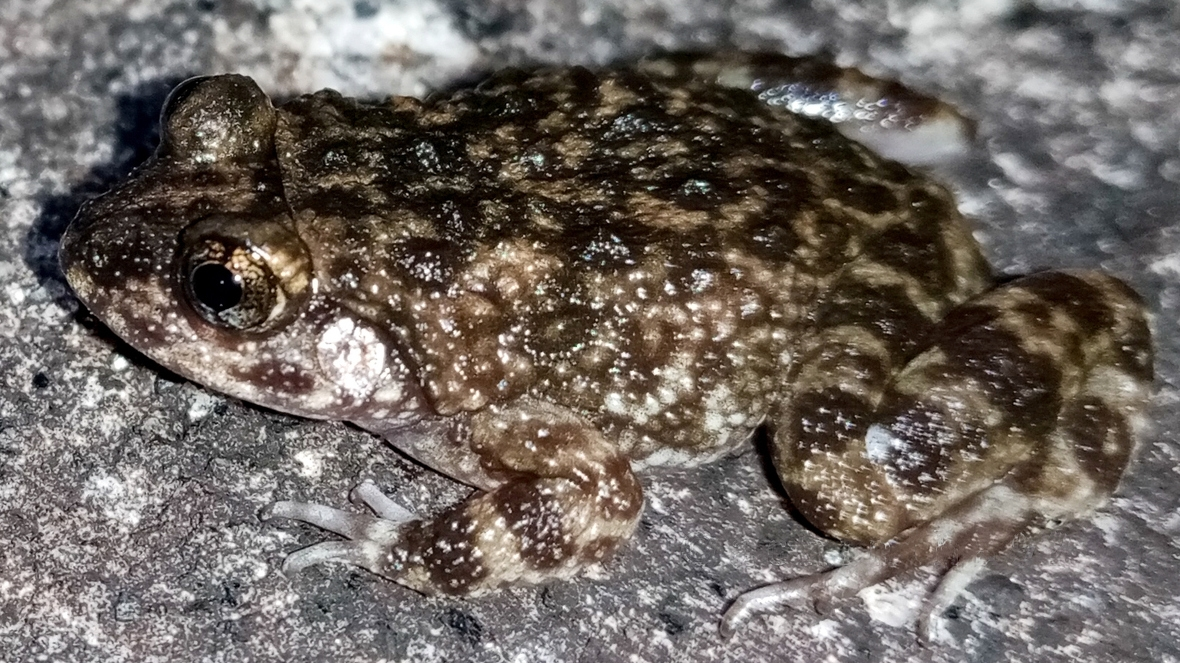

Conservation status
- Endangered (IUCN 3.1)

Scientific classification
- Kingdom: Animalia
- Phylum: Chordata
- Class: Amphibia
- Order: Anura
- Family: Dicroglossidae
- Genus: Nannophrys
- Species: N. naeyakai

Binomial name
- Nannophrys naeyakai Fernando, Wickramasinghe, and Rodirigo, (Note: The surname of Roshan K. Rodirigo is often misspelled as Rodrigo) 2007
- Nannophrys naeyakai is only known from two localities in Sri Lanka

= Nannophrys naeyakai =

Species of amphibian

Nannophrys naeyakai, also known as the Sri Lanka tribal rock-frog or Sri Lanka tribal rock frog, is a species of frogs in the family Dicroglossidae. It was described as a new species in 2007. It is endemic to Sri Lanka, where it is only known from two localities in Ampara and Monaragala Districts. N. naeyakai can be distinguished from the other Nannophrys species by the details of the tubercles on the fourth toe, sharp and narrow symphysial knob on the anterior edge of mandible and small palmar tubercles. The specific name naeyakai refers to the "naeyaka", spirits of deceased relatives in the believes of Vedda people living in the type locality area.

== Description ==
Adult males measure 24–36 mm (0.9–1.4 in) and adult females 32–44 mm (1.3–1.7 in) in snout–vent length. The head is depressed and wider than it is long. The snout is rounded. The tympanum is distinct. The finger and toe tips are bluntly rounded; no webbing is present. Skin is somewhat rough dorsally with warty pustules on the flanks. The venter is smooth. The upper surfaces are brown with yellow-white marbling. The limbs have yellow-white cross bars. The venter is yellow-white without any markings.

== Habitat and conservation ==
Nannophrys naeyakai is associated with seasonal streams with rock crevices on hillsides at elevations between 200–620 m (660–2,030 ft) above sea level. Vegetation consists of scattered trees, and there is a ground cover of grasses dominated by Cymbopogon species. It is only active for a short period December–February, as the streams it lives in are seasonal. Outside the rainy season it hides underground. The species is more active during the night than at day time.

This species is quite common at its two known locations, but searches at other hilltops in eastern Sri Lanka have not revealed new populations. Threats to its habitat include changing land use practices (i.e., burning of the grassland, felling of trees) that reduce water retention and eventually impact the small streams that this species depend on. This species is found in the Kokagala Forest Reserve.
