= Pseudophilautus hankeni =

Hanken's shrub frog

Conservation status
- Endangered (IUCN 3.1)

Scientific classification
- Kingdom: Animalia
- Phylum: Chordata
- Class: Amphibia
- Order: Anura
- Family: Rhacophoridae
- Genus: Pseudophilautus
- Species: P. hankeni

Binomial name
- Pseudophilautus hankeni Meegaskumbura & Manamendra-Archchi, 2011

Species of amphibian

Pseudophilautus hankeni, or Hanken's shrub frog, is a species of frog in the family Rhacophoridae, endemic to the Knuckles Mountain Range, Sri Lanka. It has been observed at altitudes of 1200 meters over sea level and higher.

Its natural habitats are high-elevation montane forests of Sri Lanka. It is threatened by habitat loss and climate warming. Pseudophilautus dilmah, which was discovered in April 2015, is described as sister taxon of P. hankeni, though another study in 2021 found them synonymous. This frog has been observed perched in shrubs 1–2 meters above the ground. They have been found in primary forest, in secondary forests with considerable regrowth, and in disturbed open areas.

The adult male frog measures 19.2 mm long in snout-vent length and the adult female frog about 20.0 mm long. The skin of the dorsum is cream-white in color with light brown marks and a dark brown intraorbital line with two dots behind it. There are two light brown bands down the body. The flanks are lighter in color with some olive green color. The throat, stomach, and webbed skin are light in color. This frog undergoes direct development, hatching as small froglets with no free-swimming tadpole stage.

Scientists named this frog after developmental biologist Jim Hanken, director of Harvard University's Museum of Comparative Zoology.
