= Pseudophilautus maia =

Conservation status
- Extinct (IUCN 3.1)

Scientific classification
- Kingdom: Animalia
- Phylum: Chordata
- Class: Amphibia
- Order: Anura
- Family: Rhacophoridae
- Genus: Pseudophilautus
- Species: †P. maia

Binomial name
- †Pseudophilautus maia (Meegaskumbara et al., 2007)

Synonyms
- Philautus maia Meegaskumbara et al., 2007

Extinct species of amphibian

Pseudophilautus maia, also known as the Maia shrub frog, is an extinct species of Sri Lankan shrub frogs described in 2007 from a single female museum specimen collected around 1860. It is housed at the Natural History Museum, London. It was named Top 4 New Species of 2007 by Arizona State University's International Institute for Species Exploration.

This species differs from all other Sri Lankan frogs in having a discernible tympanum, an angle of the snout of about 100 degrees, having a distinct supratympanic fold, sharp canthal ridges, supernumerary tubercles on fingers but not on toes, extensive toe webbing, and dark brown reticulation on the posterior surface of the thigh, and in lacking a lingual papilla and tarsal tubercle.

The specific epithet maia ("good mother") was chosen to refer to the parental care the frog may have performed in life. The collected specimen had eggs attached to its belly. It is possible the female may have carried the eggs with it, as some frogs do, but it is more likely that it was positioned on a nest when it died.
