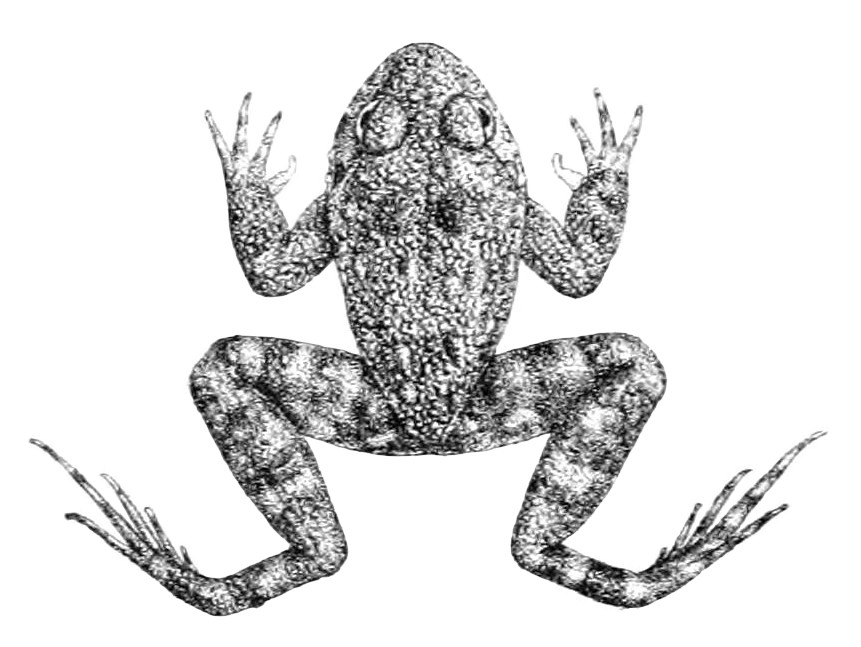
- † Nannophrys guentheri

Scientific classification
- Kingdom: Animalia
- Phylum: Chordata
- Class: Amphibia
- Order: Anura
- Family: Dicroglossidae
- Subfamily: Dicroglossinae
- Genus: Nannophrys; Günther, 1869

Type species
- Nannophrys ceylonensis Günther, 1869

= Nannophrys =

Genus of amphibians

Nannophrys is a genus of frogs endemic to Sri Lanka. It used to be placed in the large frog family Ranidae but a phylogenetic study was undertaken using DNA sequences and it is now included in the family Dicroglossidae. They are sometimes known under the common name streamlined frogs.

== Ecology ==
Nannophrys species are flat-bodied frogs that are adapted to live among narrow, horizontal rock crevices near clear-water streams.

== Species ==
Four species are placed in the genus:

- Nannophrys ceylonensis Günther, 1869
- †Nannophrys guentheri Boulenger, 1882 (extinct)
- Nannophrys marmorata Kirtisinghe, 1946
- Nannophrys naeyakai Fernando, Wickramasinghe, and Rodrigo, 2007
