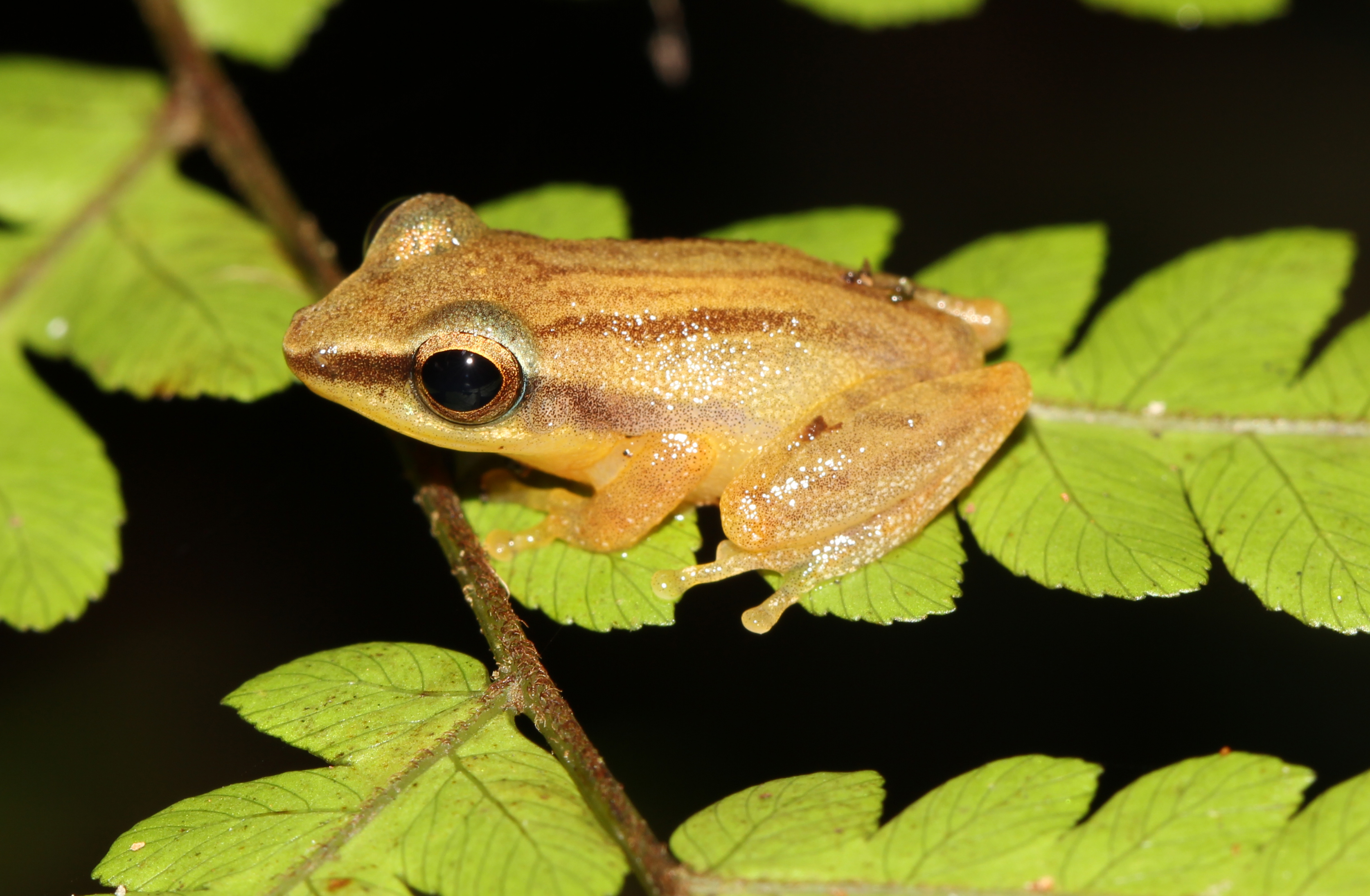

Conservation status
- Endangered (IUCN 3.1)

Scientific classification
- Kingdom: Animalia
- Phylum: Chordata
- Class: Amphibia
- Order: Anura
- Family: Rhacophoridae
- Genus: Pseudophilautus
- Species: P. tanu

Binomial name
- Pseudophilautus tanu (Meegaskumbura, Manamendra-Arachchi, and Pethiyagoda, 2009)

Synonyms
- Philautus tanu Meegaskumbura, Manamendra-Arachchi, and Pethiyagoda, 2009

= Pseudophilautus tanu =

Sri Lanka petite shrub frog

Species of amphibian

Pseudophilautus tanu, commonly known as the Sri Lanka petite shrub frog, is a species of frog in the family Rhacophoridae, endemic to south-western Sri Lanka. This species is only known from two locations in the Galle District, Beraliya and Kanneliya Forest Reserves. The specific name tanu is Sinhalese for "slender" and refers to the habitus of this frog.

== Description ==
Three adult males in the type series measure 13.5–13.9 mm (0.5–0.5 in) in snout–vent length; females were not reported. The snout is obtusely pointed. The tympanum is distinct and vertically elongated. The finger tips have discs with circum-marginal grooves; there is no webbing nor dermal fringes. The toes are webbed and bear discs with circum-marginal grooves. The head and body are dorsally pale brown. There are about eight dark-brown stripes of varying width on the dorsum and a dark-brown stripe about as wide as pupil running from the snout through the pupil backward to the flank, fading away on mid-flank. The lower parts are white with some scattered brown pigment.

== Habitat and conservation ==
Pseudophilautus tanu occurs in forest-edges in open shrub areas of the lowland wet zone of Sri Lanka, 24–45 m (79–148 ft) above sea level. Males have been found sitting on leaves of shrubs about 0.5–1 m (2–3 ft) above the ground.

Pseudophilautus tanu is a common species within its habitat. In Kanneliya, it was the most common species in the fern-dominated habitat, along with Pseudophilautus hoipollo. Nevertheless, unprotected forest edge areas are under constant pressure from human activities.
