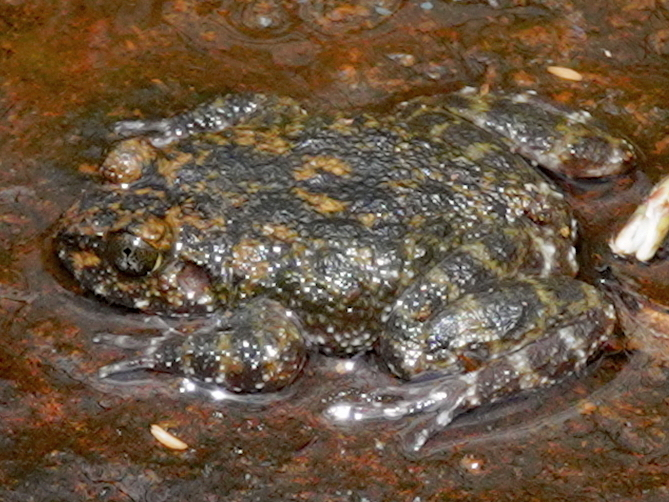

Conservation status
- Endangered (IUCN 3.1)

Scientific classification
- Kingdom: Animalia
- Phylum: Chordata
- Class: Amphibia
- Order: Anura
- Family: Dicroglossidae
- Genus: Nannophrys
- Species: N. marmorata

Binomial name
- Nannophrys marmorata Kirtisinghe, 1946

= Nannophrys marmorata =

Species of amphibian

Nannophrys marmorata, commonly known as Kirtisinghe's rock frog or marbled streamlined frog, is a species of frog endemic to Sri Lanka. It used to be placed in the large frog family Ranidae but a phylogenetic study was undertaken using DNA sequences and it is now included in the family Dicroglossidae. Its natural habitats are tropical moist lowland forests, moist montane forests, rivers and streams. It is threatened by habitat loss.

== Description ==
Kirtisinghe's rock frog is a small animal with a broad, short head and rounded snout. The eardrums, visible just behind the prominent eyes, are about half the size of the eyes. The body is stout and the legs are moderately short. The dorsal surface is brown blotched with darker streaks and the ventral surface is pale grey. The legs are transversely banded in dark brown. Kirtisinghe's rock frog grows to a length of about 2.5 cm (1 in).

== Distribution and habitat ==
Kirtisinghe's rock frog is endemic to central Sri Lanka where it is found only in the Knuckles Mountain Range at heights between 200 and 1,200 metres (660 and 3,940 ft) above sea level. It is a semi-aquatic species and is found in and beside fast flowing mountain streams in forested areas, under boulders, in rock crevices and on wet rocks. The tadpoles are also found on rocks in the splash zone near the torrent.

== Status ==
Kirtisinghe's rock frog seems to be declining in numbers and it is listed as "Critically endangered" in the IUCN Red List of Threatened Species. This is because it occurs as several separate populations in a total area of only 100 square kilometres (39 sq mi) and its habitat is being lost because of livestock grazing and tourism, and the streams in which it lives may be being polluted by agrochemicals from tea and cardamom plantations.
