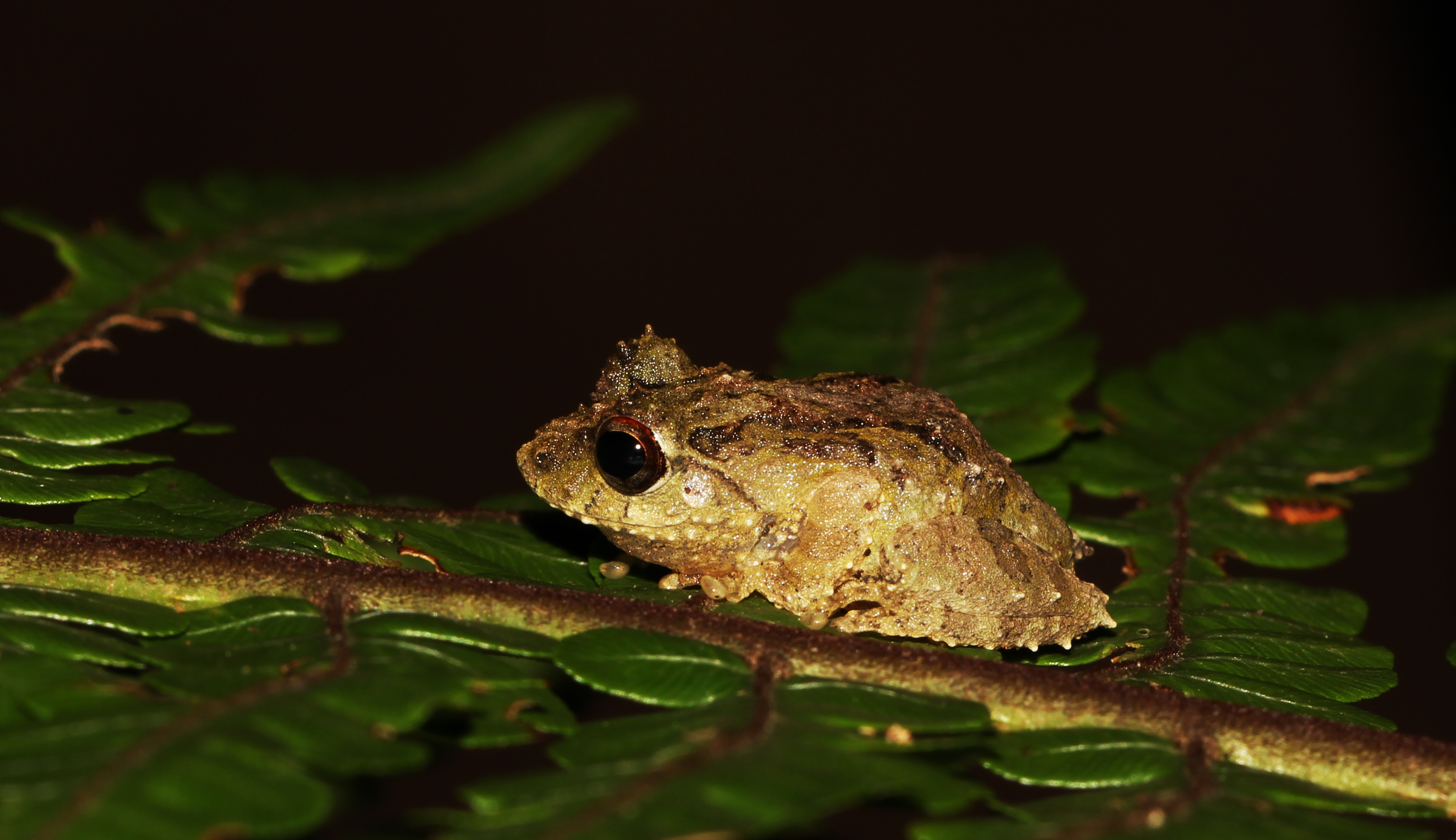

Scientific classification
- Kingdom: Animalia
- Phylum: Chordata
- Class: Amphibia
- Order: Anura
- Family: Rhacophoridae
- Genus: Pseudophilautus
- Species: P. dilmah

Binomial name
- Pseudophilautus dilmah (Wickramasinghe et al, 2015)

= Pseudophilautus dilmah =

Dilmah shrub frog

Species of amphibian

Pseudophilautus dilmah, the Dilmah shrub frog, is a species of frogs in the family Rhacophoridae, endemic to Sri Lanka. The species was discovered and documented in 2015 by Sri Lankan prominent wildlife researcher and herpetologist Mendis Wickramasinghe and his crew from Loolkandura forest of Central highlands of Sri Lanka, 1324 meters above sea level. It is distinguished mainly from other shrub frogs by the absence of nuptial pads and anterior and posterior dorsum without horny spinules.

Its natural habitats are wet highland forests of Sri Lanka. As other frogs in the island, it is thought to be threatened by habitat loss and other anthropogenic works. The frog was named after Dilmah Conservation.

== Taxonomy ==
It is one of the 87 species of Pseudophilautus and its sister taxon is thought to be Pseudophilautus hankeni.
