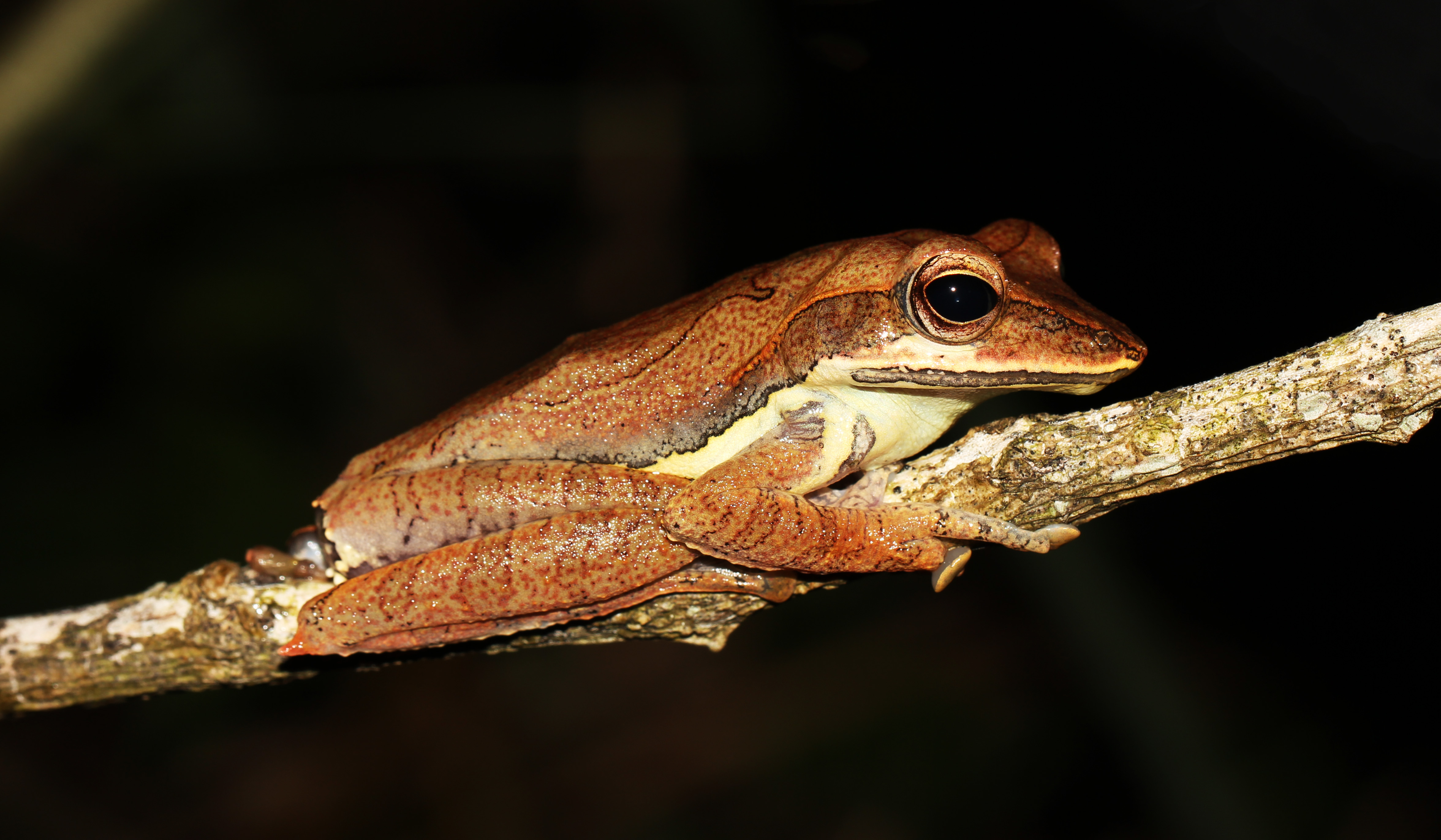

Conservation status
- Endangered (IUCN 3.1)

Scientific classification
- Kingdom: Animalia
- Phylum: Chordata
- Class: Amphibia
- Order: Anura
- Family: Rhacophoridae
- Genus: Taruga
- Species: T. fastigo

Binomial name
- Taruga fastigo (Manamendra-Arachchi and Pethiyagoda, 2001)

Synonyms
- Polypedates fastigo Manamendra-Arachchi and Pethiyagoda, 2001

= Taruga fastigo =

Species of amphibian

Taruga fastigo is a species of frogs in the family Rhacophoridae. It is endemic to Sri Lanka and only known from its type locality, Morningside Estate near Rakwana. Prior to its description in 2001, it was confused with Polypedates eques (now Taruga eques).

== Etymology ==
The specific name fastigo is Latin for "sharpened" and refers to the pointed snout of the species.

== Description ==
Adult males measure 35–40 mm (1.4–1.6 in) and females 55–64 mm (2.2–2.5 in) in snout–vent length. The snout is pointed. The canthus rostralis is angular, and the canthal ridges are sharp. The tympanum is visible and the supratympanic fold is distinct. The fingers and toes have well-developed discs; the fingers are free from webbing whereas the toes are webbed. Skin is mostly smooth but granular on the abdomen and underside of the femur. There are prominent white tubercles around the vent and lower surfaces of the thighs. Dorsal colouration is brown or olive green, and the dorsum bears an incomplete, dark-brown hourglass-shaped marking. There is a black line on the lower flank that connects the axilla and groin. The canthal ridge and supratympanic fold are red. The lips have black edges. The venter is white or pale yellow.

A late-stage tadpole (Gosner stage 44) measures 40 mm (1.6 in) in total length, with body length of 17 mm (0.67 in).

Taruga fastigo is only known from its type locality, Morningside Estate near Rakwana, Sri Lanka.

== Habitat and conservation ==
The only known population inhabits montane tropical moist forest at about 1,060 m (3,480 ft) above sea level. Taruga fastigo is an arboreal species, and adults are typically are found on twigs and leaves in bushes up to 2 m (6 ft 7 in) above the ground. They typically occur close to shallow, stagnant pools where breeding takes place (based on the presence of tadpoles—breeding has not been observed, but is presumed to involve a foam nest).

Taruga fastigo is a rare species that is threatened by habitat loss and degradation. It is present in the Morningside Forest Reserve, although pressure from land use is also present in the reserve.
