= Pseudophilautus limbus =

Conservation status
- Endangered (IUCN 3.1)

Scientific classification
- Kingdom: Animalia
- Phylum: Chordata
- Class: Amphibia
- Order: Anura
- Family: Rhacophoridae
- Genus: Pseudophilautus
- Species: P. limbus

Binomial name
- Pseudophilautus limbus (Manamendra-Arachchi and Pethiyagoda, 2005)

Synonyms
- Philautus limbus Manamendra-Arachchi and Pethiyagoda, 2004

Species of frog

Pseudophilautus limbus, also known as Haycock shrub frog, is a species of frogs in the family Rhacophoridae. It is endemic to southwestern Sri Lanka, including its type locality, Haycock Hill (Hiniduma) Forest Reserve. The specific name limbus, from the Latin for "edge" or "border", refers to the species originally having been known only from the border of the Haycock Hill Forest Reserve.

== Description ==
The holotype, an adult male, measures 26 mm (1.0 in) in snout–vent length. The body is slender. The head is dorsally concave. The snout is obtusely pointed in lateral view. The tympanum is visible and oval in shape. The supratympanic fold is prominent. The toes are partially webbed. The dorsal coloration is white with dark-brown and reddish-orange patches. The flanks are whitish and have a few dark-brown patches. The upper lip is dark brown and has white and black patches. The lower parts are ashy white.

== Habitat and conservation ==
Pseudophilautus limbus occurs along the forest edge in tea plantations, home gardens, and grasslands, and within lowland forests, at elevations of 61–660 m (200–2,165 ft) above sea level. It presumably has direct development (i.e., there is no free-living larval stage). It tolerates habitat modification and can be locally common. It is, nevertheless, believed to suffer from the loss of its habitat and from deterioration of habitat quality. Future climate change prolonging the dry period is also a potential threat. It is present in two forest reserves, its type locality and the Kanneliya Forest Reserve.
