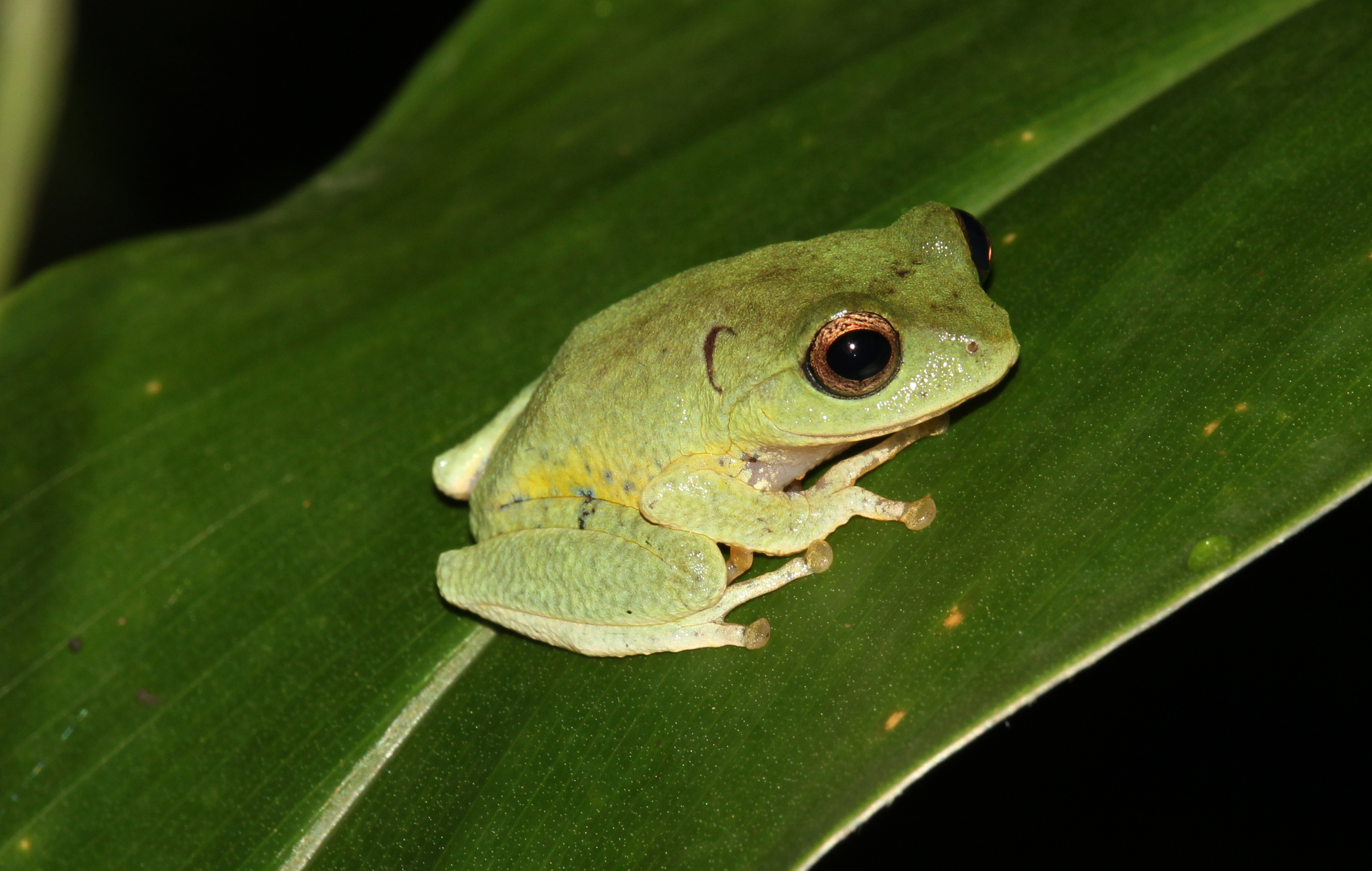

Conservation status
- Endangered (IUCN 3.1)

Scientific classification
- Kingdom: Animalia
- Phylum: Chordata
- Class: Amphibia
- Order: Anura
- Family: Rhacophoridae
- Genus: Pseudophilautus
- Species: P. viridis

Binomial name
- Pseudophilautus viridis (Manamendra-Arachchi and Pethiyagoda, 2005)

Synonyms
- Philautus viridis Manamendra-Arachchi and Pethiyagoda, 2005; Raorchestes viridis (Manamendra-Arachchi and Pethiyagoda, 2005)

= Pseudophilautus viridis =

Species of amphibian

Pseudophilautus viridis, or the dull-green shrub frog, is a species of frogs in the family Rhacophoridae. It is endemic to Sri Lanka and occurs in the central hills of south-central Sri Lanka.

== Description ==
Adult males measure 27.6–31.5 mm (1.09–1.24 in) and females 27.4–36.3 mm (1.08–1.43 in) in snout–vent length. Males usually have horn-like spinules in the dorsum; females are shagreened. The tympanum is not prominent whereas the supratympanic fold is distinct. The canthal edges are indistinct. The fingers are without webbing whereas the toes are medially webbed. The upper parts are light green, except for the upper edge of supratympanic fold and outer edge of upper eyelid that are yellow; some individuals are brown. The flanks are light yellow with light-blue patches. The upper lip is light yellowish-green and the lower one is white. Underparts are flesh coloured.

== Habitat and conservation ==
Pseudophilautus viridis is a habitat generalist that occurs in both open and closed-canopy vegetation, including cloud forests and adjacent man-made habitats, at elevations of 1,555–1,830 m (5,102–6,004 ft) above sea level. They are arboreal, found some 1 to 5 m (3 to 16 ft) above the ground, or in closed-canopy habitats, in the top stratum. The eggs are deposited in a deep hole in the forest floor that the female excavates.

It is an uncommon species whose habitat is declining because of encroachment by tea cultivation and human settlements.
