= Pseudophilautus samarakoon =

Samarakoon's shrub frog

Conservation status
- Critically Endangered (IUCN 3.1)

Scientific classification
- Kingdom: Animalia
- Phylum: Chordata
- Class: Amphibia
- Order: Anura
- Family: Rhacophoridae
- Genus: Pseudophilautus
- Species: P. samarakoon

Binomial name
- Pseudophilautus samarakoon Wickramasinghe et al., 2013

Species of amphibian

Pseudophilautus samarakoon, the Samarakoon's shrub frog, is a species of frogs in the family Rhacophoridae, endemic to Sri Lanka. Wickramasinghe et al. suggest that, following the IUCN Red List criteria, it should be considered "critically endangered" because the extent of occurrence is <100 km^{2}, it is recorded from a single location, and its habitat is under severe threat.

== Habitat ==
Its natural habitats are wet lowland forests of Sri Lanka. Scientists know it exclusively from the type locality: Sripada Peak in the Peak Wilderness, between 1000 and 1400 meters above sea level. It is threatened by habitat loss, which scientists associate with increased urbanization, agriculture, grazing, and logging. It is one of the 8 species of rhacophorids that was discovered from Adam's Peak recently.

== Appearance ==
The adult male frog measures 22.3 mm in snout-vent length and the adult female frog about 22.4–24.6 mm. The skin of the dorsal sides of the body and legs is the cream in color with light brown and dark brown marks. There is a dark brown intraorbital mark and another one in front of the eyes. The ventrum is lighter in color than the back. The throat is brown in color. The webbed skin is light brown in color.

This frog can be distinguished from other frogs in Pseudophilautus by its small size and the fringed skin on its feet.

== Etymology ==
The frog was named after Mr. Ananda Vijith Samarakoon, a leading Sri Lankan wildlife conservationist.
