= Pseudophilautus simba =

Conservation status
- Critically Endangered (IUCN 3.1)

Scientific classification
- Kingdom: Animalia
- Phylum: Chordata
- Class: Amphibia
- Order: Anura
- Family: Rhacophoridae
- Genus: Pseudophilautus
- Species: P. simba

Binomial name
- Pseudophilautus simba (Manamendra-Arachchi & Pethiyagoda, 2005)

Synonyms
- Philautus simba Manamendra-Arachchi & Pethiyagoda, 2005

Species of amphibian

Pseudophilautus simba (Sinharaja shrub frog) is a species of frogs in the family Rhacophoridae endemic to Sri Lanka. It is only known from its type locality in the Morningside Forest Reserve, adjacent to the Sinharaja Forest Reserve, near Rakwana, southern Sri Lanka.

== Description ==
The holotype, a mature male, measures 12.6 mm (0.50 in) in snout–vent length, and the paratypes, three mature females, 14.5–15.6 mm (0.57–0.61 in) SVL. Body is elongate. Head is dorsally convex. Snout is truncate in lateral aspect, snout angle category 5 (angle of snout ~ 97°). Canthal edges are rounded. Loreal region is flat. Interorbital space is convex. Internarial space is flat. Tympanum is distinct, oval, vertical. Pineal ocellus, vomerine ridge, and lingual papilla are all absent. Supratympanic fold is distinct. Cephalic ridges are absent. Skin on head is not co-ossified with skull. Lateral dermal fringe is absent on fingers. Rudimentary webbing is present on fingers. Prepollex is prominent. Toes have rudimentary webbing. Tarsal fold is absent. Calcar is absent. Snout, interorbital area and posterior dorsum are smooth. Dorsum and lateral side of head have glandular warts. Lower flank is granular. Dorsal part of forelimb, thigh, shank, and foot are smooth. Throat and chest are granular, smooth. Belly and underside of thigh are granular, rough. Males have inner vocal slits, but nuptial pad is absent.

== Habitat and conservation ==
It inhabits closed-canopy montane forest and forest fragments within cardamom plantations at about 1,060 m (3,480 ft) asl. It is a ground-dwelling, leaf-litter species. It is a rare species threatened by habitat loss caused by agricultural encroachment, fires, illegal gemstone mining and logging, and human settlement.
