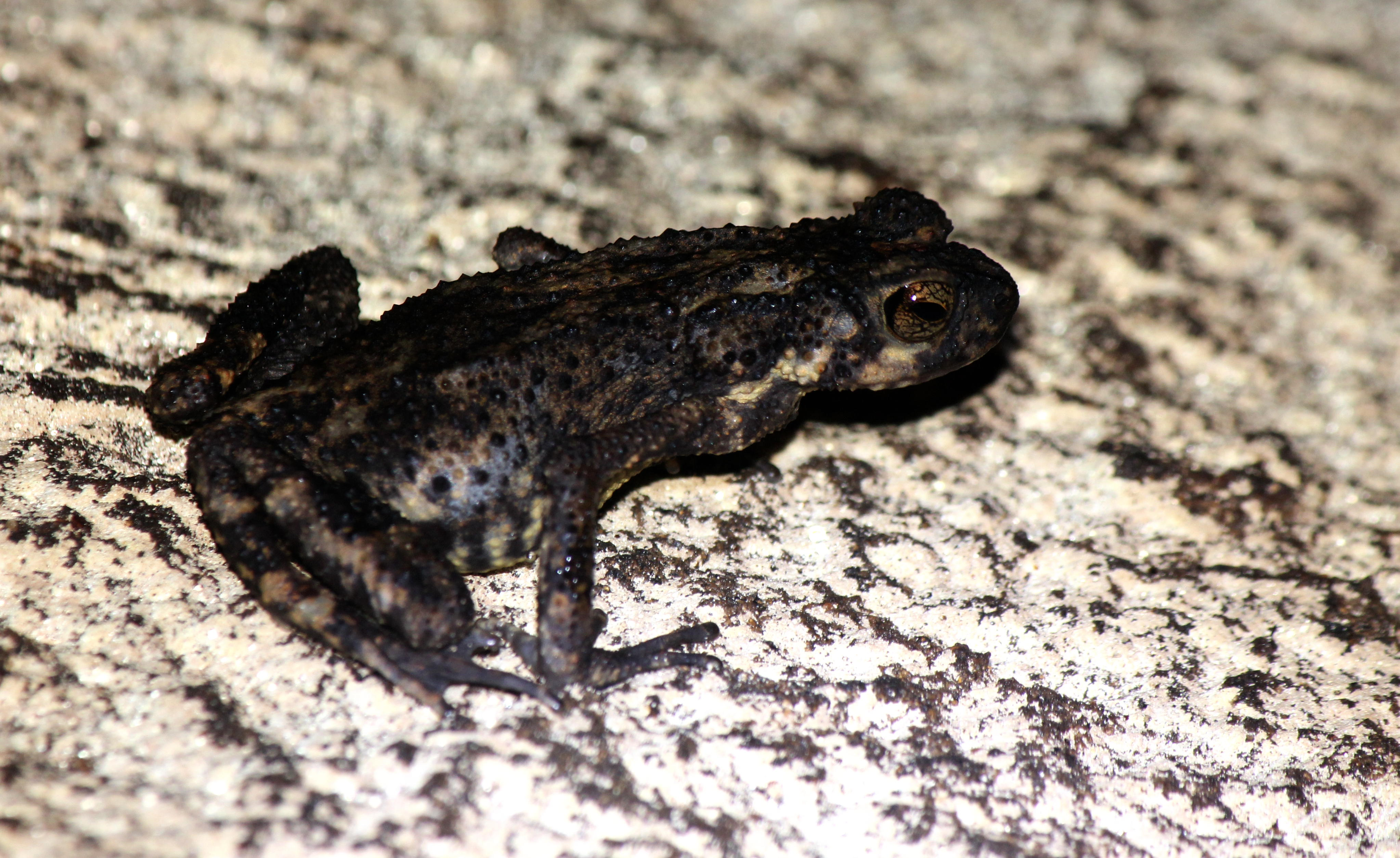

Conservation status
- Vulnerable (IUCN 3.1)

Scientific classification
- Kingdom: Animalia
- Phylum: Chordata
- Class: Amphibia
- Order: Anura
- Family: Bufonidae
- Genus: Adenomus
- Species: A. kelaartii

Binomial name
- Adenomus kelaartii (Günther, 1858)

Synonyms
- Adenomus badioflavus Cope, 1860; Bufo kelaartii Günther, 1858

= Adenomus kelaartii =

Species of amphibian

Adenomus kelaartii (Kelaart's toad or Kelaart's dwarf toad) is a species of toad in the family Bufonidae. It is endemic to Sri Lanka, where it is found in the south-west of the island at elevations between 30 and 1,230 m. The specific name kelaartii honours Edward Frederick Kelaart, a Ceylonese-born physician and zoologist.

== Description ==
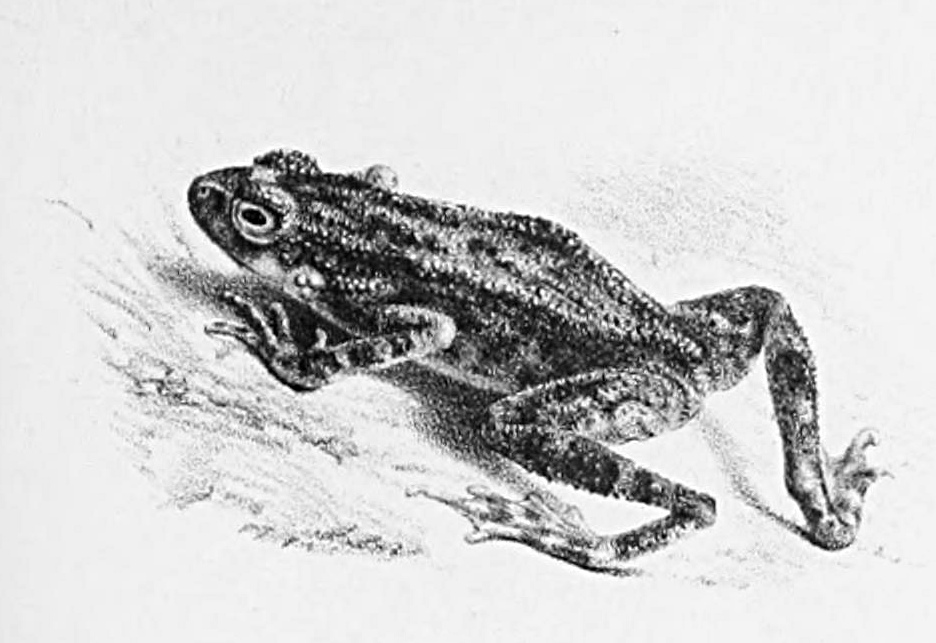
Adenomus kelaartii in Günther's "Catalogue of the Batrachia Salientia in the collection of the British Museum"

Kelaart's toad is a fairly small species with females having a snout-to vent length of 36 to 50 mm (1.4 to 2.0 in) and males 25 to 33 mm (1.0 to 1.3 in). The skin in some individuals is smooth but in others it bears spiny warts. The upper parts are brown more or less blotched with darker colour and the underparts are cream or white, blotched with brown and sometimes speckled with red flecks. In some individuals, there are both red and blue flecks on the underside.

== Distribution and habitat ==
Kelaart's toad is endemic to southwestern Sri Lanka where it is found at altitudes of up to 1,230 m (4,035 ft) above sea level. It does not have a continuous distribution as its range is fragmented into a number of separate locations. Its typical habitat is tropical humid forests where it occurs in the leaf litter on the ground near upland streams. It sometimes climbs into the lower parts of trees and has also been seen on sandbanks beside rivers, in rock crevices, in rotting logs and in holes in trees.

== Biology ==
Kelaart's toad is active both by day and by night. During the breeding season males call from beside bodies of water including mid-stream boulders. Females lay up to one thousand colourless eggs in a single strand, usually in a permanent pool. The tadpoles are also colourless at first but become grey as they develop and later dark brown. Metamorphosis takes place after about seven weeks and the juvenile toads emerging from the water are about 8 to 9 millimetres (0.31 to 0.35 in) long.

== Status ==
Kelaart's toad is fairly common in suitable habitat within its range but it occupies a total area of less than 500 square kilometres (190 sq mi) and the International Union for Conservation of Nature has assessed it as being a "vulnerable species". The chief threats it faces are the destruction of its forest habitat as trees are cut down and the land turned to agricultural use. However it is present in several protected areas and the IUCN advocates better management of these reserves.
