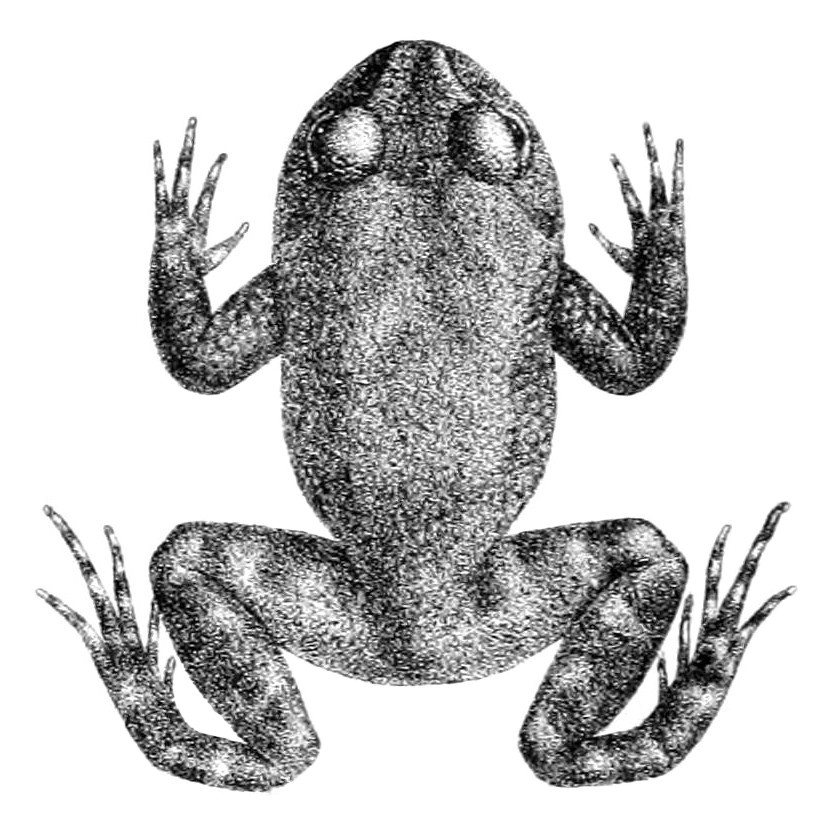

Conservation status
- Vulnerable (IUCN 3.1)

Scientific classification
- Kingdom: Animalia
- Phylum: Chordata
- Class: Amphibia
- Order: Anura
- Family: Dicroglossidae
- Genus: Nannophrys
- Species: N. ceylonensis

Binomial name
- Nannophrys ceylonensis Günther, 1869

= Nannophrys ceylonensis =

Species of amphibian

Nannophrys ceylonensis, commonly known as the Sri Lanka rock frog or the Ceylon streamlined frog, is a species of frog. It used to be placed in the large frog family Ranidae but a phylogenetic study was undertaken using DNA sequences and it is now included in the family Dicroglossidae. It is endemic to Sri Lanka where its natural habitats are subtropical or tropical moist lowland forests, subtropical or tropical moist montane forests, rivers and streams.

== Description ==
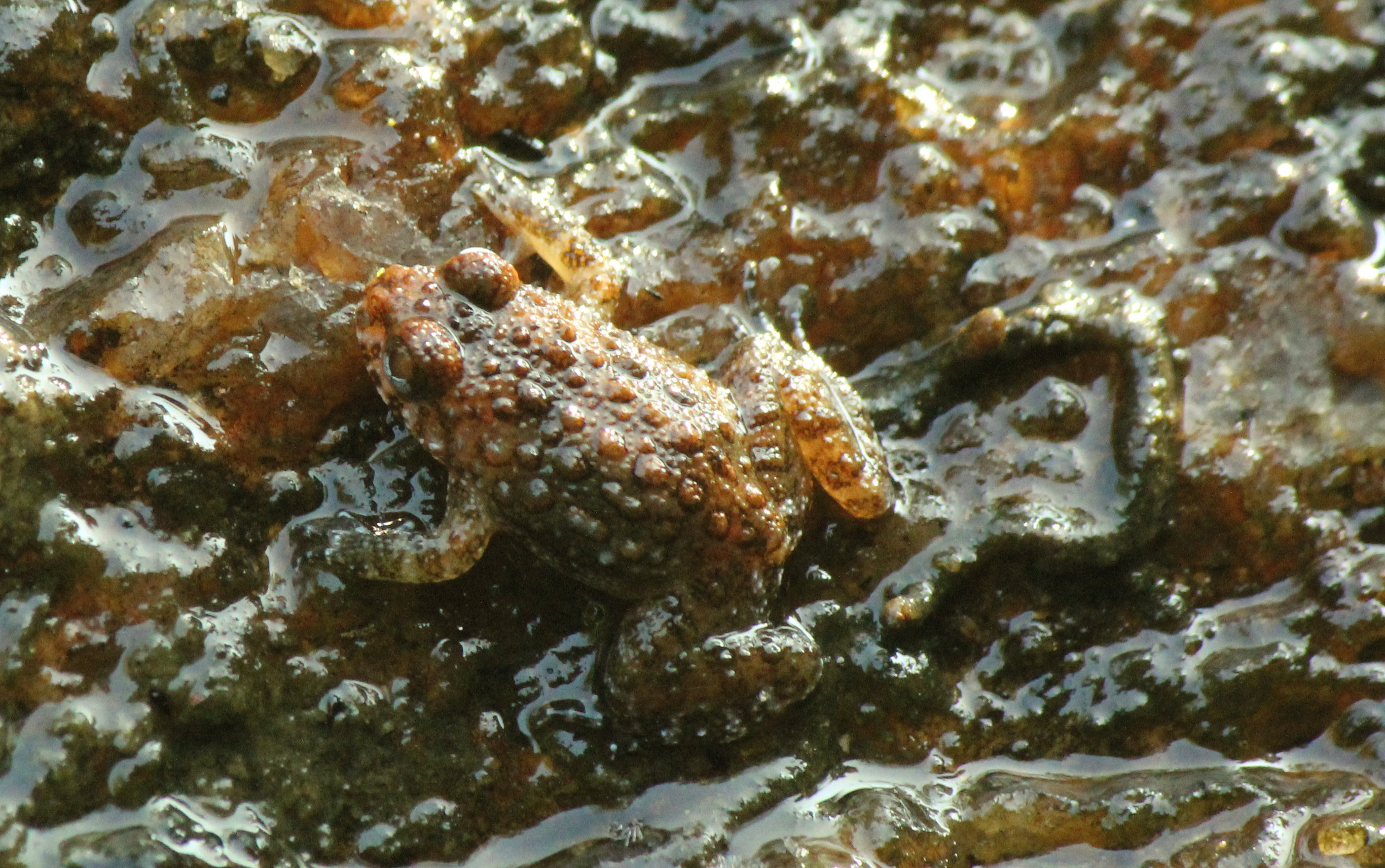
When sitting on rocks Nannophrys ceylonensis is well camouflaged

Female Sri Lanka rock frogs grow to a length of about 5 centimetres (2.0 in) while males grow to 4 centimetres (1.6 in). The colour is olive green or yellowish-brown, mottled with brown patches. The legs have transverse bars of brown. When sitting on alga covered rocks it is well camouflaged.

== Distribution and habitat ==
The Sri Lanka rock frog is endemic to south, central and western Sri Lanka where it is found in wet tropical forests at altitudes of up to 1,200 metres (3,900 ft) above sea level. It is a largely aquatic species and occurs in fast flowing mountain streams, under boulders and on wet rocks beside waterfalls. It is also found on land in disturbed areas where there are suitable breeding locations such as wet seeps. The tadpoles are semi-terrestrial and are sometimes found on wet rocks beside torrents.

== Biology ==
The female Sri Lanka rock frog typically spawns a cluster of eggs in a crevice in the splash zone of a mountain stream. The male frog guards the eggs in several nests and ensures that they are kept moist while the female plays no further part in parental care. The eggs hatch into tadpoles that forage for small invertebrates on the surface of the rocks near their nest.

== Status ==
In the IUCN Red List of Threatened Species, Nannophrys ceylonensis is listed as Vulnerable. This is because numbers seem to be declining and it has several disjunct populations, the total area of its range being less than 2,000 square kilometres (770 square miles). The streams in which it lives and breeds are subject to pollution by agrochemicals and the volume of water is reduced during periods of drought.
