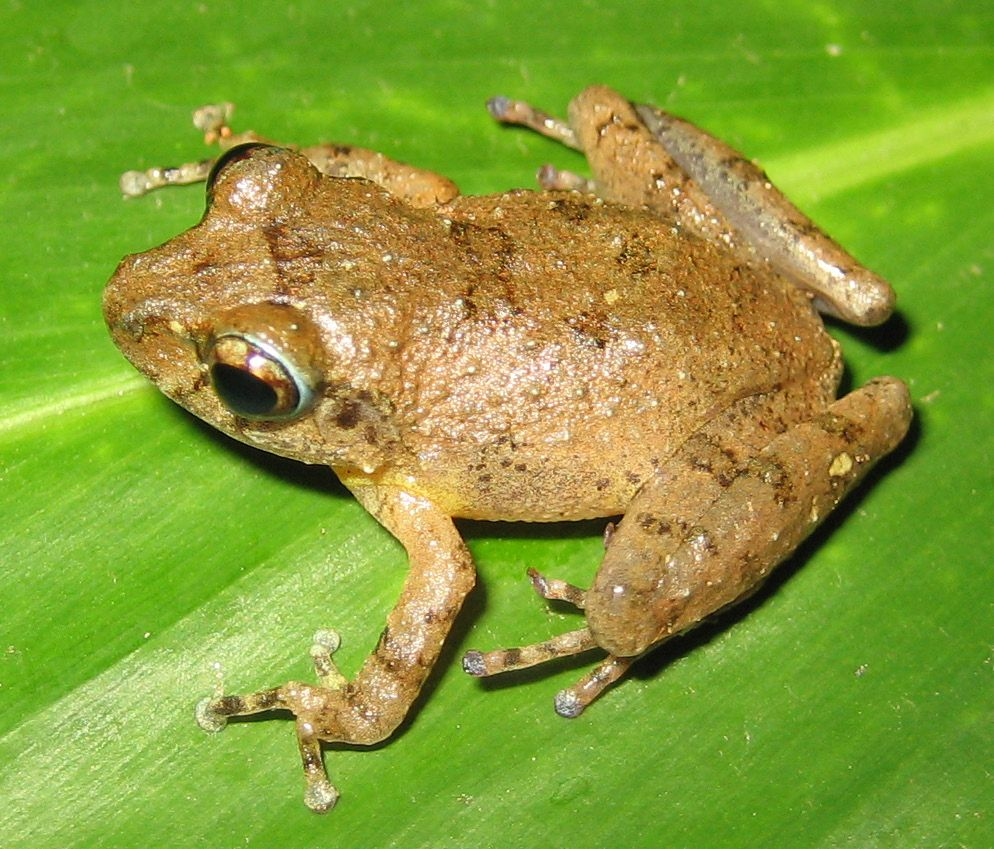
- Adult male from Hantane Range, Kandy

Conservation status
- Near Threatened (IUCN 3.1)

Scientific classification
- Kingdom: Animalia
- Phylum: Chordata
- Class: Amphibia
- Order: Anura
- Family: Rhacophoridae
- Genus: Pseudophilautus
- Species: P. rus

Binomial name
- Pseudophilautus rus (Manamendra-Arachchi & Pethiyagoda, 2004)

Synonyms
- Philautus rus Manamendra-Arachchi & Pethiyagoda, 2004

= Pseudophilautus rus =

Species of amphibian

Pseudophilautus rus, known as Kandian shrub frog is a species of frog in the family Rhacophoridae.

It is endemic to Sri Lanka. Its natural habitats are subtropical or tropical moist lowland forests, rural gardens, and heavily degraded former forest.Scientists have seen it between 500 and 800 meters above sea level.

The adult male frog measures about 20.6 – 24.1 mm in snout-vent length and the adult female frog can be as long as 23.1 mm long.

The skin of the dorsum is dark brown in color. It has dark black marks on the tops of its back legs. The area near the tympanum is dark brown with lighter brown marks. The tympanum itself is red-brown in color. The flanks are light brown and yellow in color. The webbing is dark brown in color.

Like other frogs in Pseudophilautus, P. rus undergoes direct development, hatching as froglets rather than free-swimming tadpoles.

This frog is classified as near threatened. Scientists attribute this to habitat loss from urbanization and because of pollution, pesticides, and fertilizers.

The frog's scientific name, rus, comes from a Latin word that means "countryside" or "farmland." This is because scientists found the frog in the countryside in Kandy.
