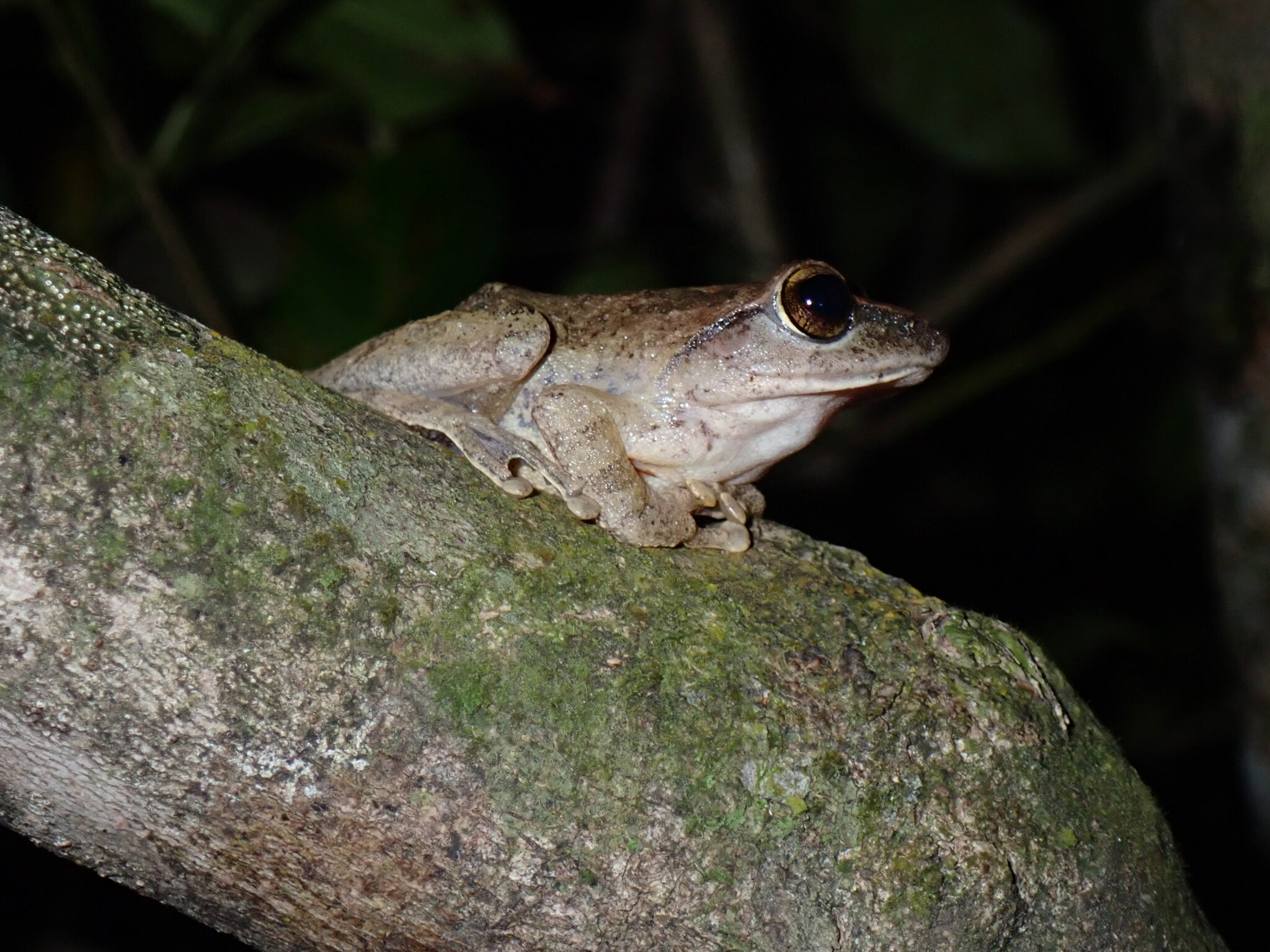

Conservation status
- Endangered (IUCN 3.1)

Scientific classification
- Kingdom: Animalia
- Phylum: Chordata
- Class: Amphibia
- Order: Anura
- Family: Rhacophoridae
- Genus: Pseudophilautus
- Species: P. fulvus

Binomial name
- Pseudophilautus fulvus (Manamendra-Arachchi & Pethiyagoda, 2004)

Synonyms
- Philautus fulvus Manamendra-Arachchi & Pethiyagoda, 2004

= Pseudophilautus fulvus =

Species of amphibian

Pseudophilautus fulvus, or the knuckles shrub frog, is a species of frogs in the family Rhacophoridae.

It is endemic to Sri Lanka. Scientists have seen it in the Knuckles Mountains, between 450 and 1220 meters above sea level.

Its natural habitats are plantations, rural gardens, and heavily degraded former forest. It is threatened by habitat loss.
