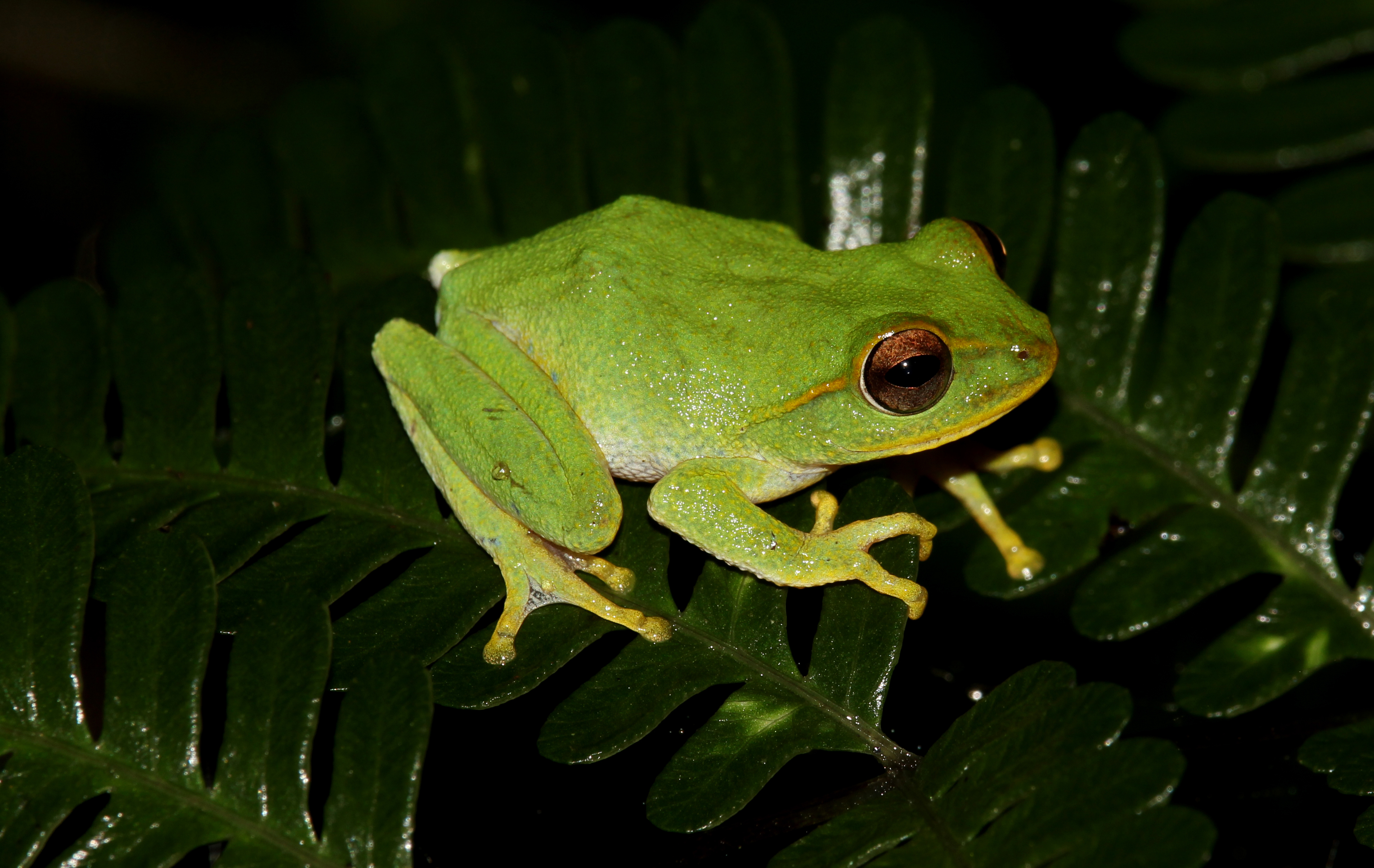

Conservation status
- Critically Endangered (IUCN 3.1)

Scientific classification
- Kingdom: Animalia
- Phylum: Chordata
- Class: Amphibia
- Order: Anura
- Family: Rhacophoridae
- Genus: Pseudophilautus
- Species: P. stuarti

Binomial name
- Pseudophilautus stuarti (Meegaskumbura & Manamendra-Arachchi, 2005)

Synonyms
- Philautus stuarti Meegaskumbura & Manamendra-Arachchi, 2005

= Pseudophilautus stuarti =

Species of amphibian

Pseudophilautus stuarti, known as Stuart's shrub frog, is a species of frogs in the family Rhacophoridae. It is endemic to Sri Lanka. It was first formally observed in Corbett's Gap in the Knuckles Mountain Range, 1249 meters above sea level.

The adult male frog measures 24.2 – 25.3 mm in snout-vent length and the adult female frog about 33.45 mm. The skin of dorsum is light green in color with some darker green marks. The tympanum is green in color and parts of the mouth are yellow. The legs and toes are yellow on the dorsal side and darker yellow-gray on the ventral side. The flanks are yellow in color. There are white tubercules on the belly. Parts of the hind legs are yellow in color.

Its natural habitat is subtropical or tropical moist montane forests.

It is threatened by habitat loss associated with urbanization, grazing, and logging.

== Original description ==
- Meegaskumbura M; Manamendra-Arachchi K (2005). "Description of eight new species of shrub frogs (Ranidae: Rhacophorinae: Philautus) from Sri Lanka". Raffles Bull Zool Suppl. 12: 305–338.
