= Whipping frog (disambiguation) =

The whipping frog is a genus of frogs in the family Rhacophoridae.

Whipping frog may also refer to:

- Blanford's whipping frog, a frog found in China, Laos, Burma, and Vietnam
- Chinese whipping frog, a frog endemic to China
- Günther's whipping frog, a frog endemic to Sri Lanka
- Southern whipping frog, a frog endemic to Sri Lanka
