= Hourglass treefrog (disambiguation) =

The hourglass treefrog is a frog found in Belize, Colombia, Costa Rica, Ecuador, Guatemala, Honduras, Mexico, Nicaragua, and Panama.

Hourglass treefrog may also refer to:

- Common hourglass treefrog, a frog endemic to Sri Lanka
- False hourglass treefrog, a frog endemic to the southern Western Ghats, India
- Montane hourglass treefrog, a frog endemic to Sri Lanka
