= P. eques =

P. eques may refer to:

- Psittacula eques, a parakeet species
- Polypedates eques, a frog species endemic to Sri Lanka

== See also ==
- Eques (disambiguation)
