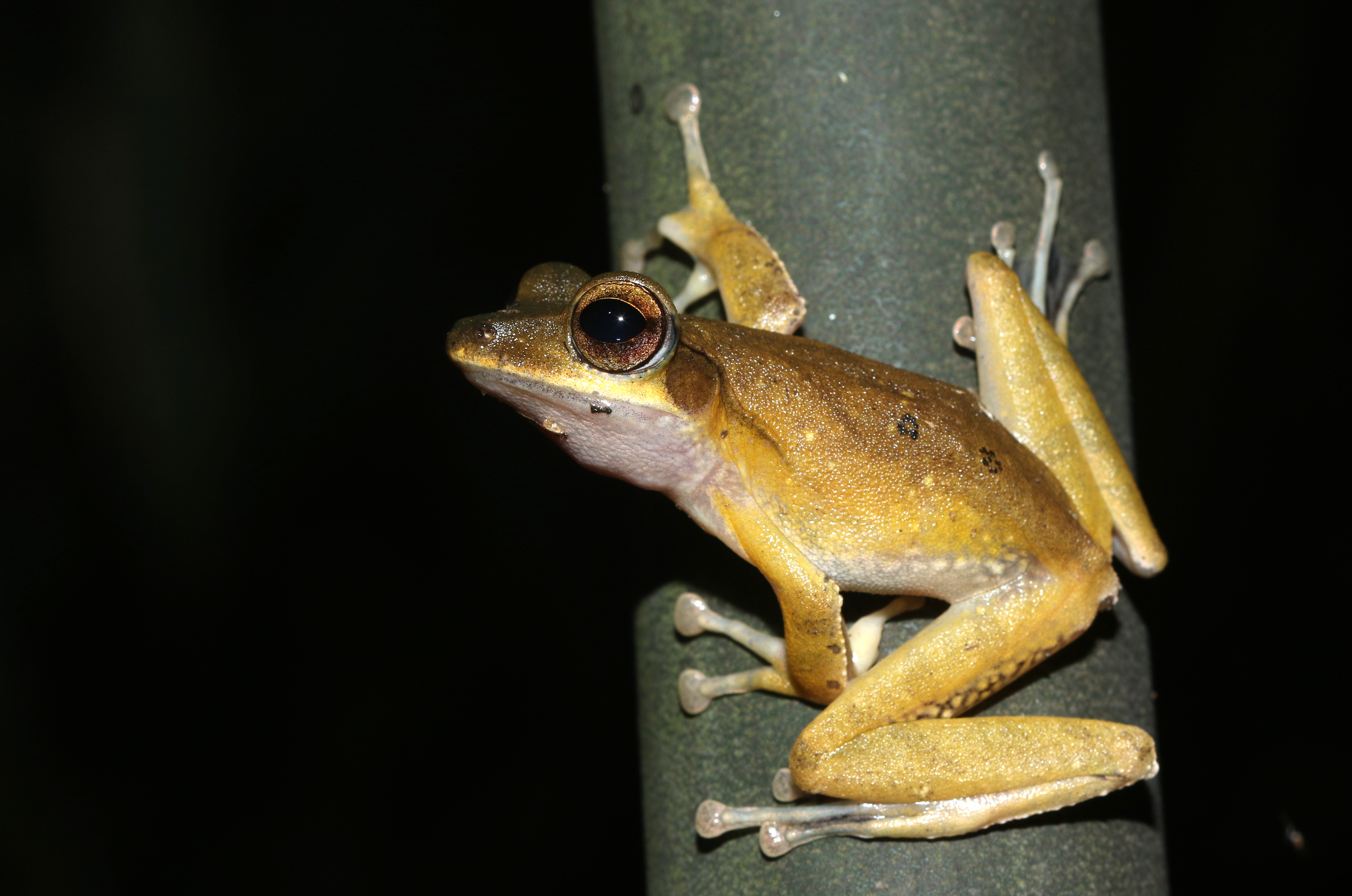

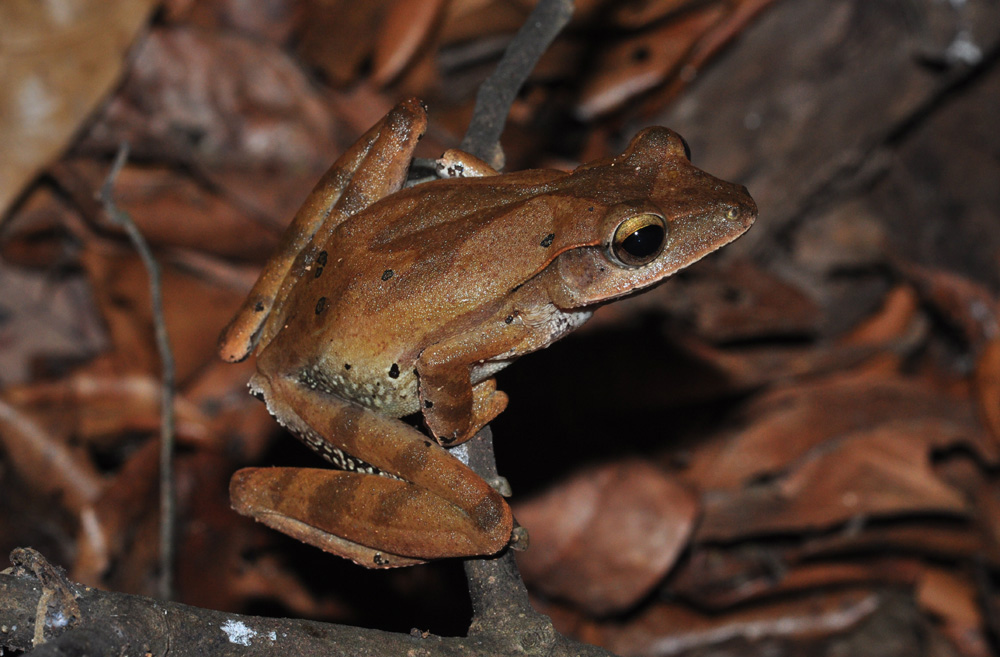

Conservation status
- Least Concern (IUCN 3.1)

Scientific classification
- Kingdom: Animalia
- Phylum: Chordata
- Class: Amphibia
- Order: Anura
- Family: Rhacophoridae
- Genus: Polypedates
- Species: P. occidentalis

Binomial name
- Polypedates occidentalis Das & Dutta, 2006

= Western tree frog =

Species of amphibian

The western tree frog, Charpa tree frog, or Nagercoil whipping frog (Polypedates occidentalis) is a species of frog in the family Rhacophoridae endemic to India. It has been observed between 100 and 1100 meters above sea level in the Parambikulam Tiger Reserve and Charpa Forest Range, both of which are in Kerala.

== Description ==
This tree frog is characterized in having an obtusely pointed snout, a large tympanum, a prominent fold from the back of the eye to the shoulder, and an hourglass pattern on the dorsum terminating in the shape of a trident; in breeding season, the male possesses nuptial pads on first and second fingers.

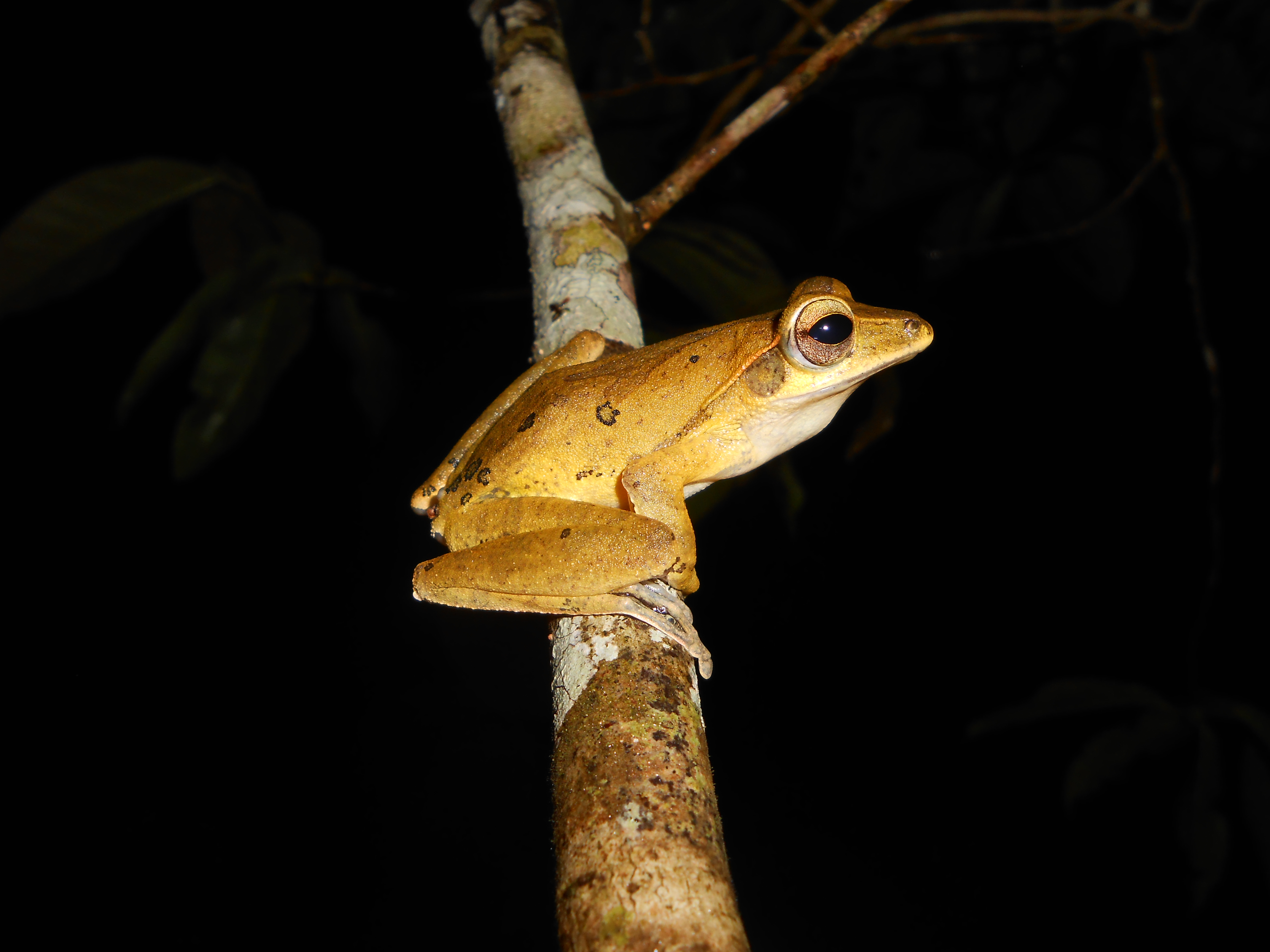
Western tree frog.

This frog is closely related to Polypedates cruciger from Sri Lanka and P. pseudocruciger from Western Ghats. However, it is diagnosed by the following characters, apart from the ones listed above. Adult male size is up to 55.1 mm, the vomerine teeth are set obliquely between the choanae, the fingers have rudimentary webbing, no dermal fold is found along the forearm, the webbing on toe III reaches the disks at tips of the digits, conical lingual papillae are absent, the skin of forehead is free, the snout lacks a dermal flap, and the heel lacks a cutaneous spur.

== Ecology and natural history ==
This species is usually seen on shrubs and understory in evergreen, semievergreen, and moist deciduous forests up to 1200 m above sea level. They are commonly seen near water bodies during the breeding season.
