= Terai frog =

Terai frog may refer to:

- Terai cricket frog, a frog associated with open grasslands
- Terai tree frog, a whipping frog
