= Long-snouted treefrog =

Long-snouted treefrog may refer to:

- Kurixalus naso, a frog in the family Rhacophoridae found in northeastern India, Tibet, and Myanmar
- Taruga longinasus a frog in the family Rhacophoridae endemic to Sri Lanka
