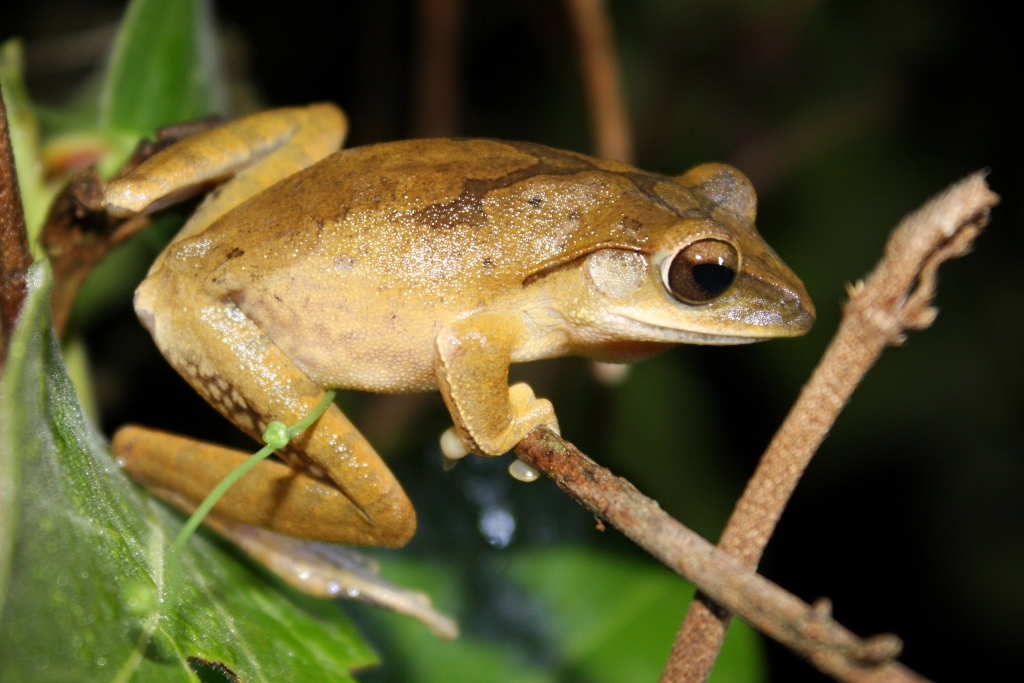
- Adult at Wu Kau Tang Country Trail (New Territories, Hong Kong)

Conservation status
- Least Concern (IUCN 3.1)

Scientific classification
- Kingdom: Animalia
- Phylum: Chordata
- Class: Amphibia
- Order: Anura
- Family: Rhacophoridae
- Genus: Polypedates
- Species: P. megacephalus

Binomial name
- Polypedates megacephalus Hallowell, 1861

Synonyms
- Polypedates maculatus var. unicolor Müller, 1878; Rana scutigera Andersson, 1916; Hylarana scutigera Bourret, 1942; Hylarana scutigera Chen et al., 2005; Chalcorana scutigera Fei, Ye, and Jiang, 2010

= Polypedates megacephalus =

Species of amphibian

Polypedates megacephalus, the Hong Kong whipping frog or spot-legged tree frog, is a species in the shrub frog family (Rhacophoridae). In its native range, it is also called "brown tree frog", but this name is otherwise applied to a species of the true tree frog family (Hylidae).

== Distribution and ecology ==
This species is native in central, southern and southwestern China (including Hong Kong and Hainan) and Indo-China peninsula. It is closely related to Polypedates leucomystax and was formerly included in P. leucomystex species complex, along with P. mutus and P. braueri.

Previously, P. megacephalus was thought to distribute above the Red River of Vietnam and in Northeast India, while P. leucomystex was generally found south of the Red River and in western Yunnan. However, recent genetic studies revealed that the natural barriers between these species are the Isthmus of Kra and the Tenasserim Range, where P. megacephalus can be found above the isthmus and east of the range.

This frog is listed as Least Concern in view of its wide distribution in Asia and its tolerance of a broad range of habitats. It also because of its presumed large population.

== Taxonomy ==
This species is easily confused with other members of the Polypedates leucomystax complex, and genetic sequencing is often the only way to differentiate member species.

P. megacephalus was formerly synonymous with P. leucomystax, and the history of the geographic and taxonomic placement of these species, along with Polypedates braueri, is highly variable.

In 2020, the former Chalcorana [Rana] scutigera was demonstrated to be synonymous with P. megacephalus. This validated an earlier opinion by Edward Taylor who suggested R. scutigera's synonymy with P. leucomystax (then Rhacophorous leucomystax).

== Images ==
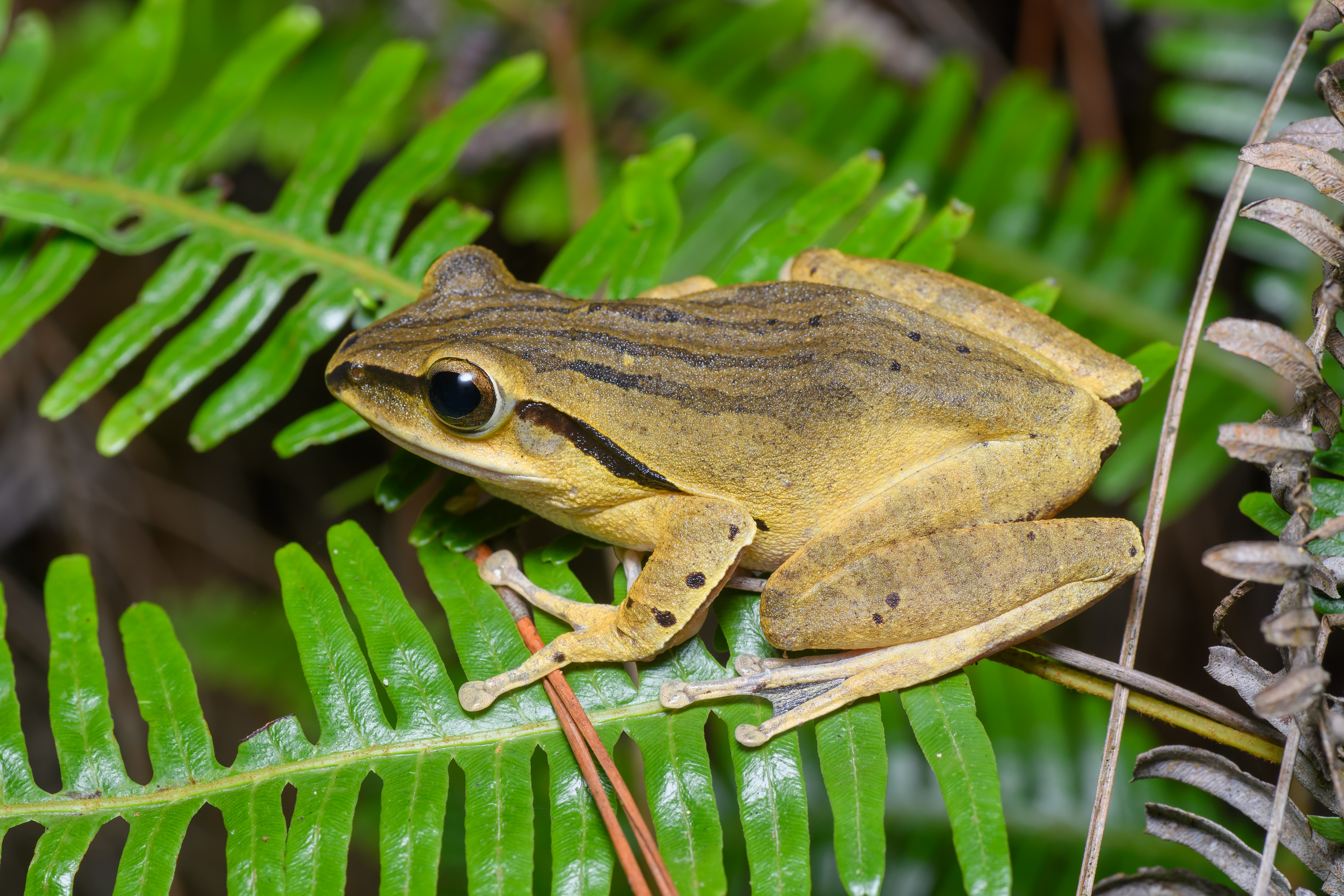
Polypedates megacephalus, Spot-legged tree frog - Phu Kradueng National Park

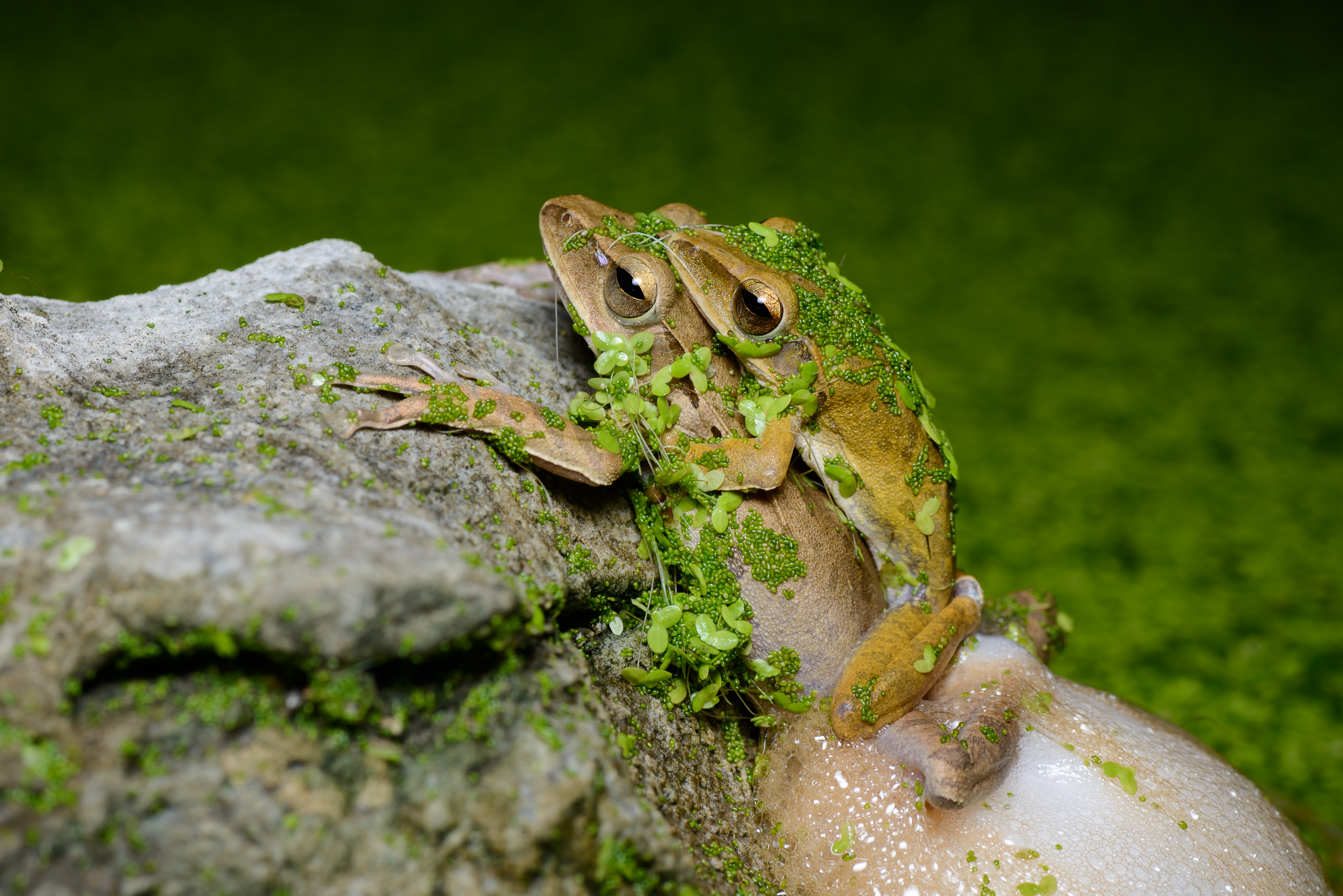
Mating

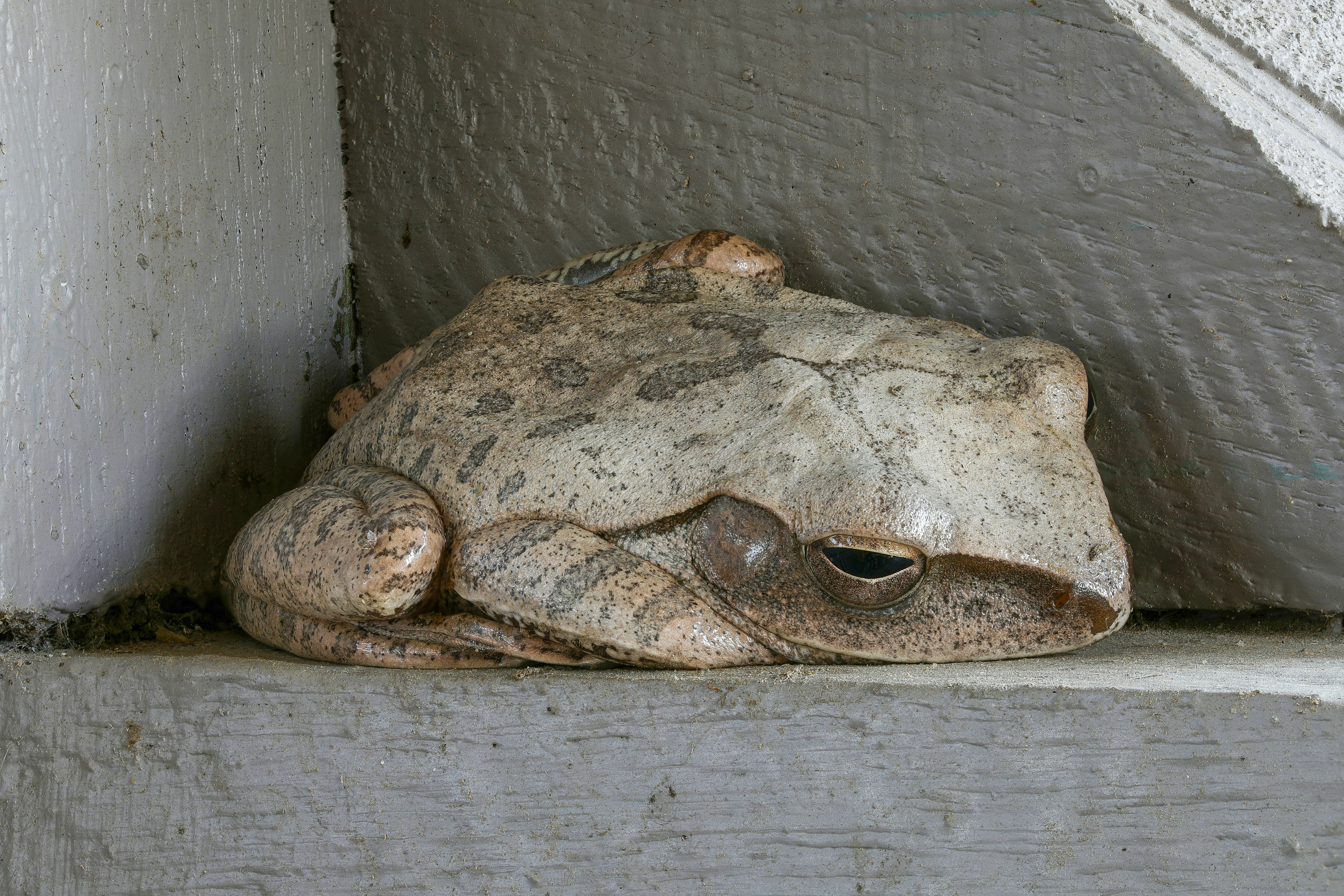
Resting
