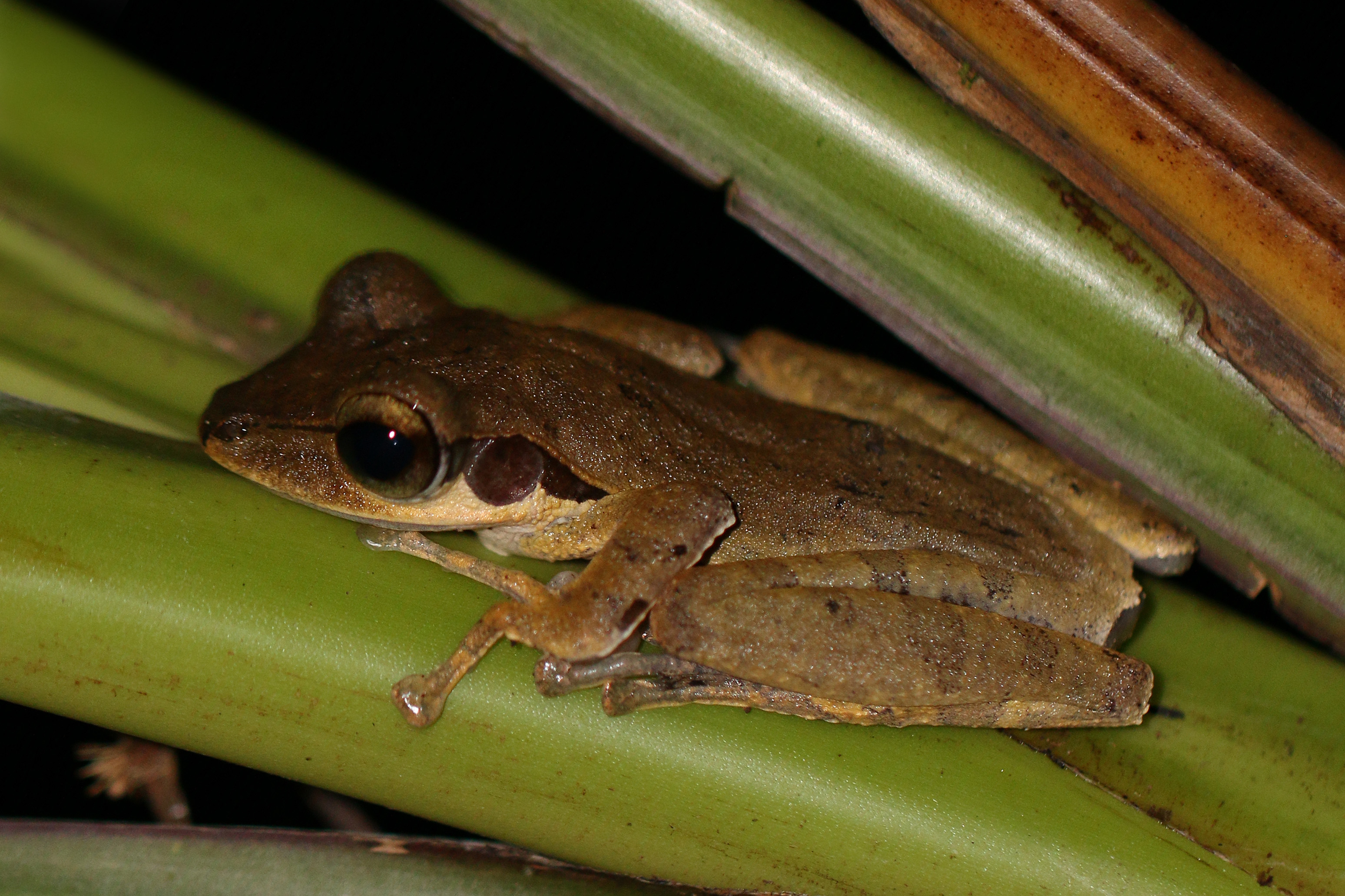
- at Danum Valley Conservation Area, Sabah, Malaysia

Conservation status
- Least Concern (IUCN 3.1)

Scientific classification
- Kingdom: Animalia
- Phylum: Chordata
- Class: Amphibia
- Order: Anura
- Family: Rhacophoridae
- Genus: Polypedates
- Species: P. macrotis

Binomial name
- Polypedates macrotis (Boulenger, 1891)

Synonyms
- Rhacophorus macrotis Boulenger, 1891; Philautus montanus Taylor, 1920; Polypedates linki Taylor, 1922

= Polypedates macrotis =

Species of amphibian

Polypedates macrotis, commonly known as the dark-eared treefrog, as well as the Bongao tree frog, Bongao bubble-nest frog, Baram whipping frog, or brown-striped tree frog, is a species of tree frog (a "true" frog) in the family Rhacophoridae. This species is found on the Malay Peninsula and Southern Thailand, Sumatra and Java (Indonesia), Borneo (including Brunei) and parts of the Philippines, in addition to several smaller islands within the Coral Triangle ecoregion.

Bongao, from the common name "Bongao tree frog", is in reference to Bongao Island, the type locality of Philautus montanus—now synonymized with Polypedates macrotis. Additionally, "Baram whipping frog" is referencing Baram, a district in Sarawak, East Malaysia (Borneo), and is also the name of the type locality of P. macrotis.

== Description ==
Male Polypedates macrotis grow to a snout–vent length of about 60 mm (2.4 in) and females to 85 mm (3.3 in). Tadpoles are up to 60 mm (2.4 in) in length. Dorsum is brown with a darker band behind the eye that covers the tympanum, tapering along the side.

Polypedates macrotis is similar to Polypedates leucomystax but differs from it slightly in colouration and body proportions.

== Reproduction ==
Polypedates macrotis deposit their eggs in foam nests attached to leaves or twigs overhanging standing water, such as ponds and ditches.

== Habitat and distribution ==
The dark-eared tree frog is a locally-abundant species within its range. It is found in Thailand (Nakhon Si Thammarat, Narathiwat, Pattani, Songkhla), Malaysia (Johor, Kelantan, Kuala Lumpur, Negeri Sembilan, Pahang, Penang, Putrajaya, Sabah, Sarawak, Selangor), Indonesia (Aceh, Bangka Belitung, Jambi, Lampung, North Sumatra, Riau, South Sumatra, West Java, West Sumatra), Brunei, the Sulu Archipelago and various western Philippine islands (Palawan, Busuanga, Calauit, Jolo, and Dumaran), where it inhabits primary forests and forest-edge areas. In addition to living in and around human settlements, including some large cities and towns, adult frogs can be found near small streams, ponds, or even puddles and small pools, swamps and wet rainforests with dripping or trickling sources of water. They may also frequent the captured rainwater that has filled the inside of certain epiphytic plants, ferns, etc.

== Gallery ==
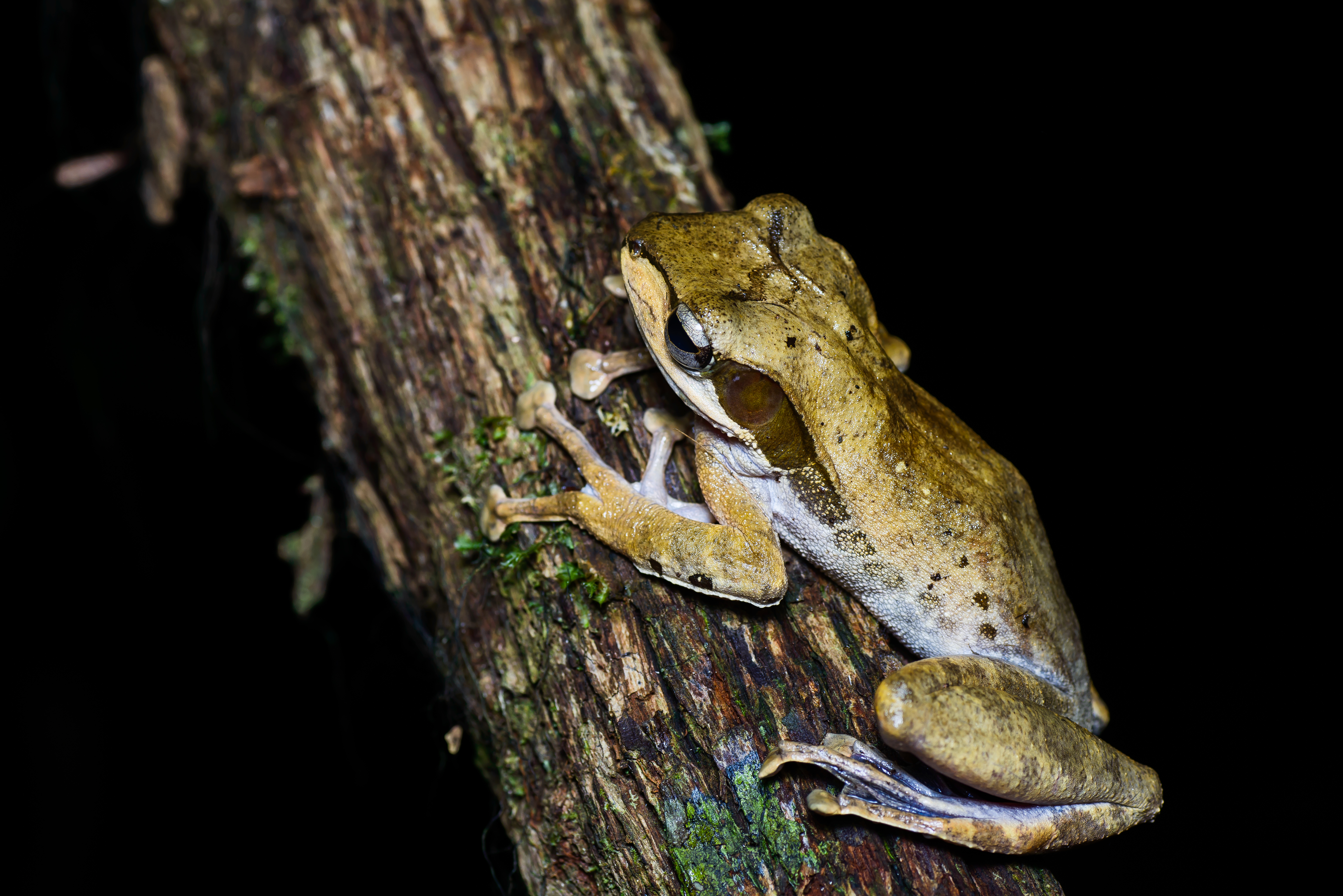
Polypedates macrotis - Khao Luang National Park
