= Polypedates hecticus =

Conservation status
- Data Deficient (IUCN 3.1)

Scientific classification
- Kingdom: Animalia
- Phylum: Chordata
- Class: Amphibia
- Order: Anura
- Family: Rhacophoridae
- Genus: Polypedates
- Species: P. hecticus

Binomial name
- Polypedates hecticus Peters, 1863

Species of frog

Polypedates hecticus is a species of frog in the family Rhacophoridae. It is endemic to Samar, Philippines.

Scientists think this might be the same species as Polypedates leucomystax.
