= Polypedates iskandari =

Conservation status
- Least Concern (IUCN 3.1)

Scientific classification
- Kingdom: Animalia
- Phylum: Chordata
- Class: Amphibia
- Order: Anura
- Family: Rhacophoridae
- Genus: Polypedates
- Species: P. iskandari

Binomial name
- Polypedates iskandari Riyanto, Mumpuni, and McGuire, 2011

Species of amphibian

Polypedates iskandari is a species of frogs in the family Rhacophoridae. It is endemic to Sulawesi, Indonesia. It belongs to the Polypedates leucomystax species complex; it was split from Polypedates leucomystax in 2011 based on a morphometric analysis. This split has been challenged because male vocalizations between specimens from Sulawesi and Java show only minor differences and because genetic differences (as shown by Brown and colleagues) are low.

== Etymology ==
The specific name iskandari honours Djoko Iskandar, an Indonesian zoologist and herpetologist.

== Description ==
The holotype is an adult male measuring 44.5 mm (1.8 in) in snout–vent length. The head is elongated and moderately wide, about as wide as the body. The tympanum and the supra-tympanic fold are distinct. Fingers bear truncate or spatulate discs. The toes are webbed.

Polypedates iskandari have lighter coloration than Polypedates leucomystax and show only faintly visible dorsal stripes.

== Habitat ==
The holotype was collected at 1,008 m (3,307 ft) above sea level; the original species description contains no other ecological information. Two calling males were recorded in a swamp area at 391 m (1,283 ft) above sea level. It has been observed as high as 1008 meters above sea level.
