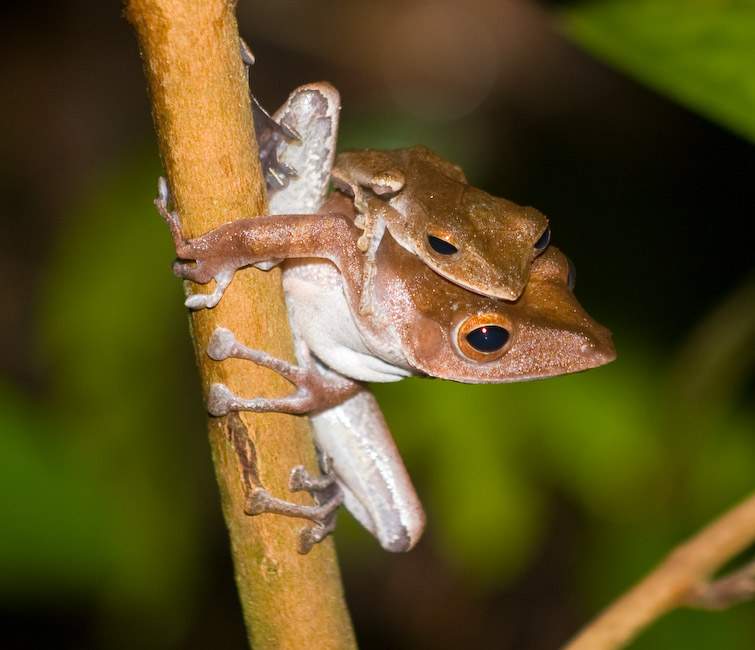
- Female and male (top) in amplexus

Conservation status
- Least Concern (IUCN 3.1)

Scientific classification
- Kingdom: Animalia
- Phylum: Chordata
- Class: Amphibia
- Order: Anura
- Family: Rhacophoridae
- Genus: Polypedates
- Species: P. colletti

Binomial name
- Polypedates colletti (Boulenger, 1890)

Synonyms
- Rhacophorus colletti Boulenger, 1890

= Polypedates colletti =

Species of frog

Polypedates colletti (Collett's tree frog, Collett's treefrog, Collett's whipping frog or black-spotted tree frog) is a species of frog in the family Rhacophoridae. It is found in the Malay Peninsula (Thailand and Malaysia), southern Vietnam, Borneo, Sumatra, and islands of the South China Sea (including Natuna Islands).

== Etymology ==
The specific name colletti honours Robert Collett, Norwegian zoologist.

== Description ==
Males can reach 52 mm (2.0 in) and females 80 mm (3.1 in) in snout–vent length. The snout is conspicuously acute. The tympanum is distinct. The dorsum is usually brownish or grayish, and most individuals have an hour-glass pattern in their back. The belly is whitish-cream. The throat may have dark vermiculations. The limbs have darkish cross-bars.

The tadpoles grow to 33 mm (1.3 in) in total length and have a marbled pattern on head, trunk, and tail.

== Habitat and conservation ==
Polypedates colletti inhabits lowland marshy evergreen rainforest areas, including mildly disturbed, selectively logged forest, at elevations up to 600 m (2,000 ft) above sea level. During the breeding, it forms aggregations around temporary rain pools; adults perch at 1–2 m (3–7 ft) height in the vegetation. It is potentially threatened by habitat loss. It is found in a number of protected areas.
