= Polypedates impresus =

Conservation status
- Data Deficient (IUCN 3.1)

Scientific classification
- Kingdom: Animalia
- Phylum: Chordata
- Class: Amphibia
- Order: Anura
- Family: Rhacophoridae
- Genus: Polypedates
- Species: P. impresus

Binomial name
- Polypedates impresus Yang, 2008

Species of amphibian

Polypedates impresus is a species of frogs in the family Rhacophoridae. It is endemic to Yunnan, China, where it has been recorded in Pu'er. It is known from Yunnan (Puer, Lüchun, and Xishuangbanna) and Guangxi (Jingxi County). People have seen it between 600 and 1000 meters above sea level.

This frog lives in thick hill grass in riparian habitats.

Scientists classify this frog as in least concern of extinction because of its large range and presumed large population.
