= Polypedates zed =

Conservation status
- Data Deficient (IUCN 3.1)

Scientific classification
- Kingdom: Animalia
- Phylum: Chordata
- Class: Amphibia
- Order: Anura
- Family: Rhacophoridae
- Genus: Polypedates
- Species: P. zed

Binomial name
- Polypedates zed (Dubois, 1986)

Species of frog

Polypedates zed is a species of frog in the family Rhacophoridae. It is found in Nepal and possibly India. Its natural habitats are forests in the hills of the Himalayas. It has been observed between 100 and 300 meters above sea level.
