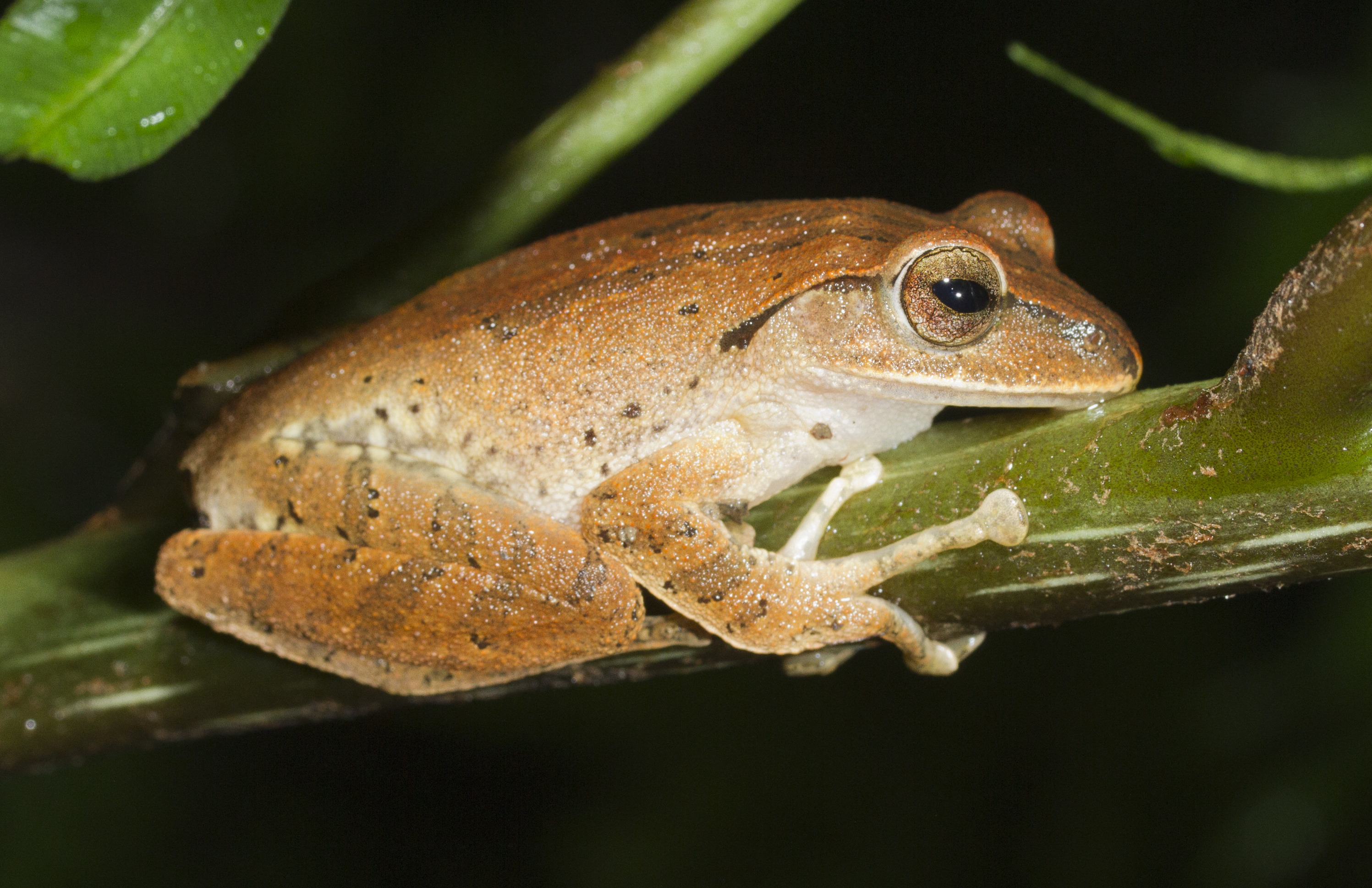

Conservation status
- Least Concern (IUCN 3.1)

Scientific classification
- Kingdom: Animalia
- Phylum: Chordata
- Class: Amphibia
- Order: Anura
- Family: Rhacophoridae
- Genus: Polypedates
- Species: P. braueri

Binomial name
- Polypedates braueri Vogt, 1911

= Polypedates braueri =

Species of frog

Polypedates braueri is a species of frog in the family Rhacophoridae. It's native range includes tropical and subtropical China, Taiwan, and large parts of Southeast Asia. It has also been introduced to Guam. It has been observed between 0 and 2200 meters above sea level.

This frog has been found forests, bamboo groves, and orchards. The female frog builds a foam on a plant overhanging a pool of water and lays 400–500 eggs at a time. When the eggs hatch, the tadpoles fall into the water below. These frogs can lay eggs over many types of water, but they seem to prefer dense vegetation and shallow water.

Scientists do not consider this frog in danger of extinction because of its large range and presumed large population. The local population in Taiwan may be threatened by competition with Polypedates megacephalus, which humans introduced.
