= Polypedates taeniatus =

Conservation status
- Least Concern (IUCN 3.1)

Scientific classification
- Kingdom: Animalia
- Phylum: Chordata
- Class: Amphibia
- Order: Anura
- Family: Rhacophoridae
- Genus: Polypedates
- Species: P. taeniatus

Binomial name
- Polypedates taeniatus (Boulenger, 1906)

Synonyms
- Rhacophorus taeniatus Boulenger, 1906

Species of frog

Polypedates taeniatus is a species of frog in the family Rhacophoridae. It is found in the Bengal region of Bangladesh and India as well as in Assam and southern Nepal. It is also known as the Bengal whipping frog, Bengal whipping tree frog, and Terai tree frog.

The species' natural habitats are tropical forests and shrublands at elevations to 500 m (1,600 ft) above sea level. It is an arboreal species. The eggs are deposited in branches overhanging small pools. Upon hatching, the tadpoles drop into the pools. It is generally a common species, but habitat loss through deforestation is a threat to it. It is reported from the Orang National Park in India.
