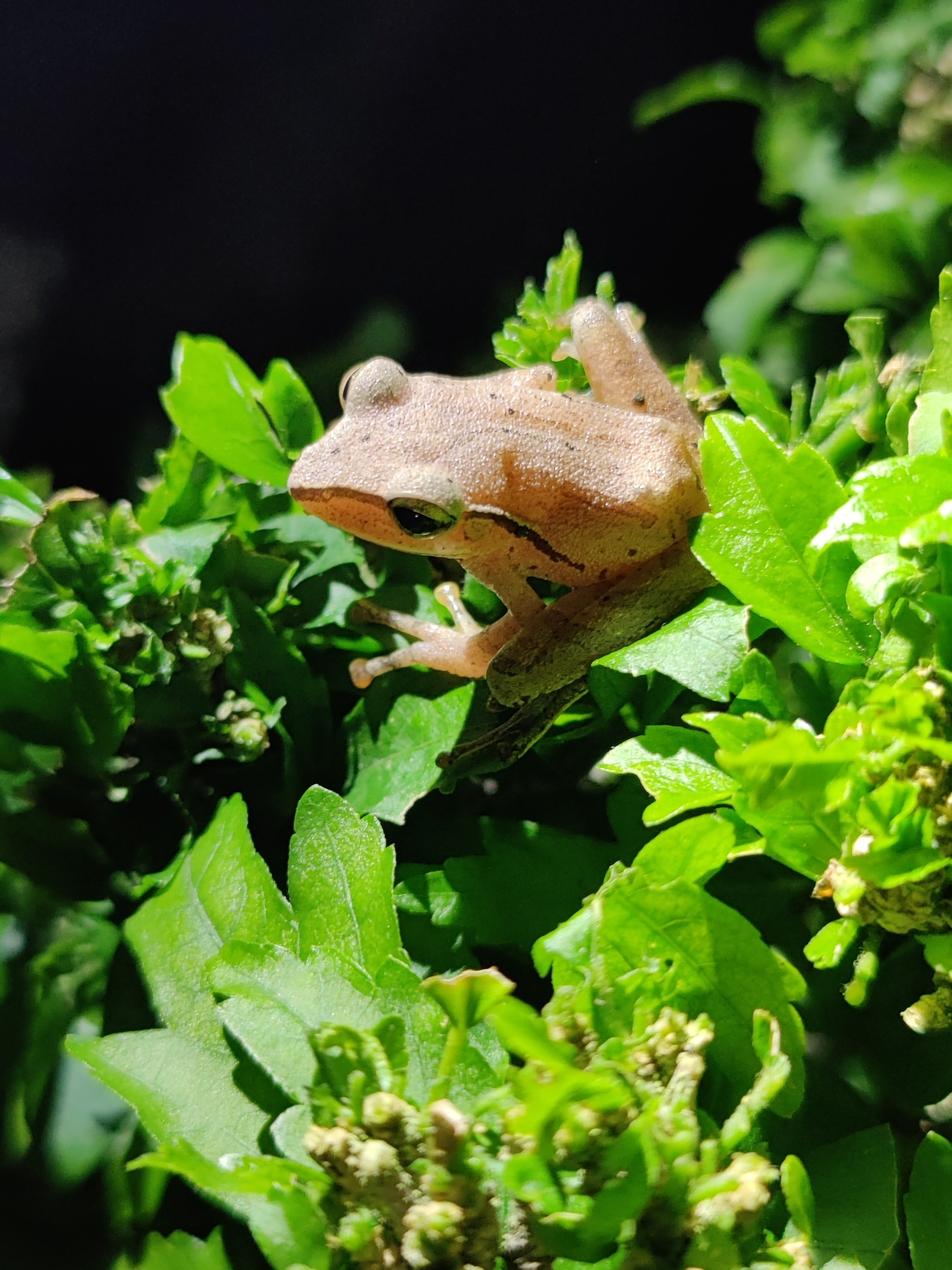

Conservation status
- Data Deficient (IUCN 3.1)

Scientific classification
- Kingdom: Animalia
- Phylum: Chordata
- Class: Amphibia
- Order: Anura
- Family: Rhacophoridae
- Genus: Polypedates
- Species: P. subansiriensis

Binomial name
- Polypedates subansiriensis Mathew and Sen, 2009
- Polypedates subansiriensis is only known from the Lower Subansiri District in northeastern India

= Polypedates subansiriensis =

Species of amphibian

Polypedates subansiriensis is a species of frogs in the family Rhacophoridae. It is endemic to Northeast India and only known from its type locality, Soro village in the eponymous Lower Subansiri District, Arunachal Pradesh state. It is sometimes known as the Subansiri's tree frog or Subansiri tree frog.

== Description ==
Polypedates subansiriensis was described based on a single specimen (holotype, sex unspecified), which measures 56 mm (2.2 in) in snout–vent length. The head is depressed and broader than it is long. The tympanum is depressed and the supratympanic fold is prominent. The fingers have no webbing whereas the toes are about three-quarters webbed. Skin is dorsally minutely granular and ventrally broadly granular. The dorsum has indistinct brownish-yellow spots. The upper lip has a white bordering line. A broad, smooth, darker band runs from the eye to the nostril, with granular skin beneath it. A black streak runs from the nostril to the shoulder. The hands and tarsi have white, slightly raised dermal fringes. The thighs have yellow spots.

== Habitat and conservation ==
Polypedates subansiriensis is an arboreal species. The type locality is at 1,550 m (5,090 ft) above sea level. Scientists classify this species as "data deficient" with respect to conservation and extinction.
