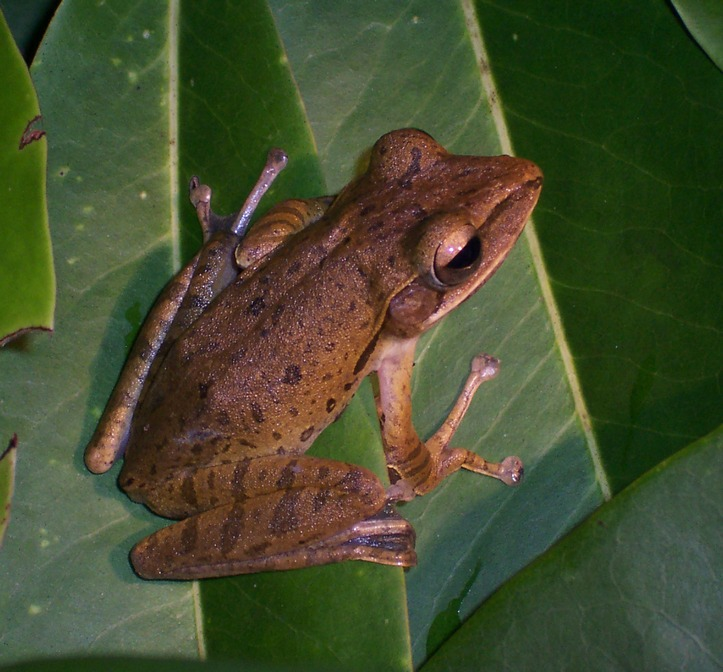
- Polypedates leucomystax

Scientific classification
- Kingdom: Animalia
- Phylum: Chordata
- Class: Amphibia
- Order: Anura
- Family: Rhacophoridae
- Subfamily: Rhacophorinae
- Genus: Polypedates; Tschudi, 1838

Type species
- Hyla leucomystax Gravenhorst, 1829

Diversity
- 26 species (see text)

= Polypedates =

Genus of amphibians

Polypedates is a genus of frogs in the family Rhacophoridae, the shrub frogs and Paleotropic tree frogs. They belong to subfamily Rhacophorinae. Members of this genus are collectively known as whipping frogs. They occur in eastern and southern Asia.

The delimitation of Polypedates versus the related Rhacophorus has been difficult. In former times, the present genus was often entirely included in Rhacophorus. However, molecular phylogenetic studies support the recognition of both genera. Polypedates + Taruga are considered to be the sister taxon of Feihyla + Rhacophorus.

== Species ==
The following species are recognised in the genus Polypedates, with new species still being described on a regular basis:

- Polypedates assamensis Mathew & Sen, 2009
- Polypedates bengalensis Purkayastha et al., 2019
- Polypedates braueri (Vogt, 1911) – White-lipped treefrog or Java treefrog
- Polypedates colletti (Boulenger, 1890) – Collett's whipping frog, black-spotted tree frog, or Collett's tree frog
- Polypedates cruciger Blyth, 1852 – Sri Lanka whipping frog or common hour-glass tree-frog
- Polypedates discantus Rujirawan, Stuart, and Aowphol, 2013 – Malayan slender treefrog
- Polypedates hecticus Peters, 1863 – Samara flying frog
- Polypedates himalayensis (Annandale, 1912) – Himalayan tree frog
- Polypedates impresus Yang, 2008
- Polypedates insularis Das, 2005 – Nicobarese tree frog
- Polypedates iskandari Riyanto, Mumpuni & McGuire, 2011
- Polypedates leucomystax (Gravenhorst, 1829) – common tree frog, four-lined tree frog, striped tree frog, "white-lipped tree frog" (formerly often in P. maculatus)
- Polypedates macrotis (Boulenger, 1891) – Bongao tree frog
- Polypedates maculatus (Gray, 1830) – common Indian tree frog, Chunam tree frog
- Polypedates megacephalus Hallowell, 1861 – spot-legged tree frog, Hong Kong whipping frog, "brown tree frog"
- Polypedates mutus (Smith, 1940) – northern treefrog
- Polypedates occidentalis Das and Dutta, 2006 – western tree frog
- Polypedates otilophus (Boulenger, 1893) – file-eared tree frog, Borneo eared frog
- Polypedates pseudocruciger Das and Ravichandran, 1998 – false hour-glass tree frog or yellow tree frog
- Polypedates pseudotilophus Matsui, Hamidy, and Kuraishi, 2014
- Polypedates ranwellai Wickramasingha, Munindradasa, and Fernando, 2012 – Ranwella's spined tree frog
- Polypedates subansiriensis Mathew & Sen, 2009 – Subansiri's tree frog
- Polypedates taeniatus (Boulenger, 1906) – Bengal whipping frog, Bengal whipping tree frog, or Terai tree frog
- Polypedates teraiensis (Dubois, 1987) – common tree frog, six-lined tree frog, Terai tree frog, or Perching frog
- Polypedates zed (Dubois, 1987) – Nepalese tree frog or Narayanghat whipping frog

The recently described Polypedates bijui has now been renamed as Beddomixalus bijui, the only species in its genus.

== Phylogeny ==
The following phylogeny of Polypedates is from Pyron & Wiens (2011). 8 species are included. Polypedates is a sister group of Feihyla. Together, Polypedates and Feihyla form a sister group to Rhacophorus.

- Polypedates
  - - Polypedates eques
    - Polypedates fastigo
  - - Polypedates colletti
    - - - Polypedates maculatus
        - Polypedates cruciger
      - - Polypedates leucomystax
        - - Polypedates mutus
          - Polypedates megacephalus

Kuraishi, et al. (2013) gives the following phylogeny of Polypedates. Polypedates and Rhacophorus are estimated to have split off from their most recent common ancestor 26.6 million years ago during the Oligocene. Furthermore, the genus Taruga has been separated as a separate genus endemic to Sri Lanka.

- Polypedates
  - Taruga
    - Taruga eques
    - Taruga fastigo
    - Taruga longinasus
  - - Polypedates otilophus (Borneo)
    - - Polypedates colletti (Southeast Asian)
      - - (South Asian clade)
          - Polypedates maculatus
          - Polypedates cruciger
        - - Polypedates sp. (Malay clade)
          - - Polypedates macrotis (Sunda)
            - - Polypedates cf. mutus sp. 1 (South China clade)
              - - Polypedates braueri (North China clade)
                - - Polypedates impresus (Laos clade)
                  - - Polypedates leucomystax (Sunda clade)
                    - Polypedates megacephalus (Indochina clade)
