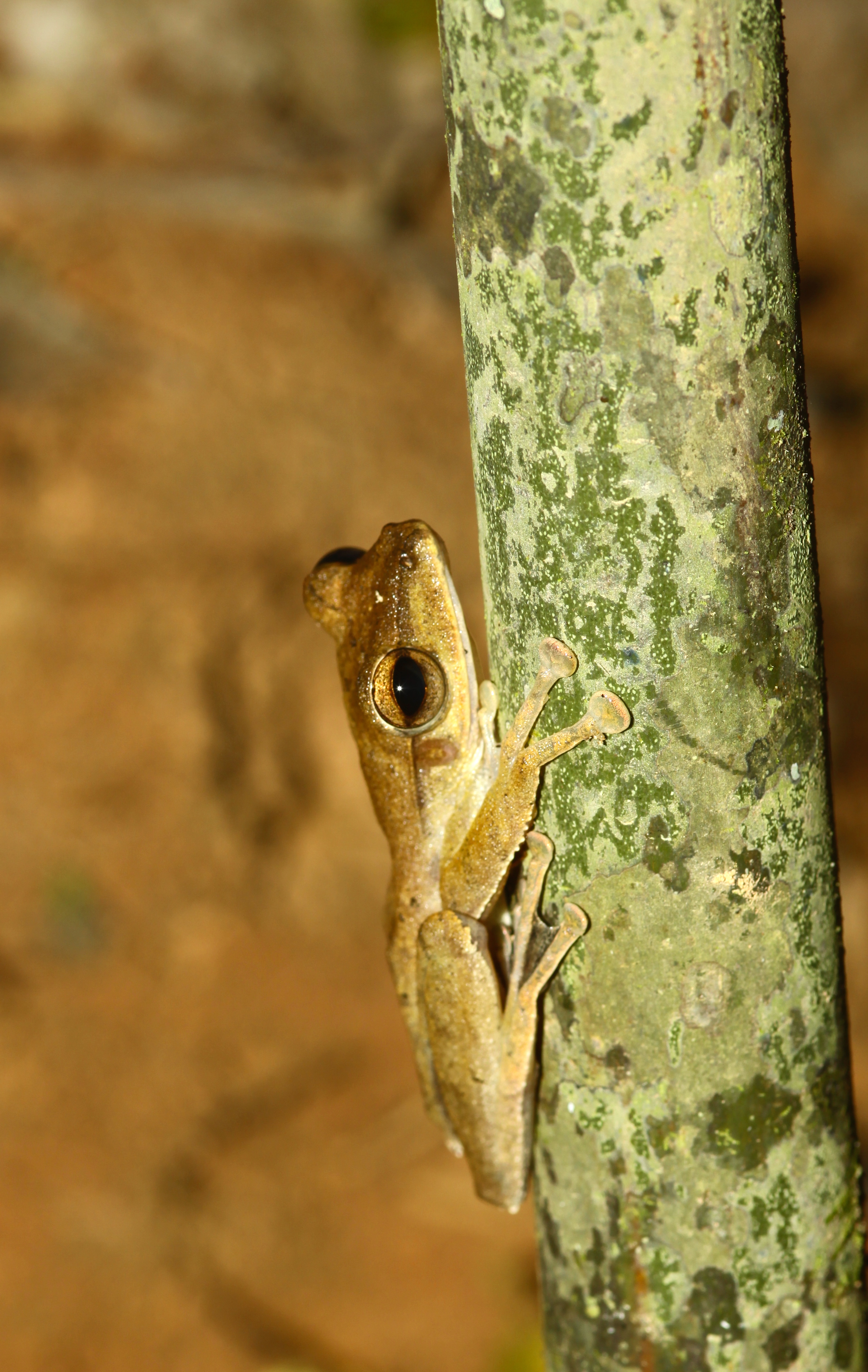

Conservation status
- Least Concern (IUCN 3.1)

Scientific classification
- Kingdom: Animalia
- Phylum: Chordata
- Class: Amphibia
- Order: Anura
- Family: Rhacophoridae
- Genus: Polypedates
- Species: P. discantus

Binomial name
- Polypedates discantus Rujirawan, Stuart, and Aowphol, 2013

= Polypedates discantus =

Species of frog

Polypedates discantus, the Malayan slender tree frog or Malayan whipping frog, is a species of frog in the family Rhacophoridae. It is endemic to Thailand and Malaysia, where it has been observed between 61 and 206 meters above sea level.

This frog's living and reproductive habits are not entirely clear, but it has been observed in dense grasses near temporary ponds and perched on vegetation .3 to 1.5 meters above those ponds. Scientists believe the female frog may lay eggs on these plants such that the tadpoles fall into the water, as other frogs in Polypedates do.

The adult frog's skin is not co-ossified to the skull. The adult male frog makes four different advertisement calls.

Scientists classify this frog as at least concern of dying out because, but they acknowledge deforestation for the purpose of palm oil plantations as a threat.

There are some records of this frog being sold as a pet or for human consumption, but given that it has been considered conspecific with Polypedates leucomystax, it is not clear whether the frogs sold were P. leucomystax or P. discantus.
