= Polypedates ranwellai =

Ranwella's spined tree frog

Conservation status
- Endangered (IUCN 3.1)

Scientific classification
- Kingdom: Animalia
- Phylum: Chordata
- Class: Amphibia
- Order: Anura
- Family: Rhacophoridae
- Genus: Polypedates
- Species: P. ranwellai

Binomial name
- Polypedates ranwellai Wickramasinghe, Munindradasa, and Fernando, 2012

Species of amphibian

Polypedates ranwellai, also known as the Ranwella's spined tree frog, Ranwella's horned tree frog, or Ranwella's tree frog, is a species of frogs in the family Rhacophoridae. It is endemic to Sri Lanka and only known from its type locality, Gilimale forest near Ratnapura, the Sabaragamuwa Province.

== Etymology ==
The specific name ranwellai honours Sanjeewa Ranwella for his contributions towards conserving the Gilimale forest reserve.

== Description ==
Adult males measure 41–49 mm (1.6–1.9 in) and females, based on one measured specimen, 65 mm (2.6 in) in snout–vent length. The body is elongated and the head long. The snout is truncate in dorsal aspect and rounded in lateral and ventral aspects. There are four dorsal spines. The canthus rostralis is rounded. The tympanum is distinct. The fingers are basally webbed while the toes are half-webbed. The body colour is variable, from white to green, with yellow more frequent. There are very small, scattered black spots on the body. The throat, vocal sacs, chest and belly are all white. They can also change their colour to brown, providing them camouflage on the forest floor.

Polypedates ranwellai is only known from its type locality, Gilimale forest in the Sabaragamuwa Province, Sri Lanka.

== Reproduction ==
After heavy rains, males congregate in areas with small, temporary water holes. Males have three types of advertisement calls: a long, pulsated, duck-like "qua", a short pulsed note, and a short "tok" note; the latter two are emitted when other calling males are present.

A pair in axillary amplexus has been recorded on a branch 1.5 m above the ground. The pair moved down to the ground and after a still period, the female started burrow into the leaf litter. However, at this point the pair was disturbed by a shrew, and could not be relocated. It remains unknown whether the species is a foam nester or a direct developer.

== Habitat and conservation ==
The type locality is a lowland rainforest at 150 m (490 ft) above sea level. Polypedates ranwellai were typically found near forest edges with open canopy, and were more seldom, in closed-canopy forest. Some frogs were observed on the forest floor but most were perched on branches of trees and shrubs 1–10 m above the ground. They are only active during the periods of heavy rain.

The type locality is a forest reserve. Habitat loss and fragmentation are major threats in the area, and also occur in the reserve. Paving the road entering the reserve has led to increased visitations and associated problems. The planned damming of the Kalu river would completely wipe out the known population.
