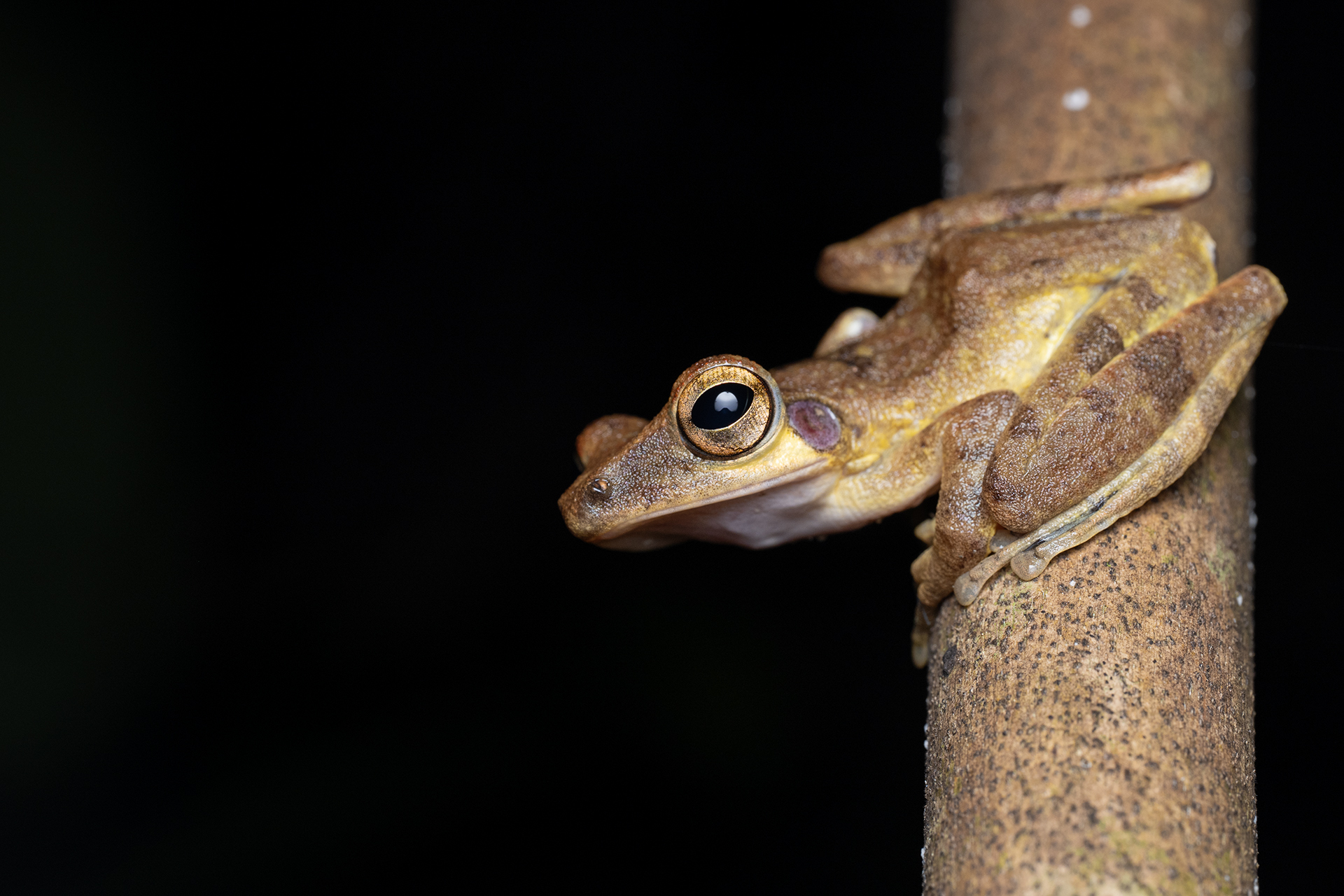

Conservation status
- Near Threatened (IUCN 3.1)

Scientific classification
- Kingdom: Animalia
- Phylum: Chordata
- Class: Amphibia
- Order: Anura
- Family: Rhacophoridae
- Genus: Polypedates
- Species: P. insularis

Binomial name
- Polypedates insularis Das, 1995

= Polypedates insularis =

Nicobarese tree frog

Species of amphibian

Polypedates insularis (Nicobarese tree frog) is a species of frog in the family Rhacophoridae. It is endemic to India's Nicobar Islands: Great Nicobar, Little Nicobar, Pulo Milo, and others. It has been observed as high as 500 meters above sea level.

This arboreal frog has been found in forests and on shrubs, but it can also live in gardens, farms, and houses.

Scientists classify this frog as near threatened because of its limited range. There are plans for a port on Great Nicobar, and the IUCN Red List published an intent to change the frog's classification if those plans are carried out.
