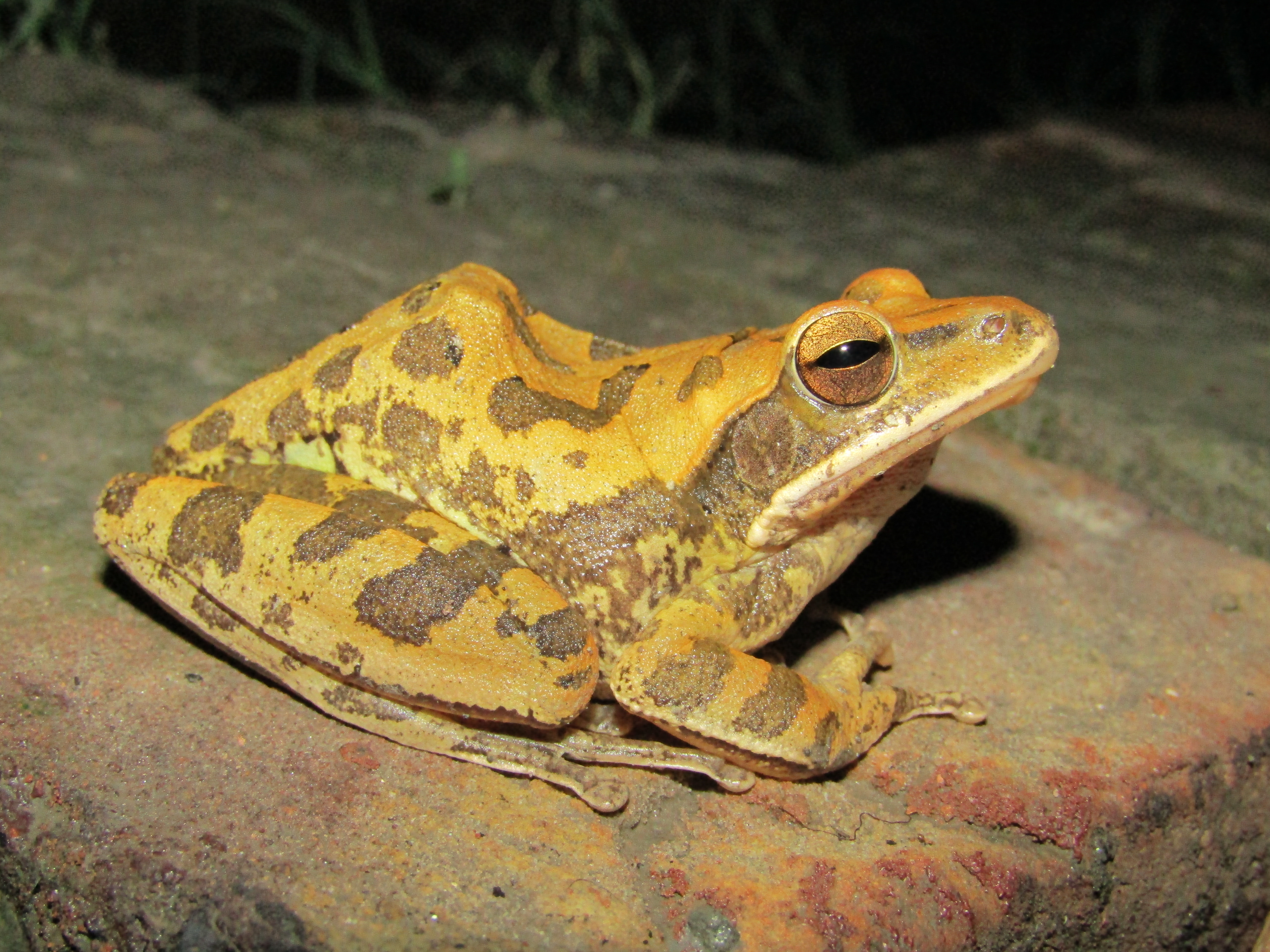

Conservation status
- Data Deficient (IUCN 3.1)

Scientific classification
- Kingdom: Animalia
- Phylum: Chordata
- Class: Amphibia
- Order: Anura
- Family: Rhacophoridae
- Genus: Polypedates
- Species: P. bengalensis

Binomial name
- Polypedates bengalensis Purkayastha, Das, Mondal, Mitra, Chaudhuri & Das, 2019

= Polypedates bengalensis =

Species of frog

Polypedates bengalensis, the brown blotched Bengal tree frog, is a species of frog in the family Rhacophoridae. It is endemic to West Bengal, India. It has been observed between 7 and 13 meters above sea level.

== Etymology ==
The specific name, bengalensis, is a reference to the type locality of the species located in the state of West Bengal, India.

== Distribution ==
The species, native to eastern India, was first described from Khordanahala, South 24 Parganas and Badu, North 24 Parganas in West Bengal. A while after the species was recorded, it was also reported in Odisha, India and southwestern Bangladesh.

== Description ==
The frog is mid-sized; males are 4.8–5.4 cm in length, and females about 7.2 cm. It is yellowish-brown to greenish-brown in colour. Its body is marked by a series of six to nine dark brown blotches. Its digits lack webbing. There is no dermal fold on forearm. The males possess paired vocal sacs.
