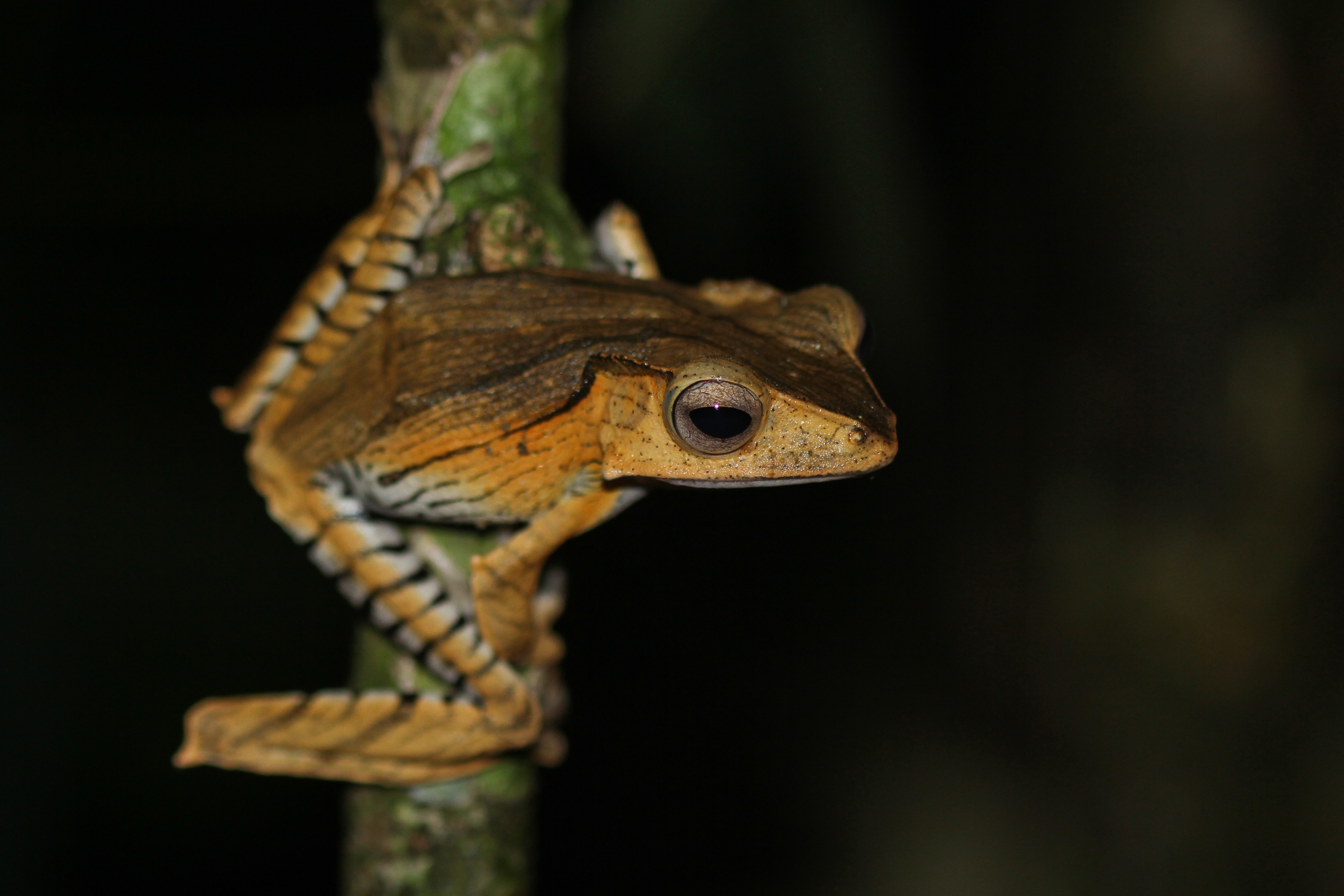
- A specimen from Kubah National Park, Sarawak.

Conservation status
- Least Concern (IUCN 3.1)

Scientific classification
- Kingdom: Animalia
- Phylum: Chordata
- Class: Amphibia
- Order: Anura
- Family: Rhacophoridae
- Genus: Polypedates
- Species: P. otilophus

Binomial name
- Polypedates otilophus (Boulenger, 1893)

Synonyms
- Rhacophorus otilophus Boulenger, 1893

= Polypedates otilophus =

Species of amphibian

Polypedates otilophus (also known as the file-eared tree frog, Borneo eared frog, or bony-headed flying frog) is a species of frog in the family Rhacophoridae. It is endemic to Borneo where it is widespread and found in Brunei, Indonesia, and Malaysia, typically in the lowlands but sometimes as high as 1,100 m (3,600 ft) above sea level. This species has prominent, sharp ridges behind the eye, above the ear, referred to in its names.

== Taxonomy ==
Polypedates pseudotilophus from Sumatra and (probably) Java was included in this species until 2014.

== Description ==
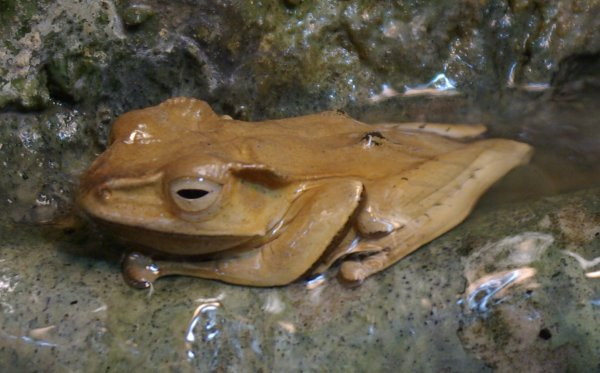
Adult exhibited at National Geographic Museum (Washington DC, USA)

Males measure up to 80 mm (3.1 in) and females up to 100 mm (3.9 in) in snout–vent length. The body is robust and dorsally lemon yellow in color, with many thin, black stripes; also the thighs have many black bars. The tympanum is conspicuous, with a serrated bony crest above it (the "ear"). Fingertips are expanded into large discs; those on the toes are smaller. The fingers have only rudimentary webbing whereas the toes are moderately webbed. The tadpoles are yellowish green above and white below, acquiring the stripes seen in adults well before metamorphosis. The largest tadpoles are 60 mm (2.4 in) in total length.

== Habitat and conservation ==
Polypedates otilophus typically occurs in secondary habitats, at the edges of primary forest, and also in villages. They are most easily spotted at suitable breeding ponds where adults perch on vegetation 1–4 m above the ground. It is not considered a threatened species by the IUCN.
