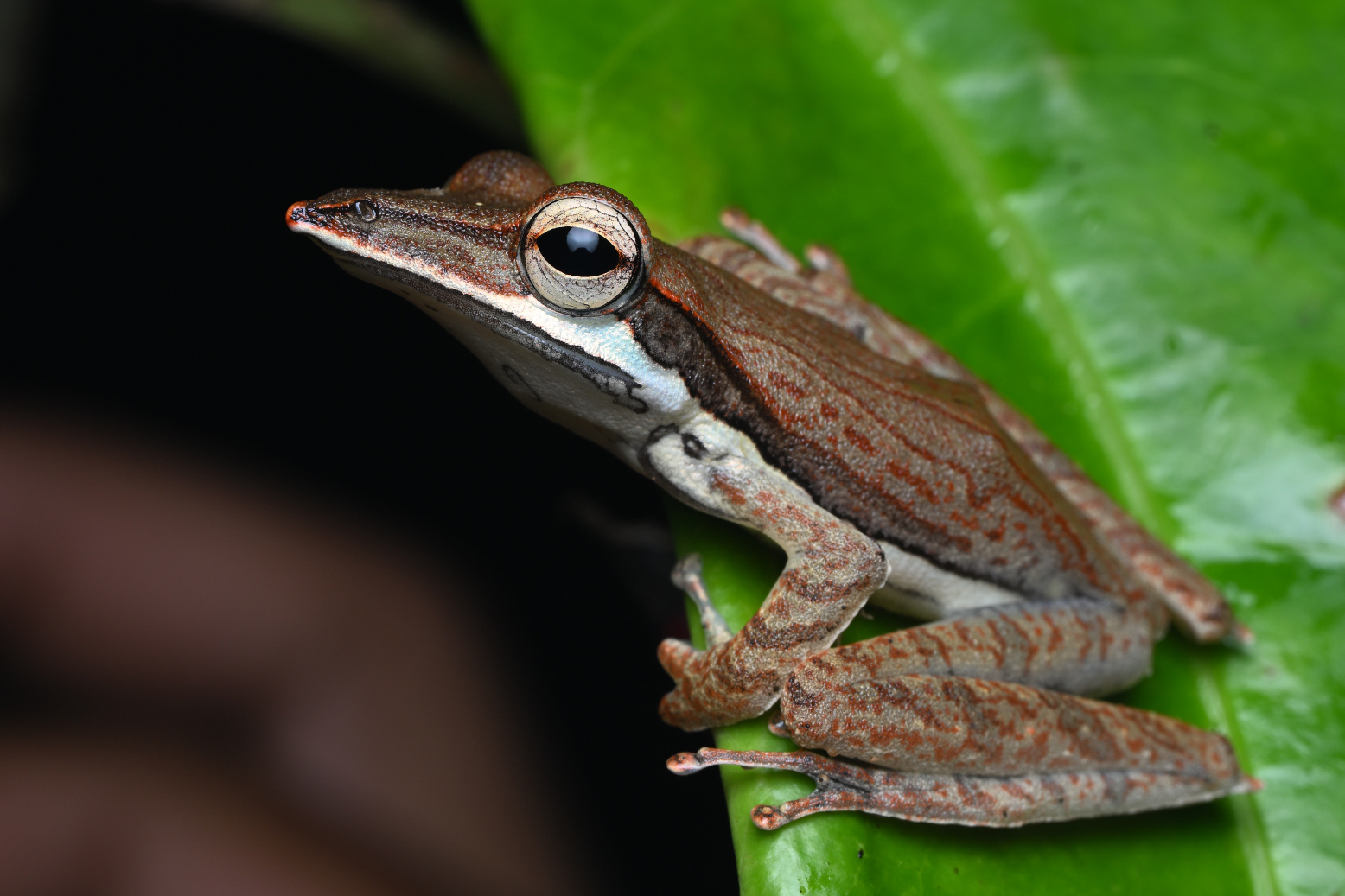
- Adult Taruga longinasus

Scientific classification
- Domain: Eukaryota
- Kingdom: Animalia
- Phylum: Chordata
- Class: Amphibia
- Order: Anura
- Family: Rhacophoridae
- Subfamily: Rhacophorinae
- Genus: Taruga; Meegaskumbura, 2010

Species
- 3 species

= Taruga (frog) =

Genus of amphibians

Taruga is a genus of frogs endemic to Sri Lanka. They are the only foam-nesting tree frogs in the Old World Tree frog family, Rhacophoridae.

Genus Taruga was previously assigned to the genus Polypedates. As presently understood, Taruga comprises three named species: T. fastigo, T. eques and T. longinasus. Hence two genera of foam-nesting rhacophorid tree frogs are present in Sri Lanka: (1) Polypedates, with many species in India and Asia but just two in Sri Lanka (P. maculatus— widely distributed in South Asia; and P. cruciger— endemic to Sri Lanka, albeit widely distributed); and (2) Taruga, the Sri Lankan endemic forms, whose three constituent species (T. eques, T. fastigo and T. longinasus) each have restricted distributions mostly in the forested highlands. The best character to distinguish the adults of Taruga from Polypedates are a set of prominent cone-like projections around the vent. Furthermore, the supratympanic fold of Taruga is straighter than those in Polypedates. The snout of Taruga is very much acute than that of Polypedates.

Considering tadpoles, the vent of Polypedates forms a tube between left leg and tail, and in Taruga, there is no such tube, only an opening between leg and tail. There are also several more features of the mouth cavity, such as the number of projections on the tongue, shape of the tongue etc. that helps to distinguish Taruga from Polypedates.

Taruga in Sanskrit (and early-Sinhala) means "tree climber". This name is very appropriate as the adults of these are tree inhabiting frogs, and rarely come to the ground. They often even lay their eggs on vegetation overhanging water.

All three frogs need shade in the form of a canopy to survive, and shallow and slow flowing streams or puddles to breed.

The female of the species builds a foamy nest overhanging water where eggs develop for a few days, after which tadpoles fall into water where they undergo further development until metamorphosis occurs. The juvenile frogs that emerge from water return to an arboreal life, on trees.

Sri Lanka is now known to contain clade level endemicity despite many land-bridge connections with India. Taruga is yet another such deeply divergent clade.

Following scientists contributed to this paper: Dr. Madhava Meegaskumbura (Dept. of Zoology, University of Peradeniya, Sri Lanka); Dr. Suyama Meegaskumbura (Dept. of Zoology, University of Peradeniya), Mr. Gayan Bowatte (Dept. of Zoology, University of Peradeniya), Prof. Christopher J. Schneider (Boston University, USA) and Prof. James Hanken (Harvard University, USA).

== Species ==
There are three recognized species in this genus:

- Taruga eques (Günther, 1858)
- Taruga fastigo (Manamendra-Arachchi & Pethiyagoda, 2001)
- Taruga longinasus (Ahl, 1927)
