= Polypedates assamensis =

Conservation status
- Least Concern (IUCN 3.1)

Scientific classification
- Kingdom: Animalia
- Phylum: Chordata
- Class: Amphibia
- Order: Anura
- Family: Rhacophoridae
- Genus: Polypedates
- Species: P. assamensis

Binomial name
- Polypedates assamensis Mathew & Sen, 2009

Species of amphibian

Polypedates assamensis is a species of frog in the family Rhacophoridae. It is endemic to Dhemaji District, Assam, India. It has been observed between 100 and 585 meters above sea level, exclusively in forests. It has been found on shrubs near pools, in which the larvae develop.

This frog is classified as at least concern of extinction because of its large range.
