= Eques =

Eques, horseman or rider in Latin, may refer to:

- Equites, a member of the Roman Equestrian order
- the Latin word for a knight in chess
- Eques, a small genus of fishes in the drum family Sciaenidae
