= Polypedates pseudotilophus =

Conservation status
- Least Concern (IUCN 3.1)

Scientific classification
- Kingdom: Animalia
- Phylum: Chordata
- Class: Amphibia
- Order: Anura
- Family: Rhacophoridae
- Genus: Polypedates
- Species: P. pseudotilophus

Binomial name
- Polypedates pseudotilophus Matsui, Hamidy & Kuraishi, 2014

Species of amphibian

Polypedates pseudotilophus is a species of frogs in the family Rhacophoridae. It is endemic to Sumatra and Java in Indonesia, where it has been observed between 0 and 1000 meters above sea level.

This frog lives in and near forests. It has been observed on coffee plantations but only those near forests. Scientists infer that the frog requires forest habitat. There is some sale of this frog in the pet trade, though the IUCN recommends that the Indonesian government set a quota of 700 frogs per annum.

Scientists classify this frog as least concern of extinction because of its large range, presumed large population, and ability to live in disturbed habitats.
