= Polypedates teraiensis =

Perching Frog

Scientific classification
- Kingdom: Animalia
- Phylum: Chordata
- Class: Amphibia
- Order: Anura
- Family: Rhacophoridae
- Genus: Polypedates
- Species: P. teraiensis

Binomial name
- Polypedates teraiensis (Dubois, 1987)

Synonyms
- Rhacophorus (Rhacophorus) leucomystax teraiensis; Rhacophorus teraiensis

Species of amphibian

Polypedates teraiensis, also known as perching frog, six-lined tree frog, or Terai tree frog is a species of frog in the family Rhacophoridae. It is found in eastern Nepal; eastern, peninsular, and north-eastern India (West Bengal, Meghalaya, Assam, Arunachal Pradesh, Nagaland, Manipur, Sikkim, also reported for Gujarat and Madhya Pradesh) and Bangladesh, into adjacent Myanmar, and possibly into adjacent China. People have seen it between 40 and 1800 meters above sea level.

In northeastern India, Polypedates teraiensis begins breeding after the first few rains of the rainy season (approximately March) and produces foam nests normally attached to vegetation above shallow temporary still water but can also be found on logs or walls of human habitation. Embryos hatch at stage 20, but stay within the nest until dropping from the nest into the water at stage 22. Full development of larvae from ovum fertilization to the emergence of froglet lasts 58 days.

Relating to breeding, the testes of perching frogs are found to appear from hibernation as temperatures increased and day lengths increased. Testes weight was found to increase as time these frogs received illumination increased, otherwise known as increased photoperiods.

Erythrocytes in this species were found to be larger during tadpole life when compared to the erythrocyte size of adults. This was perceived to be a change due to evolution for a more reliable cardiovascular system as they developed to become terrestrial adults.
