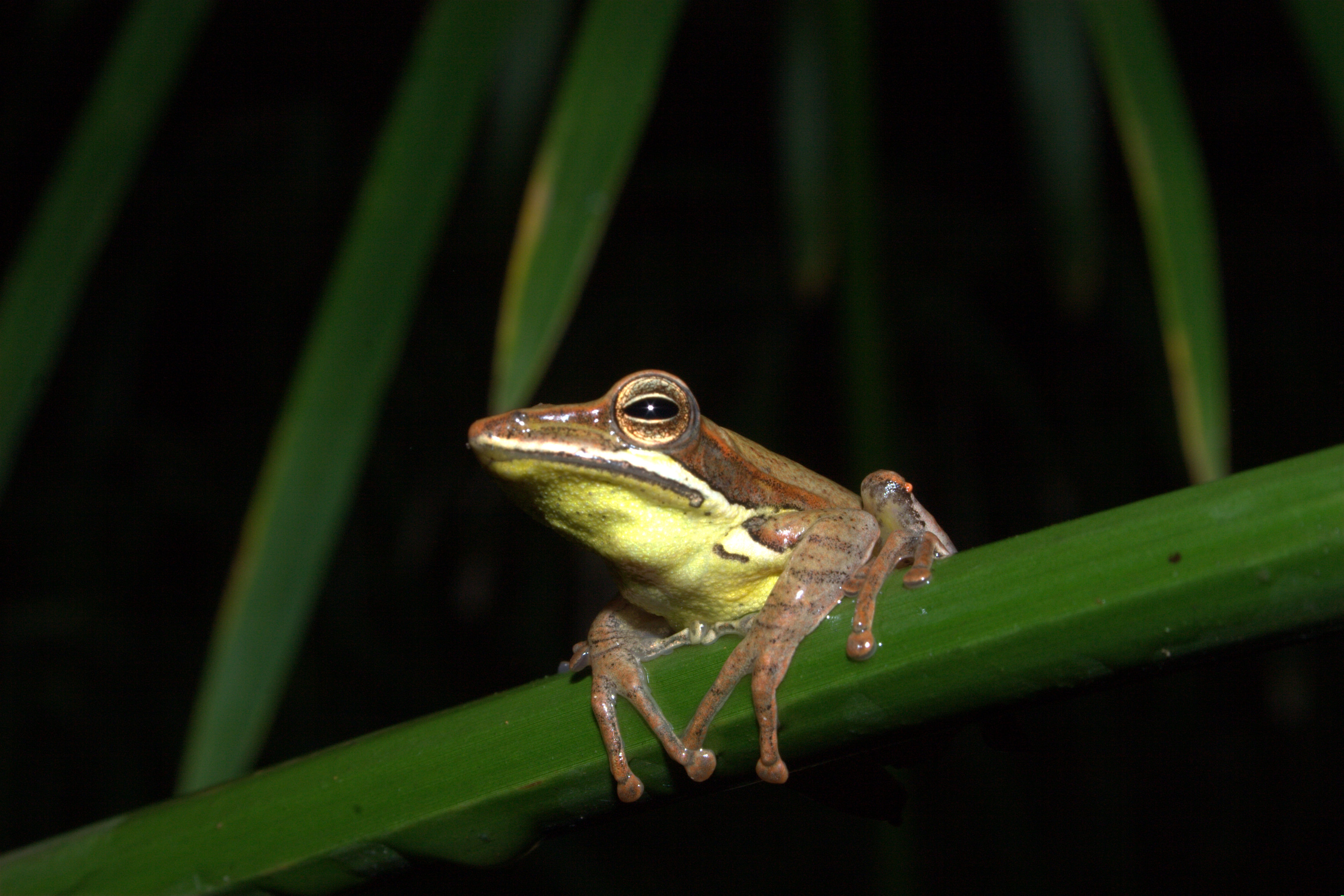

Conservation status
- Endangered (IUCN 3.1)

Scientific classification
- Kingdom: Animalia
- Phylum: Chordata
- Class: Amphibia
- Order: Anura
- Family: Rhacophoridae
- Genus: Taruga
- Species: T. eques

Binomial name
- Taruga eques (Günther, 1858)

Synonyms
- Polypedates eques Günther, 1858; Rhacophorus eques (Günther, 1858); Rhacophorus cruciger eques (Günther, 1858)

= Taruga eques =

Species of amphibian

Taruga eques (common names: Günther's whipping frog, Spurred Tree-frog, Montane Hour-glass Tree-frog) is a species of tree frog in the family Rhacophoridae. It is endemic to the central hills of Sri Lanka.

== Taxonomy ==
Taruga eques is a species of tree frog in the Rhacophoridae family, commonly known as shrub or flying frogs. The species was first described in 1858 by Albert Günther, who named the species Polypedates eques. In 1882, George Albert Boulenger described the species as Rhacophorus eques. Ernst Ahl upheld this classification in 1931 when he described the species as Rhacophorus (Rhacophorus) eques. In 1957, Kirtisinghe reclassified the species as Rhacophorus cruciger eques, and in 1992, the species was renamed again to Polypedates eques by Kelum Manamendra-Arachchi and Sushil Kumar Dutta. In 2010, the Taruga genus was established by a team led by Madhava Meegaskumbura, resulting in the species being renamed to Taruga eques. This reclassification was upheld in 2024 with the name Polypedates (Taruga) eques. The species is known colloquially as the Spurred Tree-frog, Gunther's Whipping Frog, and the Montane Hour-glass Tree-frog.

=== Evolution ===
The genus Taruga is considered a sister genus to Polypedates. Divergence between these genus likely occurred in the Sundaland region (possibly India) before Polypedates dispersed in a northerly fashion. The following cladogram shows the phylogenetic position of Taruga eques among select members of the Rhacophoridae family, based upon Bayesian inference and maximum likelihood comparison of mitochondrial and nuclear DNA:

- Rhacophoridae
  - - - - Taruga equis
        - T. fastigo
      - - - P. otilophus
          - Other Polypedates species

== Description ==
Taruga eques is a large frog. Adult males measure 33–43 mm (1.3–1.7 in) and females 59–71 mm (2.3–2.8 in) in snout–vent length. Their snout is long, sharp, and triangular; females' snouts are a red-orange while males tend to be brown. The underside of the snout is a grey to cream-yellow color. The back pattern can vary from an hourglass shape to brown spots. The hind legs have dark stripes.

Taruga eques resembles (and has been confused with) Taruga fastigo but Taruga eques has relatively shorter legs and has a narrower but longer head. Additionally, unlike Taruga fastigo they lack a black line that connects the axilla to the groin in, or, in some cases, that line is reduced to a band of blackish dots. Taruga eques can be differentiated from other Polypedates species by the presence of a calcar on the heel.

=== Polymorphism ===
Taruga eques demonstrates polymorphic color differences between specimen. Males can present as brown, dark brown, and grey while females are red, orange, yellow orange, and red.

== Ecology and behavior ==
Juncus effusus and other herbs are often used as shelter to prevent desiccation of the frogs during the daytime. In the mid afternoon, Taruga eques will often begin emerging and vocalize until approximately midnight when observed. Taruga eques prefers humid environments greater than 65% and temperatures under 16 °C. They likewise prefer still bodies of water less than 16.5 °C. The species is predated by the Indian Pond Heron, Indian Black Bird, Mongooses, dragonfly larvae and the Eurasian Otter. Cestodes and leeches parasitize the species. Taruga eques is sympatric with Fejevarya greenii, Pseudophilautus microtampanioum, Pseudophilautus alto, and other species of the Pseudophilautus genus.

=== Mating ===
Taruga eques is a terrestrial foam-nesting frog. Mating begins when males perform mating calls to attract females. The mating pair will climb shrubbery or trees overhanging bodies of water. In particular, the flowering plant Juncus effusus is highly favored as a nesting site. The female secretes a mucus into the tree or shrub that she will kick with her hind legs until it forms a thick, white foam, and the male simultaneously fertilizes the eggs. Following this, the female will deposit the eggs into the resulting foam nest. Nest size varies from 12 to 195 cm2, and is largely dependent on environmental factors. The average nest is built 15.24 centimetres (6.00 in) above the water; with a maximum height of 200 centimetres (79 in) having been observed. Nest construction is designed such that tadpoles emerge and drop into the water below, but does not occur closer than 15 centimeters due to the risk of nest inundation by season rains. The outermost layer of the foam nest dries quickly after being laid to provide additional protection.

== Habitat and conservation ==
Taruga eques inhabits montane tropical moist forests in the central hills of Sri Lanka at elevations of 1,200–2,135 m (3,937–7,005 ft) above sea level. It is both arboreal and terrestrial, being found in canopies and on tree trunks as well as in grasses at the edge of ponds. It is present in the Horton Plains National Park, Hakgala Strict Nature Reserve, Knuckles Mountain Forest Reserve, and the Peak Wilderness Sanctuary. The tadpoles are often found in both permanent and seasonal ponds.

While it is commonly found in Sri Lanka, it is classified as endangered by the IUCN due to habitat loss. It does not occur in habitats that have been modified by human action, showing that the species many not be able to tolerate human impacts to its environment. Knuckles Mountain Forest Reserve, a known habitat for the species, has recently been threatened by tea and cardamom plantations, unregulated construction, tourism, man-made forest fires, and invasive species. Decreases in rainfall due to climate change, subcutaneous parasitic infections, and forest dieback have also been identified as possible threats to the species. The species' reliance on micro habitats made of Juncus efficus and ecological specialization are seen as existential risk factors for the species.

== Gallery ==
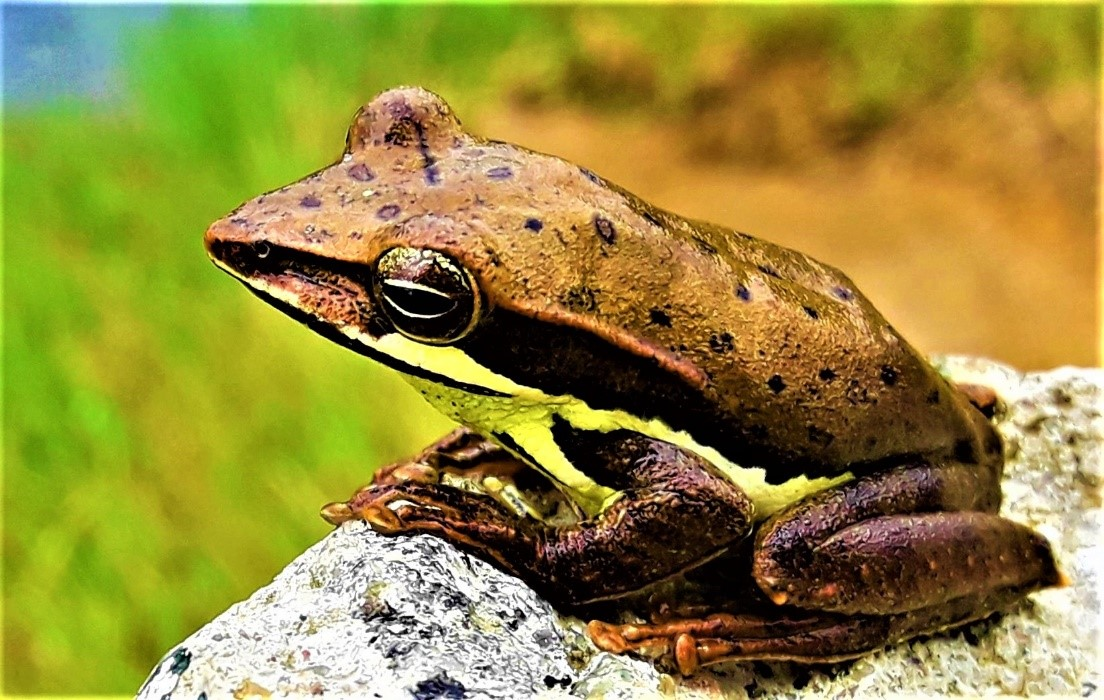
adult stage with "dorsal spots" pigment pattern found in world heritage Horton Plains National Park

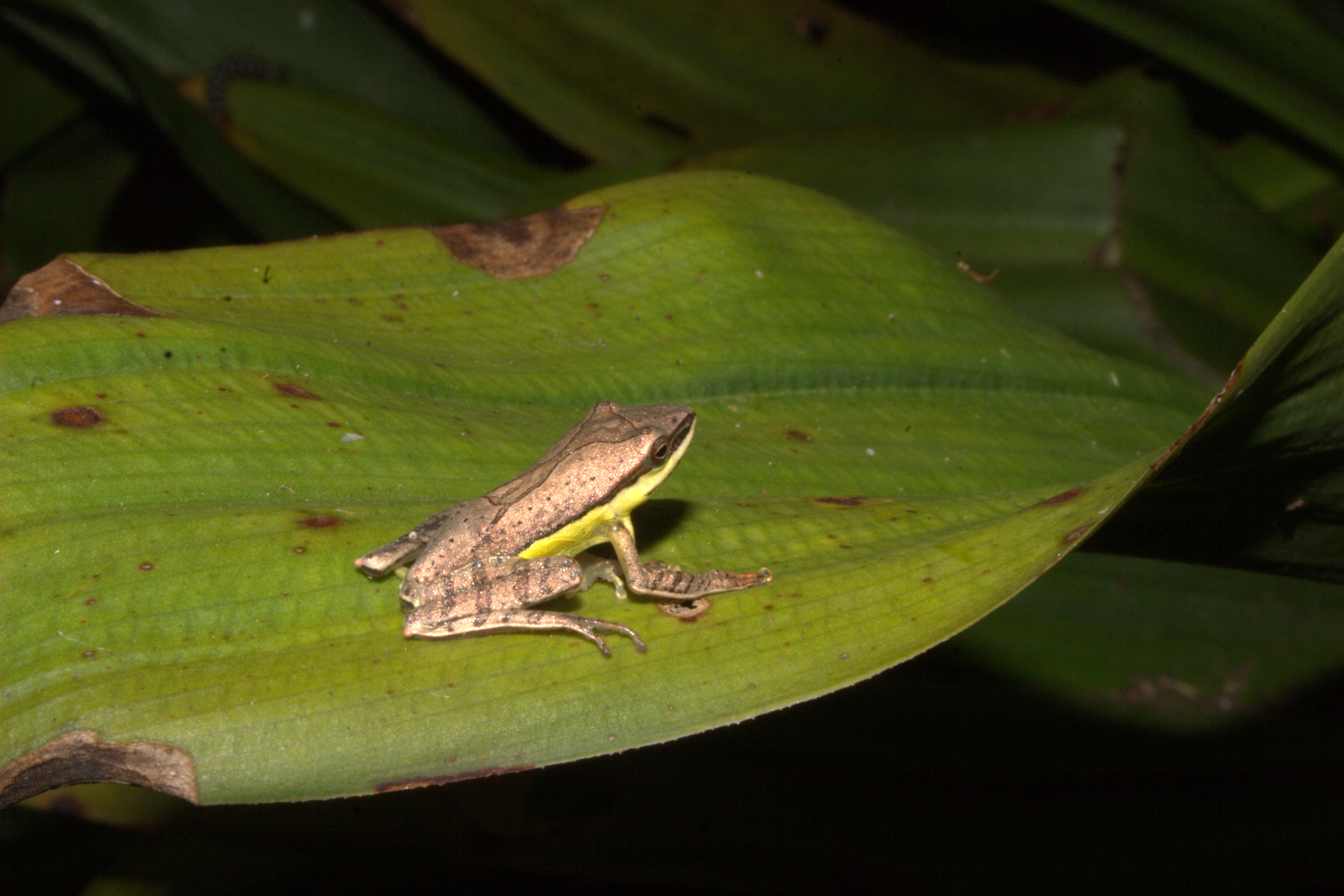
at Haggala

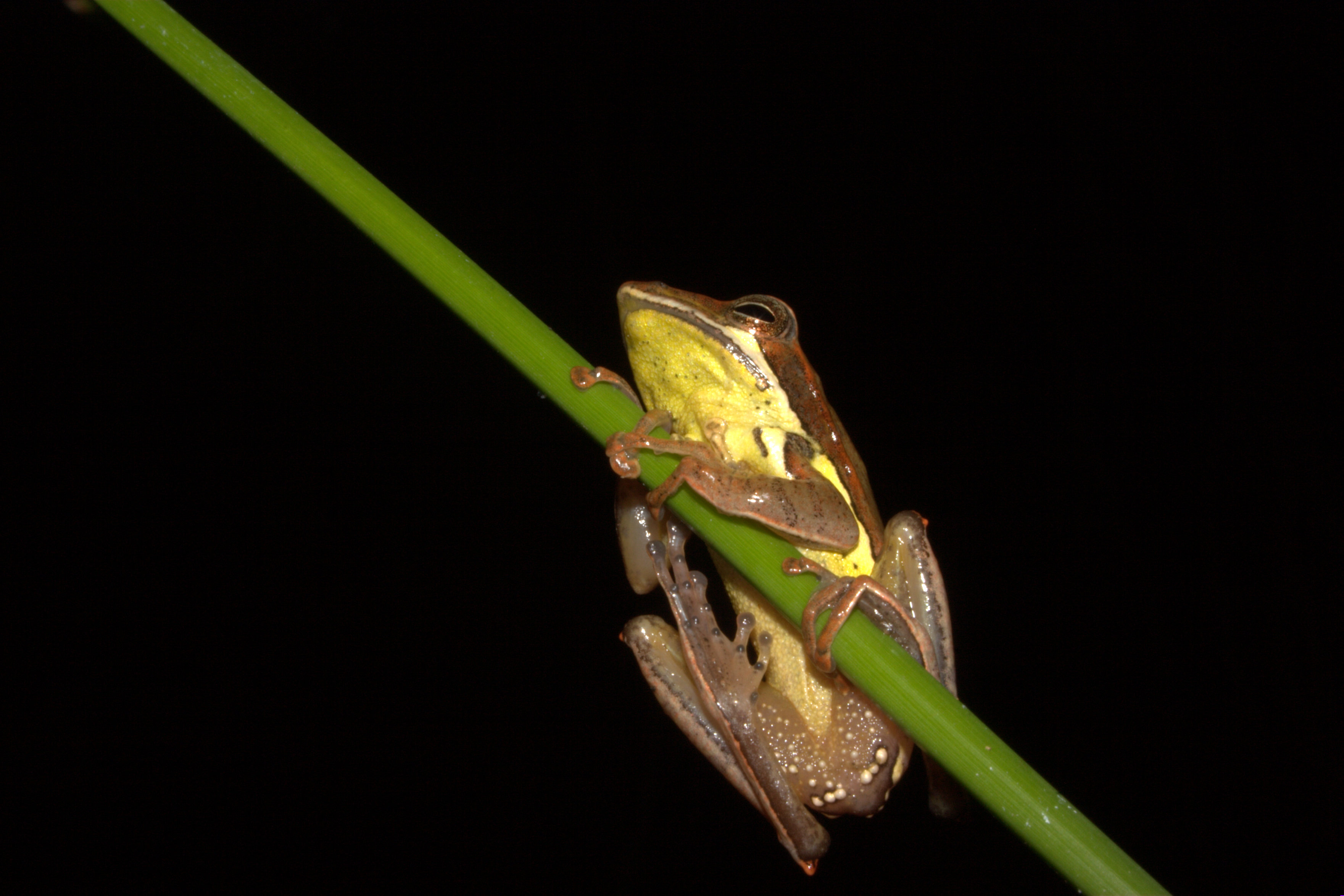
at Haggala

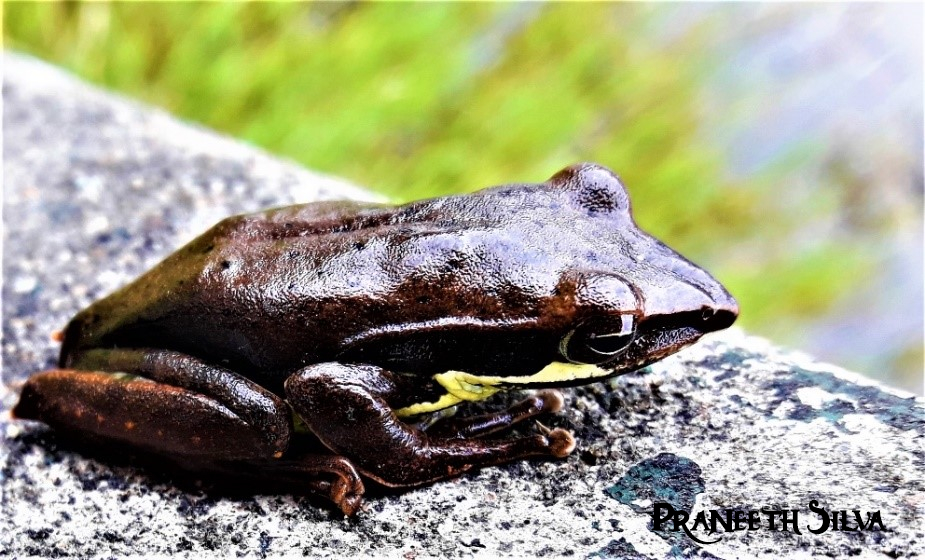
adult stage with dark brown dorsal colouration found in world heritage Horton Plains National Park

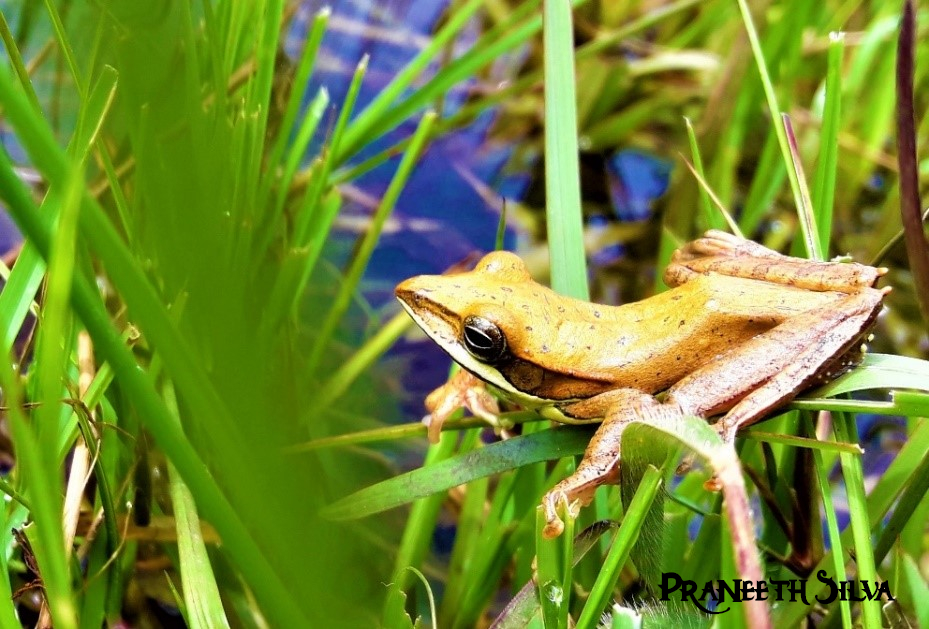
adult stage with yellow dorsal colouration found in world heritage Horton Plains National Park
