= Polypedates mutus =

Northern treefrog

Conservation status
- Least Concern (IUCN 3.1)

Scientific classification
- Kingdom: Animalia
- Phylum: Chordata
- Class: Amphibia
- Order: Anura
- Family: Rhacophoridae
- Genus: Polypedates
- Species: P. mutus

Binomial name
- Polypedates mutus (Smith, 1940)

Synonyms
- Rhacophorus mutus Smith, 1940

Species of amphibian

Polypedates mutus (common names: northern treefrog, Burmese whipping frog, and vocal sacless treefrog) is a species of frog in the family Rhacophoridae. It is found in southern and southwestern China, Myanmar, Laos, Thailand, and Vietnam. However, it may actually represent two different species. It is not known which one of these is the "true" Polypedates mutus as specimens from the type locality in northern Myanmar have not been analysed. Its natural habitats are forests and the surrounding areas. It breeds in standing water (e.g., pools, ponds, marshes, and paddy fields). It is suffering from habitat loss.
