= Kurima =

- Municipality
- Flag Coat of arms

- Location of Kurima in the Prešov Region Location of Kurima in Slovakia
- Coordinates: 49.23°N 21.45°E
- Country: Slovakia
- Region: Prešov Region
- District: Bardejov District
- First mentioned: 1270

Area
  - Total: 15.87 km^{2} (6.13 sq mi)
- Elevation: 215 m (705 ft)

Population (2025)
  - Total: 1,136
- Time zone: UTC+1 (CET)
  - Summer (DST): UTC+2 (CEST)
- Postal code: 861 2
- Area code: +421 54
- Vehicle registration plate (until 2022): BJ
- Website: www.kurima.eu

Kurima is a village and municipality in the Bardejov District in the Prešov Region of north-east Slovakia.

== History ==
In historical records, the village was first mentioned in 1270.

== Geography ==
The municipality lies at an altitude of 215 metres (705 ft) and covers an area of 15.87 km^{2} (6.13 sq mi) (2025).

== Population ==
Population statistic (10 years)
Year	1995	2005	2015	2025
Count	1049	1079	1130	1136
Difference		+2.85%	+4.72%	+0.53%

Population statistic
Year	2024	2025
Count	1125	1136
Difference		+0.97%

It has a population of 1136 people (31 December 2025).

=== Ethnicity ===
Census 2021 (1+ %)
Ethnicity	Number	Fraction
Slovak	1058	96.62%
Romani	97	8.85%
Not found out	38	3.47%
Rusyn	12	1.09%
Total	1095	

In year 2021 was 1095 people by ethnicity 1058 as Slovak, 97 as Romani, 38 as Not found out, 12 as Rusyn, 5 as Czech, 2 as Hungarian, 1 as Ukrainian and 1 as Italian.

Note on population: The difference values of population numbers in the table "Population statistic" and in the sections "Ethnicity" & "Religion" is caused by the use of various statistical methods.

=== Religion ===
Census 2021 (1+ %)
Religion	Number	Fraction
Roman Catholic Church	988	90.23%
None	30	2.74%
Greek Catholic Church	28	2.56%
Not found out	26	2.37%
Total	1095	

In year 2021 was 1095 people by religion 988 from Roman Catholic Church, 30 from None, 28 from Greek Catholic Church, 26 from Not found out, 9 from Evangelical Church, 5 from Christian Congregations in Slovakia, 3 from Jehovah's Witnesses, 2 from Eastern Orthodox Church, 2 from Other and 2 from Ad hoc movements.
