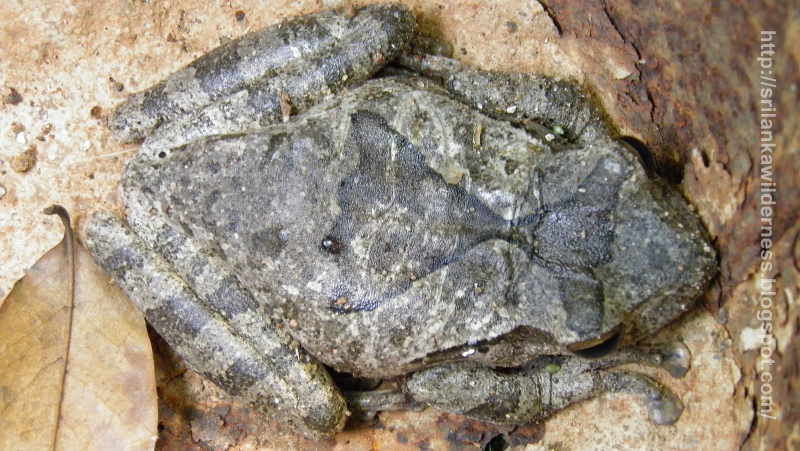

Conservation status
- Least Concern (IUCN 3.1)

Scientific classification
- Kingdom: Animalia
- Phylum: Chordata
- Class: Amphibia
- Order: Anura
- Family: Rhacophoridae
- Genus: Polypedates
- Species: P. cruciger

Binomial name
- Polypedates cruciger Blyth, 1852

= Polypedates cruciger =

Species of amphibian

Polypedates cruciger (commonly known as the Sri Lanka whipping frog or common hour-glass tree-frog) is a species of frog in the family Rhacophoridae endemic to Sri Lanka. It has been osbserved as high as 1600 meters above sea level.

This frog can tolerate different habitats, including secondary forest, banana farms, gardens, and buildings. Scientists have not seen this frog in primary forest.

Scientists say this frog is not in danger of dying out because of its large range and tolerance to altered habitat.

Scientists used to think frog was conspecific with Polypedates pseudocruciger, which lives in India's Western Ghat mountains.
