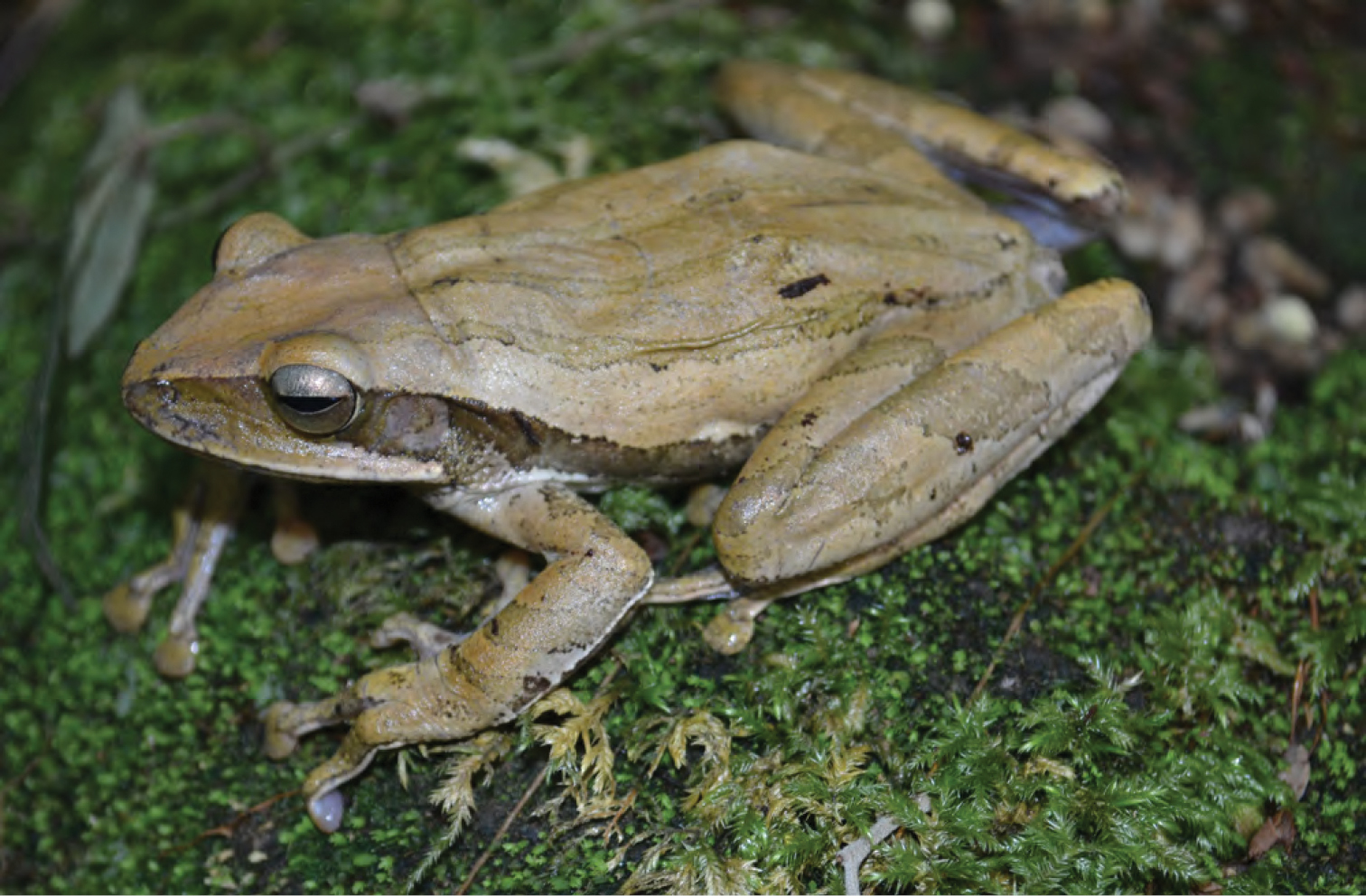
- Common tree frog (female)
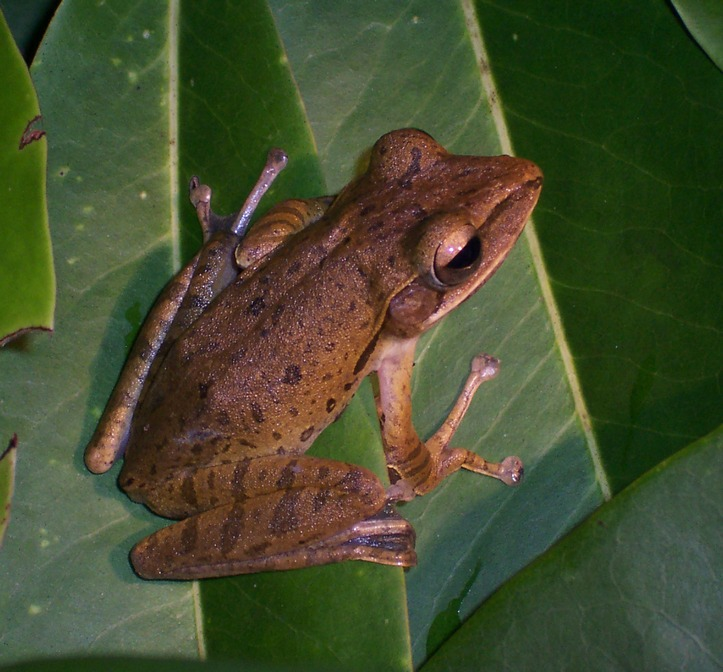
- Adult at Darmaga (Bogor Regency, West Java, Indonesia)

Conservation status
- Least Concern (IUCN 3.1)

Scientific classification
- Kingdom: Animalia
- Phylum: Chordata
- Class: Amphibia
- Order: Anura
- Family: Rhacophoridae
- Genus: Polypedates
- Species: P. leucomystax

Binomial name
- Polypedates leucomystax (Gravenhorst, 1829)

Synonyms
- Hyla leucomystax Gravenhorst, 1829; Polypedates rugosus Duméril & Bibron, 1841; Polypedates teraiensis (Dubois, 1987 "1986")

= Common tree frog =

Species of amphibian

Polypedates leucomystax is a species in the shrub frog family Rhacophoridae. It is known under numerous common names, including common tree frog, four-lined tree frog, golden tree frog or striped tree frog. Many past authors have united it with the common Indian tree frog in P. maculatus (or Rhacophorus maculatus, as was common in older times), but today they are generally considered distinct species. In its native range, it is also called "white-lipped tree frog", but this name is otherwise applied to a species of true tree frogs (family Hylidae).

Polypedates leucomystax is not considered a threatened species by the IUCN. It is, in fact a species complex containing various cryptic species within it.

== Range ==
Previously, P. leucomystex was thought to distribute below the Red River of Vietnam and in western Yunnan, while P. megacephalus can be found above the Red River and in Northeast India. However, recent genetic studies revealed that the natural barriers between these species are the Isthmus of Kra and the Tenasserim Range, where P. leucomystax can be found below the isthmus and west of the range.

The Polypedates leucomystax complex began diverging during the Pliocene, and spread quickly after the Pleistocene due to human activity. The range of P. leucomystax has recently expanded in the Philippines and Indonesia due to the widespread conversion of forests into agricultural-use land. It is also frequently found in trans-island agricultural shipments. Lineages on the Indochina mainland are more diverse.

In Indonesia, it has been found throughout the archipelago in Borneo, Mentawai, Sumatra, Java, Sulawesi, Bali, Lombok, Natuna Islands, Anambas Islands, Sumbawa, Sumba, Flores, and Timor, and has also been introduced to Papua. In Japan, where it has been introduced, it is found on the islands of Okinawa, Tonaki, Kurima, Miyako, Ie, Iheya, Izena, Sesoko, and Yabuchi.

4 major haplotype clades of P. leucomystax have been recognized by Brown, et al. (2010), with the clades other than the southern Sunda region clade likely to be cryptic species.

- southern Sunda region: Java–Sumatra ("true" P. leucomystax; type locality: Java)
- northern Sunda region: Peninsular Malaysia, northern Borneo (Sarawak and Sabah), and southern Philippines (most basal clade)
- Sulawesi (with the name P. celebensis sp. nov. suggested; 4 different sub-clades have been differentiated for each of the 4 "prongs" or peninsulas of Sulawesi Island)
- northern Philippines (with the name P. quadrilineatus sp. nov. suggested; includes a basal variety from Lombok)

Divergent varieties that are either P. cf. leucomystax or P. cf. megacephalus have been found in southern China (including Hainan) and Vietnam.

== Habitat ==
Its natural habitats are subtropical or tropical dry forests, subtropical or tropical moist lowland forests, subtropical or tropical moist montane forests, subtropical or tropical moist shrubland, subtropical or tropical seasonally wet or flooded lowland grassland, rivers, intermittent rivers, freshwater lakes, intermittent freshwater lakes, freshwater marshes, intermittent freshwater marshes, freshwater springs, rocky shores, coastal freshwater lagoons, arable land, pastureland, plantations, rural gardens, urban areas, water storage areas, ponds, aquaculture ponds, irrigated land, seasonally flooded agricultural land, and introduced vegetation.

== Description ==
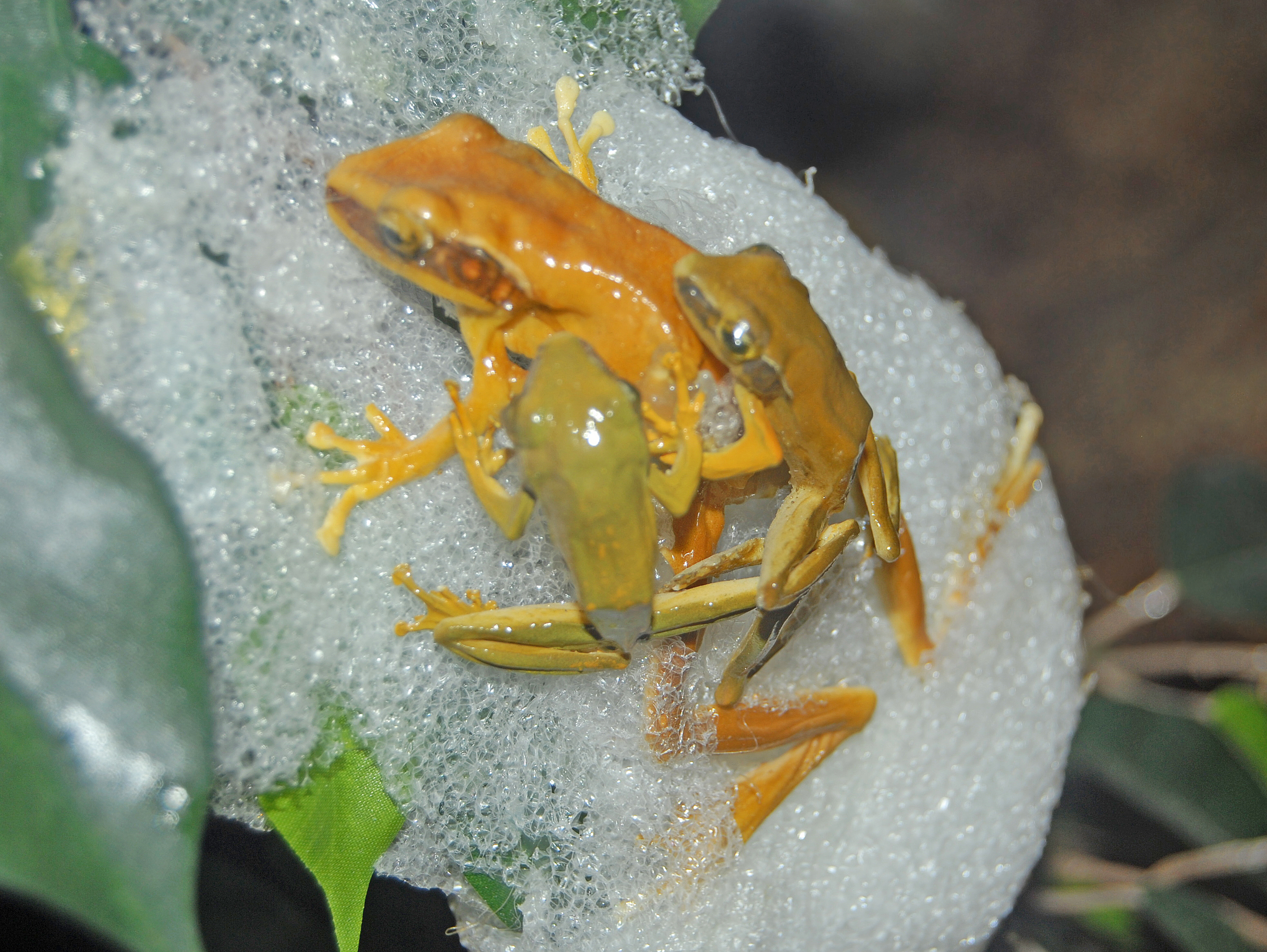
Mating frogs with foam nest

Polypedates leucomystax can reach approximately a snout–vent length of 3.7–5.0 centimetres (1.5–2.0 in) in males, and 5.7–7.5 centimetres (2.2–3.0 in) in females. Body of these rather small shrub frogs is moderately slender, ovoid, slightly flattened above, with sharply pointed tail. The skin on the upper side is smooth. The body colour is rather variable, with various shades of gray, green, yellow, reddish or dark brown. Usually it is irregularly mottled, often with four stripes along the back. The tip of snout sometimes shows a distinct white spot. Eyes are at the side of the head. The hind feet are webbed. The feet have clear, large cushions as usual with leaf frogs.

== Biology ==
In the damp areas of the propagation, these frogs are present all year round. In drier environments, the period usually restricts to the beginning of the rainy season. The mating takes place at the margins of shallow pools, where the males first arrive and call the females with a distinctive loud, duck-like sound. The female places between 100 and 400 eggs in a protective foam nest that is attached to vegetation or other objects above the water surface. Mean egg diameter is 1.99mm (range of 1.9-2.1mm). The eggs hatch after 3 to 4 days. The tadpoles develop inside the foam nest and then fall into the water. They develop into adult frogs in about 7 weeks.

== In captivity ==
This species of tree frog is commonly kept in captivity in vivariums and terrariums by both hobbyists and professionals.
