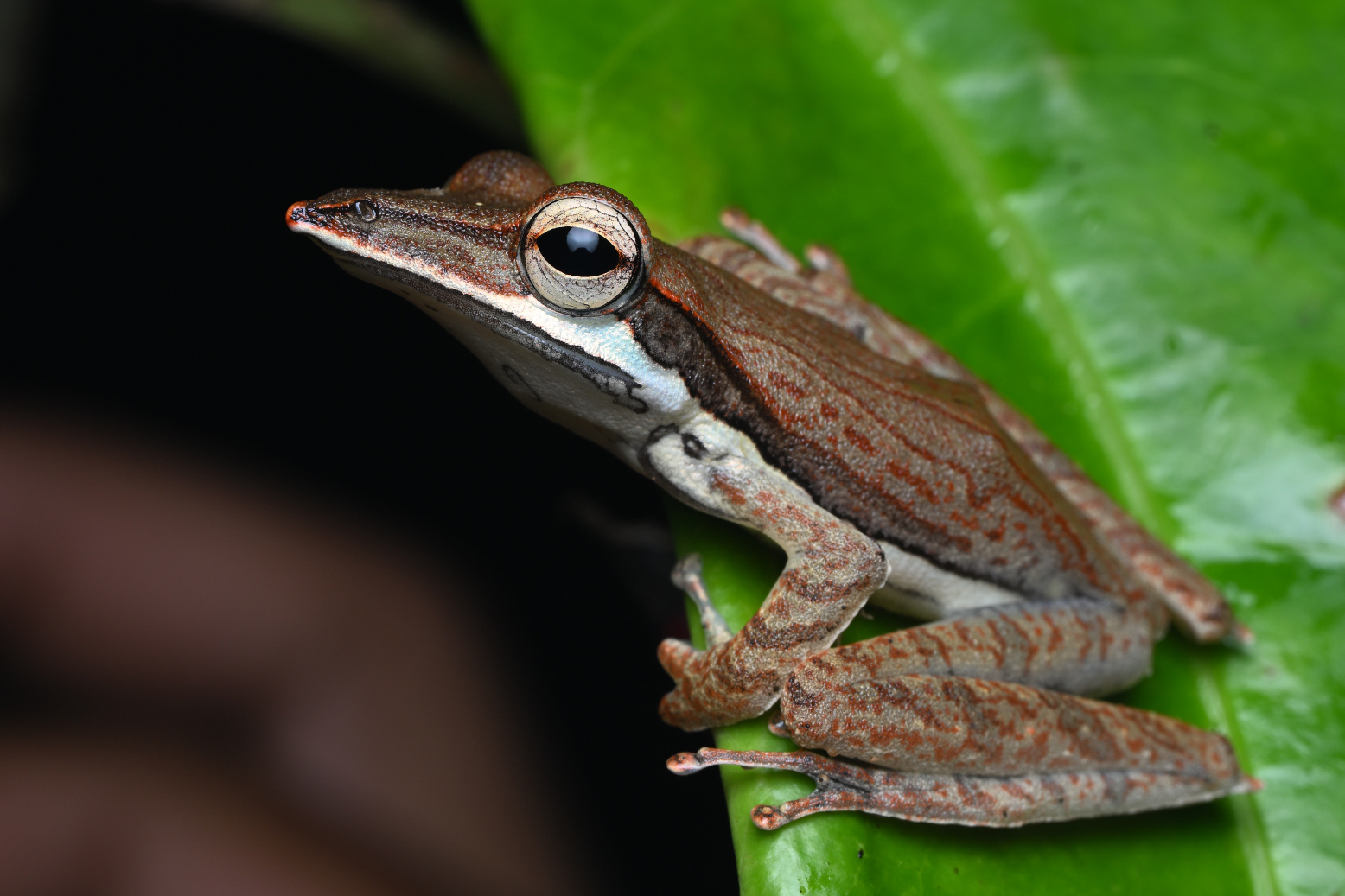

Conservation status
- Endangered (IUCN 3.1)

Scientific classification
- Kingdom: Animalia
- Phylum: Chordata
- Class: Amphibia
- Order: Anura
- Family: Rhacophoridae
- Genus: Taruga
- Species: T. longinasus

Binomial name
- Taruga longinasus (Ahl, 1927)

Synonyms
- Polypedates longinasus (Ahl, 1927)

= Taruga longinasus =

Species of amphibian

Taruga longinasus (common names: southern whipping frog, long-snouted tree-frog) is a species of frog in the family Rhacophoridae. It is endemic to Sri Lanka. It has been observed between 150 and 1300 m above sea level.

== Appearance ==
The adult male frog measures about 41–47 mm in snout-vent length and the adult female frog 57–60 mm. The skin of the dorsum is dark brown or red-brown in color with a red stripe from the nose to the middle of each flank. The frog's lips are white or yellow. Its legs are brown with marks.

== Life cycle ==
These frogs are arboreal and live high in the trees. They can jump very well. When it is time to lay eggs, the adult frogs climb down to pools of water near streams. They female frog lays 28 to 42 eggs per clutch. The tadpoles grow into frogs in ten weeks.

== Habitat and threats ==
The IUCN classifies this frog as endangered due to habitat loss. The frog is threatened by firewood collection and conversion of forest to both small- and large-scale farms, including those for cash crops like tea, cinnamon, rubber, and palm oil. The pesticides and fertilizers involved can also kill the frog directly.. Small hydroelectric projects also disrupt its habitat.

Scientists cite climate change as an additional threat to this frog. The frog lives in the only part of South Asia that scientists classify as "perhumid": It has a short dry season and large amounts of rain, which create unique forests. Climate change could alter the rain cycle and increase the rate of forest fires.
