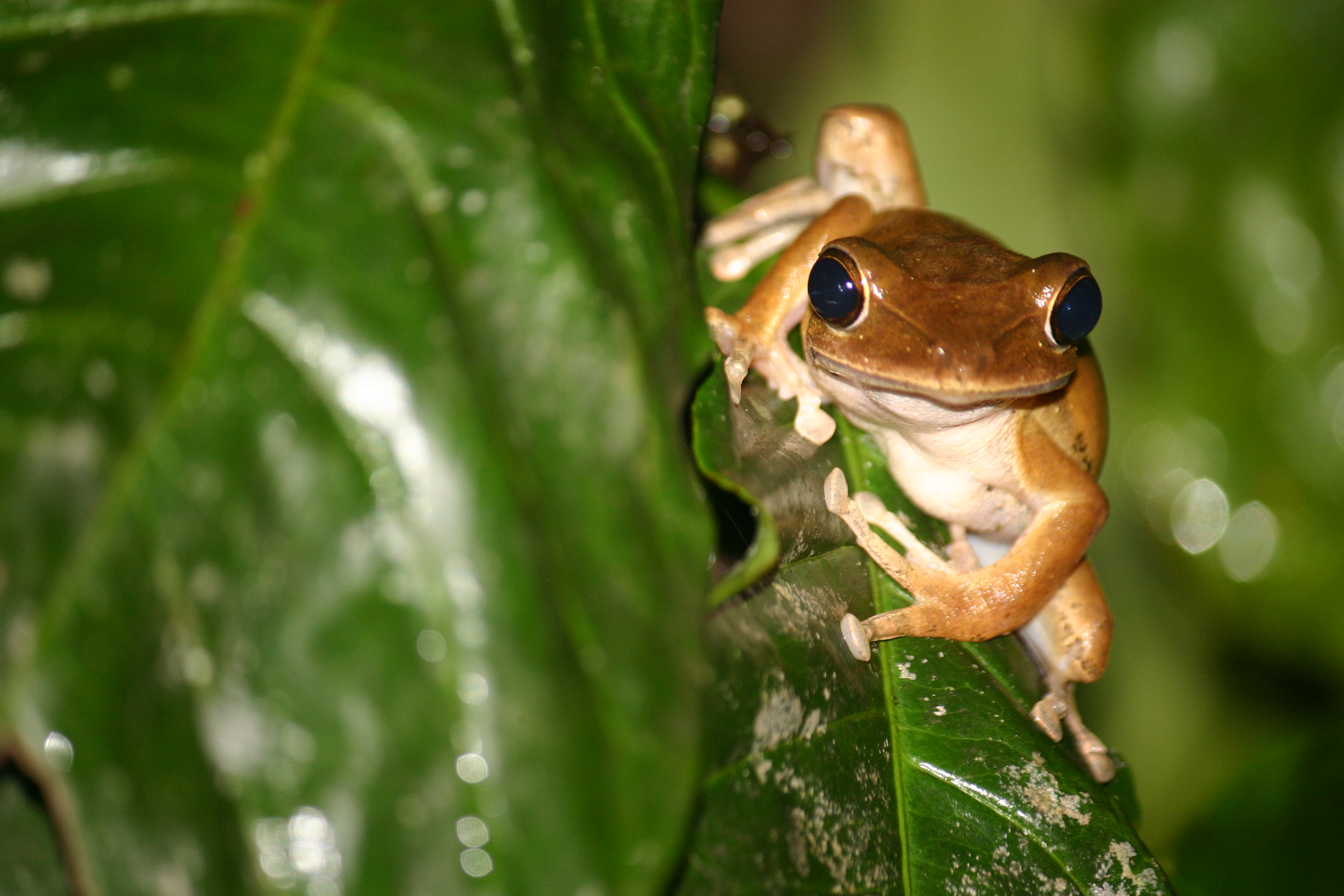

Conservation status
- Least Concern (IUCN 3.1)

Scientific classification
- Kingdom: Animalia
- Phylum: Chordata
- Class: Amphibia
- Order: Anura
- Family: Rhacophoridae
- Genus: Polypedates
- Species: P. pseudocruciger

Binomial name
- Polypedates pseudocruciger Das & Ravichandran, 1998

= Polypedates pseudocruciger =

False hour-glass tree frog

Species of amphibian

Polypedates pseudocruciger (common names: false hour-glass tree frog or yellow tree frog) is a species of frog in the family Rhacophoridae endemic to the southern Western Ghats, India. It is a common and widespread frog. It is an arboreal edge habitat species generally associated with the understorey of tropical, moist evergreen forest. It breeds in small temporary ponds. Eggs are laid on a leaf over the pond.

Polypedates pseudocruciger can also occur in disturbed habitats close to human habitations, but severe habitat degradation is a threat to this species.

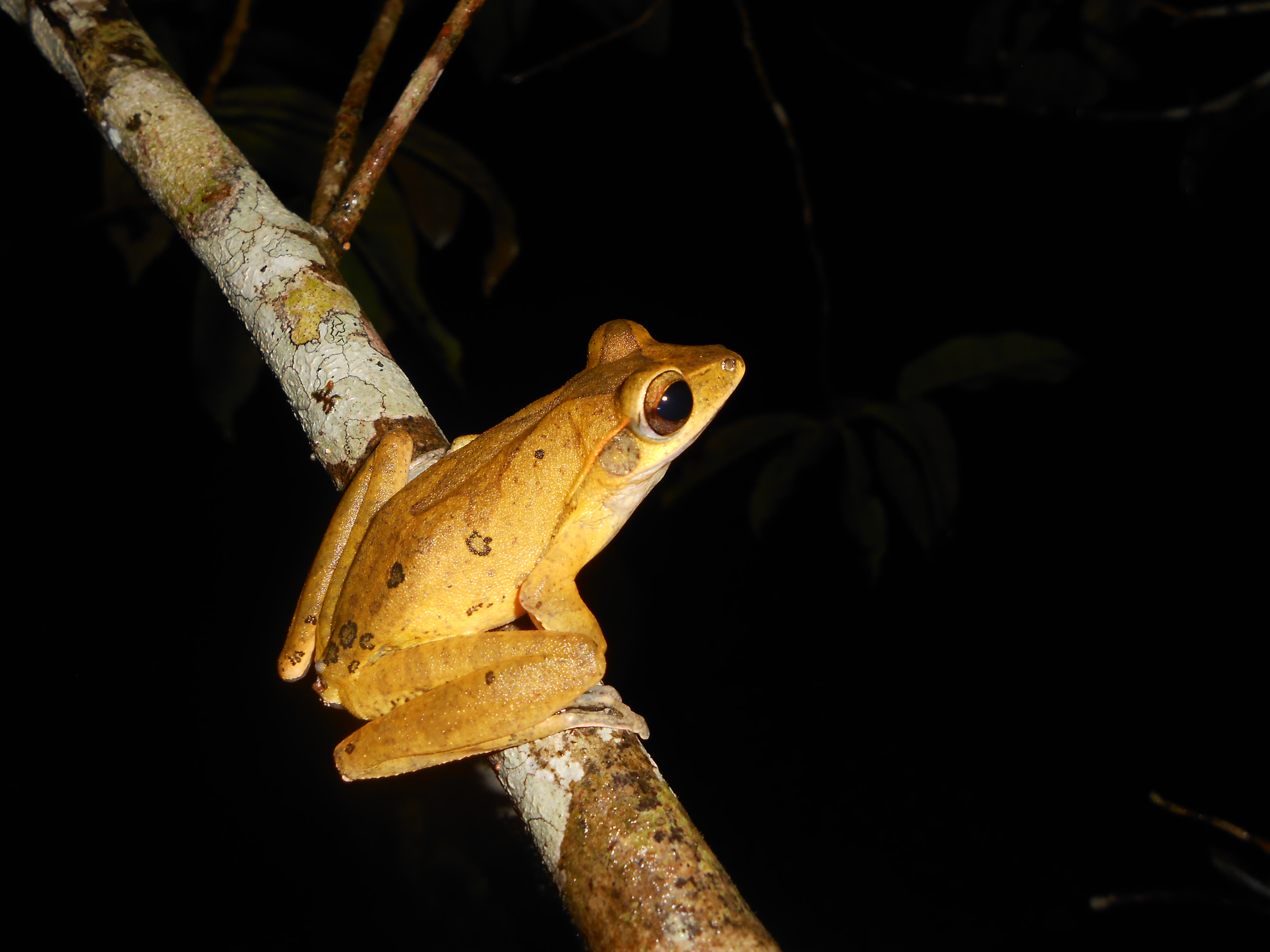
A male Polypedates pseudocruciger from Karnataka
