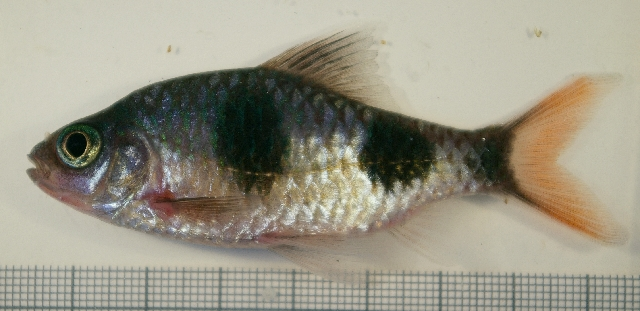

Conservation status
- Endangered (IUCN 3.1)

Scientific classification
- Kingdom: Animalia
- Phylum: Chordata
- Class: Actinopterygii
- Order: Cypriniformes
- Family: Cyprinidae
- Subfamily: Smiliogastrinae
- Genus: Dawkinsia
- Species: D. arulius

Binomial name
- Dawkinsia arulius (Jerdon, 1849)

Synonyms
- Systomus arulius Jerdon, 1849; Barbus arulius (Jerdon, 1849); Puntius rubrotinctus (Jerdon, 1849); Systomus rubrotinctus (Jerdon, 1849)

= Arulius barb =

Species of fish

The Arulius barb (Dawkinsia arulius) is a tropical cyprinid fish native to the Kaveri River basin of south east India. Other common names include Tamiraparani barb, Silas barb and longfin barb.

== Description ==
Adult fish are dark brownish olive on the back, becoming lighter on the sides to white on the ventral surface. It has a black, vertical blotch in the middle of its body, above the origin of its pelvic fin. It has a second black, vertical blotch above its anal fin, and a third black bar or blotch on the base of the caudal fin, though less well defined as the other two blotches. The fins are thin and transparent or translucent. Adults possess more pronounced colors than the juvenile. The adult male gets filament-like extensions to the branched dorsal-fin rays like the closely related filament barb species found in Tambraparni River basin, Dawkinsia tambraparniei, the use of the common name, longfin barb is quite often accepted (Dawkinsia filamentosa). It reaches an adult size of 12 centimetres (4.7 in) TL.

== Habitat ==
Its native habitat is large streams, rivers, and lakes, with a pH of 6.0 – 6.5, dH of 10, and temperature 19 °C to 25 °C.

== Etymology ==
The name arulius is derived from the name "aruli" used by local inhabitants.

== In the aquarium ==
Though less common to the hobby than other related barbs, this peaceful, active, egg-laying fish is compatible with other related species in the home aquarium such as tiger barbs (Puntigrus tetrazona), and rosy barbs (Pethia conchonius) and other fast swimming cyprinid species of similar size. Also compatible with some cichlid species, but smaller fish such as neon tetras would be at risk of predation. As with many barbs, nippy behavior is common, but alleviated by keeping the fish in numbers of at least 5–6 individuals in the aquarium, while taking into account the space requirements of the adult size of 4–5 inches (10–12 cm).

== See also ==
- List of freshwater aquarium fish species
