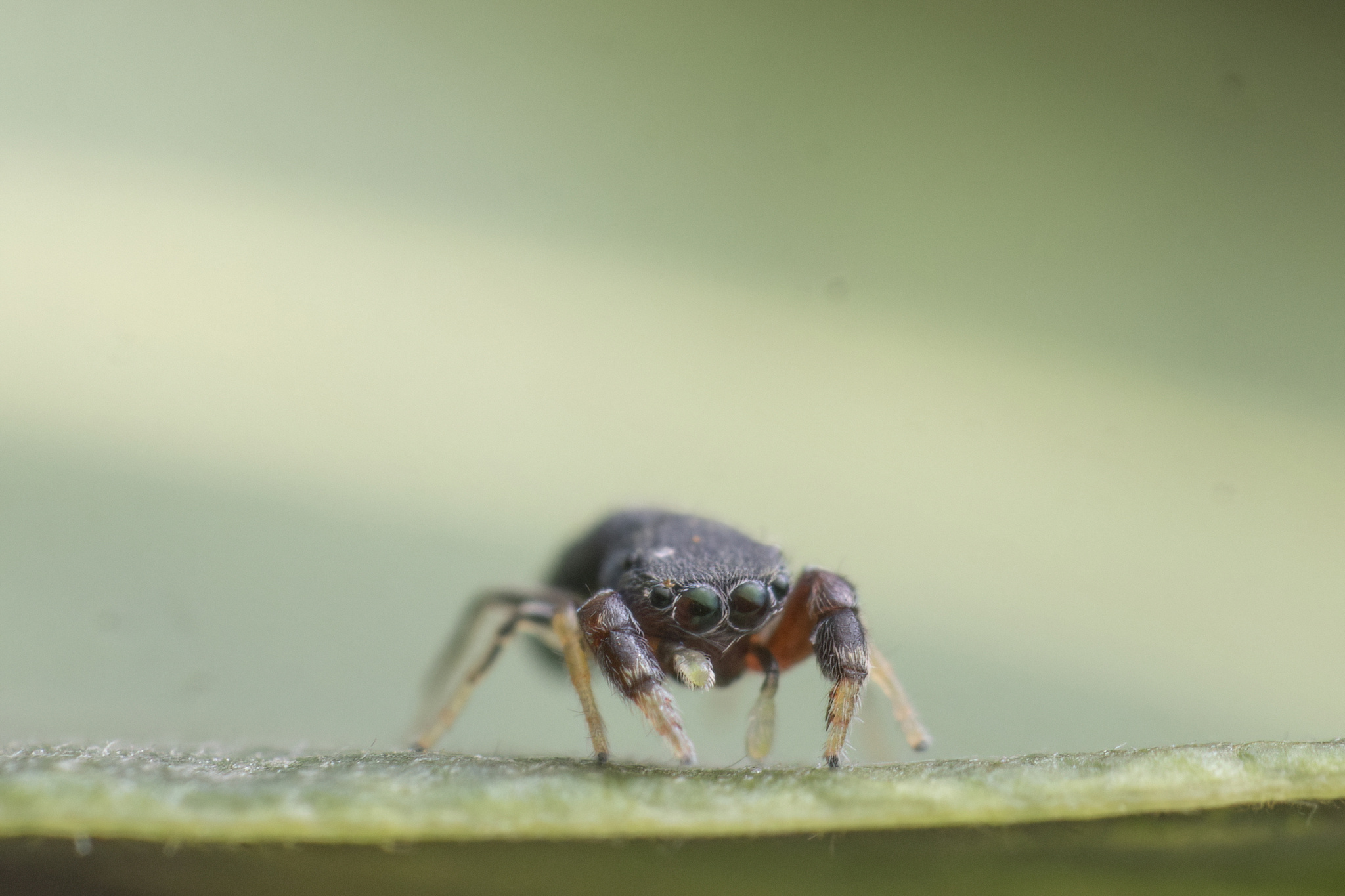
- Marengo sachintendulkar from Sithalapakkam, Chennai, Tamil Nadu.

Scientific classification
- Kingdom: Animalia
- Phylum: Arthropoda
- Subphylum: Chelicerata
- Class: Arachnida
- Order: Araneae
- Infraorder: Araneomorphae
- Family: Salticidae
- Genus: Marengo
- Species: M. sachintendulkar

Binomial name
- Marengo sachintendulkar Malamel, Prajapati, Sudhikumar & Sebastian, 2019

= Marengo sachintendulkar =

Species of spider

Marengo sachintendulkar is a species of jumping spider from India. It is named after the Indian former international cricketer, Sachin Tendulkar.

== Diagnosis ==
Marengo sachintendulkar is most similar to Marengo crassipes and Marengo nitida, but it can be distinguished from them both by the abdomen having a median discontinuous whitish transverse band and two antero-medial longitudinal stripes reaching the transverse band. It also can be distinguished by the presence of a cheliceral notch in the males that makes a significant gap between the chelicerae and "S-shaped" insemination ducts in the females.

== Range ==
Marengo sachintendulkar is only known to be distributed to north-west and southern India. Type specimens were collected from Gujarat University in Gujarat, Vedanthangal Bird Sanctuary of Kanchipuram district in Tamil Nadu and Pathiramanal island of Kerala.

== See also ==
- List of organisms named after famous people (born 1950–1974)
