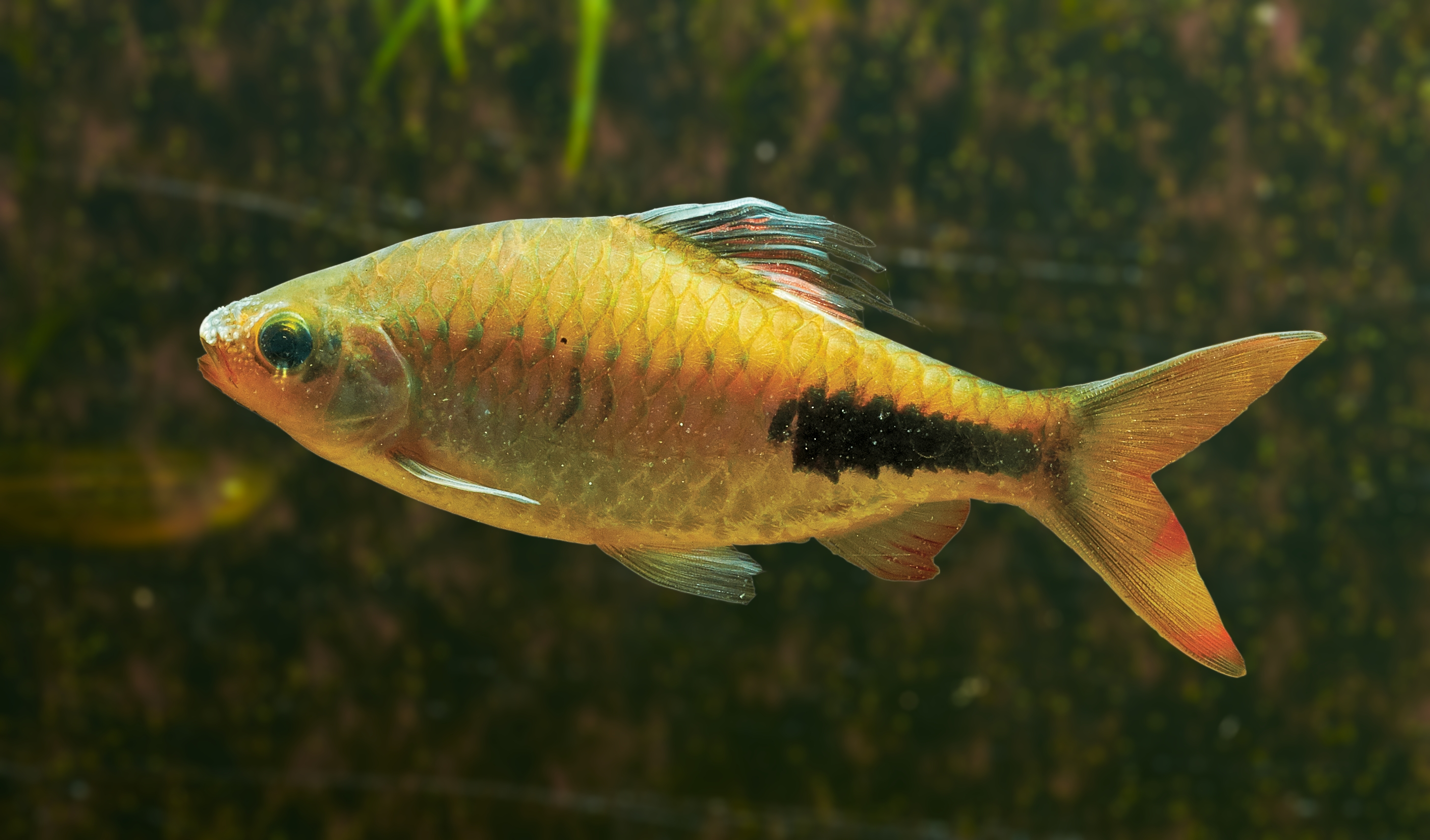

Conservation status
- Endangered (IUCN 3.1)

Scientific classification
- Kingdom: Animalia
- Phylum: Chordata
- Class: Actinopterygii
- Order: Cypriniformes
- Family: Cyprinidae
- Subfamily: Smiliogastrinae
- Genus: Dawkinsia
- Species: D. exclamatio

Binomial name
- Dawkinsia exclamatio (Pethiyagoda & Kottelat, 2005)

Synonyms
- Puntius exclamatio Pethiyagoda & Kottelat, 2005

= Dawkinsia exclamatio =

Species of fish

Dawkinsia exclamatio is a species of cyprinid fish found in Kallada River, Kerala, India where it occurs in areas with clear water with pebble and rock substrates. This species can reach a length of 8.3 centimetres (3.3 in) SL.
