= Pengmarengo =

Scientific classification
- Kingdom: Animalia
- Phylum: Arthropoda
- Subphylum: Chelicerata
- Class: Arachnida
- Order: Araneae
- Infraorder: Araneomorphae
- Family: Salticidae
- Genus: Pengmarengo; Wang & Li, 2022

Type species
- P. yangi Wang & Li, 2022

Species
- 6, see text

Genus of spiders

Pengmarengo is a genus of spiders in the family Salticidae.

== Distribution ==
The genus Pengmarengo is found in China and Indonesia, with three species occurring in China and two species in Indonesia (Borneo, Java, and Sumatra).

== Etymology ==
The genus name is a combination of the related genus Marengo and arachnologist Xian-Jin Peng (彭贤锦; Péng Xiánjǐn). P. yangi is named after Yuanfa Yang, one of the collectors of the species.

== Species ==
As of January 2026, this genus includes six species:

- Pengmarengo chelifer (Simon, 1900) – Indonesia (Borneo, Java)
- Pengmarengo elongata (Peng & Li, 2002)
- Pengmarengo gepeng Dhiya'ulhaq, 2025 – Indonesia (Sumatra)
- Pengmarengo wengnan (Wang & Li, 2022) – China
- Pengmarengo yangi Wang & Li, 2022 – China (Hainan)
- Pengmarengo yui (Wang & Li, 2020) – China
