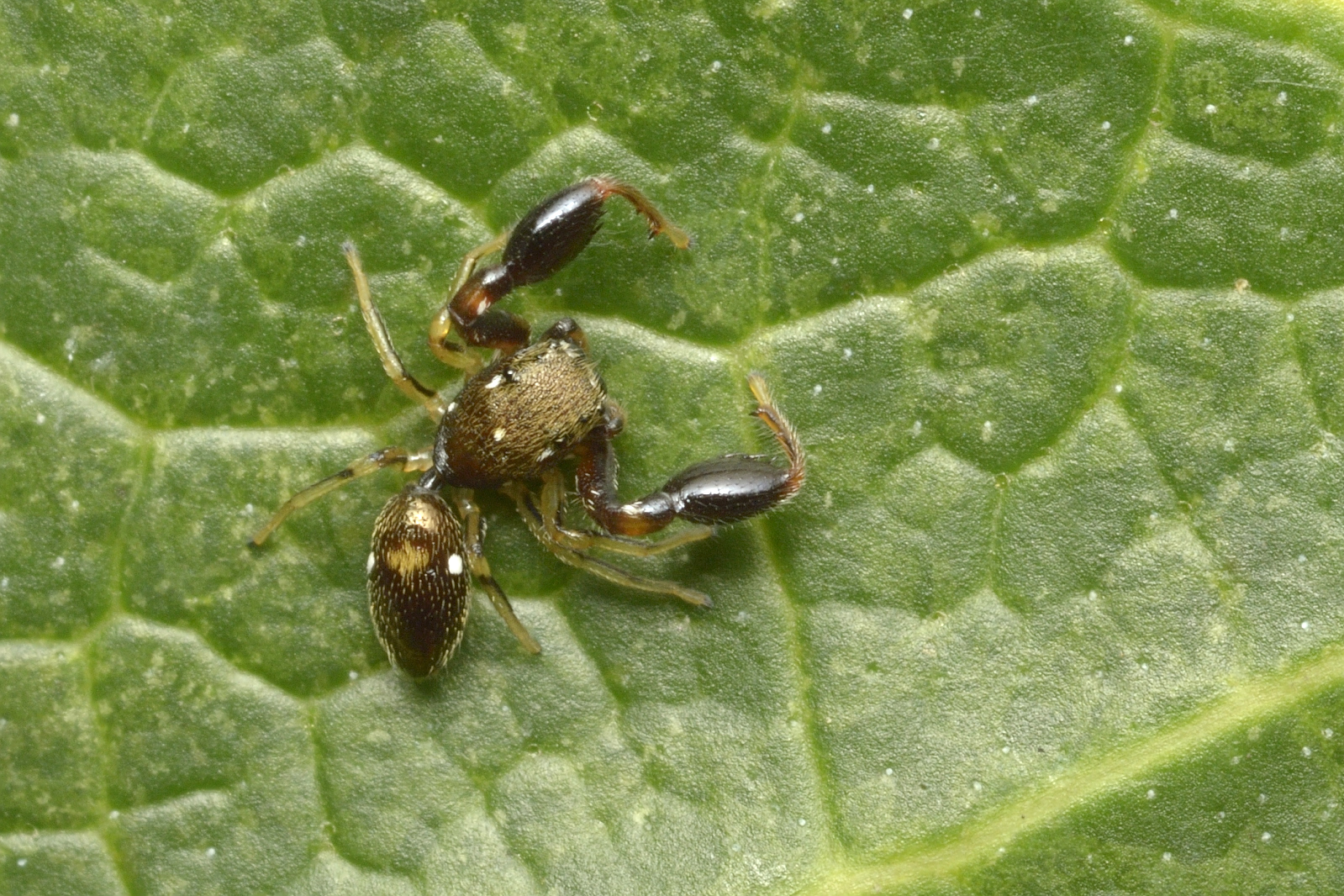
- From Kochi, Kerala, India.

Scientific classification
- Kingdom: Animalia
- Phylum: Arthropoda
- Subphylum: Chelicerata
- Class: Arachnida
- Order: Araneae
- Infraorder: Araneomorphae
- Family: Salticidae
- Genus: Marengo
- Species: M. batheryensis

Binomial name
- Marengo batheryensis Sudhin, Nafin, Benjamin & Sudhikumar, 2019

= Marengo batheryensis =

Species of spider

Marengo batheryensis is a species of jumping spider endemic to India.

== Description ==
The female of Marengo batheryensis has white lateral spots on the carapace and three white spots forming a triangle on the abdomen, distinguishing it from M. striatipes. The male is similar to M. striatipes except for slender femur 1.

== Range ==
Marengo batheryensis is endemic to India. Its type locality is the Sulthan Bathery Range within the Wayanad Wildlife Sanctuary of Kerala.

== Etymology ==
The specific epithet is an adjective derived from the last name of the forest range (Sulthan Bathery) from where the type specimen of Marengo batheryensis was collected.
