= Dawkinsia uttara =

Scientific classification
- Kingdom: Animalia
- Phylum: Chordata
- Class: Actinopterygii
- Order: Cypriniformes
- Family: Cyprinidae
- Genus: Dawkinsia
- Species: D. uttara

Binomial name
- Dawkinsia uttara Katwate, Apte, Raghavan, 2020

Species of freshwater fish

Dawkinsia uttara, the northern filament barb, is a species of freshwater fish belonging to the family Cyprinidae.

== Etymology ==
The genus name Dawkinsia was given in honour of the evolutionary biologist Richard Dawkins, while the species name uttara refers to Uttara Katwate, mother of the species author Unmesh Katwate.

== Description ==
Dawkinsia uttara is a small-sized fish, reaching up to 12 cm (4.7 in) in length. Phylogentically, Dawkinsia uttara is part of the "filamentosa" species group, differing from its closest congener Dawkinsia filamentosa in having a caudal fin with a narrower elongate black subdistal band and a terminal rather than subterminal mouth.

== Distribution and habitat ==
Dawkinsia uttara is found in the upper reaches of the Kajali, Terekhol, and Jagbudi Rivers of Maharashtra in the northern Western Ghats. It inhabits shallow and slow-moving streams, where it feeds on small invertebrates.
