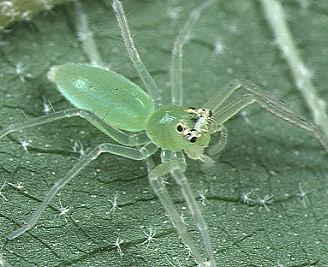
- Female O. kanoi
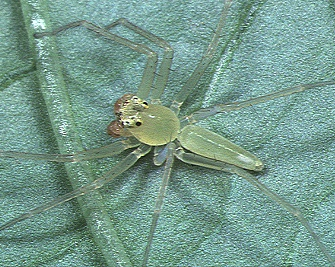
- Male O. kanoi

Scientific classification
- Kingdom: Animalia
- Phylum: Arthropoda
- Subphylum: Chelicerata
- Class: Arachnida
- Order: Araneae
- Infraorder: Araneomorphae
- Family: Salticidae
- Subfamily: Onomastinae
- Genus: Onomastus; Simon, 1900

Type species
- O. nigricaudus Simon, 1900

Species
- See text.

= Onomastus =

Genus of spiders

Onomastus is a genus of Asian jumping spiders (family Salticidae) that was first described by Eugène Louis Simon in 1900. It is the only genus in the subfamily Onomastinae.

== Description ==
Onomastus species are delicate, translucent spiders, with long legs compared to most other members of the family Salticidae. Males have highly complex, species specific palpal bulbs, which suggests rapid divergent evolution. Two clades have been distinguished: in species from Southeast Asia, the palpal bulb has a broad conductor; in those from South Asia it has a medial branch on the median apophysis. Like species of the subfamilies Lyssomaninae and Asemoneinae, the anterior lateral eyes form a separate row from the anterior median eyes. The genus was originally diagnosed on the basis of the arrangement of the eyes. Species of the South Asian clade are considered highly endangered due to habitat loss and climate change.

== Taxonomy ==
The genus Onomastus was first described by Eugène Simon in 1900. He placed it in the "Attidae", the name he then used for the family Salticidae. It was later placed in a broadly defined subfamily Lyssomaninae, although by the 1980s it was agreed that this subfamily consisted of three groups. When Wayne Maddison divided the subfamily into three in 2015, the genus was placed in its own subfamily, Onomastinae.

=== Species ===
As of 2024, it contains eighteen species, found only in Asia:

- Onomastus chenae Lin & Li, 2020 – China
- Onomastus complexipalpis Wanless, 1980 – Borneo
- Onomastus corbetensis Benjamin & Kanesharatnam, 2016 – Sri Lanka
- Onomastus danum Prószyński & Deeleman-Reinhold, 2013 – Borneo
- Onomastus indra Benjamin, 2010 – India
- Onomastus jamestaylori Benjamin & Kanesharatnam, 2016 – Sri Lanka
- Onomastus kaharian Benjamin, 2010 – Thailand, Indonesia (Borneo)
- Onomastus kanoi Ono, 1995 – Japan (Okinawa)
- Onomastus maskeliya Benjamin & Kanesharatnam, 2016 – Sri Lanka
- Onomastus nigricaudus Simon, 1900 (type) – Sri Lanka
- Onomastus nigrimaculatus Zhang & Li, 2005 – China, Thailand
- Onomastus patellaris Simon, 1900 – India
- Onomastus pethiyagodai Benjamin, 2010 – Sri Lanka
- Onomastus quinquenotatus Simon, 1900 – Sri Lanka
- Onomastus rattotensis Benjamin, 2010 – Sri Lanka
- Onomastus simoni Zabka, 1985 – Vietnam
- Onomastus subchenae C. Wang, W. H. Wang & Peng, 2021 – China
- Onomastus zhuwu Lin & Li, 2024 – China
