= Dawkinsia chalakkudiensis =

Conservation status
- Endangered (IUCN 3.1)

Scientific classification
- Kingdom: Animalia
- Phylum: Chordata
- Class: Actinopterygii
- Order: Cypriniformes
- Family: Cyprinidae
- Subfamily: Smiliogastrinae
- Genus: Dawkinsia
- Species: D. chalakkudiensis

Binomial name
- Dawkinsia chalakkudiensis (Menon, Rema Devi & Thobias, 1999)

Synonyms
- Puntius chalakkudiensis Menon, Rema Devi & Thobias, 1999; Sahyadria chalakkudiensis (Menon, Rema Devi & Thobias, 1999)

Species of ray-finned fish

Dawkinsia chalakkudiensis is a species of cyprinid fish endemic to the Chalakudy River, Kerala, India in the Western Ghats where it can be found in well-vegetated upper reaches of rivers. This species can reach a length of 12.5 centimetres (4.9 in) TL. It resembles the related D. denisonii, but the colours of D. chalakkudiensis are less intense.

This fish along with D. denisonii is also known as Miss Kerala due to its bright color band and shiny scales. It is endangered by the international pet trade, habitat alteration, fisheries, and invasive fish. The presence of a black marking in the dorsal-fin identifies this species from D. denisonii.
