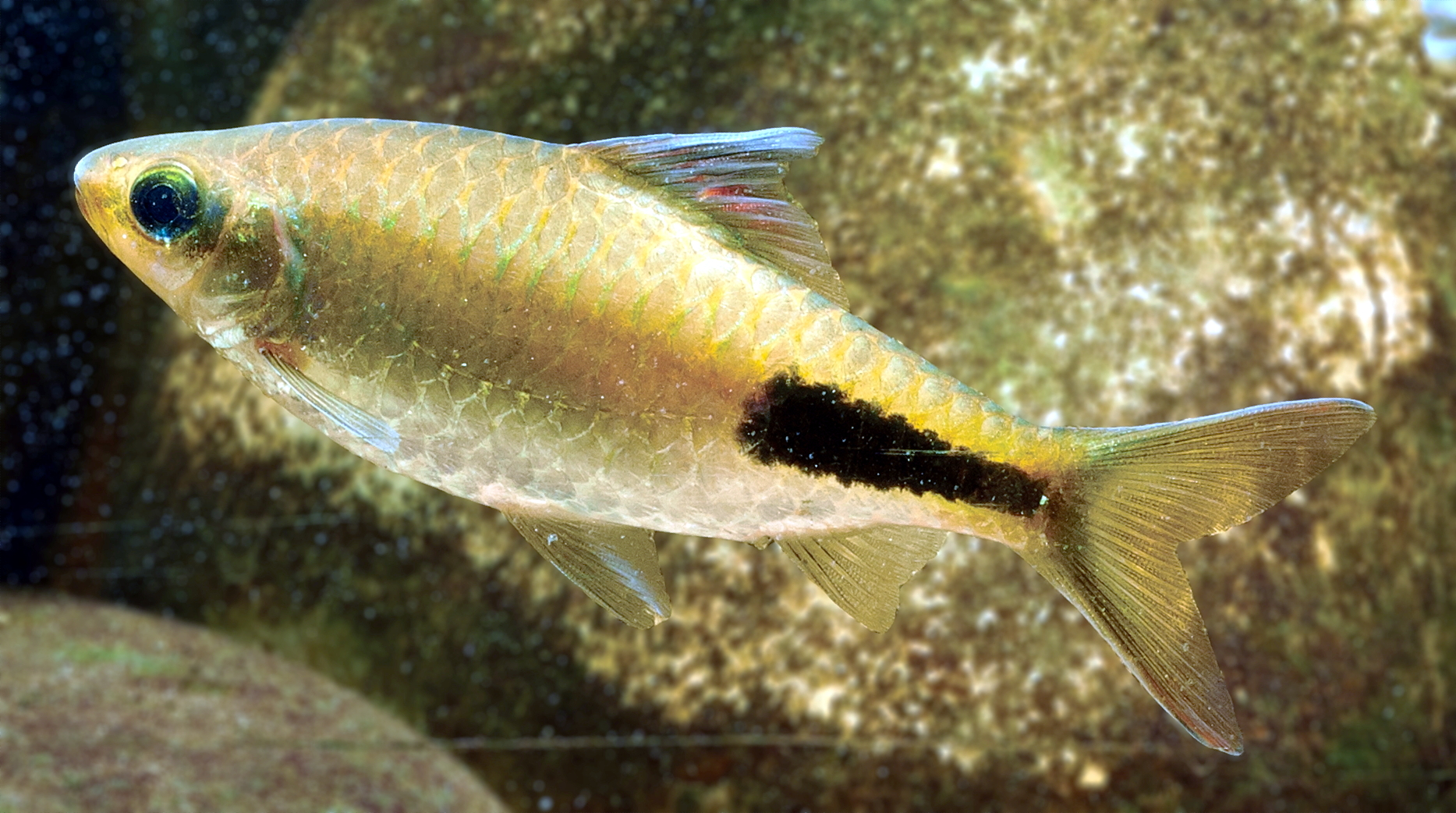

Conservation status
- Vulnerable (IUCN 3.1)

Scientific classification
- Kingdom: Animalia
- Phylum: Chordata
- Class: Actinopterygii
- Order: Cypriniformes
- Family: Cyprinidae
- Subfamily: Smiliogastrinae
- Genus: Dawkinsia
- Species: D. rohani

Binomial name
- Dawkinsia rohani (Rema Devi, Indra & Knight, 2010)

Synonyms
- Puntius rohani Rema Devi, Indra & Knight, 2010

= Dawkinsia rohani =

Species of fish

Dawkinsia rohani is a species of ray-finned fish in the genus Dawkinsia. It is endemic to the Western Ghats and inhabits the hill streams of Kanyakumari District in Tamil Nadu draining into the Arabian Sea.

== Etymology ==
The fish is named in honor of Rohan Pethiyagoda (b. 1955), in recognition of his work on the freshwater fishes of India and Sri Lanka.
