= Rattota =

Rattota රත්තොට ரத்தோட்டை
- Town
- Location within Sri Lanka
- Coordinates: 7°31′11.6″N 80°40′37″E
- Country: Sri Lanka
- Province: Central Province
- Elevation: 1,250 ft (381 m)
- Time zone: UTC+5:30 (Sri Lanka Standard Time)

Rattota is a town in Sri Lanka, located within Matale District, Central Province. The population of the town, according to the 2012 census, was 1,761.

== Local Government Council ==
Rattota is governed by the Rattota Pradeshiya Sabha.

== Banks ==
There are two public banks operating in Rattota.

== In biology ==
The two jumping spiders known as Marengo rattotensis and Onomastus rattotensis was discovered from this area, hence specific name.

== See also ==
- List of towns in Central Province, Sri Lanka
