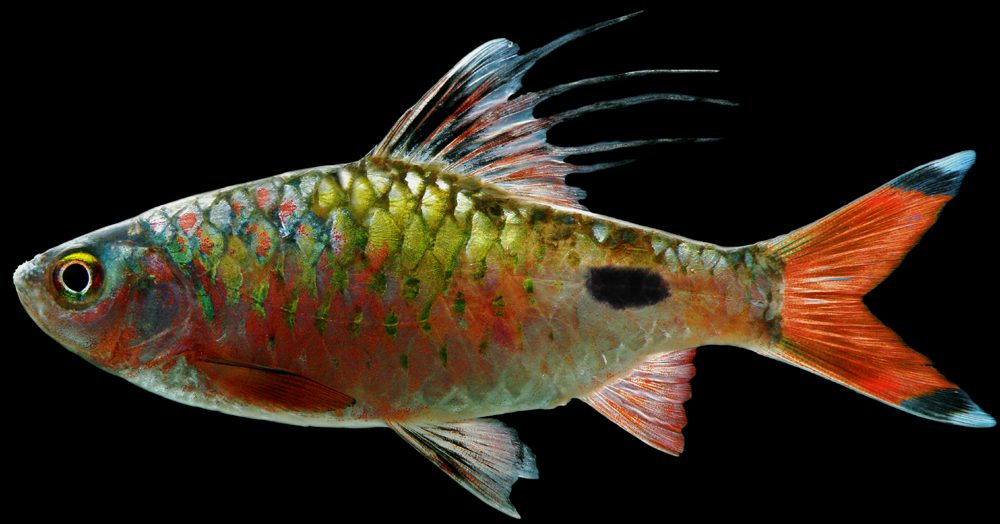

Conservation status
- Least Concern (IUCN 3.1)

Scientific classification
- Kingdom: Animalia
- Phylum: Chordata
- Class: Actinopterygii
- Order: Cypriniformes
- Family: Cyprinidae
- Subfamily: Smiliogastrinae
- Genus: Dawkinsia
- Species: D. filamentosa

Binomial name
- Dawkinsia filamentosa (Valenciennes, 1844)

Synonyms
- Barbus filamentosa (Valenciennes, 1844); Barbus filamentosus (Valenciennes, 1844); Leuciscus filamentosus Valenciennes, 1844; Puntius filamentosus (Valenciennes, 1844); Systomus filamentosus (Valenciennes, 1844); Systomus maderaspatensis Jerdon, 1849; Systomus madraspatensis Jerdon, 1849

= Dawkinsia filamentosa =

Species of fish

Dawkinsia filamentosa, the filament barb, or poovali paral is a species of barb. Young fish have barely any color and black spots. They start having more color at three months old. The fish is a swift swimmer. Males are larger than females and they fertilize eggs by swimming into the cloud of eggs. The species is most commonly found in coastal floodplains near the Southwest Indian states of Kerala, Tamil Nadu and Karnataka. This species is also known as blackspot barb.

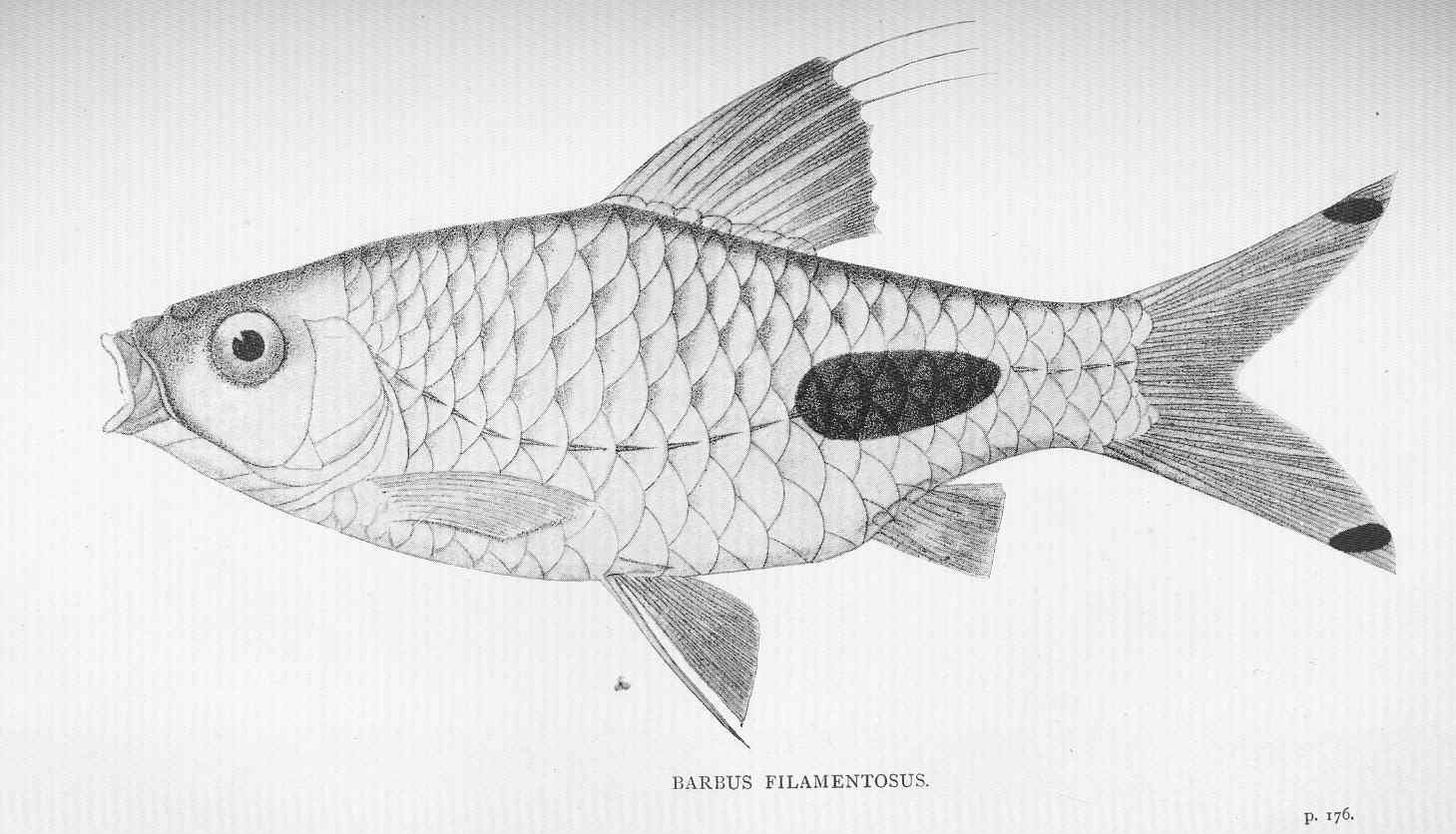

== Etymology ==
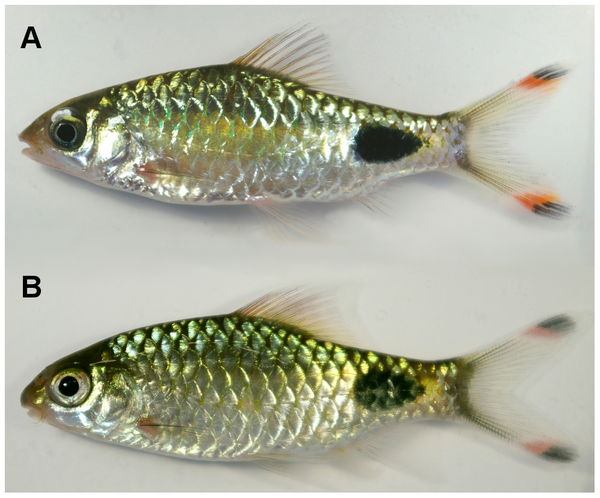

Its generic name, Dawkinsia, is named after renowned British evolutionary biologist Richard Dawkins, for "his contribution to the public understanding of science and, in particular, of evolutionary science".

== Diagnosis ==
Adults differ from all other South Asian Puntius by a combination of the following characters:

branched dorsal-fin rays prolonged into filament-like extensions in adult males only; a black band about as wide as the eye near tip of each caudal-fin lobe; lower lip continuous; a caudal blotch on 2-5 scales, commencing posterior to anal-fin origin; no distinct markings on body in advance of anal-fin origin. Distinguished from D. assimilis by Possessing a subterminal mouth (vs. Inferior); maxillary barbels shorter, 0.5-2.2 of SL % (vs. 5.5-9.3%); post-orbital head length 11.0-12.1% of SL (vs. 8.7-10.4%); and interorbital width 11.2-12.2% of SL (vs. 10.0-11.1%) . Description: Pectoral fin with one simple and 14 or 15 branched rays. Lateral line with 18,19 or 20 scales on body, extending 1-3 scales on to caudal-fin base.

== Distribution ==
Endemic to but widespread within the Western Ghats mountains region of southern India in the states of Kerala, Tamil Nadu and possibly restricted to the south of the Karnataka.

Type locality is 'Alleppey', also known as Alappuzha, situated between Vembanad Lake and the Arabian Sea, Kerala state, southwestern India

== Habitat ==
According to Pethiyagoda and Kottelat (2005) this species is most common in lowland coastal floodplains. It is found in both fresh and brackish waters of rivers, estuaries, coastal marshes and reservoirs.

== Fishing ==
Along the rivers of Kerala, these fishes grow in abundance and due to its high diet of worms and insects, they are easily caught with baits by fishermen especially during the monsoon season when they are more widely found.

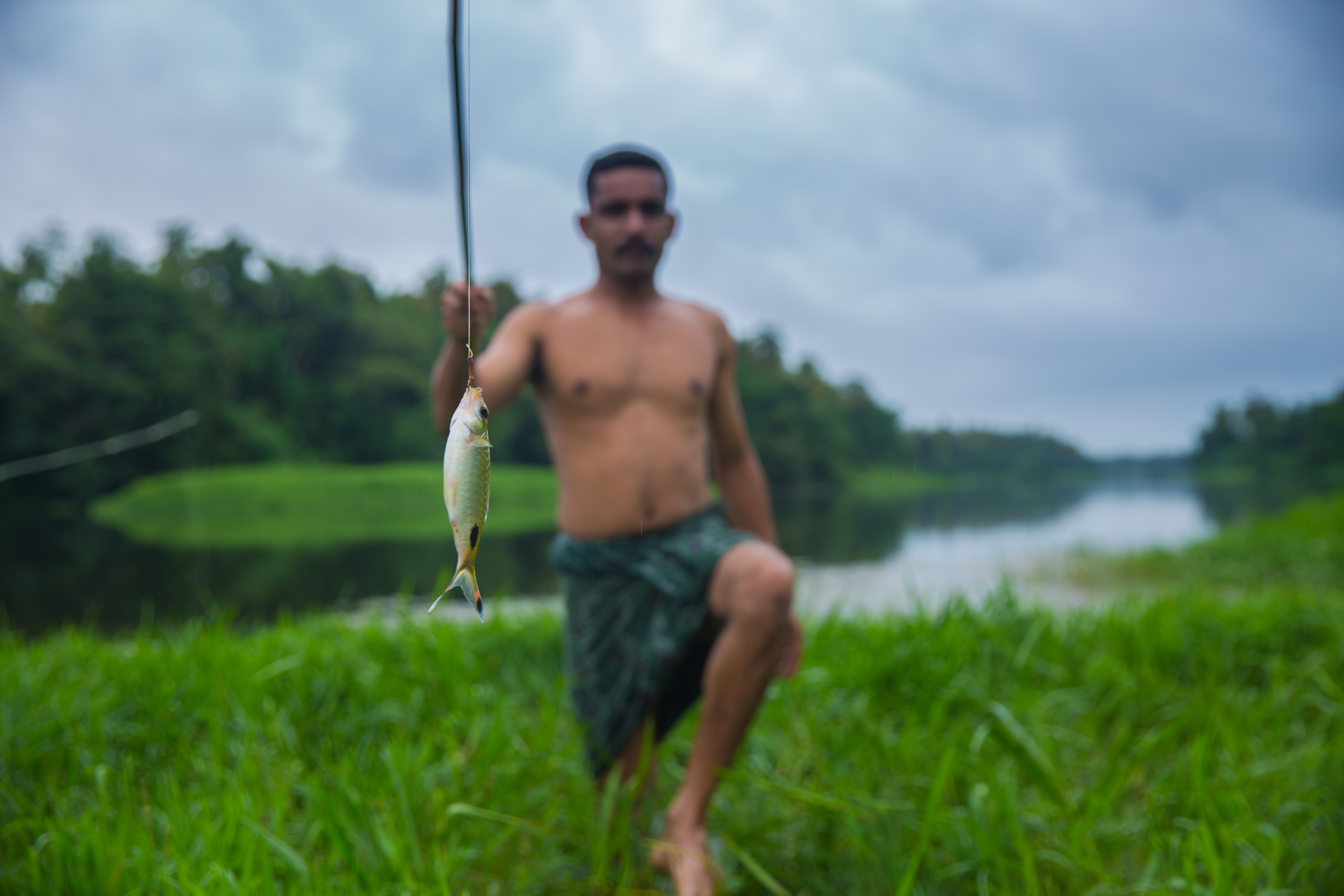
Fisherman with his catch of the commonly found Paral Fish from the Chalakudy River

== Local folklore ==
The Nadanpattu (local song) "Aa Paralu Ee Paralu" introduced by Kalabhavan Mani mentions the Poovali Paral multiple times and it was added due it's striking features.
