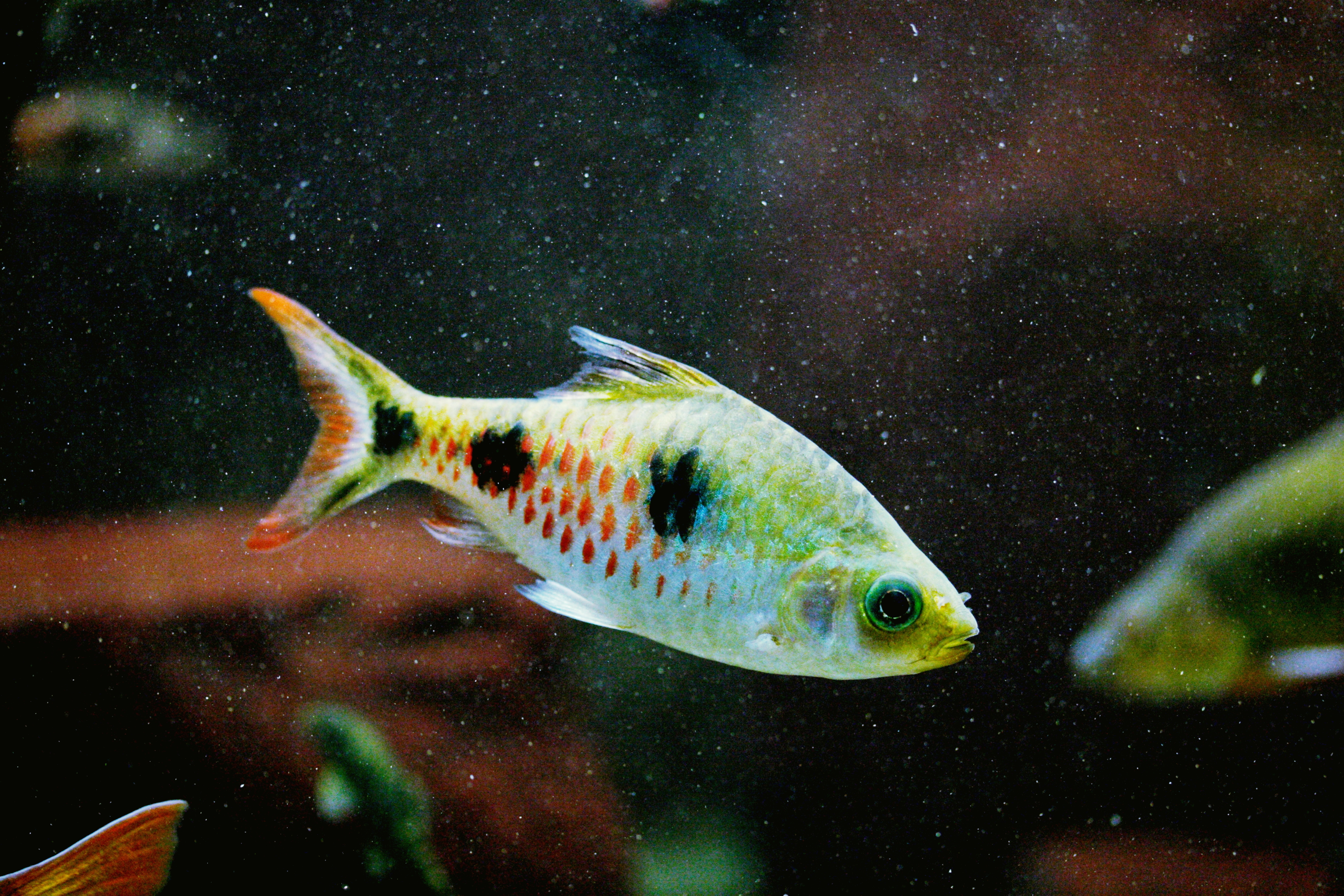

Scientific classification
- Domain: Eukaryota
- Kingdom: Animalia
- Phylum: Chordata
- Class: Actinopterygii
- Order: Cypriniformes
- Family: Cyprinidae
- Subfamily: Smiliogastrinae
- Genus: Dawkinsia
- Species: D. rubrotincta

Binomial name
- Dawkinsia rubrotincta (Jerdon, 1849)

Synonyms
- Puntius rubrotinctus (Jerdon 1849)

= Dawkinsia rubrotincta =

Species of fish

Dawkinsia rubrotincta is a species of barb native to the Kaveri river basin in southern India.
