= Marengo inornata =

Scientific classification
- Kingdom: Animalia
- Phylum: Arthropoda
- Subphylum: Chelicerata
- Class: Arachnida
- Order: Araneae
- Infraorder: Araneomorphae
- Family: Salticidae
- Genus: Marengo
- Species: M. inornata

Binomial name
- Marengo inornata (Simon, 1900)

Synonyms
- Philates inornatus Simon, 1900

Species of spider

Marengo inornata, is a species of spider of the genus Marengo. It is endemic to Sri Lanka.
