= Onomastus pethiyagodai =

Scientific classification
- Kingdom: Animalia
- Phylum: Arthropoda
- Subphylum: Chelicerata
- Class: Arachnida
- Order: Araneae
- Infraorder: Araneomorphae
- Family: Salticidae
- Genus: Onomastus
- Species: O. pethiyagodai

Binomial name
- Onomastus pethiyagodai Benjamin, 2010

Species of spider

Onomastus pethiyagodai, is a species of spider of the genus Onomastus. It is endemic to Sri Lanka. The specific name pethiyagodai is for in honor of Sri Lanka's one of leading zoologist Dr. Rohan Pethiyagoda.
