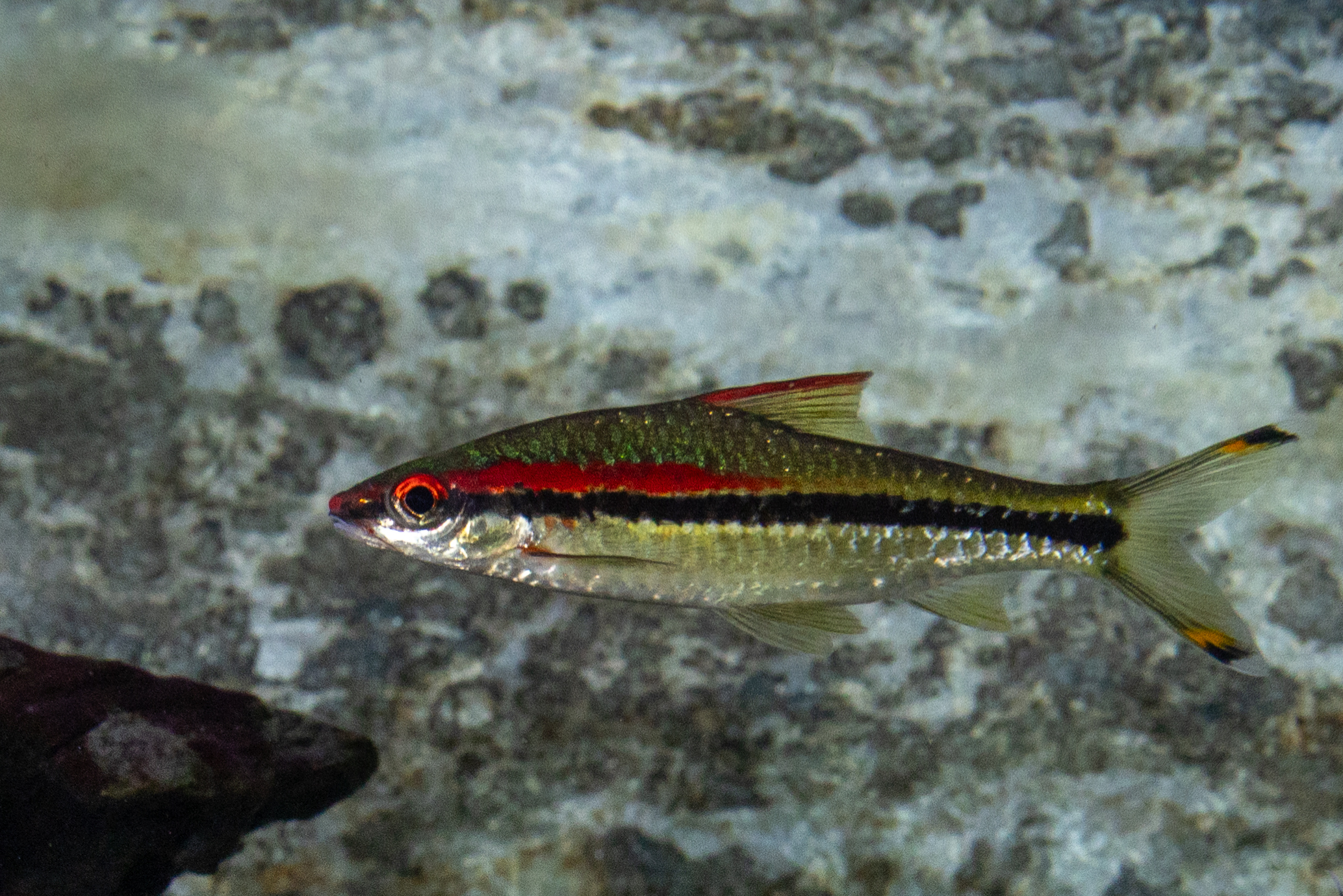

Conservation status
- Endangered (IUCN 3.1)

Scientific classification
- Kingdom: Animalia
- Phylum: Chordata
- Class: Actinopterygii
- Division: Teleostei
- Order: Cypriniformes
- Family: Cyprinidae
- Genus: Dawkinsia
- Species: D. denisonii

Binomial name
- Dawkinsia denisonii (F. Day, 1865)

Synonyms
- Labeo denisonii F. Day, 1865; Barbus denisonii (F. Day, 1865); Crossocheilus denisonii (F. Day, 1865); Puntius denisonii (F. Day, 1865); Sahyadria denisonii (F. Day, 1865)

= Denison barb =

Species of fish

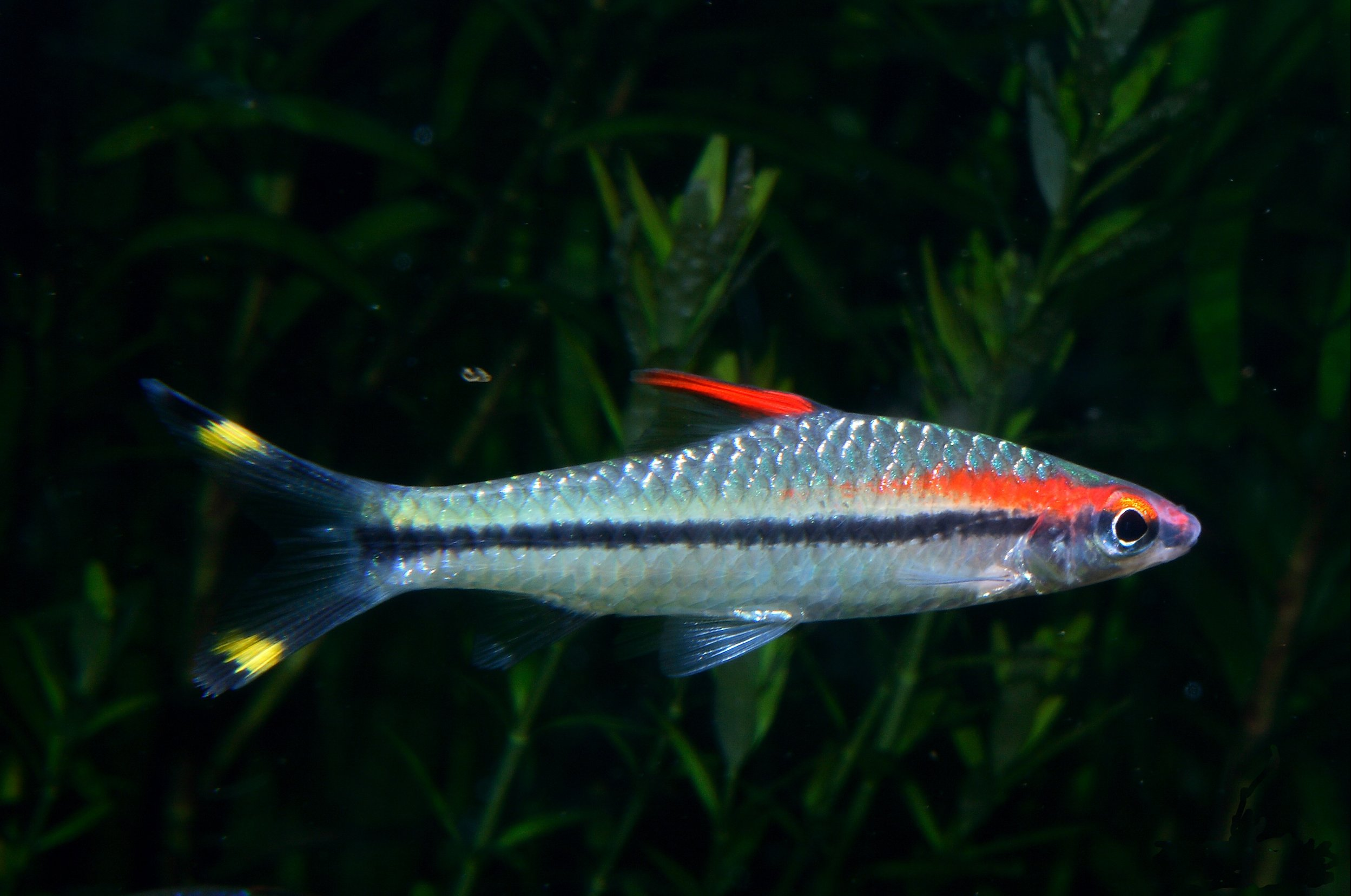

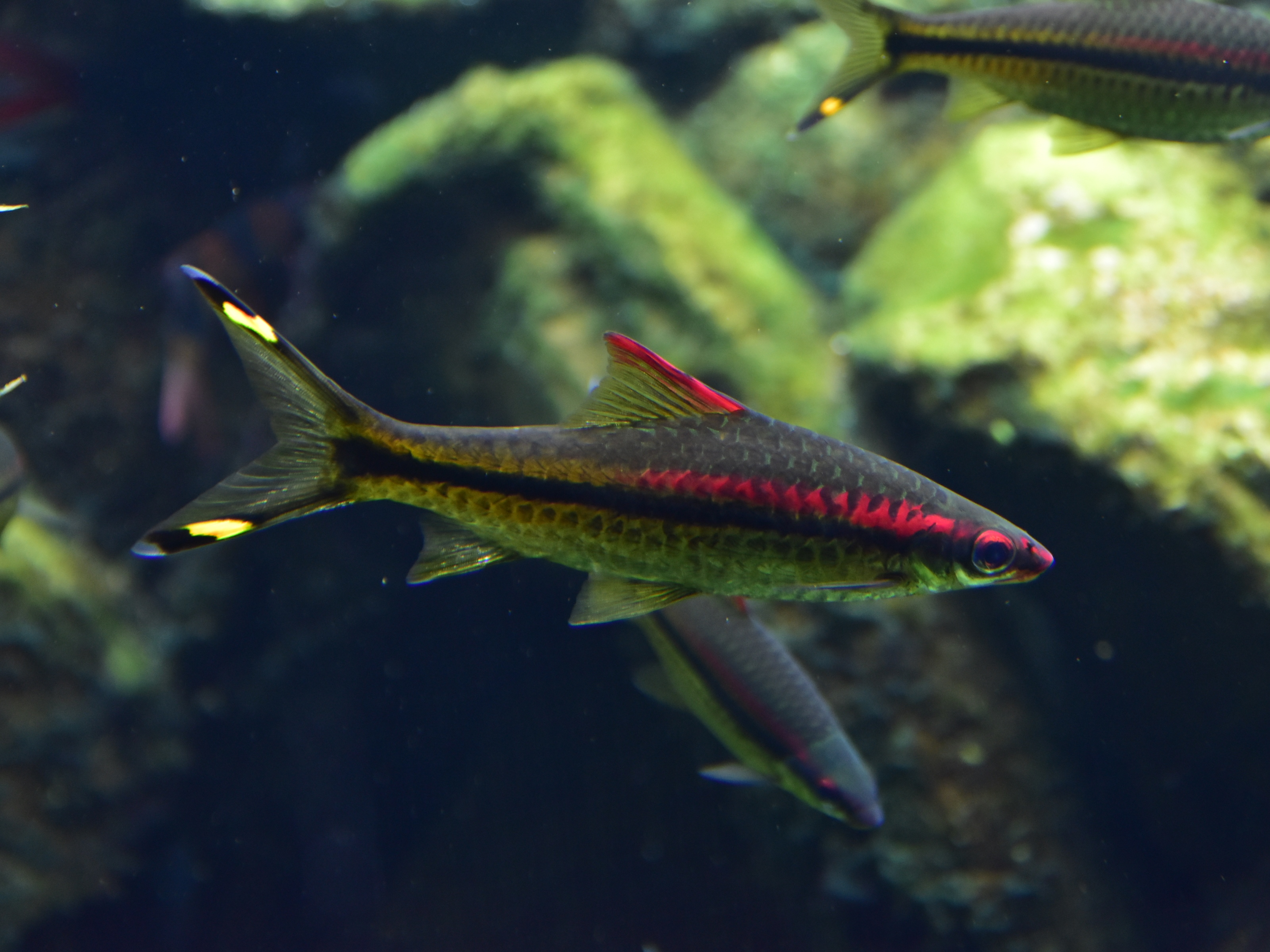

The Denison barb, Denison's barb, Miss Kerala, red-line torpedo barb, or roseline shark (Dawkinsia denisonii) is an endangered species of cyprinid fish endemic to the fast-flowing hill streams and rivers of the Western Ghats in India. It is commonly seen in the aquarium trade; pet collection caused it to become endangered and is its single major threat.

== Physical characteristics ==
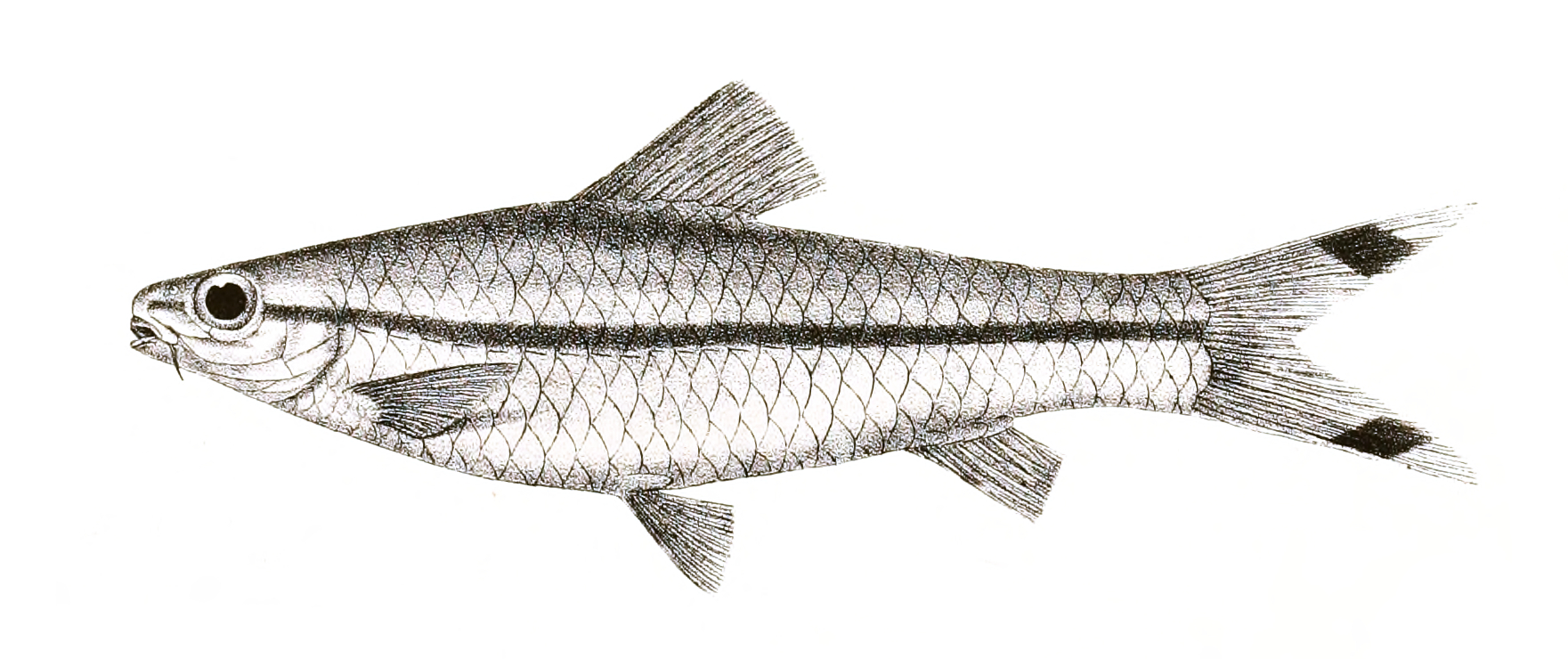

The fish is characterized by a torpedo-shaped body with silver scales, a red line running from their snout, through the eye, back towards the middle of the body; and below the red line, a black line that runs the length of the fish to the tail. As they mature, a distinctive green/blue marking on top of the head develops. This species reputedly reaches a length of 15 centimetres (5.9 in) TL, but typically will only reach 9–11 centimetres (3.5–4.3 in). They are active shoaling fishes.

The species was described by Francis Day and named after Sir William Denison.

== Habitat and threats ==
Denison barb is endemic to the Achankovil, Pamba and Chaliyar rivers. Specifically, they are found in four locations — Cheenkannipuzha (a major tributary of Valapattanam River), the Achankovil river, the Chaliyar river and near Mundakayam town. The species has an estimated range of 8,805 km^{2} (3,400 sq mi). S. denisonii is a benthopelagic species that is gregarious and shoals are known to occur in rocky pools with thick vegetation along their banks. They thrive in a subtropical climate in water with a 6.8–7.8 pH, a water hardness of 5–25 dGH and a temperature range of 65 to 79 °F (18 to 26 °C).

As reported by Practical Fishkeeping in January 2009, new research by team of scientists from India suggests that the species is being over-exploited for the aquarium trade, potentially placing it at risk of extinction. In spite of being listed as endangered by local assessment reports the fish had been promoted as an 'export item' by several government agencies. The population structure, age, growth, mortality and harvest intensity in the Valapattanam River was studied and suggests that the species is being over-exploited.

The fish was most likely collected and exported out of India in 1996. In 1997, it won the third prize at 'Aquarama 1997' (world exhibition on Ornamental fish) under the 'New Species Category'. By 2007–08 it constituted about 60–65% of the total live ornamental fish exported from India which was worth US$1.54 million. Though the Government of Kerala banned the fishing and export of the endangered barb, it is yet to be listed under the National Wildlife Protection Act. The golden form of this Denison barb is extinct from the wild but few Aquarium hobbyists have it in their collection.

== In the aquarium ==
This fish is a relatively new addition to the fish keeping hobby. The Denison's barb is a schooling fish that is usually kept in groups. It tends to be peaceful but some have been known to be slightly aggressive around food, especially if the tank is smaller than what is required. They eat bloodworms, shrimp, meat, fish flake and some vegetation. A similar fish, Dawkinsia chalakkudiensis is sometimes confused with this fish, but it is a larger, less colourful and a more aggressive species.

== Breeding ==
Over the years many efforts have been made to breed this rapidly depleting species in captivity, initially with limited success. In 2009, success came from the work carried out at the Fisheries College, Kerala by Bony Joseph. Breeding efforts have also been carried out by Chester Zoo and two amateur fish-lovers from Chennai (India), Venkatesh and Murali. These efforts may pave the way for standardizing the process and would be a major boost to conservation and the ornamental fish trade in India. Large numbers are now being bred in captivity at commercial facilities.

== See also ==
- List of freshwater aquarium fish species
