= Onomastus rattotensis =

Scientific classification
- Kingdom: Animalia
- Phylum: Arthropoda
- Subphylum: Chelicerata
- Class: Arachnida
- Order: Araneae
- Infraorder: Araneomorphae
- Family: Salticidae
- Genus: Onomastus
- Species: O. rattotensis

Binomial name
- Onomastus rattotensis Benjamin, 2010

Species of spider

Onomastus rattotensis is a species of spider of the genus Onomastus. It is endemic to Sri Lanka. The species was first discovered from Rattota area of Matale District, hence the specific name.
