= Onomastus nigricaudus =

Scientific classification
- Kingdom: Animalia
- Phylum: Arthropoda
- Subphylum: Chelicerata
- Class: Arachnida
- Order: Araneae
- Infraorder: Araneomorphae
- Family: Salticidae
- Genus: Onomastus
- Species: O. nigricaudus

Binomial name
- Onomastus nigricaudus Simon, 1900

Species of spider

Onomastus nigricaudus is a species of spider of the genus Onomastus. It is endemic to Sri Lanka.
