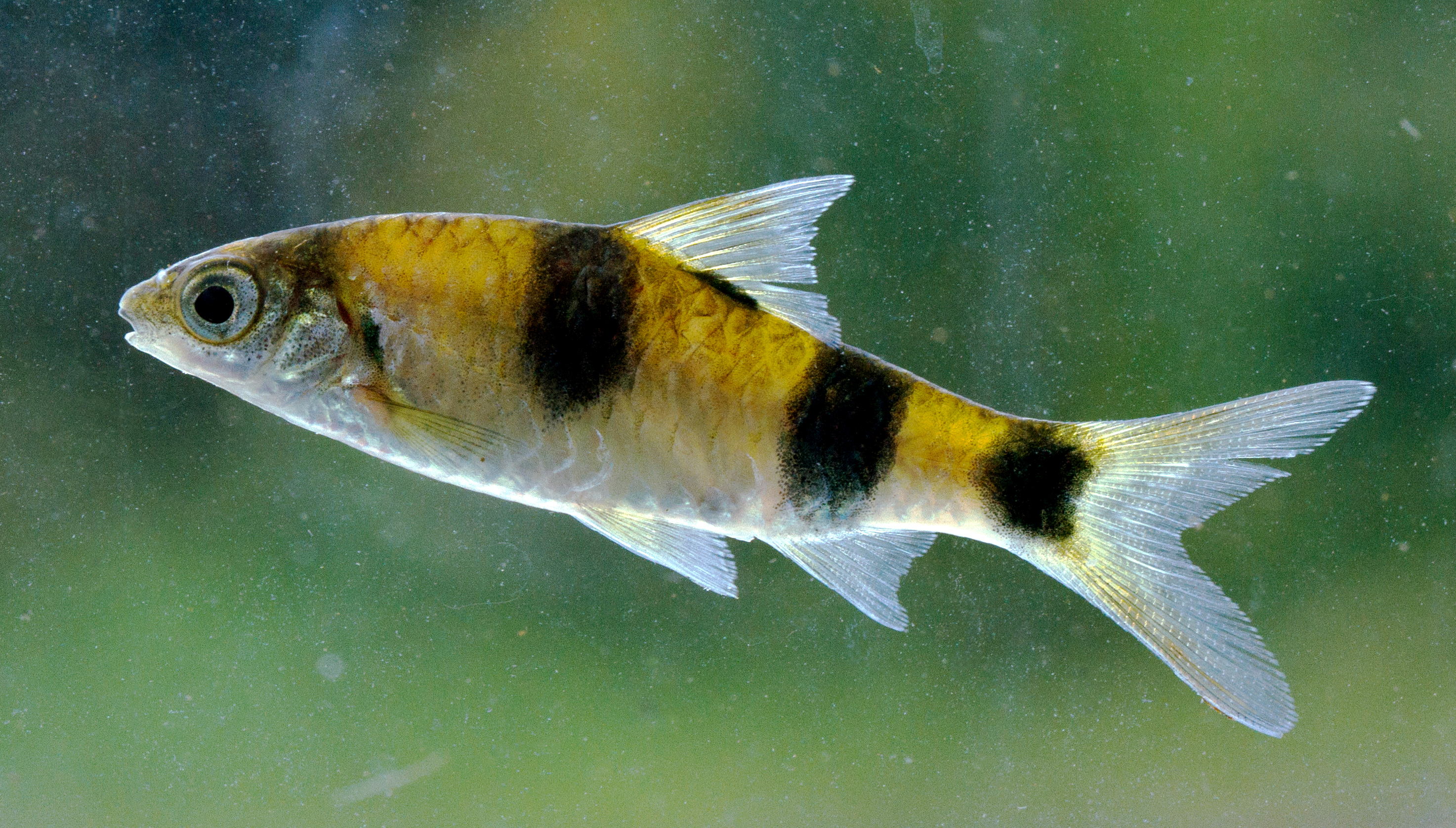

Conservation status
- Endangered (IUCN 3.1)

Scientific classification
- Kingdom: Animalia
- Phylum: Chordata
- Class: Actinopterygii
- Order: Cypriniformes
- Family: Cyprinidae
- Subfamily: Smiliogastrinae
- Genus: Dawkinsia
- Species: D. srilankensis

Binomial name
- Dawkinsia srilankensis (Senanayake, 1985)

Synonyms
- Barbus srilankensis Senanayake 1985; Puntius srilankensis (Senanayake 1985)

= Dawkinsia srilankensis =

Species of fish

Dawkinsia srilankensis, the blotched filamented barb, is a species of ray-finned fish in the genus Dawkinsia. This species is endemic to the Kalu River in Sri Lanka and it is in imminent danger of going extinct due to tailings from upstream mines and potentially also capture for the aquarium trade. It was bred recently in the Dehiwala Zoological Gardens.
