= Onomastus maskeliya =

Scientific classification
- Kingdom: Animalia
- Phylum: Arthropoda
- Subphylum: Chelicerata
- Class: Arachnida
- Order: Araneae
- Infraorder: Araneomorphae
- Family: Salticidae
- Genus: Onomastus
- Species: O. maskeliya

Binomial name
- Onomastus maskeliya Benjamin & Kanesharatnam, 2016

Species of spider

Onomastus maskeliya, is a species of spider of the genus Onomastus. It is endemic to Sri Lanka. Onomastus maskeliya inhabits high altitude cloud forests, as a result, its distribution is limited.
