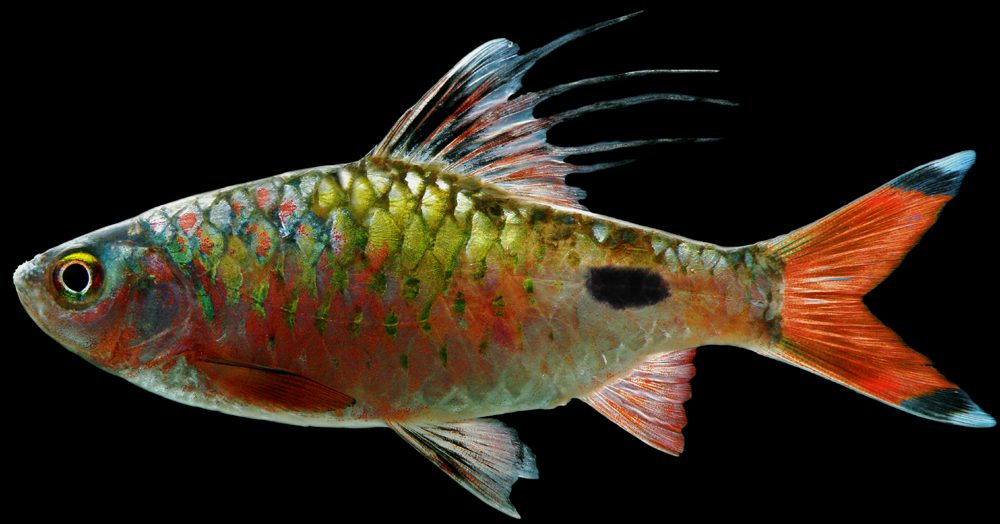
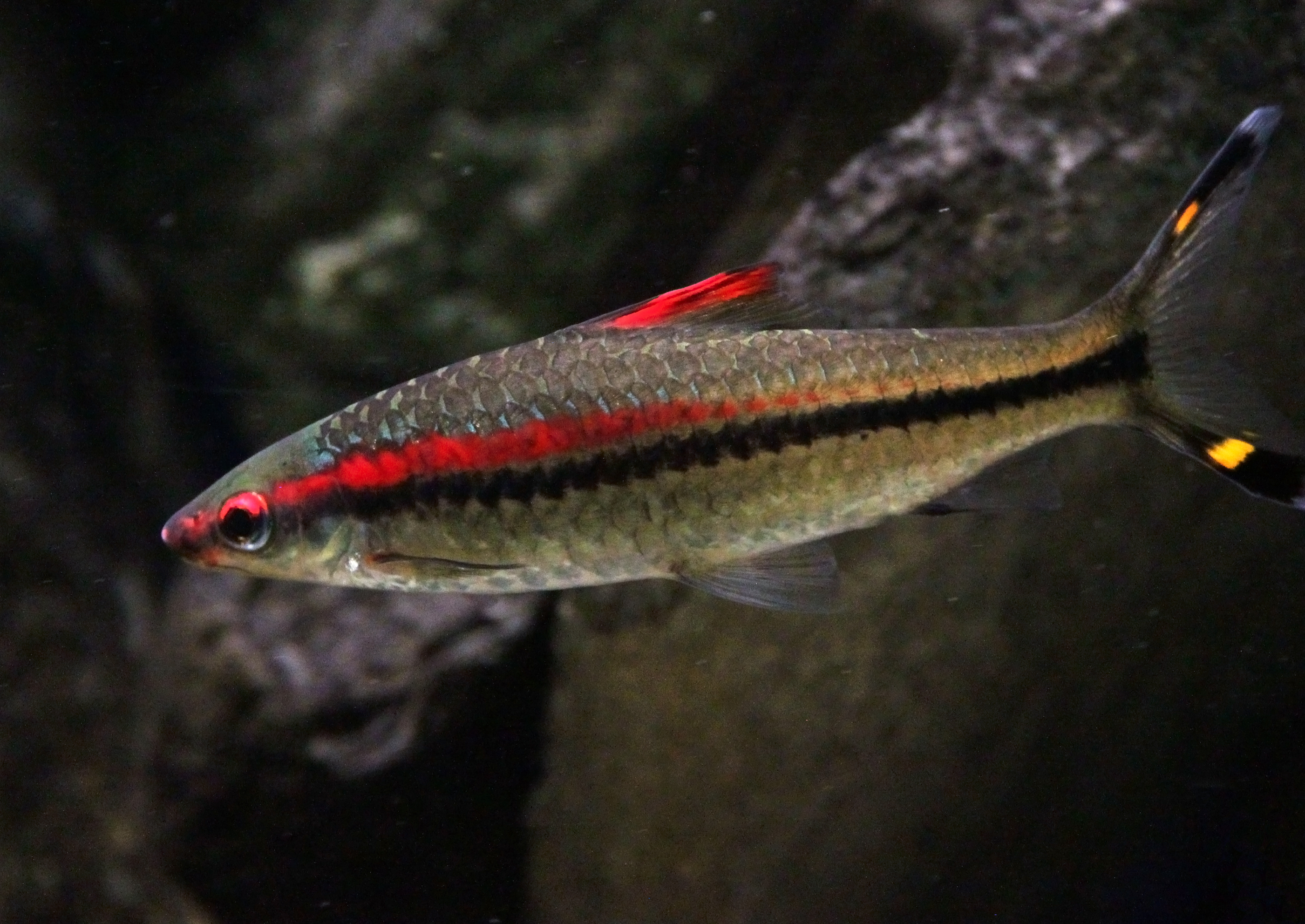
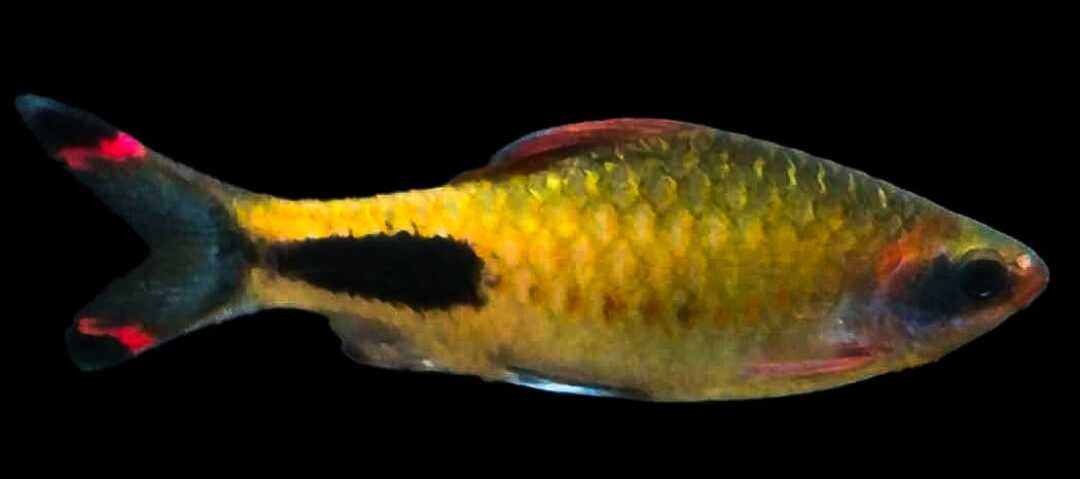
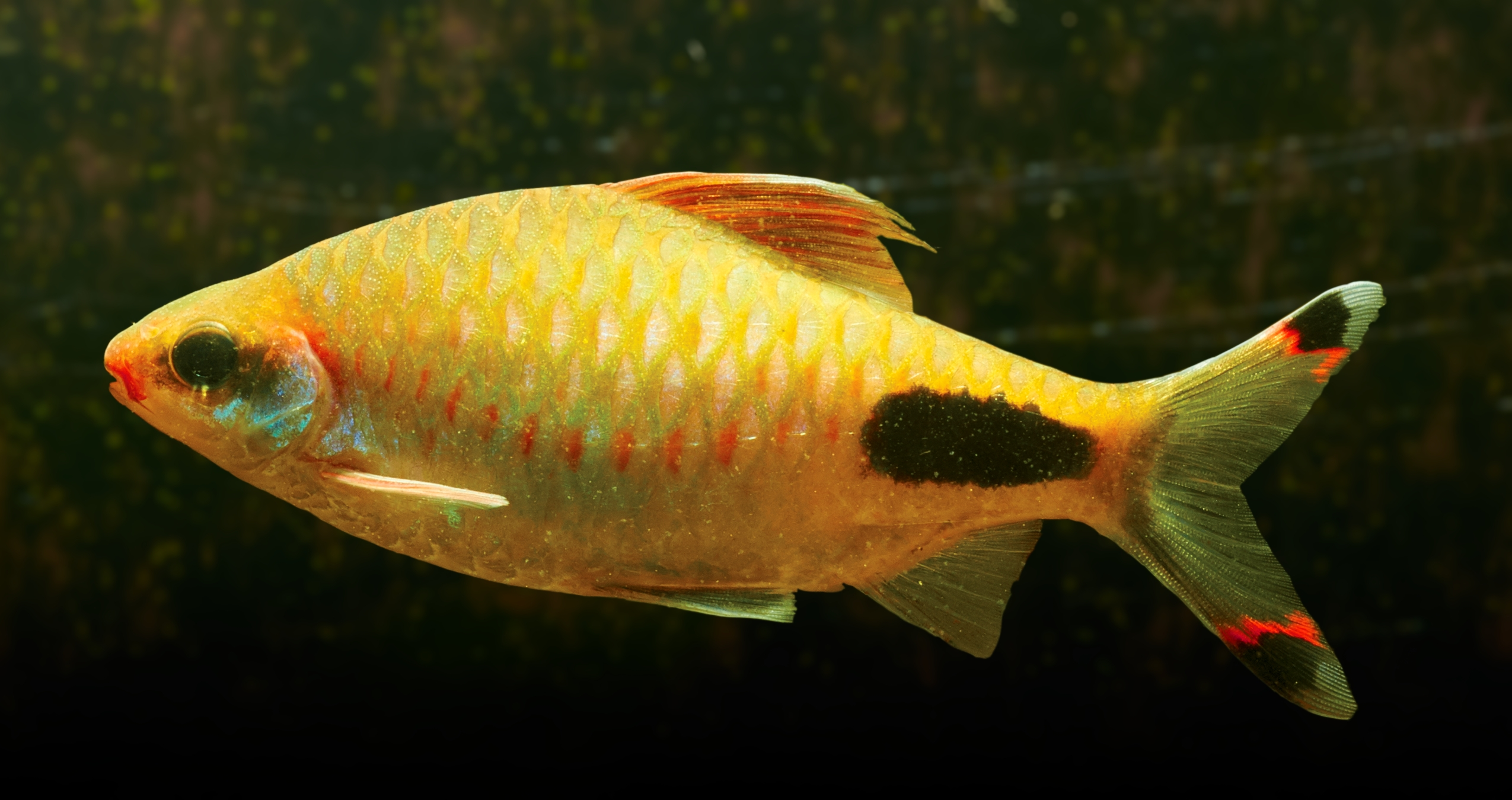
- Dawkinsia filamentosa Dawkinsia denisonii Dawkinsia apsara Dawkinsia assimilis

Scientific classification
- Kingdom: Animalia
- Phylum: Chordata
- Class: Actinopterygii
- Order: Cypriniformes
- Family: Cyprinidae
- Subfamily: Smiliogastrinae
- Genus: Dawkinsia; Pethiyagoda, Meegaskumbura & Maduwage, 2012

Type species
- Leuciscus filamentosus Valenciennes, 1844

Synonyms
- Sahyadria Raghavan, Philip, Ali & Dahanukar, 2013

= Dawkinsia =

Genus of fishes

Dawkinsia is a genus of cyprinid fishes from freshwater in South India and Sri Lanka. It was split off (i.e., reclassified) from genus Puntius in 2012. The genus is endemic to South Asia; most species are found in the Western Ghats, with one inhabiting the Knuckles Hills of Sri Lanka. The Sri Lankan species colonized the island by crossing the Palk Isthmus (now the Palk Strait) during the Pliocene-Late Pleistocene.

== Etymology ==
Dawkinsia is named after the evolutionary biologist Richard Dawkins in recognition of his "contribution to the public understanding of science, particularly, of evolutionary science". Dawkins describes this as "a great honour".

The synonym Sahyadria alludes to the local name of the Western Ghats, Sahayadri, where the two species of that group are found.

== Description ==
Adults typically measure 8–12 cm (3.1–4.7 in) SL. They do not have rostral barbels but may have maxillary barbels. Juveniles have a colour pattern consisting of three black bars on body; this persists in the adults of some species. Adults have a black, horizontally elongate blotch on the caudal peduncle. The last unbranched fin-ray of the dorsal fin is smooth and the lateral line is complete, with 18 to 22 scales.

Three species groups can be distinguished: Filamentosa, Sahyadria, and Assimilis, though this is mostly based on molecular analyses; the Filamentosa and Assimilis group have plesiomorphies, shared features that the Sahyadria group do not possess, such as the extensions of the dorsal fin rays past the membrane. All three groups do, however, share the juvenile barred patterning.

== Species ==
These are the currently recognized species in this genus:

- Dawkinsia apsara (Katwate, Marcus Knight, Anoop, Raghavan & Dahanukar, 2020) (mascara barb)
- Dawkinsia arulius (Jerdon, 1849) (Arulius barb)
- Dawkinsia assimilis (Jerdon, 1849)
- Dawkinsia austellus Katwate, Marcus Knight, Anoop, Raghavan & Dahanukar, 2020
- Dawkinsia chalakkudiensis (Menon, Rema Devi & Thobias, 1999)
- Dawkinsia crassa Katwate, Marcus Knight, Anoop, Raghavan & Dahanukar, 2020 (Rounded filament barb)
- Dawkinsia denisonii (F. Day, 1865) (Denison barb; red line torpedo barb)
- Dawkinsia exclamatio (Pethiyagoda & Kottelat, 2005)
- Dawkinsia filamentosa (Valenciennes, 1844) (Blackspot/Filament barb)
- Dawkinsia lepida (Day, 1868)
- Dawkinsia rohani (Rema Devi, Indra & Knight, 2010)
- Dawkinsia rubrotincta (Jerdon, 1849)
- Dawkinsia singhala (Duncker, 1912)
- Dawkinsia srilankensis (Senanayake, 1985) (Blotched filamented barb)
- Dawkinsia tambraparniei (Silas, 1954)
- Dawkinsia uttara Katwate, Apte & Raghavan, 2020

Phylogenetic analyses continually suggested that Dawkinsia was paraphyletic if Sahyadria were considered a distinct genus, so the two species of Sahyadria, Sahyadria denisonii and S. chalakkudiensis, were lumped into Dawkinsia. The following cladogram is based on a Bayesian inference of the concatenated mitochondrial dataset of the cyt b + cox1 (1719 bp) gene:

- - Rohtee ogilbii
  - Osteobrama belangeri
- Dawkinsia
  - Assimilis group
    - - Dawkinsia lepida
      - - Dawkinsia apsara
        - Dawkinsia assimilis
    - Dawkinsia austellus
  - - "Sahyadria"
    - Filamentosa group
      - - - - - Dawkinsia filamentosa
                ⊞Show sample locales
                ⊟
                - - - - Sri Lanka
                      - Kerala
                    - Karnataka
                    - Maharashtra
                    - Goa
                  - Tamil Nadu
                - Kerala
            - Dawkinsia uttara
          - - Dawkinsia crassa
            - - Dawkinsia rohani
              - Dawkinsia exclamatio
        - - Dawkinsia srilankensis
          - Dawkinsia tambraparniei
      - - Dawkinsia arulius
        - Dawkinsia rubrotincta

Mitogenome analysis confirms that D. denisonii and D. chalakkudiensis are sister species; they comprise the Sahyadria group.
