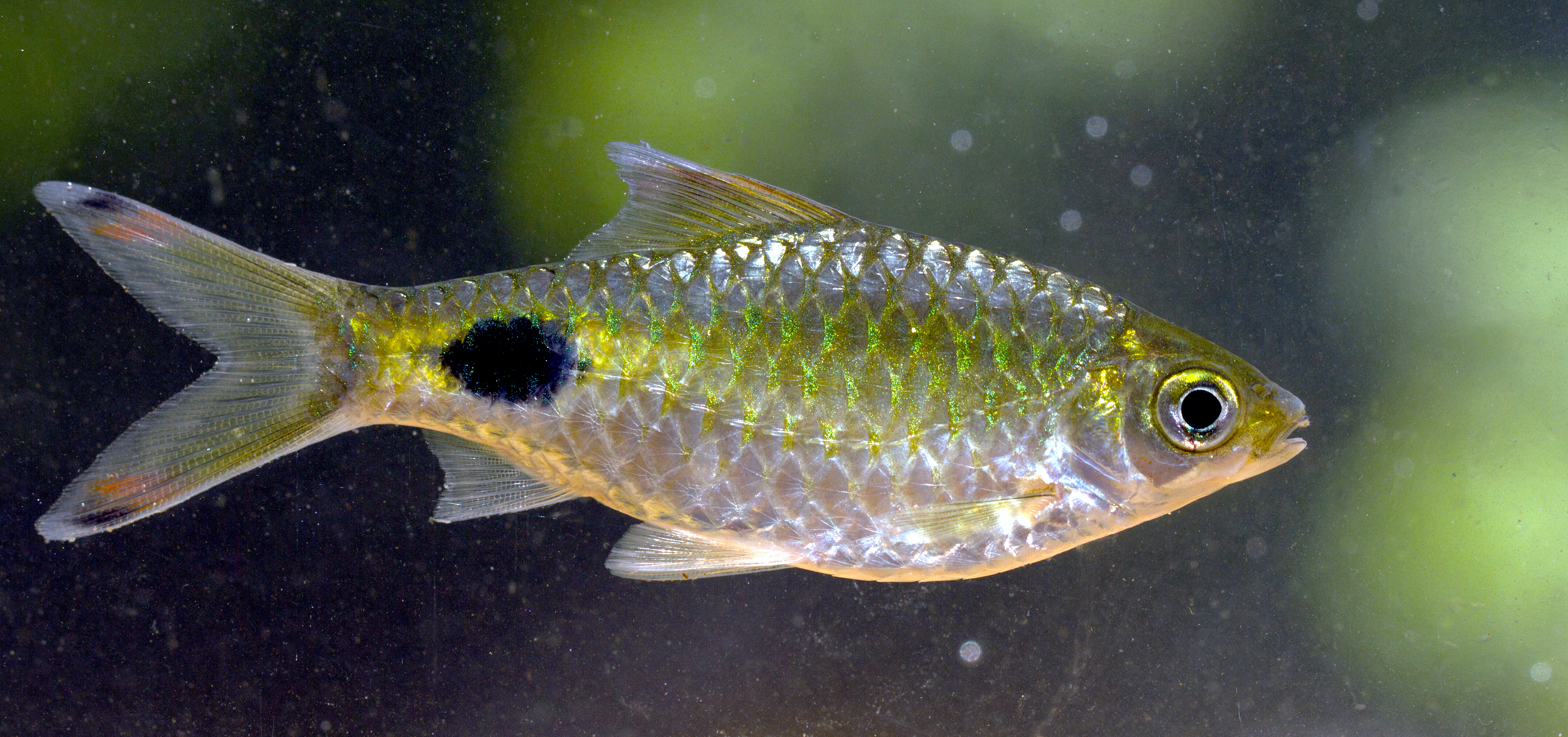

Scientific classification
- Kingdom: Animalia
- Phylum: Chordata
- Class: Actinopterygii
- Order: Cypriniformes
- Family: Cyprinidae
- Subfamily: Smiliogastrinae
- Genus: Dawkinsia
- Species: D. singhala

Binomial name
- Dawkinsia singhala (Duncker, 1912)

Synonyms
- Barbus singhala Duncker, 1912; Puntius singhala (Duncker, 1912)

= Dawkinsia singhala =

Species of fish

Dawkinsia singhala is a species of ray-finned fish in the genus Dawkinsia. It is found in Sri Lanka. The genus Dawkinsia is named after evolutionary biologist Richard Dawkins.
