= Marengo nitida =

Scientific classification
- Kingdom: Animalia
- Phylum: Arthropoda
- Subphylum: Chelicerata
- Class: Arachnida
- Order: Araneae
- Infraorder: Araneomorphae
- Family: Salticidae
- Genus: Marengo
- Species: M. nitida

Binomial name
- Marengo nitida Simon, 1900

Species of spider

Marengo nitida is a species of jumping spider that is a member of the Marengo genus. It is endemic to Sri Lanka, being first discovered in 1900 by French arachnologist Eugène Simon. The spider is distinguished from other members of the Marengo genus by the round shape of its opisthosoma. It is an active predator that relies on its vision and agility.
