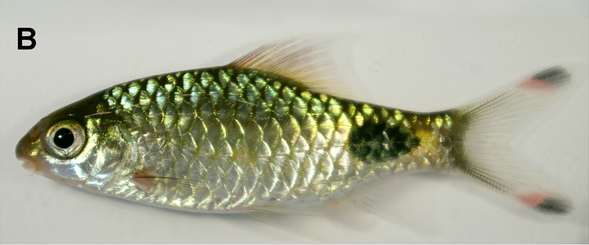

Conservation status
- Vulnerable (IUCN 3.1)

Scientific classification
- Kingdom: Animalia
- Phylum: Chordata
- Class: Actinopterygii
- Order: Cypriniformes
- Family: Cyprinidae
- Subfamily: Smiliogastrinae
- Genus: Dawkinsia
- Species: D. assimilis

Binomial name
- Dawkinsia assimilis (Jerdon, 1849)

Synonyms
- Systomus assimilis Jerdon, 1849; Puntius assimilis (Jerdon, 1849); Puntius lepidus Day, 1868

= Dawkinsia assimilis =

Species of fish

Dawkinsia assimilis is a species of ray-finned fish in the genus Dawkinsia. It is endemic to the southern Western Ghats especially to the Southwest Indian states of Karnataka and Kerala. They are known as Mascara Barb. Filament barbs are a group of small freshwater fishes found in the rivers of peninsular India and Sri Lanka. There are nine species known under the genus Dawkinsia. These barbs are popular among aquarium hobbyists as an ornamental fish and are also collected from rivers and bred for trade.

== Distribution ==
The precise extent of its distribution remains unclear. It has been collected from the Netravati, Chalakudy and Kallada river basins in recent years.

== Description ==
Adults measure up to 4.7".
