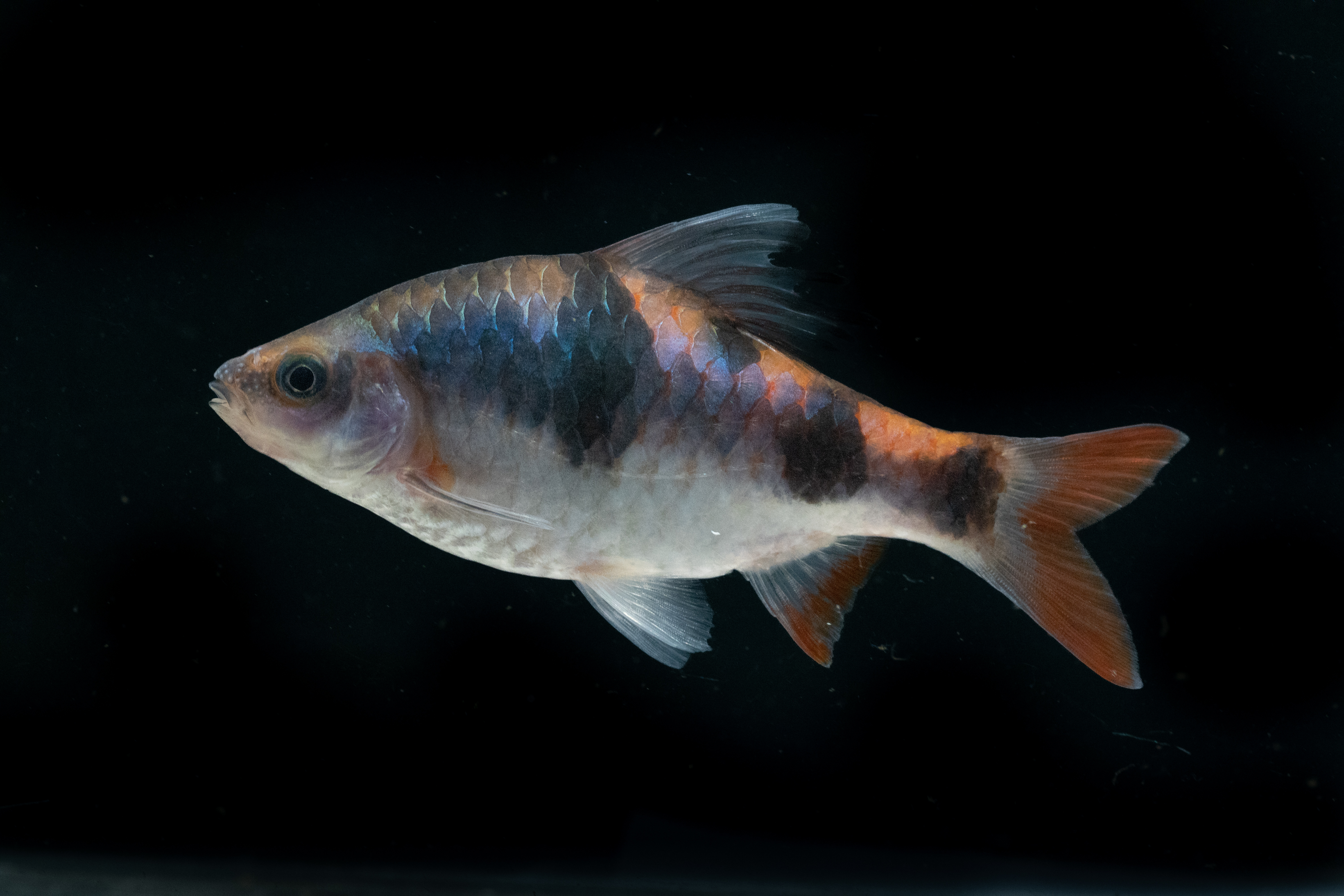

Conservation status
- Endangered (IUCN 3.1)

Scientific classification
- Kingdom: Animalia
- Phylum: Chordata
- Class: Actinopterygii
- Order: Cypriniformes
- Family: Cyprinidae
- Subfamily: Smiliogastrinae
- Genus: Dawkinsia
- Species: D. tambraparniei

Binomial name
- Dawkinsia tambraparniei (Silas, 1954)

Synonyms
- Puntius arulius tambraparniei Silas, 1954; Puntius tambraparniei Silas, 1954

= Dawkinsia tambraparniei =

Species of fish

Dawkinsia tambraparniei is a species of cyprinid fish found in the Tambraparni River basin in the Western Ghats, Tamil Nadu, India. This species can reach a length of 12.8 centimetres (5.0 in) SL.

== Taxonomy ==
Dawkinsia tambraparniei was originally described as the subspecies Puntius arulius tambraparniei from the Tamiraparani River by E.G. Silas in 1953. This species was later classified under the new genus Dawkinisia.

== Threats ==
This species population has significantly decreased in recent years due to human activities such as sand mining.
