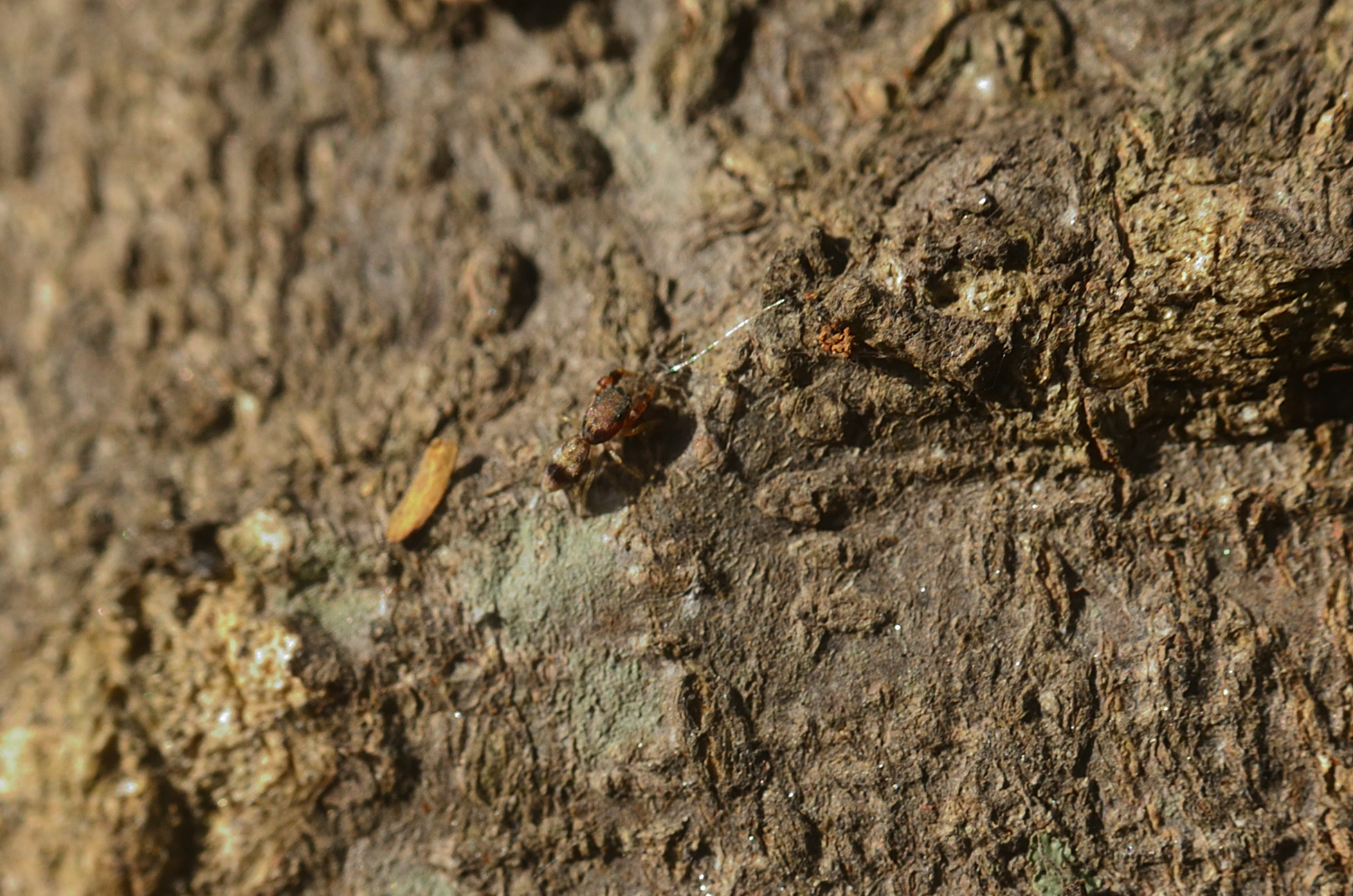
- Marengo sp. from Saul Kere, Bengaluru, Karnataka, India.

Scientific classification
- Kingdom: Animalia
- Phylum: Arthropoda
- Subphylum: Chelicerata
- Class: Arachnida
- Order: Araneae
- Infraorder: Araneomorphae
- Family: Salticidae
- Subfamily: Salticinae
- Genus: Marengo; Peckham & Peckham, 1892

Type species
- M. crassipes Peckham & Peckham, 1892

Species
- 6, see text

= Marengo (spider) =

Genus of spiders

Marengo is a genus of Asian jumping spiders that was first described by George and Elizabeth Peckham in 1892. The name is derived from Marengo, a village in Italy and the name of Napoleon's horse.

== Species ==
As of June 2019, the World Spider Catalog recognizes the following species, found only in Asia:

- Marengo batheryensis Sudhin, Nafin, Benjamin & Sudhikumar, 2019 – India
- Marengo crassipes Peckham & Peckham, 1892 (type) – India, Sri Lanka
- Marengo deelemanae Benjamin, 2004 – Thailand
- Marengo inornata (Simon, 1900) – Sri Lanka
- Marengo nitida Simon, 1900 – Sri Lanka
- Marengo rattotensis Benjamin, 2006 – Sri Lanka
- Marengo sachintendulkar Malamel, Prajapati, Sudhikumar & Sebastian, 2019 – India
- Marengo striatipes Simon, 1900 – Sri Lanka
- Marengo zebra Sudhin, Nafin, Benjamin & Sudhikumar, 2019 – India
