= Marengo striatipes =

Scientific classification
- Kingdom: Animalia
- Phylum: Arthropoda
- Subphylum: Chelicerata
- Class: Arachnida
- Order: Araneae
- Infraorder: Araneomorphae
- Family: Salticidae
- Genus: Marengo
- Species: M. striatipes

Binomial name
- Marengo striatipes Simon, 1900

Species of spider

Marengo striatipes, is a species of spider of the genus Marengo. It is endemic to Sri Lanka.
