= Marengo crassipes =

Scientific classification
- Kingdom: Animalia
- Phylum: Arthropoda
- Subphylum: Chelicerata
- Class: Arachnida
- Order: Araneae
- Infraorder: Araneomorphae
- Family: Salticidae
- Genus: Marengo
- Species: M. crassipes

Binomial name
- Marengo crassipes Peckham & Peckham, 1892

Species of spider

Marengo crassipes is a species of spider of the genus Marengo. It is native to India and Sri Lanka.
