= Rohan Pethiyagoda =

Sri Lankan scientist and conservationist

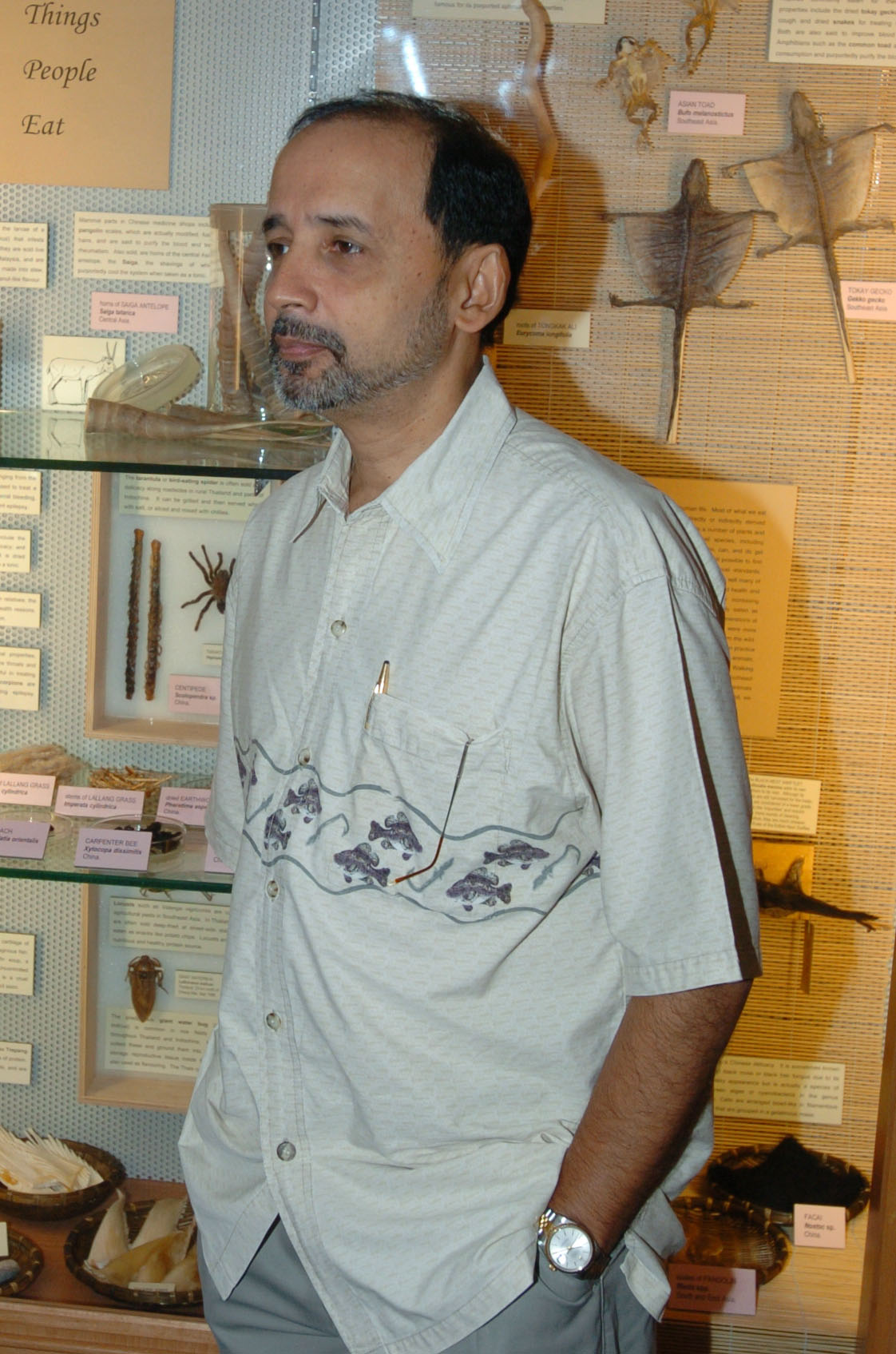
- Born: Tilak Rohan David Pethiyagoda; 19 November 1955 (age 70); Colombo, Sri Lanka
- Education: BSc, M.Phil.
- Alma mater: S. Thomas' College, Mount Lavinia, King's College, London, University of Sussex
- Occupation: Taxonomist
- Years active: 1990–present
- Employer: Australian Museum
- Notable work: Freshwater fishes of Sri Lanka (1990); Pearls, spices and green gold: an illustrated history of biodiversity exploration in Sri Lanka (2007); Horton Plains: Sri Lanka's cloud-forest national park (2012); The Ecology and Biogeography of Sri Lanka: A Context for Freshwater Fishes (2021)
- Awards: Vadamarachchi Medal, 1987, Rolex Award for Enterprise, 2000, The Linnean Medal, 2022
- Website: The Wildlife Heritage Trust of Sri Lanka

Rohan David Pethiyagoda is a Sri Lankan biodiversity scientist, amphibian and freshwater-fish taxonomist, author, conservationist and public-policy advocate.

== Early life and career ==
Born in Colombo, Sri Lanka, on 19 November 1955 Pethiyagoda had his secondary education at S. Thomas' College, Mount Lavinia. He was awarded a BSc (Eng.) Hons. in Electrical and Electronics Engineering from King's College, University of London in 1977, and a M.Phil. in Biomedical Engineering from the University of Sussex in 1980.

== Service ==
From 1981 to 1982 Pethiyagoda served as an engineer in the Division of Biomedical Engineering of the Sri Lankan Ministry of Health, and from 1982 to 1987 as director of that institution. That same year he was awarded the Vadamarachchi Medal by President J.R. Jayewardene for his services to the Sri Lanka Armed Forces during the Vadamarachchi Campaign. In 1984 he was concurrently appointed chairman of Sri Lanka's Water Resources Board. He served as Advisor on Environment and Natural resources to the Government of Sri Lanka from 2002 to 2004 and was in 2005 elected Deputy Chair of the IUCN Species Survival Commission. In 2008 Pethiyagoda was elected to the board of trustees of the International Trust for Zoological Nomenclature, having previously served a four-year term as Deputy Chair of the Assurance Group of the British American Tobacco Biodiversity Partnership. In 2009 he was appointed a research associate of the Australian Museum, Sydney, and from 2015 to 2018 he served as Chairman of the Sri Lanka Tea Board. On 22 June 2022, Pethiyagoda was appointed Senior Policy Adviser to Sajith Premadasa, MP, Leader of the Opposition of Sri Lanka.

== Naturalist life ==
He resigned from government office in 1987 to commence work on a project to explore the island's freshwater fishes, which led to his first book in 1990, Freshwater fishes of Sri Lanka, an illustrated account of the country's freshwater-fish fauna.

Pethiyagoda diverted the profits from this book to an endowment for the Wildlife Heritage Trust (WHT), a foundation he established in 1990 to further biodiversity exploration in Sri Lanka, with the business model of publishing natural history books and channelling the proceeds into further exploration and research. Between 1991 and 2012 WHT published some 40 books in both English and Sinhala, including titles such as A field guide to the birds of Sri Lanka, one of several titles translated into Sinhala and, aided by a grant from the Biodiversity Window of the World Bank / Netherlands Partnership Programme, provided free to 5,000 school libraries. This program aimed, for the first time in Sri Lanka, to put scientific local-language biodiversity texts in the hands of young people. Pethiyagoda has also been outspoken in his advocacy of policy reform in Sri Lanka, writing on subjects such as biopiracy, abortion and sexual ethics in the media, in addition to lecture-videos on diverse topics including nutrition, agricultural policy, and economic and political reform.

== Discoveries ==
Together with colleagues at WHT Pethiyagoda has been responsible for the discovery and/or description of almost 100 new species of vertebrates from Sri Lanka, including fishes, amphibians and lizards, in addition to 43 species of freshwater crabs. This work also led to the finding that some 19 species of Sri Lankan amphibians have become extinct in the past 130 years, the highest national extinction record in the world.

== Recognition ==
In 1998, concerned by the rapid loss of montane forest in Sri Lanka, Pethiyagoda began a (still ongoing) project to convert abandoned tea plantations into natural forest, for which he was honoured by the Rolex Awards for Enterprise.

In 2022, he received the Linnean Medal from the Linnean Society of London, becoming the first Sri Lankan and only the second Asian to receive this award since its inception in 1888. The following year, he became a laureate of the Asian Scientist 100 by the Asian Scientist.

In recognition of his contribution to biodiversity conservation Pethiyagoda was elected a Fellow of the National Academy of Sciences of Sri Lanka. In addition to some 60 papers in the scientific literature, he published books on the history of natural-history exploration in Sri Lanka, Sri Lankan primates, Horton Plains National Park and the biogeography of Sri Lanka. He is a research associate of the Australian Museum and serves as editor for Asian Freshwater Fishes of the journal Zootaxa.

== Legacy ==
Several new species have been named in his honour, including the fishes Dawkinsia rohani and Rasboroides rohani; the microhylid frog Uperodon rohani; the dragon lizard Calotes pethiyagodai; the jumping spider Onomastus pethiyagodai and the dragonfly Macromidia donaldi pethiyagodai. In 2020, a team of scientists led by S. D. Biju named a new genus of South and Southeast Asian tree frogs Rohanixalus in Pethiyagoda's honour.

In July 2012 Pethiyagoda and colleagues named a genus of South Asian freshwater fishes Dawkinsia in honour of the evolutionary biologist Richard Dawkins, following which Pethiyagoda told AFP that "Richard Dawkins has through his writings helped us understand that the universe is far more beautiful and awe-inspiring than any religion has imagined". Pethiyagoda also named the freshwater cyprinid genus Haludaria after the Bengali youth known only as Haludar, who illustrated the fishes depicted in Francis Hamilton's (1822) "Fishes of the Ganges", the founder work of Indian ichthyology.

== Taxa described by Pethiyagoda ==
- See Category:Taxa named by Rohan Pethiyagoda
