= Adenomera phonotriccus =

Conservation status
- Critically Endangered (IUCN 3.1)

Scientific classification
- Kingdom: Animalia
- Phylum: Chordata
- Class: Amphibia
- Order: Anura
- Family: Leptodactylidae
- Genus: Adenomera
- Species: A. phonotriccus

Binomial name
- Adenomera phonotriccus Carvalho, Giaretta, Angulo, Haddad, and Peloso, 2019

Species of frog

Adenomera phonotriccus, the tody tyrant-voiced nest-building frog, is a species of frog in the family Leptodactylidae. It is endemic to Brazil.

== Description ==
The adult male frog measures 19.8–21.6 mm in snout-vent length. The skin of the dorsum is medium brown with black flecks and spots. All four legs are red-brown in color. The iris of the eye is copper in color. The tympanum is orange in color. The belly is cream colored. Its call lasts longer than that of other Adenomera frogs: 213–433 ms.

== Etymology ==
Scientists named this frog phonotriccus for the Greek phono for "voice" or "sound" and triccus, which is a small bird.

== Habitat ==
This frog lives in primary Amazon rainforests. Scientists know it solely from the type locality near the Araguaia River. Scientists have seen it between 166 and 176 m (545 and 577 ft) above sea level.

Scientists have not seen these frogs in protected places.

== Reproduction ==
Scientists believe this frog deposits its eggs in a foam nest, where the tadpoles develop.

== Threats ==
The IUCN classifies this frog as critically endangered. It lives in a part of the Amazon that is subject to longstanding and ongoing deforestation in favor of industrial agriculture, silviculture, and livestock grazing. Hydroelectric dams may also be a danger to this frog.
