= Adenomera tapajonica =

Conservation status
- Least Concern (IUCN 3.1)

Scientific classification
- Kingdom: Animalia
- Phylum: Chordata
- Class: Amphibia
- Order: Anura
- Family: Leptodactylidae
- Genus: Adenomera
- Species: A. tapajonica

Binomial name
- Adenomera tapajonica Carvalho, Moraes, Lima, Fouquet, Peloso, Pavan, Drummond, Rodrigues, Giaretta, Gordo, Neckel-Oliveira, and Haddad, 2021

Species of frog

Adenomera tapajonica, the Tapajós terrestrial nest-building frog, is a species of frog in the family Leptodactylidae. It is endemic to Brazil.

== Habitat ==
This frog lives near the Tapajós River in non-flooding primary rainforest. Scientists have seen it between 78 and 118 m (256 and 387 ft) above sea level.

Scientists have seen these frogs in one protected place, Parque Nacional Da Amazônia. There are other protected areas adjacent to this one.

== Reproduction ==
The male frog perches on the leaf litter and calls to the female frogs. Scientists believe this frog deposits its eggs in foam nest on top of the ground, not near water.

== Threats ==
The IUCN classifies this frog as least concern of extinction. In some areas, it is subject to habitat degradation as human beings develop areas in a fish-spine pattern.

== Original description ==
- Carvalho, TR de; Moraes LJCL; Lima AP; Fouquet PA; Peloso PLV; Pavan D; Drummond L de O; Rodrigues MT; Giaretta AA; Gordo M; Neckel-Oliveira S; Haddad CFB (2021). "Systematics and historical biogeography of Neotropical foam-nesting frogs of the Adenomera heyeri clade (Leptodactylidae), with the description of six new Amazonian species". Zoological Journal of the Linnean Society (Abstract). 191 (2): 395–433. doi:10.1093/zoolinnean/zlaa051. hdl:11449/205825.
