= Adenomera aurantiaca =

Conservation status
- Least Concern (IUCN 3.1)

Scientific classification
- Kingdom: Animalia
- Phylum: Chordata
- Class: Amphibia
- Order: Anura
- Family: Leptodactylidae
- Genus: Adenomera
- Species: A. aurantiaca

Binomial name
- Adenomera aurantiaca Carvalho, Moraes, Lima, Fouquet, Peloso, Pavan, Drummond, Rodrigues, Giaretta, Gordo, Neckel-Oliveira, and Haddad, 2021

Species of frog

Adenomera aurantiaca, the orange-legged terrestrial nest-building frog, is a species of frog in the family Leptodactylidae. It is endemic to Brazil.

== Habitat ==
This frog lives in lowland rainforests that do not flood. Scientists have seen it between 78 and 102 m (256 and 335 ft) above sea level.

Scientists have seen these frogs in one protected place, Floresta Nacional de Itaituba II, along the Rio Jamanxim.

== Threats ==
The IUCN classifies this species as least concern of dying out. However, some of the frogs live near the expanding town of Trairão, and small-scale agriculture has had a significant impact.

== Original descriptin ==
- Carvalho, TR de; Moraes LJCL; Lima AP; Fouquet PA; Peloso PLV; Pavan D; Drummond L de O; Rodrigues MT; Giaretta AA; Gordo M; Neckel-Oliveira S; Haddad CFB (2021). "Systematics and historical biogeography of Neotropical foam-nesting frogs of the Adenomera heyeri clade (Leptodactylidae), with the description of six new Amazonian species". Zoological Journal of the Linnean Society (Abstract). 191 (2): 395–433. doi:10.1093/zoolinnean/zlaa051. hdl:11449/205825.
