= Adenomera kweti =

Conservation status
- Endangered (IUCN 3.1)

Scientific classification
- Kingdom: Animalia
- Phylum: Chordata
- Class: Amphibia
- Order: Anura
- Family: Leptodactylidae
- Genus: Adenomera
- Species: A. kweti

Binomial name
- Adenomera kweti Carvalho, Cassini, Taucce, and Haddad, 2019

Species of frog

Adenomera kweti, or Kwet's nest-building frog, is a frog in the family Leptodactylidae. It is endemic to Brazil.

== Habitat ==
This frog is an obligate forest dweller, specifically Atlantic rainforests. It has been found on the dead leaves on the ground. Scientists have seen it between 0 and 1,070 m (0 and 3,510 ft) above sea level.

Scientists have reported these frogs in protected places, for example Parque Estadual da Serra do Tabuleiro, which the IUCN says provides good protection, and in Parque Natural Municipal do Maciço da Costeira.

== Reproduction ==
The male frog sits under dead vegetation consisting largely of rotting bamboo leaves and calls to the female frogs. Scientists believe this frog deposits its eggs in foam nests, where the tadpoles develop.

== Threats ==
The IUCN classifies this frog as endangered. Human beings convert forests for urbanization, agriculture, silviculture, small-scale livestock cultivation, and sandstone mining.
