= Adenomera varcena =

Scientific classification
- Kingdom: Animalia
- Phylum: Chordata
- Class: Amphibia
- Order: Anura
- Family: Leptodactylidae
- Genus: Adenomera
- Species: A. varcena

Binomial name
- Adenomera varcena Borburema, Moraes, Santos, Ron, Haddad, Giaretta, Carvalho, 2026

Species of frog

Adenomera varcena is a species of frog in the family Leptodactylidae. It occurs in the upper Amazon basin of Ecuador, Peru, and Brazil. It inhabits the várzea forests.
