= Adenomera cotuba =

Conservation status
- Near Threatened (IUCN 3.1)

Scientific classification
- Kingdom: Animalia
- Phylum: Chordata
- Class: Amphibia
- Order: Anura
- Family: Leptodactylidae
- Genus: Adenomera
- Species: A. cotuba

Binomial name
- Adenomera cotuba Carvalho and Giaretta, 2013

Species of frog

Adenomera cotuba, the Teresina de Goiás tropical bullfrog, is a species of frog in the family Leptodactylidae. It is endemic to Brazil.

== Habitat ==
This frog is found in Cerrado biomes and in rocky areas with limestone, such as savannas and dry forests. Scientists have seen it between 275 and 840 m (902 and 2,756 ft) above sea level.

Scientists have reported these frogs in protected places, including Área de Preservação Ambiental Pouso Alto and Parque Nacional da Chapada dos Veadeiros.

== Reproduction ==
Scientists believe this frog puts its eggs in nests made out of bubbles. Scientists think the tadpoles grow in the nest.

== Threats ==
The IUCN classifies this frog as near threatened. It is endemic to a large deforestation arc that is subject to ongoing land conversion. The frog lives in savanna grassland and dry forests, which people convert to intensive agriculture. Hydroelectric projects may also be a danger to this frog.

== Original description ==
- De Carvalho TR; Giaretta AA (2013). "Bioacoustics reveals two new synoptic species of Adenomera Steindachner (Anura: Leptodactylidae: Leptodactylinae) in the Cerrado of central Brazil". Zootaxa. 3731: 533–551.
