= Adenomera amicorum =

Conservation status
- Least Concern (IUCN 3.1)

Scientific classification
- Kingdom: Animalia
- Phylum: Chordata
- Class: Amphibia
- Order: Anura
- Family: Leptodactylidae
- Genus: Adenomera
- Species: A. amicorum

Binomial name
- Adenomera amicorum Carvalho, Moraes, Lima, Fouquet, Peloso, Pavan, Drummond, Rodrigues, Giaretta, Gordo, Neckel-Oliveira, and Haddad, 2021

Species of frog

Adenomera amicorum, the Santarém terrestrial nest-building frog, is a species of frog in the family Leptodactylidae. It is endemic to Brazil.

== Habitat ==
This frog lives in lowland rainforests. Scientists have observed it between 104 and 155 m (341 and 509 ft) above sea level. It is found on the leaf litter.

Scientists have reported these frogs in a protected place, Floresta Nacional do Tapajós.

== Threats ==
The IUCN classifies this species as least concern of extinction. However, the subpopulations near urban areas that are expanding may be in some danger. People also build small farms near the towns.

== Original description ==
- Carvalho, TR de; Moraes LJCL; Lima AP; Fouquet PA; Peloso PLV; Pavan D; Drummond L de O; Rodrigues MT; Giaretta AA; Gordo M; Neckel-Oliveira S; Haddad CFB (2021). "Systematics and historical biogeography of Neotropical foam-nesting frogs of the Adenomera heyeri clade (Leptodactylidae), with the description of six new Amazonian species". Zoological Journal of the Linnean Society (Abstract). 191 (2): 395–433. doi:10.1093/zoolinnean/zlaa051. hdl:11449/205825.
