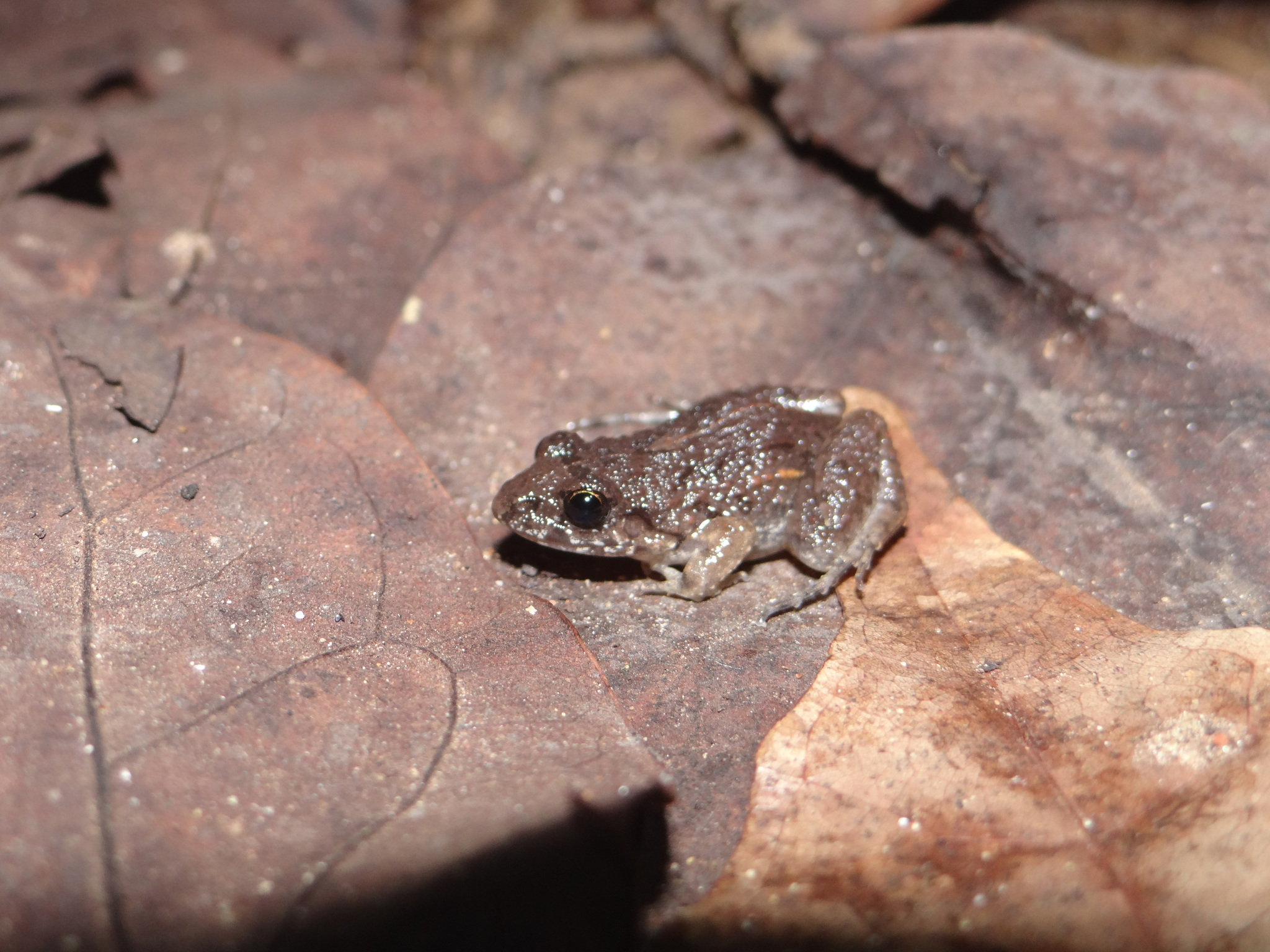

Conservation status
- Least Concern (IUCN 3.1)

Scientific classification
- Kingdom: Animalia
- Phylum: Chordata
- Class: Amphibia
- Order: Anura
- Family: Leptodactylidae
- Genus: Adenomera
- Species: A. chicomendesi

Binomial name
- Adenomera chicomendesi Carvalho, Angulo, Kokubum, Barrera, Souza, Haddad, and Giaretta, 2019

= Adenomera chicomendesi =

Species of frog

Adenomera chicomendesi, the Rio Branco tropical bullfrog or Chico Mendes' terrestrial nest-building frog, is a species of frog in the family Leptodactylidae. It is endemic to Brazil, Bolivia, and Peru.

== Habitat ==
This frog is found in Amazon biomes. It has been seen in primary and secondary lowland forest. It has also been found in small forest fragments in urban areas. Scientists have seen it between 167 and 242 m (548 and 794 ft) above sea level.

Scientists have seen these frogs in protected areas, three of which are Tambopata National Reserve, Amboró National Park, and Parque Zoobotânico from Universidade Federal do Acre.

== Reproduction ==
The male frog hides or perches on the leaf litter and calls to the female frogs. Scientists believe this frog deposits its eggs underground, where the larvae develop.

== Threats ==
The IUCN classifies this frog as least concern of extinction. In some parts of its range, illegal mining and logging may pose some threat.

== Original description ==
- de Carvalho TR; A Angulo; MNC Kokubum; DA Barrera; MB de Souza; CFB Haddad; AA Giaretta (2019). "A new cryptic species of the Adenomera andreae clade from southwestern Amazonia (Anura, Leptodactylidae)". Herpetologica (Abstract). 75: 233–246. doi:10.1655/D-18-00049. hdl:11449/196192.
