= Adenomera gridipappi =

Conservation status
- Data Deficient (IUCN 3.1)

Scientific classification
- Kingdom: Animalia
- Phylum: Chordata
- Class: Amphibia
- Order: Anura
- Family: Leptodactylidae
- Genus: Adenomera
- Species: A. gridipappi

Binomial name
- Adenomera gridipappi Carvalho, Moraes, Lima, Fouquet, Peloso, Pavan, Drummond, Rodrigues, Giaretta, Gordo, Neckel-Oliveira, and Haddad, 2021

Species of frog

Adenomera gridipappi, or Gridi-Papp's terrestrial nest-building frog, is a frog. It is endemic to Brazil.

== Habitat ==
This frog lives in lowland rainforests that do not flood. Scientists have seen it 121 m (397 ft) above sea level.

Scientists know these frogs solely from the type locality, which is not near any protected places.

== Threats ==
The IUCN classifies this species as data deficient. Limited suitable forest habitat remains, and it is surrounded by farmland.

== Original description ==
- Carvalho, TR de; Moraes LJCL; Lima AP; Fouquet PA; Peloso PLV; Pavan D; Drummond L de O; Rodrigues MT; Giaretta AA; Gordo M; Neckel-Oliveira S; Haddad CFB (2021). "Systematics and historical biogeography of Neotropical foam-nesting frogs of the Adenomera heyeri clade (Leptodactylidae), with the description of six new Amazonian species". Zoological Journal of the Linnean Society (Abstract). 191 (2): 395–433. doi:10.1093/zoolinnean/zlaa051. hdl:11449/205825.
