= Adenomera inopinata =

Conservation status
- Data Deficient (IUCN 3.1)

Scientific classification
- Kingdom: Animalia
- Phylum: Chordata
- Class: Amphibia
- Order: Anura
- Family: Leptodactylidae
- Genus: Adenomera
- Species: A. inopinata

Binomial name
- Adenomera inopinata Carvalho, Moraes, Lima, Fouquet, Peloso, Pavan, Drummond, Rodrigues, Giaretta, Gordo, Neckel-Oliveira, and Haddad, 2021

Species of frog

Adenomera inopinata, the unforeseen terrestrial nest-building frog, is a species of frog in the family Leptodactylidae. It is endemic to Brazil.

== Habitat ==
This frog lives in lowland rainforests, where it is found on the leaf litter. Scientists have seen it 143 m (469 ft) above sea level.

Scientists have not seen these frogs in any protected places, but Parque Nacional Da Amazônia is about 40 kilometers from where they did see it, along the same revier. Scientists think the frogs may live there.

== Threats ==
The IUCN classifies this species as data deficient. Although the type locality is within Floresta Nacional De Itaituba I, the area nearby is subject to considerable habitat loss as humans expand towns, farms, and livestock grazing areas in a fish-spine pattern along the river.

== Original description ==
- Carvalho, TR de; Moraes LJCL; Lima AP; Fouquet PA; Peloso PLV; Pavan D; Drummond L de O; Rodrigues MT; Giaretta AA; Gordo M; Neckel-Oliveira S; Haddad CFB (2021). "Systematics and historical biogeography of Neotropical foam-nesting frogs of the Adenomera heyeri clade (Leptodactylidae), with the description of six new Amazonian species". Zoological Journal of the Linnean Society (Abstract). 191 (2): 395–433. doi:10.1093/zoolinnean/zlaa051. hdl:11449/205825.
