= Adenomera kayapo =

Conservation status
- Least Concern (IUCN 3.1)

Scientific classification
- Kingdom: Animalia
- Phylum: Chordata
- Class: Amphibia
- Order: Anura
- Family: Leptodactylidae
- Genus: Adenomera
- Species: A. kayapo

Binomial name
- Adenomera kayapo Carvalho, Moraes, Lima, Fouquet, Peloso, Pavan, Drummond, Rodrigues, Giaretta, Gordo, Neckel-Oliveira, and Haddad, 2021

Species of frog

Adenomera kayapo, the Kayapó terrestrial nest-building frog, is a species of frog in the family Leptodactylidae. It is endemic to Brazil.

== Habitat ==
This frog lives in lowland, non-flooding rainforests. Scientists have seen it between 121 and 701 m (397 and 2,300 ft)above sea level.

Scientists have seen these frogs in a protected place, Floresta Nacional de Carajás. They may also have seen it in Parque Nacional Dos Campos Ferruginosos.

== Threats ==
The IUCN classifies this frog as least concern of extinction. However, much of its range lies within a major Amazon deforestation arc, where forest is permanently converted to subsistence agriculture, large-scale monoculture, and livestock grazing. Copper, gold, and manganese mining can also affect the frog.

== Original description ==
- Carvalho, TR de; Moraes LJCL; Lima AP; Fouquet PA; Peloso PLV; Pavan D; Drummond L de O; Rodrigues MT; Giaretta AA; Gordo M; Neckel-Oliveira S; Haddad CFB (2021). "Systematics and historical biogeography of Neotropical foam-nesting frogs of the Adenomera heyeri clade (Leptodactylidae), with the description of six new Amazonian species". Zoological Journal of the Linnean Society (Abstract). 191 (2): 395–433. doi:10.1093/zoolinnean/zlaa051. hdl:11449/205825.
