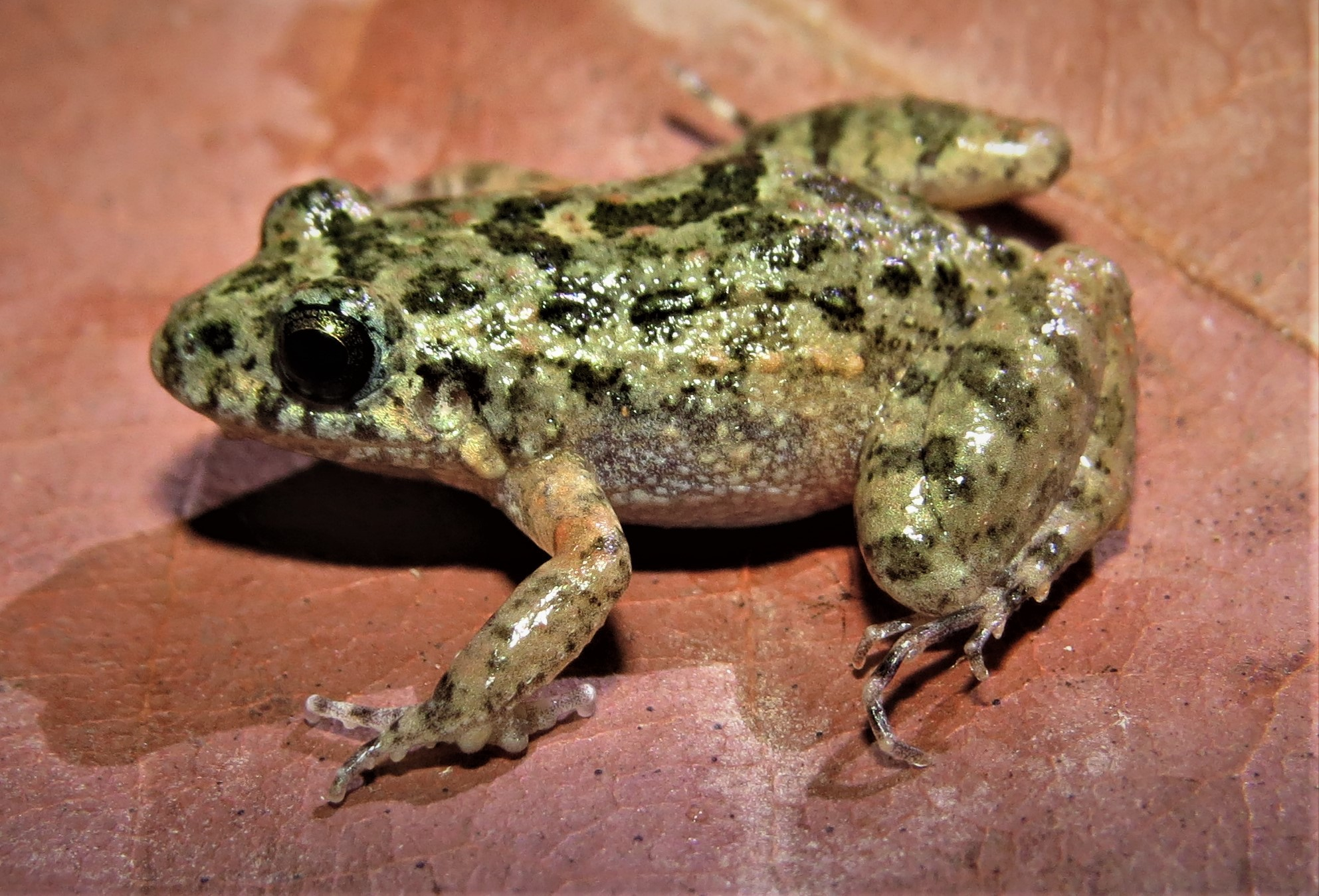

Conservation status
- Least Concern (IUCN 3.1)

Scientific classification
- Kingdom: Animalia
- Phylum: Chordata
- Class: Amphibia
- Order: Anura
- Family: Leptodactylidae
- Genus: Adenomera
- Species: A. juikitam

Binomial name
- Adenomera juikitam Carvalho and Giaretta, 2013

= Adenomera juikitam =

Species of frog

Adenomera juikitam, the Goiás tropical bullfrog, is a species of frog in the family Leptodactylidae. It is endemic to Brazil.

== Habitat ==
This frog is known from Cerrado, Caatinga, and other biomes. It lives in areas with rocky limestone or sandy soil. This frog lives where there is at least some shade.

Scientists know these frogs exclusively from protected places: Área de Preservação Ambiental Pouso Alto and Parque Nacional da Chapada dos Veadeiros.

== Reproduction ==
Scientists think this frog reproduces on land and the tadpoles do not eat.

== Threats ==
The IUCN classifies this species as least concern of extinction with no specific threats.

== Original paper ==
- De Carvalho TR; Giaretta AA (2013). "Bioacoustics reveals two new synoptic species of Adenomera Steindachner (Anura: Leptodactylidae: Leptodactylinae) in the Cerrado of central Brazil". Zootaxa. 3731: 533–551.
