= Leptodactylus rugosus =

Conservation status
- Least Concern (IUCN 3.1)

Scientific classification
- Kingdom: Animalia
- Phylum: Chordata
- Class: Amphibia
- Order: Anura
- Family: Leptodactylidae
- Genus: Leptodactylus
- Species: L. rugosus

Binomial name
- Leptodactylus rugosus Noble, 1923

Synonyms
- Leptodactylus rugosus Boulenger, 1918; Leptodactylus (Pachypus) rugosus Vellard, 1947

Species of frog

Leptodactylus rugosus is a species of frog in the family Leptodactylidae. It is also known as the Guyana white-lipped frog and the rugose thin-toed frog.

== Habitat ==
It is found in Guyana, Venezuela, and possibly Brazil. Its natural habitats are subtropical or tropical moist lowland forests, subtropical or tropical moist montane forests, rivers, intermittent rivers, and rocky areas. Scientists observed the frog between 230 and 2100 meters above sea level.

Scientists have reported the frog in some protected parks, such as Kaieteur National Park and Parque Nacional Canaima.

== Reproduction ==
The frog makes a foam nest in shallow water for its eggs. Scientists have seen the tadpoles swimming or moving on wet rocks. The tadpoles are brown in color with cream-white spots on their throats.

== Threats ==
Scientists from the IUCN and the Venezuela Red List classify this frog as least concern of extinction. In some parts of their range, these frogs may face some danger from mining.
