= Adenomera guarani =

Guaraní leaf-litter frog

Scientific classification
- Kingdom: Animalia
- Phylum: Chordata
- Class: Amphibia
- Order: Anura
- Family: Leptodactylidae
- Genus: Adenomera
- Species: A. guarani

Binomial name
- Adenomera guarani Zaracho, Lavilla, Carvalho, Motte & Basso, 2023

Species of frog

Adenomera guarani, the Guaraní leaf-litter frog, is a species of frog native to Paraguay, Argentina, and Brazil. The frog is named for the Guaraní people which live in the same region as A. guarani.

== Description ==
Adenomera guarani exhibits between 6% and 8% genetic divergence from other species in Adenomera. Males have a snout-vent length of 23.1 mm, while those of females measure about 22.9 mm. Males and females have similar foot lengths, measuring around 11.5 mm. Heads are wider than their length, with males possessing a head width of 8.3 mm and a head length of 7.7 mm; in contrast, females have a head width of 8.1 mm and a head length of 7.5 mm.

Advertisement calls of A. guarani have a repetition rate of 73-147 per minute, which is fewer than some other Adenomera species, such as Adenomera diptyx.
