= Adenomera nana =

Conservation status
- Least Concern (IUCN 3.1)

Scientific classification
- Kingdom: Animalia
- Phylum: Chordata
- Class: Amphibia
- Order: Anura
- Family: Leptodactylidae
- Genus: Adenomera
- Species: A. nana

Binomial name
- Adenomera nana (Müller, 1922)

Synonyms
- Leptodactylus nanus Müller, 1922; Leptodactylus (Parvulus) nanus Müller, 1922

Species of frog

Adenomera nana, the Santa Catarina tropical bullfrog, is a species of frog in the family Leptodactylidae. It is endemic to Brazil.

== Habitat ==
This frog is found in Atlantic forest biomes and in urbanized areas and gardens. Scientists have observed it between 0 and 950 m (0 and 3,117 ft) meters above sea level. It has been found in protected parks.

== Reproduction ==
This species reproduces through direct development. The female frog depistes her eggs in an underground foam nest. The young hatch out of their eggs as small froglets.

== Threats ==
The IUCN classifies this frog as least concern of extinction.

== Formal description ==
- Kwet, A. (2007). "Bioacoustic variation in the genus Adenomera in southern Brazil, with revalidation of Leptodactylus nanusMüller, 1922 (Anura, Leptodactylidae). Zoosystematics and Evolution". Reihe (Abstract). 83: 56–68. doi:10.1002/mmnz.200600027.
