= Adenomera glauciae =

Conservation status
- Least Concern (IUCN 3.1)

Scientific classification
- Kingdom: Animalia
- Phylum: Chordata
- Class: Amphibia
- Order: Anura
- Family: Leptodactylidae
- Genus: Adenomera
- Species: A. glauciae

Binomial name
- Adenomera glauciae Carvalho, Simões, Gagliardi-Urrutia, Rojas-Runjaic, Haddad, and Castroviejo-Fisher, 2020

Species of frog

Adenomera glauciae, or Glaucia's terrestrial nest-building frog, is a species of frog in the family Leptodactylidae. It is endemic to Brazil and suspected in Colombia.

== Habitat ==
This frog lives in Amazon forests, where it has been observed on the leaf litter. Scientists have seen it between 87 and 105 m (285 and 344 ft) above sea level. It was first reported from the Japurá River basin.

Scientists have reported these frogs in one protected place, Estação Ecológica Juami-Japurá.

== Threats ==
The IUCN classifies this frog as least concern of extinction and lists no specific threats.
