= Adenomera albarena =

Scientific classification
- Kingdom: Animalia
- Phylum: Chordata
- Class: Amphibia
- Order: Anura
- Family: Leptodactylidae
- Genus: Adenomera
- Species: A. albarena

Binomial name
- Adenomera albarena Martins, Mônico, Mendonça, Dantas, Souza, Hanken, Lima, and Ferrão, 2024

Species of frog

Adenomera albarena, the white-sand terrestrial nest-building frog, is a species of frog in the family Leptodactylidae. It is endemic to Brazil and suspected in Colombia.

== Description ==
The adult male frog measures 21.2–23.0 mm in snout-vent length and the adult female frog 22.1–24.3 mm. The adult male frog has dark melanophoress on his throat. Each frog has mauve coloration on the throat and the undersides of the legs. Each frog has a dark stripe under each front leg. The frog's snout has brown and pale gray color with some sky blue near the lips. The tympanum is dark in color at the edge and buff in the middle. The skin of the dorsum is brown. There are white tubercules on the back nearer to the rear end. There is an orange stripe on part of the backbone.

== Etymology ==
Scientists named this frog albarena for two Latin words: alba for "white" and arena for "sand."

== Habitat ==
This frog only lives in places with white sand. Scientists found it near the West Negro River and Solimões River. Scientists have seen these frogs in a single protected place, Rio Negro Sustainable Development Reserve.

== Reproduction ==
The male frog sits on the ground or in the dead leaves on the ground and calls to the female frogs. Male frogs and juveniles are easy to find, but adult female frogs are difficult to find. The male frog digs a hole in the ground and the female frog makes a foam nest in the hole. The male frog sometimes digs the hole under the leaf litter or near palm tree roots or fern roots.

== Threats ==
The frog only lives in one kind of habitat, which means that habitat alteration could affect it profoundly. It is subject to deforestation, mining, and livestock grazing.
