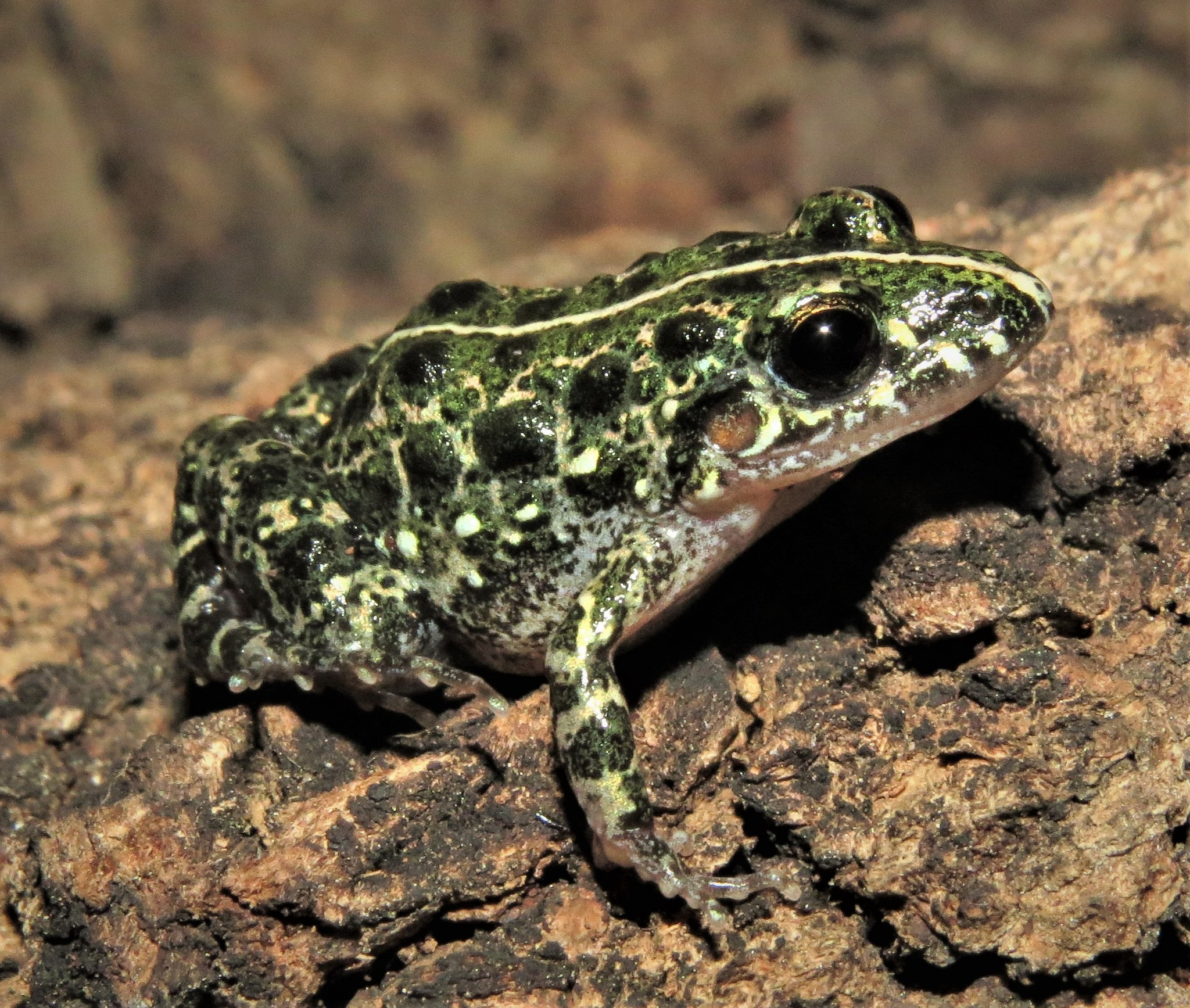

Conservation status
- Least Concern (IUCN 3.1)

Scientific classification
- Kingdom: Animalia
- Phylum: Chordata
- Class: Amphibia
- Order: Anura
- Family: Leptodactylidae
- Genus: Adenomera
- Species: A. saci

Binomial name
- Adenomera saci Carvalho and Giaretta, 2013

= Adenomera saci =

Species of frog

Adenomera saci is a species of frog in the family Leptodactylidae. It is endemic to central-western and northern Brazil. Prior to its description by Carvalho and Giaretta in 2013, it was confused with Adenomera martinezi. The specific name saci is Portuguese word for a kind of whistling imp in Brazilian (Tupi) folklore, in allusion to the whistling call of this frog.

== Description ==
Adult males measure 20–23 mm (0.8–0.9 in) and adult females, based on just one specimen, 24 mm (0.9 in) in snout–vent length. The snout is pointed in dorsal view and acuminate in lateral view; in males, the snout tip has a weakly to well-developed fleshy ridge. The tympanum and supratympanic fold are present. The finger tips are rounded but not expanded, without webbing or fringing. The toe tips are unexpanded and unflattened; no webbing is present. Dorsal coloration consists of 4–6 symmetrically arranged rows of longitudinal dark-colored spots on dark gray to very dark brown background. Cream-colored vertebral stripe is present. The throat and belly are cream colored, sometimes finely covered with white spots. Males have an internal, subgular vocal sac.

The male advertisement call is a long (72–241 ms) whistle. This call is different from that of the morphologically very similar Adenomera martinezi even to the human ear.

The tadpoles are dorsoventrally compressed. Gosner stage 37 tadpole measures 35 mm (1.4 in) in total length; the body measures 10 mm (0.4 in).

== Habitat and conservation ==
Adenomera saci occurs in montane rock fields with sandy/muddy soil at elevations above 1,000 m (3,300 ft), and in lowland grassy fields with sandy/muddy soil, almost always associated with palm grove marshes (veredas), at about 350 m (1,150 ft) above sea level. Males call within underground chambers or from exposed calling sites, typically among grassy tufts. This species is mainly active during the night, but in rainy days, males can also be heard during the day.

Scientists have reported these frogs in protected places: Área de Presenvação Ambiental das Nascentes do Rio Vermelho, Área de Presenvação Ambiental do Planalto Central, Área de Presenvação Ambiental Ilha do Bananal/Cantão, Área de Presenvação Ambiental Jalapão, Área de Presenvação Ambiental Pouso Alto, Área de Presenvação Ambiental Serra do Lajeado, Estação Ecológica Serra Geral do Tocantins, Parque Estadual do Araguaia, Parque Estadual do Jalapão, Parque Nacional da Chapada dos Veadeiros, and Parque Nacional do Araguaia.

The International Union for Conservation of Nature (IUCN) assessed A. saci as a separate species in 2021. However, Carvalho and Giaretta (2013) suggest that the current conservation status of Adenomera martinezi, "least concern", should apply to Adenomera saci. In contrast, after its redelimitation, they suggest that A. martinezi would qualify as "near threatened".
