= Adenomera coca =

Conservation status
- Least Concern (IUCN 3.1)

Scientific classification
- Kingdom: Animalia
- Phylum: Chordata
- Class: Amphibia
- Order: Anura
- Family: Leptodactylidae
- Genus: Adenomera
- Species: A. coca

Binomial name
- Adenomera coca (Angulo and Reichle, 2008)

Synonyms
- Leptodactylus coca Angulo and Reichle, 2008

Species of frog

Adenomera coca is a frog. It lives in Bolivia.

== Habitat ==
This frog lives in open areas and near vegetation in rainforests. Scientists have seen this frog between 500 and 800 m (1,600 and 2,600 ft) meters above sea level.

Scientists have seen these frogs in a protected place, Parque Nacional Carrasco.

== Reproduction ==
The male frog calls to female frogs after heavy rain. This frog deposits its eggs underground in foam nests.

== Threats ==
The IUCN classifies this species as least concern of extinction. In some places, the pesticides used on coca may hurt this frog.

== Original description ==
- Angulo A; Reichle S (2008). "Acoustic signals, species diagnosis, and species concepts: the case of a new cryptic species of Leptodactylus (Amphibia, Anura, Leptodactylidae) from the Chapare region, Bolivia". Zool J Linn Soc (Abstract). 152 (1): 59–77. doi:10.1111/j.1096-3642.2007.00338.x.
