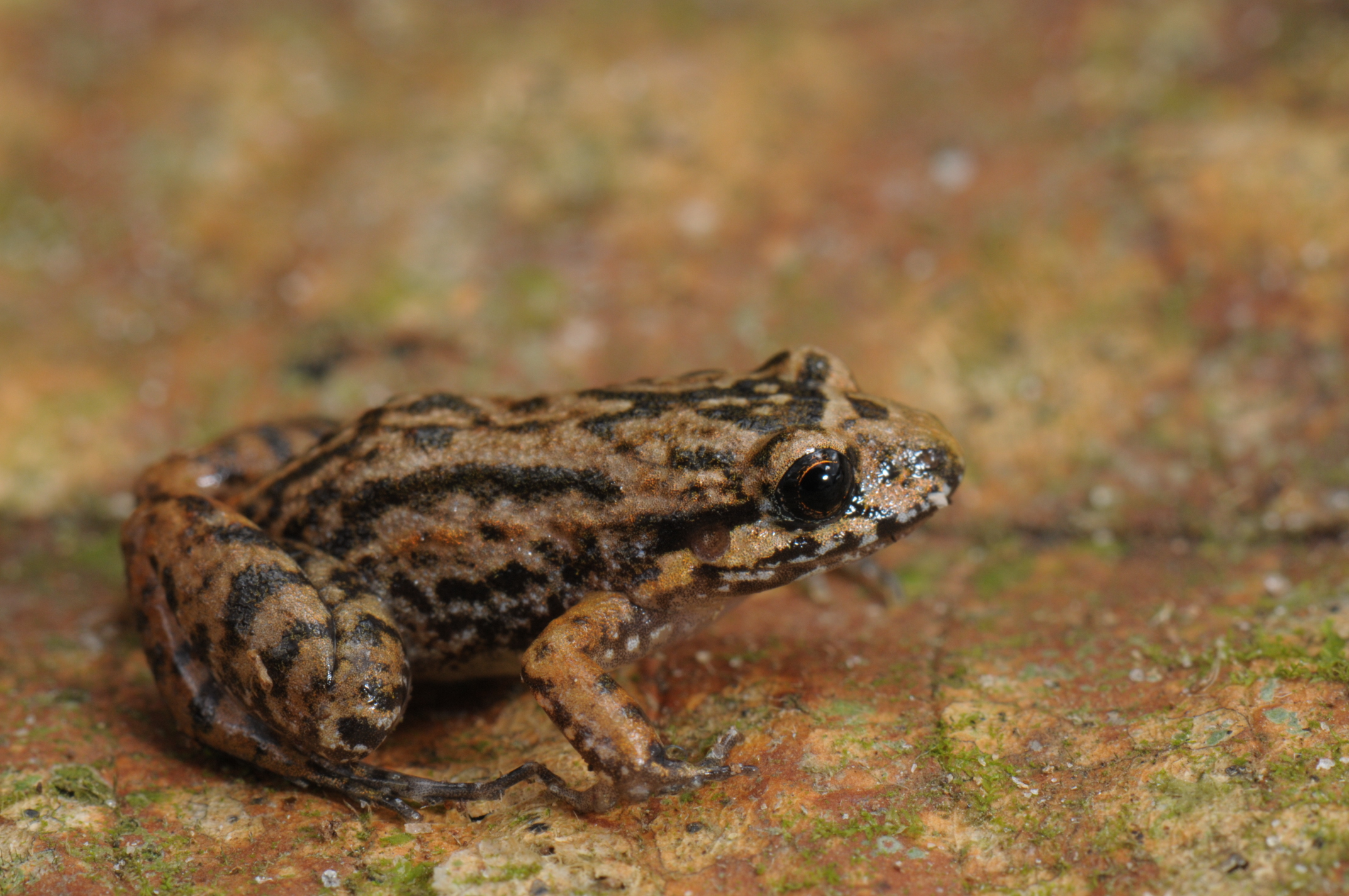

Conservation status
- Least Concern (IUCN 3.1)

Scientific classification
- Kingdom: Animalia
- Phylum: Chordata
- Class: Amphibia
- Order: Anura
- Family: Leptodactylidae
- Genus: Adenomera
- Species: A. thomei

Binomial name
- Adenomera thomei (Almeida and Angulo, 2006)

Synonyms
- Leptodactylus thomei Almeida and Angulo, 2006

= Adenomera thomei =

Species of frog

Adenomera thomei is a species of frog in the family Leptodactylidae. It is endemic to Brazil.

== Habitat ==
This frog lives in Atlantic forest biomes. People also see them in forest fragments and in disturbed areas, such as next to cacao plantations. They tend to be found on sandy ground and on the leaf litter between 0 and 100 m (0 and 328 ft) meters above sea level.

Scientists have seen these frogs in protected places, for example APA Lagoa Encantada and Refúgio de Vida Silvestre Municipal das Serras de Marica.

== Reproduction ==
The male frog perches on the leaf litter and calls to the female frogs. This frog deposits eggs in a foam nest on very wet ground or in pools of stagnant water.

== Threats ==
The IUCN classifies this species as least concern.
