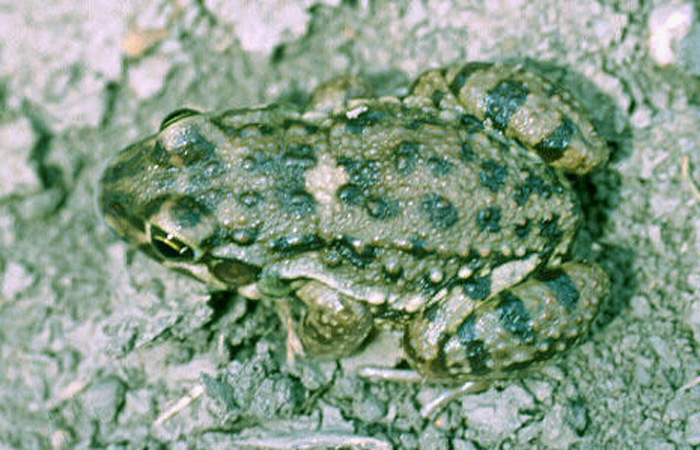

Conservation status
- Least Concern (IUCN 3.1)

Scientific classification
- Kingdom: Animalia
- Phylum: Chordata
- Class: Amphibia
- Order: Anura
- Family: Leptodactylidae
- Genus: Leptodactylus
- Species: L. bufonius

Binomial name
- Leptodactylus bufonius Boulenger, 1894

= Leptodactylus bufonius =

Species of frog

Leptodactylus bufonius, known commonly as the Oven frog, is a species of amphibian in the family Leptodactylidae. It is found in Argentina, Bolivia, Brazil, and Paraguay.

== Taxonomy ==
The species was first described by George Albert Boulenger in an 1894 publication. He did not designate a holotype for the new species, instead having four syntypes. In 1931, Hampton Wildman Parker examined the syntypes, and placed the smallest two of them into Leptodactylus diptyx. Ronald Heyer would go on to designate one of the remaining two specimens as the lectotype in 1978, basing the selection on it being the closest match to Boulenger's original description. Boulenger did not comment on his choice of bufonius as the specific name of the species, but later authors have connected it to the Latin word for toad, bufo, and the presence of small bumps on the frog's back.

== Habitat ==
These generalist frogs live in many kinds of habitats. In Brazil, it has been reported in Amazonia, Pantanal, and Cerrado biomes. It has been observed as high as 800 meters above sea level. This frog has shown tolerance to anthropogenic disturbance.

The frog has been reported in many protected areas: Mburucuyá, Río Pilcomayo, Defensores del Chaco, and Copo national parks and Salinas Grandes, Chancani, and Loro Hablador provincial parks.

== Reproduction ==
The male frogs dig burrows near ponds for the eggs.

== Threats ==
The IUCN classifies this frog as least concern of extinction. In some parts of their range, frogs might face some danger from habitat loss in favor of agriculture and toxicity from agrochemicals.
