= Adenomera engelsi =

Conservation status
- Least Concern (IUCN 3.1)

Scientific classification
- Kingdom: Animalia
- Phylum: Chordata
- Class: Amphibia
- Order: Anura
- Family: Leptodactylidae
- Genus: Adenomera
- Species: A. engelsi

Binomial name
- Adenomera engelsi Kwet, Steiner, and Zillikens, 2009

Synonyms
- Leptodactylus engelsi (Kwet, Steiner & Zillikens, 2009)

Species of frog

Adenomera engelsi, the Ilha de Santa Catarina tropical bullfrog, is a species of frog in the family Leptodactylidae. It is endemic to Brazil.

== Habitat ==
This frog lives in Atlantic forests biomes. It has been observed on leaf litter in primary and secondary forest. It has shown some tolerance to habitat disturbance. Scientists have seen it between 0 and 900 m (0 and 2,953 ft) above sea level.

Scientists have reported these frogs in protected places: Parque Estadual Serra do Tabuleiro, Monumento Natural Municipal da Lagoa do Peri, and Parque Municipal do Maciço da Costeira.

== Reproduction ==
This frog deposits its eggs in foam nests on the ground far from water. Scientists believe this frog breeds through direct development.

== Threats ==
The IUCN classifies this frog as least concern of extinction. In some parts of its range, it is in some danger from habitat loss associated with agriculture and urbanization, but large swaths of forest remain, and the species is successful in forest fragments.
