= Adenomera guarayo =

Scientific classification
- Kingdom: Animalia
- Phylum: Chordata
- Class: Amphibia
- Order: Anura
- Family: Leptodactylidae
- Genus: Adenomera
- Species: A. guarayo

Binomial name
- Adenomera guarayo Carvalho, Angulo, Barrera, Aguilar-Puntriano, and Haddad, 2020

Species of frog

Adenomera guarayo, the Guarayo nest-building terrestrial frog, is a frog. It lives in Bolivia and Peru.

== Habitat ==
This frog lives in lowland forests in Peru and Bolivia. The type locality is on the Laguna Chica Trail in Peru's Tambopata National Reserve.

== Original publication ==
- de Carvalho TR; A Angulo; DA Barrera; C Aguilar-Puntriano; CFB Haddad (2020). "Hiding in plain sight: a fourth new cryptic species of the Adenomera andreae Clade (Anura: Leptodactylidae) from southwestern Amazonia". Herpetologica (Abstract). 76: 304–314. doi:10.1655/Herpetologica-D-19-00068.1. hdl:11449/206603.
