= Adenomera simonstuarti =

Conservation status
- Least Concern (IUCN 3.1)

Scientific classification
- Kingdom: Animalia
- Phylum: Chordata
- Class: Amphibia
- Order: Anura
- Family: Leptodactylidae
- Genus: Adenomera
- Species: A. simonstuarti

Binomial name
- Adenomera simonstuarti (Angulo and Icochea, 2010)

Synonyms
- Leptodactylus simonstuarti Angulo and Icochea, 2010

Species of frog

Adenomera simonstuarti is a frog. It is endemic to Peru and Brazil and suspected in Ecuador, Bolivia, Colombia, and Venezuela.

== Description ==
The adult male frog measures 26.2 mm in snout-vent length and the adult female frog 25.2 mm. The skin of the dorsum is gray-brown in color with darker marks from the middle of the back to the groin. There is a tan-orange line from each eye to near the end. There is a dark stripe on each side of the body with a light stripe next to it. There are two dark bars under each eye. There are white spots on both lips. The upper skin of the front feet are the heels is orange-red in color. The belly is gray-white in color.

== Habitat ==
This terrestrial frog has been seen on the leaf litter in Amazon primary and secondary forest. This frog has shown some tolerance to habitat disturbance. It has been found on cacao farms and areas subjected to selective logging. Scientists have seen this frog between 280 and 700 m (920 and 2,300 ft) meters above sea level.

Scientists have seen these frogs in a protected places.

== Threats ==
The IUCN classifies this species as least concern of extinction. In some parts of its range, it suffers habitat loss associated with agriculture, livestock cultivation, logging, and oil and gas drilling.

== Original description ==
- Angulo, A; Ichochea, J (2010). "Cryptic species complexes, widespread species and conservation: lessons from Amazonian frogs of the Leptodactylus marmoratus group (Anura: Leptodactylidae)". Systematics and Biodiversity (Abstract and acknowledgements). 8: 357–370. doi:10.1080/14772000.2010.507264.
