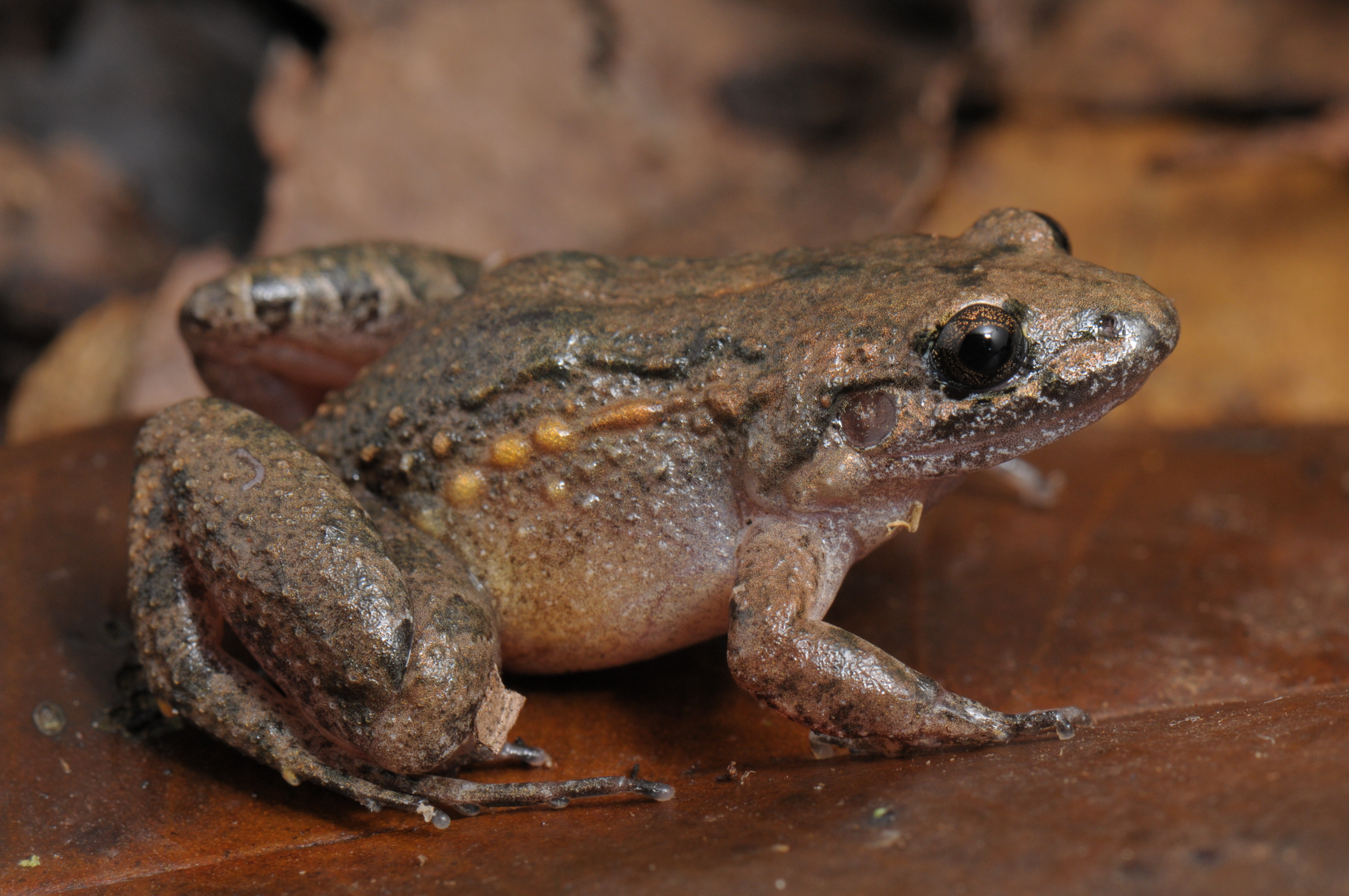
- Adenomera marmorata

Scientific classification
- Kingdom: Animalia
- Phylum: Chordata
- Class: Amphibia
- Order: Anura
- Family: Leptodactylidae
- Subfamily: Leptodactylinae
- Genus: Adenomera; Steindachner, 1867

Type species
- Adenomera marmorata Steindachner, 1867

Diversity
- over 25 species, see text

= Adenomera =

Genus of amphibians

Adenomera is a genus of leptodactylid frogs, sometimes known as tropical bullfrogs, found in South America east of the Andes. The genus was until recently considered a synonym of Leptodactylus.

== Species ==
The following species are recognised in the genus Adenomera:

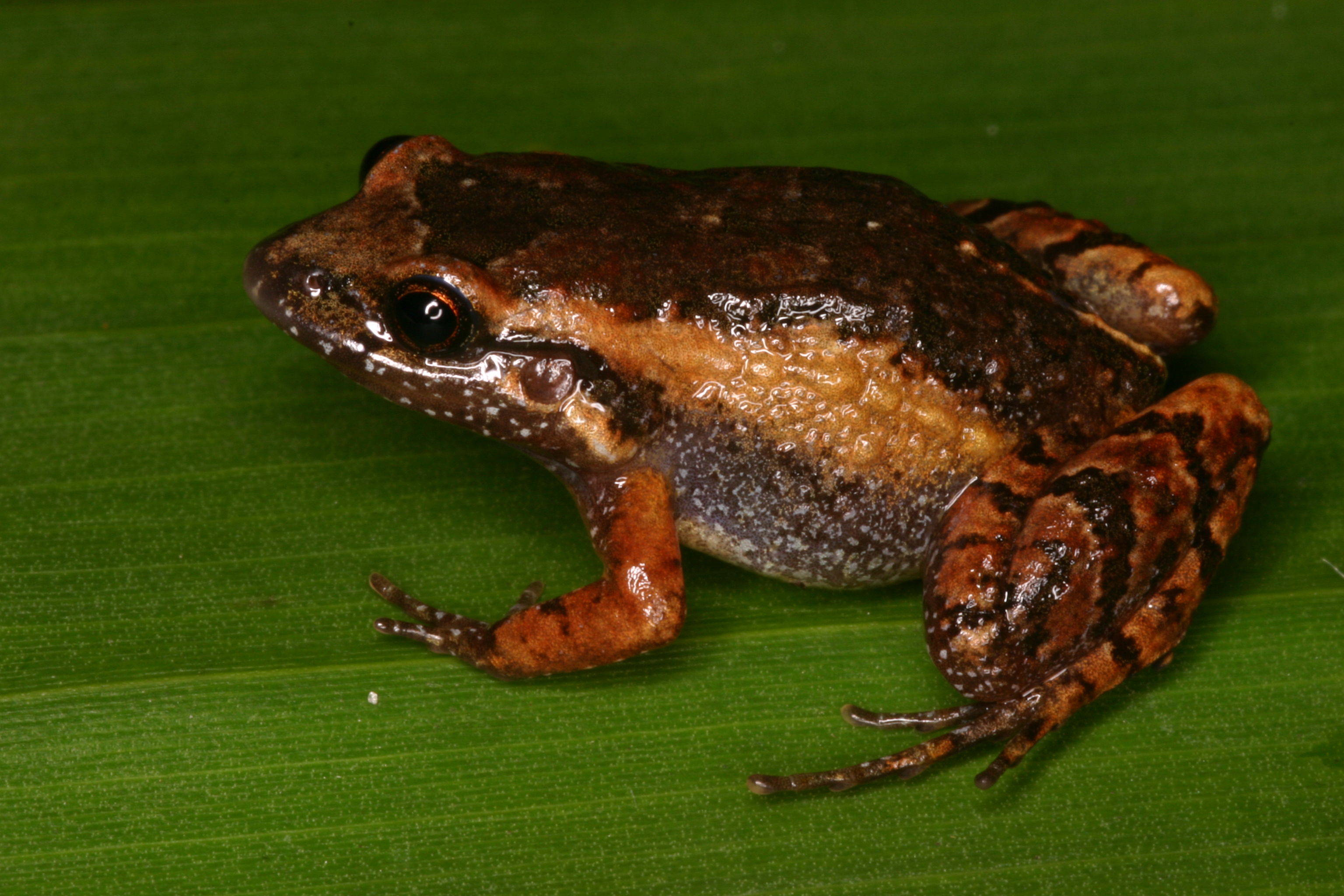
Adenomera kweti

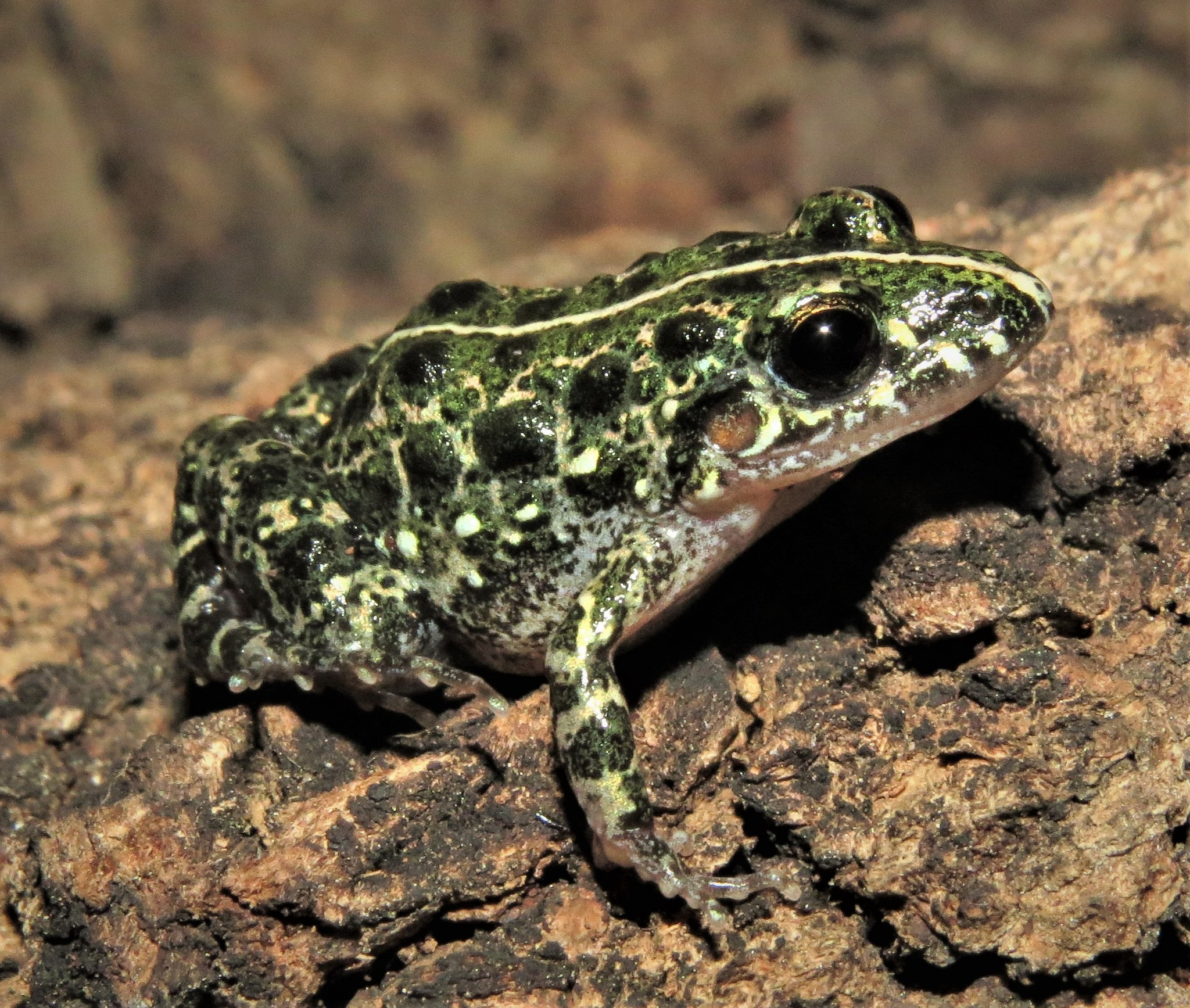
Adenomera saci

- Adenomera ajurauna (Berneck, Costa, and Garcia, 2008)
- Adenomera albarena (Martins, Mônico, Mendonça, Dantas, Souza, Hanken, Lima & Ferrão, 2024)
- Adenomera amicorum (Carvalho et al., 2021)
- Adenomera andreae (Müller, 1923)
- Adenomera araucaria (Kwet and Angulo, 2002)
- Adenomera aurantiaca (Carvalho et al., 2021)
- Adenomera bokermanni (Heyer, 1973)
- Adenomera chicomendesi (Carvalho, Angulo, Kokubum, Barrera, Souza, Haddad, and Giaretta, 2019)
- Adenomera coca (Angulo and Reichle, 2008)
- Adenomera cotuba (Carvalho and Giaretta, 2013)
- Adenomera diptyx (Boettger, 1885)
- Adenomera engelsi (Kwet, Steiner, and Zillikens, 2009)
- Adenomera glauciae (Carvalho, Simões, Gagliardi-Urrutia, Rojas-Runjaic, Haddad & Castroviejo-Fisher, 2020)
- Adenomera gridipappi (Carvalho et al., 2021)
- Adenomera guarani (Zaracho, Lavilla, Carvalho, Motte & Basso, 2023)
- Adenomera guarayo (Carvalho, Angulo, Barrera, Aguilar-Puntriano & Haddad, 2020)
- Adenomera heyeri (Boistel, Massary, and Angulo, 2006)
- Adenomera hylaedactyla (Cope, 1868)
- Adenomera inopinata (Carvalho et al., 2021)
- Adenomera juikitam (Carvalho and Giaretta, 2013)
- Adenomera kayapo (Carvalho et al., 2021)
- Adenomera kweti (Carvalho, Cassini, Taucce, and Haddad, 2019)
- Adenomera lutzi (Heyer, 1975)
- Adenomera marmorata (Steindachner, 1867)
- Adenomera martinezi (Bokermann, 1956)
- Adenomera nana (Müller, 1922)
- Adenomera phonotriccus (Carvalho, Giaretta, Angulo, Haddad, and Peloso, 2019)
- Adenomera saci (Carvalho and Giaretta, 2013)
- Adenomera simonstuarti (Angulo and Icochea, 2010)
- Adenomera tapajonica (Carvalho et al., 2021)
- Adenomera thomei (Almeida and Angulo, 2006)
- Adenomera varcena (Borburema, Moraes, Santos, Ron, Haddad, Giaretta & Carvalho, 2026)
