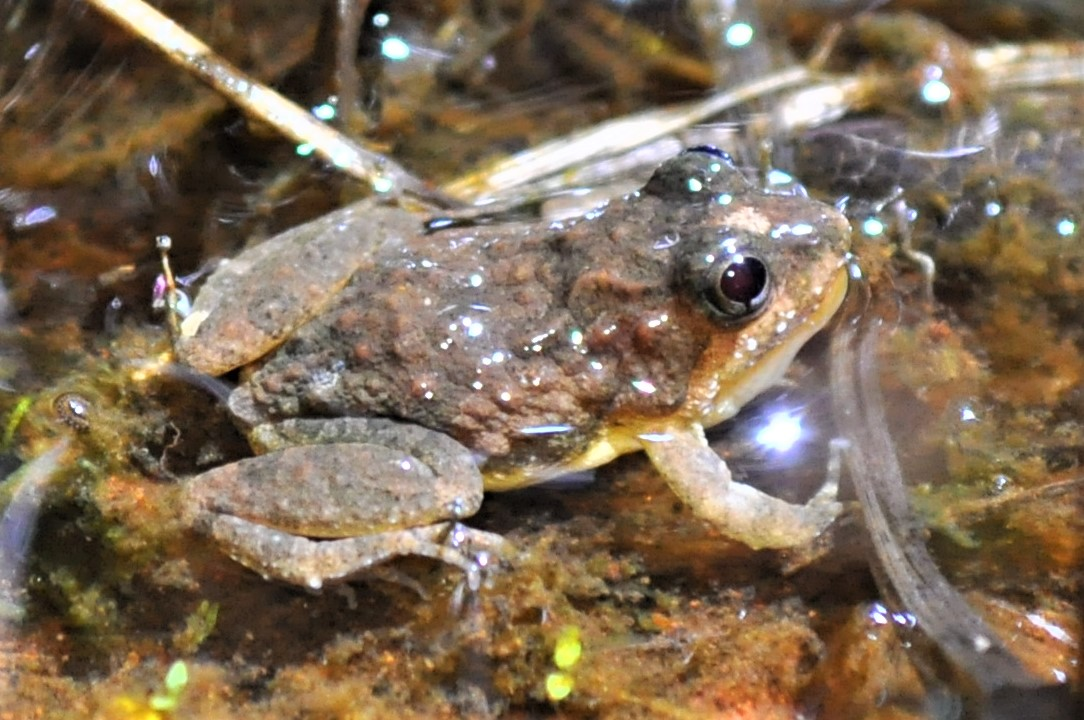

Conservation status
- Least Concern (IUCN 3.1)

Scientific classification
- Kingdom: Animalia
- Phylum: Chordata
- Class: Amphibia
- Order: Anura
- Family: Leptodactylidae
- Genus: Pseudopaludicola
- Species: P. canga

Binomial name
- Pseudopaludicola canga Giaretta & Kokubum, 2003

Synonyms
- Pseudopaludicola canga Giaretta and Kokubum, 2003; Pseudopaludicola parnaiba Roberto, Cardozo, and Ávila, 2013

= Pseudopaludicola canga =

Species of frog

Pseudopaludicola canga is a species of frog in the family Leptodactylidae. It is endemic to Brazil.

== Habitat ==
This frog lives in Cerrado and Amazon biomes. It has been observed in savanna and upland grassland during flood. Scientists have seen it 700 m (2,300 ft) above sea level.

Scientists have reported these frogs in some protected places, such as Área de Proteção Ambiental da Foz do Rio das Preguiças-Pequenos Lencóis - Região Lagunar Adjacente and Floresta Nacional de Carajás.

== Reproduction ==
Scientists infer that the frog reproduces in a manner similar to its congeners: The female frog deposits eggs in pools of water, where the free-swimming tadpoles develop.

== Threats ==
The IUCN classifies this species as least concern of extinction. In some parts of its range, it may be at risk from human projects if those projects involve draining wetlands, particularly agriculture, urbanization, livestock cultivation, and mining.
