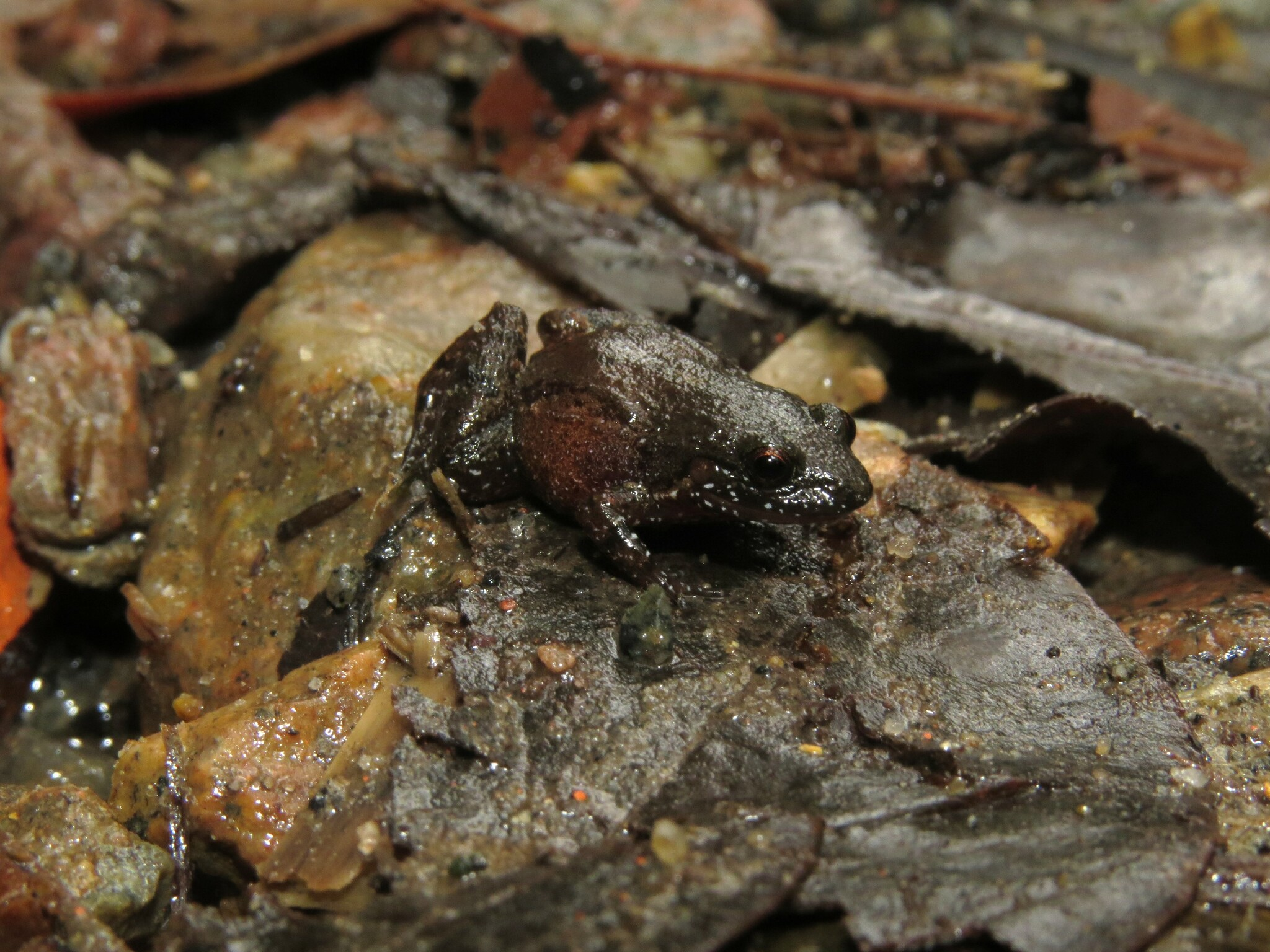

Conservation status
- Least Concern (IUCN 3.1)

Scientific classification
- Kingdom: Animalia
- Phylum: Chordata
- Class: Amphibia
- Order: Anura
- Family: Leptodactylidae
- Genus: Adenomera
- Species: A. bokermanni

Binomial name
- Adenomera bokermanni (Heyer, 1973)

= Adenomera bokermanni =

Species of frog

Adenomera bokermanni is a species of frog in the family Leptodactylidae, the southern frogs. It is endemic to Brazil.

== Habitat ==
This frog lives in Atlantic forest and in Cerrado biomes. It has been found on the leaf litter in primary and secondary forest. Scientists have seen this frog between 0 and 1,700 m (0 and 5,577 ft) meters above sea level.

Scientists have reported these frogs in protected areas.

== Reproduction ==
The tadpoles swim in temporary ponds and pools.

== Threats ==
The IUCN classifies this species as least concern of extinction. In some parts of its range, it may be in some danger from habitat loss associated with logging, agriculture, and lumber cultivation.
