= Adenomera lutzi =

Conservation status
- Endangered (IUCN 3.1)

Scientific classification
- Kingdom: Animalia
- Phylum: Chordata
- Class: Amphibia
- Order: Anura
- Family: Leptodactylidae
- Genus: Adenomera
- Species: A. lutzi

Binomial name
- Adenomera lutzi Heyer, 1975

Synonyms
- Leptodactylus lutzi (Heyer, 1975)

Species of frog

Adenomera lutzi is a species of frog in the family Leptodactylidae. The species is endemic to Guyana. First described from the upper Potaro River based on specimens collected before 1905, it is now known from a number of sites around the Pakaraima Mountains in west-central Guyana. The specific name lutzi honors Adolfo Lutz, a Brazilian medical entomologist and parasitologist and a pioneer of herpetology. The common names Lutz's tropical bullfrog and Lutz's thin-toed frog have been coined for the species.

== Description ==
Adult males of Adenomera lutzi measure 26–34 mm (1.0–1.3 in) and adult females 27–34 mm (1.1–1.3 in) in snout-to-vent length (SVL). The snout is sub-elliptical when seen from above and rounded-acute in profile. The canthus rostralis is rounded. The tympanum is distinct. The toe tips are expanded into small discs but lack circummarginal grooves. The forearms bear tubercles, and the lower surface of the tarsus has distinct, white-tipped tubercles. The dorsal coloration is highly variable, and there are five major forms: (1) dark brown, grey or black ground color without or with a barely discernible pattern, (2) light–medium grey ground color with a well-defined pattern (a strongly marked dark brown–black inter-orbital bar and post-orbital ridges; chevron between shoulders almost continuous with round lumbar spots and irregular dark brown–black markings on the back), (3) as (2) but light grey, brown or reddish brown ground color and lighter, smaller, and much less evident/absent markings on the back, (4) similar to (2) but with dark brown to black mottling instead of well-defined markings on the back, and (5) dark grey to black ground color with large orange–orangish brown oblique lateral stripe, possibly with discernible darker markings. Most specimens have a white stripe that passes from the eye to the arm insertion, sometimes partly encompassing the tympanum. A narrow, yellow mid-dorsal stripe is often present but may be intermittent. The posterior surface of thigh is black with distinct yellow, orange, or red spotting or mottling. The males has a yellow to orangish yellow throat and belly. The vocal sac is internal.

== Reproduction ==
Kok and colleagues hypothesize that the male Adenomera lutzi uses its shovel-shaped snout to excavate underground nesting chambers. Reproduction takes place during the wettest part of the year; excavation of egg chambers requires wet soils. The male advertisement call is a sequence of regular notes repeated about 17–23 times per minute. The dominant frequency is about 3300–3600 Hz. Female fecundity is 3–10 eggs.

== Habitat and conservation ==
Adenomera lutzi occurs in lowland and montane tropical primary forests at elevations of 430–1,500 m (1,410–4,920 ft) above sea level. It is a primarily nocturnal frog that lives in and on leaf litter. Reproduction does not depend on bodies of water.

This species can be locally common. There are no known threats to it. It occurs in an area of undisturbed remote forest, and it is also known from the Kaieteur National Park.
