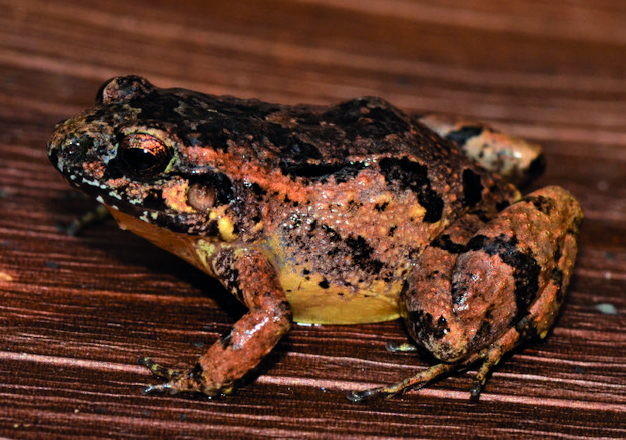
- Amapá, Brazil

Conservation status
- Least Concern (IUCN 3.1)

Scientific classification
- Kingdom: Animalia
- Phylum: Chordata
- Class: Amphibia
- Order: Anura
- Family: Leptodactylidae
- Genus: Adenomera
- Species: A. heyeri

Binomial name
- Adenomera heyeri Boistel, Massary & Angulo, 2006

Synonyms
- Leptodactylus heyeri

= Adenomera heyeri =

Species of amphibian

Adenomera heyeri is a species of frogs in the family Leptodactylidae, the southern frogs. It is native to South America, where it occurs French Guiana, Suriname, and northern Brazil. It probably also occurs in Guyana. This species was first described in 2006.

== Habitat ==
This frog has been observed in nocturnal activity. This frog lives in the Amazon biomes. It has been observed on the leaf litter in primary forest. It has not been observed in disturbed areas, but it is associated with steep gradients. Scientists have seen this frog between 0 and 800 m (0 and 2,625 ft) meters above sea level.

Scientists have seen these frogs in a protected area, Parque Nacional Carrasco.

== Reproduction ==
The male frogs exhibit some territorial behavior. The male frog digs a flask-shaped burrow in which the female deposits her eggs.

== Threats ==
The IUCN classifies this species as least concern of extinction.
