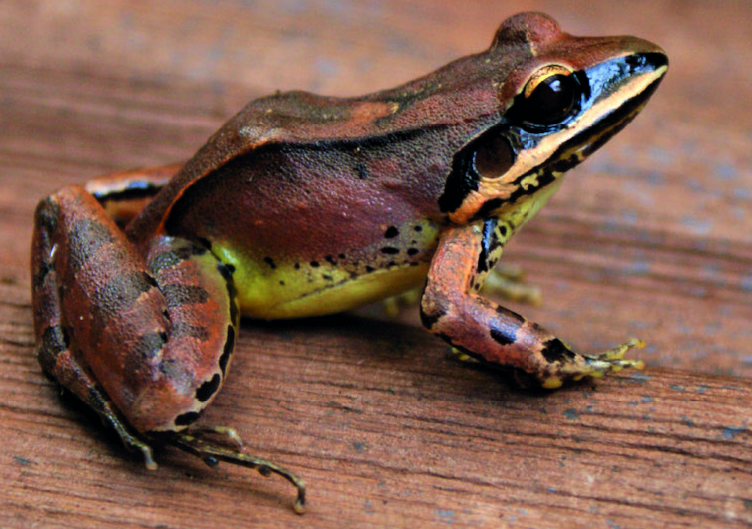

Conservation status
- Least Concern (IUCN 3.1)

Scientific classification
- Kingdom: Animalia
- Phylum: Chordata
- Class: Amphibia
- Order: Anura
- Family: Leptodactylidae
- Genus: Leptodactylus
- Species: L. mystaceus

Binomial name
- Leptodactylus mystaceus (Spix, 1824)

Synonyms
- Leptodactylus amazonicus Heyer, 1978

= Leptodactylus mystaceus =

Species of frog

Leptodactylus mystaceus, also known as the common toad-frog, is a species of frog in the family Leptodactylidae. It is found in northern South America.

== Habitat ==
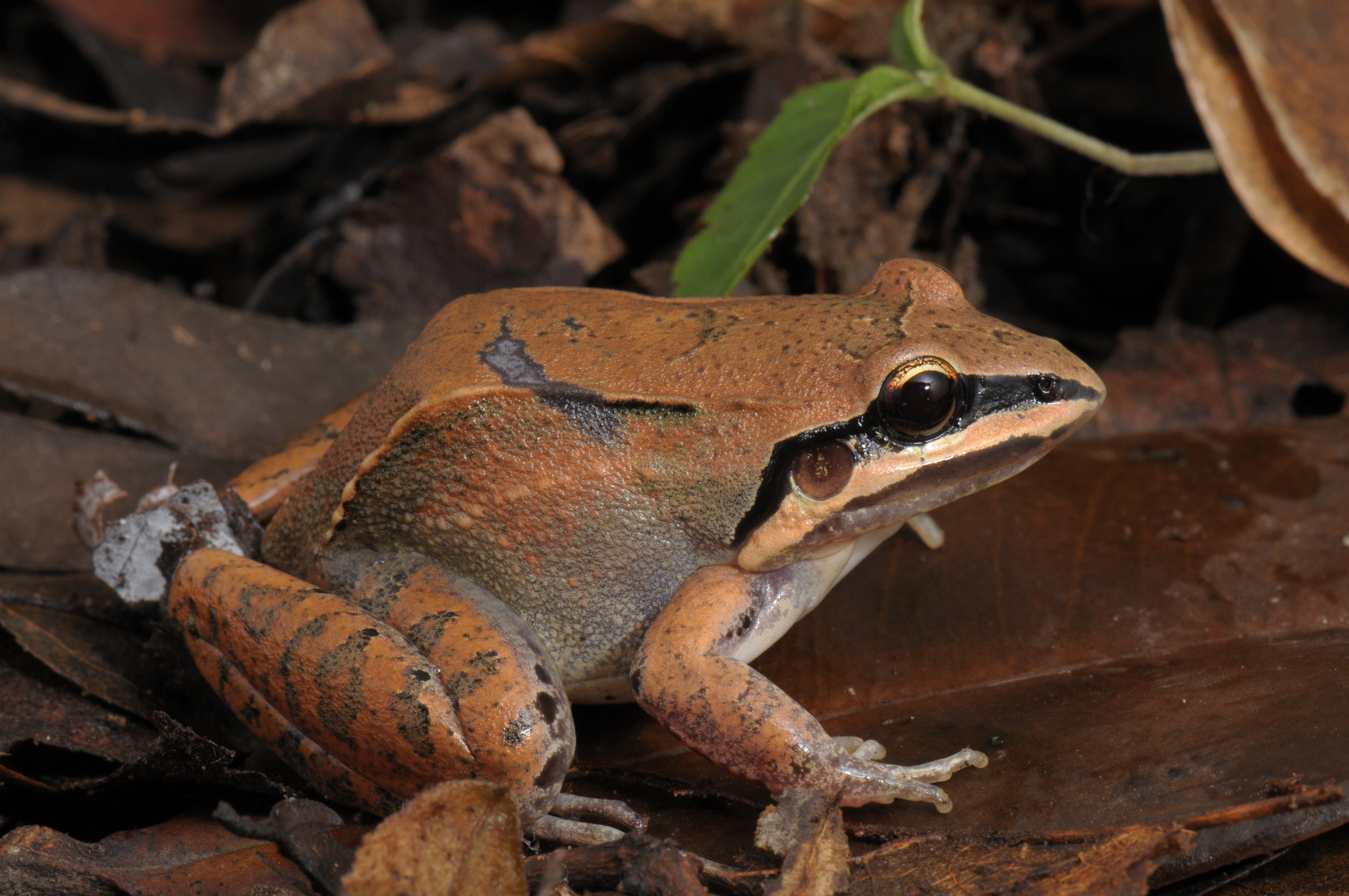
Leptodactylus mystaceus

This frog lives in many parts of the Amazon Basin, including many protected areas. It has been found in primary and secondary forest, grasslands within forests, and flooded areas. It lives on the ground near temporary bodies of water. Scientists saw the frog between 0 and 1000 meters above sea level.

== Reproduction ==
The male frog digs a hole in a muddy area. The female frog makes a foam nest for her eggs. The tadpoles swim and develop in water.

== Threats ==
The IUCN classifies this frog as least concern of extinction. In some parts of its range, it is subject to habitat loss associated with fire, logging, agriculture, and urbanization, but the frog has shown a good tolerance to anthropogenic disturbance.
