= Adenomera martinezi =

Conservation status
- Near Threatened (IUCN 3.1)

Scientific classification
- Kingdom: Animalia
- Phylum: Chordata
- Class: Amphibia
- Order: Anura
- Family: Leptodactylidae
- Genus: Adenomera
- Species: A. martinezi

Binomial name
- Adenomera martinezi (Bokermann, 1956)

Synonyms
- Leptodactylus martinezi Bokermann, 1956; Leptodactylus (Lithodytes) martinezi Bokermann, 1956

Species of frog

Adenomera martinezi is a species of frog in the family Leptodactylidae. It is endemic to Brazil and only known from its type locality, Cachimbo in southwestern Pará. Prior to its redelimitation by Carvalho and Giaretta in 2013, it was believed to be more widespread. Populations of this widespread taxon are now recognized as a distinct species, Adenomera saci.

== Etymology ==
The specific name martinezi honours Antonio Martínez, an Argentine entomologist. Common name Martinez's tropical bullfrog has been coined for this species.

== Description ==
Adult males measure 22–24 mm (0.9–0.9 in) and adult females, based on just one specimen, 26 mm (1.0 in) in snout–vent length. The snout is pointed in dorsal view and acuminate in lateral view; in males, the snout tip has a well-developed, shovel-like fleshy ridge. The tympanum and supratympanic fold are present. The finger tips are rounded but not expanded, without webbing or fringing. The toe tips are unexpanded and unflattened; no webbing is present. Dorsal coloration consists of 4–6 symmetrically arranged rows of longitudinal dark-colored spots on moss green (male) or grayish brown (female) background. Cream-colored vertebral stripe is present. The belly is uniformly yellow. Males have an internal, subgular vocal sac.

The male advertisement call is long (63–151 ms) with 15–21 pulses; it is audibly pulsed even to the human ear.

== Habitat and conservation ==
Adenomera martinezi occurs in grassy field environments associated with rock outcrops in sandy/muddy soil. The type locality is at a transitional Cerrado/Amazonian region. Males call after nightfall within underground chambers or from exposed calling sites, typically among grassy tufts.

Given its very restricted known distribution, Adenomera martinezi is classified as a "near threatened" species. While it has not been reported in any protected parks, it has been seen not far from Reserva Biológica Nascentes Serra do Cachimbo, and its known home near an air force base is not subject to further habitat modification.
