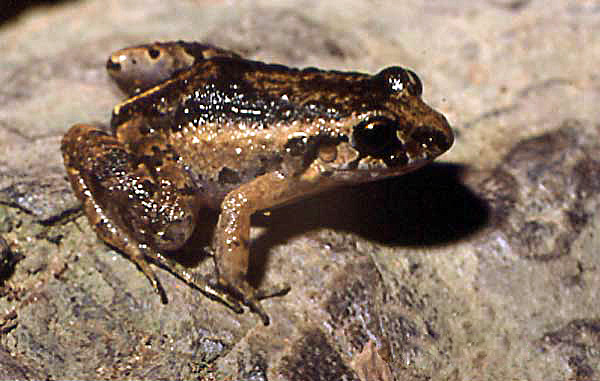

Conservation status
- Least Concern (IUCN 3.1)

Scientific classification
- Kingdom: Animalia
- Phylum: Chordata
- Class: Amphibia
- Order: Anura
- Family: Leptodactylidae
- Genus: Adenomera
- Species: A. andreae

Binomial name
- Adenomera andreae (Müller, 1923)

Synonyms
- Leptodactylus andreae Müller, 1923

= Adenomera andreae =

Species of amphibian

Adenomera andreae (common name: lowland tropical bullfrog, Göldi's thin-toed frog, rana dedilarga de Göldi) is a species of frog in the family Leptodactylidae.

It is found in the lowlands of northern South America east of the Andes (Bolivia, Brazil, Colombia, Ecuador, French Guiana, Guyana, Peru, Suriname, and Venezuela). As currently defined, it probably represents a cryptic species complex, comprising perhaps four species.

== Description ==
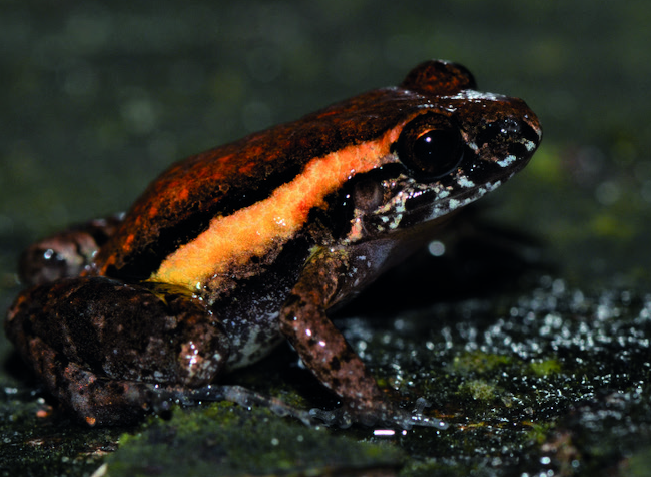
Amapá, Brazil

Adenomera andreae are small frogs, usually less than 30 mm (1.2 in) in adult body length. Dorsum is grayish brown to beige, occasionally with dark brown spots, and rarely with a vertebral dark brown stripe and/or dorsolateral orangish yellow stripe. The ventral surfaces are white. Iris is chestnut.

Eggs are laid in foam nests on the ground. Tadpoles are terrestrial: they are endotrophic and develop in the nest. Recruitment of juveniles is synchronized with rainfall.

Its predators include large tarantulas.

== Habitat ==
This terrestrial frog lives in lowland primary forest with well-drained soil. Scientists saw the frog between 0 and 400 m (0 and 1,312 ft) above sea level. Many subpopulations live in protected areas.

== Threats ==
The IUCN classifies this frog as least concern of extinction. However, it is subject to habitat loss and habitat and population fragmentation from clear-cutting. The fungus Batrachochytrium dendrobatidis has been detected in these frogs and confirmed to cause clinical symptoms of chytridiomycosis, but it is not clear if the disease is lethal to this species.
