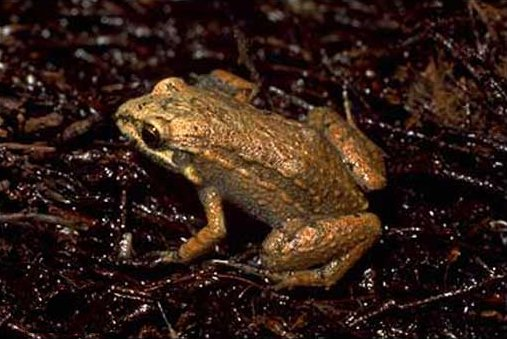

Conservation status
- Least Concern (IUCN 3.1)

Scientific classification
- Kingdom: Animalia
- Phylum: Chordata
- Class: Amphibia
- Order: Anura
- Family: Leptodactylidae
- Genus: Adenomera
- Species: A. araucaria

Binomial name
- Adenomera araucaria Kwet and Angulo, 2002

Synonyms
- Leptodactylus araucaria (Kwet and Angulo, 2002)

= Adenomera araucaria =

Species of frog

Adenomera araucaria is a species of frog in the family Leptodactylidae. It is endemic to southern Brazil, where it occurs in the southern part of the Serra Geral in the states of Santa Catarina and Rio Grande do Sul.

== Description ==
Adult males measure 17–19 mm (0.67–0.75 in) and adult females 19–20 mm (0.75–0.79 in) in snout–vent length. The body is robust and the limbs are short. In males, the snout is subelliptical or nearly acuminate in dorsal view, but more rounded in females. The tympanum is distinct, but the supra-tympanic fold is poorly developed. The canthus rostralis is rounded and indistinct. The finger tips are rounded whereas the toe tips are slightly swollen, but neither have discs. No webbing is present. Skin is smooth, but a distinct lateral fold, broken into small glandular segments, runs from the eye over the tympanum to the groin. Dorsal coloration is variable, with various shades light or dark brown, orange-brown, tan, or gray. There is a usually inconspicuous pattern of longitudinally arranged, irregular, dark marks. A light mid-dorsal stripe is usually present. The venter is usually white with some gray dotting, but occasionally very dark with many melanophores.

The male advertisement call is a frequency-modulated signal, with an upward frequency sweep.

== Habitat and conservation ==
This occurs on the plateaus and in the coastal mountains of the Serra Geral range at elevations of 300–1,100 m (980–3,610 ft) above sea level. It lives in forests and pine plantations. It is associated with Araucaria angustifolia trees. Males call from the ground, mostly hidden among roots, stones, and fallen branches. Calling takes place between early afternoon and midnight, especially after showers. Because the species has not been observed close to water, it is assumed that reproduction involves foam nests and non-feeding larvae, as is common in related species.

This species has a limited distribution, but it is common in its range and its populations are thought to be stable. It is also known from several protected areas: Área de Proteção Ambiental da Serra da Esperanca, Área de Proteção Ambiental do Alto Rio Turvo, Floresta Nacional de São Francisco de Paula, Parque Estadual Itapeva, Parque Estadual Serra Furada, Parque Nacional da Serra do Itajai, and Parque Nacional de Aparados da Serra.
