= Adenomera ajurauna =

Conservation status
- Least Concern (IUCN 3.1)

Scientific classification
- Kingdom: Animalia
- Phylum: Chordata
- Class: Amphibia
- Order: Anura
- Family: Leptodactylidae
- Genus: Adenomera
- Species: A. ajurauna

Binomial name
- Adenomera ajurauna (Berneck, Costa, and Garcia, 2008)

Synonyms
- Leptodactylus ajurauna Berneck, Costa, and Garcia, 2008

Species of frog

Adenomera ajurauna is a species of frog in the family Leptodactylidae. It is endemic to Brazil.

== Description ==
This frog measures 17.18–19.95 mm in snout-vent length. The skin of the dorsum is brown in color. This frog has a dark brown throat. The iris of the eye is bronze in color. Some individual frogs are lighter in color. These have a triangular intraorbital mark.

== Etymology ==
Scientists named this frog ajurauna from the indigenous Tupi language's ajura for "throat" and una for "black."

== Habitat ==
This frog lives in Atlantic forest biomes. It has also been seen in forest fragments and next to eucalyptus tree farms. Scientists have seen this frog between 0 and 700 m (0 and 2,297 ft) meters above sea level.

Scientists have seen these frogs in protected places, including Parque Estadual da Serra do Mar and Parque Estadual Carlos Botelho.

== Reproduction ==
The male frog perches on the ground or leaf litter and calls to the female frogs. This frog deposits its eggs in holes underground, where the tadpoles develop.

== Threats ==
The IUCN classifies this frog as least concern of extinction. In some places, people build towns in the frog's habitat.
