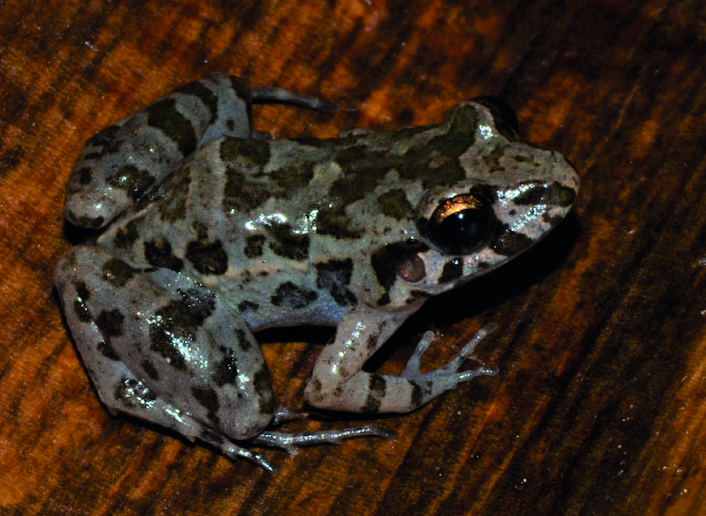
- Amapá, Brazil

Conservation status
- Least Concern (IUCN 3.1)

Scientific classification
- Kingdom: Animalia
- Phylum: Chordata
- Class: Amphibia
- Order: Anura
- Family: Leptodactylidae
- Genus: Adenomera
- Species: A. hylaedactyla

Binomial name
- Adenomera hylaedactyla (Cope, 1868)

Synonyms
- Leptodactylus diptyx Boettger, 1885; Leptodactylus glandulosus Cope, 1887; Leptodactylus hololius Boulenger, 1918; Leptodactylus melini Lutz & Kloss, 1952; Leptodactylus minutus Noble, 1923; Leptodactylus poeppigi Melin, 1941

= Adenomera hylaedactyla =

Species of frog

The dark-spotted thin-toed frog, Napo tropical bullfrog, or rana dedilarga de manchas oscuras (Adenomera hylaedactyla) is a species of frog in the family Leptodactylidae. It is found in Argentina, Bolivia, Brazil, Colombia, Ecuador, French Guiana, Guyana, Paraguay, Peru, Suriname, Trinidad and Tobago, and Venezuela.

== Description ==
This frog is small. The adult male measures 22-24 mm long in snout-vent length and the adult female frog 26-27 mm. The skin of the dorsum is brown in color with many dark marks. There are two distinct folds of skin on each side of the body. The belly and throat are white in color. The lower parts and fronts of the back legs are yellowish in color. The iris of the eye is bronze in color.

== Habitat ==
This terrestrial frog is found in open areas, such as next to rivers and agricultural clearings. Mostly, it is associated with primary and secondary forest. Scientists have seen it between 0 and 1,000 m (0 and 3,281 ft) meters above sea level.

Scientists have seen these frogs in protected places.

== Reproduction ==
The female frog desposits her eggs in a foam nest underground. The tadpoles develop in the nest, feeding solely from the yolk sac.

== Threats ==
The IUCN classifies this frog as least concern of extinction. It has shown considerable tolerance to disturbed and cleared habitats.

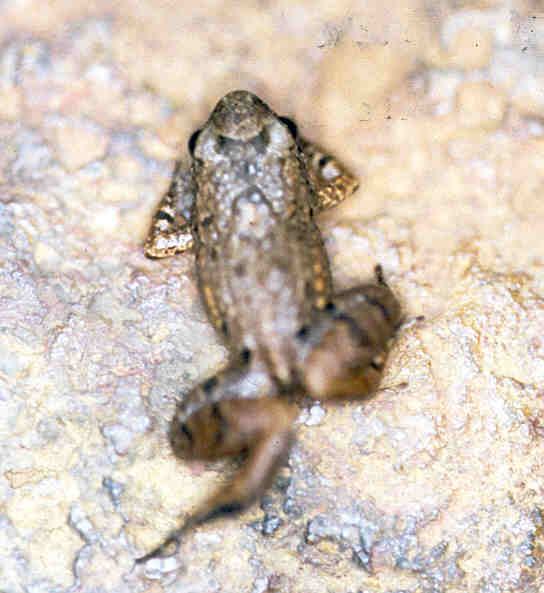
