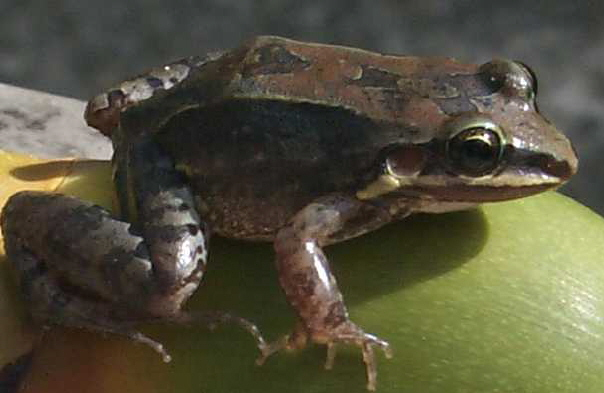
- Leptodactylus albilabris

Scientific classification
- Domain: Eukaryota
- Kingdom: Animalia
- Phylum: Chordata
- Class: Amphibia
- Order: Anura
- Family: Leptodactylidae
- Subfamily: Leptodactylinae; Werner, 1896

Diversity
- 4 genera (see text)

= Leptodactylinae =

Subfamily of amphibians

The Leptodactylinae are a subfamily of leptodactylid frogs distributed between southern North America (Texas, USA, and Sonora, Mexico) and South America to Brazil. Their sister taxon is the clade comprising the Leiuperinae and Paratelmatobiinae.

== Genera ==
The four genera in the subfamily are:

- Adenomera Steindachner, 1867
- Hydrolaetare Gallardo, 1963
- Leptodactylus Fitzinger, 1826
- Lithodytes Fitzinger, 1843
