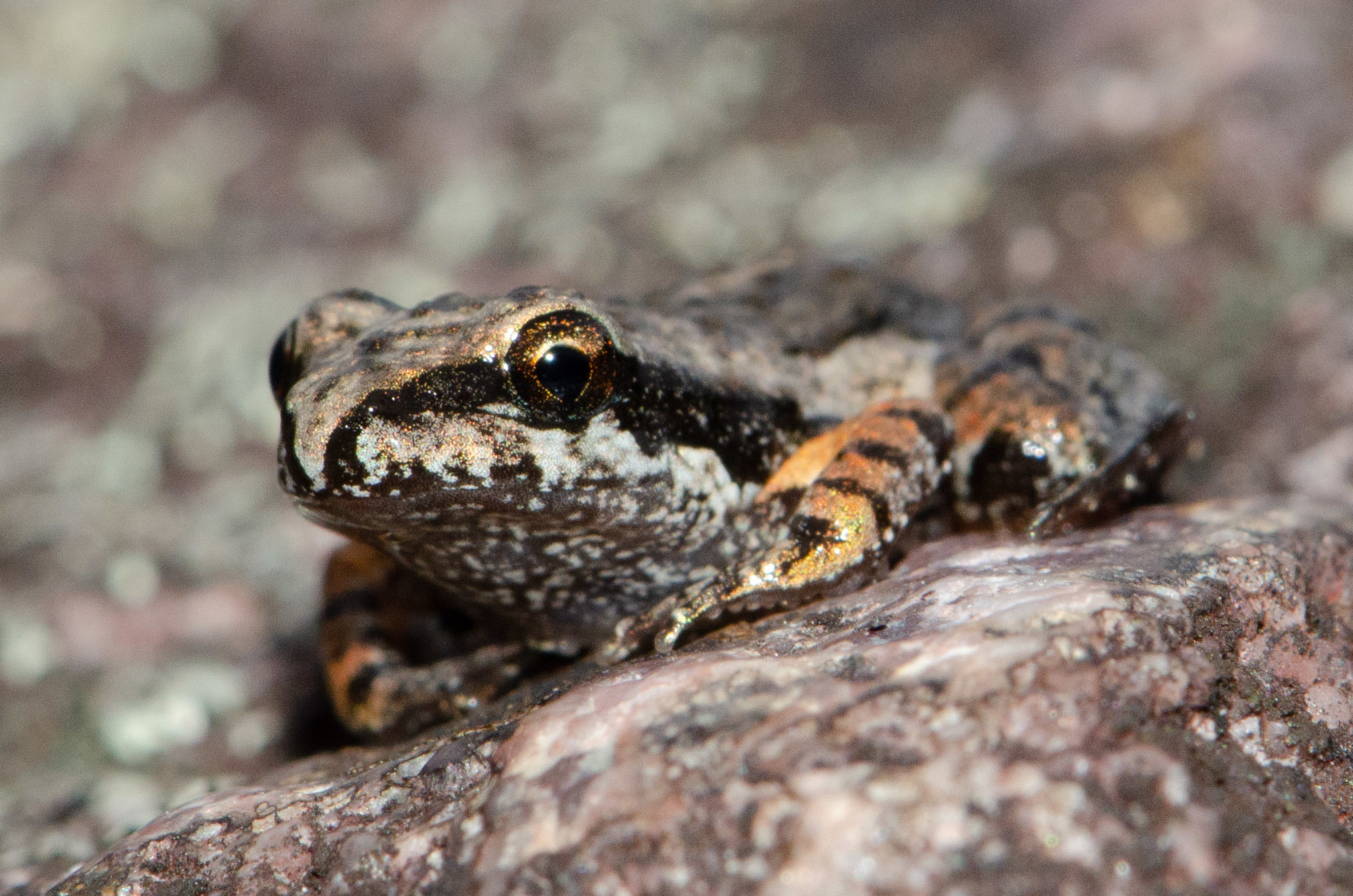

Conservation status
- Vulnerable (IUCN 3.1)

Scientific classification
- Kingdom: Animalia
- Phylum: Chordata
- Class: Amphibia
- Order: Anura
- Family: Leptodactylidae
- Subfamily: Paratelmatobiinae
- Genus: Rupirana; Heyer, 1999
- Species: R. cardosoi

Binomial name
- Rupirana cardosoi Heyer, 1999

= Rupirana =

Genus of amphibians

Rupirana is a genus of frogs in the family Leptodactylidae. It is monotypic, being represented by the singles species Rupirana cardosoi. The specific name cardosoi honors Adão José Cardoso, a Brazilian herpetologist. It is endemic to northern Espinhaço Mountains, Bahia, Brazil.

== Etymology ==
Scientists named this frog cardosoi for Adão José Cardoso, a Brazilian herpetologist.

== Habitat ==
This frog lives in the northern Espinhaço Mountains, in Bahia, Brazil. This frog lives next to small streams with white sandy bottoms, where it has been found near grassy vegetation. It has been reported at high elevations, between 900 and 1,200 m (2,950 and 3,940 ft) above sea level in Caatinga and campos rupestres places. Some of this population has been found inside Chapada Diamantina National Park and Morro do Chápeu State Park.

== Reproduction ==
The frog reproduces in temporary bodies of water with rocks or sand on the bottom. The female frog has a clutch of about 120 eggs. The tadpoles swim near the bottom.

== Threats ==
The IUCN classifies the frog as vulnerable to extinction. It is threatened by anthropogenic habitat loss in favor of agriculture and livestock grazing. Because animals can graze even in the high, rocky places that the frog inhabits, this is a threat even in remote areas. People often convert forest to farms and pasture by setting fires, which can spread to other areas, including protected parks. Tourism can also affect this frog.

Climate change is also an issue. This frog depends on humid stream microhabitats. These places can change quickly if the climate changes.
