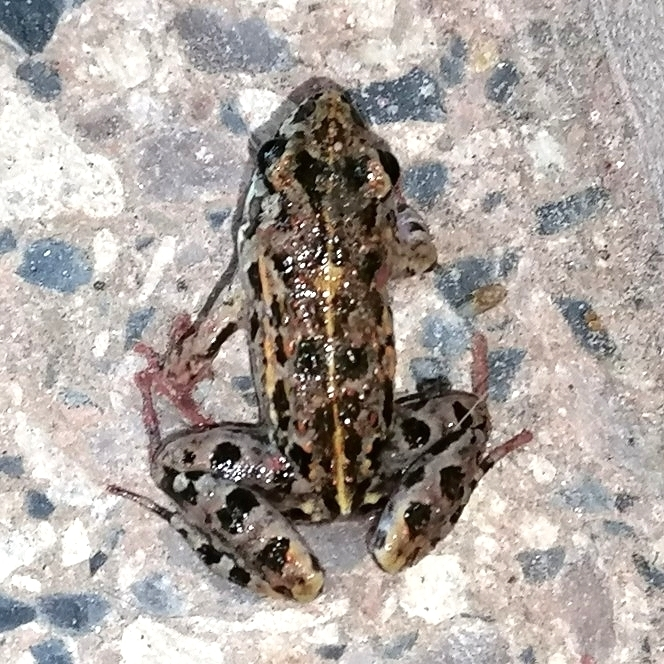

Conservation status
- Least Concern (IUCN 3.1)

Scientific classification
- Kingdom: Animalia
- Phylum: Chordata
- Class: Amphibia
- Order: Anura
- Family: Leptodactylidae
- Genus: Adenomera
- Species: A. diptyx

Binomial name
- Adenomera diptyx (Boettger, 1885)

Synonyms
- Leptodactylus diptyx Boettger, 1885; Leptodactylus glandulosus Cope, 1887

= Adenomera diptyx =

Species of frog

Adenomera diptyx is a species of frog in the family Leptodactylidae. It is native to northern Argentina, Paraguay, eastern Bolivia, and southern Brazil. It was resurrected from the synonymy of Adenomera hylaedactyla in 1996.

== Habitat ==
Adenomera diptyx is a common species. It is adaptable, found in the Pantanal biome but also many other living in many types of habitats at elevations of 50–900 m (160–2,950 ft) above sea level. It is tolerant to anthropogenic disturbance and sometimes even seen in gardens. Scientists have seen the frog in protected areas, including Chapada dos Guimarães Protection Area.

== Reproduction ==
The male frog perches on grasses or other vegetation near flooded grassland or other temporary bodies of water and calls to the female frog. The eggs are deposited in a foam nest underground and the tadpoles are carried to water.

== Threats ==
The IUCN classifies this frog as least concern of extinction. In some areas, it is threatened by fires and habitat loss associated with cattle ranching and infrastructure construction.
