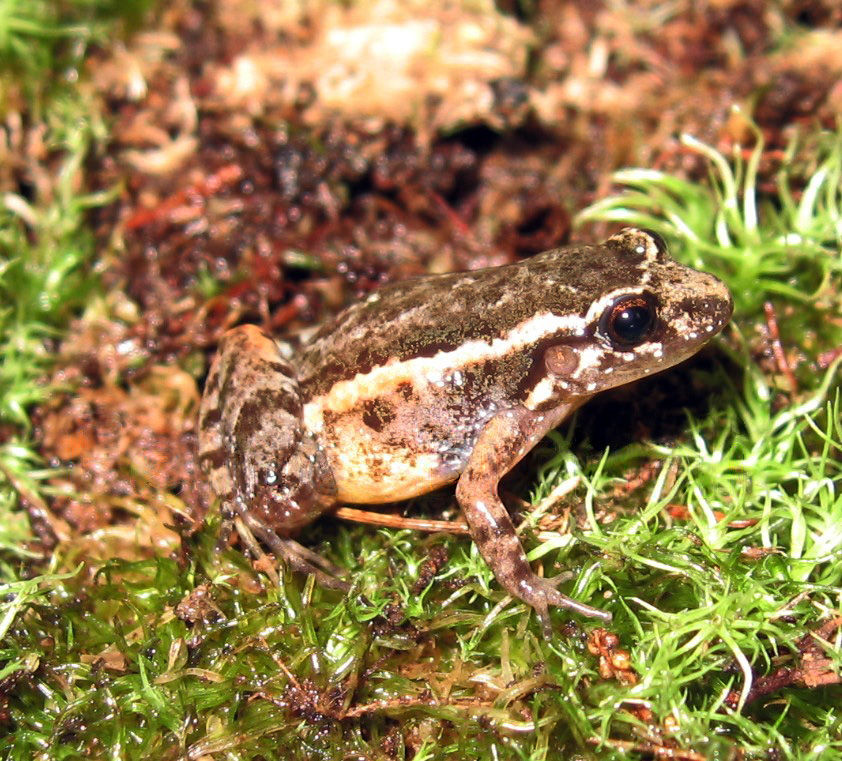

Conservation status
- Least Concern (IUCN 3.1)

Scientific classification
- Kingdom: Animalia
- Phylum: Chordata
- Class: Amphibia
- Order: Anura
- Family: Leptodactylidae
- Genus: Leptodactylus
- Species: L. marmoratus

Binomial name
- Leptodactylus marmoratus Steindachner, 1867

Synonyms
- Leptodactylus nanus; Adenomera marmorata Steindachner, 1867; Leptodactylus trivittatus Lutz, 1926; Leptodactylus marmoratus marmoratus Rivero 1961

= Leptodactylus marmoratus =

Species of amphibian

Leptodactylus marmoratus, commonly known as the marbled tropical bullfrog, is a common species of frog in the family Leptodactylidae. It is commonly found under and on the surface of dead leaf litter and dead branches.

== Behavior and diet ==
This bullfrog has a distinctive call that it sounds from dusk to dawn. It is nocturnal. It feeds on isopods, ants, and insect larvae that are found in abundance in their habitats.

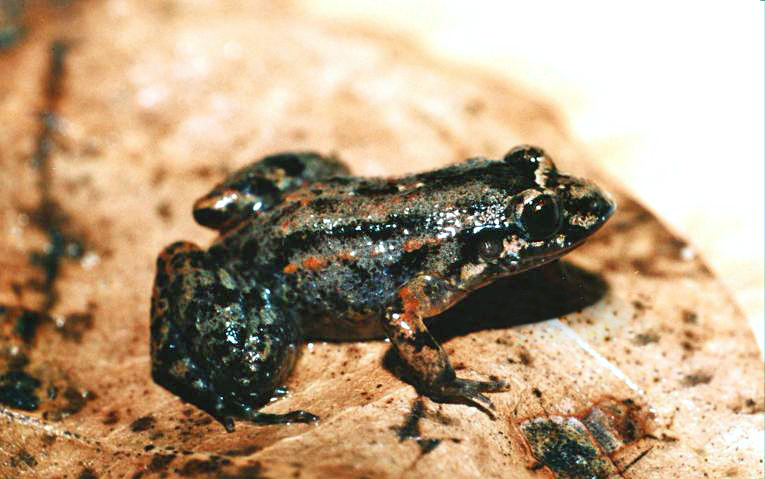
Individual frogs of this species may differ in appearance.

== Distribution ==
It is endemic to southern Brazil in the states of Minas Gerais, Rio de Janeiro, São Paulo, and Paraná. Scientists have seen it between 0 and 1,200 m (0 and 3,937 ft) meters above sea level. Its natural habitats are subtropical or tropical moist lowland forests, subtropical or tropical moist montane forests, and rural gardens. It is threatened by habitat loss caused by agriculture and human intrusion but is considered to be of least concern.
