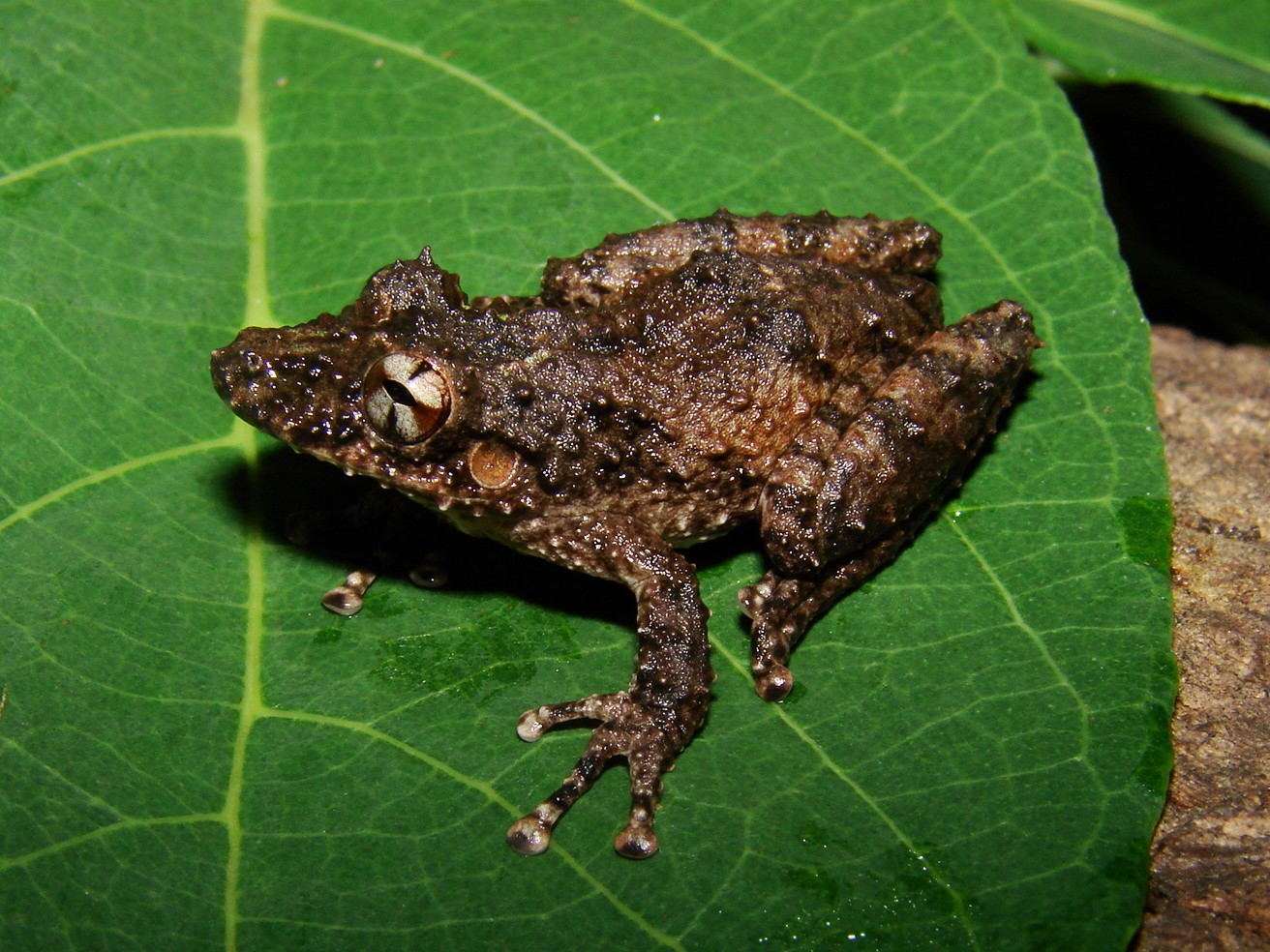

Conservation status
- Least Concern (IUCN 3.1)

Scientific classification
- Kingdom: Animalia
- Phylum: Chordata
- Class: Amphibia
- Order: Anura
- Family: Hylidae
- Genus: Scinax
- Species: S. constrictus

Binomial name
- Scinax constrictus Lima, Bastos & Giaretta, 2004

= Scinax constrictus =

Species of frog

Scinax constrictus is a species of frog in the family Hylidae.

It is endemic to Brazil. Its natural habitats are dry savanna and freshwater marshes. It is threatened by habitat loss.
