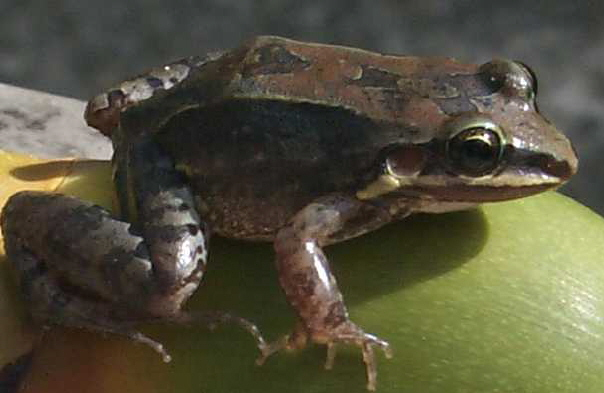

Conservation status
- Least Concern (IUCN 3.1)

Scientific classification
- Kingdom: Animalia
- Phylum: Chordata
- Class: Amphibia
- Order: Anura
- Family: Leptodactylidae
- Genus: Leptodactylus
- Species: L. albilabris

Binomial name
- Leptodactylus albilabris (Günther, 1859)

Synonyms
- Cystignathus albilabris Günther, 1859; Leptodactylus dominicensis Cochran, 1923

= Leptodactylus albilabris =

Species of amphibian

Leptodactylus albilabris is a species of frog in the family Leptodactylidae.

== Common names ==
Its local name is ranita de labio blanco or sapito de labio blanco ("white-lipped froglet") and English name either Gunther's white-lipped frog, Antillean white-lipped frog or Hispaniolan ditch frog.

== Distribution ==
It is found in the Dominican Republic on Hispaniola, Puerto Rico, the British Virgin Islands, and the U.S. Virgin Islands.

== Description ==
The white-lipped frog is a terrestrial (living on the ground) smooth-bodied frog (not warty like a toad) which passes through a tadpole stage. The tadpoles are brown colored, reaching about 1.5 inches (38 millimeters) in length. L. albilabris can be recognized by its white upper lip (hence the name albilabris), webless fingers and toes, black streak between the eyes and the tip of the snout and between eye and shoulder. In general, adults grow to 1.4 inches (3.6 centimeters) in snout-vent length, but like other Puerto Rican frogs the body size increases with elevation and adults of a snout-vent length greater than 2.0 inches (5.1 centimeters) are not rare in the higher regions of the El Yunque National Forest. Individuals have a grayish brown background color with dorsal lines and bands of various shades of brown, cream, and reddish brown. It is white ventrally, and some males have many dark spots on the throat. Its voice is a "pink-pink-pink" sound usually heard from a muddy area.

== Habits ==
The frog's diet includes insects, millipedes and land snails. It lays terrestrial eggs, but they are laid in a foam nest on the ground, usually under a rock or log. Eggs develop into tadpoles, which are washed away by the first rains and finish their development in temporary pools, or bodies of water with low or no water movement.

== Habitat ==
This frog can usually be found in muddy areas near streams, marshes and ditches.

== Relationship to humans ==
People farm this frog for sale as food.
