= Bubble nest =

Nest built by some fish and frog species to protect their eggs

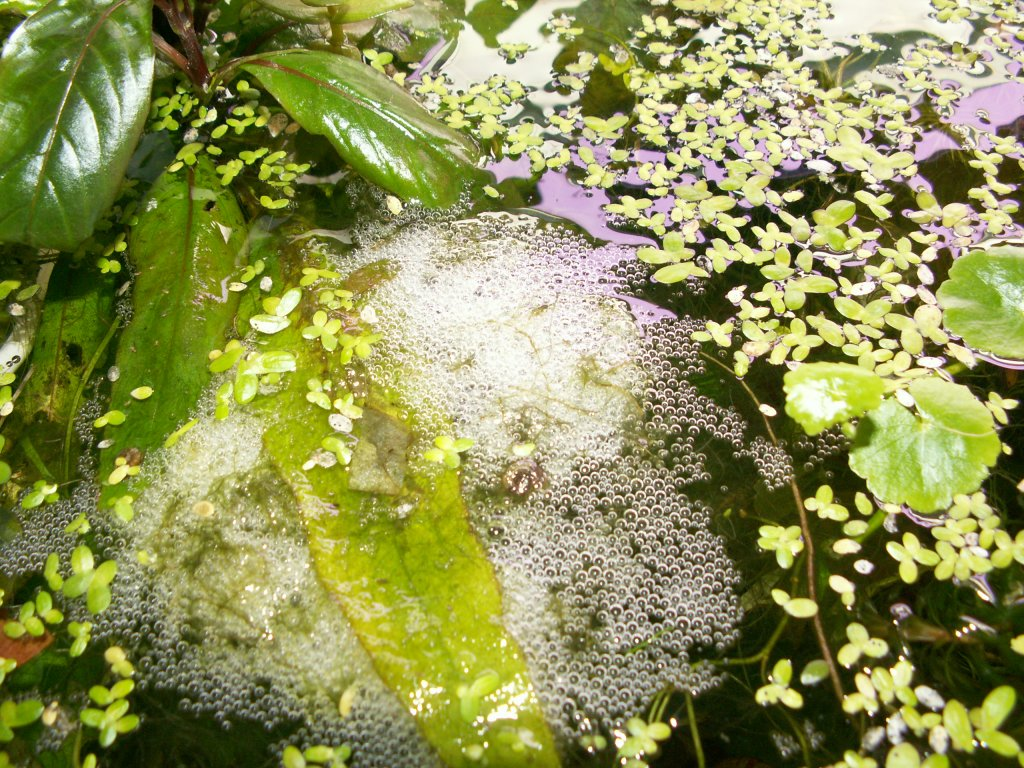
Dwarf gourami bubble nest made of bubbles, floating plants and plant parts which were torn from a Hydrocotyle by the gourami male.

Bubble nests, also called foam nests, are created by some fish and frog species as floating masses of bubbles blown with an oral secretion, saliva bubbles, and occasionally aquatic plants. Fish that build and guard bubble nests are known as aphrophils. Aphrophils include gouramis (including Betta species) and the synbranchid eel Monopterus alba in Asia, Microctenopoma (Anabantidae), Polycentropsis (Nandidae), and Hepsetus odoe (the only member of Hepsetidae) in Africa, and callichthyines and the electric eel in South America. Most, if not all, fish that construct floating bubble nests live in tropical, oxygen-depleted standing waters. Osphronemidae, containing the bettas and gouramis, are the most commonly recognized family of bubble nest makers, though some members of that family mouthbrood instead. The nests are constructed as a place for fertilized eggs to be deposited while incubating and guarded by one or both parents (usually solely the male) until the fry hatch.

Bubble nests can also be found in the habitats of domesticated male betta fish. Nests found in these types of habitats indicate a healthy and happy fish.

== Construction and Nest Characteristics ==
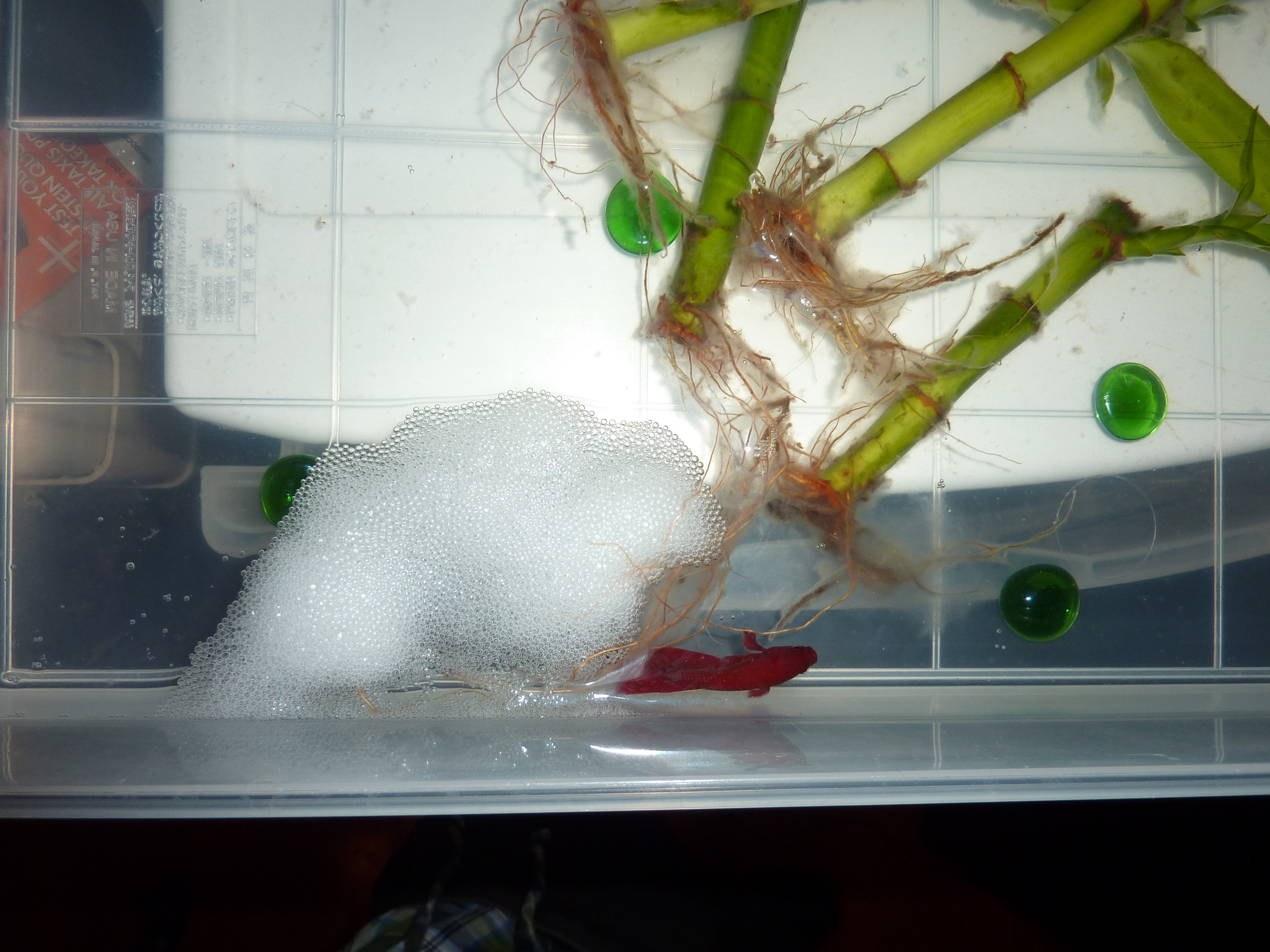
Betta splendens builds nests of varying sizes

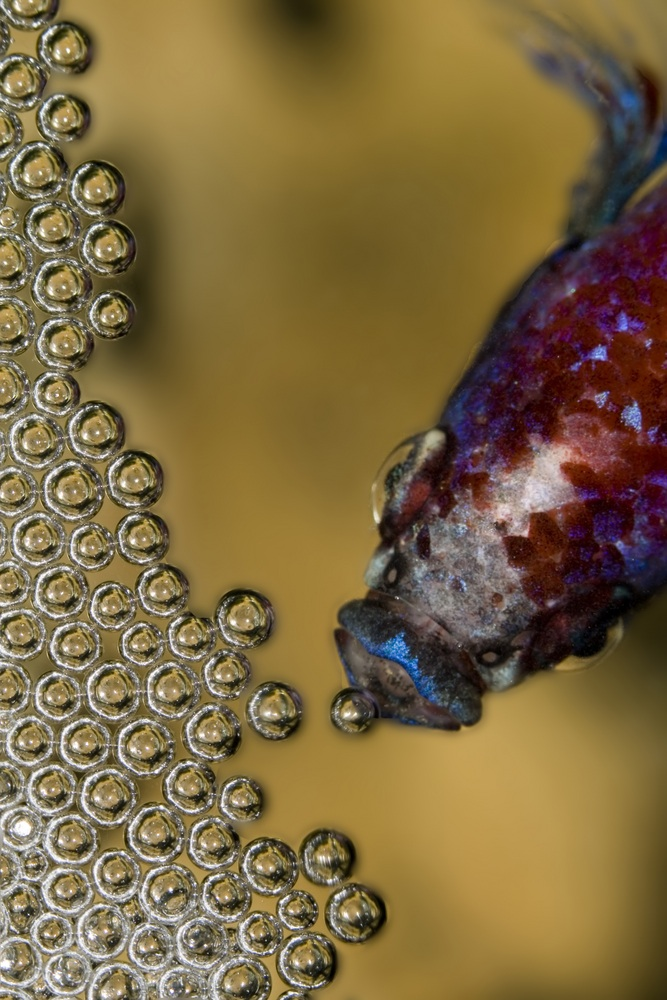
Male Betta with Bubbles.

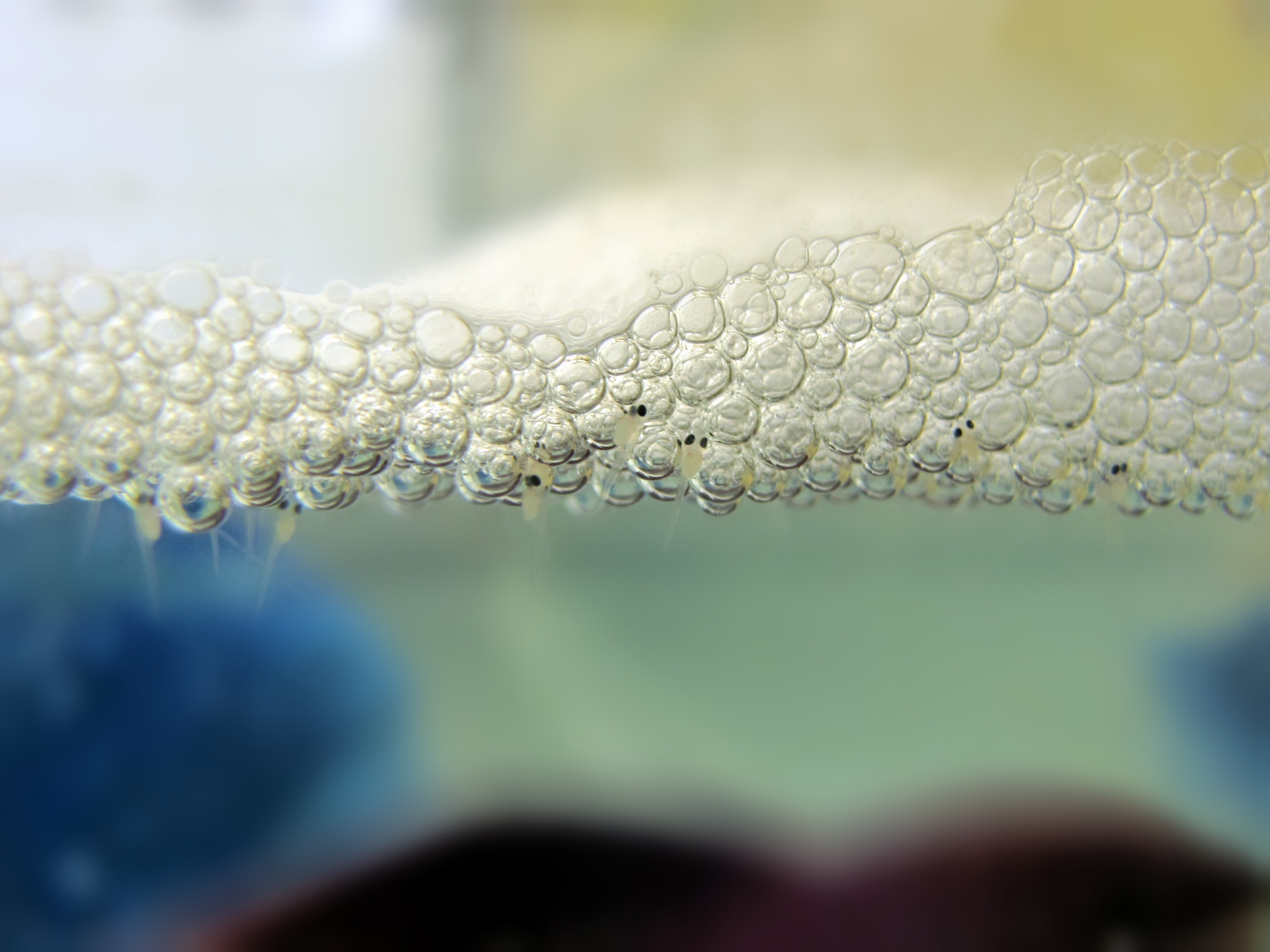
Betta splendens fry in a bubble nest

Bubble nests are built even when not in presence of female or fry (though often a female swimming past will trigger the frantic construction of the nest). Males will build bubble nests of various sizes and thicknesses, depending on the male's territory and personality. Some males build constantly, some occasionally, some when introduced to a female and some do not even begin until after spawning. Some nests will be large, some small, some thick. Nest size does not directly correlate with number of eggs.

Bigger males build larger bubble nests. Large bubble nests are able to handle more eggs and larval fish and thus can only be handled by larger males. Larger males are also able to be more successful in protecting their eggs and juvenile fish from predators.

Most nests are found in shallow bodies and marginal areas of water. These areas are typically slow water habitats with dense vegetation. Water in these areas is often differentiated by having a higher temperature, lower salinity, oxygen level and alkalinity (e.g. acidic).

The use of shallow and marginal waters is because most larger predatory fish are more likely to be restricted to deeper waters, which helps keep the predator threat and competition low. Water temperatures in shallow water typically have a more rapid rate of change (because the infrared heat from the sun has much less effect as water levels deepen) leading to better temperatures for breeding and egg development. Warm water increases the frequency of nest building and of female spawning.

The use of shallow water is also because fertilized eggs need to be aerated in order to hatch successfully.

Various stimuli have been shown to affect onset the construction of bubble nests, such as rapid changes in temperature, barometric changes, fluctuations in rainfall, various fish tank materials, and presence of other males or females.

The nests are built by the male (sometimes females) and their size, position and shape depends on the species. They are often built near an object that breaks the surface of the water, which forms a base for the nest.

Bubble nests created by male Siamese fighting fish (Betta splendens) are made from air bubbles coated with saliva to increase durability. The creation of the bubbles is audible and often frantic.

== Bubble nests and breeding ==
Males are responsible for building the nests, courting females, defending the territory and caring for the developing fish and newly hatched larval fish. Most, if not all, species of bubble nesting fish continue parental care after construction of the floating bubble nest and spawning. After spawning the eggs either float up into the bubble nest, or (in the case of sinking eggs) are carried there, and subsequently lodged into the nest by one or both parents. Following this, the male protects the brood by chasing away the female (if not a species in which the female also guards the nest) and any other intruders, concentrating on the eggs in the nest, retrieving any eggs or fry that fall from the nest and keeping the nest in repair. Only a handful of bubble nest makers (notably some snakeheads) have females participate in bubble nest maintenance. One or both parents will guard the eggs constantly until the fry hatch after 24–48 hours and be suspended from the nest. The newly hatched fry will then be tended by the parent fish until they are independent, which can take from a day to several weeks depending on the species.

== Frogs ==
In some frog species, bubble nests function not only as protective environments for developing embryos but also as sites of ongoing parental investment. For example, male Chiasmocleis leucosticta, a microhylid frog from South America, have been observed returning to their foam nests after initial construction to rewhip and aerate the bubbles over several days. This behavior likely serves to maintain oxygenation and structural integrity of the nest, which in turn may improve hatching success.

Environmental conditions also influence the timing and success of bubble nesting. In Leptodactylus vastus, a leptodactylid frog in Brazil, nest construction was found to be tightly synchronized with rainfall events, particularly those that fill temporary pools.

== See also ==
- Spawn (biology)
