= Célio Fernando Baptista Haddad =

- Born: 5 December 1959 (age 66)
- Education: University of Campinas
- Known for: Research on anuran taxonomy, systematics, phylogeny, evolution, behavior, and conservation
- Awards: Jabuti Prize (1993, 2014)
- Scientific career
- Fields: Herpetology, zoology
- Workplaces: São Paulo State University (UNESP)

Célio Fernando Baptista Haddad (born 5 December 1959) is a Brazilian biologist specializing in herpetology, as well as a writer and professor.

He completed his undergraduate degree in biological sciences in 1982 at the University of Campinas, where he also completed a master's degree in 1987 and a doctorate in ecology in 1991. He is a full professor in the Department of Zoology at São Paulo State University in Rio Claro and a full member of the Brazilian Academy of Sciences. He has won two Jabuti Prizes, the first in 1993 for the book História Natural da Serra do Japi and the second in 2014 for the book Guia dos Anfíbios da Mata Atlântica.

He is a recognized zoologist specializing in the taxonomy, systematics, phylogenetics, evolution, behavior, and conservation of anurans. As of mid-2017, Haddad had been the author of the descriptions of more than 50 species of these animals.

He coordinated a research group at UNESP studying the reproduction of the São Paulo tree frog (Thoropa taophora).

In 2021, he participated in a study on amphibian reproductive modes, documenting 74 distinct forms known to science.
