= Ariovaldo Antonio Giaretta =

Brazilian herpetologist (born 1966)

Ariovaldo Antônio Giaretta
- Born: 17 April 1966 (age 60)
- Known for: Discovery and description of amphibian species
- Scientific career
- Fields: Herpetology

Ariovaldo Antônio Giaretta (born 17 April 1966) is a Brazilian herpetologist. He is the author or co-author of the description of several species of amphibians.

He graduated in Biology from the University of Campinas (UNICAMP), where he also obtained his master's and doctoral degrees. He is a professor at the Federal University of Uberlândia and a researcher supported by the National Council for Scientific and Technological Development (CNPq).

His research focuses on taxonomy, systematics and biogeography, with Anura (frogs and toads) serving as major model organisms. His work incorporates morphological, acoustic, molecular, behavioural and ecological data, and includes biodiversity inventories and the curation of zoological collections and their associated databases.

Giaretta has supervised master's and doctoral students in comparative biology and animal biology and has also participated in postgraduate teaching in ecology. His research has included studies of the evolution of acoustic signals in Neotropical frogs and the evolution and taxonomy of the genus Leptodactylus.

Giaretta led among others the research team that described Galgadraco zephyrius, a late Cretaceous azhdarchid pterosaur from Minas Gerais, Brazil in 2025.

== Taxa described ==
Among the taxa described by Giaretta in collaboration with other zoologists, are:

- Bokermannohyla vulcaniae Vasconcelos & Giaretta, 2005
- Brachycephalus hermogenesi (Giaretta & Sawaya, 1998)
- Hypsiboas paranaiba Carvalho, Giaretta & Facure, 2010
- Ischnocnema penaxavantinho Giaretta, Toffoli & Oliveira, 2007
- Leptodactylus sertanejo Giaretta & Costa, 2007
- Megaelosia bocainensis Giaretta, Bokermann & Haddad, 1993
- Megaelosia boticariana Giaretta & Aguiar, 1998
- Paratelmatobius poecilogaster Giaretta & Castanho, 1990
- Phyllomedusa araguari Giaretta, Oliveira & Kokubum, 2007
- Proceratophrys concavitympanum Giaretta, Bernarde & Kokubum, 2000
- Proceratophrys palustris Giaretta & Sazima, 1993
- Pseudopaludicola canga Giaretta & Kokubum, 2003
- Osteocephalus germani Ron et al., 2012
- Scinax constrictus Lima, Bastos & Giaretta, 2005
- Category:Taxa named by Ariovaldo Antonio Giaretta
