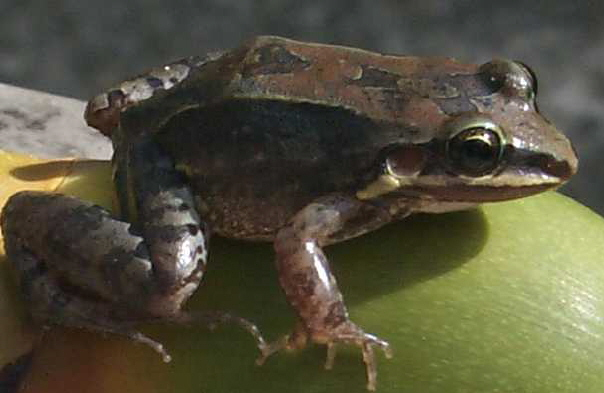
- Leptodactylus albilabris

Scientific classification
- Kingdom: Animalia
- Phylum: Chordata
- Class: Amphibia
- Order: Anura
- Superfamily: Hyloidea
- Family: Leptodactylidae; Werner, 1896

Subfamilies
- Leiuperinae; Leptodactylinae; Paratelmatobiinae
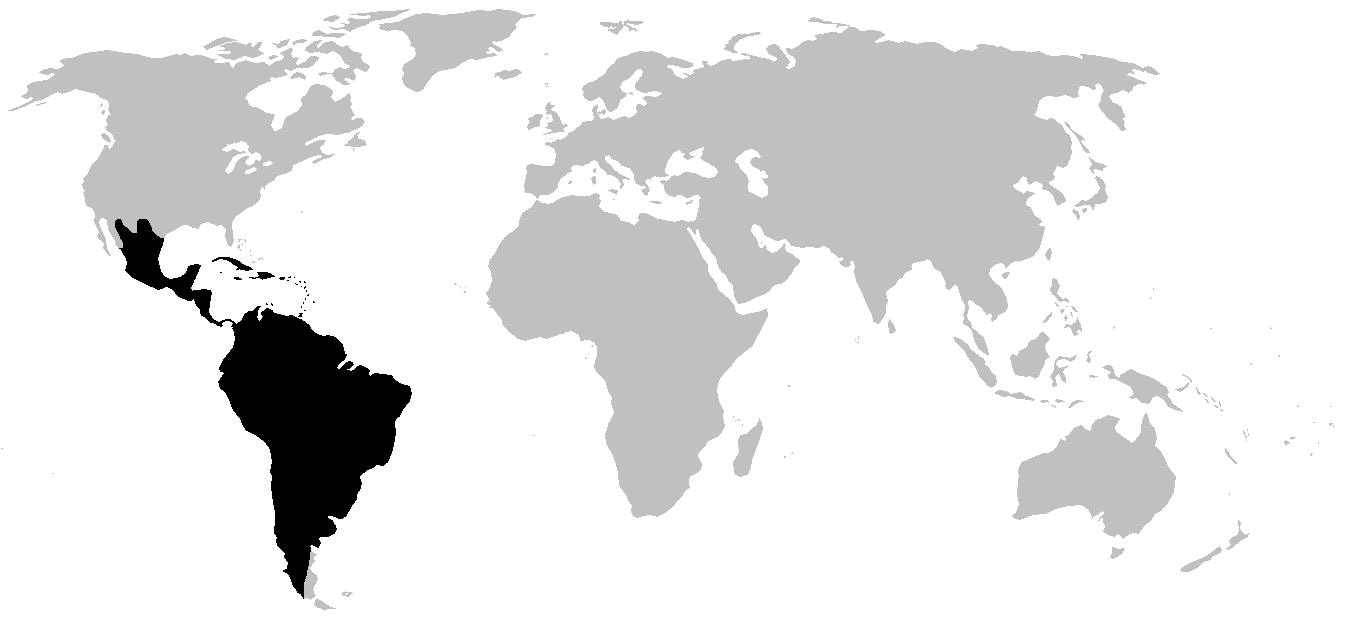
- Distribution of Leptodactylidae (in black)

= Leptodactylidae =

Family of amphibians

The southern frogs form the Leptodactylidae, a name that comes from Greek meaning a bird or other animal having slender toes. They are a diverse family of frogs that most likely diverged from other hyloids during the Cretaceous. The family has undergone major taxonomic revisions in recent years, including the reclassification of the former subfamily Eleutherodactylinae into its own family the Eleutherodactylidae; the Leptodactylidae now number 206 species in 13 genera distributed throughout Mexico, the Caribbean, and Central and South America. The family includes terrestrial, burrowing, aquatic, and arboreal members, inhabiting a wide range of habitats.

Several of the genera within the Leptodactylidae lay their eggs in foam nests. These can be in crevices, on the surface of water, or on forest floors. These foam nests are some of the most varied among frogs. When eggs hatch in nests on the forest floor, the tadpoles remain within the nest, without eating, until metamorphosis.

Fossils of Leptodactylidae have been found in Maastrichtian India.

== Classification ==
As of December 2019, the Amphibian Species of the World classifies the following genera in the family Leptodactylidae:

- Subfamily Leiuperinae Bonaparte, 1850 (90 species)
  - Edalorhina Jiménez de la Espada, 1870
  - Engystomops Jiménez de la Espada, 1872
  - Physalaemus Fitzinger, 1826
  - Pleurodema Tschudi, 1838
  - Pseudopaludicola Miranda-Ribeiro, 1926
- Subfamily Leptodactylinae Werner, 1896 (1838) (96 species)
  - Adenomera Steindachner, 1867
  - Hydrolaetare Gallardo, 1963
  - Leptodactylus Fitzinger, 1826
  - Lithodytes Fitzinger, 1843
- Subfamily Paratelmatobiinae Ohler and Dubois, 2012 (13 species)
  - Crossodactylodes Cochran, 1938
  - Paratelmatobius Lutz and Carvalho, 1958
  - Rupirana Heyer, 1999
  - Scythrophrys Lynch, 1971
- Incertae sedis
  - "Leptodactylus" ochraceus Lutz, 1930
