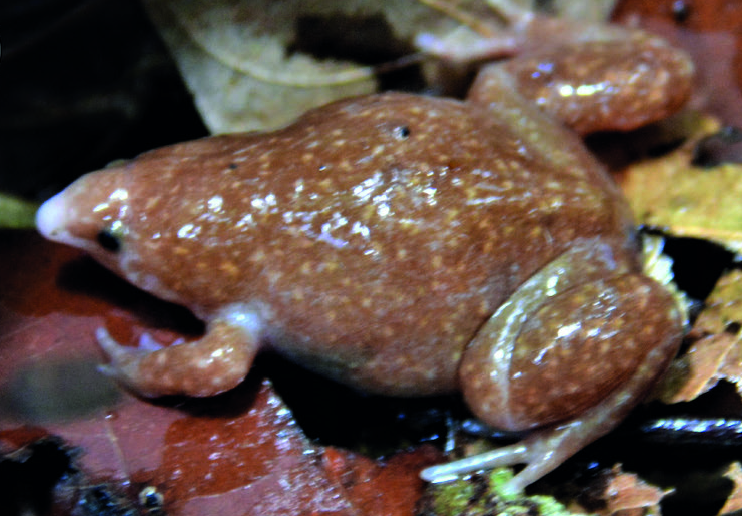
- Amapá, Brazil

Scientific classification
- Kingdom: Animalia
- Phylum: Chordata
- Class: Amphibia
- Order: Anura
- Family: Microhylidae
- Genus: Synapturanus
- Species: S. zombie

Binomial name
- Synapturanus zombie Fouquet, Leblanc, Fabre, Rodrigues, Menin, Courtois, Dewynter, Hölting, Ernst, Peloso, and Kok, 2021

= Synapturanus zombie =

Species of microhylid frog

Synapturanus zombie is a South American species of frog in the family Microhylidae.

== Taxonomy ==
Synapturanus zombie was discovered by Raffael Ernst, a German herpetologist. He named the frog "zombie" because he thought other researchers looked like zombies after digging the frogs out of the ground. It was described in 2021 by Antoine Fouquet.

S. zombie is part of an eastern clade of Synapturanus, which also includes S. salseri, S. mirandaribeiroi, S. ajuricaba, and S. mesomorphus, as well as some undescribed but suspected species. This eastern clade typically has a more robust humerus and a broader snout than species in the western clade.

== Description ==
Synapturanus zombie has an average snout-vent length of 39 mm in males (range 37–41 mm (1.5–1.6 in)). Females are slightly larger, with a 40 mm average SVL (range 39–42 mm (1.5–1.7 in)). This makes it the largest known species of Synapturanus frogs. It has a pointed nose and a narrow mouth.

The frog is medium brown on the top, and light brown on the bottom. Many orange spots are found on the skin of the frog. The glandular supracarpal pad, present in males only, is a translucent white. Yellow ovaries are able to be seen through the translucent skin of female specimens. Males emit advertisement calls from underground tunnels during and after heavy rainfall. These tunnels, also called galleries, are spaced a few meters apart from each other. The mode of reproduction of the species are unknown, but likely similar to those of other Synapturanus frogs.

== Habitat ==
Synapturanus zombie live in well-drained soil in forests in French Guiana. They are nocturnal, as well as fossorial.

== Conservation ==
S. zombie has not been assessed by the IUCN. It is only known to live in six groups of populations in French Guiana, and one additional group in Amapá, northern Brazil. Some of these groups are in protected areas. The study in which the species was first described recommended the species be given the rating of "data deficient", because of "the uncertainties regarding its distribution and population status".
