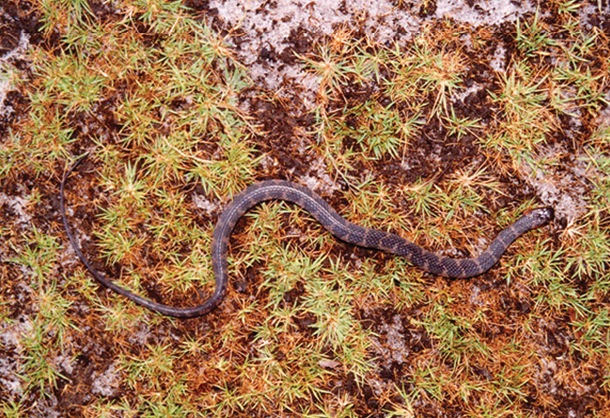

Conservation status
- Least Concern (IUCN 3.1)

Scientific classification
- Kingdom: Animalia
- Phylum: Chordata
- Class: Reptilia
- Order: Squamata
- Suborder: Serpentes
- Family: Colubridae
- Genus: Helicops
- Species: H. angulatus

Binomial name
- Helicops angulatus (Linnaeus, 1758)

Synonyms
- Coluber angulatus Linnaeus, 1758; Coluber surinamensis Shaw, 1802; Natrix aspera Wagler, 1824; Uranops angulatus — Gray, 1849; Helicops angulatus — Boulenger, 1893

= Brown-banded water snake =

Species of snake

The brown-banded water snake (Helicops angulatus) is a species of aquatic snake found in tropical South America and Trinidad and Tobago. It is also known as the water mapepire.

== Description ==
The brown-banded water snake grows to a maximum total length (including tail) of 78 cm (31 inches), although a female measuring 113 cm in has been reported in Bahia state, Brazil. Dorsally, it is olive or gray-brown, with dark brown, black-edged crossbands, which narrow at the sides, and are usually confluent with the black crossbands of the belly. There is a large dark rhomboid on the nape. Ventrally, it is yellowish (in alcohol) with black crossbands or black spots.

The dorsal scales are strongly keeled, even on the occiput and nape, and are arranged in 19 rows. Ventrals are 102–130 in number, the anal scale is divided, and the 61-94 subcaudals are paired and keeled.

== Habitat and diet ==
H. angulatus lives in fresh and brackish water, where it feeds on fish (such as freshwater eels) and possibly also frogs (such as rusty tree frogs, map tree frogs, Manaus slender-legged tree frogs, Scinax ruber, Adenomera hylaedactyla, Rhinella margaritifera, and cane toads) and their eggs, tadpoles, lizards (such as Alopoglossus spp., and common stream lizards), earthworms (Glossoscolecidae), and carrion.

== Reproduction ==
H. angulatus has been reported to be "facultatively viviparous".

== Venom ==
H. angulatus is a non-front-fanged colubroid (NFFC), venomous snake, its venom causes rapid death in mice with an injection of 0.4 mg/kg (intraperitoneally). There is an urgent need for training of the medical team in the snake identification, clinical management of snakebite, and the existence of a human-snake conflict involving NFFC species in Bolivia.
