= Red neusticurus =

There are two species of lizard named red neusticurus:

- Neusticurus rudis, native to Guyana and Venezuela
- Neusticurus surinamensis, native to Brazil
