= Antoine Fouquet =

French herpetologist (born 1979)

- Born: April 11, 1979 (age 47)
- Education: Université de Poitiers (B.Sc., 2002; M.Sc., 2003); Université Aix-Marseille; University of Tours (DEA); Université de Provence Aix-Marseille I / University of Canterbury (Ph.D., 2008)
- Known for: Research on Neotropical amphibians; taxonomy and phylogeography of frogs
- Scientific career
- Fields: Herpetology; Biology
- Workplaces: Université de Guyane; Université Paul Sabatier; Université de Poitiers; University of Canterbury; Université Aix-Marseille; Universidade de São Paulo
- Thesis: Diversity and phylogeography of eastern Guiana Shield frogs (2008)
- Doctoral advisor: Neil Gemmell
- Website: Official website

Antoine Fouquet (born April 11, 1979) is a French biologist and herpetologist, specializing in the study of Neotropical herpetofauna. Earlier in his career, he also worked on the New Zealand primitive frogs.

== Biography ==
Fouquet grew up in western France and developed a fascination with frogs and newts in the ponds around his parents’ home. He obtained the baccalauréat général in 1997. In 2000, he received the technical diploma Brevet de Technicien Supérieur Agricole (BTSA) in conservation and management. In 2002, he earned his bachelor's degree from the Université de Poitiers, after which he traveled to Costa Rica.

During his master’s studies in 2003, he spent three months in French Guiana, where he conducted research on the reproductive biology of Ameerega hahneli in cooperation with the ecology laboratory of the National Museum of Natural History in Brunoy at the Réserve naturelle nationale des Nouragues. That same year, he submitted his master’s thesis Reproductive behaviour, territoriality and vocalisation activity of Epipedobates hahneli (Anura, Dendrobatidae) in French Guiana at the Université de Poitiers and then joined the Institut méditerranéen de biodiversité et d’ecologie marine et continentale (IMBE) of the Université Aix-Marseille, where he worked until 2004 on frog diversity, phylogeography, and systematics using molecular data under the direction of André Gilles. He focused on the species complexes Scinax ruber and Rhinella margaritifera. At the same time, he studied biology, evolution, and population control at the University of Tours under Jérôme Casas, earning the Diplôme d’études approfondies (DEA).

From 2005, he pursued doctoral studies at the Université de Provence Aix-Marseille I and the University of Canterbury in New Zealand, and in 2008 he received his Ph.D. in biology under Neil Gemmell with the dissertation Diversity and phylogeography of eastern Guiana Shield frogs. His fieldwork included expeditions to French Guiana, Suriname, and the Brazilian state of Amapá, where he met the herpetologist Miguel Trefaut Rodrigues. During his postdoctoral phase, he conducted a five-month project on the phylogeography and conservation of the Hochstetter's frog (Leiopelma hochstetteri), which had originally been the intended focus of his doctoral work.

From 2008 to 2009, he was a teaching and research assistant (ATER) at the Université Aix-Marseille, where he worked on Palearctic fishes. From 2009 to 2011, he held a two-year postdoctoral fellowship at the Universidade de São Paulo in Brazil, funded by the Fundação de Amparo à Pesquisa do Estado de São Paulo (FAPESP), where he collaborated with Rodrigues on a major project on the genus Adenomera.

From 2012 to 2018, he was a research fellow (CR, Chargé de recherche) at the Laboratoire écologie, évolution, interactions des systèmes amazoniens (LEEISA), a joint research unit of the Centre national de la recherche scientifique (CNRS) and the Institut français de recherche pour l’exploitation de la mer (Ifremer) at the Université de Guyane in Cayenne, French Guiana. There, he conducted population genetic studies on Adenomera andreae in the Approuague River region. Since 2018, Fouquet has been a researcher at the Laboratoire Évolution et Diversité Biologique at the Université Paul Sabatier in Toulouse. His work focuses on the systematics, phylogeography, biogeography, and evolution of Neotropical frogs, while also addressing broader aspects of amphibian biology. One of his projects investigates diversification patterns across different groups of Amazonian frogs.

== Species described ==
=== Amphibians ===
- Adelophryne glandulata
- Adenomera amicorum
- Adenomera aurantiaca
- Adenomera gridipappi
- Adenomera inopinata
- Adenomera kayapo
- Adenomera tapajonica
- Allobates ripicolus
- Allobates vicinus
- Amazophrynella
- Amazophrynella moisesii
- Amazophrynella siona
- Amazophrynella teko
- Amazophrynella xinguensis
- Anomaloglossus apiau
- Anomaloglossus blanci
- Anomaloglossus dewynteri
- Anomaloglossus mitaraka
- Anomaloglossus saramaka
- Anomaloglossus tepequem
- Anomaloglossus vacheri
- Boana courtoisae
- Boana diabolica
- Boana eucharis
- Boana platanera
- Brasilotyphlus dubium
- Caligophryne
- Caligophryne doylei
- Caligophrynidae
- Chiasmocleis jacki
- Cycloramphus organensis
- Dendropsophus arndti
- Dendropsophus counani
- Dendropsophus vraemi
- Hylophorbus lengguru
- Hylophorbus maculatus
- Hylophorbus monophonus
- Leptodactylus fremitus
- Neblinaphryne
- Neblinaphryne mayeri
- Neblinaphrynidae
- Pristimantis campinarana
- Pristimantis crepitaculus
- Pristimantis espedeus
- Pristimantis guianensis
- Rhinella lescurei
- Rhinella martyi
- Synapturanus ajuricaba
- Synapturanus mesomorphus
- Synapturanus zombie

=== Reptiles ===
- Atractus aboiporu
- Atractus dapsilis
- Atractus trefauti
- Iphisa brunopereira
- Iphisa dorothy
- Iphisa munduruku
- Iphisa pellegrino
- Iphisa surui
- Neusticurus arekuna
- Siagonodon exiguum
