= Synapturanus ajuricaba =

Scientific classification
- Kingdom: Animalia
- Phylum: Chordata
- Class: Amphibia
- Order: Anura
- Family: Microhylidae
- Genus: Synapturanus
- Species: S. ajuricaba

Binomial name
- Synapturanus ajuricaba Fouquet, Leblanc, Fabre, Rodrigues, Menin, Courtois, Dewynter, Hölting, Ernst, Peloso, and Kok, 2021

Species of microhylid frog

Synapturanus ajuricaba is a species of microhylid frog. It is endemic to the state of Para in Brazil.

== Taxonomy ==
Synapturanus ajuricaba was described in 2021 by a team of researchers, including Raffael Ernst, a German herpetologist.

== Description ==
Synapturanus ajuricaba has a snout-vent length of 29.3–37.3 mm. This makes it larger than S. rabus and S. salseri.

The species is found in the northern parts of the Brazilian states of Amazonas and Pará.
