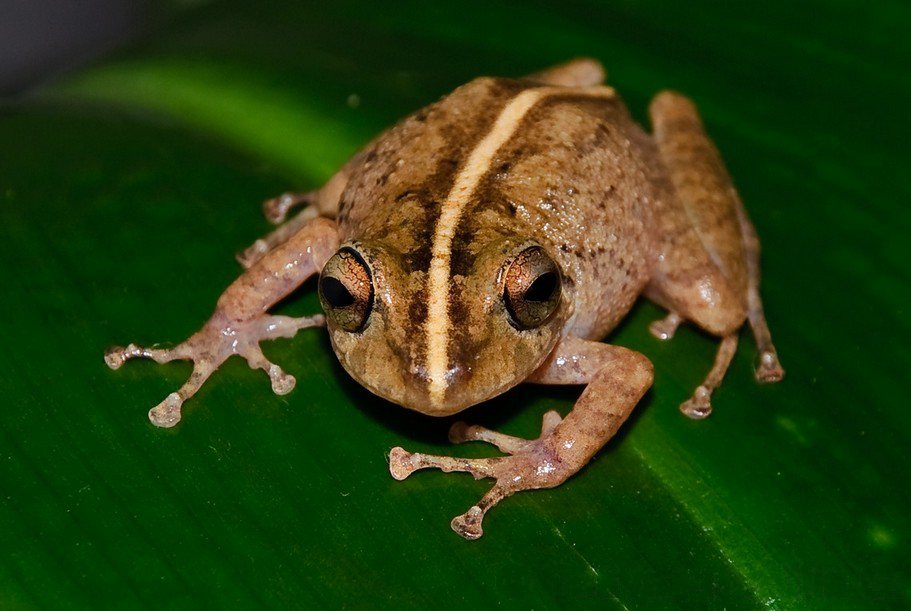

Conservation status
- Least Concern (IUCN 3.1)

Scientific classification
- Kingdom: Animalia
- Phylum: Chordata
- Class: Amphibia
- Order: Anura
- Clade: Brachycephaloidea
- Family: Craugastoridae
- Genus: Pristimantis
- Species: P. medemi

Binomial name
- Pristimantis medemi (Lynch, 1994)

Synonyms
- Eleutherodactylus medemi Lynch, 1994

= Pristimantis medemi =

Species of frog

Pristimantis medemi is a species of frog in the family Strabomantidae. The species is endemic to Colombia.

== Etymology ==
The specific name, medemi, is in honor of Federico Medem, who was a Colombian herpetologist of Baltic German descent.

== Geographic distribution ==
Pristimantis medemi is found in central Colombia, in the departments of Caquetá, Casanare, Cundinamarca, and Meta.

== Habitat ==
The natural habitats of Pristimantis medemi are tropical moist lowland forests, moist montane forests, rivers, plantations, rural gardens, and heavily degraded former forests, at elevations of 450–2,400 m (1,480–7,870 ft).

== Conservation status ==
Pristimantis medemi is threatened by habitat loss.
