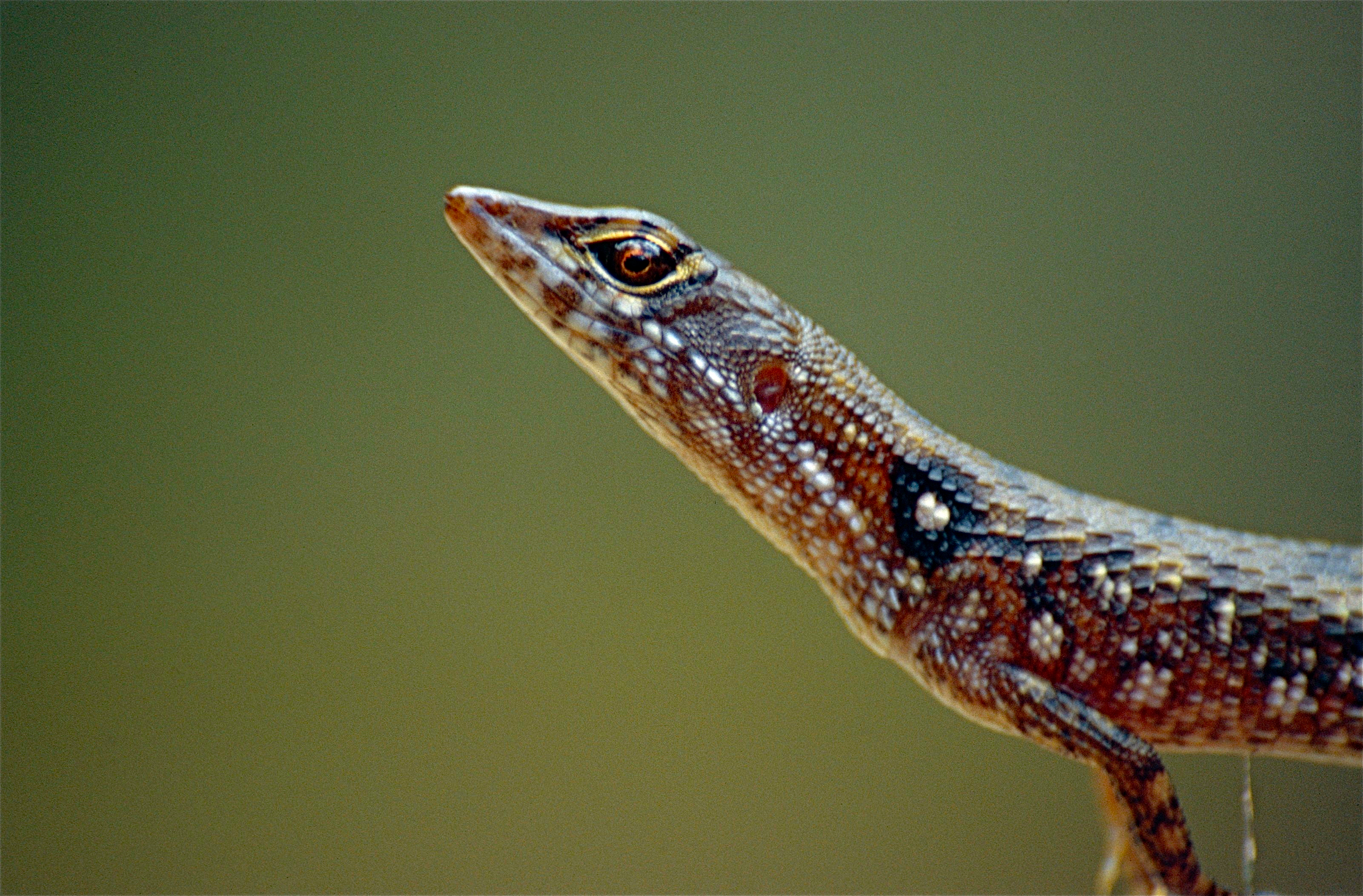
- Neusticurus bicarinatus

Scientific classification
- Kingdom: Animalia
- Phylum: Chordata
- Class: Reptilia
- Order: Squamata
- Family: Gymnophthalmidae
- Tribe: Cercosaurini
- Genus: Neusticurus; A.M.C. Duméril & Bibron, 1839

= Neusticurus =

Genus of lizards

Neusticurus is a genus of gymnophthalmid lizards endemic to northern South America. They are often found near streams and are semi-aquatic. Some species formerly included in this genus are now placed in Potamites, which also are semi-aquatic inhabitants of South America.

== Species ==
Seven species are recognized as being valid.

- Neusticurus arekuna Kok, Bittenbinder, van den Berg, Marques-Souza, Sales Nunes, Laking, Teixeira, Fouquet, Means, MacCulloch & Rodrigues, 2018
- Neusticurus bicarinatus (Linnaeus, 1758) - two-faced neusticurus
- Neusticurus medemi Dixon & Lamar, 1981 - Medem's neusticurus
- Neusticurus racenisi Roze, 1958 - Roze's neusticurus, common Venezuelan water teiid
- Neusticurus rudis Boulenger, 1900 - red neusticurus
- Neusticurus surinamensis L. Müller, 1923 - red neusticurus
- Neusticurus tatei (C.E. Burt & M.D. Burt, 1931) - Tate's neusticurus

Nota bene: A binomial authority in parentheses indicates that the species was originally described in a genus other than Neusticurus.
