= Taita College =

Secondary school in Lower Hutt, New Zealand

Location
- 188 Eastern Hutt Road, Lower Hutt 5019, New Zealand; 41.176079°S 174.966401°E

Information
- Funding type: State
- Motto: motto: Titiro whakarunga ki ngā puke. (Māori: Look upwards to the hills.)
- Established: 1957
- Ministry of Education Institution no.: 258
- Principal: Linda Pye
- Years offered: 9–13
- Gender: Coeducational
- Enrolment: 348 (July 2026)
- Website: taita.school.nz

Taita College is a state co-educational secondary school located in Taita, Lower Hutt, New Zealand. It was founded in 1957 and serves years 9 to 13 (ages 13 to 18). The school has a roll of 348 (July 2026) students.

== History ==
Taita College opened in 1957 to serve the growing population in the Taita area of Lower Hutt. The school was initially known as Taita College and Community Centre, reflecting its role as a shared facility for both secondary education and community activities. In the 1970s, the community centre functions were separated and the school became known simply as Taita College.

== Enrolment ==
Taita College has a socio-economically diverse student body, drawing from several suburbs in the northern part of Lower Hutt. As of July 2023, the ethnic composition has roughly equal numbers of Pākehā (New Zealand European) (164), Māori (159), and Pasifika (159), and small numbers of other ethnicities. Students can identify as more than one ethnicity.

== Facilities ==
The school is located on an 8-hectare site and has a range of facilities including classrooms, science labs, technology workshops, a library, gymnasium, sports fields, and a performing arts centre which is also used by community groups.

== Curriculum ==
Taita College offers the National Certificate of Educational Achievement (NCEA) at Levels 1, 2 and 3. In addition to traditional academic subjects, the school has a strong vocational education program with courses in automotive engineering, building and construction, and hospitality.

== Notable alumni ==
=== Science ===
- Neil Gemmell – geneticist

=== Sport ===
- George Bower – All Black
- Brad Shields – rugby union player
- Nigel Ah Wong – rugby union player
- Mike Kainga – rugby union player
