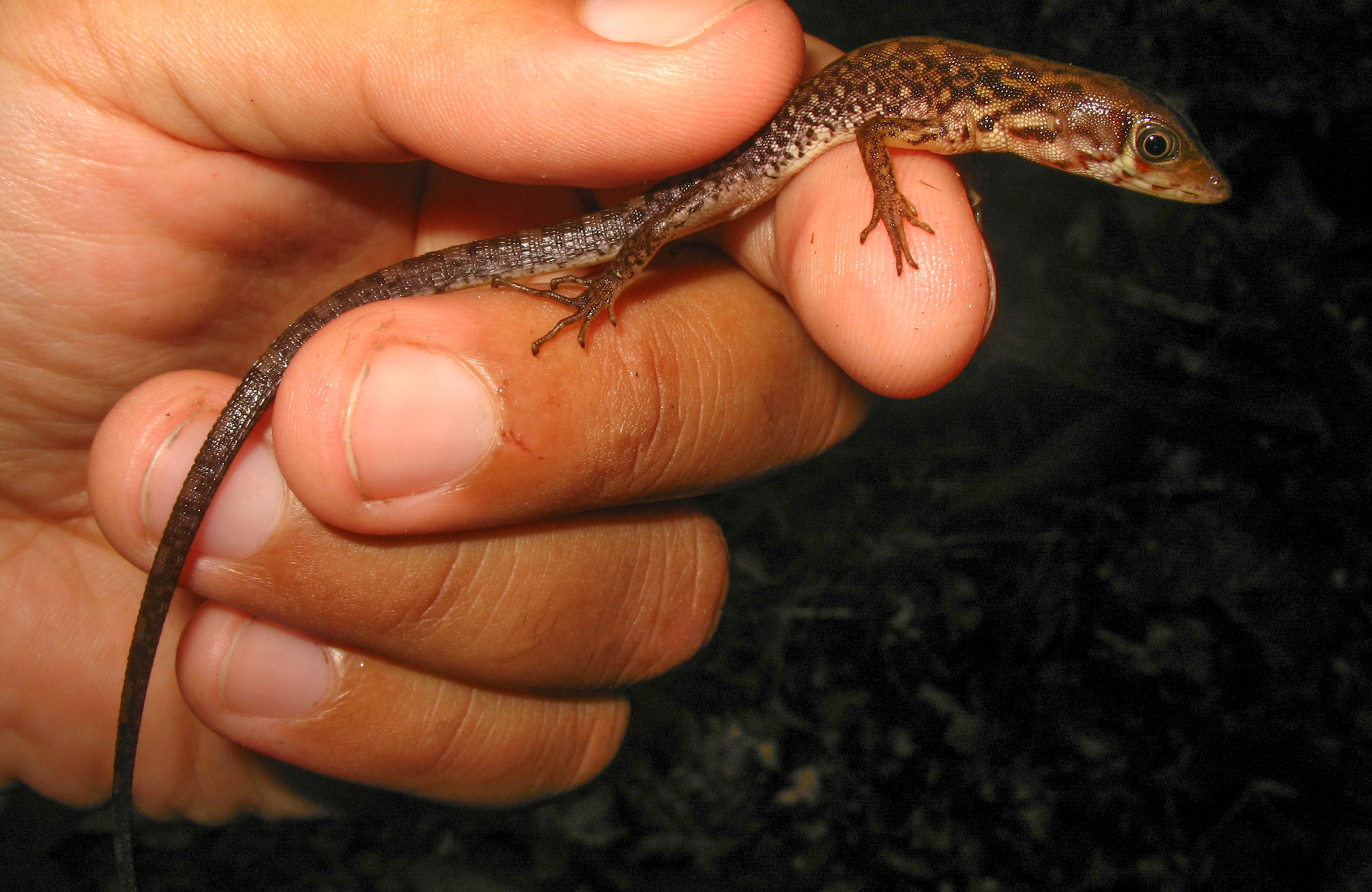

Conservation status
- Least Concern (IUCN 3.1)

Scientific classification
- Kingdom: Animalia
- Phylum: Chordata
- Class: Reptilia
- Order: Squamata
- Family: Gymnophthalmidae
- Genus: Neusticurus
- Species: N. racenisi

Binomial name
- Neusticurus racenisi Roze, 1958

= Neusticurus racenisi =

Species of lizard

Neusticurus racenisi, known commonly as Roze's neusticurus or the common Venezuelan water teiid, is a species of lizard in the family Gymnophthalmidae. The species is endemic to northern South America.

== Etymology ==
The specific name, racenisi, is in honor of Latvian-born Venezuelan entomologist Janis Racenis (1915–1980).

== Geographic range ==
N. racenisi is found in northern Brazil and adjacent Venezuela.

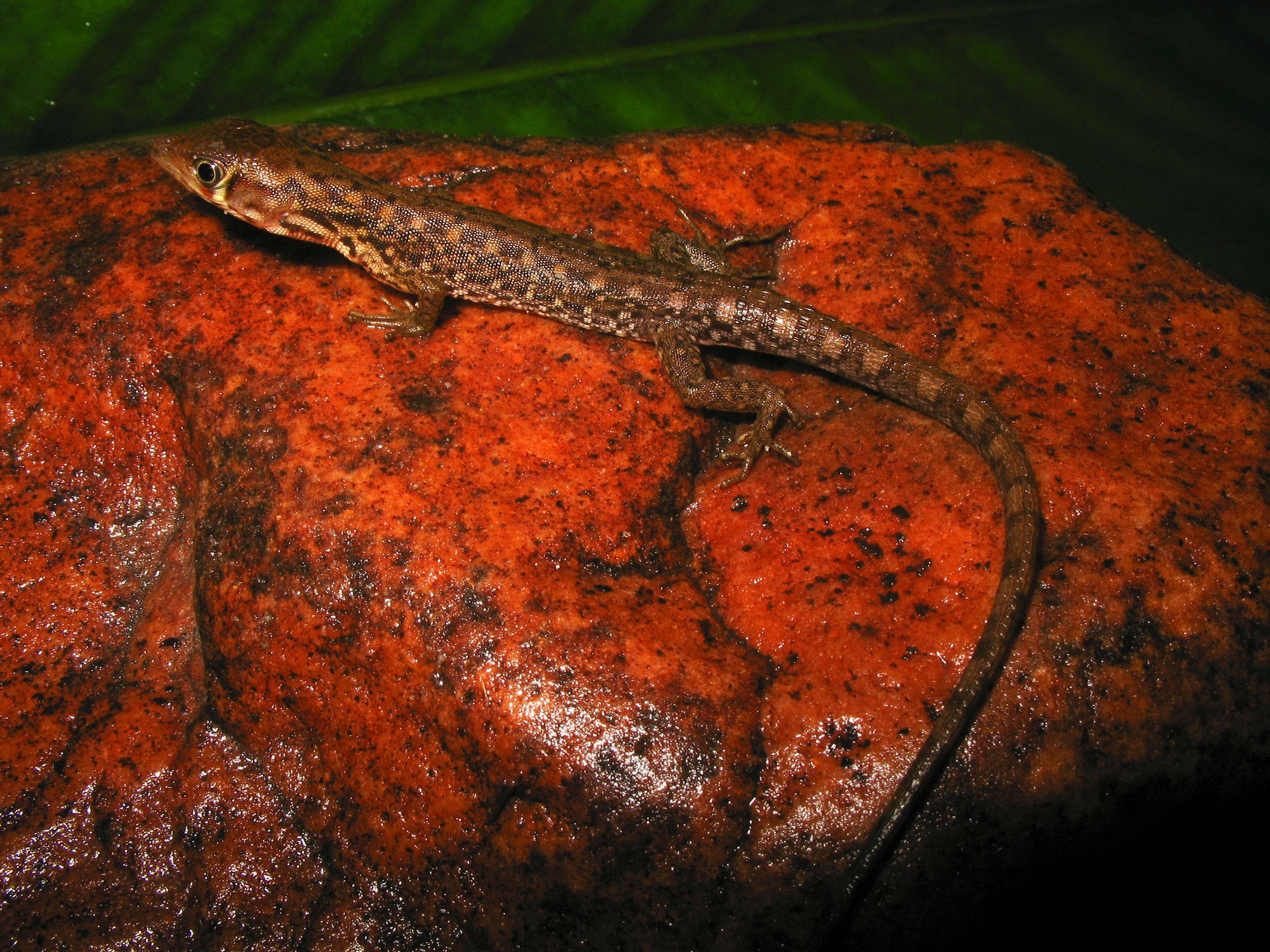
In Brazil

== Habitat ==
The preferred habitats of N. racenisi are forest and wetlands at altitudes of 100–1,215 m (328–3,986 ft).

== Reproduction ==
N. racenisi is oviparous.
