= Allobates ripicolus =

Scientific classification
- Kingdom: Animalia
- Phylum: Chordata
- Class: Amphibia
- Order: Anura
- Family: Aromobatidae
- Genus: Allobates
- Species: A. ripicolus

Binomial name
- Allobates ripicolus Fouquet, Ferrão, and Jairam, 2023

Species of frog

Allobates ripicolus is a frog in the family Aromobatidae. It is native to French Guiana, Suriname, and Brazil.
