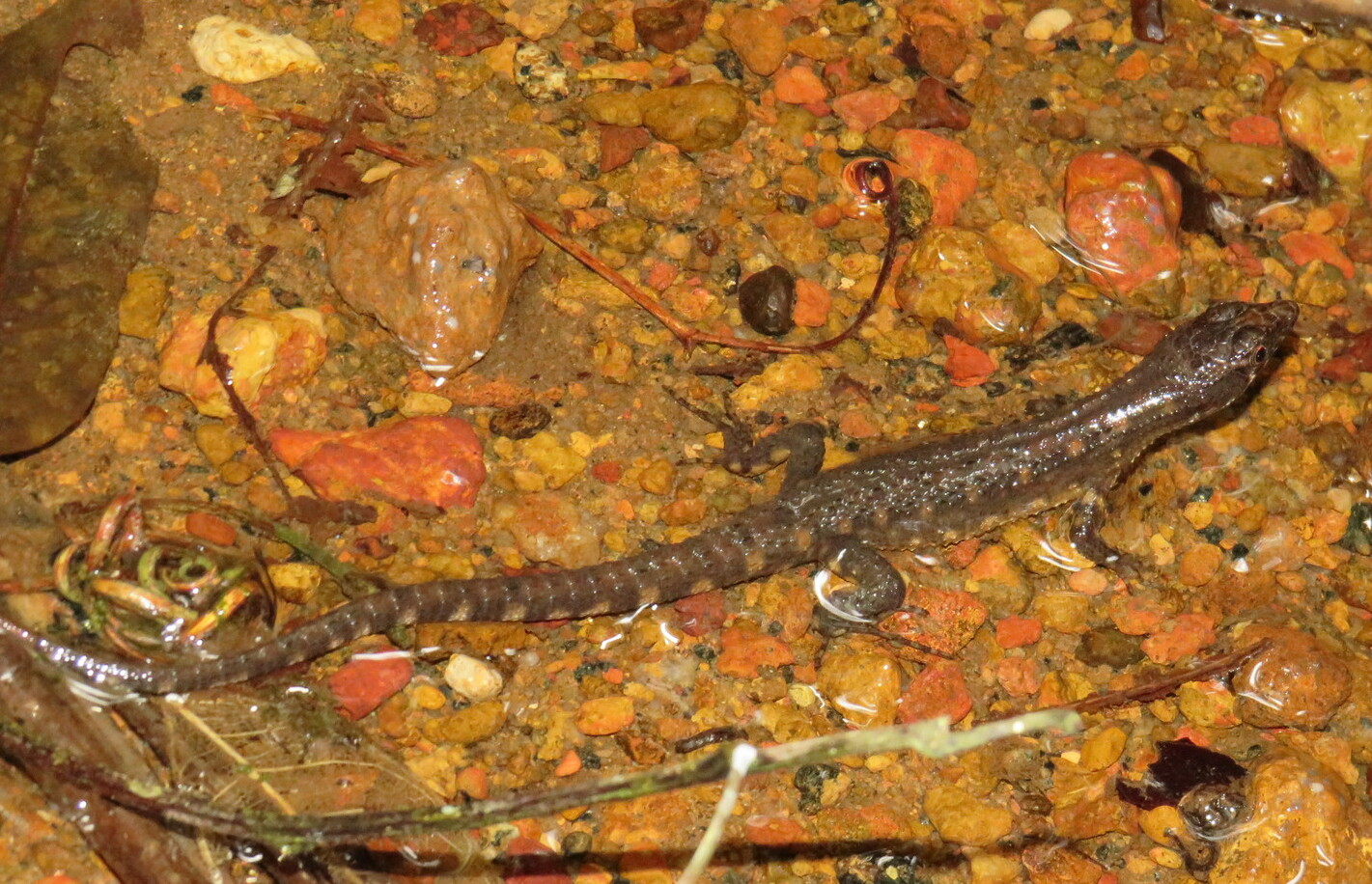
- In French Guiana

Scientific classification
- Domain: Eukaryota
- Kingdom: Animalia
- Phylum: Chordata
- Class: Reptilia
- Order: Squamata
- Family: Gymnophthalmidae
- Genus: Neusticurus
- Species: N. surinamensis

Binomial name
- Neusticurus surinamensis Müller, 1923

= Neusticurus surinamensis =

Species of lizard

Neusticurus surinamensis, the red neusticurus, is a species of lizard in the family Gymnophthalmidae. It is native to northern South America.

== Taxonomy ==
Neusticurus surinamensis is a species from the genus Neusticurus and was first described by this scientific name by Lorenz Müller, who described a specimen found near Albina, a border town in Suriname. The species is also known by its synonym Neusticurus rudis

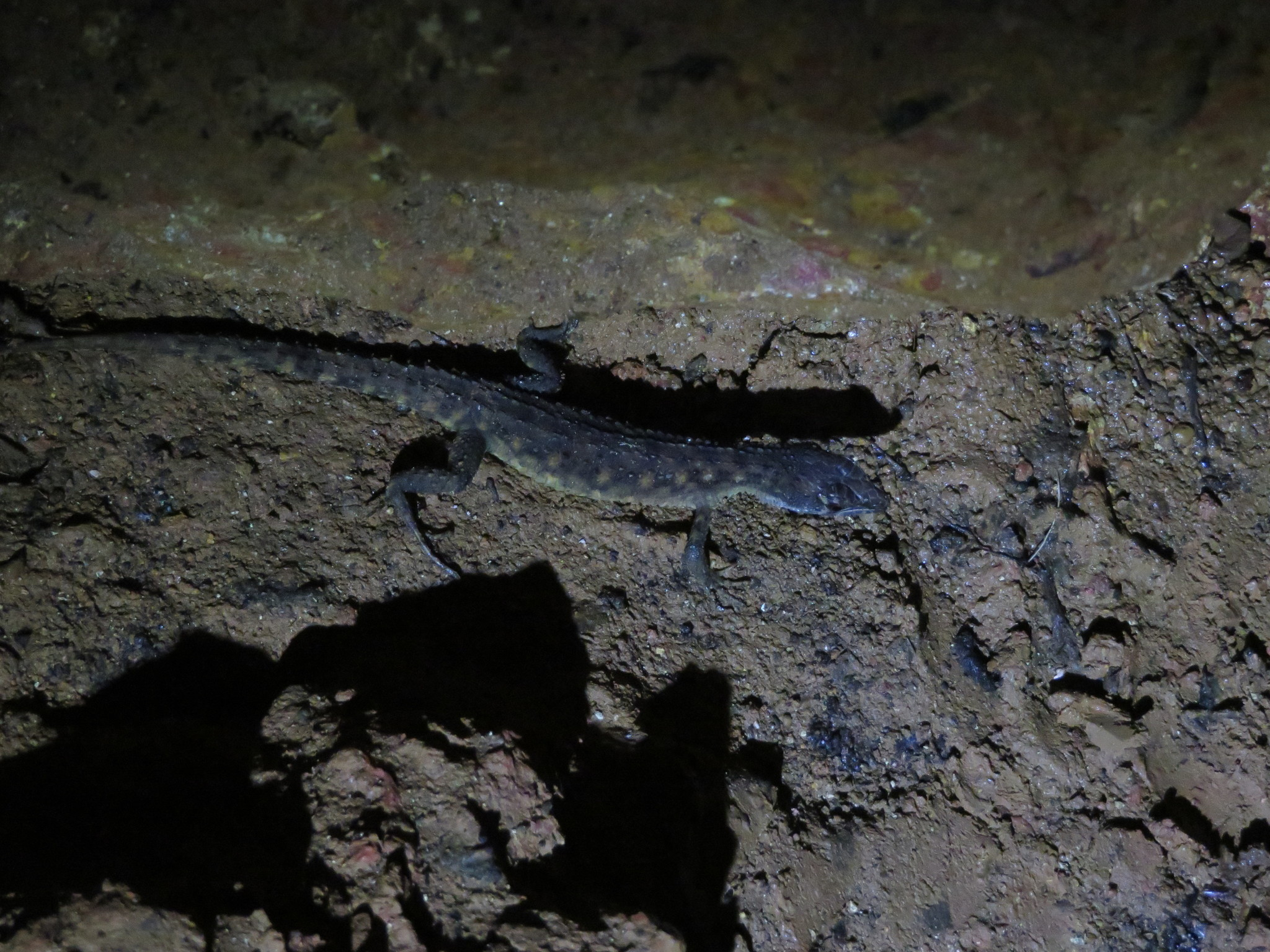
In French Guiana

== Range ==
Neusticurus surinamensis has been observed in Suriname, Brazil, and French Guiana. Others generalize the range to all of northern South America
