= Potamites trachodus =

Scientific classification
- Kingdom: Animalia
- Phylum: Chordata
- Class: Reptilia
- Order: Squamata
- Family: Gymnophthalmidae
- Genus: Potamites
- Species: P. trachodus

Binomial name
- Potamites trachodus (Uzzell, 1966)

Synonyms
- Neusticurus strangulatus trachodus Uzzell, 1966

Species of lizard

Potamites trachodus is a species of lizard in the family Gymnophthalmidae. It is found in Peru, inhabiting the Andean foothills and montane forests.
