= Friedrich Johann Graf von Medem =

German zoologist

- Born: August 29, 1912; Remten, Russian Empire
- Died: May 1, 1984 (aged 71); Bogotá, Colombia
- Scientific career
- Fields: Zoology

Friedrich Johann Graf von Medem (29 August 1912 in Remten, Russian Empire presently Latvia – 1 May 1984 in Bogotá, Colombia) was a Baltic German zoologist who emigrated to Colombia at age 38 (in 1950) and later became a representative of the IUCN Crocodiles Specialist Group for South America. He was also known as Federico Medem and published under this name.

== Eponyms ==
Numerous species have been named after Medem, including the following four reptiles and three amphibians, listed in chronological order by the year in which each was described.

- Micrurus medemi Roze, 1967, a coral snake
- Centrolene medemi (Cochran & Goin, 1970), a frog
- Bolitoglossa medemi Brame & Wake, 1972, a salamander
- Amphisbaena medemi Gans & Mathers, 1977, an amphisbaenian
- Neusticurus medemi Dixon & Lamar, 1981, a spectacled lizard
- Anolis medemi Ayala & E. Williams, 1988, an anole lizard.
- Pristimantis medemi (Lynch, 1994), a frog

Nota bene: A binomial authority in parentheses indicates that the species was originally described in a different genus.
