= Potamites erythrocularis =

Scientific classification
- Kingdom: Animalia
- Phylum: Chordata
- Class: Reptilia
- Order: Squamata
- Family: Gymnophthalmidae
- Genus: Potamites
- Species: P. erythrocularis

Binomial name
- Potamites erythrocularis Chávez & Catenazzi 2014

Species of lizard

Potamites erythrocularis is a species of lizards in the family Gymnophthalmidae. It is endemic to Manu National Park, in the Region of Cusco, Peru.

== Description ==
Adult males measure 83–85 mm (3.3–3.3 in) in snout–vent length. The dorsum is brownish, where lateral ocelli can be seen as two or three pairs in males. Lateral ocelli usually absent in females. Male has red bright on lower extremities and belly in ventrum, creamy or pale blue in chest region and some dark blotches on throat and head. In females, limbs, chest and tail are yellow to pale brown in ventrum with orange belly and creamy white throat and head.
