= Neusticurus arekuna =

Scientific classification
- Kingdom: Animalia
- Phylum: Chordata
- Class: Reptilia
- Order: Squamata
- Family: Gymnophthalmidae
- Genus: Neusticurus
- Species: N. arekuna

Binomial name
- Neusticurus arekuna Kok, Bittenbinder, van den Berg, Marques-Souza, Sales Nunes, Laking, Teixeira, Fouquet, Means, MacCulloch, & Rodrigues, 2018

Species of lizard

Neusticurus arekuna is a species of lizard in the family Gymnophthalmidae. It is found in Venezuela and Brazil.
