= Finca Chibigui salamander =

Conservation status
- Least Concern (IUCN 3.1)

Scientific classification
- Kingdom: Animalia
- Phylum: Chordata
- Class: Amphibia
- Order: Urodela
- Family: Plethodontidae
- Genus: Bolitoglossa
- Species: B. medemi

Binomial name
- Bolitoglossa medemi Brame & Wake, 1972

Species of amphibian

The Finca Chibigui salamander (Bolitoglossa medemi) is a species of salamander in the family Plethodontidae. The species is native to northwestern South America and adjacent southeastern Central America.

== Etymology ==
The specific name, medemi, is in honor of Federico Medem (1912–1984), who was a Colombian herpetologist of Baltic German descent.

== Geographic distribution ==
Bolitoglossa medemi is found in Colombia and Panama.

== Habitat ==
The preferred natural habitat of Bolitoglossa medemi is subtropical or tropical moist lowland forests.

== Conservation status ==
Bolitoglossa medemi is threatened by habitat loss.
