= Caligophryne =

Scientific classification
- Kingdom: Animalia
- Phylum: Chordata
- Class: Amphibia
- Order: Anura
- Superfamily: Hyloidea
- Clade: Brachycephaloidea
- Family: Caligophrynidae; Fouquet et al., 2024
- Genus: Caligophryne; Fouquet et al., 2024
- Species: C. doylei

Binomial name
- Caligophryne doylei Fouquet et al., 2024

Genus of frogs

Caligophryne is a genus of frog in the clade Brachycephaloidea. It contains a single species, Caligophryne doylei, and is the only member of the family Caligophrynidae. It is endemic to the highest parts of the Cerro de la Neblina tepui on the border of Brazil and Venezuela.

== Etymology ==
The genus name is a combination of caligo, the Latin word for mist, and phryne, Greek for toad. The species name references famed British writer Sir Arthur Conan Doyle, who wrote The Lost World, a novel that featured prehistoric creatures surviving on a South American plateau.

== Taxonomy ==
Caligophryne was described in 2024 alongside Neblinaphryne, another relict frog genus belonging to its own family that is also endemic to the Neblina massif; both are the first frog taxa described simultaneously as a new species, genus, and family since the purple frog (Nasikabatrachus sahyadrensis, Nasikabatrachidae) in 2003. Their persistence in the region supports the hypothesis of the tepuis serving as refugia for early Cenozoic taxa. In its 2024 description, Caligophryne was recovered as the sister group to the Brachycephalidae, a group now restricted to the Atlantic Forest, from which it diverged during the early Eocene. In a publication later that year describing a second Neblinaphryne species, Caligophryne was instead recovered as the sister to Strabomantidae, with Brachycephalidae as the sister to this clade.

== Threats ==
Due to its very restricted range at the highest reaches of the Neblina massif, this species is thought to be at high risk from climate change and potential introduction of pathogens like the amphibian fungal disease chytridiomycosis, and it has thus been recommended it be classified as critically endangered on the IUCN Red List.
