= Potamites juruazensis =

Scientific classification
- Kingdom: Animalia
- Phylum: Chordata
- Class: Reptilia
- Order: Squamata
- Family: Gymnophthalmidae
- Genus: Potamites
- Species: P. juruazensis

Binomial name
- Potamites juruazensis (Ávila-Pires & Vitt, 1998)

Synonyms
- Neusticurus juruazensis Ávila-Pires & Vitt, 1998

Species of lizard

Potamites juruazensis is a species of lizard in the family Gymnophthalmidae. It is found in western Brazil (Acre) and Peru.
