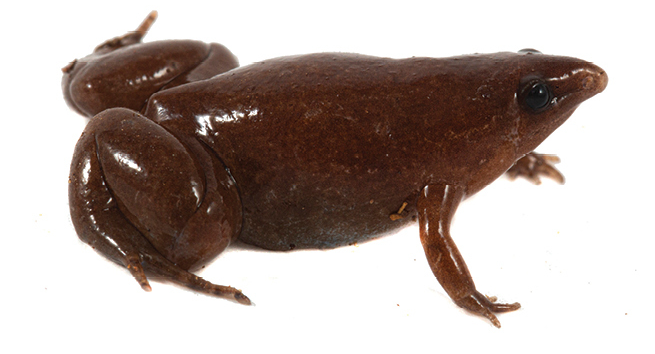

Scientific classification
- Kingdom: Animalia
- Phylum: Chordata
- Class: Amphibia
- Order: Anura
- Family: Microhylidae
- Genus: Synapturanus
- Species: S. danta

Binomial name
- Synapturanus danta Chávez, Thompson, Sánchez, Chávez-Arribasplata & Catenazzi, 2022

= Synapturanus danta =

Species of frog in the family Microhylidae

Synapturanus danta is a species of frog from the family Microhylidae that was described in 2022. It has an enlarged nose like that of a tapir, giving it the common name tapir frog.

== Taxonomy ==
Synapturanus danta was described in 2022 by Germán Chávez, a researcher at the Peruvian Institute of Herpetology. The holotype of the species is a male specimen collected in the Putumayo Province of Peru. The species name is derived from "rana danta", which is the local Spanish term for the frog, directly translating to "tapir frog".

The species is part of Microhylidae, a widespread family of over 650 species of mostly small frogs.

== Description ==
Synapturanus danta has a snout-vent length of 17.6 to 17.9 mm. The frog's nose is extended, resembling that of a tapir, giving it the name tapir frog. Furthermore its head is dorsally flat in lateral view, and its skin is colored brown, sometimes with yellow or orange spots. This skin color has drawn attention because of its similarity to chocolate, especially being compared to the chocolate frogs from the Harry Potter series of books and films.

The frog is found in the basin of the Putumayo River. It was discovered in 2019 during an expedition meant to find out more about the basin's native species. The first specimen found was a juvenile male, which was less than a third of an inch long. Two more examples were found when the researchers heard a beeping noise coming from underground. They were found living under the roots of Clusia trees.

It can be differentiated from other disc frogs due to its slender body shape, non-rounded fingers, and dorsally flat head in lateral view. Other disc frogs use their larger frame to dig deep into the ground, but S. danta's body shape is adapted for the looser soil in its native peatlands. Peatlands are seasonally saturated ecosystems, with periods of high-water levels resulting in a matrix of pools formed by rainwater and unsaturated land sitting above the pooled water. It also has a distinct call, with a dominant frequency between 1.73 and 1.81 kHz, and a note length from 0.05 to 0.06 seconds. This species call has the highest dominant frequency range compared to the other species within its Genus with the closest range of 1.31 to 1.57 kHz being that of S. salseri. Synapturanus danta is thought to be essential to their ecosystem due to its ability to live in wet soil. The species benefits the soil and also helps with water infiltration.

== In popular culture ==
A picture of the frog posted to Twitter gained attention, with commenters noting the frog was a "smooth lil fella".

== Conservation ==
The population and distribution of S. danta is largely unknown. It has not been assessed by the IUCN, but the article in which it was described suggested that it should be given the category data deficient. The Putumayo River is the only Amazon tributary without any existing or proposed dams. The area around the type locality is minimally affected by deforestation.
