= Neusticurus tatei =

Conservation status
- Least Concern (IUCN 3.1)

Scientific classification
- Kingdom: Animalia
- Phylum: Chordata
- Class: Reptilia
- Order: Squamata
- Family: Gymnophthalmidae
- Genus: Neusticurus
- Species: N. tatei

Binomial name
- Neusticurus tatei (C. Burt & M. Burt, 1931)

Synonyms
- Arthrosaura tatei C. Burt & M. Burt, 1931; Neusticurus tatei — Uzzell, 1966

Species of lizard

Neusticurus tatei, also known commonly as Tate's neusticurus, is a species of lizard in the family Gymnophthalmidae. The species is endemic to Venezuela.

== Etymology ==
The specific name, tatei, is in honor of American mammalogist George Henry Hamilton Tate.

== Geographic range ==
N. tatei is found in the state of Bolívar, Venezuela.

== Habitat ==
The preferred natural habitat of N. tatei is forest, at altitudes of 400–1,400 m (1,300–4,600 ft).

== Reproduction ==
N. tatei is oviparous.
