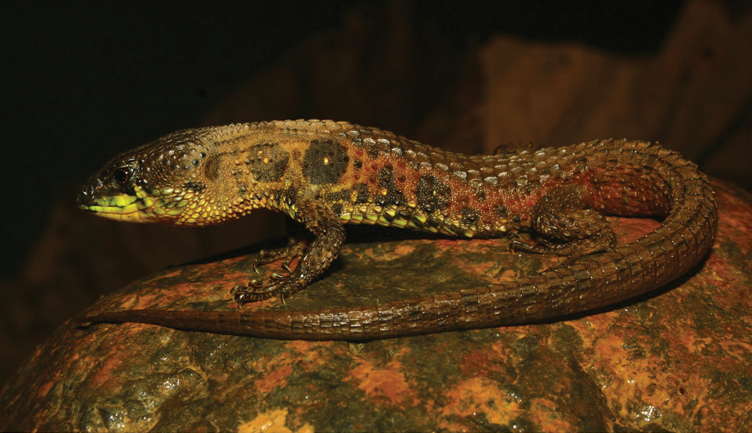

Scientific classification
- Kingdom: Animalia
- Phylum: Chordata
- Class: Reptilia
- Order: Squamata
- Family: Gymnophthalmidae
- Genus: Potamites
- Species: P. montanicola

Binomial name
- Potamites montanicola Chavez & Vasquez, 2012

= Potamites montanicola =

Species of lizard

Potamites montanicola is a species of lizard in the family Gymnophthalmidae. It is endemic to Peru.
