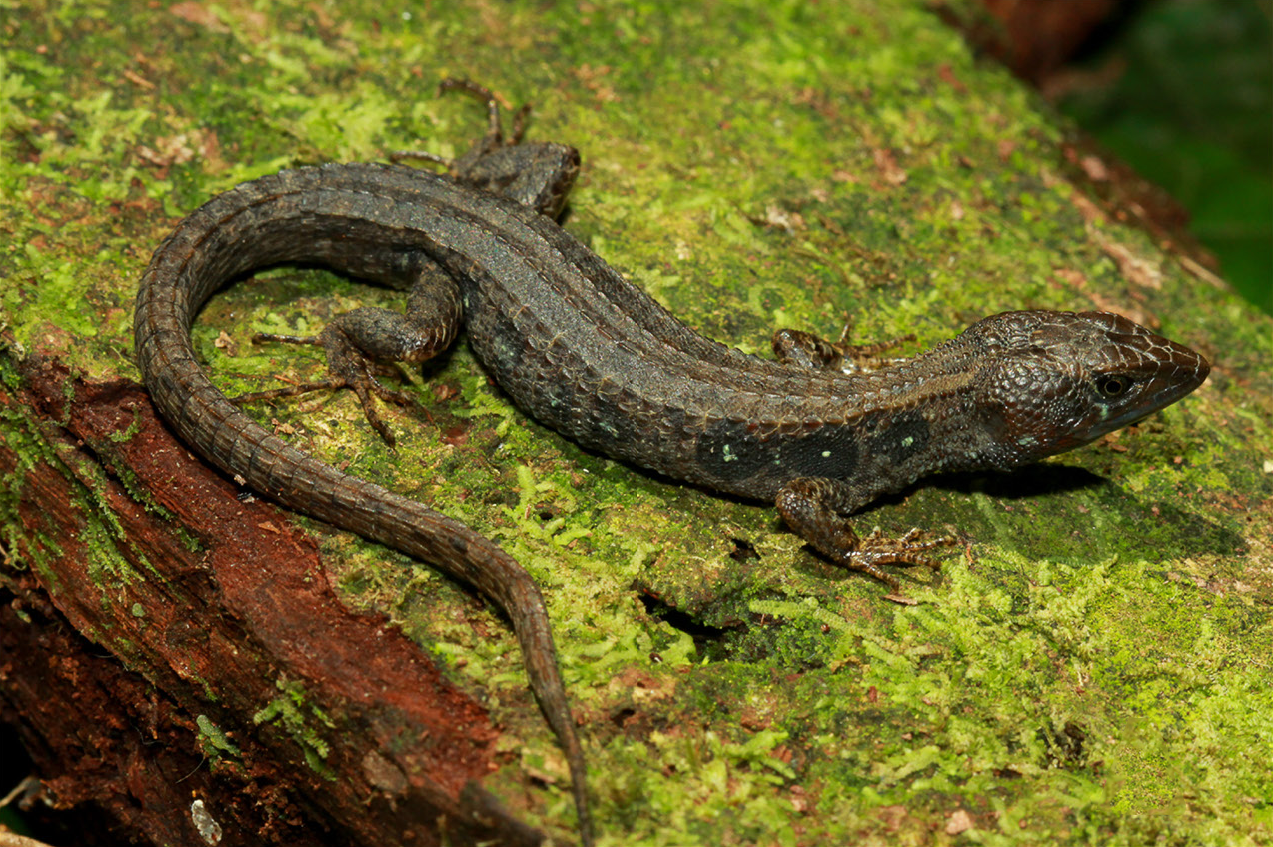

Scientific classification
- Kingdom: Animalia
- Phylum: Chordata
- Class: Reptilia
- Order: Squamata
- Family: Gymnophthalmidae
- Genus: Potamites
- Species: P. hydroimperator

Binomial name
- Potamites hydroimperator Chávez, Malqui & Catenazzi, 2021

= Potamites hydroimperator =

Species of lizard

Potamites hydroimperator is a species of lizard. It is endemic to eastern Peru, where it is known from El Sira Communal Reserve. The species is known to occur in and near streams in the El Sira Mountains. They are under threat from illegal gold mining in the region.

Potamites hydroimperator is a medium-sized member of its genus, measuring 51–60 mm (2.0–2.4 in) in snout–vent length.
