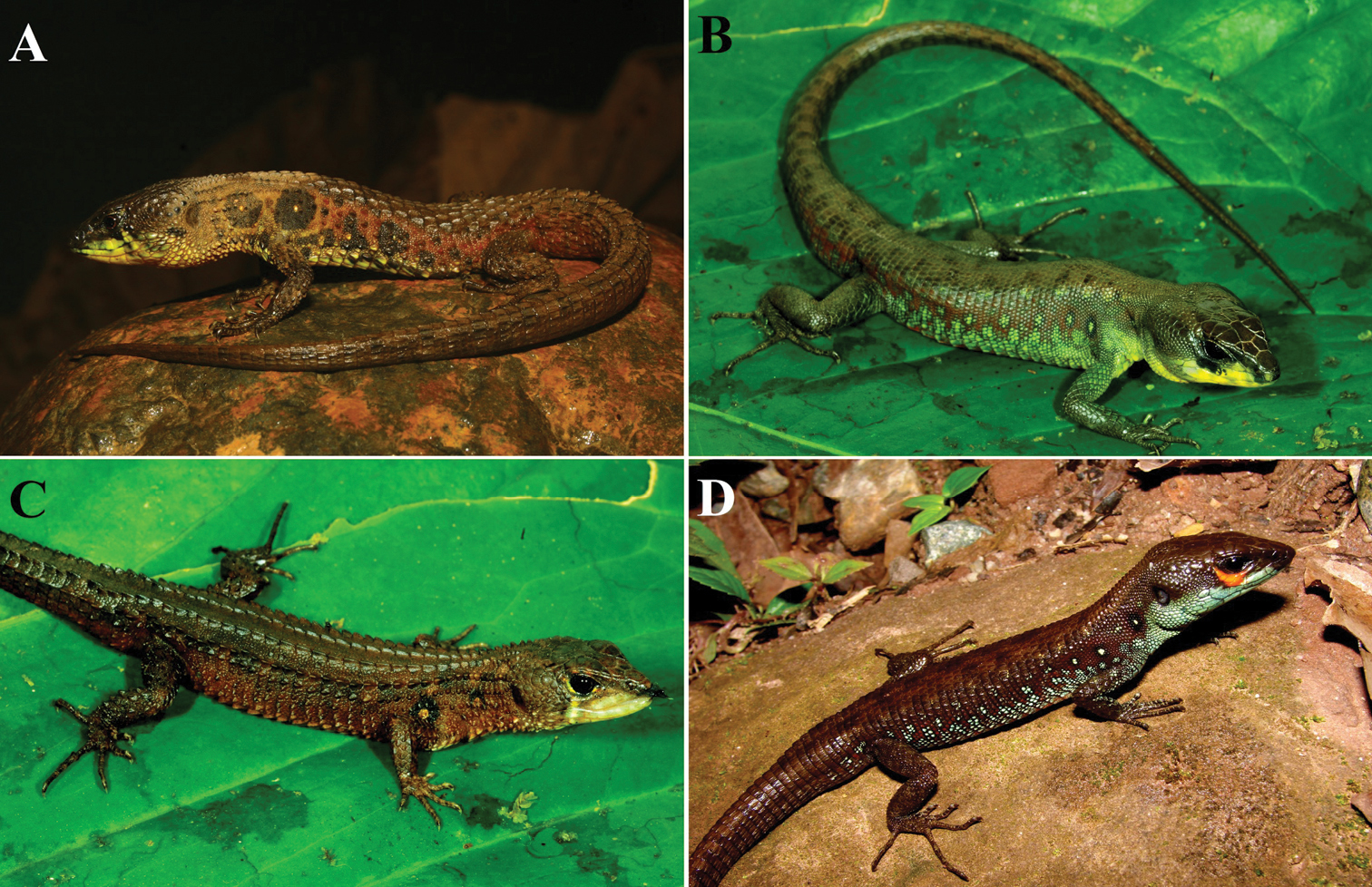
- Several Potamites species in Peru

Scientific classification
- Kingdom: Animalia
- Phylum: Chordata
- Class: Reptilia
- Order: Squamata
- Family: Gymnophthalmidae
- Genus: Potamites; Doan & Castoe, 2005

= Potamites =

Genus of lizards

Potamites is a genus of lizards in the family Gymnophthalmidae. The genus is restricted to northern South America (Bolivia, Brazil, Colombia, Ecuador and Peru) and southern Central America (Costa Rica and Panama). They are semiaquatic and found near streams.

== Taxonomy and species ==
Until 2005, species now placed in Potamites were included in Neusticurus, another genus containing semi-aquatic lizards of South America. Despite the move, some still have an English name that refers to their former genus, including P. strangulatus, the big-scaled neusticurus. Even after this split, genetic studies revealed that Potamites was paraphyletic and to resolve this two species were moved to Gelanesaurus in 2016.

The genus Potamites currently contains 8 valid species. Further changes are likely, as P. ecpleopus as currently defined is paraphyletic, and it has been suggested that trachodus, usually considered a subspecies of P. strangulatus, should be recognized as a separate species.

- Potamites ecpleopus (Cope, 1875) – common stream lizard
- Potamites erythrocularis (Chávez & Catenazzi, 2014)
- Potamites hydroimperator Chávez, Malqui & Catenazzi, 2021
- Potamites juruazensis (Ávila-Pires & Vitt, 1998)
- Potamites montanicola (Chávez & Vásquez, 2012)
- Potamites ocellatus (Sinitsin, 1930)
- Potamites strangulatus (Cope, 1868) – big-scaled neusticurus
- Potamites trachodus (Uzzell, 1966)

Nota bene: A binomial authority in parentheses indicates that the species was originally described in a genus other than Potamites.
