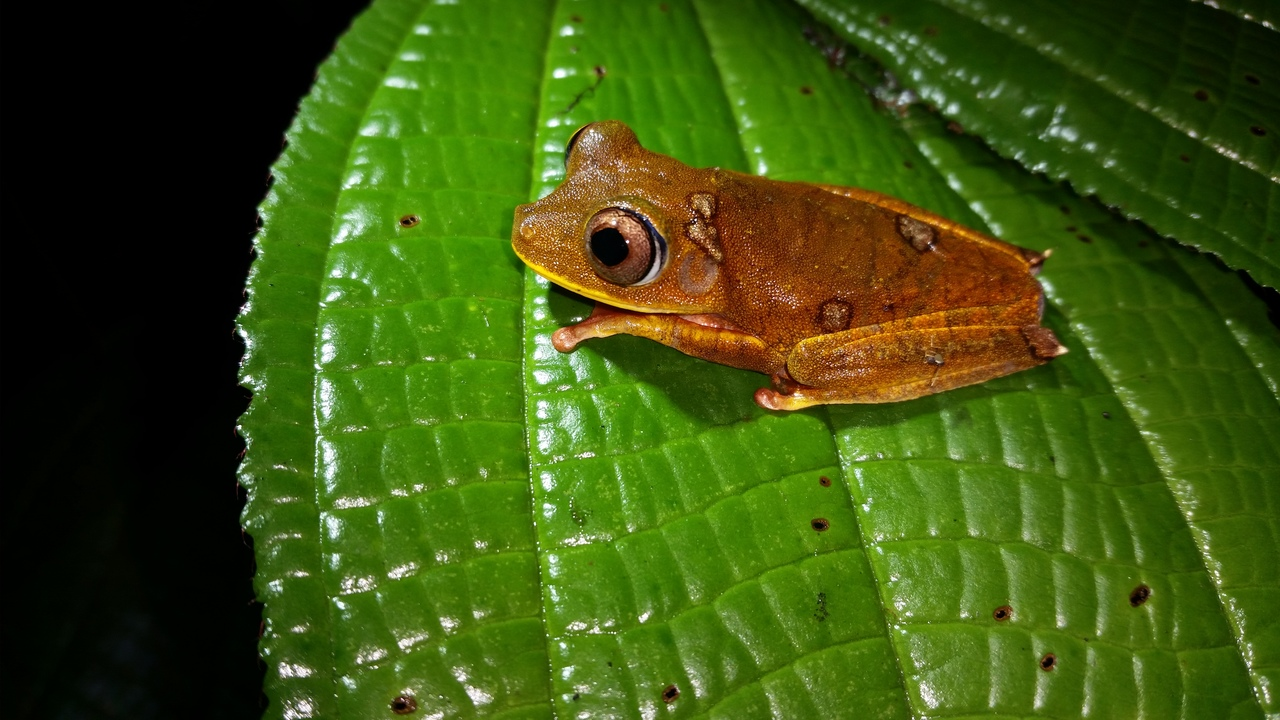

Scientific classification
- Kingdom: Animalia
- Phylum: Chordata
- Class: Amphibia
- Order: Anura
- Family: Hylidae
- Genus: Boana
- Species: B. diabolica

Binomial name
- Boana diabolica (Fouquet, Martinez, Zeidler, Courtois, Gaucher, Blanc, Lima, Souza, Rodrigues, and Kok, 2016)

Synonyms
- Hypsiboas diabolicus Fouquet, Martinez, Zeidler, Courtois, Gaucher, Blanc, Lima, Souza, Rodrigues, and Kok, 2016

= Boana diabolica =

Species of frog

Boana diabolica is a frog in the family Hylidae. It is endemic to Brazil and French Guiana.

This frog has bright red coloration on the hidden parts of its legs and front and hind feet.
