= "Centrolene" medemi =

Conservation status
- Endangered (IUCN 3.1)

Scientific classification
- Kingdom: Animalia
- Phylum: Chordata
- Class: Amphibia
- Order: Anura
- Family: Centrolenidae
- Genus: "Centrolene"
- Species: "C." medemi

Binomial name
- "Centrolene" medemi (Cochran and Goin, 1970)

Synonyms
- Centrolenella medemi Cochran and Goin, 1970; Centrolene medemi (Cochran and Goin, 1970)

Species of frog

"Centrolene" medemi is a species of frog in the family Centrolenidae. The species occurs in the Cordillera Oriental in the Tolima, Caquetá, and Putumayo Departments in Colombia and adjacent Napo in Ecuador. The generic placement of this species within the subfamily Centroleninae is uncertain (incertae sedis). The specific name medemi honors "Fred" Medem, collector of the holotype. The common name Medem [sic] giant glass frog has been coined for it by Frank & Ramus, 1995.

== Description ==
Adult males measure 26–31 mm (1.0–1.2 in) and adult females 35–44 mm (1.4–1.7 in) in snout–vent length. The snout is rounded in dorsal profile and truncated to slightly protruding when viewed laterally. The tympanum is indistinct and partly covered by the supra-tympanic fold. The fingers have absent to extensive webbing (from inner to outer fingers). The toes are extensively webbed. The dorsal surfaces of head, body, and limbs are olive green to grayish brown and bear large cream spots. The ventral parietal peritoneum is white. Adult males have a large humeral spine. The pre-pollical spine is not separated from the first finger. The iris is grayish brown and has dark reticulation.

== Habitat and conservation ==
This species lives on streamsides in montane cloud forests at elevations of 790–1,800 m (2,590–5,910 ft) above sea level. It also occurs in secondary forest, as long as there is good vegetation cover close to streams. The eggs are laid on leaves overhanging the water.

It is locally common in Colombia, but only one specimen, collected in 1975, is known from Ecuador. The specific threats are poorly known but probably include habitat loss, introduction alien predatory fishes, and pollution from the spraying of illegal crops. Chytridiomycosis might also be a threat.
