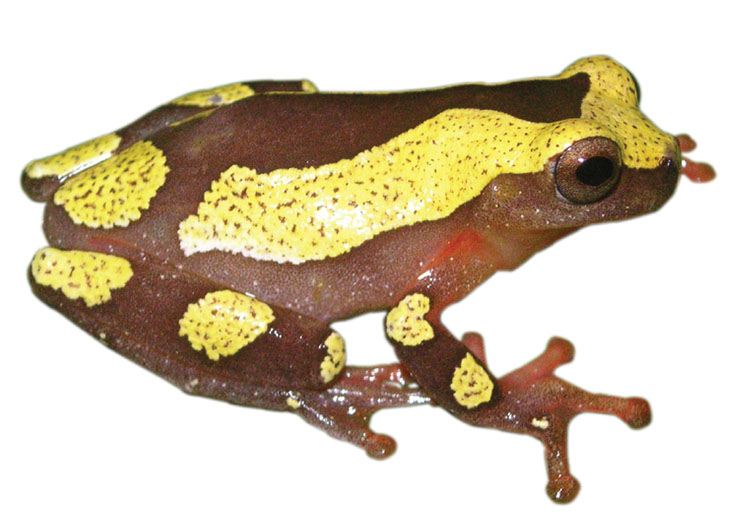
- Holotype, an adult male

Conservation status
- Least Concern (IUCN 3.1)

Scientific classification
- Kingdom: Animalia
- Phylum: Chordata
- Class: Amphibia
- Order: Anura
- Family: Hylidae
- Genus: Dendropsophus
- Species: D. arndti

Binomial name
- Dendropsophus arndti Caminer, Milá, Jansen, Fouquet, Venegas, Chávez, Lougheed, and Ron, 2017

= Dendropsophus arndti =

Species of amphibian

Dendropsophus arndti is a species of "clown tree frogs" described in 2017 that lives in the Amazon basin of Bolivia, Peru, and Brazil. The specific name arndti honors professor Rudolf G. Arndt, in recognition of his financial support for research and nature conservation. Accordingly, common name Arndts' treefrog has been coined for it.

== Distribution ==
This species is found in the Amazon basin of southeastern Peru, Bolivia (Beni and Santa Cruz Departments) and western Brazil (Rondônia, possibly east to Mato Grosso).

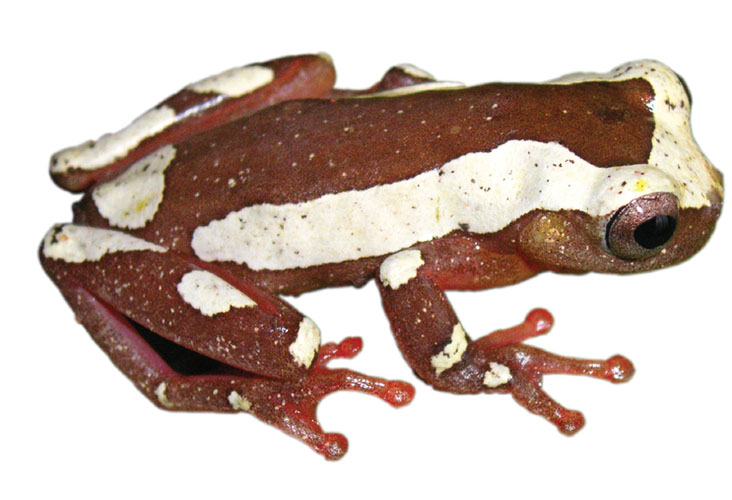
Male with dorso-lateral bands

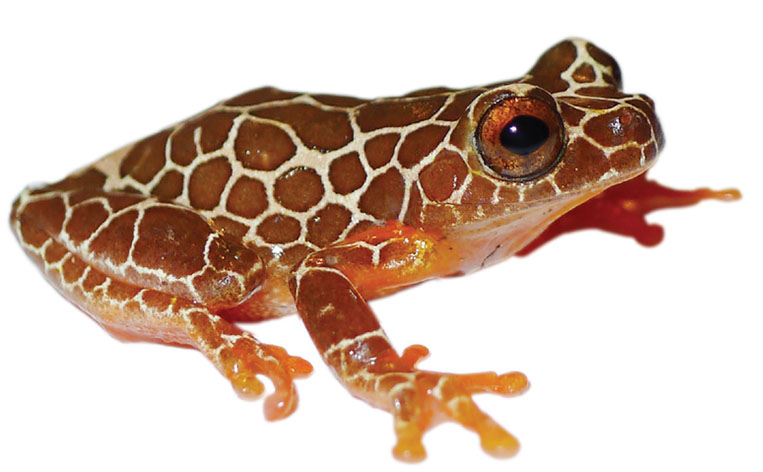
Male with reticulated dorsal pattern

== Description ==
Adult males measure 28–32 mm (1.1–1.3 in) and adult females, based on a single specimen, 33 mm (1.3 in) in snout–vent length. The head is broader than it is long. The snout is short and rounded in dorsal view, truncate in profile. The eyes are large and protuberant. The tympanum is concealed beneath skin, but the tympanic annulus is visible below skin. The supratympanic fold is faint but conceals the tympanic annulus dorsally. The fingers and toes are partially webbed and bear large discs (smaller on the toes than on the fingers). The skin is smooth with varying coloration. Most specimens have clear dorsolateral bands, but some have a reticulated dorsal pattern. The background color is dark brown to brown, and the bands, spots, and reticulations are white to bright yellow.

== Habitat and conservation ==
Dendropsophus arndti has been recorded in Beni savanna, Chiquitano dry forests, and Bolivian Yungas at elevations of 148–529 m (486–1,736 ft) above sea level. Specimens have found perched in vegetation up to 1.4 m (4 ft 7 in) above the ground or water in range of habitat types, often near water (river shores, temporary swamplands, and artificial ponds) but also along forest edges.

The IUCN Red List of Threatened Species classifies Dendropsophus arndti as of "least concern" because of its relatively wide distribution in mostly intact habitat. Human-induced fire is a localized threat that is getting more frequent.
