= Amphisbaena medemi =

Conservation status
- Data Deficient (IUCN 3.1)

Scientific classification
- Kingdom: Animalia
- Phylum: Chordata
- Class: Reptilia
- Order: Squamata
- Clade: Amphisbaenia
- Family: Amphisbaenidae
- Genus: Amphisbaena
- Species: A. medemi

Binomial name
- Amphisbaena medemi Gans & Mathers, 1977

Species of lizard

Amphisbaena medemi is a species of amphisbaenian in the family Amphisbaenidae. The species is endemic to Colombia.

== Etymology ==
The specific name, medemi, is in honor of Federico Medem, who was a Colombian herpetologist, of Baltic German descent.

== Geographic range ==
In Colombia, Amphisbaena medemi is found in the departments of Atlántico, Cesar, and La Guajira.

== Habitat ==
The preferred habitat of Amphisbaena medemi is forest at altitudes of 45–776 m (148–2,546 ft).

== Reproduction ==
Amphisbaena medemi is oviparous.
