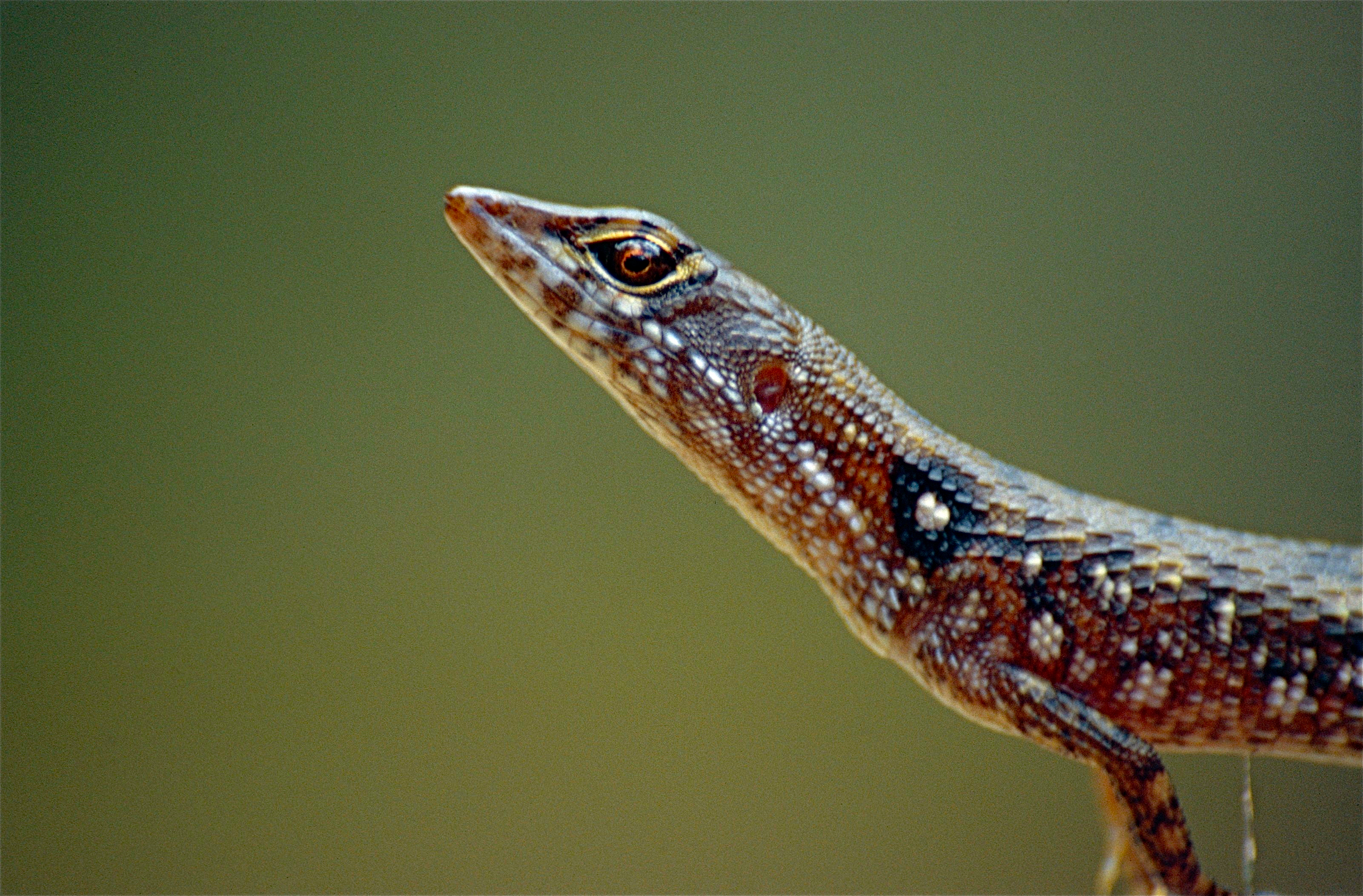

Conservation status
- Least Concern (IUCN 3.1)

Scientific classification
- Kingdom: Animalia
- Phylum: Chordata
- Class: Reptilia
- Order: Squamata
- Suborder: Lacertoidea
- Family: Gymnophthalmidae
- Genus: Neusticurus
- Species: N. bicarinatus

Binomial name
- Neusticurus bicarinatus (Linnaeus, 1758)

= Neusticurus bicarinatus =

Species of lizard

Neusticurus bicarinatus, the two-faced neusticurus, is a species of lizard in the family Gymnophthalmidae. It is found in Suriname, French Guiana, Venezuela, Guyana, and Brazil.

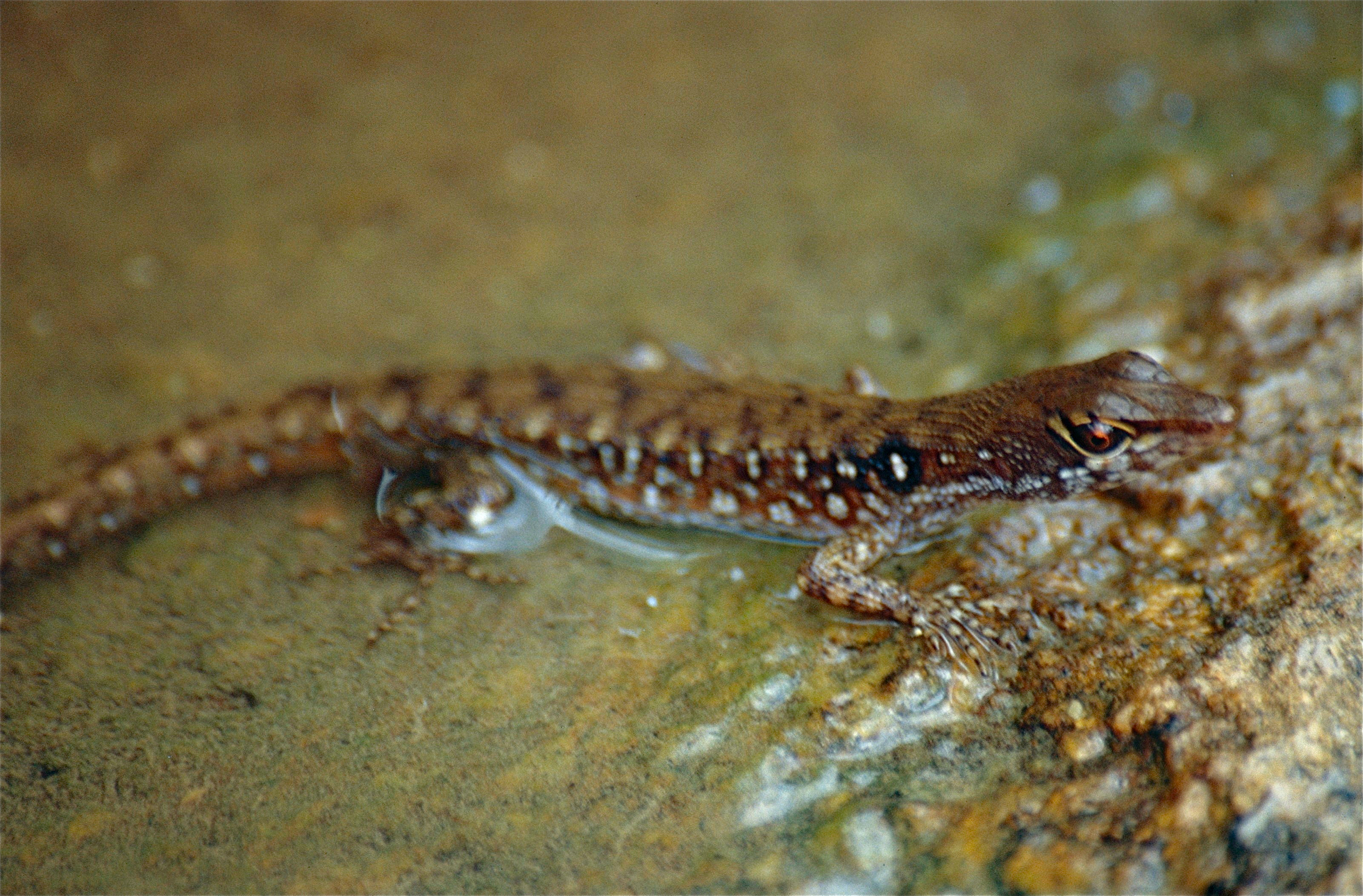
In water, French Guiana.
