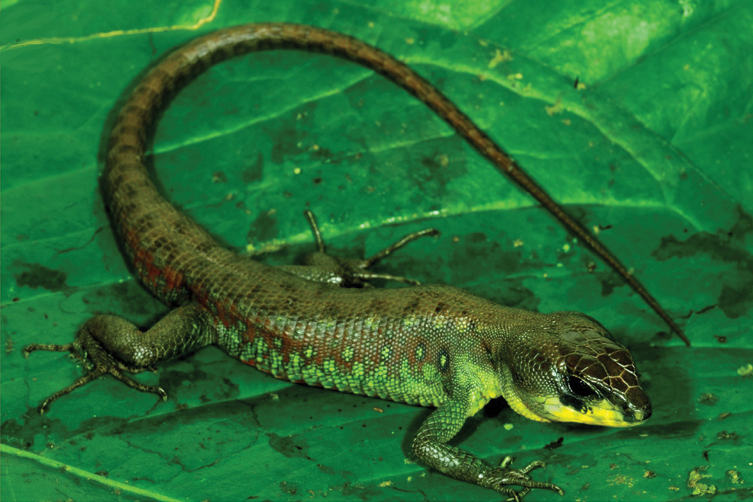

Conservation status
- Least Concern (IUCN 3.1)

Scientific classification
- Kingdom: Animalia
- Phylum: Chordata
- Class: Reptilia
- Order: Squamata
- Suborder: Lacertoidea
- Family: Gymnophthalmidae
- Genus: Potamites
- Species: P. strangulatus

Binomial name
- Potamites strangulatus (Cope, 1868)

= Potamites strangulatus =

Species of lizard

Potamites strangulatus, the big-scaled neusticurus, is a species of lizard in the family Gymnophthalmidae. It is found in Ecuador and Peru.
