= Anolis medemi =

Conservation status
- Least Concern (IUCN 3.1)

Scientific classification
- Kingdom: Animalia
- Phylum: Chordata
- Class: Reptilia
- Order: Squamata
- Suborder: Iguania
- Family: Dactyloidae
- Genus: Anolis
- Species: A. medemi

Binomial name
- Anolis medemi Ayala & E.E. Williams, 1988

Species of lizard

Anolis medemi is a species of lizard in the family Dactyloidae. The species endemic to Colombia.

== Etymology ==
The specific name, medemi, is in honor of Baltic German zoologist Friedrich Johann Graf von Medem.

== Geographic distribution ==
In Colombia, Anolis medemi is found on the island Isla Gorgona and on the associated islet Isla Gorgonilla.

== Habitat ==
The preferred natural habitat of Anolis medemi is forest.

== Reproduction ==
Anolis medemi is oviparous.
