= Neil Gemmell =

New Zealand geneticist

Neil Gemmell FRSNZ, FLS
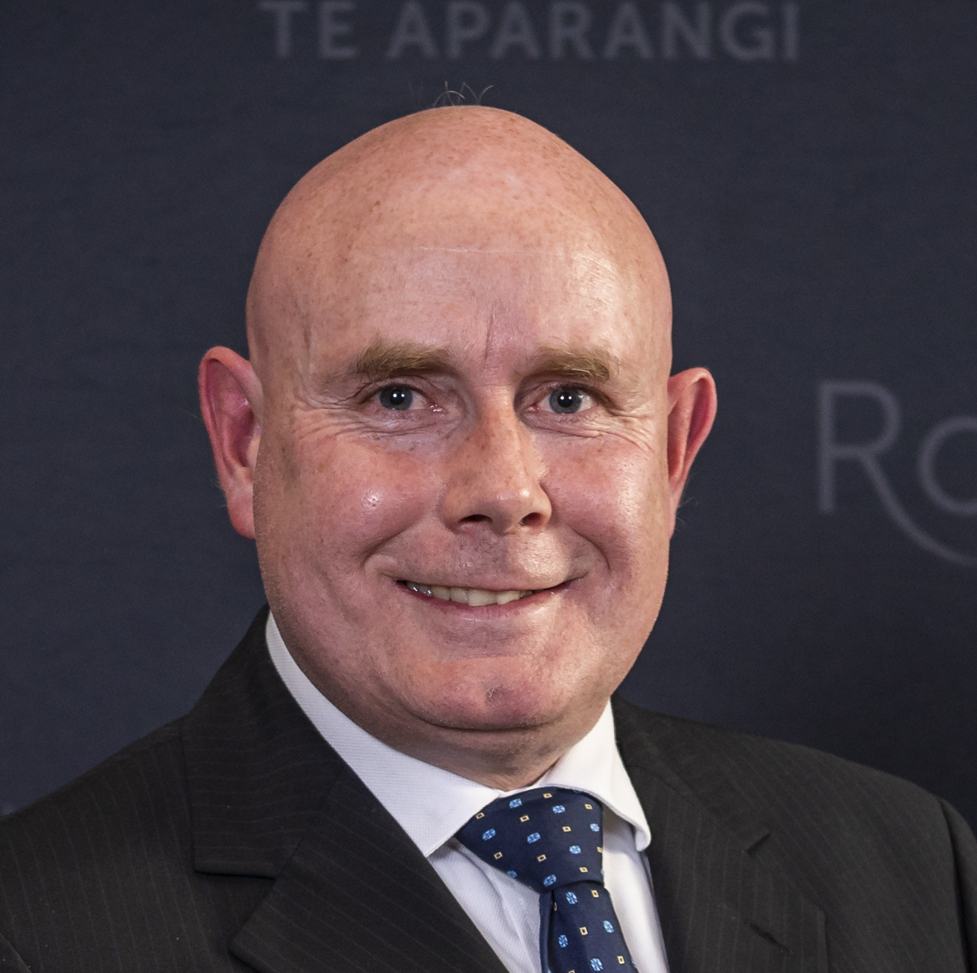
- Gemmell in 2020
- Born: Neil John Gemmell
- Education: Victoria University of Wellington; La Trobe University
- Known for: Loch Ness Monster hunt (2018); Sequencing of the tuatara genome (2020)
- Awards: Hutton Medal
- Scientific career
- Fields: Geneticist
- Workplaces: University of Otago
- Thesis: Population and evolutionary investigations in the platypus (Ornithorhynchus anatinus) : a molecular approach (1994)
- Website: University profile

Neil John Gemmell FRSNZ, FLS is a New Zealand geneticist. His research areas cover evolutionary genetics and genomics, molecular ecology, and conservation biology. Originally from Lower Hutt, he obtained his PhD at La Trobe University in Melbourne, Australia. Since 2008, Gemmell has been a professor at the University of Otago and since 2019 holds one of their seven Sesquicentennial Distinguished Chairs (Poutoko Taiea). Significant work includes the search of the Loch Ness Monster (2018) and the sequencing of the tuatara genome (published in 2020). In 2020, Gemmell received the Hutton Medal by the Royal Society Te Apārangi.

== Early life and education ==
Gemmell received his education at Taita College in Lower Hutt; he graduated from the school as dux in 1984. He was inspired by his science teacher, Saty Candasamy, to pursue this interest and initially aimed to study zoology. When he discovered that zoology was too popular with fellow graduates, he changed his focus to "something less popular" for better career opportunities. Gemmell went to Victoria University of Wellington, from which he graduated in biochemistry and genetics. In 1988, he went to La Trobe University in Melbourne, Australia, where he obtained a PhD in 1994. The title of his thesis was Population and evolutionary investigations in the platypus (Ornithorhynchus anatinus) : a molecular approach.

== Professional career ==
In 1994, Gemmell went to England for postdoctoral research at the University of Cambridge (1994–1997) and the University of Leicester (1997 – February 1998). In February 1998, he took a position with the University of Canterbury, where he remained until 2008. That year, he moved to a position at the University of Otago where he has remained since. Since 2011, Gemmell has led a team that sequenced the tuatara genome. The scientific interest in the tuatara genome is high given the longevity of the species (tuatara can live for 100 years) and its low susceptibility to diseases. The findings were published in the science journal Nature in August 2020.

In 2018, Gemmell was team leader for an expedition to sample environmental DNA (eDNA) at Loch Ness. The research goal was to prove the existence, or otherwise, of the Loch Ness Monster and given that the creature's existence has been debated since the 1930s, their work created much attention. The overall objective was to show the public how science works. The findings were revealed in September 2019 and the team did not find any eDNA that they did not expect (i.e. there was no evidence for a reptilian monster). There was significant DNA of eels and the research team concluded that the sightings are likely those of eels that have grown to a large size. Gemmell concluded by stating that "there may well be a Loch Ness monster, we don't know, we didn't find it."

During 2020, Gemmell advocated the implementation of a wastewater monitoring system to detect ribonucleic acid (RNA) as a method to identify infections with COVID-19. Based on overseas research, Gemmell estimates that new cases may be detected two to three days faster than using standard methods. He cited the case of Arizona State University, where a wastewater sample from a residential college with 300 individuals showed positive results. When the population got tested, two asymptomatic cases were detected which may have caused an outbreak without the wastewater tests in place. The New Zealand wastewater research is led by the Institute of Environmental Science and Research.

== Awards and recognition ==
In 2017, Gemmell was voted a fellow of the Linnean Society of London. In December 2017, he was announced as one of six New Zealand scholars who received a Fulbright Scholarship for 2018. Gemmell undertook research at the Massachusetts Institute of Technology on gene drive for pest control. Gemmell received awards from the Genetics Society of AustralAsia (MJD White Medal – 2018) and the New Zealand Society for Biochemistry and Molecular Biology (NZSBMB Award for Research Excellence – 2019).

In 2019, the University of Otago celebrated its 150th anniversary by creating seven Sesquicentennial Distinguished Chairs (Poutoko Taiea). These were awarded to the highest-achieving professors and Gemmell was awarded one of those positions.

In November 2020, Gemmell was awarded the Hutton Medal, the oldest award bestowed by the Royal Society Te Apārangi. The society's citation said the award was "for fundamentally changing our understanding of animal ecology and evolution and driving the development of new approaches for conservation and management of the world's rarest species". Gemmell was elected a Fellow of the Royal Society Te Apārangi in March 2021.

== Selected works ==
=== Chapters in books ===
Gemmell has written or contributed to four chapters in books:

- Neil J Gemmell; Erica V Todd; Alexander Goikoetxea; Oscar Ortega-Recalde; Timothy A Hore (30 January 2019). "Natural sex change in fish". Current Topics in Developmental Biology. 134: 71–117. doi:10.1016/BS.CTDB.2018.12.014. ISSN 0070-2153. PMID 30999982.
- Sterling M Sawaya; Andrew T Bagshaw; Emmanuel Buschiazzo; Neil J Gemmell (1 January 2012). "Promoter microsatellites as modulators of human gene expression". Advances in Experimental Medicine and Biology. 769: 41–54. ISSN 0065-2598. PMID 23560304.

=== Journal papers ===
The most highly cited or otherwise notable journal contributions are as follows:

- Raphael K Didham; Jason M Tylianakis; Neil J Gemmell; Tatyana A Rand; Robert M Ewers (27 July 2007). "Interactive effects of habitat modification and species invasion on native species decline". Trends in Ecology & Evolution. 22 (9): 489–496. doi:10.1016/J.TREE.2007.07.001. ISSN 0169-5347. PMID 17673330.
- Raphael K Didham; Jason M Tylianakis; Melissa A Hutchison; Robert M Ewers; Neil J Gemmell (21 July 2005). "Are invasive species the drivers of ecological change?". Trends in Ecology & Evolution. 20 (9): 470–474. doi:10.1016/J.TREE.2005.07.006. ISSN 0169-5347. PMID 16701420.
- Wesley C Warren; LaDeana W Hillier; Jennifer A Marshall Graves; et al. (8 May 2008). "Genome analysis of the platypus reveals unique signatures of evolution". Nature. 453 (7192): 175–83. doi:10.1038/NATURE06936. ISSN 1476-4687. PMC 2803040. PMID 18464734.
- James W Kijas; Johannes A Lenstra; Ben Hayes; et al. (February 2012). "Genome-wide analysis of the world's sheep breeds reveals high levels of historic mixture and strong recent selection". PLOS Biology. 10 (2) e1001258. doi:10.1371/JOURNAL.PBIO.1001258. ISSN 1544-9173. PMC 3274507. PMID 22346734.
- Antoine Fouquet; André Gilles; Miguel Vences; Christian Marty; Michel Blanc; Neil J Gemmell (31 October 2007). "Underestimation of species richness in neotropical frogs revealed by mtDNA analyses". PLOS One. 2 (10) e1109. Bibcode:2007PLoSO...2.1109F. doi:10.1371/JOURNAL.PONE.0001109. ISSN 1932-6203. PMC 2040503. PMID 17971872.
- Jawad Abdelkrim; Bruce Robertson; Jo-Ann Stanton; Neil Gemmell (1 March 2009). "Fast, cost-effective development of species-specific microsatellite markers by genomic sequencing". BioTechniques. 46 (3): 185–192. doi:10.2144/000113084. ISSN 0736-6205. PMID 19317661.
- Neil J Gemmell; Kim Rutherford; Stefan Prost; et al. (5 August 2020). "The tuatara genome reveals ancient features of amniote evolution". Nature. 584 (7821): 403–409. doi:10.1038/S41586-020-2561-9. ISSN 1476-4687. PMC 7116210. PMID 32760000.
- Emmanuel Buschiazzo; Neil J Gemmell (1 October 2006). "The rise, fall and renaissance of microsatellites in eukaryotic genomes". BioEssays. 28 (10): 1040–1050. doi:10.1002/BIES.20470. ISSN 0265-9247. PMID 16998838.
- Neil J Gemmell; Victoria J Metcalf; Fred W Allendorf (1 May 2004). "Mother's curse: the effect of mtDNA on individual fitness and population viability". Trends in Ecology & Evolution. 19 (5): 238–244. doi:10.1016/J.TREE.2004.02.002. ISSN 0169-5347. PMID 16701262.
- Daniel James White; Jonci Nikolai Wolff; Melanie Pierson; Neil John Gemmell (1 December 2008). "Revealing the hidden complexities of mtDNA inheritance". Molecular Ecology. 17 (23): 4925–4942. doi:10.1111/J.1365-294X.2008.03982.X. ISSN 0962-1083. PMID 19120984.
- Daniel H Nussey; Duncan Baird; Emma Barrett; et al. (2 March 2014). "Measuring telomere length and telomere dynamics in evolutionary biology and ecology". Methods in Ecology and Evolution. 5 (4): 299–310. doi:10.1111/2041-210X.12161. ISSN 2041-210X. PMC 4375921. PMID 25834722.
- Sterling Sawaya; Andrew Bagshaw; Emmanuel Buschiazzo; Pankaj Kumar; Shantanu Chowdhury; Michael A Black; Neil Gemmell (6 February 2013). "Microsatellite tandem repeats are abundant in human promoters and are associated with regulatory elements". PLOS One. 8 (2) e54710. Bibcode:2013PLoSO...854710S. doi:10.1371/JOURNAL.PONE.0054710. ISSN 1932-6203. PMC 3566118. PMID 23405090.
