= Micrurus medemi =

Conservation status
- Critically Endangered (IUCN 3.1)

Scientific classification
- Kingdom: Animalia
- Phylum: Chordata
- Class: Reptilia
- Order: Squamata
- Suborder: Serpentes
- Family: Elapidae
- Genus: Micrurus
- Species: M. medemi

Binomial name
- Micrurus medemi Roze, 1967
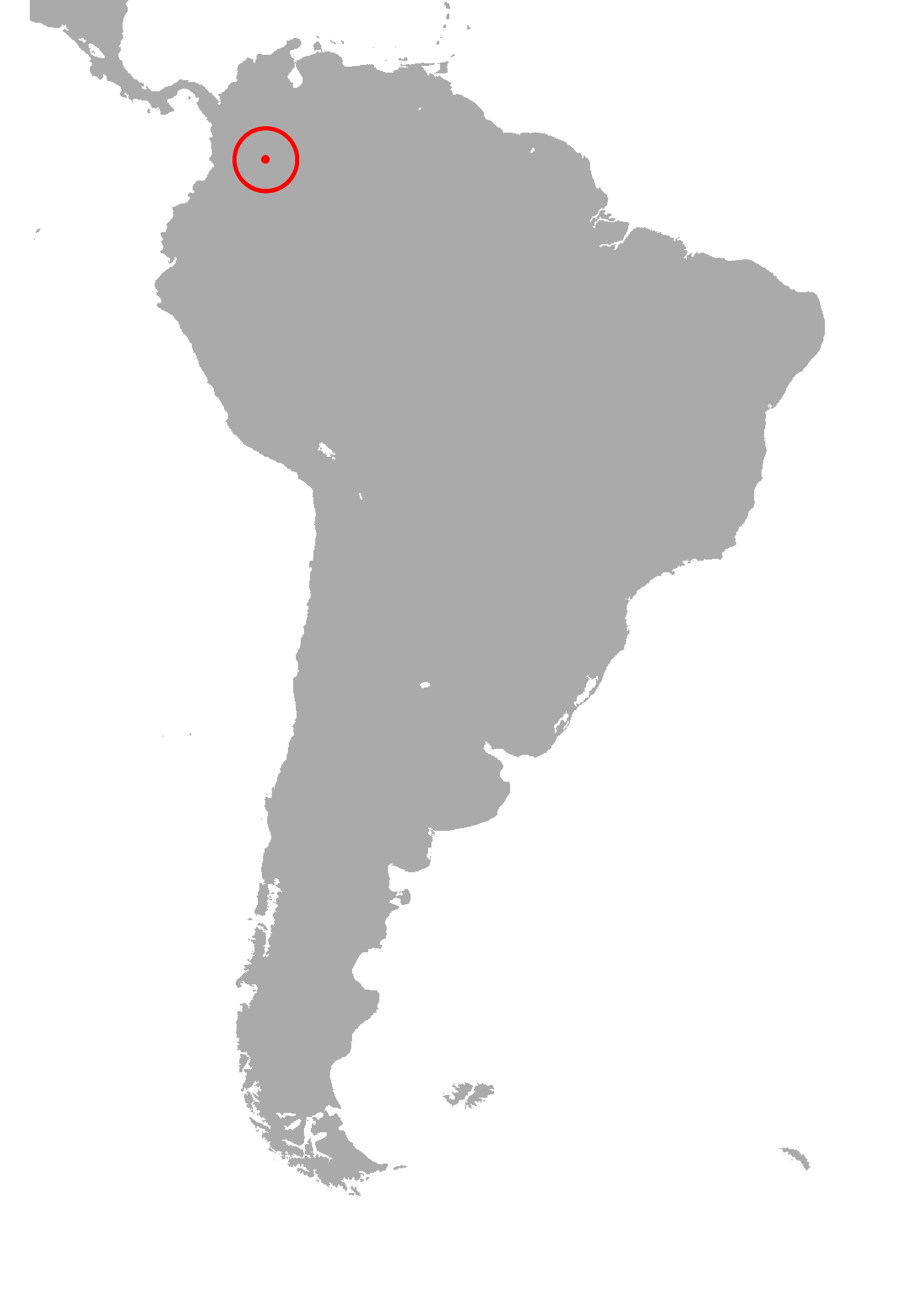

Synonyms
- Micrurus psyches medemi Roze, 1967

Species of snake

Micrurus medemi, also known commonly as Medem's coral snake and the Villavicencio coral snake, is a species of venomous snake in the family Elapidae. The species is endemic to Colombia.

== Etymology ==
Micrurus medemi was named after Baltic German zoologist Friedrich Johann Graf von Medem.

== Description ==
The color pattern of Micrurus medemi consists of red, black, and white rings. The red rings are wide and melanistic, and may be dark red, purple, or brownish black. The black rings are the widest, and are not arranged in triads. The white rings are the narrowest.

== Geographic distribution ==
Micrurus medemi is found in central Colombia, in Cundinamarca Department and Meta Department.

== Habitat ==
The preferred natural habitat of Micrurus medemi is forest, at elevations of 250–600 m (820–1,970 ft).

== Behavior ==
Micrurus medemi is terrestrial, living in the leaf litter on the forest floor.

== Diet ==
Micrurus medemi is known to prey upon smaller species of snakes such as Ninia atrata.

== Reproduction ==
Micrurus medemi is oviparous.
