= Neusticurus medemi =

Conservation status
- Least Concern (IUCN 3.1)

Scientific classification
- Kingdom: Animalia
- Phylum: Chordata
- Class: Reptilia
- Order: Squamata
- Family: Gymnophthalmidae
- Genus: Neusticurus
- Species: N. medemi

Binomial name
- Neusticurus medemi Dixon & Lamar, 1981

Species of lizard

Neusticurus medemi, also known commonly as Medem's neusticurus, is a species of lizard in the family Gymnophthalmidae. The species is native to northern South America.

== Etymology ==
The specific name, medemi, is in honor of Colombian herpetologist Federico Medem.

== Geographic range ==
Neusticurus medemi is found in Colombia (Vaupés Department) and Venezuela.

== Habitat ==
The preferred natural habitats of Neusticurus medemi are freshwater wetlands and forest, at altitudes of 100–250 m (330–820 ft)

== Diet ==
Neusticurus medemi preys upon insects.

== Reproduction ==
Neusticurus medemi is oviparous.
