= Neblinaphryne =

Scientific classification
- Kingdom: Animalia
- Phylum: Chordata
- Class: Amphibia
- Order: Anura
- Superfamily: Hyloidea
- Clade: Brachycephaloidea
- Family: Neblinaphrynidae; Fouquet et al., 2024
- Genus: Neblinaphryne; Fouquet et al., 2024

Species
- N. mayeri (type species) Fouquet et al., 2024; N. imeri Fouquet et al., 2024

Genus of frogs

Neblinaphryne is a genus of frog in the clade Brachycephaloidea. It contains two species, Neblinaphryne mayeri and Neblinaphryne imeri, and is the only member of the family Neblinaphrynidae. It is endemic to the highest parts of the Cerro de la Neblina tepui on the border of Brazil and Venezuela.

== Etymology ==
The genus name is a combination of neblina, the Portuguese word for mist, and phryne, Greek for toad. The specific name of the type species, N. mayeri, honors Brazilian army general Sinclair James Mayer, who helped organize research expeditions to the Pantepui region. The specific name of the second named species, N. imeri, refererences the discovery of the species in the Imeri mountain massif.

== Taxonomy ==
Neblinaphryne was described in 2024 alongside Caligophryne, another relict frog genus belonging to its own family that is also endemic to the Neblina massif; both are the first frog taxa described simultaneously as a new species, genus, and family since the purple frog (Nasikabatrachus sahyadrensis, Nasikabatrachidae) in 2003. Their persistence in the region supports the hypothesis of the tepuis serving as refugia for early Cenozoic taxa. In its 2024 description, Neblinaphryne was recovered as the sister group to all other Brachycephaloidea aside from Ceuthomantis, diverging from the group near the end of the Paleocene. In a publication later that year describing a second species, N. imeri, the genus was recovered as the earliest-diverging brachycephaloid clade, followed by Ceuthomantis.

== Threats ==
Due to its very restricted range at the highest reaches of the Neblina massif, N. mayeri is thought to be at high risk from climate change and potential introduction of pathogens like the amphibian fungal disease chytridiomycosis, and it has thus been recommended it be classified as critically endangered on the IUCN Red List.
