= Potamites ocellatus =

Conservation status
- Vulnerable (IUCN 3.1)

Scientific classification
- Kingdom: Animalia
- Phylum: Chordata
- Class: Reptilia
- Order: Squamata
- Suborder: Lacertoidea
- Family: Gymnophthalmidae
- Genus: Potamites
- Species: P. ocellatus

Binomial name
- Potamites ocellatus (Sinitsin, 1930)

Species of lizard

Potamites ocellatus is a species of lizard in the family Gymnophthalmidae. It is endemic to Bolivia.
