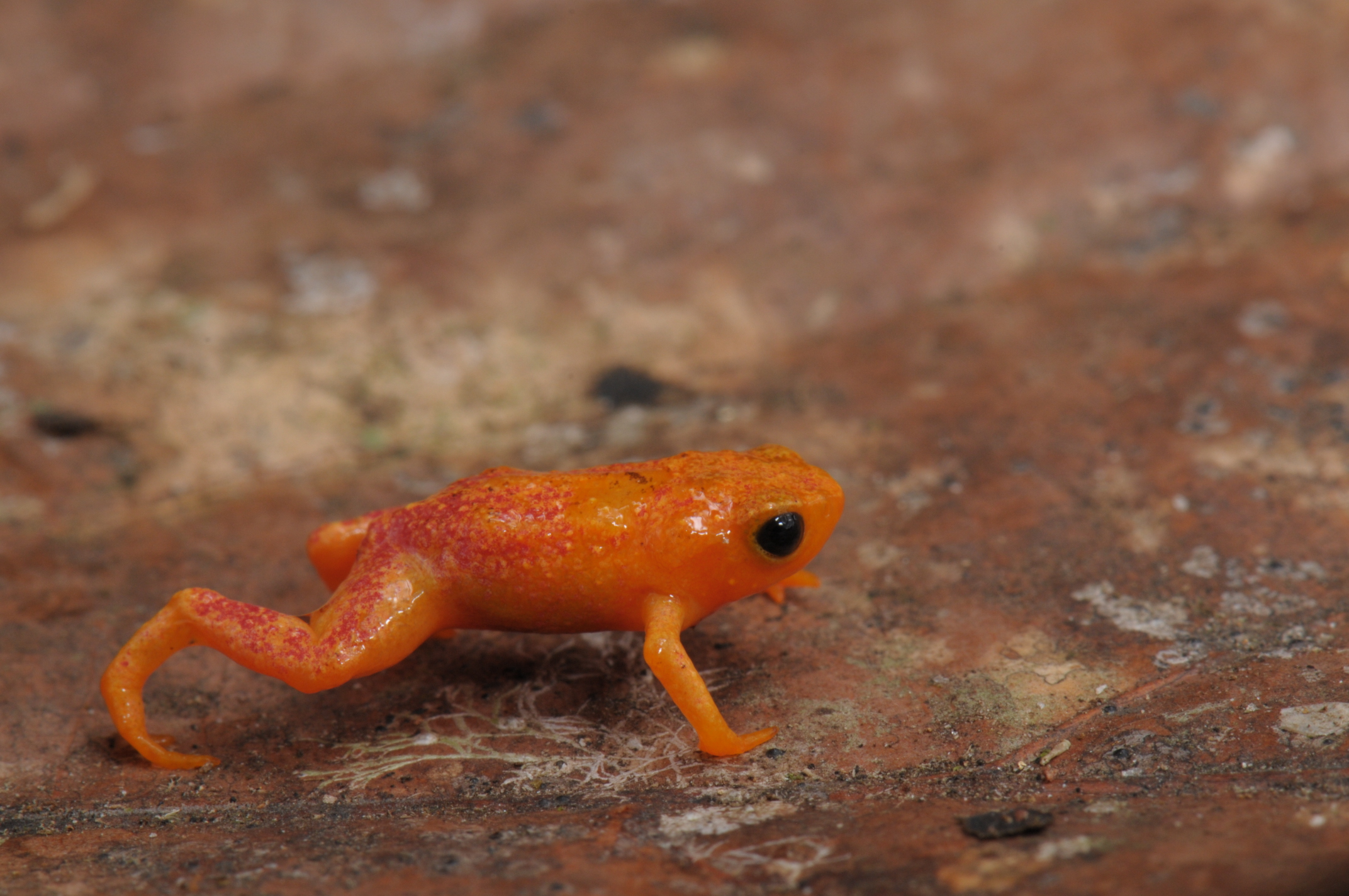
- Brachycephalus pitanga
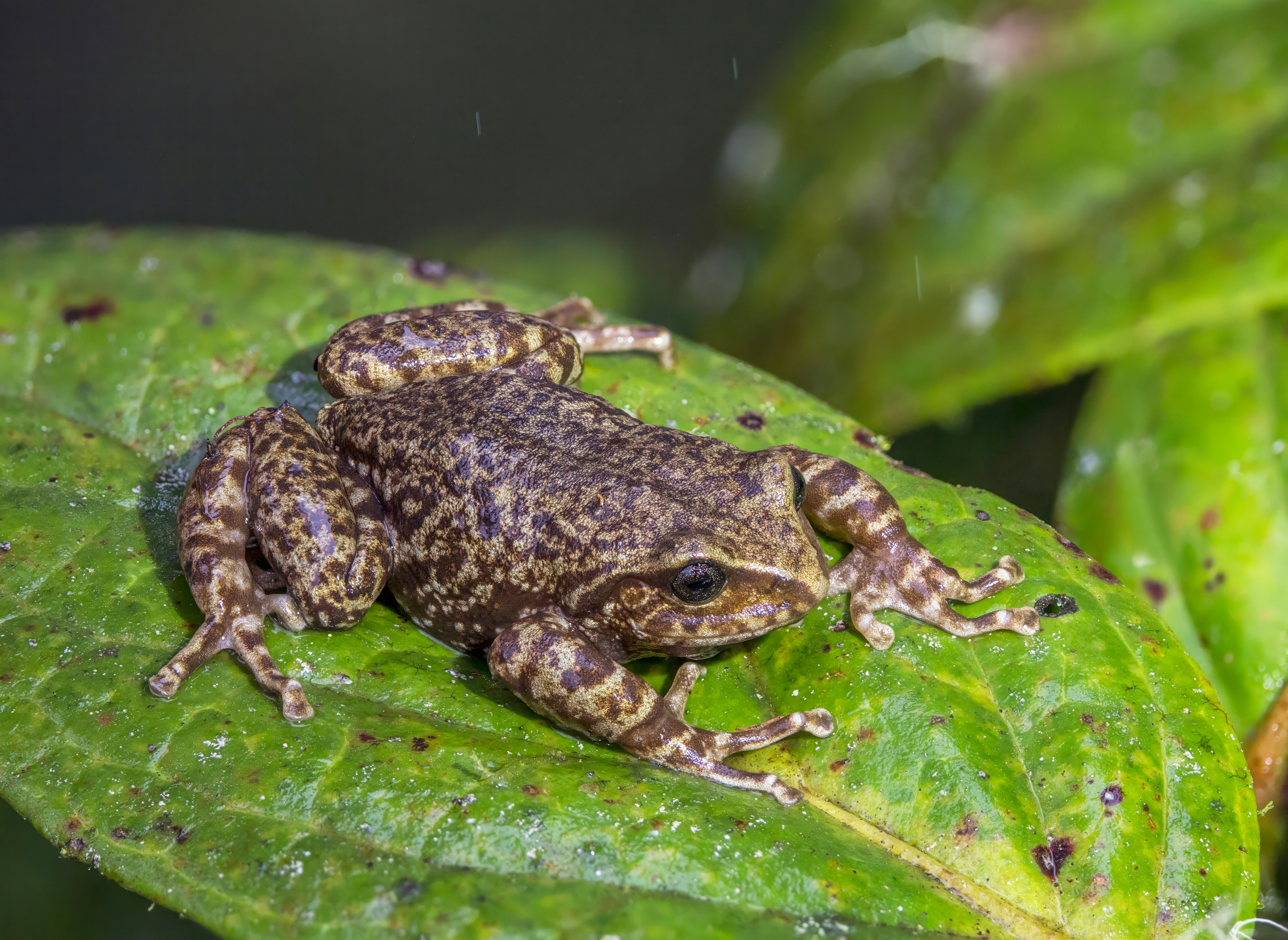
- Pristimantis elegans

Scientific classification
- Kingdom: Animalia
- Phylum: Chordata
- Class: Amphibia
- Order: Anura
- Superfamily: Hyloidea
- Clade: Brachycephaloidea

Families
- Brachycephalidae; Caligophrynidae; Ceuthomantidae; Craugastoridae; Eleutherodactylidae; Neblinaphrynidae; Strabomantidae

= Brachycephaloidea =

Brachycephaloids

Clade of frogs

Brachycephaloidea (or Terrarana) is a large monophyletic unranked clade of direct-developing frogs including more than 1,100 species, comprising about 15% of named frog species. Brachycephaloids inhabit the New World tropics, subtropics, and Andean regions. The group has undergone extensive changes in its taxonomy thanks to multiple molecular phylogenetic analyses in recent years. Until 2008, these species were placed in a single, large family (Brachycephalidae).

The diverse Brachycephaloidea contains several notable taxa. It includes the smallest known vertebrates, in the genus Brachycephalus (family Brachycephalidae): B. pulex and B. dacnis. It also holds the most specious vertebrate genus, Pristimantis (family Strabomantidae).

The cladogram below illustrates the relationships between families in the Brachycephaloidea, following Fouquet et al. (2024):

- Brachycephaloidea
  - Ceuthomantidae
  - - Neblinaphrynidae
    - - - Craugastoridae
        - Strabomantidae
      - - Eleutherodactylidae
        - - Caligophrynidae
          - Brachycephalidae
