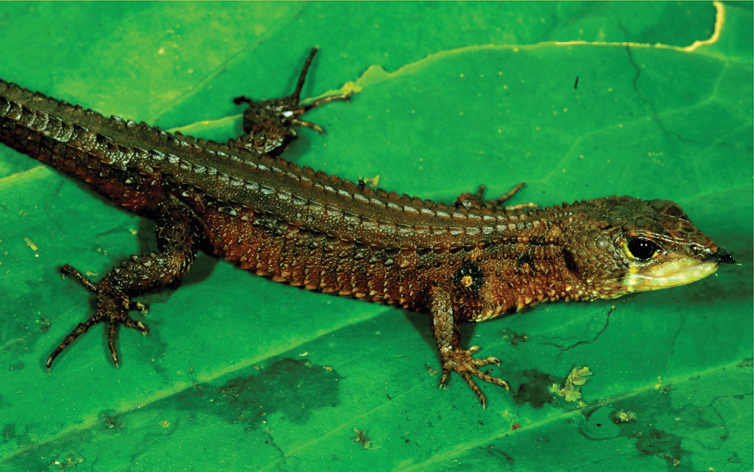

Conservation status
- Least Concern (IUCN 3.1)

Scientific classification
- Kingdom: Animalia
- Phylum: Chordata
- Class: Reptilia
- Order: Squamata
- Suborder: Lacertoidea
- Family: Gymnophthalmidae
- Genus: Potamites
- Species: P. ecpleopus

Binomial name
- Potamites ecpleopus (Cope, 1875)

Synonyms
- Neusticurus ecpleopus COPE 1876: 161 Neusticurus bicarinatus — GUICHENOT 1855: 30 Neusticurus ecpleopus — O'SHAUGHNESSY 1879: 295 Neusticurus tuberculatus SHREVE 1935: 209 Neusticurus ecpleopus — UZZELL 1966: 290 Neusticurus ecpleopus — PETERS et al. 1970: 207 Neusticurus ecpleopus — DUELLMAN 1978: 218 Neusticurus ecpleopus — DIRKSEN & DE LA RIVA 1999 Neusticurus ocellatus — DIRKSEN & DE LA RIVA 1999 Neusticurus ecpleopus — CASTOE et al. 2004 Potamites ecpleopus — DOAN & CASTOE et al. 2005 Neusticurus ecpleopus — COSTA-PRUDENTE et al. 2013 Neusticurus ecpleopus — MORATO et al. 2014

= Potamites ecpleopus =

Species of lizard

Potamites ecpleopus, the common stream lizard , is a species of lizard in the family Gymnophthalmidae. It is found in Colombia, Ecuador, Bolivia, Brazil, and Peru.
