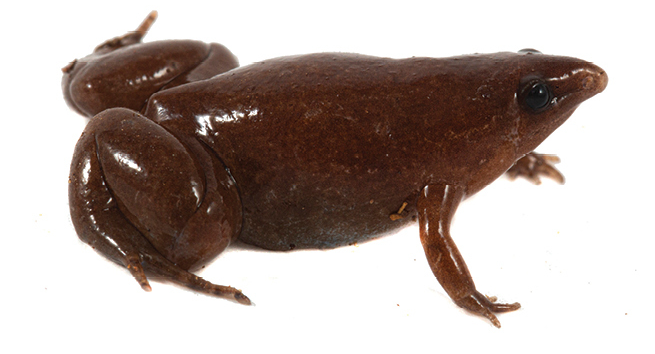

Scientific classification
- Kingdom: Animalia
- Phylum: Chordata
- Class: Amphibia
- Order: Anura
- Family: Microhylidae
- Subfamily: Otophryninae
- Genus: Synapturanus; A. L. Carvalho, 1954

Type species
- Synapturanus mirandaribeiroi Nelson and Lescure, 1975

Species
- 7 species (see text)

= Synapturanus =

Genus of amphibians

Synapturanus is a genus of microhylid frogs. They are found in northern South America. The common name disc frogs has been coined for the genus. Because of their fossorial life style, their natural history is poorly known.

== Ecology and behavior ==
Synapturanus are fossorial and mostly nocturnal tropical rainforest frogs found in the leaf litter and soft soils. Calling takes place usually during rain, which apparently triggers the calling. Eggs are deposited terrestrially in a small burrow below the soil surface. The tadpoles are endotrophic (developing without external food sources). Stomach contents have included nematodes and various arthropods (ants, termites, and spiders).

== Description ==
Females are larger than males. Breeding males have a glandular swelling on the wrist. Males and females are otherwise similar. The largest species is Synapturanus mirandaribeiroi, which reaches a snout–vent length of at least 37 mm (1.5 in).

== Species ==
This genus has ten recognized species:

Binomial name and author	Common name
Synapturanus ajuricaba Fouquet, Leblanc, Fabre, Rodrigues, Menin, Courtois, Dewynter, Hölting, Ernst, Peloso, and Kok, 2021
Synapturanus artifex Osorno-Muñoz, Gutiérrez-Lamus, Lynch, Keefe, Caicedo-Portilla, Chan, Tonini, and de Sá, 2023
Synapturanus danta Chávez, Thompson, Sánchez, Chávez-Arribasplata and Catenazzi, 2022	Tapir frog
Synapturanus latebrosus Osorno-Muñoz, Gutiérrez-Lamus, Lynch, Keefe, Caicedo-Portilla, Chan, Tonini, and de Sá, 2023
Synapturanus mesomorphus Fouquet, Leblanc, Fabre, Rodrigues, Menin, Courtois, Dewynter, Hölting, Ernst, Peloso, and Kok, 2021
Synapturanus mirandaribeiroi Nelson and Lescure, 1975	Miranda's disc frog
Synapturanus rabus Pyburn, 1977	Vaupes disc frog
Synapturanus sacratus Osorno-Muñoz, Gutiérrez-Lamus, Lynch, Keefe, Caicedo-Portilla, Chan, Tonini, and de Sá, 2023
Synapturanus salseri Pyburn, 1975	Timbo disc frog
Synapturanus zombie Fouquet, Leblanc, Fabre, Rodrigues, Menin, Courtois, Dewynter, Hölting, Ernst, Peloso, and Kok, 2021	Zombie frog
