= Synapturanus mirandaribeiroi =

Conservation status
- Least Concern (IUCN 3.1)

Scientific classification
- Kingdom: Animalia
- Phylum: Chordata
- Class: Amphibia
- Order: Anura
- Family: Microhylidae
- Genus: Synapturanus
- Species: S. mirandaribeiroi

Binomial name
- Synapturanus mirandaribeiroi Nelson & Lescure, 1975

Species of frog

Synapturanus mirandaribeiroi (Spanish: Synapturan De Miranda-ribeiro) is a species of frog in the family Microhylidae. It is found in Brazil, Colombia, French Guiana, Guyana, Suriname, and Venezuela. Its natural habitat is subtropical or tropical moist lowland forests. It is threatened by habitat loss.
