= Synapturanus rabus =

Conservation status
- Least Concern (IUCN 3.1)

Scientific classification
- Kingdom: Animalia
- Phylum: Chordata
- Class: Amphibia
- Order: Anura
- Family: Microhylidae
- Genus: Synapturanus
- Species: S. rabus

Binomial name
- Synapturanus rabus Pyburn, 1976

Species of frog

Synapturanus rabus is a species of frog in the family Microhylidae. It is found in Colombia, Ecuador, possibly Brazil, and possibly Peru. Its natural habitats are subtropical or tropical moist lowland forests and freshwater springs. It is threatened by habitat loss.
