= Neusticurus rudis =

Scientific classification
- Domain: Eukaryota
- Kingdom: Animalia
- Phylum: Chordata
- Class: Reptilia
- Order: Squamata
- Family: Gymnophthalmidae
- Genus: Neusticurus
- Species: N. rudis

Binomial name
- Neusticurus rudis Boulenger, 1900

Species of lizard

Neusticurus rudis, the red neusticurus, is a species of lizard in the family Gymnophthalmidae. It is found in Guyana and Venezuela.
