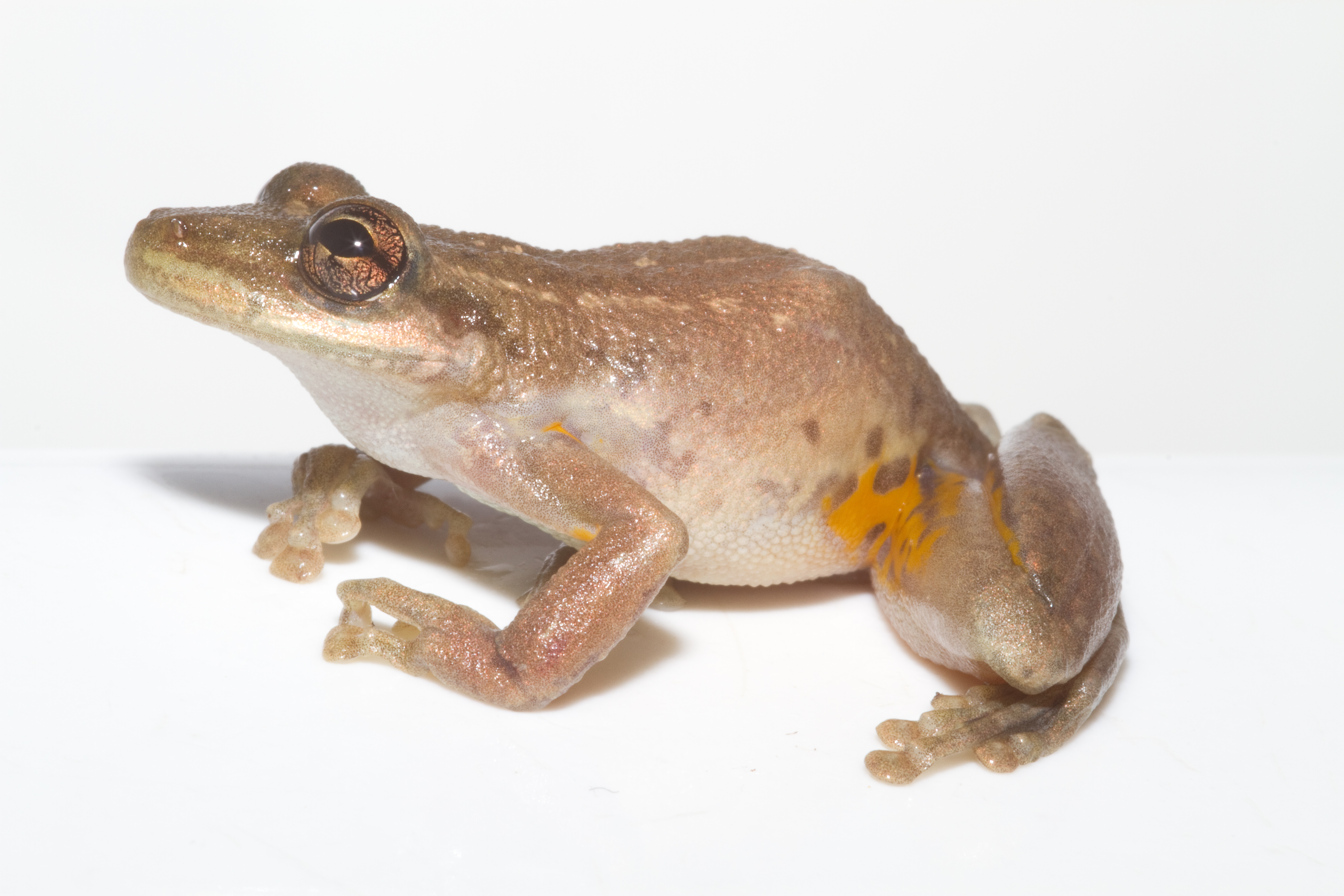

Conservation status
- Least Concern (IUCN 3.1)

Scientific classification
- Kingdom: Animalia
- Phylum: Chordata
- Class: Amphibia
- Order: Anura
- Family: Hylidae
- Genus: Scinax
- Species: S. ruber

Binomial name
- Scinax ruber (Laurenti, 1768)

Synonyms
- Hyla rubra Laurenti, 1768; Hyla coerulea Spix, 1824; Hyla conirostris Peters, 1863; Hyla lateristriga Spix, 1824; Scytopis alleni Cope, 1870 "1869"; Scinax alleni (Cope, 1870)

= Scinax ruber =

Species of amphibian

Scinax ruber is a species of frog in the family Hylidae which is known in English as the red snouted treefrog or red-snouted treefrog, sometimes also Allen's snouted treefrog, the latter referring to the now-synonymized Scinax alleni. This widespread species is found in much of Amazonian and northern coastal South America and into Panama, as well as in some Caribbean islands as introduced populations. It is a complex containing several cryptic species.

== Range ==
S. ruber is widespread from sea level to around 2,600 metres throughout the Amazon Basin and the Guiana Shield in South America (in Brazil, Colombia, Ecuador, French Guiana, Guyana, Peru, Suriname, and Venezuela). It is also found in central Panama and the eastern lowlands of Darien Province in Panama, as well as in Trinidad and Tobago. It is an introduced species on Martinique, Puerto Rico, and Saint Lucia. It is considered an invasive species on Martinique, threatening native frogs.

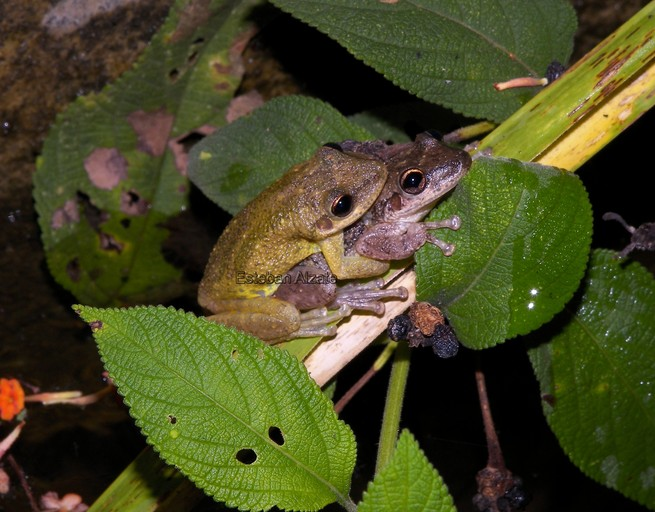
Pair of Scinax ruber in amplexus

== Description ==
Adult males measure 29–41 mm (1.1–1.6 in) and adult females 37–44 mm (1.5–1.7 in) in snout–vent length. The snout is rounded and non-acuminate. The tympanum is distinct. Dorsal skin is smooth to finely tuberculate. The dorsum is tan to dull green usually with wide creamy tan to yellow dorsolateral stripe with dark borders that extends from the eyelid to the sacrum. Also a discontinuous tan middorsal is usually present. The flanks are cream with yellow spots, usually edged with black in groin. The posterior surfaces of thighs are brown mottled with yellow or orange mottling. The iris is bronze with black reticulations. The ventrer is yellow.

== Habitat and conservation ==
S. ruber is abundant in temporary waterbodies during the rainy season, and occupies a wide range of habitats, from open environments to moist forests, as well as gardens and parks. It occurs from sea level to 2,600 m (8,500 ft) above sea level. It is a nocturnal and arboreal species that generally breeds in small temporary pools, but can also use roadside ditches.

This common and widespread species is not facing any major threats and is classed by the IUCN as of "least concern". It is adaptable and also present in many protected areas.
