= Synapturanus salseri =

Conservation status
- Least Concern (IUCN 3.1)

Scientific classification
- Kingdom: Animalia
- Phylum: Chordata
- Class: Amphibia
- Order: Anura
- Family: Microhylidae
- Genus: Synapturanus
- Species: S. salseri

Binomial name
- Synapturanus salseri Pyburn, 1975

Species of frog

Synapturanus salseri is a species of frog in the family Microhylidae. It lives in Brazil, Colombia, and Venezuela. Its natural habitats are subtropical or tropical moist lowland forests and freshwater springs. It is threatened by habitat loss.

Synapturanus salseri are shy and spend almost all of their time in burrows beneath the forest floor. During the rainy season, males give off a brief whistle as a mating call. They mate only after periods of heavy precipitation. Mating takes place in burrows, since these frogs seldom venture out. Females lay a few large eggs into the burrow. The hatched tadpoles do not feed but live on the stored yolk until they undergo metamorphosis. The diet of adult S. salseri frogs consists of ants and spiders (Zweifel, 2003).

The frog was originally discovered by William F. Pyburn (former head of the biology department of the University of Texas at Arlington) and J. K. Salser Jr., an amateur biologist. While collecting specimens in the Colombian rain forest near the village of Timbo on the Vaupes River, Pyburn heard the frog call. Using flashlights to triangulate the call the two determined where the call originated and began searching for the frog. After the leaf litter on the forest floor had been removed it became apparent that the frog was underground and it was captured after a careful excavation.

== Sources ==
- CalPhotos Synapturanus salseri; Timbo Disc Frog (detail page)
