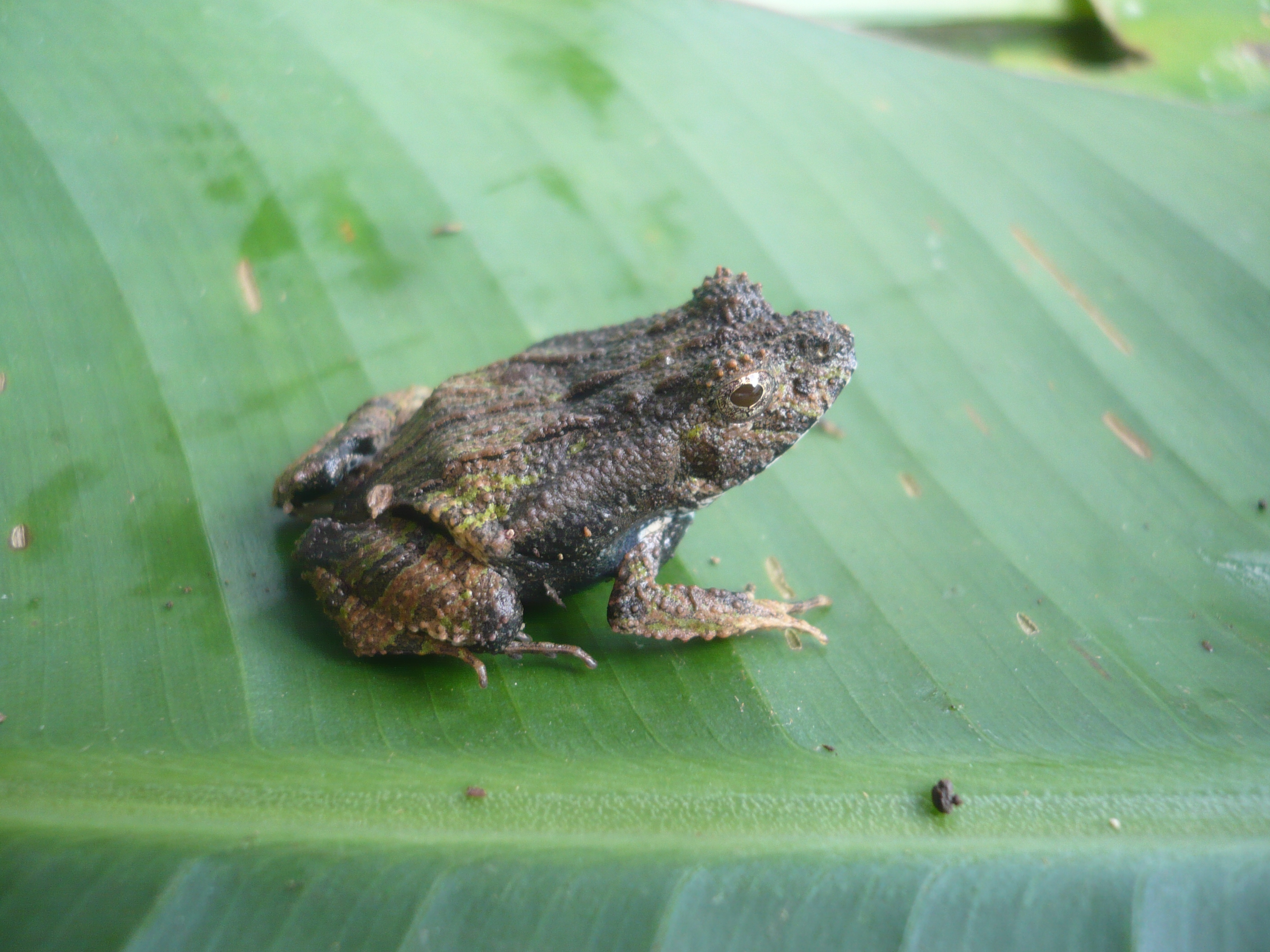

Conservation status
- Least Concern (IUCN 3.1)

Scientific classification
- Kingdom: Animalia
- Phylum: Chordata
- Class: Amphibia
- Order: Anura
- Family: Leptodactylidae
- Genus: Edalorhina
- Species: E. perezi

Binomial name
- Edalorhina perezi Jiménez de la Espada, 1871

Synonyms
- Bubonias plicifrons Cope, 1874; Edalorhina buckleyi Boulenger, 1882

= Edalorhina perezi =

Species of frog

Edalorhina perezi (Perez's snouted frog) is a species of frog in the family Leptodactylidae. It is one of the only two species in the genus Edalorhina in the family Leptodactylidae. This species is diurnal and terrestrial. During mating season both female and male frogs gather around treefall pools. It is found in Brazil, Colombia, Ecuador, and Peru, and Bolivia. Its natural habitats are subtropical or tropical moist lowland forests and subtropical or tropical moist montane forests. It has also been found in open areas in secondary forest and on cacao plantations. The species listed as least concern on the IUCN Red List and the population is stable.

== Description ==
=== General Identification ===
==== Adult ====
Similar to many other frog species, female Perez's snouted frogs (E. perezi) are larger than males. Males are on average 28–36 mm (1.1–1.4 in) in size and the females are 35–40 mm (1.4–1.6 in). The general color of this frog is very similar to leaf litter, which is a cryptic color protection in its habitat. Dorsum skin color is brown and there are usually many random dark brown markings on the back, such as tubercles and longitudinal ridges. Distinct characteristics of this frog include its eyelids, which have conical tubercles growing around the edge, a vertical ridge between the eyes, and the underdeveloped vomerine teeth. The iris is bronze and has some radiating grayish-brown lines. The body is a concaved shape with the spine dips down, differentiating the species from its sister taxon. The ventral side is smooth and white, with large black dots at lateral and posterior areas. The limbs are barred and the groin has an orange color decorated with black dots. It has unwebbed toes as a terrestrial frog species, and the first and second toes are of equal length. The snout of this frog is pointed, but the mouth part of the other species E. nasuta in the same genus looks sharper because of a long, fleshy proboscis. This sister species also differs from E. perezi by having smaller eyelid tubercles. A similar species from another genus is Engystomops petersi, which also has an orange groin, but this species doesn't has eyelid tubercles and has a different black and white belly pattern. It also has a gray throat and chest that is also different from the Perez's snouted frog. There are several small but marked differences between them and their closely related species.

==== Offspring ====
Tadpoles in genus Edalorhina, which is the genus of the Perez's snouted frog, are generally similar to most tadpoles of closely related taxa, but they have a distinct terminal oral discs. The existence of a dextral vent tube is a common trait for the clade consisting of Edalorhina, Engystomops, and Physalaemus. Within the clade, Edalorhina is unique for having two lingual papillae bordered around the anteroventrally directed mouth, a filiform median ridge, and a lack of buccal roof papillae. The total head-tail length ranges from 14 to 29.7 mm (0.55 to 1.17 in). The body length is around 5 mm (0.20 in) and is wider than it is deep. The tadpoles have small eyes that are widely separated at each side of the front of the body. The nostril position has been described dorsolaterally and anterolaterally. The oral disc has also been described both as terminal and ventral. These contradictory descriptions might reflect the intraspecific diversity of the tadpoles. E. perezi tadpoles have a posteriorly directed sinistral spiracles and a short anal tube. The dorsal fin only grows on the tail. The general color of the tadpole is pale brown with streaks of darker brown shades dorsally and laterally.

== Taxonomy ==
Perez's snouted frog, Edalorhina perezi, is in the genus Edalorhina and family Leptodactylidae. The only two species in this genus are E. perezi and E. nasuta. Previous studies addressing phylogeny have mostly focusing on morphological, behavioral and karyotypical differences. An earlier morphological and behavioral study considered Edalorhina to be most closely related to the families Lithodytes and Physalaemus as all of them construct foam nests. In a later cytogenetics study, the analysis of all 22 chromosomes of this frog also suggested the close relationship between Edalorhina and Physalaemus, while Pleurodema is relatively less related to Edalorhina. However, the precise phylogenetic relationships of Edalorhina are still under a debate.

== Geographical variation ==
Studies have shown that there are large variations in Perez's snouted frog's morphology. An early study conducted by Dunn in 1949 examined 52 specimens and revealed dissimilarity in vomerine teeth and dorsal skin structure. The study classified this species into three morphs: perezi, plicifrons and buckleyi. The Perezi type has a dermal ridge between the eyes and vomerine teeth, but it lacks longitudinal warts on the back. Plicifrons, on the other hand, has longitudinal warts, but lacks vomerine teeth and dermal ridge. Buckleyi looks similar to Plicifrons, but it has vomerine teeth. Dunn also noticed that certain appearances are more common in distinct areas of the species' range. For example, 86.6% of the specimens from Ecuador are perezi type, while in the Peruvian specimens this type only accounts for 62.5%. There are also other obvious geographical differences, such as absence of vomerine teeth and the development of a wart on the snout tip. A later study in 1990 by Duellman dug deeper into this topic by looking into dorsal skin structure and ventral color pattern. The dorsal patterns were classified into five categories based on smoothness, and each geographical area was dominated by populations of a specific type of pattern. The ventral color was also classified into five groups based on the pattern of black and white patches. The range of each group is highly correlated with the distribution of river systems, which include Rio Purus, Rio Madre de Dios, Rio Ucayali, and Rio Tapiche. One explanation for why populations of Perez's snout frog differ so much from each other is historical climatic-ecological changes. During Pleistocene, the rivers coming down from Andes carried a greater volume of melting glacier water than today, thus isolating the frogs into different basins and causing these populations to evolve independently. The present-day pattern categories also correspond to geographical segregation in history.

== Habitat and distribution ==
Perez's snouted frog is commonly found in the upper Amazon Basin in Ecuador and Peru. Its sister species E. nasuta has a much smaller range and is only found in Peru. Some populations of E. perezi are also documented in southern Colombia and Brazil. They range from basins that are only 200m in elevation to 1100m on the eastern slopes of the Andes Mountains. They are a diurnal and terrestrial frog species. Typical habitats are forest floors covered with leaf litter in lowland tropical rainforests. They are well adapted to both primary and secondary forests.

== Diet ==
Perez's snouted frog is a "sit-and-wait" predator that relies on its cryptic coloration to hide from prey. This allows the frog to prey on mobile arthropods such as cockroaches, spiders, and crickets in the leaf litter. It is thought E. perezi only feeds a few times per day.

Tadpoles primarily feed on detritus in the bottom of the pools where they hatch, although there have been reports of tadpoles cannibalizing eggs and other larvae.

== Mating ==
Perez's snouted frogs breed opportunistically, usually right after a storm. During amplexus, females usually carry males to the edge of the pool, where they build foam nests together. Water is important for nest making so females always drink water before amplexus. The female is attracted by male's advertisement call and moves towards the calling male. During mating season, the frog is equally active during the day and night. Amplexus can last as long as six days, but the actual mating only takes place for four to six hours. The female first releases a signal for foam nest construction by arching its back. Then, the male immediately puts its feet near the female's cloacal region and forms a collecting basket, where fertilization occurs. After this, the male raises its legs to water level and starts to beat the female's foam secretion with the purpose of smoothing the surface. The beating lasts about 10–12 seconds with about 45 beats. After 45 seconds the female does the back-arching signal again, and the whole set of movements repeat. The construction of a foam nest usually takes 30 to 60 minutes.

=== Calls and Vocalizations ===
Male Perez's snouted frogs can produce different types of sounds, but a typical one that can be heard from long distance is considered as an advertisement call, which consists of a series of three to five short, low whistles and two pulses per note. There is also another pre-mating call that has double pulses and a constant repetition rate. The dominant frequency is 1800–2700 Hz, and harmonics are concentrated at 4500-5600 and 700–7800 Hz.

Male calling site choice is slightly different from female oviposition site choice because they face different selective pressures. Although both females and males avoid high-predation risk pools and benefit from a high offspring survival rate, males are less sensitive to the potential biotic and abiotic risks offspring will face. When choosing a site, male frogs focus more on predation avoidance and reducing competition for females, but females consider more about potential offspring survival. Thus, male are more likely to use a place that is poor for offspring but has a low predation risk and low competition for mates.

== Parental care ==
Female Perez's snouted frogs breed every four weeks under laboratory conditions. Females lay 30-154 small unpigmented eggs, 2.1 mm in diameter, in a foam nest about 60mm. The foam nest protects eggs and early tadpoles. In ideal conditions foam can protect tadpoles in dry pools for up to 13 days, with 50% survival up to 10 days. However, to complete larval development, at least two weeks in water is needed. Thus, in a neotropical forest with stable temperature but seasonal rainfall, the uncertainty of precipitation has a strong influence on the frog's reproductive success.

Perez's snouted frog prefer treefall pools (holes at the roots of large fallen trees), either temporal or permanent, to lay their eggs. These kind of treefall holes are a common nesting site for many other tree frogs and poison-dart frogs. A three-year study done by Murphy demonstrated the risk-sensitive oviposition strategy of Perez's snouted frogs. The three major risks for Perez's snouted frog offspring are desiccation, insect predation, and intraspecific competition. For the two external risks, desiccation and predation, there is always a trade-off because predation risk is lower in temporal pools, but the temporary pools can potentially be completely dry. A mark-recapture experiment proved that adults actively select pools that benefit their offspring most based on these three factors. Their decisions are very flexible as they vary across both temporal and spatial scales, instead of being fixed and passively triggered by seasonal changes. In the early rainy season, females normally choose persistent pools, but they switch to ephemeral pools later in the season. This trend is reflected both by change in nest placement and tadpole density in each type of pool across time. The reasoning behind this phenomenon is that rainfall in the transitional period is highly uncertain, so persistent pools provide more stable environment. Later in the season, rainfall becomes more consistent and persistent pools build up insect predators and higher densities of tadpoles, which makes temporal pools relatively better with a lower predation risk and less intense food competition. Female egg-laying position choice is not affected by male calling sites. After mating, females can carry the male to her favorite egg-laying site.

== Reproduction and life cycle ==
=== Hatching & Tadpole development ===
Tadpoles start to hatch from eggs three to five days after nest construction at 26 °C (79 °F). The newly emerged tadpoles are white and immobile. They still contain yolk in the gut and lack external gills and adhesive organs. They remain at the bottom of the nest for one day and start feeding the next day. Their color changes from white to cryptic brownish color during week three, and the froglets leave during the fourth week after hatching. Once the tadpoles enter the water, lots of invertebrate predators such as the damselfly, dragonfly, predaceous beetle, and even some vertebrate predators such as the turtle Platemys platicephala can prey on Perez's snouted frog tadpoles. The time required for a tadpole to develop before it goes through metamorphosis from tadpole to froglet is highly variable, with a range of 21–28 days. Many factors such as pool drying rate, depth, temperature, resource availability, and predator and tadpole density can have an effect.

== Protective coloration and behavior ==
Tadpoles start to develop cryptic brown colorations three weeks after hatching, which persist through adulthoods. An interesting predator defense display of the Perez's snouted frog is deimatic behavior using their macroglands. Macroglands are also called inguinal or lumbar glands, which are accumulations of serous glands in the sacral region. Although not all species in the family Leiuperinae have this structure, it is commonly found in the Leiperines, Edalorhina, Engystomops, Physalaemus, and Pleurodema families. When a Perez's snouted frog is frightened, it will face away from the predator and elevate its sacral region to suddenly expose macroglands, which display hidden flash coloration resembling a pair of huge eyes belonging to a large animal.
