= Dwarf frog =

Dwarf frog may refer to:

- African dwarf frog (Hymenochirus), a genus of frogs native to Africa
- Beddome's dwarf wrinkled frog (Nyctibatrachus beddomii), a frog in the family Nyctibatrachidae endemic to southern Western Ghats, India
- Colorado dwarf frog (Engystomops coloradorum), a frog in the family Leptodactylidae endemic to Ecuador
- Cuyaba dwarf frog (Physalaemus nattereri), a frog in the family Leptodactylidae native to Brazil and eastern Bolivia and Paraguay
- Dwarf puddle frog (Phrynobatrachus), a genus of frogs in the family Phrynobatrachidae found in Sub-Saharan Africa
- Dwarf reed frog (Hyperolius pusillus), a frog in the family Hyperoliidae found in eastern and southern Africa (Botswana, Eswatini, Kenya, Malawi, Mozambique, Somalia, South Africa, Tanzania, Zimbabwe)
- Dwarf rocket frog (Litoria dorsalis), is a frog in the family Hylidae found in Papua New Guinea and possibly Indonesia
- Dwarf swamp frog (Pseudopaludicola), a genus of frog in the family Leptodactylidae found in South America
- Golden dwarf reed frog (Afrixalus aureus), a frog in the family Hyperoliidae found in Eswatini, Mozambique, South Africa, and possibly Zimbabwe
- Guayaquil dwarf frog (Engystomops pustulatus), a species of frog in the family Leptodactylidae found in southwestern Ecuador and northwestern Peru
- Merlin's dwarf gray frog (Pseudhymenochirus merlini), a frog in the family Pipidae found in Guinea, Guinea-Bissau, and Sierra Leone
- Mjöberg's dwarf litter frog (Leptobrachella mjobergi), a frog in the family Megophryidae endemic to Borneo
- Peters' dwarf frog (Engystomops petersi), a frog in the family Leptodactylidae found in Amazonian Colombia, Ecuador, and Peru
