= Engystomops randi =

Conservation status
- Least Concern (IUCN 3.1)

Scientific classification
- Kingdom: Animalia
- Phylum: Chordata
- Class: Amphibia
- Order: Anura
- Family: Leptodactylidae
- Genus: Engystomops
- Species: E. randi

Binomial name
- Engystomops randi (Ron, Cannatella & Coloma, 2004)

Synonyms
- Physalaemus randi Ron, Cannatella & Coloma, 2004

Species of frog

Engystomops randi is a species of frog in the family Leptodactylidae. It is endemic to western Ecuador.

== Description ==
The adult male frog measures 17.10–18.65 mm (0.673–0.734 in) in snout-vent length and the adult female frog 17.34–19.73 mm (0.683–0.777 in). The skin of the dorsum is gray-brown in color with darker marks in the shape of the letter V. The interorbital area is brown in color. There is a white line on the mouth that extends under the eye and tympanum. The tympanum is dark gray in color. The flanks are dark gray in color. The front legs are yellow-bronze in color with some darker marks. The belly is brown or cream-white in color with dark brown marks on the chest. The iris of the eye is dark brown in color.

== Etymology ==
Scientists named the frog for Stanley Rand, who collected many herpetological samples and participated in studies.

== Habitat ==
This frog lives in coastal forests. This frog has shown some tolerance to human disturbance. People also find it in pastures, banana plantations, and flooded rice paddies. Scientists have seen it between 10 and 984 m (30 and 3,230 ft) above sea level. Scientists have seen the frog in protected places.

Scientists have seen this frog in protected places Bosque Deciduo de la Costa, Bosque Húmedo Tropical del Chocó, Reserva Ecológica Manglares Churute, and Bosque Petrificado de Puyango.

== Reproduction ==
These frogs have young in ponds. They deposit the eggs in foam nests. Scientists believe this frog reproduces by larval development, like its congeners.

== Threats ==
The IUCN classifies this frog as least concern of extinction.

== Original description ==
- Ron, S.R.; Cannatella, D.C.; Coloma, L.A. (2004). "Two new species of Physalaemus (Anura: Leptodactylidae) from western Ecuador". Herpetologica (Abstract). 60 (2): 261–275. doi:10.1655/03-14.
