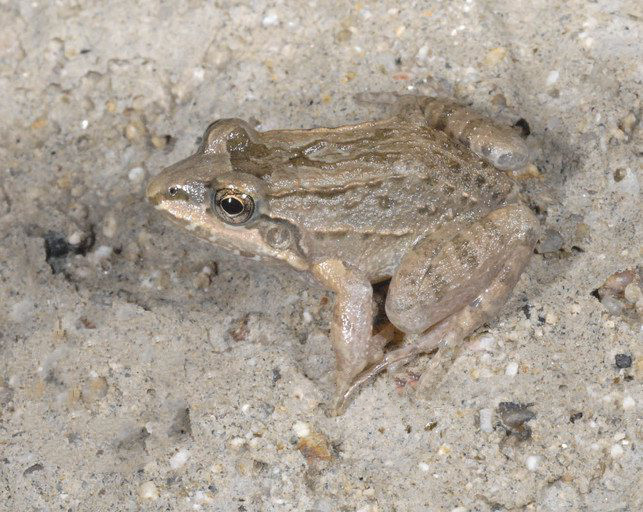

Conservation status
- Least Concern (IUCN 3.1)

Scientific classification
- Kingdom: Animalia
- Phylum: Chordata
- Class: Amphibia
- Order: Anura
- Family: Leptodactylidae
- Genus: Leptodactylus
- Species: L. labrosus

Binomial name
- Leptodactylus labrosus Jiménez de la Espada, 1875

Synonyms
- Leptodactylus curtus Barbour & Noble, 1920

= Leptodactylus labrosus =

Species of frog

Leptodactylus labrosus is a species of frog in the family Leptodactylidae. It is found in Ecuador and Peru.

== Description ==
The adult male frog measures 49.2–61.5 mm in snout-vent length and the adult female frog measures 39.9–69.0 mm. This frog has prominent eyes that protrude from the head.

== Etymology ==
Scientists named the frog labrosus, the Latin word for "wide lip."

== Habitat ==
This frog lives in dry habitats, such as scrubland, and in forests with at least some deciduous trees, though it has occasionally been found in evergreen forests, at the edges of forests, or on farms. This nocturnal, terrestrial frog has been found on the leaf litter and other microhabitats with some humidity. This frog is awake at night. Scientists observed the frog between 0 and 1300 meters above sea level.

Scientists have seen the frog in protected places: Machalilla National Park, Manglares Churute National Park, and Mache Chindu National Park. They think it could also live in Parque Nacional Cerros de Amotape and El Angolo Game Preserve.

== Diet ==
The adult frog eats terrestrial invertebrates, such as ants, earthworms, slugs, and caterpillars.

== Reproduction ==
The female frog deposits her eggs in holes near water. Later, water floods the holes and the tadpoles swim out.

== Threats ==
Scientists from the IUCN say this frog is not in danger of dying out.
