= Pristimantis pseudoacuminatus =

Conservation status
- Least Concern (IUCN 3.1)

Scientific classification
- Kingdom: Animalia
- Phylum: Chordata
- Class: Amphibia
- Order: Anura
- Family: Strabomantidae
- Genus: Pristimantis
- Subgenus: Pristimantis
- Species: P. pseudoacuminatus

Binomial name
- Pristimantis pseudoacuminatus (Shreve, 1935)

Synonyms
- Eleutherodactylus pseudoacuminatus Shreve, 1935

Species of frog

Pristimantis pseudoacuminatus, also known as Sarayacu robber frog, is a species of frog in the family Strabomantidae. It is found in the Amazon basin in Colombia, Ecuador, and Peru.

== Description ==
Adult males measure 13–18 mm (0.5–0.7 in) and adult females 18–22 mm (0.7–0.9 in) in snout–vent length. The dorsum is warty; also the eyelids bear warts. The canthus rostralis is strongly marked and incurved. The holotype, in preserved condition, has a brownish pinkish ground color. There are minute black punctillations and narrow dark brown to black streaks running over the canthus and the tympanum. There is also an obscure interocular streak. The lower parts are immaculate apart from some faint stippling on the throat the jaws.

== Habitat and conservation ==
Pristimantis pseudoacuminatus inhabits primary and secondary forests and flooded forests at elevations of 330–570 m (1,080–1,870 ft) above sea level. It is primarily nocturnal and occurs both among leaf litter on the ground and in low vegetation, often in epiphytes. Reproduction is presumably direct, without free-living larval stage.

This species uncommon but widespread. It can be locally threatened by habitat loss caused by deforestation, agricultural development, and illegal crops. It occurs in the La Payas Nature Reserve in Colombia and its range overlaps with the Limoncocha National Biological Reserve and Yasuni National Park in Ecuador.
