= Engystomops guayaco =

Conservation status
- Vulnerable (IUCN 3.1)

Scientific classification
- Kingdom: Animalia
- Phylum: Chordata
- Class: Amphibia
- Order: Anura
- Family: Leptodactylidae
- Genus: Engystomops
- Species: E. guayaco

Binomial name
- Engystomops guayaco (Ron, Coloma & Cannatella, 2005)

Synonyms
- Physalaemus guayaco Ron, Coloma & Cannatella, 2005

Species of frog

Engystomops guayaco is a species of frog in the family Leptodactylidae. It is endemic to Ecuador.

== Description ==
The adult male frog measures 15.45–19.38 mm in snout-vent length and the adult female frog 16.77–20.98 mm. The skin of the dorsum can be brown or gray-brown in color. Some frogs have darker marks and some do not. The belly is cream-white in color with gray marks. The throat is gray in color. The iris of the eye is light brown in color.

== Etymology ==
Scientists named the frog for the people who live in Guayaquil in Guayas Province.

== Habitat ==
This frog lives in Guayas, Cotopaxi, and Los Ríos in Ecuador. It lives in dry tropical forests where the trees are 20 m or shorter with many smaller plants nearby. Within these forests, the frogs are found in places where people removed some of the vegetation. Scientists believe the frog may have evolved in open areas and then retreated to the forests because of habitat loss as humans changed Ecuador's open flooded grasslands. Scientists have seen the frog between 15 and 300 m (49 and 984 ft) above sea level..

Scientists have reported the frog in protected places: Reserva Cerro Masvale, Reserva Ecológica Andrade Jauneche, and Reserva Ecológica Manglares Churute.

== Young ==
The male frogs float on the water and call to the female frogs. These animals have young in flooded rice fields and pools of water that are not deeper than 20 cm. The females deposit their eggs in foam nests that float on the water.

== Threats ==
The IUCN classifies this species as vulnerable to extinction. The threats it faces include logging and habitat loss in favor of agriculture and cattle grazing and through desertification and erosion. Scientists believe pesticide may also harm these frogs.

== Original description ==
- Ron, S.R.; Coloma, L.A.; Cannatella, D.C. (2005). "A new, cryptic species ofPhysalaemus(Anura: Leptodactylidae) from western Ecuador with comments on the call structure of theP. pustulosusspecies group". Herpetologica: 178–198.
