= List of national parks of Ecuador =

This is a list of national parks in Ecuador.

== National parks ==
There are 11 national parks:

Name	Photo	Location	Area	Established
Cayambe-Coca		Imbabura, Pichincha, Sucumbíos and Napo Province	403,103 ha (1,556 sq mi)	1970
Cotopaxi		Cotopaxi, Napo, and Pichincha Province	33,393 ha (129 sq mi)	1975
El Cajas		Azuay Province	28,540 ha (110 sq mi)	1996
Galápagos		Galápagos Province	799,540 ha (3,087 sq mi)	1959
Llanganates		Cotopaxi, Napo, Pastaza and Tungurahua Province	219,707 ha (848 sq mi)	1996
Machalilla		Manabí Province	75,059 ha (290 sq mi)	1979
Podocarpus		Loja and Zamora-Chinchipe Province	146,280 ha (565 sq mi)	1982
Sangay		Morona Santiago, Chimborazo and Tungurahua Province	517,765 ha (1,999 sq mi)	1979
Sumaco Napo-Galeras		Napo, Orellana and Sucumbíos Province	206,749 ha (798 sq mi)	1994
Yacurí		Zamora Chinchipe and Loja Province	43,100 ha (166 sq mi)	2009
Yasuní		Napo and Pastaza Province	982,300 ha (3,793 sq mi)	1979

== National Reserves ==
=== Ecological reserves ===
There are 9 national ecological reserves:

- Arenillas Ecological Reserve
- Manglares Churute Ecological Reserve
- Antisana Ecological Reserve
- Cotacachi Cayapas Ecological Reserve
- El Angel Ecological Reserve
- Illinizas Ecological Reserve
- Manglares Cayapas Mataje Ecological Reserve
- Cofán-Bemejo Ecological Reserve
- Mache-Chindul Ecological Reserve

=== Biological reserves ===
There are 4 National biological reserves:

- Cerro Plateado (Silver Hill) Biological Reserve
- El Quimi Biological Reserve
- El Cóndor Biological Reserve
- Limoncocha National Biological Reserve

=== Geobotanical reserve ===
There is one National geobotanical reserve:

- Pululahua Geobotanical Reserve

=== Wildlife refuges ===
There are 10 National wildlife refuges:

- Pasochoa Wildlife Refuges
- Isla Santa Clara Wildlife Refuges
- Isla Corazón y Fragata Wildlife Refuges
- La Chiquita Wildlife Refuges
- El Zarza Wildlife Refuges
- El Pambilar Wildlife Refuges
- Pacoche Wildlife Refuges
- El Morro Swamps Wildlife Refuges
- Rio Muisne Estuary Swampland Wildlife Refuges
- Rio Esmereldas Estuary Swampland Wildlife Refuges

=== Private Reserves ===
In addition to the many National reserves, refuges and parks in Ecuador there are some privately owned and operated reserves and refuges not listed on this page which is exclusively National Parks and other National Ecological Assets.
