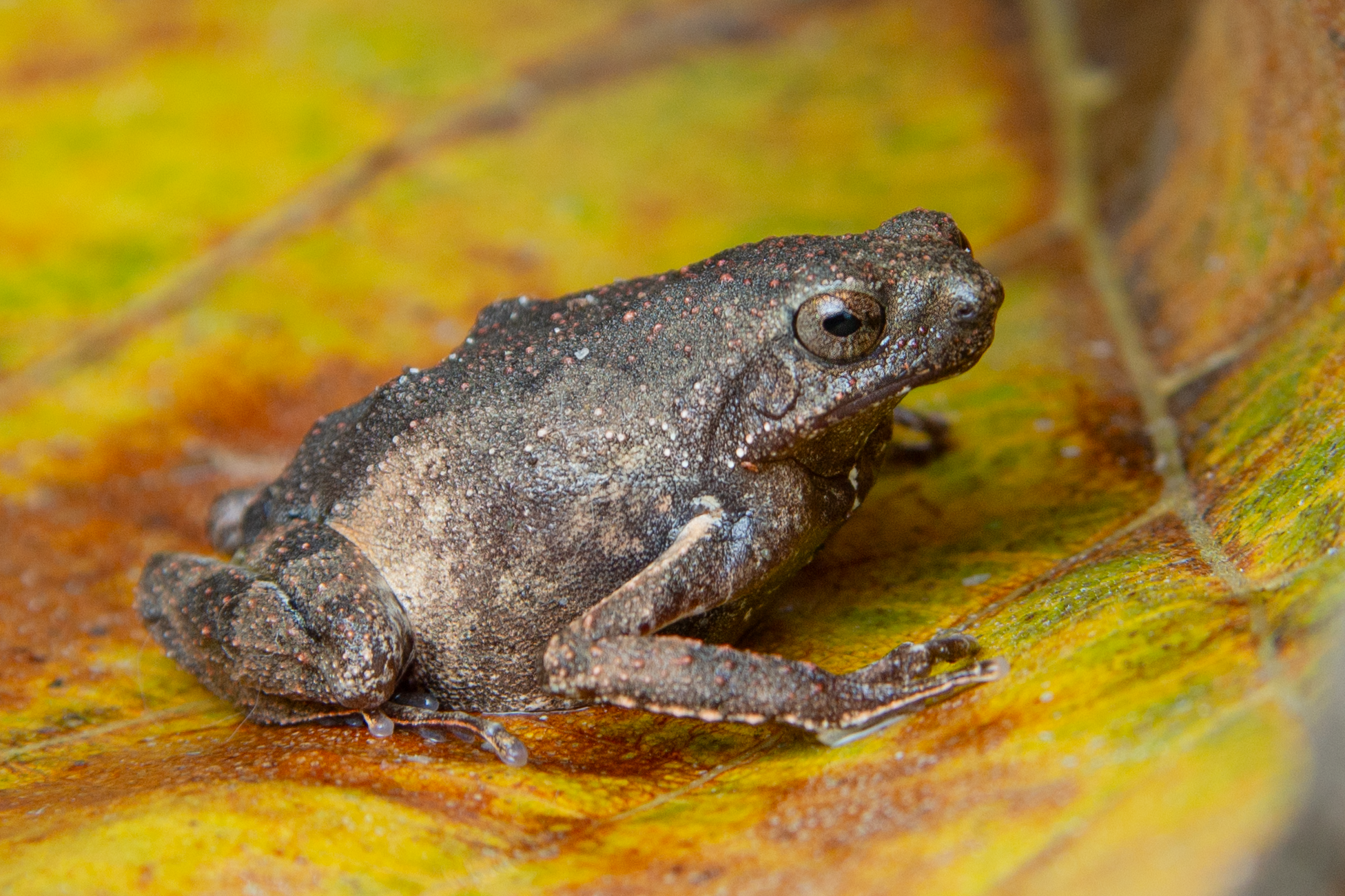

Conservation status
- Least Concern (IUCN 3.1)

Scientific classification
- Kingdom: Animalia
- Phylum: Chordata
- Class: Amphibia
- Order: Anura
- Family: Leptodactylidae
- Genus: Engystomops
- Species: E. freibergi

Binomial name
- Engystomops freibergi (Donoso-Barros, 1969)

Synonyms
- Eupemphix freibergi Donoso-Barros, 1969; Physalaemus freibergi (Donoso-Barros, 1969)

= Engystomops freibergi =

Species of amphibian

Freiberg's forest toadlet (Engystomops freibergi) is a frog native to the Amazonian Brazil, southeastern Peru, and Amazonian Bolivia. For a while, it was considered to be a synonym of Engystomops petersi, its sibling species, but its species status was resurrected in a study published in 1998. Nevertheless, these two species have also been mixed in later studies, and there are records from the Guianas that have not yet been allocated to either species. Divergence of these two species seems to have been driven by behavioural isolation related to male call characteristics more than geographic isolation.

== Description ==
Engystomops freibergi are relatively small frogs. Males measure 24–36 mm (0.94–1.42 in) in snout–vent length and females 25–39 mm (0.98–1.54 in). Dorsal colouration is variable. Skin on dorsum is warty, bearing small tubercles with scattered larger tubercles.

== Habitat ==
Engystomops freibergi is a locally common species found in lowland Amazon rainforest. These frogs are nocturnal and usually found in the leaf litter in primary forest. They feed primarily on termites.

Scientists have reported the frogs in protected places Tambopata National Reserve, Manu National Park, Floresta Nacional do Trairão, and Reserva Extrativista Riozinho da Liberdade.

== Reproduction ==
The breeding period coincides with the rainy season (December–March). Males call at night near temporary ponds and slow-moving streams. The call consists of a prefix and a "whine" component, and in some populations, a third "squawk" component. Foam nests are deposited on the surface of ponds.
