= Edalorhina nasuta =

Conservation status
- Data Deficient (IUCN 3.1)

Scientific classification
- Kingdom: Animalia
- Phylum: Chordata
- Class: Amphibia
- Order: Anura
- Family: Leptodactylidae
- Genus: Edalorhina
- Species: E. nasuta

Binomial name
- Edalorhina nasuta Boulenger, 1912

Species of frog

Edalorhina nasuta (common snouted frog) is a species of frog in the family Leptodactylidae. It is endemic to Peru.

== Description ==
The adult frog measures 32 - 38 mm in snout-vent length. It has a cryptic appearance, resembling a leaf to the human eye. Its skin is brown with warty bumps in the shape of an X and a protuberance on the nose. The hind feet have some webbed skin.

== Etymology ==
Scientists named the frog nasula, which means "long-nosed" in Latin.

== Habitat ==
This terrestrial frog is found on the leaf litter in forests. Scientists have seen the frog between 220 and 1,000 m (720 and 3,280 ft) above sea level.

Scientists have not seen the frogs in any protected areas, but they believe it might live in Yanachaga-Chemillén National Park or El Sira Communal Reserve.

== Reproduction ==
Scientists believe this frog lays eggs in foam nests.

== Threats ==
The IUCN classifies this species as data deficient. Some of the frogs may be in danger from habitat loss associated with agriculture, particularly coffee plantations.
