= Engystomops puyango =

Conservation status
- Least Concern (IUCN 3.1)

Scientific classification
- Kingdom: Animalia
- Phylum: Chordata
- Class: Amphibia
- Order: Anura
- Family: Leptodactylidae
- Genus: Engystomops
- Species: E. puyango

Binomial name
- Engystomops puyango Ron, Toral, Rivera, and Terán-Valdez, 2010

Species of frog

Engystomops puyango, the Puyango bully foam frog, Puyango dwarf frog, or sapito bullanguero de Puyango, is a species of frog in the family Leptodactylidae. It is found in Ecuador.

== Description ==
The adult male frog measures 23.78–30.48 mm (0.936–1.200 in) in snout-vent length and the adult female frog 25.41–32.68 mm (1.000–1.287 in). The skin of the dorsum is gray-brown in color with darker marks. There is a cream-white mark under each eye. The flanks are gray in color. Parts of the belly are cream-pink in color and others have gray marks. The iris of the eye is bronze in color.

== Etymology ==
Scientists named the frog for the type locality: Puyango Petrified Forest.

== Habitat ==
This frog is found in dry forests. Scientists have seen the frog between 320 and 1,291 m (1,050 and 4,240 ft) above sea level.

Scientists have reported the frogs in protected places: Puyango Protected Forest and Reserva Natural Lapiuna.

== Reproduction ==
The male frogs float on the water and call to the female frogs. The frogs deposit their eggs in floating foam nests. The male frog beats foam into bubbles during amplexus.

== Threats ==
The IUCN classifies this species as least concern of extinction. These frogs have a relatively small range but enjoy high populations within it. In some areas, the frogs may be in some danger from deforestation associated with agriculture and livestock cultivation. The frog has shown some tolerance to habitat disturbance. It has even been seen in the heavily polluted Puyango River.
