= List of World Heritage Sites in Ecuador =

World Heritage Sites in Ecuador. The green dots indicate the Qhapaq Ñan sites, 24 in total. The Galápagos Islands, located 1,000 km (620 mi) west off the mainland, are not shown on the map.

The United Nations Educational, Scientific and Cultural Organization (UNESCO) World Heritage Sites are places of importance to cultural or natural heritage as described in the UNESCO World Heritage Convention, established in 1972. Cultural heritage consists of monuments (such as architectural works, monumental sculptures, or inscriptions), groups of buildings, and sites (including archaeological sites). Natural features (consisting of physical and biological formations), geological and physiographical formations (including habitats of threatened species of animals and plants), and natural sites which are important from the point of view of science, conservation or natural beauty, are defined as natural heritage.

Ecuador accepted the convention on 16 June 1975, making its historical sites eligible for inclusion on the list. Ecuador has five sites on the list and a further six on the tentative list. The first two sites listed in Ecuador were the Galápagos Islands and the city of Quito, in 1978, which were also the first two sites inscribed to the list itself, with the reference numbers 1 and 2, respectively. Three sites are listed for their cultural and two for their natural properties. One site is transnational: the Qhapaq Ñan, Andean Road System is shared with five other countries. Ecuador has served as a member of the World Heritage Committee twice: 1976–1980 and 1995–2001.

== World Heritage Sites ==
UNESCO lists sites under ten criteria; each entry must meet at least one of the criteria. Criteria i through vi are cultural, and vii through x are natural.

* Transnational site

World Heritage Sites
Site	Image	Location (province)	Year listed	UNESCO data	Description
Galápagos Islands	Panorama with volcanic island and surrounding seas	Galápagos	1978	1bis; vii, viii, ix, x (natural)	The archipelago has 19 volcanic islands (Bartolomé Island pictured) around 1,000 km (620 mi) off the coast of South America in the Pacific Ocean. Due to their extreme isolation, and at the same time at the confluence of three ocean currents, the islands have developed unique flora and fauna. The animals include the marine iguana, Galápagos tortoise, Galápagos penguin, and numerous species of finches. The unusual animals inspired Charles Darwin, who visited the islands in 1835, to develop his theory of evolution. Volcanic processes are constantly reshaping the islands. A sigfinicant boundary modification took place in 2001.
City of Quito	A church with two bell towers and a staircase leading to the entrance in dark stone	Pichincha	1978	2; ii, iv (cultural)	Quito was founded by the Spanish in 1534 on the ruins of an Inca settlement. The colonial-era city centre is the best preserved and least altered in Latin America. Architecturally, the buildings were constructed in a mixture of European and indigenous styles, adjusted to the harsh environment in the Andes at an elevation of 2,818 m (9,245 ft). The Baroque Quito School produced numerous churches, including the Basilica and Convent of San Francisco (pictured), Church of La Compañía, and Church of Santo Domingo, together with the interior artworks.
Sangay National Park	Snow-covered volcanic peak above green forests	Chimborazo, Morona-Santiago, Tungurahua	1983	260; vii, viii, ix, x (natural)	The national park includes several different ecosystems, spanning from tropical rainforests at lower elevations to glaciers high in the mountains, together with cloud forests, grasslands, and wetlands. Active stratovolcanos Sangay (one of the world's most active volcanoes, pictured) and Tungurahua are constantly reshaping the landscape. The area is remote and home to numerous endemic animal and plant species. Important species that live in the park include the endangered mountain tapir, South American tapir, Andean condor, giant anteater, and jaguar.
Historic Centre of Santa Ana de los Ríos de Cuenca	A church building with three towers with domes	Azuay	1999	863; ii, iv, v (cultural)	The city was founded by the Spanish in 1557. It served as a melting pot between the Spanish and indigenous populations. The original grid plan, based on the Renaissance ideas of city planning, has been preserved until today, even if most of the buildings date from later periods, in particular from the 18th century, and the 19th century, when the city was modernized. Some of the important buildings include the Old Cathedral, the New Cathedral (pictured), the Carmelite Monastery, and Santo Domingo Church.
Qhapaq Ñan, Andean Road System*	Paved path in the mountains	several sites	2014	1459; ii, iii, iv, vi (cultural)	Qhapaq Ñan is an extensive pre-Incan and Incan road system, spanning over 30,000 km (19,000 mi) across the Andes. The roads connect high mountain peaks with rainforests, coasts, valleys, and deserts. The road system formed the lifeline of the Inca Empire, allowing transport and exchange of goods, as well as movements of messengers, travelers, and even armies. UNESCO lists 273 components featuring structures such as roads, bridges, ditches, and supporting infrastructure, 23 of which are in Ecuador. The site is shared with Argentina (a section pictured), Bolivia, Chile, Colombia, and Peru.

== Tentative list ==
In addition to sites inscribed on the World Heritage List, member states can maintain a list of tentative sites that they may consider for nomination. Nominations for the World Heritage List are only accepted if the site was previously listed on the tentative list. Ecuador has six properties on its tentative list.

World Heritage Sites
Site	Image	Location (province)	Year listed	UNESCO criteria	Description
Machalilla National Park	Laguna surrounded by palms and other trees	Manabí	1998	(mixed)	The national park is located on the coast of Ecuador. Large parts are covered by dry tropical forest. There are also several archaeological sites in the area, related to the pre-Columbian Machalilla culture.
Puyango Petrified Forest	Pieces of petrified wood	El Oro, Loja	1998	viii, ix (natural)	The fossils in the area date to 70 million years ago (late Cretaceous period) and include petrified wood and ammonites.
Zaruma mining town	A look at the city from above along a descending path with a decorated fence	El Oro	2016	iv, v (cultural)	Gold was mined in Zaruma already in the pre-Columbian period and in the late 16th century. A move forward came in the second half of the 19th century with the introduction of modern mining technologies. The wealth generated by the mines attracted people to the area and this resulted in mixing of European and indigenous art styles. The typical houses in the city are made of wood with ornamental details. Houses also have adjacent gardens to grow food. The city plan does not follow a grid, as common in colonial-era cities, but is instead influenced by the mountainous topography.
Cultural Itinerary of Ecuador's Trans-Andean Train	A tourist train passing through a city	Chimborazo, Guayas	2016	ii, iv, v (cultural)	The narrow-gauge railway was built between 1873 and 1908 to connect the highland and coastal regions of the country, from Guayaquil to Quito. The work was challenging because of difficult terrain, with the steepest parts of the Alausí (pictured) to Bucay section, called the Devil's Nose, reaching a 5.5% gradient. The railway brought development to the region. After not operating for several decades, the government decided in 2007 to refurbish the line.
Mayo Chinchipe - Marañón archaeological landscape	Archaeological site under a modern cover structure and an information board	Zamora-Chinchipe	2016	iii, v (cultural)	The Mayo-Chinchipe culture existed from 5500 BCE to 1700 BCE in the highlands of Ecuador, in the upper Amazon region. Based on the archaeological findings, they traded with the coastal Valdivia culture and imported items such as sea shells. In turn, they brought manioc and cacao to the coast, and it is likely they were the first to domesticate cacao. The best explored site of the culture is Santa Ana (La Florida) (pictured), where stoneware, ceramics, and ceremonial fireplaces have been discovered.
Galápagos Islands (extension)		Galápagos	2026	ix, x (natural)	This proposed extension includes the Hermandad Marine Reserve, which connects the Galápagos Islands with Cocos Island. Established in 2022, this reserve covers important migratory routes for tuna, sharks, turtles, and cetaceans, among other species, and forms part of the broader Tropical Eastern Pacific Marine Conservation Corridor. It also features a highly diverse marine ecosystem, including numerous endemic species.
