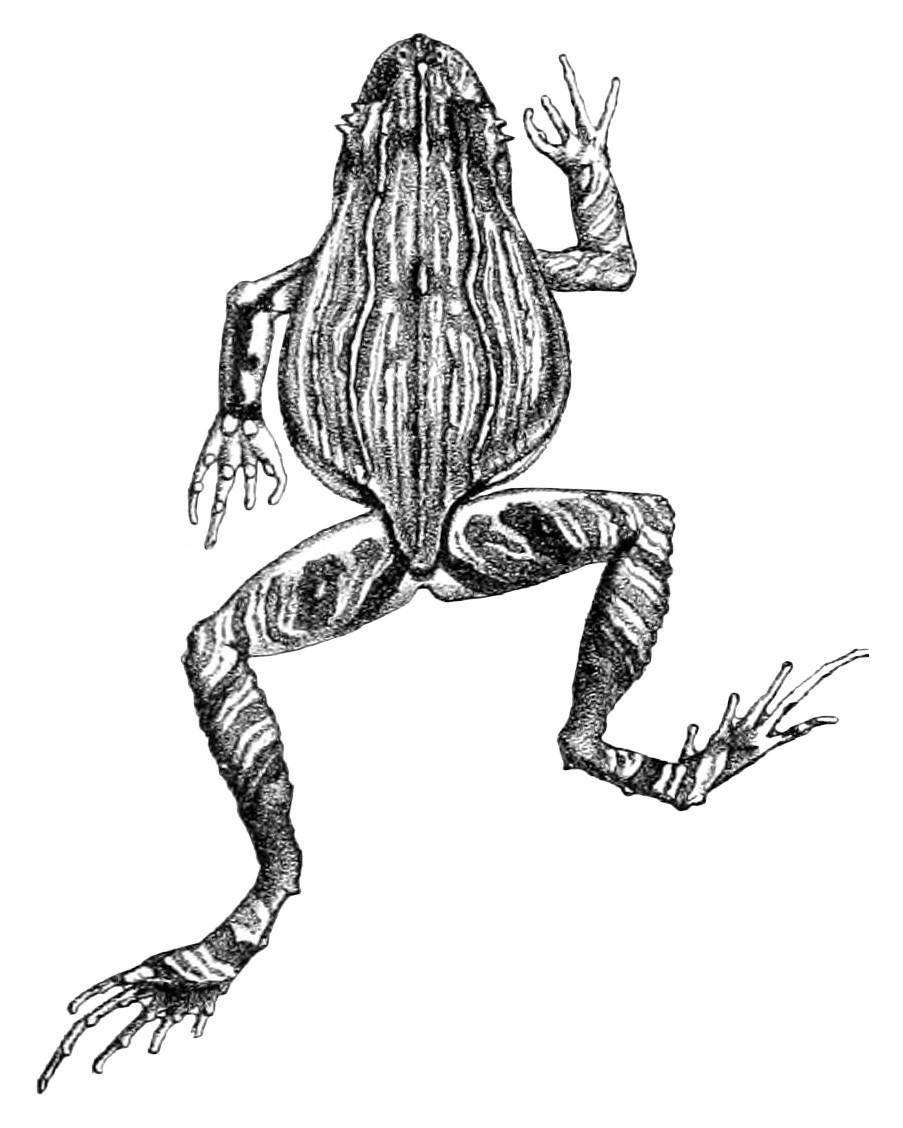
- Edalorhina perezi

Scientific classification
- Kingdom: Animalia
- Phylum: Chordata
- Class: Amphibia
- Order: Anura
- Family: Leptodactylidae
- Subfamily: Leiuperinae
- Genus: Edalorhina; Jiménez de la Espada, 1870

Type species
- Edalorhina perezi Jiménez de la Espada, 1870

Diversity
- 2 species (see text)

= Edalorhina =

Genus of amphibians

Edalorhina is a small genus of leptodactylid frogs. They are found in Colombia, Ecuador, Peru, and western Brazil. They are sometimes known as the snouted frogs.

== Species ==
The genus contains only the following two species:

- Edalorhina nasuta Boulenger, 1912
- Edalorhina perezi Jiménez de la Espada, 1870
