= Engystomops pustulatus =

Conservation status
- Least Concern (IUCN 3.1)

Scientific classification
- Kingdom: Animalia
- Phylum: Chordata
- Class: Amphibia
- Order: Anura
- Family: Leptodactylidae
- Genus: Engystomops
- Species: E. pustulatus

Binomial name
- Engystomops pustulatus (Shreve, 1941)

Synonyms
- Edalorhina pustulata Shreve, 1941; Physalaemus pustulatus (Shreve, 1941)

Species of amphibian

Engystomops pustulatus (common name: Guayaquil dwarf frog) is a species of frog in the family Leptodactylidae. It is known with certainty from western Ecuador, whereas the status of Peruvian records is ambiguous as they may refer to an undescribed species or possibly Engystomops puyango. Nevertheless, given that E. pustulatus is now known from Huaquillas in southern Ecuador, near the Peruvian border, it is likely to be found in Peru too.

== Description ==
Adult males measure 25–30 mm (1.0–1.2 in) and adult females 25–36 mm (1.0–1.4 in) in snout–vent length. The snout is rounded. The tympanum is visible and round. Maxillary and premaxillary teeth are present. The fingers have no webbing nor expanded discs. The dorsum is strongly tubercular, with enlarged and somewhat elongated tubercles forming a "ʌ" pattern in the scapular region. The belly is smooth. There is an elongated row of glands on the flank.

== Habitat and ecology ==
Engystomops pustulatus inhabits scrub savanna, Pacific tropical forests, and equatorial dry forests at elevations up to 530 m (1,740 ft) above sea level. It can also be found in human-modified habitats. It is an explosive breeder that lays the eggs in foam nests in temporary pools. Juveniles feed primarily on small food items such as termites and ants. Adults prey upon larger items, such as snails, coleopterans, and isopods.

== Conservation ==
Engystomops pustulatus can be abundant during reproductive events. Though an adaptable species, it is potentially threatened by habitat loss. It is present in the Machalilla National Park.
