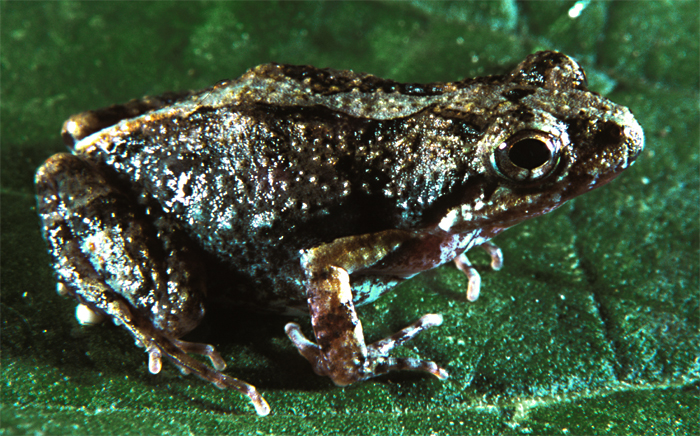

Conservation status
- Least Concern (IUCN 3.1)

Scientific classification
- Kingdom: Animalia
- Phylum: Chordata
- Class: Amphibia
- Order: Anura
- Family: Leptodactylidae
- Genus: Engystomops
- Species: E. montubio

Binomial name
- Engystomops montubio (Ron, Cannatella & Coloma, 2004)

Synonyms
- Physalaemus montubio Ron, Cannatella & Coloma, 2004

= Engystomops montubio =

Species of frog

Engystomops montubio is a species of frog in the family Leptodactylidae. It is endemic to western Ecuador.

== Description ==
The adult male frog measures 17.8–22.8 mm (0.70–0.90 in) in snout-vent length and the adult female frog 17.65–19.71 mm (0.695–0.776 in). Its upper lip is white in color. The skin of the dorsum is light brown in color with darker marks on the flanks. The belly is light in color with some brown marks. The iris of the eye is bronze in color. Sometimes there is a dark brown line behind each eye.

== Etymology ==
Scientists named the frog for the Montubio, a human ethnic group who live in some of the same places as the frog.

== Habitat ==
This frog lives in coastal forests and scrubland. People also see them in human-modified habitats, such as pastures. Scientists have seen it between 0 and 1,115 m (0 and 3,658 ft) above sea level..

Scientists have seen the frogs in protected places, such as Parque Nacional Machalilla and Refugio de Vida Silvestre Isla Corazón y Fragatas.

== Reproduction ==
These frogs have young in stream-associated pools. Scientists believe this species breeds through larval development.

== Threats ==
The IUCN classifies this species as least concern of dying out.

== Original description ==
- Ron, S.R.; Cannatella, D.C.; Coloma, L.A. (2004). "Two new species of Physalaemus (Anura: Leptodactylidae) from western Ecuador". Herpetologica (Abstract): 261–275. doi:10.1655/03-14.
