= Arenillas Ecological Reserve =

Protected area in Ecuador

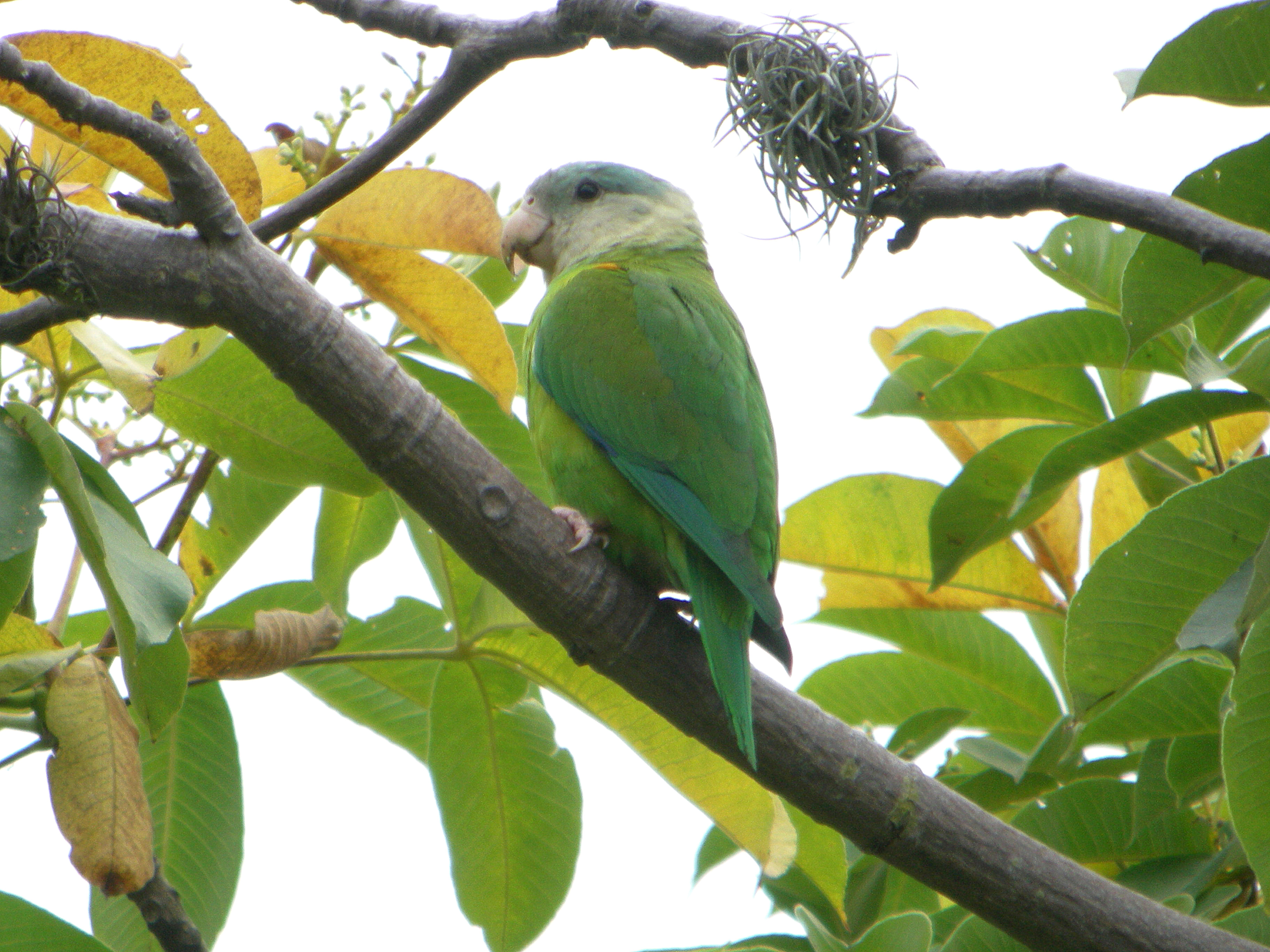
- Grey-cheeked parakeet

- Location within Ecuador
- Location: Arenillas and Huaquillas Cantons, El Oro Province, Ecuador
- Coordinates: 3.539°S 80.146°W
- Area: 17,083 ha (42,210 acres)
- Established: June 2001
- Governing body: Defense Ministry of Ecuador
- Website: www.ambiente.gob.ec?q=node%2F76

Arenillas Ecological Reserve (Spanish: Reserva Ecológica Arenillas) is a 17,083-hectare (42,210-acre) protected area in Ecuador situated in the El Oro Province, in the Arenillas Canton and in the Huaquillas Canton.

Known mammals in the reserve, according to a 1993 study include the Sechuran fox (Lycalopex sechurae), the nine-banded armadillo (Dasypus novemcinctus), Robinson's mouse opossum (Marmosa robinsoni), the Pacific spiny-rat (Proechimys decumamus), the jaguarundi (Puma yagouaroundi), the tayra (Eira barbara), the greater bulldog bat, the common vampire bat (Desmodus rotundus), the crab-eating raccoon (Procyon cancrivorus) and the Guayaquil squirrel (Sciurus stramineus). There are also 153 species of birds of which 35% are endemic. The reserve is a BirdLife International IBA with the following endangered birds: grey-cheeked parakeet (Brotogeris pyrrhoptera), slaty becard (Pachyramphus spodiurus), and blackish-headed spinetail (Synallaxis tithys).

The region is managed by the ministry of defense and visitors must get permission from them to visit the area.
