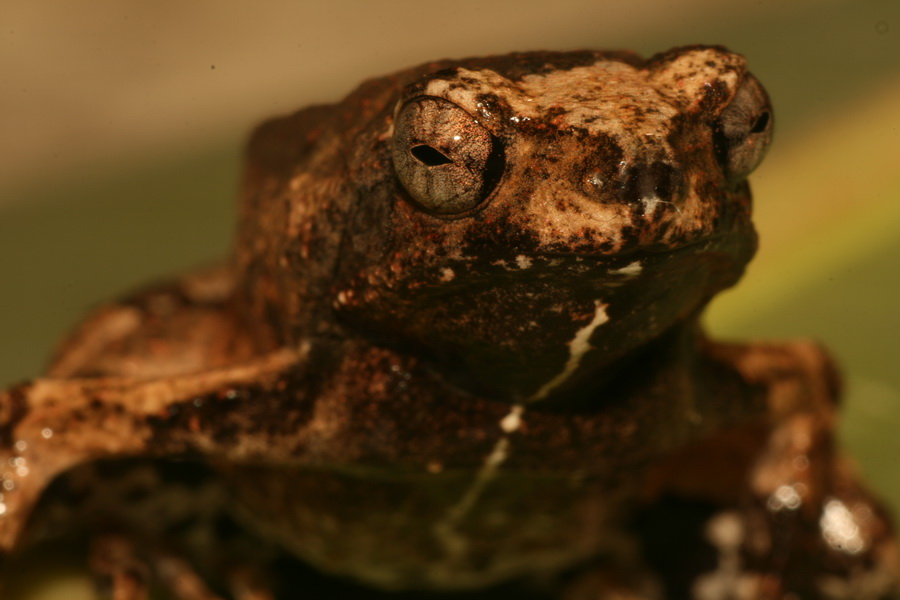

Conservation status
- Least Concern (IUCN 3.1)

Scientific classification
- Kingdom: Animalia
- Phylum: Chordata
- Class: Amphibia
- Order: Anura
- Family: Leptodactylidae
- Genus: Engystomops
- Species: E. petersi

Binomial name
- Engystomops petersi Jiménez de la Espada, 1872

Synonyms
- Physalaemus petersi (Jiménez de la Espada, 1872); Eupemphix paraensis Müller, 1923; Eupemphix schereri Myers, 1942

= Engystomops petersi =

Species of amphibian

Engystomops petersi (common name: Peters' dwarf frog) is a species of frog in the family Leptodactylidae. It is found in Amazonian Colombia, Ecuador, and Peru. It is morphologically similar to its sibling species, Engystomops freibergi, and for a period the latter was considered to be a junior synonym of Engystomops petersi. Taxonomy and classification of this species is constantly changing due to the continual evolution of behavioral isolation and rapid speciation in the region. There are also records from the Guianas that have not yet been allocated to either species. Divergence of these two species seems to have been driven by behavioural isolation related to male call characteristics more than geographic isolation.

== Taxonomy ==
The genus Engystomops is part of the family Leptodactylid. Previously, the genus Engystomops was grouped in with other Amazonian genera like Eupemphix and Physalaemus. These names are routinely exchanged making it hard to characterize differences among different species. Previously, Eupemphix paraensis, Eupemphix schereri, and Engystomops petersi were considered to be distinct species, however morphological analyses of these frogs revealed that they were conspecifics and synonymous species.

== Description ==
Engystomops petersi are relatively small frogs. Males measure 21–31 mm (0.83–1.22 in) in snout–vent length and females 25–39 mm (0.98–1.54 in). Dorsal colouration is variable. Skin on the dorsum is warty, bearing small tubercles with scattered larger tubercles. This species lacks maxillary and premaxillary teeth. E. petersi also has terminal phalanges that are T-shaped and two salivary glands known as parotoid glands that are generally visible. The hands and feet of E. petersi are characterized by bulbous fingers in which the first finger is greater in length compared to the second finger. Their build varies from slender to stocky. They are also distinct from other similar frogs in that some females have concealed eardrums or tympani and males have prominent tympani.

=== Larval morphology ===
The larval morphology of E. petersi has been thoroughly studied and compared to other members of the Engystomops genus. E. petersi larvae are generally perceived to be the largest in size of all Engystomops larvae. Its larval structure is mainly composed of the body, snout, oral disc, vent tube, tail, dorsal fin, ventral fin, and other organs. The length of the larva usually is around 22.7 mm. Its body length comprises a little less than half of its total length. It has a broad snout that is wide and round with nostrils that are slightly discolored on the outer rim. Its oral disc is filled with small papillae arranged rows with various tip lengths and shapes. The jaw has a dark coloration and is marked by serrations that follow an arc-shaped pattern. E. petersi tadpoles also have a vent tube that is attached to the ventral fin of the body. Their tails are approximately 60% of their entire body length with a narrowly rounded tip. A distinguishing characteristic of E. petersi larvae compared to other Engystomops species is the presence of prominent elliptical paravertebral glands.

The coloration of E. petersi larva has only been reported after preservation. In preservative, its coloration is mainly dark to light brown. Aspotty mesh pattern with speckles around certain regions of the body is also visible. The tail is light brown with speckles all over and the fins are translucent with threadlike markings.

== Habitat and distribution speciation ==
Engystomops petersi is a common species that inhabits primary and secondary forests and forest edges. They are terrestrial frogs often found in leaf-litter. They are nocturnal, and prefer humid environments. While they are terrestrial, they breed near water bodies, specifically on the edges of lakes, ponds, and pools. The males sing and send mating calls while floating on their backs in the water. The genus Engystomops is a lineage of frogs located in the Andean foothills of Ecuador, Peru, and Bolivia, extending to the Amazon basin in Brazil. Speciation events of the genus are well studied and typically defined using the study of mitochondrial DNA, mating calls, and cytogenetic variation among different frogs in the area. Engystomops petersi makes up the northwestern clade of the genus Engystomops and was found to be its own species located in northern Peru and Ecuador. Puyo, Ecuador is a hub for Engystomops petersi frogs and has been used for comparative karyotypic analysis with other frog species in the area. Its karyotype is unique compared to other Engystomops species in the area and specifically diverges from the southwestern clade known as E. freibergi located in southern Peru and Brazil.

=== Genetic population structure ===
Sexual selection has been thought to play a role in evolutionary speciation of Engystomops. Female E. petersi discriminate against certain mating calls from foreign populations and will recognize calls from specific locations. Such behavioral isolation of the species likely led to speciation. The genetic variation between different Engystomops species is also characterized by variations within karyotypes with different banding patterns as well as clade divergence.

== Feeding behavior ==
E. petersi diet consists exclusively of termites. This is in contrast to Engystompos pustulosus, which has a larger diet breadth compared to the specialized diet of the E. petersi. This species has been observed to feed in groups in some circumstances. In a herpetological study in Bolivia, E. petersi were observed feeding on termites in a semicircular formation. This is one of the few examples of group feeding seen in herpetofauna in the region, which tend to feed on leaf litters on the rainforest floor.

== Reproduction ==
E. petersi's breeding period coincides with the rainy season. The male call consists of a prefix and a "whine" component, and, in some populations only, a third "squawk" component. Eggs are laid in foam nests.

=== Mating calls and female choice ===
E. petersi females display preferential mate selection towards males with conspecific calls. The characteristic call of E. petersi consists of two parts. The first part of the advertisement call is known as the prefix. The prefix consists of one or two short bursts of sound at a frequency of about 20-70 ms. The second part of the advertisement call consists of the whine. The whine is a lower-frequency sweeping call that occurs after the prefix. In certain areas E. petersi populations also add a suffix to the end of the whine that occurs at a higher frequency compared to the rest of the call. Within E. petersi populations there has also been divergence in mating call patterns in geographically isolated regions. In three geographically isolated regions in Ecuador, mating calls of E. petersi vary in frequency in different regions, serving as likely evidence for further speciation of E. petersi over time.

Female E. petersi tend to prefer local calls over foreign calls from male conspecifics. They don't tend to recognize different frequency calls. They also prefer the complex calls that include a suffix at the end compared to the simpler calls with a prefix and whine only. The strong preference for local males serves as evidence of behavioral isolation in this species. This is important for understanding genetic drift, sexual selection, and speciations in the Amazon where genetic drift is so high. The rapid speciation of E. petersi makes it a good subject for analysis of evolutionary patterns in these environments.

=== Genetic diversity ===
E. petersi are known to be in behavioral isolation. Females prefer conspecific chorus calls to calls from other species, a factor leading to their evolution of reproductive isolation. Despite this, a few instances have been found involving reproduction between heterospecifics. This has led to hybrid specification with minimal phenotypic differences between frogs in close geographic proximity. However, E. petersi has general karyotype differences among different species making fertilization and development less likely to succeed. In fact, fertilization crosses with E. magnus and E. selva lead to reduced fertilization rates and overall decrease in fertility. This has been attributed to high variation in chromosome structure, banding pattern, and length between the different species creating unstable karyotypes in future progeny.

== Conservation and threats ==
E. petersi have been used in conservation studies for the anuran population in the Andes. They are potentially threatened by the invasive species of rainbow trout that has infested the water of the Ecuadorian Andes. Rainbow trout serve as a vector for Saprolegnia diclina, which can effectively transmit this disease to E. petersi tadpoles, increasing their mortality and iltuimately contributing to the decrease of anuran populations in the area. With the increasing number of rainbow trout farms in the area, rainbow trout are a growing potential threat to nearby anuran species.

Habitat loss is also a major concern for E. petersi. The Ecuadorian forests have lost almost 60% of their habitats due to deforestation. There have also been many legal and illegal mining and logging activities that further habitat loss. This is a threat not only to E. petersi but all other biodiversity in the region. Since E. petersi is localized to a comparatively small region, such habitat loss could be especially devastating for this species.
