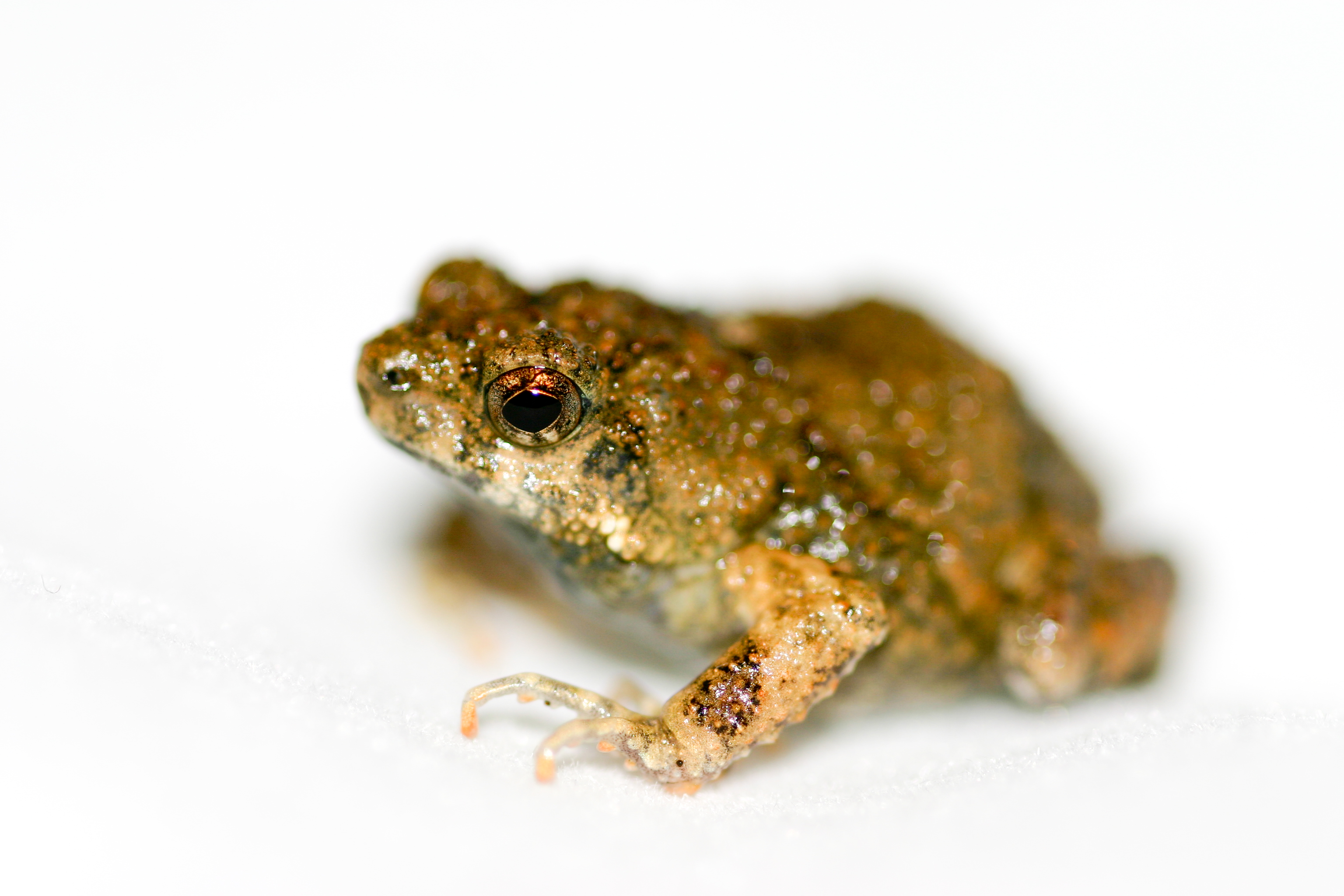

Conservation status
- Least Concern (IUCN 3.1)

Scientific classification
- Kingdom: Animalia
- Phylum: Chordata
- Class: Amphibia
- Order: Anura
- Family: Leptodactylidae
- Genus: Engystomops
- Species: E. pustulosus

Binomial name
- Engystomops pustulosus (Cope, 1864)

Synonyms
- Physalaemus pustulosus (Cope, 1864)

= Túngara frog =

Species of amphibian

The túngara frog (Engystomops pustulosus) is a species of frog in the family Leptodactylidae. It is a small nocturnal terrestrial frog found in Mexico, Central America, and the northeastern regions of South America.

The túngara frog exhibits unique behavior in male/female interactions. Male vocalizations are critical in female mate choice, and females often prefer males who give complex mating calls at a lower frequency rather than simple calls at a higher frequency. This long distance vocalization is the primary mating behavior of túngara frogs, and it is produced by a fibrous mass in the frog's larynx. The túngara frog may also have a mutualistic relationship with tarantulas, where tarantulas participate in predator defense while frogs protect tarantula eggs. Túngara frogs have distinct coloration which helps defend them from predators.

== Description ==
Engystomops pustulosus is a small species of terrestrial frog growing to a length of between 25 and 35 mm (1.0 and 1.4 in). The tympanum is not visible and the dorsum is covered in small warts. These warts resulted in other early descriptions falsely identifying túngara frogs as a species of toad in the Bufo genus. The eyes are relatively large and protruding. Males have large, dark vocal sacs that expand when calling for females. Both males and females typically have a conspicuous white stripe that extends from the lower lip to down the throat.

=== Plasticity ===
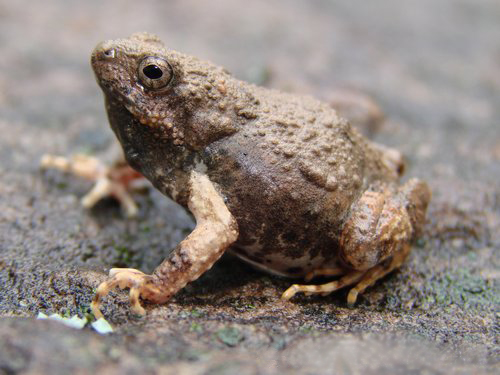
Engystomops pustulosus

In order to protect themselves from predators, they develop protective coloration depending on the region of the habitat. Túngara frogs have two distinct color patterns: unstriped pattern and striped pattern. The frequency of color patterns differs along the urbanization gradient of the region. Increased urbanization has affected anti-predator coloration of túngara frogs, especially leading to increase of striped individuals. Striped frogs are more abundant in urban areas than in forest areas. Specifically, striped frogs are more likely to be abundant in areas than forest areas where avian predation is prevalent. In addition, frogs in forest areas have lower numbers of attacks by birds compared to frogs in urban areas, but predation rates are similar for unstriped and striped frogs. The research also suggests the factors other than urbanization should be considered in understanding the change of coloration dynamics in region, such as different predator communities and predation pressure. The protective coloration will continuously change its frequency and pattern depending on the various factors.

== Habitat and distribution ==
It is found from Mexico and throughout Central America and into northern South America as far east as Trinidad and Tobago, Venezuela, and possibly Guyana. Its natural habitats are lowland savannas and open environments, as well as natural and disturbed humid lowland and montane forest, tropical dry forest. It has an affinity for human-made bodies of water and can often be found near temporary or permanent ponds, puddles, ditches, and potholes. It has been found in suburban areas and in many protected parks throughout its range.

== Ecology ==
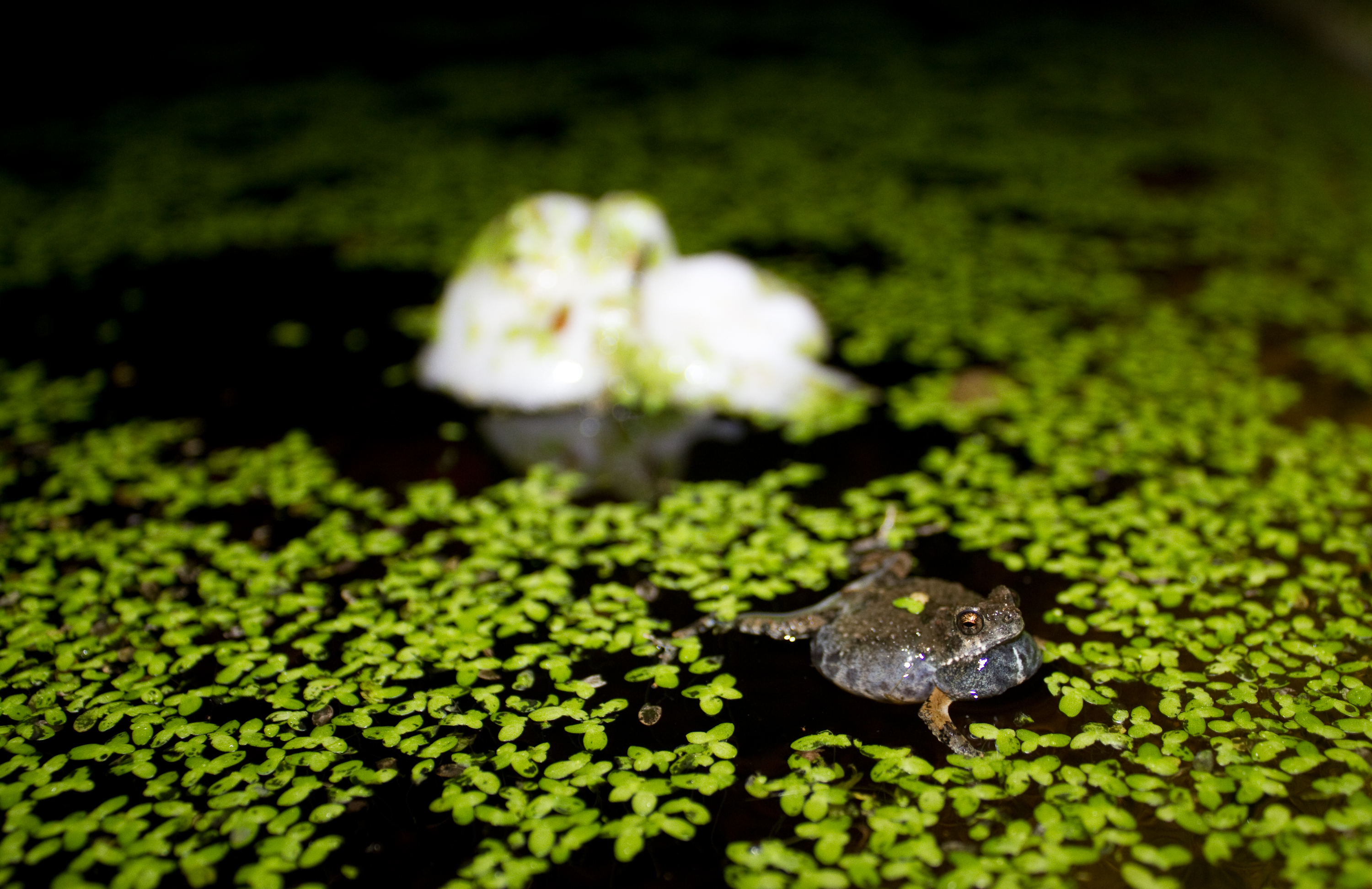
Engystomops pustulosus swimming

Engystomops pustulosus is nocturnal, emerging at night to feed on ants and termites and other small invertebrates (such as snails, beetles, flies and isopods) among the plant litter on the ground. Some of the main predators of túngara frogs include bats (Trachops cirrhosus), frog (Leptodactylus pentadactylus), opossum (Philander opossum), and crab (Potamocarcinus richmondia).

It has been reported that the frog may have a mutualistic relationship with tarantulas of the genus Aphonopelma in Mexico. As observed in microhylid frog Chiasmocleis ventrimaculata and tarantula Xenesthis immanis, the spider may protect the frog from predators while the frog protects the spider's eggs from ants, an interaction that may occur with other microhylids as well as the túngara frog, which is a leptodactyloid.

== Reproduction ==
During the breeding season, the males group together at night in temporary pools and call to attract mates. When a female chooses one of the males, amplexus occurs at the edge of the water and the male creates a foam nest in which the eggs are laid; the tadpoles develop in the water and undergo metamorphosis into juvenile frogs in about four weeks.

As male túngara frogs gather in choruses in the breeding site and call their mates, females move smoothly through the crowd of males and choose their mate through physical contact. The male clasping the female from the top, they remain in the state of amplexus for up to several hours. When mating, the male frog centers himself atop the female to do a rhythmic mixing of a foam-producing solvent released by the female to generate a floating foam nest. The nests are resistant bio-foams that protect the fertilized eggs. After about four days, the tadpoles leave and the nest degrades but otherwise can last for up to two weeks.

Female túngara frogs also exhibit elicitation behaviors that mainly serve to cause a potential mate to increase its sexual display intensity. Among all repeatable and noticeable locomotive behaviors that females exhibit, behaviors in which females clearly move closer to or farther from males are known as approach/retreat (AR) behaviors, while behaviors in which females do not move closer or farther are known as nonapproach/retreat (NAR) behaviors. Specifically, behaviors, elicitation behaviors are NAR behaviors that induce increase of number of chucks from males. Their primary role is manipulating male display, not acquiring mate. Elicitation behaviors vary with male chorus size, being more common in low density choruses than high density choruses due to its main purpose of producing more chucks. In high density choruses, increased production of chucks would not provide as much benefit than in low density choruses.

=== Mating call ===
The primary mating behavior of túngara frogs is long-distance mating call consisting of two distinct call components: 'whine' and 'chuck'. Males produce a call that consists of a whine, and can also add up to seven short chuck sounds to their mating call. A call consisting of both a whine and a chuck is considered a complex call. The chuck portion of the call is produced by vibrations of a fibrous mass suspended near the frog's larynx, with larger masses allowing production of more chucks per whine. Whine is a long, frequency-modulated sound with five harmonics, fundamental frequency sweeping from 900 Hz to 400 Hz, dominant frequency of about 700 Hz, and duration of about 300 ms. Chuck is a short, high amplitude burst of sound with 15 harmonics, fundamental frequency of about 200 Hz, dominant frequency of about 2500 Hz, 90% of its energy above 1500 Hz, and duration of about 45 ms. With these components, male túngara frogs can produce two types of calls: simple call, consisting only of whine, and complex call, consisting of whine immediately followed by up to six or seven chucks. Whine induces female phonotaxis and contributes to species recognition, while chuck increases the call's attractiveness in mating.

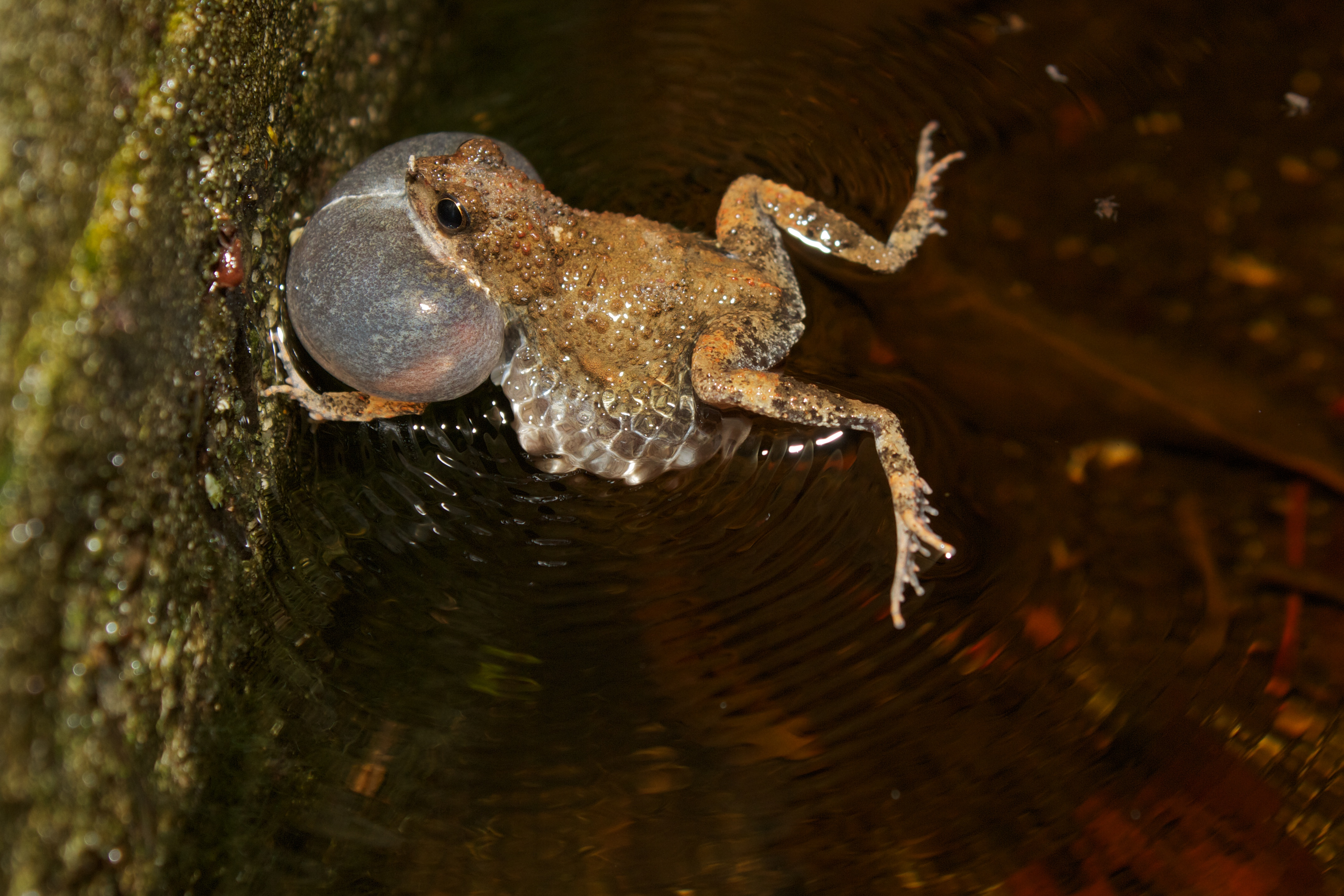
Vocal sac of Physalaemus pustulosus

The main organ responsible for producing sound in túngara frogs is larynx supported by its fibrous mass hanging from the vocal cords and projecting from the larynx into the bronchi. As the trunk muscles around the lungs contract, the expelled air pushes through the larynx and vibrates the vocal cords/folds and the larynx, producing the sound. Air enters the buccal cavity, passes through the vocal slits, and inflates the vocal sac. The inflation of vocal sac is also known to serve as a visual cue to receivers. Male túngara frogs produce chuck through their fibrous mass, and their fibrous mass is larger than other species and populations that do not produce chuck. Also, surgical excision of the fibrous mass inhibits the production of chuck despite the frog's attempt to produce complex call.

The mating calls of túngara frogs increase their risk of falling victim to predators such as fringe-lipped bats, with more complex calls increasing the ability of bats to detect the frogs. Complex calling by males, however, increases their likelihood of attracting females relative to simple calling. As such, the mating calls observed in túngara frogs have evolved as a balance between the opposing evolutionary forces of increased reproductive success from producing mating calls and a lowered chance of survival due to predation.

=== Mate choice ===
Female preferences for calls play a significant role in túngara frog mating. They favor complex calls over simple calls, low frequency chucks over high frequency chucks, and conspecific whine over heterospecific whine. Females prefer the mating call of frogs who produce chucks with lower frequencies. If a female finds a male's call attractive, she will use the call, as well as ripples in the water caused by its production, to locate her new mate.

Female choice for complex calls can be explained by the tuning of the túngara frog's inner ear organs: the amphibian papilla and the basilar papilla. The frequency that the basilar papilla is most sensitive to is 2130 Hz, and the chuck's dominant frequency is about 2500 Hz. The smaller the frequency difference between the male's chuck frequency and the tuning of the basilar papilla, the greater the neural excitation of the female. Thus, females prefer the lower frequency chucks that are closer to the tuning frequency of the basilar papilla.

Female choice for low frequency chucks comes from female's preference for larger males providing reproductive benefit. The size difference between the mates determines the fertilization rate in that decrease in the size difference leads to decrease in the number of unfertilized eggs and increase in fertilization rate. Due to the tendency of female túngara being larger than male túngara frogs, larger males lessen the size gap with females and benefit the fertilization. And since larger males have larger larynxes, they produce lower frequency of sound (chuck and whine). Consequently, strong sexual dimorphism can be observed in larynx size. Until about 16 mm snout-to-vent length, females and males have larynges of about the same size. However, above this point, males show strong positive allometric growth in larynx size until the plateau of growth at about 24 mm snout-to-vent length, around the time of the male's first call in the field. This shows that male reproductive behavior is triggered at the full development of the larynx.

Female choice for conspecific whine comes from the lack of prediction between phylogenetic similarity of the túngara frog species and acoustic similarity of their calls. Also, shared common ancestry is suggested to lead to shared auditory and neural responses. Compared to the former female choice, female choice for conspecific whine has less significance due to the lack of overlap between the habitat of túngara frogs and the habitat of other Physalaemus species, decreasing the instances of avoiding the calls of close relatives.

The phonotaxis experiment endorses the female call preference for complex calls and low frequency chucks. In terms of female choice for complex calls, the experiment is set up in a way that a female is placed equidistant between two speakers broadcasting series of test calls. In terms of female choice for low frequency chucks, the experiment is set up in a way that a female is given identical whines, but the single chuck following the whine is in either low or high frequency. The results show that females prefer whine followed by low frequency chuck. Additionally, females prefer low frequency whine to high frequency whine.

The test with reconstructed ancestral cells endorses the female call preference for conspecific whine. The results show that females give strongest response to calls of phylogenetically closest species, indicating the more significant influence of evolutionary history than acoustic similarity.

Recent research suggests that sexual calls from the males are influenced by their dietary conditions. Female frogs responded to unfed males calls less as time unfed increased.

=== Male/male interactions ===
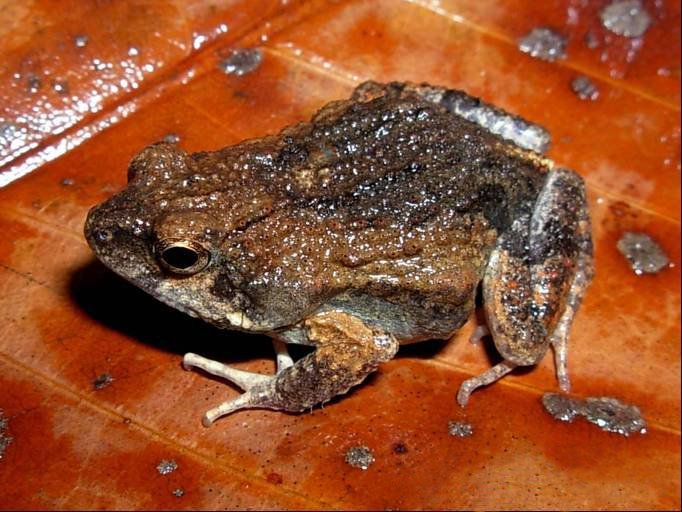
Engystomops pustulosus

Despite the benefit of satisfying the female choice and increasing mating success, complex calls also follow with a cost of increased risk of predation and parasitism because frog-eating bats, Trachops cirrhosus, and blood-sucking flies, Corethrella spp., prefer complex calls to simple calls.Like females, these predators prefer complex calls and will use them to locate and prey upon male túngara frogs; thus, males have been found to alternate between complex and simple calls depending on the situation. Males produce complex calls more often when there are other calling males nearby, forming what is known as a chorus. Males that use such calling strategies are able to maximize the possibility of finding a mate and minimize predation risk.

Therefore, the males must find a strategy that resolves the conflict between natural selection and sexual selection. While portraying a trait that increases its attractiveness, the male must also remain inconspicuous through strategic variance of call complexity. When males are alone, they produce mostly simple calls, but when they are in choruses, they increase their call complexity and produce complex calls.

Research suggests the relationship between the chorus size and the costs and benefits of frog chorusing behavior. The benefit of frog chorusing behavior is increased in larger chorus size because increase of chorus size leads to increase of operational sex ratio, probability of mating, and decrease of predation risk. While predation rate and chorus size do not have a correlation, predation risk and chorus size do have correlation. The cost of frog chorusing behavior is increased in smaller chorus size, as shown in the negative correlation between predation risk and chorus size. The tendency of acoustically orienting predators to attack choruses influences the individual's predation risk in a way that when the predator appears in the site of chorusing, the individual has a higher chance of getting attacked when there are not as many frogs in the site. The cost-benefit model of the frog chorusing behavior suggests the influence of the asymmetric benefits related to male size and behavior on the size of male túngara frogs in terms of joining the choruses.

== Conservation ==
Within the extinction risk categories assigned by the IUCN Red List, Engystomops pustulosus is listed as least concern of extinction. Although its IUCN status seems to lessen the concern of population conservation of túngara frogs, 43% of species are experiencing decline, which suggests this frog may be threatened in the near future. The major stressors of amphibian declines include the following: habitat loss/degradation, pollution, climate change, and invasive species.

Among all causes, habitat loss/degradation and pollution are known to be the most important. These causes also show cooccurrence in that intensified agricultural and urbanized landscape lead to both habitat change and increased pollutant release. However, the specific effects of these causes on amphibians, especially their health, are largely unknown.

Some research suggests the negative impact of agricultural sites on túngara frog health, displayed by decreased egg number, reduced hatching success, and undersized/smaller body size and male secondary sexual characteristics. Such findings in research significantly relates to the conservation of amphibians, since lower reproduction is likely to correlate with an accelerated population decline.
