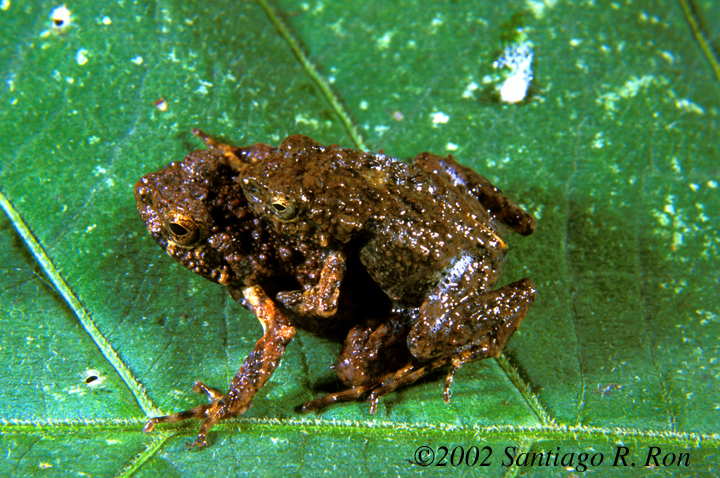

Conservation status
- Endangered (IUCN 3.1)

Scientific classification
- Kingdom: Animalia
- Phylum: Chordata
- Class: Amphibia
- Order: Anura
- Family: Leptodactylidae
- Genus: Engystomops
- Species: E. coloradorum

Binomial name
- Engystomops coloradorum (Cannatella and Duellman, 1984)

Synonyms
- Physalaemus coloradorum Cannatella and Duellman, 1984

= Engystomops coloradorum =

Species of amphibian

Engystomops coloradorum, also known as Colorado dwarf frog, is a species of frogs in the family Leptodactylidae. It is endemic to the Pacific lowlands and foothills of the Andes in the Pichincha and Santo Domingo de los Tsáchilas Provinces, Ecuador.

== Description ==
Adult males measure 18–24 mm (0.71–0.94 in) and adult females 22–26 mm (0.87–1.02 in) in snout–vent length. The snout is subacuminate. The tympanum is small, recessed, and smooth, whereas the tympanic annulus is granular. The forelimbs are slender; fingers are without webbing. The hind limbs are short and the toes have basal webbing. All dorsal surfaces have small tubercles, and there are large tubercles on head and body. The dorsum is brown and may have an orange-brown middorsal stripe posteriorly. The limbs are orange-brown; forelimbs have dark brown markings and hind limbs have dark brown to black bars. The venter is black and heavily mottled with white or bluish white, which becomes dark brown on flanks and hind limbs. The iris is pale grayish brown or dull bronze and has fine black reticulations.

== Habitat and conservation ==
Its natural habitats are tropical moist forests and more open, altered habitats at elevations of 100–1,100 m (330–3,610 ft) above sea level (AmphibiaWebEcuador puts the lower limit at 400 m). It breeds in small, still waterbodies where it makes foam nests. It can be locally abundant but its range is small. Though adaptable, it is probably threatened by habitat loss.
