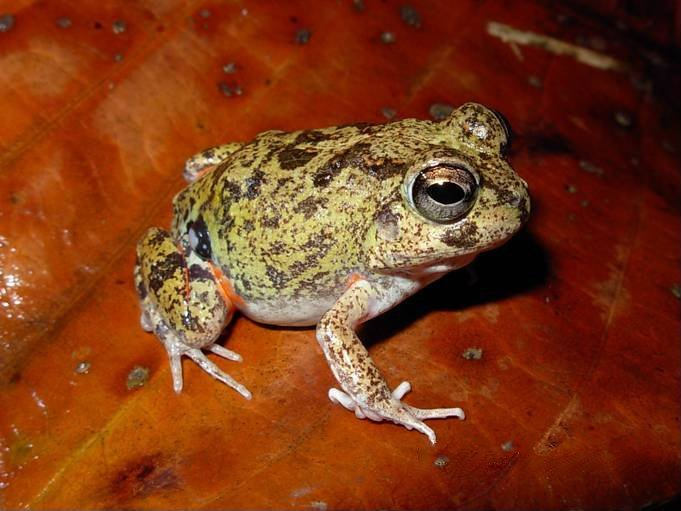
- Pleurodema brachyops

Scientific classification
- Kingdom: Animalia
- Phylum: Chordata
- Class: Amphibia
- Order: Anura
- Family: Leptodactylidae
- Subfamily: Leiuperinae; Bonaparte, 1850

Type genus
- Leiuperus Duméril and Bibron, 1841

Synonyms
- Leiuperina Bonaparte, 1850; Leiuperidae Bonaparte, 1850

= Leiuperinae =

Subfamily of amphibians

The Leiuperinae are a subfamily of frogs in the family Leptodactylidae. Over 90 species are in five genera. The distribution of this subfamily is from southern Mexico to the Central America and much of South America.

== Taxonomy ==
Recognition of the Leiuperinae as it is known today is relatively recent. Frost et al. (2006) treated the Leiuperina as a part of the Leptodactylidae, whereas Grant et al. (2006) recognized them as a family, the view adopted by some sources. However, the Amphibian Species of the World follows Pyron and Wiens (2011) in recognizing this taxon as a subfamily. However, AmphibiaWeb includes leiuperinid genera in the Leptodactylidae, without recognizing them as a subfamily.

== Genera ==
The five genera are:

- Edalorhina Jiménez de la Espada, 1870
- Engystomops Jiménez de la Espada, 1872
- Physalaemus Fitzinger, 1826
- Pleurodema Tschudi, 1838
- Pseudopaludicola Miranda-Ribeiro, 1926

== Defensive Mechanisms ==
Leiuperinae display several anti-predator mechanisms, including eyespots, hidden bright colours, macroglands in a inguinal/lumbar position, defensive behaviours, and/or chemical defence. A 2021 study showed the most recent ancestor of Edalorhina, Engystomops, Physalaemus, and Pleurodema evolved a particular type of serous gland (the main component of macroglands) in the lumbar skin along with the absence of the Eberth-Katschenko layer. Leiuperines with macroglands exhibit a defensive behaviour which includes four displays ('crouching down', rear elevation, body inflation, and eye protection) all of which are present in this same common ancestor. Several species independently evolved the two elements associated with aposematism (hidden bright colours and eyespots). Overall, the study provided phylogenetic evidence for the startle-first hypothesis, i.e. behavioural displays arise as sudden movements in camouflaged individuals to avoid predatory attacks, prior to the origin of bright coloration.
