= Limoncocha National Biological Reserve =

Nature reserve in Ecuador

- Interactive map of Limoncocha National Biological Reserve
- Location: Ecuador; Sucumbíos Province
- Coordinates: 0°24′0″S 76°36′0″W
- Area: 46.13 km^{2} (17.81 sq mi)
- Established: 1998

Limoncocha National Biological Reserve is a nature reserve is located 229 miles from Quito, Ecuador. The reserve includes over 11,000 acres (44 km^{2}) of land in the Shushufindi Canton, Sucumbíos Province.

== Fauna ==
There is a large concentration of Fauna in and around the reserve. The over 347 species of bird that live in the reserve make Birdwatching very popular attraction. Limoncocha also holds a large number of tortoises and a diverse population of fish.

== Flora ==
The park is a largely water environment so a large portion of the Flora in the Nature reserve is either aquatic or semi-aquatic in nature. As with much of Ecuador towering trees provide homes for hundreds of types of animals. The microscopic algae in the water gives it a lemon green color.

== Attractions ==
Much of the reserve is a lagoon style landscape that was formed by the ancient course of the Napo River. A small community of Quichua also live in the Reserve.

== Climate ==
Climate data for Limoncocha, elevation 219 m (719 ft), (1971–2000)
Month	Jan	Feb	Mar	Apr	May	Jun	Jul	Aug	Sep	Oct	Nov	Dec	Year
Mean daily maximum °C (°F)	29.9 (85.8)	30.2 (86.4)	29.8 (85.6)	29.4 (84.9)	29.2 (84.6)	28.7 (83.7)	28.4 (83.1)	29.6 (85.3)	30.2 (86.4)	30.4 (86.7)	30.8 (87.4)	30.6 (87.1)	29.8 (85.6)
Mean daily minimum °C (°F)	20.0 (68.0)	20.4 (68.7)	20.5 (68.9)	20.6 (69.1)	20.4 (68.7)	20.1 (68.2)	19.7 (67.5)	19.6 (67.3)	19.8 (67.6)	19.9 (67.8)	20.5 (68.9)	20.1 (68.2)	20.1 (68.2)
Average precipitation mm (inches)	244.0 (9.61)	224.0 (8.82)	292.0 (11.50)	310.0 (12.20)	299.0 (11.77)	318.0 (12.52)	262.0 (10.31)	218.0 (8.58)	240.0 (9.45)	291.0 (11.46)	273.0 (10.75)	198.0 (7.80)	3,169 (124.77)
Average relative humidity (%)	87	88	88	88	88	89	89	87	87	85	87	86	87
Source: FAO

== See also ==
List of national parks in Ecuador
