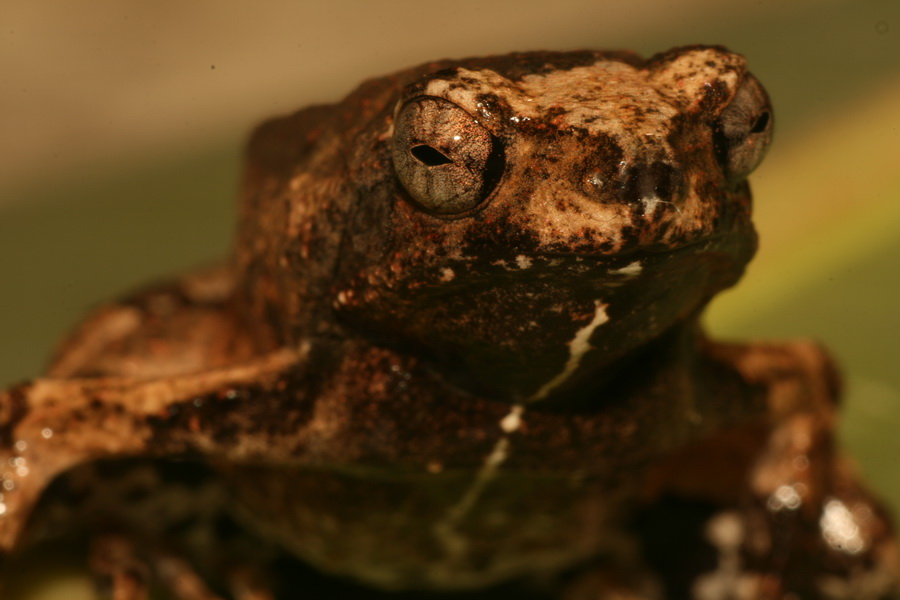
- Engystomops petersi

Scientific classification
- Domain: Eukaryota
- Kingdom: Animalia
- Phylum: Chordata
- Class: Amphibia
- Order: Anura
- Family: Leptodactylidae
- Subfamily: Leiuperinae
- Genus: Engystomops; Jiménez de la Espada, 1872

Species
- 9 (see text)

Synonyms
- Microphryne Peters, 1873

= Engystomops =

Genus of amphibians

Engystomops is a genus of frogs in the family Leptodactylidae. They are commonly known as foam frogs or túngara frogs, though the latter name most commonly refers to Engystomops pustulosus. They are native to the Americas from southern Mexico south to the Amazon Basin.

This genus was maintained on its own until 1970, when it was merged into Physalaemus, a genus of similar frogs. As studies progressed, there was increasing evidence that Physalaemus was not a monophyletic group; it was made up of several groups. One of those groups consisted of several frogs more closely related to each other than to the rest of the Physalaemus, and they were represented by P. pustulosus, now Engystomops pustulosus. This group was split off in 2005 on the basis of characters such as basic morphology and vocalizations, as well as allozyme and other genetic analysis. The group was given the revalidated name Engystomops. It included two newly described species.

== Description ==
These frogs measure about 1.5 or 1.6 to 3.5 or 3.8 centimeters long.

These frogs live on the forest floor. They breed in temporary pools, sometimes in puddles that form during the rainy season. They are perhaps best known for their foam-nest-building behavior, particularly E. pustulosus, in which the behavior has been well-studied. During mating, the male releases sperm while the female releases eggs and a protein-rich fluid. The male vigorously beats the fluid into a foam with his feet. The eggs are suspended in the foam, which acts as a protective matrix. Some of the proteins have surfactant properties, keeping the foam mass stable on the water, while others likely have antimicrobial and antiparasite properties.

Frogs of this genus have been researched in studies of sexual selection and communication in animals.

It was previously believed that a female's choice in Engystomops benefited through indirect exclusion but it is now believed that the extra male activity while nesting influences the fitness of the female directly. Thus creating the operation of sexual selection through direct benefit.

As of early 2018, there are nine species in this genus:

- Engystomops coloradorum (Cannatella and Duellman, 1984)
- Engystomops freibergi (Donoso-Barros, 1969)
- Engystomops guayaco (Ron, Coloma, and Cannatella, 2005)
- Engystomops montubio (Ron, Cannatella, and Coloma, 2004)
- Engystomops petersi Jiménez de la Espada, 1872
- Engystomops pustulatus (Shreve, 1941)
- Engystomops pustulosus (Cope, 1864)
- Engystomops puyango Ron, Toral, Rivera, and Terán-Valdez, 2010
- Engystomops randi (Ron, Cannatella, and Coloma, 2004)

It has been suggested that E. pustulosus is a cryptic species complex, and E. petersi may be, as well.
