= Puyango Petrified Forest =

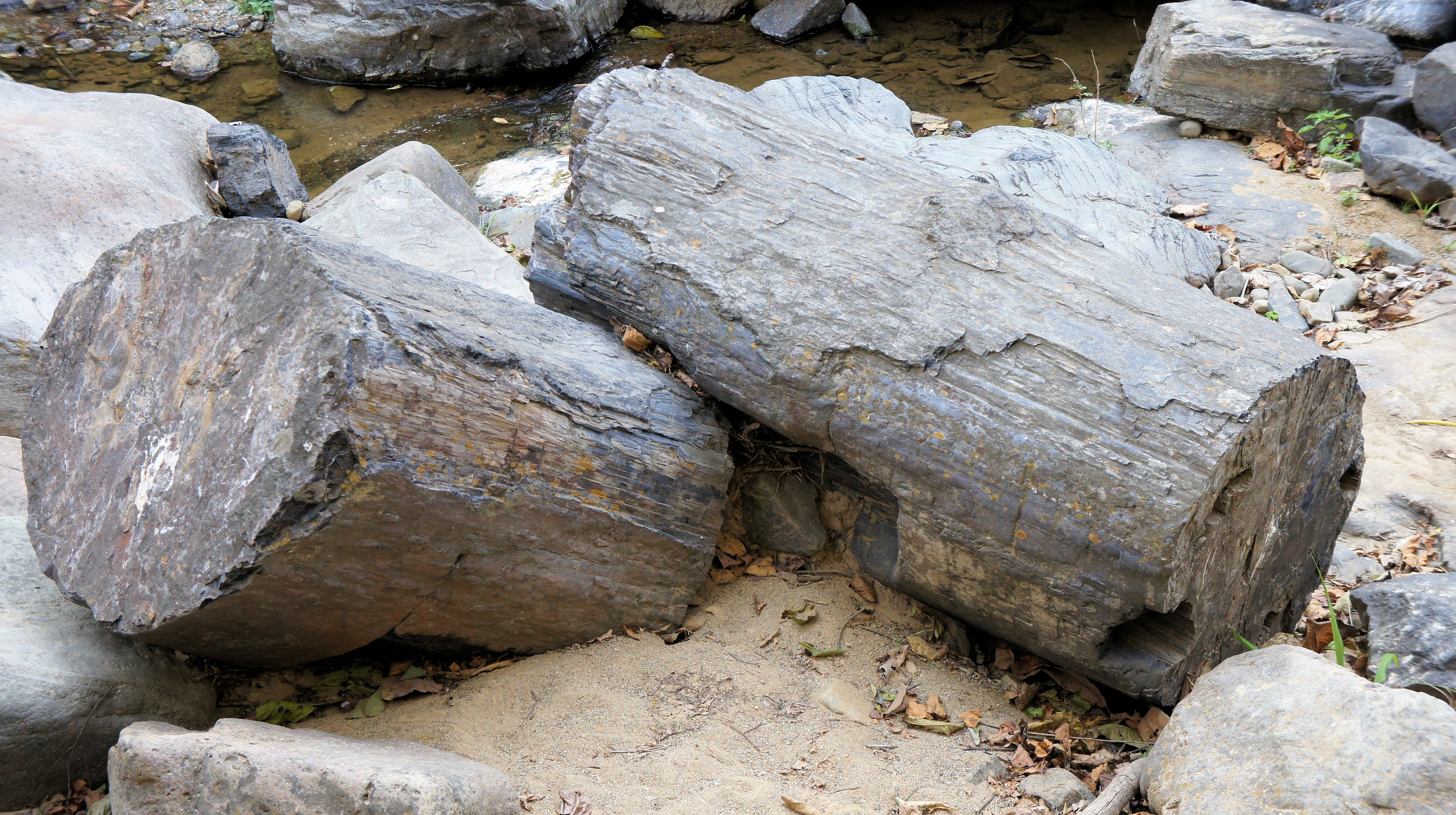
Two fossilized logs in the Puyango Petrified Forest in southern Ecuador.

Puyango Petrified Forest is a fossil deposit of petrified wood located in the middle basin of the Puyango River, between the Ecuadorian provinces of El Oro and Loja. The area covers 2,658 hectares and its sediments are divided into four geological formations, dating from the late Cretaceous period. These deposits are rich in both fossilized trunks and leaves - which belonged to the typical Mesozoic flora - as well as fossils of invertebrates such as bivalves, ammonites, echinoderms, among others.

== Characteristics ==
The forest is located between 360 and 500 meters above sea level and has an average temperature of 22.5 °C. The most appropriate season to visit is the dry season from May to December. During the winter season the area receives more than 900 mm of rain that change the landscape considerably, making the visit interesting also in these months. Puyango is one of the few remnants of dry tropical forest in the southwest of Ecuador where strong slopes and ravines have preserved the natural and complete natural vegetation of this type of ecosystem and other areas of secondary forest that are in recovery.

Puyango was formerly a sea; the oldest fossils correspond to marine organisms. This sea dried up, populated with forests and animals, organisms that after hundreds of years, due to great natural events were buried underground. Finally, by geological movements typical of the Earth's crust, these remains came to the surface again forming an invaluable sample of the remote past of the planet. The most recent fossils found are 60 million years old and the oldest fossils reach 500 million years.

== Attractions ==
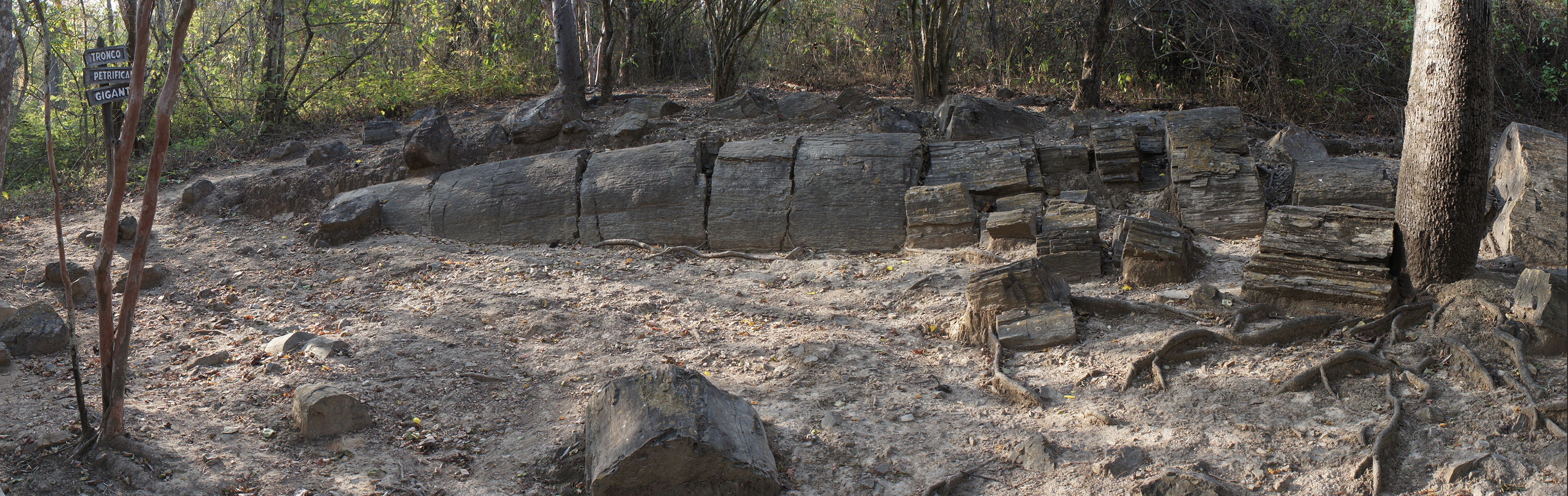
A large fossilized tree in the Puyango Petrified Forest in southern Ecuador.

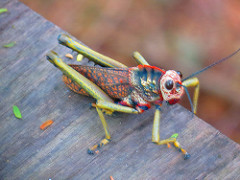
Multicolored grasshoppers with an approximate size of 14 cm found in the petrified forest.

The main attraction of the Puyango Petrified Forest are the petrified trees of the Araucarioxylon genus. The fossils are about 100 million years old and are perhaps the largest collection of petrified wood in the world; The largest specimen is 2 m in diameter and 15 m in length. There are also fossils of leaves corresponding to four genera of primitive plants resembling the present ferns and palms. According to Robert E. Shoemaker, a noted paleobotanist who studied the area between 1975 and 1976, the amount of petrified trunks contained in such a compact area represent one of the largest collections of this type in the world, comparable perhaps to Arizona's Petrified Forest National Park in the U.S.

In 1987, the area was also declared a protected forests to preserve natural resources, including some of the last remnants of dry forest in the region. Nowadays Puyango is managed by the prefectures of Loja and El Oro and the municipalities of Puyango and Las Lajas. In 2005, the Puyango Protected Forest was declared as an Important Bird Area by BirdLife International. There are 161 species of birds recorded at the Puyango Protected Forest, including 43 species endemic to the dry forest of western Ecuador and northwestern Peru.

== See also ==
- List of World Heritage Sites in Ecuador
