= Churute Mangroves Ecological Reserve =

Nature reserve in Ecuador

Manglares Churute Ecological Reserve
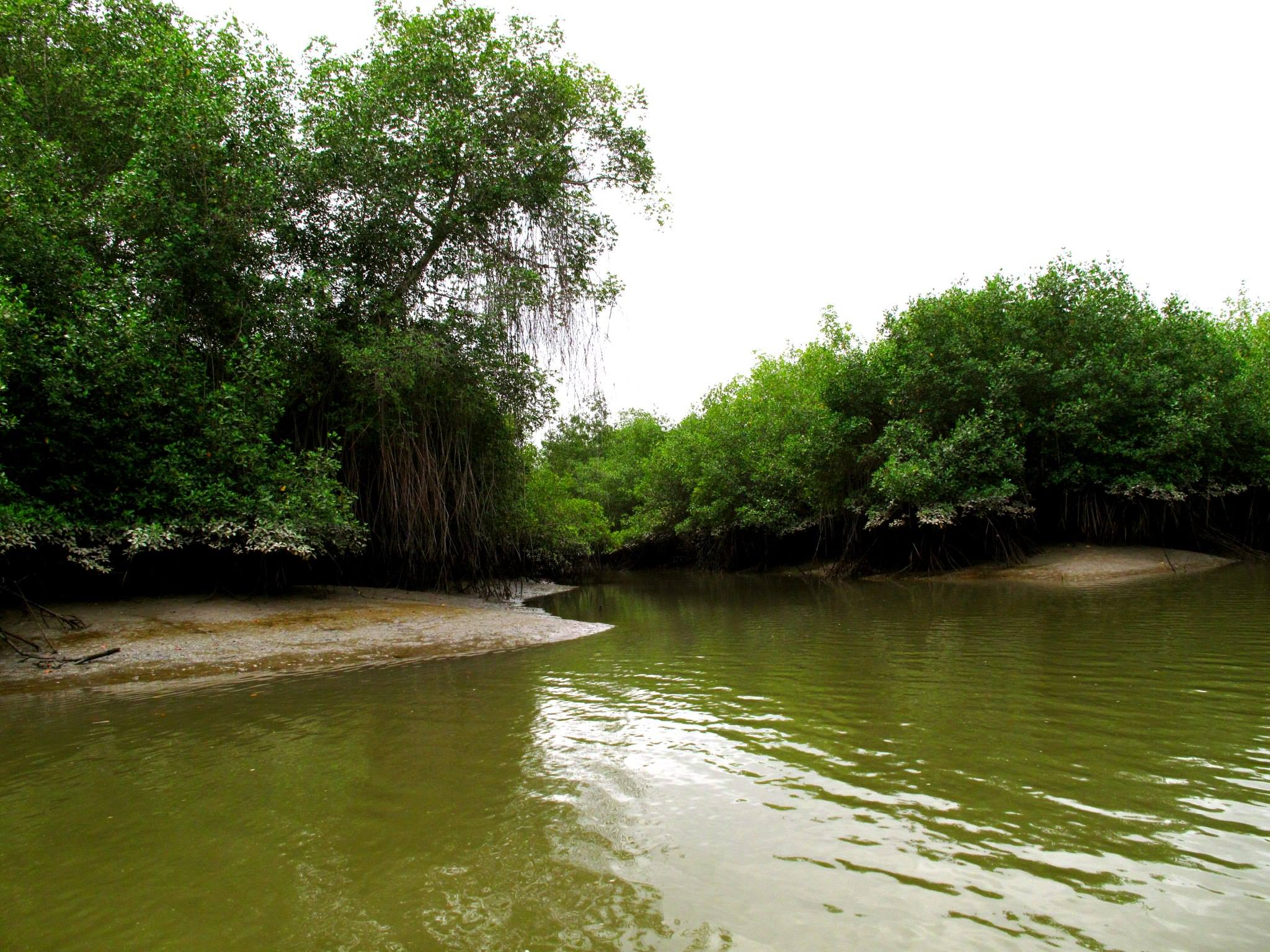
- Interactive map of Manglares Churute Ecological Reserve
- Location: Ecuador; Guayas Province
- Nearest city: Guayaquil
- Coordinates: 2.509°S 79.744°W
- Area: 494 km^{2} (191 sq mi)
- Established: 1979

Manglares Churute Ecological Reserve is located in the Guayas Province of Ecuador. The 86,589-acre (350.41 km^{2}) nature reserve is located 25 miles (40 km) from Guayaquil.

== Fauna ==
The many lakes located in the park are great ways to view many aquatic birds and tortoises. Ducks, herons, woodpeckers, badgers, anteaters, shrimp and crabs inhabit the inlets in the lakes.

== Flora ==
Near the water are many mangrove formations. Oak, ebony, silk-cotton trees and balsa are some trees found in the dry forests. Around most of the park orchids and bromeliads cover the landscape.

== Attractions ==
Canoe trips through mangrove areas allow the viewing of many unique species of fauna. Hiking is also an option here.

== See also ==
- List of national parks in Ecuador
