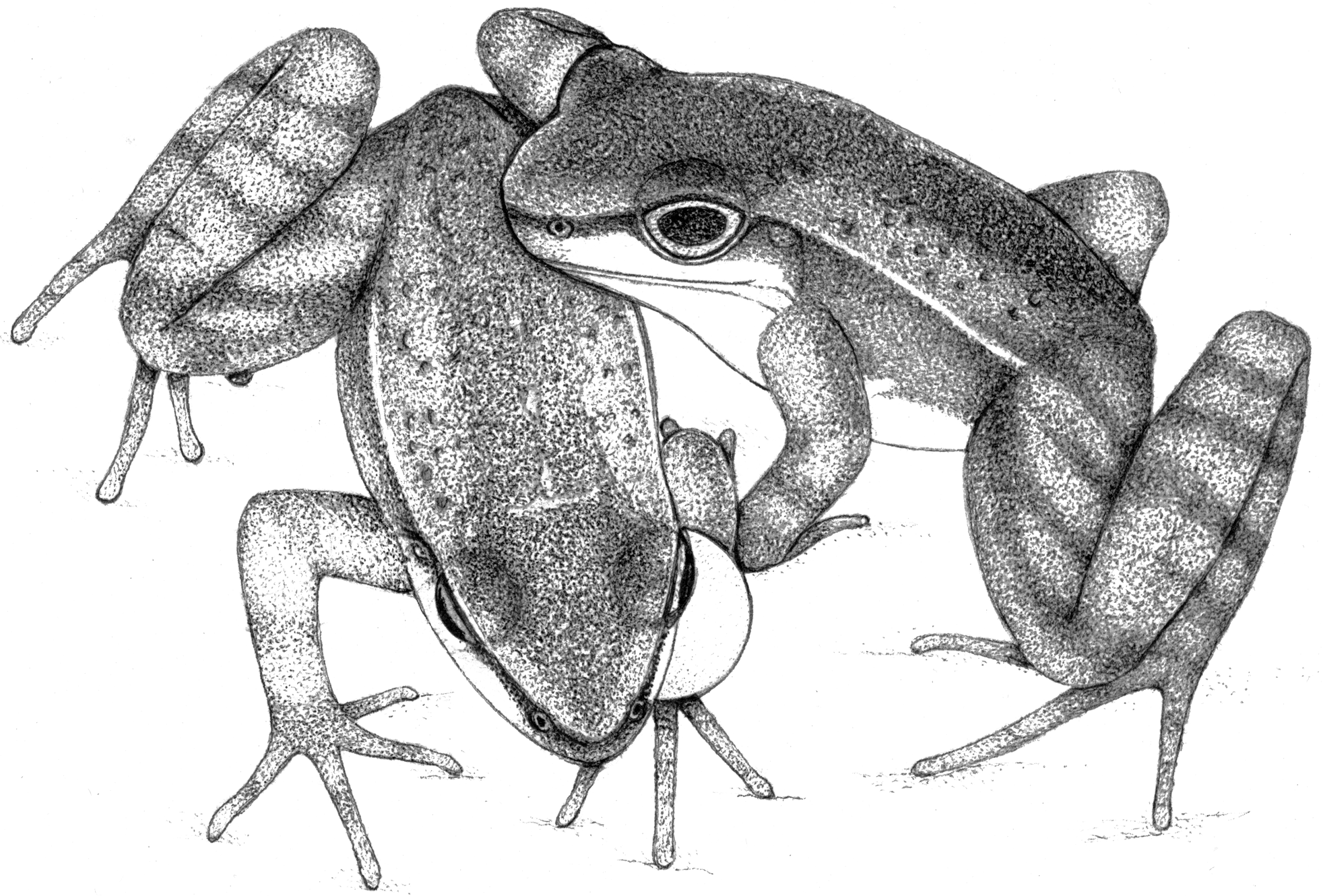
- Mating couple during courtship (female on right)

Scientific classification
- Kingdom: Animalia
- Phylum: Chordata
- Class: Amphibia
- Order: Anura
- Family: Hylodidae
- Genus: Hylodes
- Species: H. japi

Binomial name
- Hylodes japi Sá, Canedo, Lyra & Haddad, 2015

= Hylodes japi =

Species of amphibian

Hylodes japi is a species of frogs in the family Hylodidae.

== Taxonomy ==
The frog's specific name, japi, comes from a Tupi word meaning "springs", referencing the breeding environment of this species. The closest relatives of Hylodes japi are Hylodes amnicola, Hylodes ornatus, Hylodes perere, and Hylodes sazimai.

== Distribution ==
Hylodes japi is endemic to the Serra do Japi mountains, located in the São Paulo state, Brazil.

== Description ==
Hylodes japi couple during the elaborate courtship ritual.

Hylodes japi is a small, slender frog. When adult, males measure 22.9 to 25.5 millimeters, females - 26.4 to 28.0 millimeters, both with the head longer than wide, straight canthus, sunken lore, medium-sized, almost round tympanum, and side-directed nostril openings. Males additionally possess two lateral vocal sacs, which can distend to a great extent. The fore limbs are slender, and the hind limbs are robust. Several tubercles are present on them. The digits bear lateral fringes, more extensive on the toes than on the fingers, and more pronounced in males than females, as well as weakly developed scutes. The fingertips are small and almost in the shape of an ellipse; the toes end in nearly round discs. The thumbs do not possess any significant features. The frog's skin is mostly smooth, with some regions slightly textured. Although Hylodes japi is mostly silver in color, its body features dark spots and blotches, light, lateral stripes, and brown to chestnut bars. In preservative, the colors become less vivid. The tadpoles are brown with tones of yellow.

Deposited eggs measure 2.48 to 3.47 millimeters in diameter; they are unpigmented and whitish cream in color. The gelatinous capsule ranges from 7.81 to 8.16 millimeters in diameter.

Overall, this species can be distinguished from other members of its genus by a continuous oblique lateral fold as well as a lack of tubercles near it, a light-colored stripe, smoother dorsal surfaces, advertisement calls, and the ventral coloration.

== Ecology and behaviour ==
Hylodes japi male calling and performing visual displays with hind limbs in long-range agonistic context.

Hylodes japi occurs at 850–1050 meters above sea level, near swift rivulets, in semideciduous, mesophytic forest. Although the species is diurnal, calls can also be heard at night during the breeding season.

Males call sporadically; their advertisement call is harmonically structured. Its duration can range from 1.36 to 3.83 seconds, with 5.91 – 19.42 second intervals. Males choose which of their two vocal sacs will be used for visual signaling as well as which limb to signal with, performing toe trembling, toe flagging, toes posture, and foot flagging. The vocal sac's inflation is controlled; its movement and color is also important for visual communication.

Courtship can be observed during the daytime or at night. The breeding behaviour begins with males calling near a stream, and waiting for a female to engage. Once it happens, a suitable oviposition is decided on. If the female accepts the male's offer, the latter digs up a tunnel and a chamber in the sand of the riverbed, big enough for the two frogs, in which the intercourse occurs. After oviposition, the tunnel is concealed by the male.

The tadpoles are omnivorous, perhaps cannibalistic, and exotrophic. They feed more actively during the night than during the day. Their breeding chambers, inside of which they remain during the early stages of development, are abandoned after the formation of limb buds.

== Conservation status ==
The known population of Hylodes japi is regarded as stable. However, as the species is associated with fast moving rivulets, it is prone to environmental degradation. Although Serra do Japi is considered a protected area of Brazil, it faces strong developmental pressure from humans.
