= Crossodactylus boulengeri =

Conservation status
- Critically endangered, possibly extinct (IUCN 3.1)

Scientific classification
- Kingdom: Animalia
- Phylum: Chordata
- Class: Amphibia
- Order: Anura
- Family: Hylodidae
- Genus: Crossodactylus
- Species: C. boulengeri

Binomial name
- Crossodactylus boulengeri (De Witte, 1930)

Synonyms
- Calamobates boulengeri De Witte, 1930

Species of frog

Crossodactylus boulengeri is a species of frog in the family Hylodidae. It lives in the Serra do Mar mountain range in São Paulo and Rio de Janeiro in Brazil.

== Taxonomy ==
For some time, scientists considered this frog a junior synonym of Crossodactylus dispar. In 2014, a new study confirmed that they are truly two different species.

== Habitat ==
Scientists identified the species from museum samples, so they infer its behavior from the related C. dispar. They believe the frog is diurnal and lives in primary and secondary forest and reproduces in streams. Scientists have seen this frog between 100 and 1,600 m (330 and 5,250 ft) above sea level.

Scientists have seen the frog in two protected places: Parque Estadual da Serra do Mar and the Parque Nacional da Serra da Bocaina.

== Threats ==
The IUCN classifies this frog as critically endangered, possibly extinct. There are no more than fifty adult frogs alive at any time. The fungus Batrachochytrium dendrobatidis has killed many amphibians in the area, so scientists believe that the fungal disease chytridiomycosis and air pollution from nearby Cubatão may have killed the frogs synergistically.
