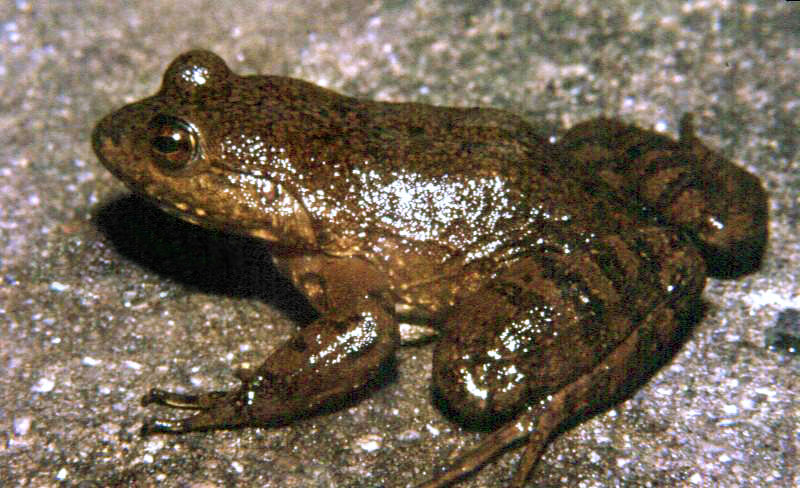

Conservation status
- Data Deficient (IUCN 3.1)

Scientific classification
- Kingdom: Animalia
- Phylum: Chordata
- Class: Amphibia
- Order: Anura
- Family: Hylodidae
- Genus: Phantasmarana
- Species: P. massarti

Binomial name
- Phantasmarana massarti (Witte, 1930)

Synonyms
- Megaelosia massarti

= Phantasmarana massarti =

Species of frog

Phantasmarana massarti is a species of frog in the family Hylodidae. It is endemic to Brazil. Its natural habitats are subtropical or tropical moist lowland forest and rivers.

It was formerly placed in the genus Megaelosia, but was reclassified to Phantasmarana in 2021.
