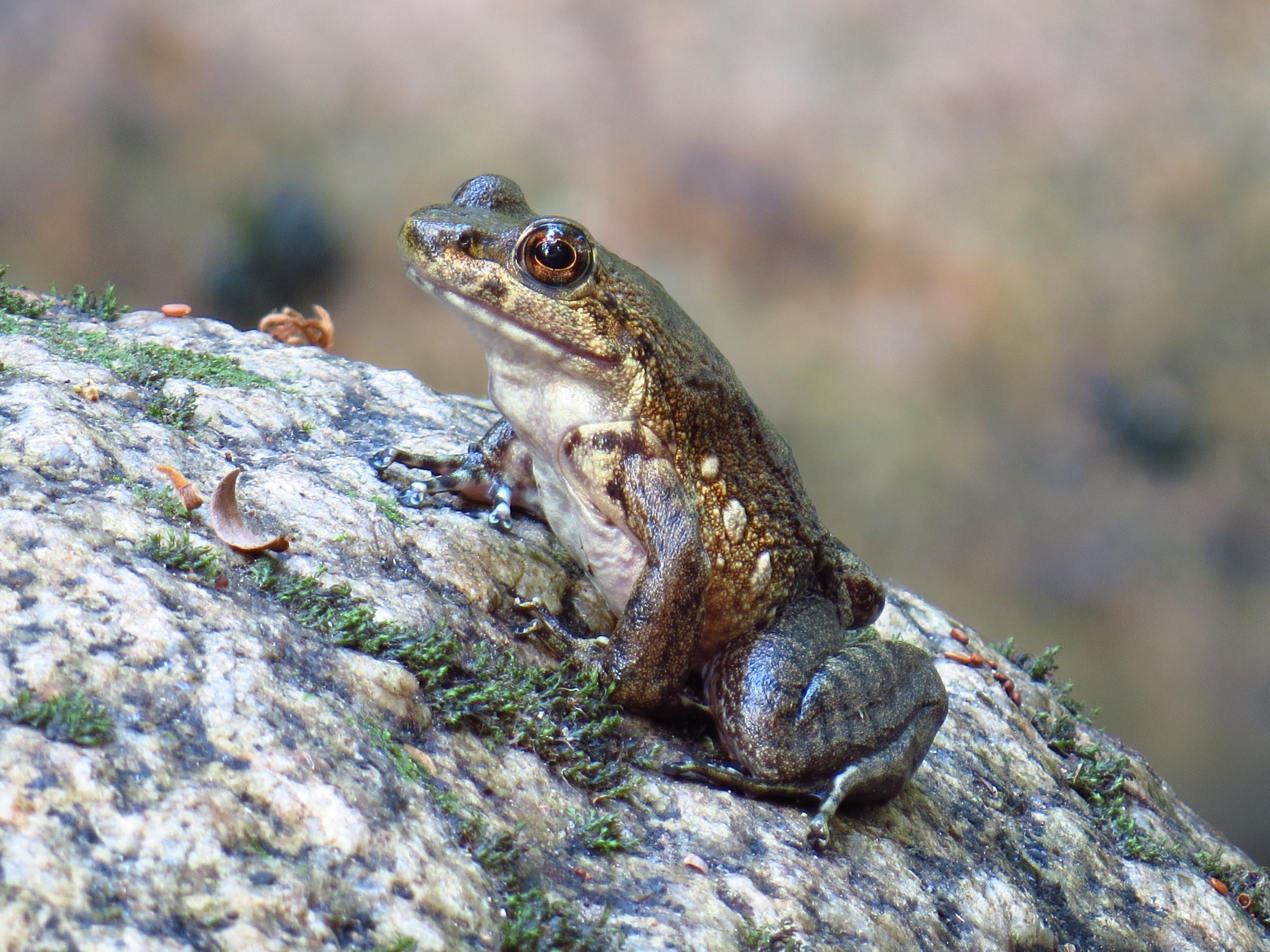

Conservation status
- Data Deficient (IUCN 3.1)

Scientific classification
- Kingdom: Animalia
- Phylum: Chordata
- Class: Amphibia
- Order: Anura
- Family: Hylodidae
- Genus: Phantasmarana
- Species: P. apuana

Binomial name
- Phantasmarana apuana (Pombal, Prado & Canedo, 2003)

Synonyms
- Megaelosia apuana Pombal, Prado & Canedo, 2003

= Phantasmarana apuana =

Species of frog

Phantasmarana apuana is a species of frog in the family Hylodidae. It is endemic to Brazil. Its natural habitats are subtropical or tropical moist montane forest and rivers. It is threatened by habitat loss.

It was formerly placed in the genus Megaelosia, but was reclassified to Phantasmarana in 2021.
