= Phantasmarana bocainensis =

Conservation status
- Data Deficient (IUCN 3.1)

Scientific classification
- Kingdom: Animalia
- Phylum: Chordata
- Class: Amphibia
- Order: Anura
- Family: Hylodidae
- Genus: Phantasmarana
- Species: P. bocainensis

Binomial name
- Phantasmarana bocainensis (Giaretta, Bokermann, and Haddad, 1993)

Synonyms
- Megaelosia bocainensis Giaretta, Bokermann, and Haddad, 1993

Species of frog

Phantasmarana bocainensis, also known as Bocaina big tooth frog, is a species of frog in the family Hylodidae. It is endemic to Brazil and only known from its type locality in the Serra da Bocaina National Park, São Paulo state.

It was formerly placed in the genus Megaelosia, but was reclassified to Phantasmarana in 2021.

== Description ==
Phantasmarana bocainensis was described from a single specimen, a juvenile female measuring 67 mm (2.6 in) in snout–vent length (the holotype)—as of 2004, no other individuals were known. The dorsolateral skin is granular. The snout is rounded in dorsal view and bluntly rounded in profile. The canthus rostralis is evident and slightly arched.

== Habitat and conservation ==
The holotype was found concealed under a rock at the margin of a mountain stream at night. Threats to this species are unknown but the type locality is a protected area. Since its last sighting in 1968, the Phantasmarana bocainensis frog was presumed to have been extinct. In August 2020, researchers conducted eDNA metabarcoding to extract DNA left behind by living organisms in rivers, ponds, bromeliads, streams and puddles in southeastern Brazil. From this sampling, they found DNA from the Phantasmarana bocainensis frog and confirmed the presence of the species.
