= Phantasmarana lutzae =

Conservation status
- Data Deficient (IUCN 3.1)

Scientific classification
- Kingdom: Animalia
- Phylum: Chordata
- Class: Amphibia
- Order: Anura
- Family: Hylodidae
- Genus: Phantasmarana
- Species: P. lutzae

Binomial name
- Phantasmarana lutzae (Izecksohn and Gouvêa, 1987)

Synonyms
- Megaelosia lutzae Izecksohn and Gouvêa, 1987

Species of frog

Phantasmarana lutzae is a species of frog in the family Hylodidae. It is endemic to Brazil and only known from its type locality in the Itatiaia National Park, Rio de Janeiro state. It is named in honor of Bertha Lutz, a Brazilian zoologist and feminist.

It was formerly placed in the genus Megaelosia, but was reclassified to Phantasmarana in 2021.

== Description ==
Phantasmarana lutzae are relatively large frogs: two males in the type series measure 88–93 mm (3.5–3.7 in) and a female 90 mm (3.5 in) in snout–vent length. Dorsolateral skin has many large granules. The snout acuminate in dorsal view and rounded in profile. Canthus rostralis is evident and straight.

A single tadpole in Gosner stage 42 (towards the completion of metamorphosis) measured 130 mm (5.1 in) in total length.

== Habitat and conservation ==
The species' natural habitats are streams in primary forest. During daytime these frogs are found on emergent rocks in shallow places in streams. They lay the eggs under large rocks in moderately-sized forest streams.

The Itatiaia National Park is well protected, and there are no known significant threats to this species.
