= Phantasmarana jordanensis =

Conservation status
- Data Deficient (IUCN 3.1)

Scientific classification
- Kingdom: Animalia
- Phylum: Chordata
- Class: Amphibia
- Order: Anura
- Family: Hylodidae
- Genus: Phantasmarana
- Species: P. jordanensis

Binomial name
- Phantasmarana jordanensis (Heyer, 1983)

Synonyms
- Cycloramphus jordanensis Heyer, 1983; Megaelosia jordanensis

Species of frog

Phantasmarana jordanensis is a species of frog in the family Hylodidae. It is endemic to southeastern Brazil and only known from its type locality, Campos do Jordão in the São Paulo state. Its natural habitat is forest at 1,700 m (5,600 ft) asl.

Tadpoles are large, measuring up to 107 mm (4.2 in) in total length, of which the tail makes about two thirds.

It was formerly placed in the genus Megaelosia, but was reclassified to Phantasmarana in 2021.
