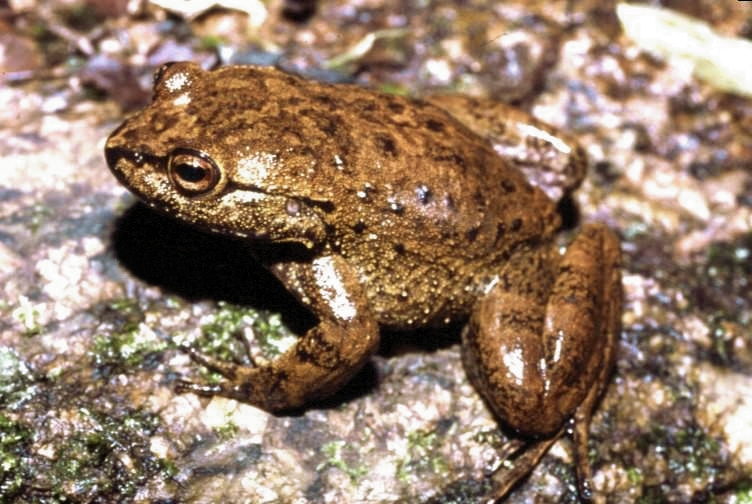

Conservation status
- Data Deficient (IUCN 3.1)

Scientific classification
- Kingdom: Animalia
- Phylum: Chordata
- Class: Amphibia
- Order: Anura
- Family: Hylodidae
- Genus: Phantasmarana
- Species: P. boticariana

Binomial name
- Phantasmarana boticariana (Giaretta and Aguiar, 1998)

Synonyms
- Megaelosia boticariana Antônio Giaretta and Aguiar, 1998

= Phantasmarana boticariana =

Species of frog

Phantasmarana boticariana is a species of frog in the family Hylodidae. It is endemic to southeastern Brazil and only known from few specimens from its type locality, Parque Estadual do Itapetinga in Atibaia, São Paulo state.

It was formerly placed in the genus Megaelosia, but was reclassified to Phantasmarana in 2021.

== Description ==
The type series consists of two females measuring 75 and 78 mm (3.0 and 3.1 in) and a juvenile measuring 47 mm (1.9 in) in snout–vent length, but the largest observed specimen was a female measuring 95 mm (3.7 in). The snout is rounded. The tympanum is small but distinct, despite being partly covered by the supratympanic fold. The finger and the toe tips are slightly enlarged. Toes hava basal webbing and extensive fringes. Skin is smooth but bne specimen has large, sparse warts on the dorsolateral parts of its body. The dorsum is yellowish-brown or green. There are many, small yellow blotches on the belly and the throat. The limbs are barred. The iris is copper with fine, black reticulation.

The tadpoles are large, with a Gosner stage 25 specimen measuring 99 mm (3.9 in), of which the ovoid body makes 34%.

== Habitat and conservation ==
The type series was collected from a small, clean, cold montane rivulet in forest at an elevation of 800 m (2,600 ft) or 1,250 m (4,100 ft) above sea level. Tadpoles were collected from deeper pools.

This species is potentially threatened by habitat loss caused by fire and human settlement. The type locality is a protected area.

Phantasmarana boticariana is only known from the Parque Estadual do Itapetinga in São Paulo state, Brazil
