= Hylodes magalhaesi =

Conservation status
- Data Deficient (IUCN 3.1)

Scientific classification
- Kingdom: Animalia
- Phylum: Chordata
- Class: Amphibia
- Order: Anura
- Family: Hylodidae
- Genus: Hylodes
- Species: H. magalhaesi

Binomial name
- Hylodes magalhaesi (Bokermann, 1964)

Species of frog

Hylodes magalhaesi, or the São Paulo tree toad, is a species of frog in the family Hylodidae. It is endemic to Brazil. Its natural habitats are subtropical or tropical moist montane forest and rivers. It is threatened by habitat loss. They measure between 28 and 32 mm, and live at altitudes of 1400 to 1800 m in the Mantiqueira mountain range.

== Appearance ==
The adult male frog measures about 29.2 mm long from nose to rear end and the adult female frog about 33 mm. Scientists note that their tympanums are larger in diameter than their eyes. The skin of the dorsum is dark with white blotches.

== Young ==
The tadpoles of this frog can be found year-round in streams in primary forests.

== Threats ==
Scientists link the reduced population of this frog to habitat loss, including urbanization and deforestation. Introduced species may also be outcompeting it. In 2013, scientists reported the presence of the deadly chytridiomycosis fungus growing on some specimens. This fungus can be lethal to amphibians.

== Etymology ==
This frog's Latin name was given in honor of Dr. José Carlos Reis de Magalhães, who helped collect samples and perform studies.
