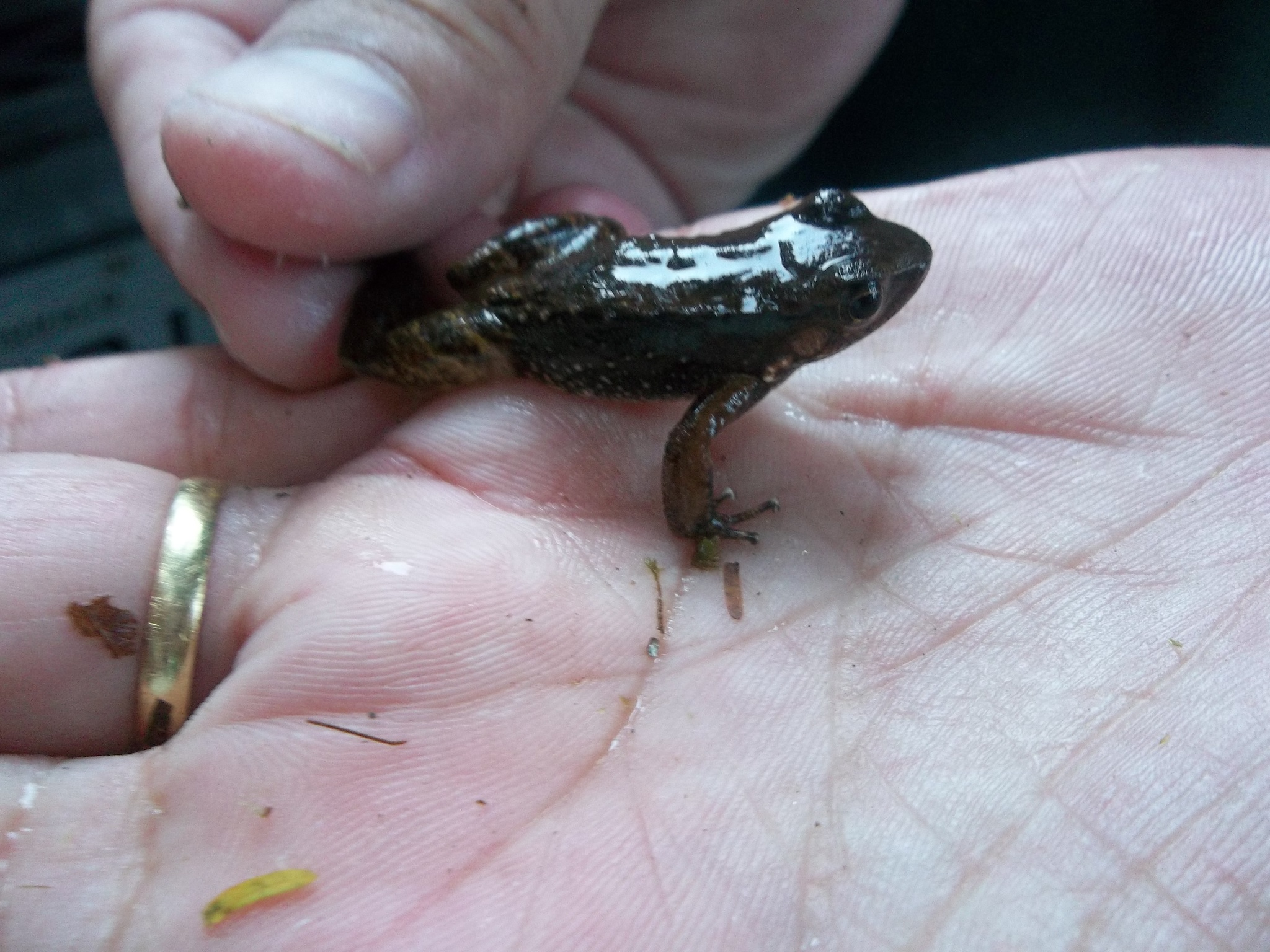

Conservation status
- Data Deficient (IUCN 3.1)

Scientific classification
- Kingdom: Animalia
- Phylum: Chordata
- Class: Amphibia
- Order: Anura
- Family: Hylodidae
- Genus: Hylodes
- Species: H. pipilans

Binomial name
- Hylodes pipilans Canedo & Pombal, 2007

= Hylodes pipilans =

Species of frog

Hylodes pipilans is a species of frog in the family Hylodidae, known to occur near the Soberbo River at Serra dos Órgãos at elevations between 245 and 814 meters above sea level, municipality of Guapimirim, and in the municipality of Cachoeiras de Macacu, both located in the state of Rio de Janeiro, Brazil. It is diurnally active.

== Original description ==
- Canedo C; Pombal Jp, Jr (2007). "Two new species of torrent frog of the genus Hylodes (Anura, Hylodidiae) with nuptial thumb tubercles". Herpetologica. 63: 224–235.
