= Hylodes glaber =

Conservation status
- Data Deficient (IUCN 3.1)

Scientific classification
- Kingdom: Animalia
- Phylum: Chordata
- Class: Amphibia
- Order: Anura
- Family: Hylodidae
- Genus: Hylodes
- Species: H. glaber

Binomial name
- Hylodes glaber (Miranda-Ribeiro, 1926)

Species of frog

Hylodes glaber or the Itatiaia tree toad is a species of frog in the family Hylodidae. It is endemic to Brazil and has been observed in and near Itatiaia. Its natural habitats are subtropical or tropical moist montane forest, subtropical or tropical high-altitude grassland, and rivers. It is threatened by habitat loss.
