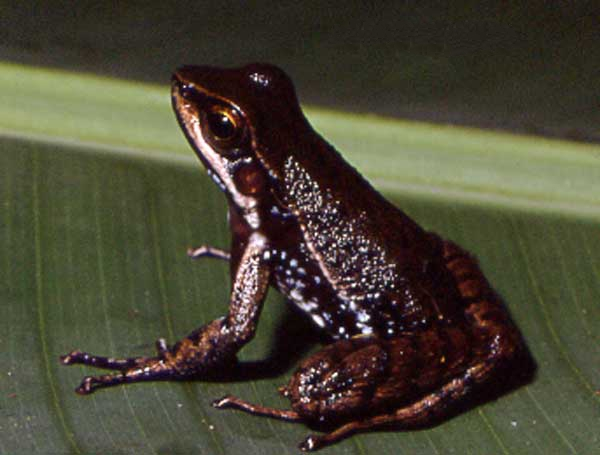

Conservation status
- Data Deficient (IUCN 3.1)

Scientific classification
- Kingdom: Animalia
- Phylum: Chordata
- Class: Amphibia
- Order: Anura
- Family: Hylodidae
- Genus: Hylodes
- Species: H. heyeri

Binomial name
- Hylodes heyeri Haddad, Pombal & Bastos, 1996

= Hylodes heyeri =

Species of frog

Hylodes heyeri is a species of frog in the family Hylodidae. It is endemic to Brazil. Its natural habitats are subtropical or tropical moist lowland forest, subtropical or tropical moist montane forest, rivers, and subterranean habitats (other than caves) on the Atlantic side of the country. It is threatened by habitat loss.

This frog has smooth skin and light stripes. The skin of the frog's back is brown in color. Not all individuals have tubercles.

Scientists named this frog after Ron Heyer, who contributed to the sum of knowledge of Brazilian amphibians.
