= Crossodactylus franciscanus =

Scientific classification
- Kingdom: Animalia
- Phylum: Chordata
- Class: Amphibia
- Order: Anura
- Family: Hylodidae
- Genus: Crossodactylus
- Species: C. franciscanus

Binomial name
- Crossodactylus franciscanus Carcerelli and Caramaschi, 1993

Species of frog

Crossodactylus franciscanus is a species of frog in the family Hylodidae. It is endemic to Brazil and has been observed at two sites, both in the state of Minas Gerais.

== Original description ==
- Pimenta BVS; Caramaschi U; Cruz CAG (2015). "Synonymy of Crossodactylus bokermanni Caramaschi & Sazima, 1985 with Crossodactylus trachystomus (Reinhardt & Leutken, 1862) and description of a new species from Minas Gerais, Brazil (Anura: Hylodidae)". Zootaxa (Abstract and figures). 3955 (1): 65–82. doi:10.11646/zootaxa.3955.1.3.
