= Crossodactylus caramaschii =

Conservation status
- Least Concern (IUCN 3.1)

Scientific classification
- Kingdom: Animalia
- Phylum: Chordata
- Class: Amphibia
- Order: Anura
- Family: Hylodidae
- Genus: Crossodactylus
- Species: C. caramaschii

Binomial name
- Crossodactylus caramaschii Bastos & Pombal, 1995

Species of frog

Crossodactylus caramaschii is a species of frog in the family Hylodidae. It is endemic to Brazil.in São Paulo, Santa Catarina, and Paraná. Its natural habitats are subtropical or tropical moist lowland forest and rivers. It is threatened by habitat loss.
