= Hylodes regius =

Conservation status
- Critically Endangered (IUCN 3.1)

Scientific classification
- Kingdom: Animalia
- Phylum: Chordata
- Class: Amphibia
- Order: Anura
- Family: Hylodidae
- Genus: Hylodes
- Species: H. regius

Binomial name
- Hylodes regius Gouvêa, 1979

Species of frog

Hylodes regius, also known as the royal tree toad, is a species of frog in the family Hylodidae. The specific name regius is not explained in the original species description but probably refers to the yellow and purple-red (colors with royal associations) markings in male Hylodes regius. It is endemic to the Itatiaia Mountains in Minas Gerais, Brazil. After more than three decades without observations, it was detected again in 2012.

== Description ==
Adult males measure 33–36 mm (1.3–1.4 in) in snout–vent length. There are two distinct color morphs of adult males: a greenish brown or greenish black dorsal coloration, both with scattered golden yellow blotches and white dots that form oblique lateral stripes; the blotches and dots are also present on the dorsal faces of the fore and hind limbs. The ventral faces of the arms, tibiae, and thighs, as well as the concealed dorsal surfaces of tarsi and feet, are vivid purple-red. Ventral surfaces are peppered with well-defined white spots. The belly is red.

Males emit both advertisement calls and territorial calls. Calling takes place during the day.

A Gosner stage 35 tadpole measured 52 mm (2.0 in) in total length and 19 mm (0.75 in) body length.

== Distribution and habitat ==
The known distribution of Hylodes regius is restricted to a single valley in the Itatiaia Mountains that is contained within the Itatiaia National Park. It occurs in primary forest in and around streams at elevations of 1,850–2,100 m (6,070–6,890 ft) above sea level. Males can be found calling between rocks, on the ground, and perched on shrubs.

== Conservation ==
The known range of this species is all within the Itatiaia National Park. However, total population size is considered to be very small, below 50 adults. Furthermore, Hylodes tadpoles are often susceptible to Batrachochytrium dendrobatidis, and there is circumstantial evidence that Hylodes regius tadpoles have also been affected. Climate change is projected to degrade the high-elevation forest habitat of this species. It is also threatened by dumping of waste to the streams that it lives in.
