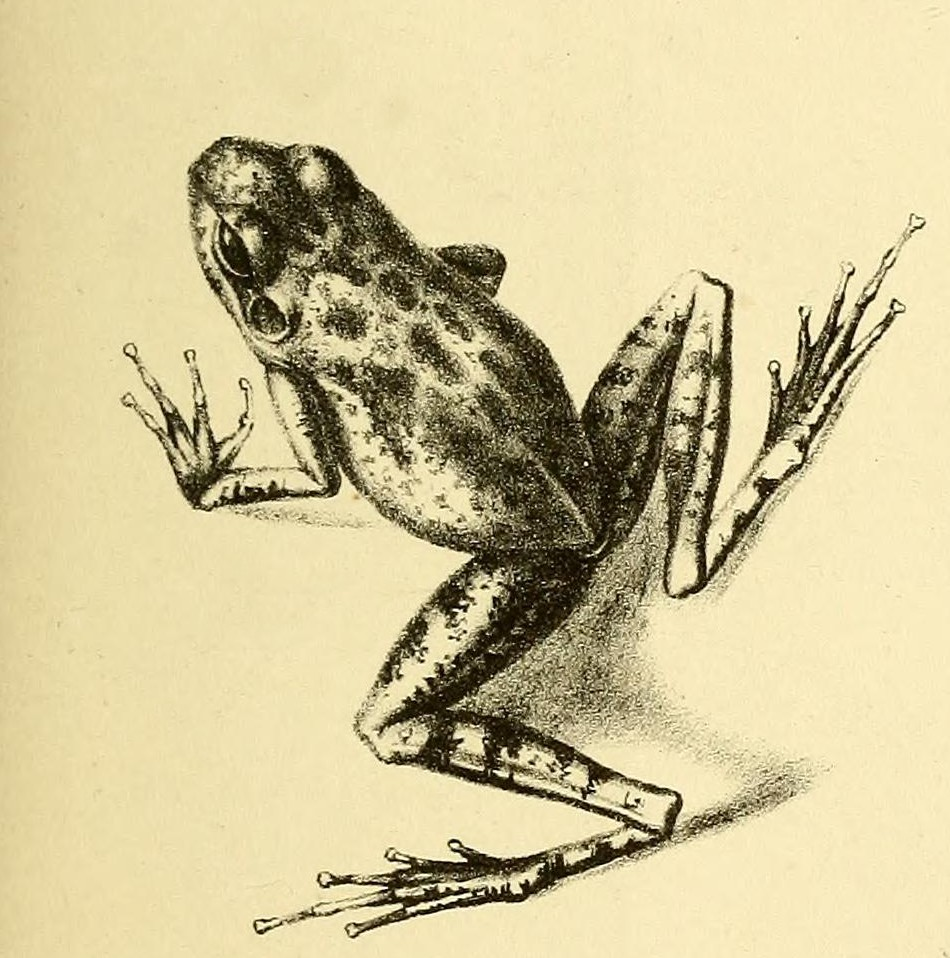

Conservation status
- Least Concern (IUCN 3.1)

Scientific classification
- Kingdom: Animalia
- Phylum: Chordata
- Class: Amphibia
- Order: Anura
- Family: Hylodidae
- Genus: Hylodes
- Species: H. nasus

Binomial name
- Hylodes nasus (Lichtenstein, 1823)

= Hylodes nasus =

Species of frog

Hylodes nasus is a species of frog in the family Hylodidae. It is endemic to Brazil. Its natural habitats are subtropical or tropical moist lowland forest and rivers. This frog has been observed 1400 meters above sea level.

The adult male frog measures 25.3–28.1 mm in snout-vent length. The skin of the dorsum can be brown or gray in color, with stripes and marks. The skin of the ventrum is white in color.

This frog is threatened by habitat loss.
