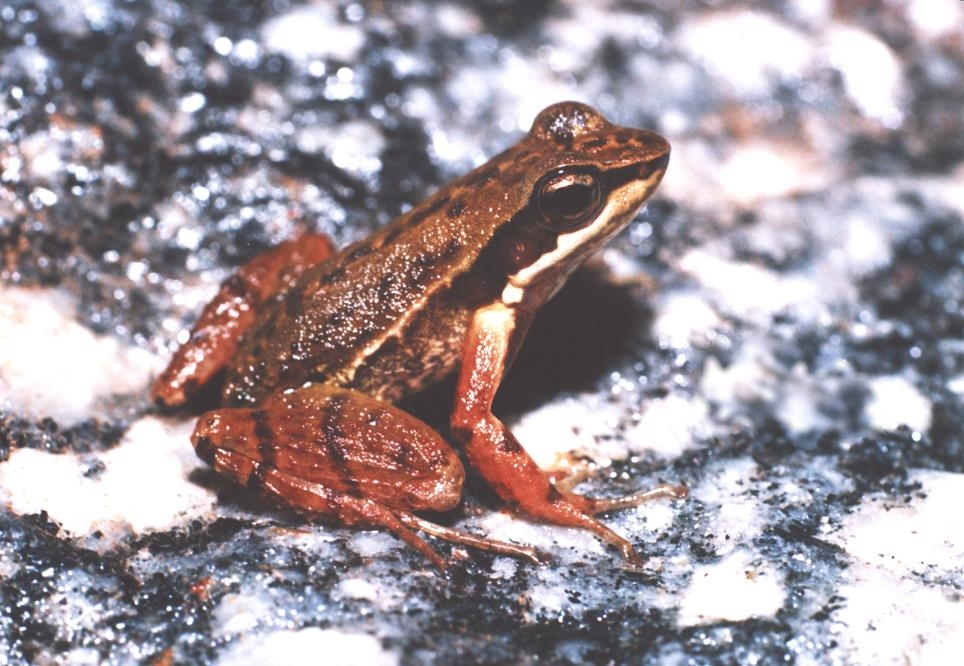

Conservation status
- Least Concern (IUCN 3.1)

Scientific classification
- Kingdom: Animalia
- Phylum: Chordata
- Class: Amphibia
- Order: Anura
- Family: Hylodidae
- Genus: Hylodes
- Species: H. phyllodes

Binomial name
- Hylodes phyllodes Heyer & Cocroft, 1986

= Hylodes phyllodes =

Species of frog

Hylodes phyllodes, or the Boraceia tree toad, is a species of frog in the family Hylodidae. It is endemic to Brazil. It has been observed in Serro do Mar in the state of São Paulo. Its natural habitats are subtropical or tropical moist lowland forest and rivers. It is threatened by habitat loss.
