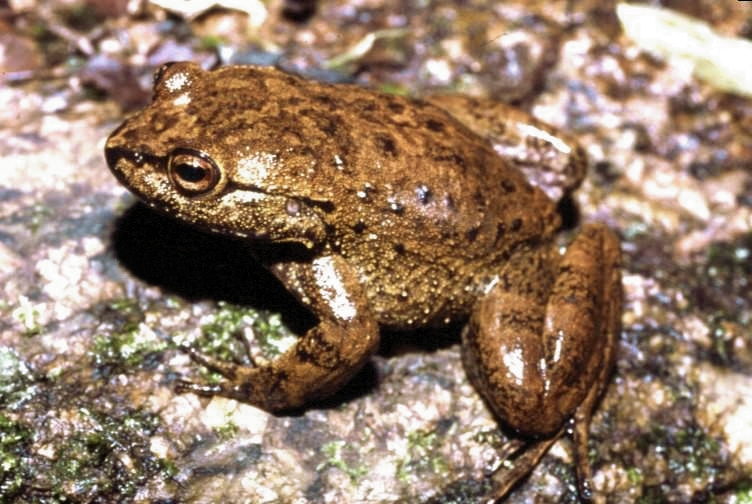
- Phantasmarana boticariana

Scientific classification
- Kingdom: Animalia
- Phylum: Chordata
- Class: Amphibia
- Order: Anura
- Family: Hylodidae
- Genus: Phantasmarana; Vittorazzi et al., 2021

Species
- See text

= Phantasmarana =

Genus of amphibians

Phantasmarana is a genus of frogs in the family Hylodidae. The genus is endemic to the Atlantic Forest of southeastern Brazil.

Members of this genus are associated with fast-flowing rivers. They are difficult to collect because they are easily disturbed and plunge into the torrential waters. Their teeth of are fanglike and larger than those of their close relatives. This might be associated with their predatory habits: at least two species are known prey on small vertebrates as well as invertebrates. The tadpoles are aquatic. Phantasmarana are relatively large frogs, with adults attaining lengths up to 120 mm (4.7 in) in snout–vent length.

The genus name, Phantasmarana (literally translating to "phantom frog"), refers to the extreme rarity of wild members of this genus, as well as the lack of an advertisement call from members of the genus, instead making enigmatic noises. Members of Phantasmarana were formerly placed in Megaelosia, which is now thought to contain only one species. Phantasmarana is thought to be the sister genus to Hylodes.

== Species ==
There are eight species:

- Phantasmarana apuana (Pombal, Prado, and Canedo, 2003)
- Phantasmarana bocainensis (Giaretta, Bokermann, and Haddad, 1993)
- Phantasmarana boticariana (Giaretta and Aguiar, 1998)
- Phantasmarana curucutuensis de Sá, Condez, Lyra, Haddad, and Malagoli, 2022
- Phantasmarana jordanensis (Heyer, 1983)
- Phantasmarana lutzae (Izecksohn and Gouvêa, 1987)
- Phantasmarana massarti (De Witte, 1930)
- Phantasmarana tamuia de Sá, Condez, Lyra, Haddad, and Malagoli, 2022
