= Hylodes caete =

Conservation status
- Least Concern (IUCN 3.1)

Scientific classification
- Kingdom: Animalia
- Phylum: Chordata
- Class: Amphibia
- Order: Anura
- Family: Hylodidae
- Genus: Hylodes
- Species: H. caete

Binomial name
- Hylodes caete Malagoli, de Sá, Canedo & Haddad, 2017

Species of amphibian

Hylodes caete is a species of frogs in the family Hylodidae. It is endemic to Serra do Mar, in the State of São Paulo, southeastern Brazil.

== Etymology ==
The specific name caete is derived from two Tupi words, caa and ete, meaning "true forests."

== Description ==
Adult males measure 31–32 mm (1.2–1.3 in) in snout–vent length. It is the fourth member of the genus to found nuptial tubercles on the thumb.

== Habitat ==
The species can be found in dense, closed-canopy forests and in ravines with fast-flowing streams. Scientists have seen this frog between 718 and 818 m (2,356 and 2,684 ft) above sea level and have reported it in several protected areas: Parque Estadual da Serra do Mar, Parque Estadual do Jurupara, Parque Municipal Nascentes de Paranapiacaba, and Reserva Biológica Alto da Serra de Paranapiacaba.

== Reproduction ==
The male frogs perch on tree trunks, roots, rocks, or low vegetation and call to the female frogs. The female frogs deposit their eggs in the streams, where the tadpoles develop.

== Threats ==
The IUCN classifies this frog as least concern of extinction. The frog lives in Serra do Mar, which has large tracts of suitable Atlantic forest. Only about 25 percent of the population is threatened, in this case by habitat conversion in favor of urbanization, agriculture, silviculture, and cattle grazing. The area was once subject to extensive logging, but only small-scale wood collection remains.
