= Phantasmarana tamuia =

Scientific classification
- Kingdom: Animalia
- Phylum: Chordata
- Class: Amphibia
- Order: Anura
- Family: Hylodidae
- Genus: Phantasmarana
- Species: P. tamuia

Binomial name
- Phantasmarana tamuia de Sá, Condez, Lyra, Haddad, and Malagoli, 2022

Species of frog

Phantasmarana tamuia is a species of frog in the family Hylodidae. It lives in São Paulo in Brazil.

== Original description ==
- De Sá FP; Condez TH; Lyra ML; Haddad CFB; Malagoli LR (March 14, 2022). "Unveiling the diversity of Giant Neotropical Torrent frogs (Hylodidae): phylogenetic relationships, morphology, and the description of two new species". Systematics and Biodiversity (Abstract). 20: 1–31. doi:10.1080/14772000.2022.2039318. hdl:11449/230636.
