= Hylodes dactylocinus =

Conservation status
- Data Deficient (IUCN 3.1)

Scientific classification
- Kingdom: Animalia
- Phylum: Chordata
- Class: Amphibia
- Order: Anura
- Family: Hylodidae
- Genus: Hylodes
- Species: H. dactylocinus

Binomial name
- Hylodes dactylocinus Pavan, Narvaes, and Rodrigues, 2001

Species of frog

Hylodes dactylocinus is a species of frog in the family Hylodidae. It is endemic to Serra do Itatins, in the São Paulo state, southeastern Brazil.

== Description ==
Adult males measure 24–27 mm (0.94–1.06 in) and females 25–31 mm (0.98–1.22 in) in snout–vent length.

== Behaviour ==
Hylodes dactylocinus are diurnal sit-and-wait predators, using emerged logs and rocks as their standing points. Males are territorial and use both visual and acoustic signalling to attract females and to maintain their territories. Male Hylodes dactylocinus construct an underwater chamber. This is used for (presumably) amplexus and oviposition. The male closes the chamber after the oviposition; there is no further parental care.

== Habitat and conservation ==
The species' natural habitats are small streams in primary and secondary forests. Active by day, males can be observed calling from rocks along streams.

While Hylodes dactylocinus is very common in primary forest, its numbers are lower in secondary forest. It is threatened by habitat loss, even within the protected area in which it occurs.
