= Hylodes perplicatus =

Conservation status
- Least Concern (IUCN 3.1)

Scientific classification
- Kingdom: Animalia
- Phylum: Chordata
- Class: Amphibia
- Order: Anura
- Family: Hylodidae
- Genus: Hylodes
- Species: H. perplicatus

Binomial name
- Hylodes perplicatus (Miranda-Ribeiro, 1926)

Species of frog

Hylodes perplicatus or Humboldt's tree toad is a species of frog in the family Hylodidae. It is endemic to Brazil. Its natural habitats are subtropical or tropical moist lowland forest and rivers. It is threatened by habitat loss.
