= Hylodes fredi =

Conservation status
- Data Deficient (IUCN 3.1)

Scientific classification
- Kingdom: Animalia
- Phylum: Chordata
- Class: Amphibia
- Order: Anura
- Family: Hylodidae
- Genus: Hylodes
- Species: H. fredi

Binomial name
- Hylodes fredi Canedo & Pombal, 2007

Species of frog

Hylodes fredi is a species of frog in the family Hylodidae, endemic to the island of Ilha Grande, Brazil.

== Description and biology ==
The tadpoles of Hylodes fredi whose limb buds have not yet formed reach a maximum size of 75.3 millimeters. Their color ranges between gray and brown; additionally, brown splotches can be seen on the body. The abdomen is slightly transparent, and the caudal fins are opaque. Adult males have been observed in calling activity throughout almost the whole year.

== Original description ==
- Canedo C; Pombal Jp, Jr (2007). "Two new species of torrent frog of the genus Hylodes (Anura, Hylodidiae) with nuptial thumb tubercles". Herpetologica. 63: 224–235.
