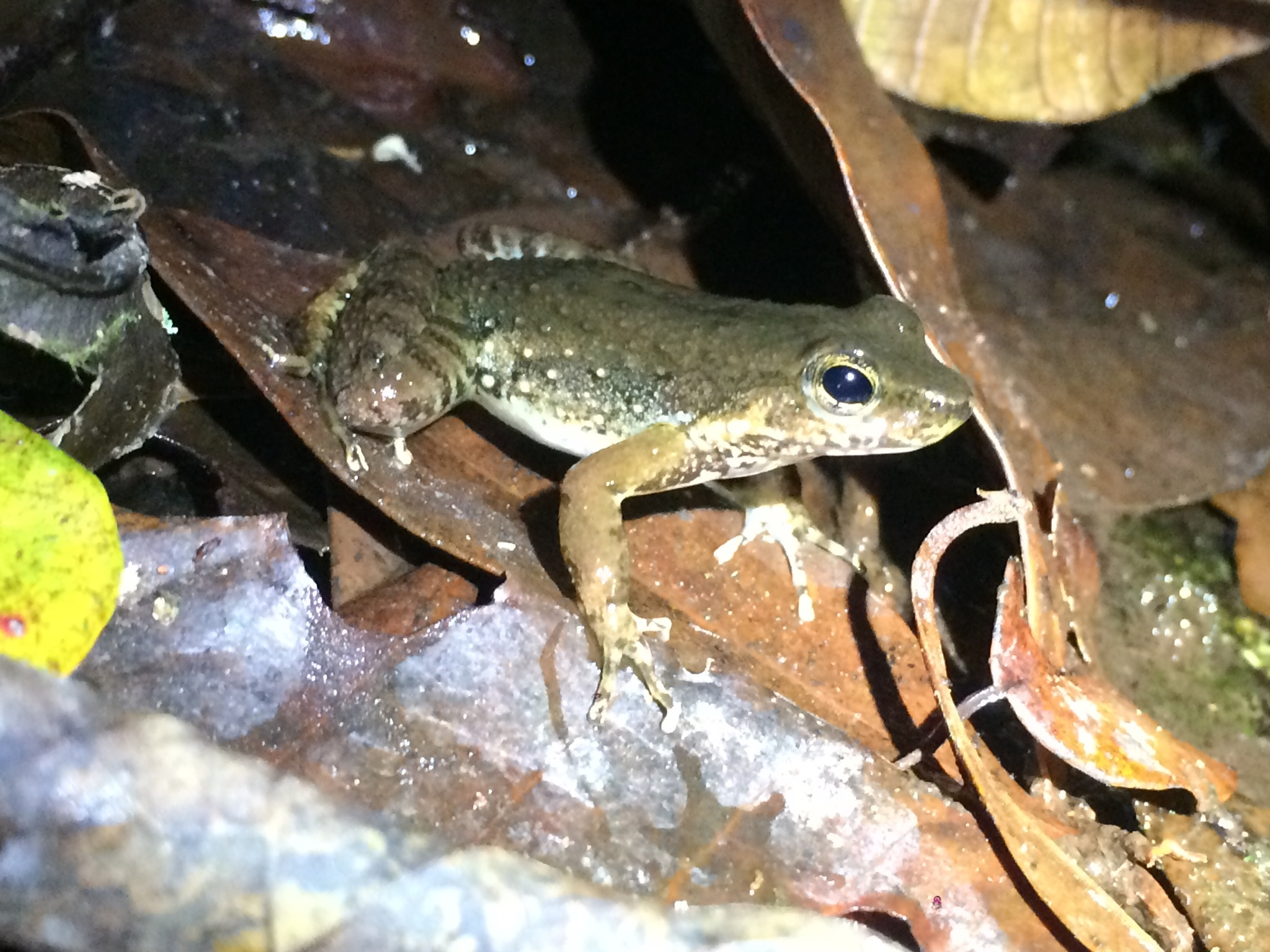

Conservation status
- Data Deficient (IUCN 3.1)

Scientific classification
- Kingdom: Animalia
- Phylum: Chordata
- Class: Amphibia
- Order: Anura
- Family: Hylodidae
- Genus: Crossodactylus
- Species: C. dantei

Binomial name
- Crossodactylus dantei (Carcerelli & Caramaschi, 1993)

= Crossodactylus dantei =

Species of frog

Crossodactylus dantei or the Murici spinythumb frog, is a species of frog in the family Hylodidae. It is endemic to Brazil. Scientists know it exclusively from the type locality: Murici, in Alagoas. Its natural habitats are subtropical or tropical moist lowland forest and rivers. It is threatened by habitat loss.
