= Crossodactylus grandis =

Conservation status
- Data Deficient (IUCN 3.1)

Scientific classification
- Kingdom: Animalia
- Phylum: Chordata
- Class: Amphibia
- Order: Anura
- Family: Hylodidae
- Genus: Crossodactylus
- Species: C. grandis

Binomial name
- Crossodactylus grandis Lutz, 1951

Species of frog

Crossodactylus grandis, or the Bahia spinythumb frog, is a species of frog in the family Hylodidae. It is endemic to Brazil. Its natural habitats are subtropical or tropical high-altitude grassland and rivers. It is known solely from the Parque Nacional do Itatiaia in Minas Gerais in Brazil, where it lives in cloud forests. It is threatened by habitat loss.
