= Crossodactylus trachystomus =

Conservation status
- Data Deficient (IUCN 3.1)

Scientific classification
- Kingdom: Animalia
- Phylum: Chordata
- Class: Amphibia
- Order: Anura
- Family: Hylodidae
- Genus: Crossodactylus
- Species: C. trachystomus

Binomial name
- Crossodactylus trachystomus (Reinhardt and Lütken, 1862)

Synonyms
- Tarsopterus trachystomus Reinhardt and Lütken, 1862 "1861"; Crossodactylus bresslaui Müller, 1924; Crossodactylus bokermanni (Caramaschi & Sazima, 1985)

Species of frog

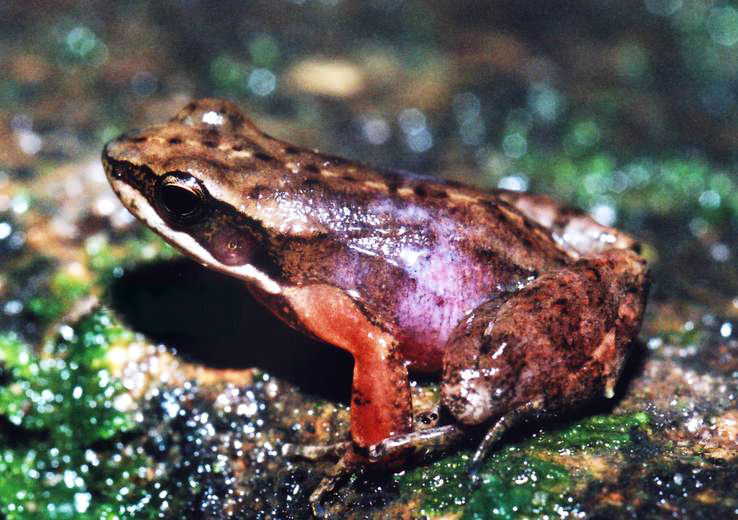

Crossodactylus trachystomus is a species of frog in the family Hylodidae. It is endemic to the Espinhaço Mountains in Minas Gerais, Brazil.

== Taxonomy ==
Until 2015 three Crossodactylus species were known from the Espinhaço Mountains: Crossodactylus trachystomus (not observed in the field since the mid-1980s), an undescribed species most similar to C. trachystomus, and Crossodactylus bokermanni described as a new species in 1985. Re-analysis of old samples and analysis of new samples could not show consistent differences between these taxa, for which Crossodactylus trachystomus is the valid name.

== Description ==
Males measure 8.7–25.1 mm (0.34–0.99 in) and females 20.5–27.5 mm (0.81–1.08 in) in snout–vent length. The body is slender, and the head is longer than wide. The canthus rostralis is sharp. The tympanum is distinct.

== Habitat and conservation ==
Crossodactylus trachystomus lives on the ground along permanent streams with sandy and rocky bottoms and bordered with grass and shrubs in montane savanna areas, and inside semideciduous Atlantic Forest. Breeding takes place in streams where males call exposed on stones or from sandy margins.

Habitat loss is occurring in the range of this species. It occurs in the Serra do Cipó National Park.
