= Crossodactylus cyclospinus =

Conservation status
- Data Deficient (IUCN 3.1)

Scientific classification
- Kingdom: Animalia
- Phylum: Chordata
- Class: Amphibia
- Order: Anura
- Family: Hylodidae
- Genus: Crossodactylus
- Species: C. cyclospinus

Binomial name
- Crossodactylus cyclospinus Nascimento, Cruz, and Feio, 2005

Species of frog

Crossodactylus cyclospinus is a species of frog in the family Hylodidae. It is endemic to Brazil and has been observed in two localities in Minas Gerais, both on the Jequitinhonha River.

== Original description ==
- Nascimento LB; Cruz CAG; Feio RN (2005). "A new species of diurnal frog in the genus Crossodactylus Dumeril and Bibron, 1841 (Anura, Leptodactylidae) from southeastern Brazil". Amphibia-Reptilia. 26: 497–505.
