= Hylodes charadranaetes =

Conservation status
- Least Concern (IUCN 3.1)

Scientific classification
- Kingdom: Animalia
- Phylum: Chordata
- Class: Amphibia
- Order: Anura
- Family: Hylodidae
- Genus: Hylodes
- Species: H. charadranaetes

Binomial name
- Hylodes charadranaetes Heyer & Cocroft, 1986

Species of frog

Hylodes charadranaetes, or the Rio tree toad, is a species of frog in the family Hylodidae. It is endemic to Brazil. Its natural habitats are subtropical or tropical moist lowland forest, subtropical or tropical moist montane forest, and rivers. It is threatened by habitat loss.
