= Hylodes perere =

Scientific classification
- Domain: Eukaryota
- Kingdom: Animalia
- Phylum: Chordata
- Class: Amphibia
- Order: Anura
- Family: Hylodidae
- Genus: Hylodes
- Species: H. perere

Binomial name
- Hylodes perere Silva and Benmaman, 2008

Species of frog

Hylodes perere is a species of frog in the family Hylodidae. It is endemic to Brazil and only known from Serra Negra, a part of Mantiqueira Mountains, in Santa Bárbara do Monte Verde, Minas Gerais state. The specific name perere (from Portuguese pererê) is derived from a character in Indian folklore who guards the forest, disrupting its silence with its whistles—in reference to the vocalizations of this species.

== Description ==
Males measure 23.4–27.1 mm (0.92–1.07 in) and females 23.9–28.4 mm (0.94–1.12 in) in snout–vent length. The snout is truncated in both dorsal and lateral views. The dorsum and dorsal portions of thighs are light olive-brown with dark blotches. There are dark stripes in the thighs.

Males are territorial and call in forest-covered stretches of streams, perched on rocks, branches, stream marginss, or partly submerged in the water. They both day and night; this is unusual as other Hylodes species call by daytime only.

== Habitat ==
The species has been collected by small streams at elevations of 1,200–1,500 m (3,900–4,900 ft) above sea level in a hilly area covered by seasonal semideciduous forests and dense montane forests.
