= Hylodes otavioi =

Conservation status
- Data Deficient (IUCN 3.1)

Scientific classification
- Kingdom: Animalia
- Phylum: Chordata
- Class: Amphibia
- Order: Anura
- Family: Hylodidae
- Genus: Hylodes
- Species: H. otavioi

Binomial name
- Hylodes otavioi Sazima & Bokermann, 1982

Species of frog

Hylodes otavioi, Otavio's stream frog, or the Otavio tree toad is a species of frog in the family Hylodidae.

It is endemic to Brazil. Scientists know it exclusively from the type locality: Serra do Cipó in Minas Gerais. Its natural habitats are subtropical or tropical moist montane forest and rivers. It is threatened by habitat loss.
