= Crossodactylus lutzorum =

Conservation status
- Data Deficient (IUCN 3.1)

Scientific classification
- Kingdom: Animalia
- Phylum: Chordata
- Class: Amphibia
- Order: Anura
- Family: Hylodidae
- Genus: Crossodactylus
- Species: C. lutzorum

Binomial name
- Crossodactylus lutzorum (Carcerelli & Caramaschi, 1993)

Species of frog

Crossodactylus lutzorum is a species of frog in the family Hylodidae. It is endemic to Brazil. Scientists know it exclusively from the type locality: Fazenda Água Branca in Bahia. Its natural habitats are subtropical or tropical moist lowland forest and rivers. It is threatened by habitat loss.
