= Crossodactylus schmidti =

Conservation status
- Near Threatened (IUCN 3.1)

Scientific classification
- Kingdom: Animalia
- Phylum: Chordata
- Class: Amphibia
- Order: Anura
- Family: Hylodidae
- Genus: Crossodactylus
- Species: C. schmidti

Binomial name
- Crossodactylus schmidti Gallardo, 1961

Species of frog

Crossodactylus schmidti or Schmidt's spinythumb frog is a species of frog in the family Hylodidae. It is found in Argentina, Brazil, and Paraguay. Its natural habitats are subtropical or tropical moist lowland forest and rivers. People have seen it between 300 and 750 meters above sea level. It is threatened by habitat loss.

It is named after Karl Patterson Schmidt, American herpetologist.
