= Hylodes lateristrigatus =

Conservation status
- Least Concern (IUCN 3.1)

Scientific classification
- Kingdom: Animalia
- Phylum: Chordata
- Class: Amphibia
- Order: Anura
- Family: Hylodidae
- Genus: Hylodes
- Species: H. lateristrigatus

Binomial name
- Hylodes lateristrigatus (Baumann, 1912)

Species of frog

Hylodes lateristrigatus is a species of frog in the family Hylodidae. It is endemic to Brazil. Its natural habitats are subtropical or tropical moist lowland forest, subtropical or tropical moist montane forest, and rivers. It is threatened by habitat loss.
