= Hylodes cardosoi =

Conservation status
- Least Concern (IUCN 3.1)

Scientific classification
- Kingdom: Animalia
- Phylum: Chordata
- Class: Amphibia
- Order: Anura
- Family: Hylodidae
- Genus: Hylodes
- Species: H. cardosoi

Binomial name
- Hylodes cardosoi Lingnau, Canedo, and Pombal, 2008

Species of frog

Hylodes cardosoi is a species of frog in the family Hylodidae. It is endemic to the state of São Paulo in Brazil.

The adult male frog measures 35.6–44.1 mm in snout-vent length and the adult female frog 36.7 mm to 46.5 mm. The skin of the dorsum is brown with some spots. The hind thighs legs are usually brown in color with lighter marks. The throat and ventrum are cream in color. This frog has oval disks on its toes. Unlike other frogs in its species group, it does not have dorsolateral stripes.

This frog lives in Atlantic forests in southern Brazil. They can be found near streams where the water moves quickly.

If the frog sees or hears danger, it will jump into the water but soon emerges.

Scientists named this frog for Dr. Adão José Cardoso, who studied animals in Brazil.
