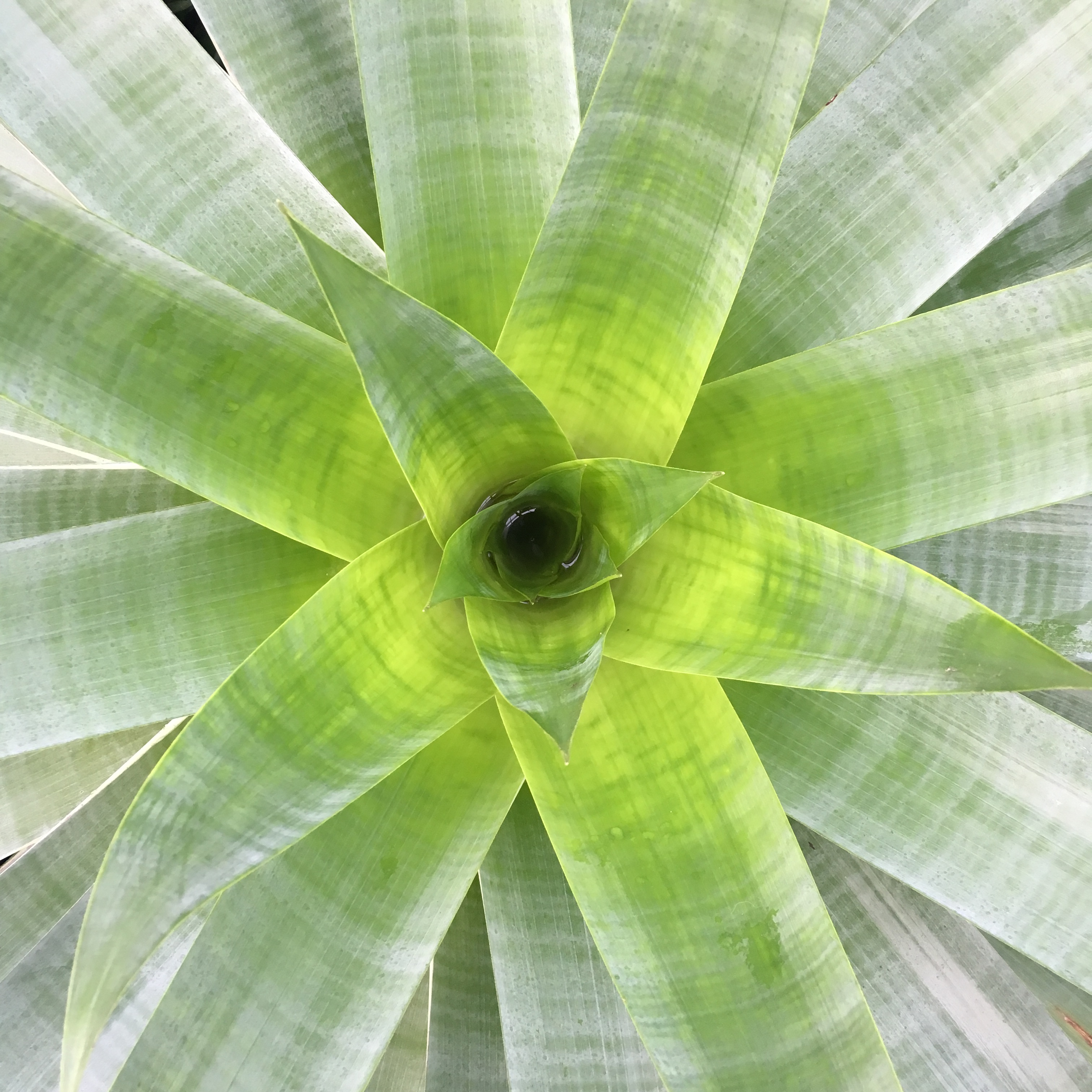
- Urn of Vriesea incurvata var. inflata

Scientific classification
- Kingdom: Plantae
- Clade: Tracheophytes
- Clade: Angiosperms
- Clade: Monocots
- Clade: Commelinids
- Order: Poales
- Family: Bromeliaceae
- Genus: Vriesea
- Species: V. incurvata

Binomial name
- Vriesea incurvata Gaudichaud

= Vriesea incurvata =

Species of flowering plant

Vriesea incurvata is a plant species in the genus Vriesea. This species is endemic to Brazil.

== Cultivars ==
- Vriesea 'Albertii'
- Vriesea 'California Orange'
- Vriesea 'Eclatant'
- Vriesea 'Flammeche'
- Vriesea 'Fulgida'
- Vriesea 'Gloriosa'
- Vriesea 'L'eclatant'
- Vriesea 'Marcella'
- Vriesea 'Marechaliana'
- Vriesea 'Margaritae'
- Vriesea 'President Oscar Lamarche'
- Vriesea 'Rostrum Aquilae'
- Vriesea 'Seminole Chief'
- Vriesea 'Souvenir de Joseph Mawet'
- Vriesea 'Splendida'
- Vriesea 'Van Geertii'
- × Guzvriesea 'Elata'
