= Crossodactylus timbuhy =

Scientific classification
- Kingdom: Animalia
- Phylum: Chordata
- Class: Amphibia
- Order: Anura
- Family: Hylodidae
- Genus: Crossodactylus
- Species: C. timbuhy

Binomial name
- Crossodactylus timbuhy Pimenta, Cruz, and Caramaschi, 2014

Species of frog

Crossodactylus timbuhy is a species of frog in the family Hylodidae. It is endemic to Brazil. It has been observed near Santa Teresa in Espírito Santo.

== Original description ==
- Pimenta BVS; Cruz CAG; Caramaschi U (2014). "Taxonomic review of the species complex of Crossodactylus dispar A. Lutz, 1925 (Anura, Hylodidae)". Arquivos de Zoologia Mus Zool Univ Sao Paulo (Abstract and references). 45: 1–33. doi:10.11606/issn.2176-7793.v45i1p1-33.
