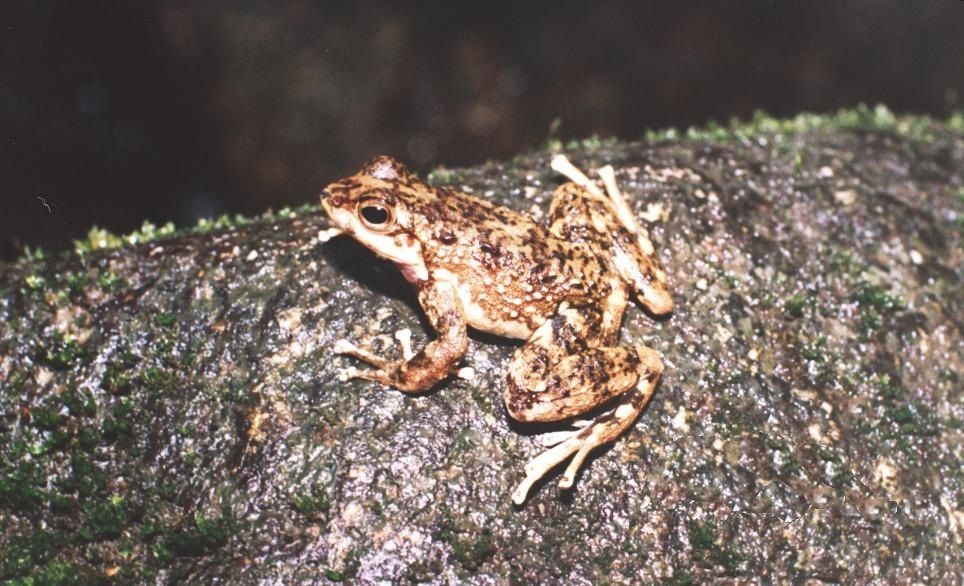

Conservation status
- Least Concern (IUCN 3.1)

Scientific classification
- Kingdom: Animalia
- Phylum: Chordata
- Class: Amphibia
- Order: Anura
- Family: Hylodidae
- Genus: Hylodes
- Species: H. asper

Binomial name
- Hylodes asper (Müller, 1924)

Synonyms
- Elosia aspera Müller, 1924; Hylodes aspera (Müller, 1924)

= Hylodes asper =

Species of amphibian

Hylodes asper, the warty tree toad or Brazilian torrent frog, is a species of frogs in the family Hylodidae. It is endemic to the Rio de Janeiro and São Paulo states in southeastern Brazil. Living in a high-noise environment, the species uses "semaphoring" to supplement acoustic signalling.

== Behaviour ==
Hylodes asper are diurnal. Males use both visual and acoustic signalling to attract females and to maintain their territories. "Foot-flagging" is the most distinctive visual display, usually performed while calling. In foot-flagging, the raises one hind limb and extends it up and back, exposing the silvery colour of the dorsal surfaces of toes and toe fringes.

Male Hylodes asper have been observed to construct an underwater chamber, apparently for use as a nest for reproduction.

== Habitat and conservation ==
This frog has been observed as high as 800 meters above sea level. The species' natural habitats are larger forest streams and small forest rivers in primary and old secondary forests. Active by day, it can be found on rocks and low vegetation along the streams.

Hylodes asper is patchily distributed but where it occurs it can be common. Declines have been reported for some sites. The most important but still local and minor threats to this species urban development and land use change.
