= Hylodes uai =

Conservation status
- Data Deficient (IUCN 3.1)

Scientific classification
- Kingdom: Animalia
- Phylum: Chordata
- Class: Amphibia
- Order: Anura
- Family: Hylodidae
- Genus: Hylodes
- Species: H. uai

Binomial name
- Hylodes uai Nascimento, Pombal, and Haddad, 2001

Species of frog

Hylodes uai is a species of frog in the family Hylodidae. It is endemic to the Espinhaço Mountains in the Minas Gerais state, Brazil, where it is known from the Mangabeiras Park in Belo Horizonte, and another location on the southern end of the Espinhaço Mountains. It is the most-inland species of the genus.

== Etymology ==
The specific name uai is a common interjection of surprise and astonishment used by the people from Minas Gerais.

== Description ==
Males measure 31–34 mm (1.2–1.3 in) and females 36–38 mm (1.4–1.5 in) in snout–vent length. Body is moderately slender; head is longer than wide, and snout is round in dorsal view and protruding in lateral view. Dorsum and limbs are dark brown with small irregular dots brown and black. There is a silver creamish stripe running from below eye and tympanum to shoulder, and light brown lateral fold from posterior corner of the eye to the groin. Iris is copper coloured.

== Reproduction ==
Male advertisement calls consist of four whistle notes or three to four whistles plus a squeaky note. Calls are given sporadically but throughout the year. Males call from shaded places on rocks or rock crevices and appear territorial.

Tadpoles develop in small rivers and are most commonly found under stones. Young tadpoles have been collected throughout year, suggesting that reproductive activity is continuous and prolonged. Largest tadpoles measure 26 mm (1.0 in) in body length and 77 mm (3.0 in) in total length.

== Habitat and conservation ==
The species' natural habitat is the margins of small streams in secondary gallery forest. They are active by day.

Hylodes uai is a common species within its small known range but potentially threatened by habitat loss.
