= Hylodes vanzolinii =

Conservation status
- Data Deficient (IUCN 3.1)

Scientific classification
- Kingdom: Animalia
- Phylum: Chordata
- Class: Amphibia
- Order: Anura
- Family: Hylodidae
- Genus: Hylodes
- Species: H. vanzolinii

Binomial name
- Hylodes vanzolinii Heyer, 1982

Species of amphibian

Hylodes vanzolinii is a species of frog in the family Hylodidae.

== Geographic range ==
H. vanzolinii is endemic to Brazil and only known from its type locality, Caparaó National Park in the Minas Gerais state.

== Habitat ==
The natural habitat of H. vanzolinii is open high-altitude grassland near streams.

== Conservation status ==
The main threats to H. vanzolinii are habitat loss, caused by fires, and tourism.

== Etymology ==
The specific name vanzolinii honors Paulo Vanzolini, a Brazilian herpetologist and composer.
