= Hylodes mertensi =

Conservation status
- Data Deficient (IUCN 3.1)

Scientific classification
- Kingdom: Animalia
- Phylum: Chordata
- Class: Amphibia
- Order: Anura
- Family: Hylodidae
- Genus: Hylodes
- Species: H. mertensi

Binomial name
- Hylodes mertensi (Bokermann, 1956)

Species of frog

Hylodes mertensi or Merten's tree toad is a species of frog in the family Hylodidae. It is endemic to Brazil. Its natural habitats are subtropical or tropical moist lowland forest and rivers. It is threatened by habitat loss.
