= Hylodes babax =

Conservation status
- Near Threatened (IUCN 3.1)

Scientific classification
- Kingdom: Animalia
- Phylum: Chordata
- Class: Amphibia
- Order: Anura
- Family: Hylodidae
- Genus: Hylodes
- Species: H. babax

Binomial name
- Hylodes babax Heyer, 1982

Species of frog

Hylodes babax or the Caparao Mountains tree toad is a species of frog in the family Hylodidae. It is endemic to Brazil.

Its natural habitats are subtropical or tropical moist montane forest and rivers. It has been observed in montane habitats in the states of Espiritu Santo and Minas Gerais.
