= Crossodactylus werneri =

Scientific classification
- Kingdom: Animalia
- Phylum: Chordata
- Class: Amphibia
- Order: Anura
- Family: Hylodidae
- Genus: Crossodactylus
- Species: C. werneri

Binomial name
- Crossodactylus werneri Pimenta, Cruz, and Caramaschi, 2014

Species of frog

Crossodactylus werneri is a species of frog in the family Hylodidae. It is endemic to Brazil. It has been observed in parts of Serra da Mantiqueira stretching through Minas Gerais, Rio de Janeiro, and São Paulo.

== Scientific description ==
- Pimenta BVS; Cruz CAG; Caramaschi U (2014). "Taxonomic review of the species complex of Crossodactylus dispar A. Lutz, 1925 (Anura, Hylodidae)". Arquivos de Zoologia Mus Zool Univ Sao Paulo (Abstract and references). 45: 1–33. doi:10.11606/issn.2176-7793.v45i1p1-33.
