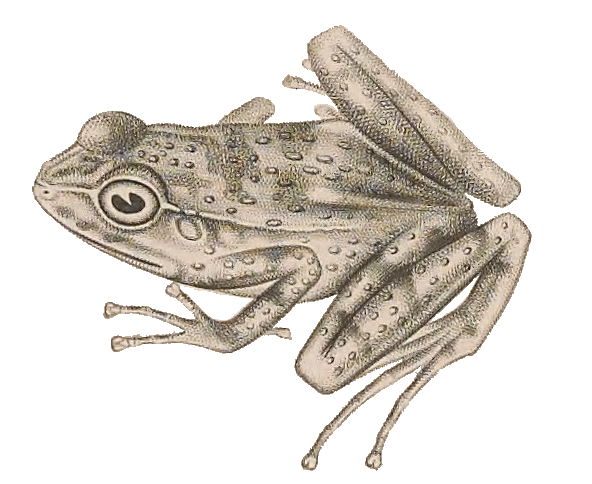

Conservation status
- Least Concern (IUCN 3.1)

Scientific classification
- Kingdom: Animalia
- Phylum: Chordata
- Class: Amphibia
- Order: Anura
- Family: Hylodidae
- Genus: Crossodactylus
- Species: C. gaudichaudii

Binomial name
- Crossodactylus gaudichaudii A.M.C. Duméril & Bibron, 1841

= Crossodactylus gaudichaudii =

Species of frog

Crossodactylus gaudichaudii is a species of frog in the family Hylodidae. The species is endemic to Brazil.

== Etymology ==
The specific name, gaudichaudii, is in honor of French botanist Charles Gaudichaud-Beaupré.

== Geographic range ==
C. gaudichaudii is found in the Brazilian states of Rio de Janeiro and São Paulo.

== Habitat ==
The natural habitats of C. gaudichaudii are subtropical or tropical moist lowland forest, subtropical or tropical moist montane forest, and rivers, at altitudes from sea level to 1,800 m (5,900 ft).

== Conservation status ==
C. gaudichaudi is threatened by habitat loss.
