= Hylodes ornatus =

Conservation status
- Least Concern (IUCN 3.1)

Scientific classification
- Kingdom: Animalia
- Phylum: Chordata
- Class: Amphibia
- Order: Anura
- Family: Hylodidae
- Genus: Hylodes
- Species: H. ornatus

Binomial name
- Hylodes ornatus (Bokermann, 1967)

Species of frog

Hylodes ornatus or the ornate tree toad is a species of frog in the family Hylodidae. It is endemic to Brazil. Scientists know it from the type locality, Parque Nacional do Itatiaia in the state of Rio de Janeiro. Its natural habitats are subtropical or tropical moist lowland forest, subtropical or tropical moist montane forest, and rivers. It is threatened by habitat loss.
