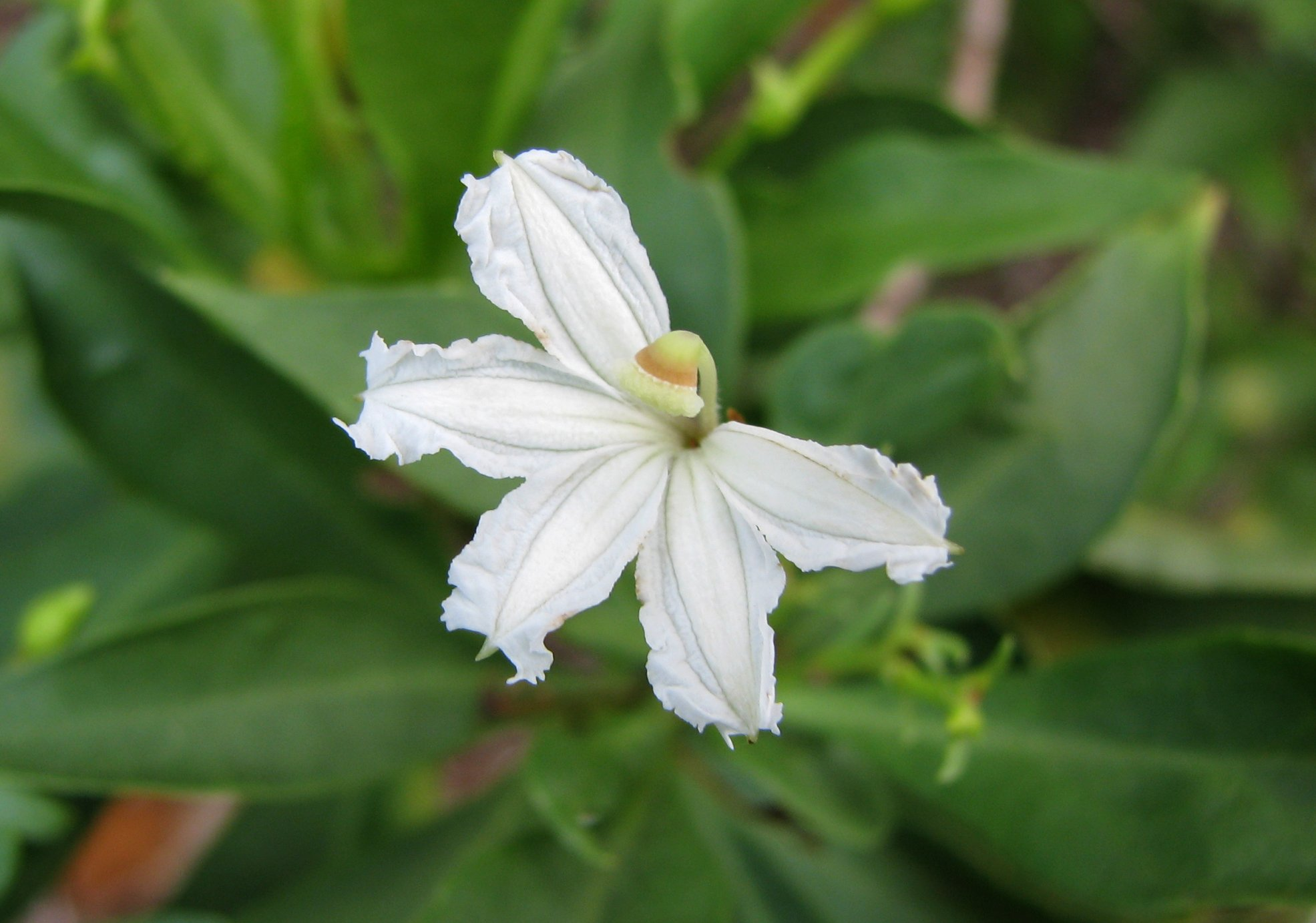

Scientific classification
- Kingdom: Plantae
- Clade: Tracheophytes
- Clade: Angiosperms
- Clade: Eudicots
- Clade: Asterids
- Order: Asterales
- Family: Goodeniaceae
- Genus: Scaevola
- Species: S. gaudichaudiana

Binomial name
- Scaevola gaudichaudiana Cham.

Synonyms
- Scaevola ciliata G.Don; Scaevola kahanae O.Deg. Scaevola ligustrifolia Nutt. Scaevola pubescens Nutt. Scaevola skottsbergii H.St.John; Temminckia ciliata (G.Don) de Vriese

= Scaevola gaudichaudiana =

Species of shrub

Scaevola gaudichaudiana, the mountain naupaka, is a perennial shrub in the family Goodeniaceae. The plant is endemic to Hawaii.

It was first described by Adelbert von Chamisso in 1832 in the journal Linnaea and was given the specific epithet, gaudichaudiana, to honour Charles Gaudichaud-Beaupré.

== Description ==
Scaevola gaudichaudiana flowers all year round and its flowers are fragrant, white, and tubular. Flowering is followed by small purple fruits. The margins of the leaves are toothed.

It grows in wet forest and open areas from about altitudes of 555 feet (169 m) to over 2,600 feet (790 m).
