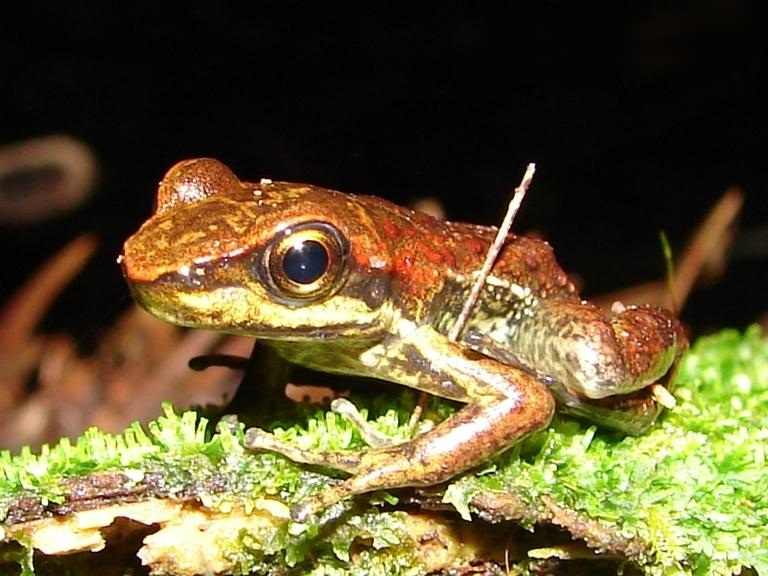
- Hylodes meridionalis

Scientific classification
- Kingdom: Animalia
- Phylum: Chordata
- Class: Amphibia
- Order: Anura
- Family: Hylodidae
- Genus: Hylodes; Fitzinger, 1826

Diversity
- See text

= Hylodes =

Genus of amphibians

Hylodes is a genus of frogs in the family Hylodidae. The genus may be paraphyletic with respect to Megaelosia. The genus Hylodes is endemic to southeastern Brazil. Member species are also known commonly as the tree toads, or more ambiguously, as torrent frogs. They are diurnal and usually inhabit shallow mountain streams.

== Species ==
The following species are recognised as being valid in the genus Hylodes:

- Hylodes amnicola Pombal, Feio & Haddad, 2002
- Hylodes asper (L. Müller, 1924)
- Hylodes babax Heyer, 1982
- Hylodes caete Malagoli, Sá, Canedo & Haddad, 2017
- Hylodes cardosoi Lingnau, Canedo & Pombal, 2008
- Hylodes charadranaetes Heyer & Cocroft, 1986
- Hylodes dactylocinus Pavan, Narvaes & Rodrigues, 2001
- Hylodes fredi Canedo & Pombal, 2007
- Hylodes glaber (Miranda-Ribeiro, 1926)
- Hylodes heyeri Haddad, Pombal & Bastos, 1996
- Hylodes japi Sá, Canedo, Lyra & Haddad, 2015
- Hylodes lateristrigatus (Baumann, 1912)
- Hylodes magalhaesi (Bokermann, 1964)
- Hylodes meridionalis (Mertens, 1927)
- Hylodes mertensi (Bokermann, 1956)
- Hylodes nasus (Lichtenstein, 1823)
- Hylodes ornatus (Bokermann, 1967)
- Hylodes otavioi Sazima & Bokermann, 1983
- Hylodes perere Silva & Benmaman, 2008
- Hylodes perplicatus (Miranda-Ribeiro, 1926)
- Hylodes phyllodes Heyer & Cocroft, 1986
- Hylodes pipilans Canedo & Pombal, 2007
- Hylodes regius Gouvêa, 1979
- Hylodes sazimai Haddad & Pombal, 1995
- Hylodes uai Nascimento, Pombal & Haddad, 2001
- Hylodes vanzolinii Heyer, 1982

Nota bene: A binomial authority in parentheses indicates that the species was originally described in a genus other than Hylodes.
