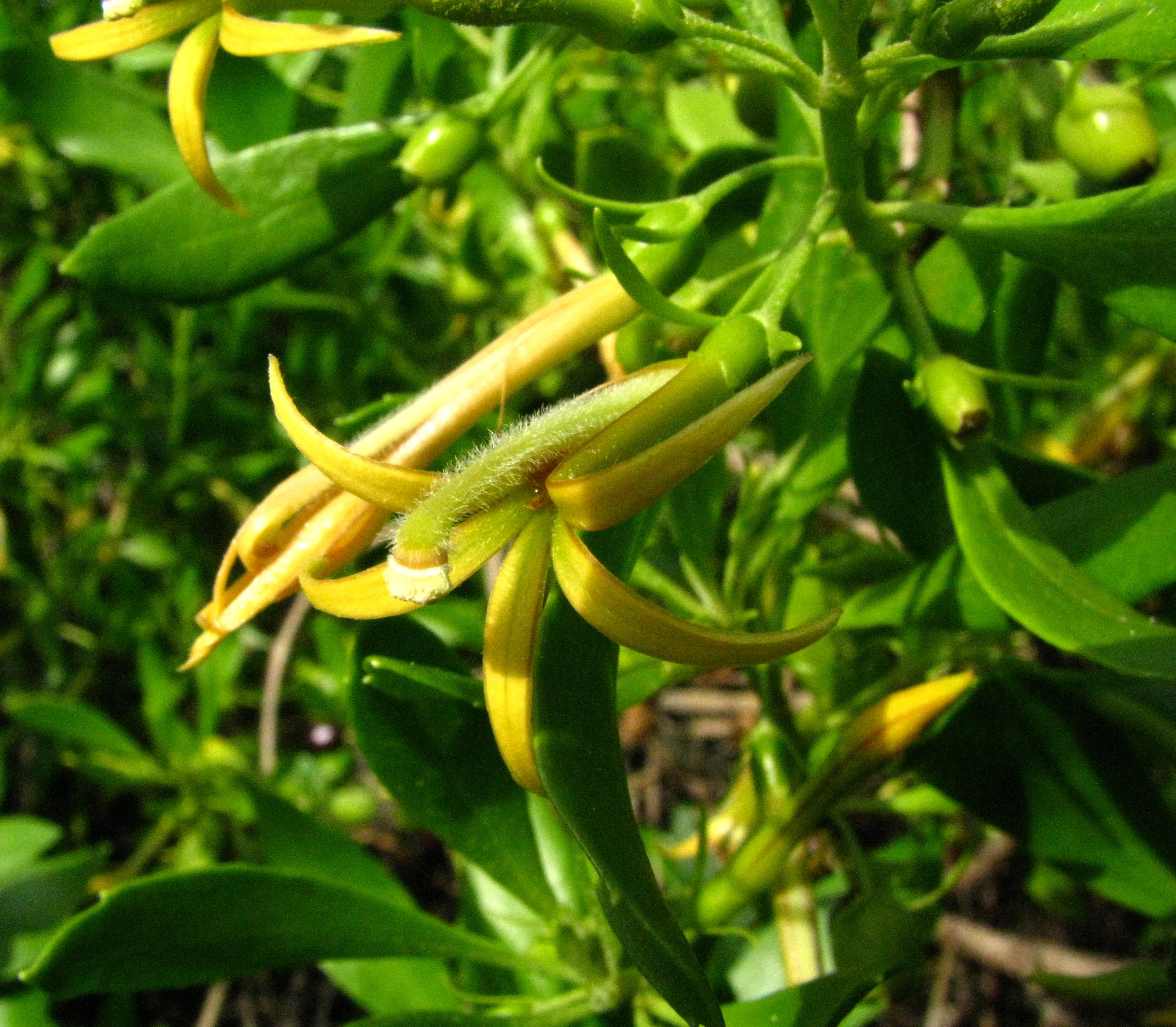

Conservation status
- Imperiled (NatureServe)

Scientific classification
- Kingdom: Plantae
- Clade: Tracheophytes
- Clade: Angiosperms
- Clade: Eudicots
- Clade: Asterids
- Order: Asterales
- Family: Goodeniaceae
- Genus: Scaevola
- Species: S. gaudichaudii

Binomial name
- Scaevola gaudichaudii Hook. & Arn.

Synonyms
- Lobelia gaudichaudii Kuntze; Scaevola menziesiana Cham.; Scaevola montana Gaudich.; Scaevola swezeyana Rock; Temminckia menziesiana (Cham.) de Vriese

= Scaevola gaudichaudii =

Species of shrub

Scaevola gaudichaudii, the ridgetop naupaka, is a yellow-flowered shrub in the family Goodeniaceae endemic to Hawaii. Like other Scaevola called mountain or ridgetop naupaka, this species is commonly called naupaka kuahiwi in Hawaiian. It was first described by William J. Hooker and George Arnott Walker-Arnott in 1832 in the Botany of Captain Beechey's Voyage... and was given the specific epithet, gaudichaudii, to honour Charles Gaudichaud-Beaupré.

== Description ==
It grows to a height of 6 feet (1.8 m), spreading to a diameter of 8 feet (2.4 m) and has a life span of about five years. Scaevola gaudichaudii likes full sun and harsh, dry, and windy locations. The plant is well known for producing very distinct half-flowers. It flowers year round with weakly fragrant blossoms that vary in colour from dark yellow, brownish-yellow to pinkish. The drupes are small and purple, and the seeds are about 5.6 mm in length. The leaves are from 1 inch (2.5 cm) to 2 inches (5.1 cm) long and are slightly toothed.

== Distribution and habitat ==
Scaevola gaudichaudii is endemic to the Hawaiian Islands and can be found on Kauaʻi, Oʻahu, Molokaʻi, Lanaʻi, Maui, and Hawaiʻi Island. It flourishes in dry to mesic forests, which sets it apart from other mountain naupaka that tend to inhabit damper areas at higher altitudes.

== Human use ==
Flowers of Scaevola gaudichaudii are somewhat fragrant and incorporated into lei. The fruits produced by the plant were used by early Hawaiians to make a purplish black dye. This purple dye was used in the making of kapa.

== Cultural significance ==
Scaevola gaudichaudii, and the handful of other ridgetop or mountain naupaka, are included in Hawaiian moʻolelo. The plantsʻs story has many variations, but the main points entail a young man and woman falling in love only to become separated. The flowers are representations of the lovers, with the joining of the two halves from seaside naupaka and mountaintop naupaka being representative of their reunion.

== Conservation status ==
In regards to its endangerment, Scaevola gaudichaudii is currently ranked as imperiled or under G2 status by NatureServe. The plant is known for being resistant to pests, but can be easily overwhelmed by ant infestations, which attract scale bugs, aphids, and other insects that suck away at its nutrients.
