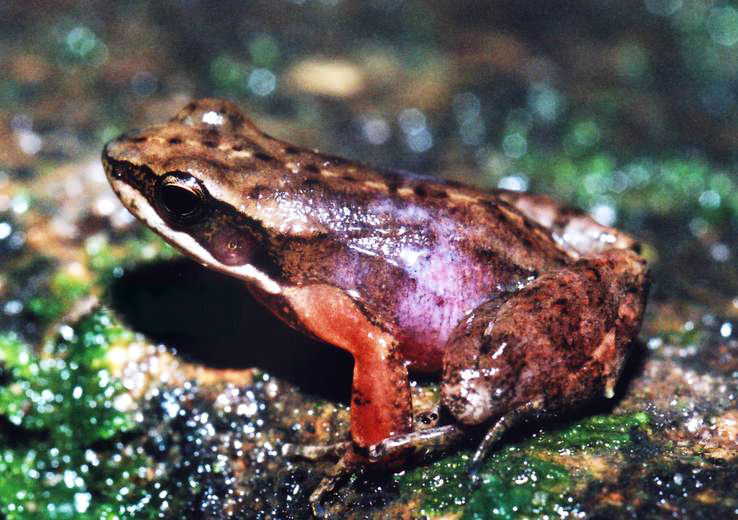
- An unidentified Crossodactylus species

Scientific classification
- Kingdom: Animalia
- Phylum: Chordata
- Class: Amphibia
- Order: Anura
- Family: Hylodidae
- Genus: Crossodactylus; Duméril and Bibron, 1841

Type species
- Crossodactylus gaudichaudii Duméril and Bibron, 1841

Species
- 14 species (see text)

= Crossodactylus =

Genus of amphibians

Crossodactylus is a genus of frogs in the family Hylodidae. The genus occurs in Brazil, southern Paraguay, and northern Argentina. These frogs are sometimes known as Limnocharis, Tarsopterus, Calamobates, and by the common name spinythumb frogs. They typically inhabit streams in mountainous areas in the Atlantic Forest or in montane savanna.

== Species ==
There are 14 species:

- Crossodactylus aeneus J. Müller, 1924
- Crossodactylus boulengeri (de Witte, 1930)
- Crossodactylus caramaschii Bastos & Pombal, 1995
- Crossodactylus cyclospinus Nascimento, Cruz & Feio, 2005
- Crossodactylus dantei Carcerelli & Caramaschi, 1993
- Crossodactylus dispar A. Lutz, 1925
- Crossodactylus franciscanus Pimenta, Caramaschi & Cruz, 2015
- Crossodactylus gaudichaudii A.M.C. Duméril & Bibron, 1841
- Crossodactylus grandis B. Lutz, 1951
- Crossodactylus lutzorum Carcerelli & Caramaschi, 1993
- Crossodactylus schmidti Gallardo, 1961
- Crossodactylus timbuhy Pimenta, Cruz & Caramaschi, 2014
- Crossodactylus trachystomus (Reinhardt & Lütken, 1862)
- Crossodactylus werneri Pimenta, Cruz & Caramaschi, 2014
