= Crossodactylus dispar =

Conservation status
- Data Deficient (IUCN 3.1)

Scientific classification
- Kingdom: Animalia
- Phylum: Chordata
- Class: Amphibia
- Order: Anura
- Family: Hylodidae
- Genus: Crossodactylus
- Species: C. dispar

Binomial name
- Crossodactylus dispar Lutz, 1925

Synonyms
- Crossodactylus fuscigula A. Lutz, 1930

Species of frog

Crossodactylus dispar is a species of frog in the family Hylodidae. It is endemic to Brazil. Its natural habitats are subtropical or tropical moist lowland forest, subtropical or tropical moist montane forest, and rivers. It is threatened by habitat loss.
