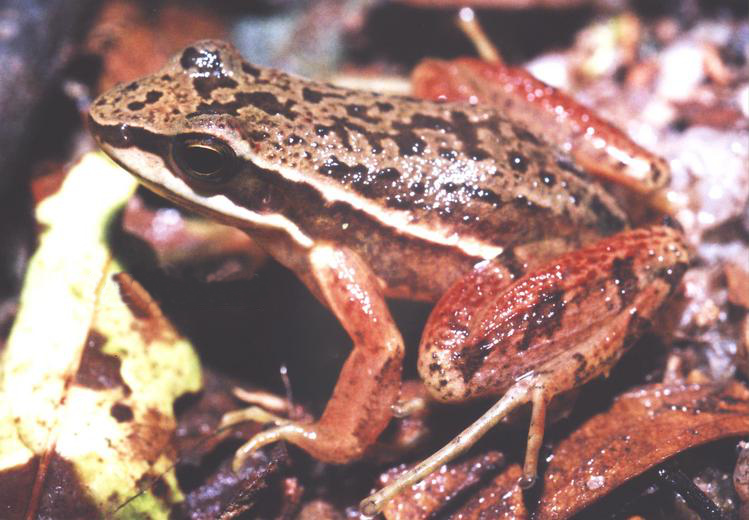

Conservation status
- Data Deficient (IUCN 3.1)

Scientific classification
- Kingdom: Animalia
- Phylum: Chordata
- Class: Amphibia
- Order: Anura
- Family: Hylodidae
- Genus: Hylodes
- Species: H. sazimai

Binomial name
- Hylodes sazimai Haddad & Pombal, 1995

= Hylodes sazimai =

Species of frog

Hylodes sazimai is a species of frog in the family Hylodidae. It is endemic to Brazil. Its natural habitats are subtropical or tropical moist lowland forest, subtropical or tropical moist montane forest, and rivers. It is threatened by habitat loss.

The adult male measures 27.1–28.5 mm in snout-vent length. The skin of the dorsum is brown in color, and the legs are red-brown with darker bars. The front legs are reddish with spots. There are lighter stripes on the frog's sides, reaching from the eye to the groin. There are white stripes running parallel to these stripes. The mouth is dark and the belly is white.

== Original description ==
- Haddad, C.F.B.; Pombal Jr, J.P. (1995). "A new species of Hylodes from southeastern Brazil (Amphibia: Leptodactylidae)". Herpetologica (Abstract and preview): 279–286.
