= Hylodes amnicola =

Conservation status
- Data Deficient (IUCN 3.1)

Scientific classification
- Kingdom: Animalia
- Phylum: Chordata
- Class: Amphibia
- Order: Anura
- Family: Hylodidae
- Genus: Hylodes
- Species: H. amnicola

Binomial name
- Hylodes amnicola Pombal, Feio, and Haddad, 2002

Species of amphibian

Hylodes amnicola is a species of frog in the family Hylodidae. It is endemic to Minas Gerais in Brazil. It has been observed 1400 meters above sea level.

The adult male frog measures 25.3–28.1 mm long in snout-vent length. The skin of the dorsum can be brown or gray in color, with stripes and marks. The skin of the ventrum is white in color.
