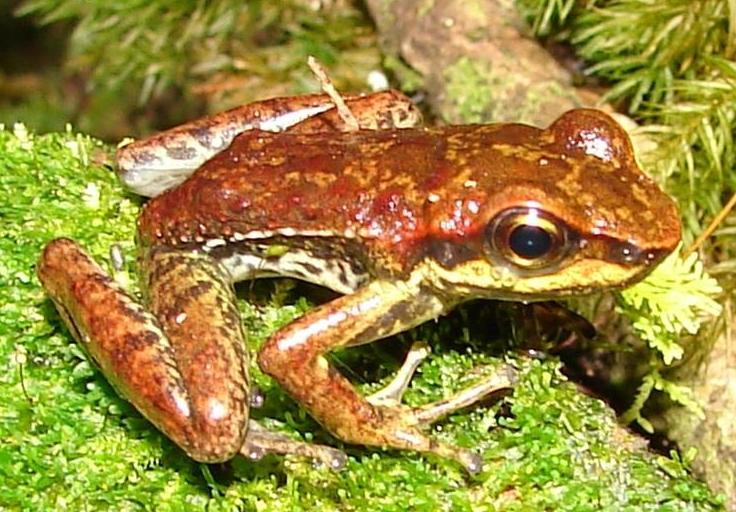

Conservation status
- Least Concern (IUCN 3.1)

Scientific classification
- Kingdom: Animalia
- Phylum: Chordata
- Class: Amphibia
- Order: Anura
- Family: Hylodidae
- Genus: Hylodes
- Species: H. meridionalis

Binomial name
- Hylodes meridionalis (Mertens, 1927)

= Hylodes meridionalis =

Species of frog

Hylodes meridionalis, also known as the Rio Grande tree toad, is a species of frog in the family Hylodidae. It is endemic to Brazil, in the states of Rio Grande do Sul and Santa Catarina. Its natural habitats are subtropical or tropical moist lowland forest and rivers. It is threatened by habitat loss stemming from deforestation, pine and banana plantations, and water pollution, as well as infection from the amphibian chytrid fungus, Batrachochytrium dendrobatidis.
