= Santa Bárbara do Monte Verde =

- Municipality
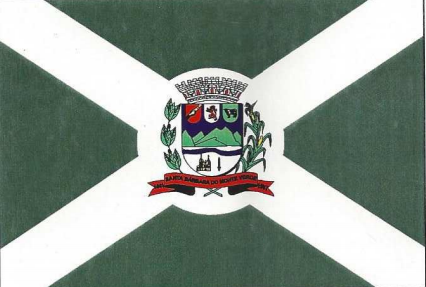
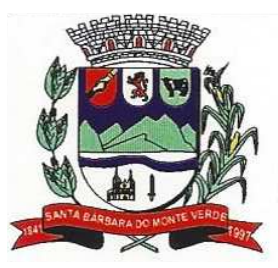
- Flag Coat of arms

- Location in Brazil
- Coordinates: 21°57′32″S 43°42′7″W
- Country: Brazil
- Region: Southeast
- State: Minas Gerais
- Mesoregion: Vale do Rio Doce

Population (2020)
  - Total: 3,182
- Time zone: UTC−3 (BRT)

Santa Bárbara do Monte Verde is a municipality in the state of Minas Gerais in the Southeast region of Brazil.

== See also ==
- List of municipalities in Minas Gerais
