= Charles Gaudichaud-Beaupré =

French botanist (1789–1854)

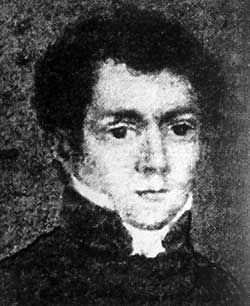
- Born: 4 September 1789; Angoulème, France
- Died: 16 January 1854 (aged 64); Paris
- Education: Cognac, Angoulême
- Known for: Collection of specimens
- Parent(s): J.-J. Gaudichaud and Rose (Mallat) Gaudichaud
- Scientific career
- Fields: Botany
- Author abbrev. (botany): Gaudich.

Charles Gaudichaud-Beaupré (French pronunciation: [ʃaʁl ɡodiʃo bopʁe]; September 4, 1789 – January 16, 1854) was a French botanist.

== Biography ==
Gaudichaud was born in Angoulême, to J-J. Gaudichaud and Rose (Mallat) Gaudichaud. He studied pharmacology informally at Cognac and Angoulême, and then under Robiquet in Paris, where he acquired a knowledge of botany from Desfontaines and Louis Richard. In April 1810, he was appointed pharmacist in the military marine, and from July 1811 to the end of 1814, he served in Antwerp. He also studied chemistry and herbology.

His greatest claim to fame was serving as botanist on a circumglobal expedition from 1817 to 1820. He accompanied Freycinet, who made the expedition on the ships Uranie and Physicienne. The wreck of the Uranie in the Falkland Islands, at the close of 1819, deprived him of more than half the botanical collections he had made in various parts of the world. He is also known for his collections in Australia.

In 1831, Gaudichaud sailed on L'Herminie to South America, visiting Chile, Brazil and Peru. In 1836, he undertook a third voyage, circumnavigating the globe on La Bonite.

He died in Paris.

== Legacy ==
Gaudichaud is commemorated in the scientific names of two species of South American lizards, Ecpleopus gaudichaudii and Garthia gaudichaudii (the Chilean marked gecko), and one species of Brazilian frog, Crossodactylus gaudichaudii. Two Hawaiian species of flowering plants, in the genus Scaevola are named after him, Scaevola gaudichaudiana and Scaevola gaudichaudii. Also, a genus of South American plants in the family Malpighiaceae, Gaudichaudia, is named after Gaudichaud.

He wrote various treatises, with memoirs on potato blight, the multiplication of bulbous plants, the increase in diameter of dicotyledonous plants, and other subjects.

== Principal works ==
- Flore des îles Malouines (Flora of the Falkland Islands)
- Mémoire sur les Cycadées (Treatise on the Cycads)
- Voyage de l'Uranie (Voyage of the Uranus)
- Lettre sur l'organographie et la physiologie, addressed to Monsieur de Mirbel, in Archives de Botanique, T. II, 1833 (Letter on Oceanography and Physiology)
- Recherches générales sur l'organographie (General Research on Oceanography)
- Mémoire sur le Cissus hydrophora (Treatise on Cissus hydrophora)
- Voyage Autour du Monde Executé pendant les années 1836 et 1837 sur la corvette La Bonite (Voyage of the Bonita) and illustrated plates
- Notes relatives à l'organographie et à la physiologie des végétaux monocotylés
