= Megaelosia =

Rio big-tooth frog

Conservation status
- Least Concern (IUCN 3.1)

Scientific classification
- Kingdom: Animalia
- Phylum: Chordata
- Class: Amphibia
- Order: Anura
- Family: Hylodidae
- Genus: Megaelosia; Miranda-Ribeiro, 1923
- Species: M. goeldii

Binomial name
- Megaelosia goeldii (Baumann, 1912)

Synonyms
- Hylodes goeldii Baumann, 1912

Species of frog

Megaelosia goeldii, also known as the Rio big-tooth frog, is a species of frog in the family Hylodidae. It is the only member of the genus Megaelosia. It is endemic to Southeast Brazil and occurs in São Paulo and Rio de Janeiro states. It is named after Émil Goeldi, a Swiss zoologist who worked in Brazil.

== Taxonomy ==
The genus Megaelosia formerly contained several other species, but all of these were reclassified in a new genus, Phantasmarana, in 2021 based on a phylogenetic study, leaving M. goeldii as the only remaining member of Megaelosia.

== Description ==
Males measure 82–95 mm (3.2–3.7 in) and females 85–97 mm (3.3–3.8 in) in snout–vent length (based on 2 males and 3 females only). The dorsolateral skin is granular. The snout is subacuminate in dorsal view and protruding in profile. The canthus rostralis is evident and straight. Males have neither vocal sacs nor vocal slits.

== Diet ==
Stomach contents have been found to contain insects (cockroaches, Coleoptera, lepidopteran caterpillars), earthworms, and plant material. In experiments, Megaelosia goeldii have consumed other frogs.

== Habitat and conservation ==
Its natural habitats are rivers in primary forest. During the day, they can be found on emergent rocks in shallow places. Tadpoles have been collected under large rocks in a moderate-sized forest stream.

Megaelosia goeldii is a common species, but very difficult to catch. It is threatened by habitat loss caused by forest clearance and infrastructure development, and by pollution.
