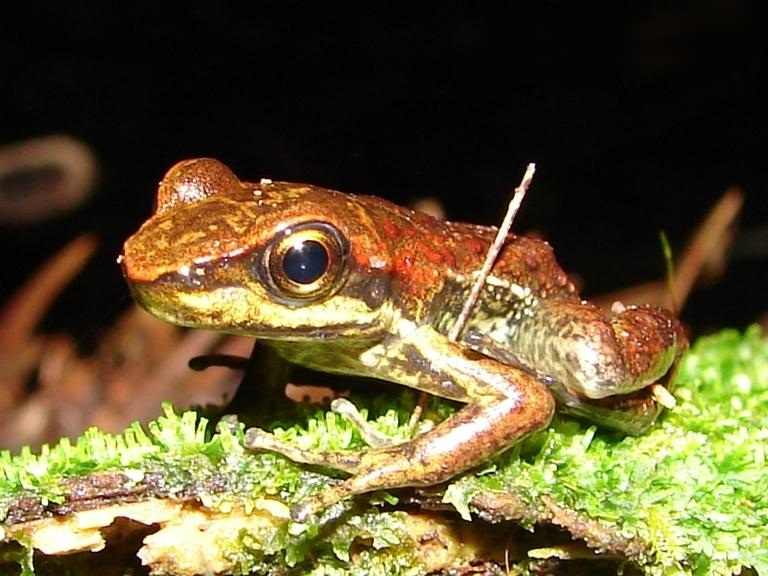
- Hylodes meridionalis

Scientific classification
- Kingdom: Animalia
- Phylum: Chordata
- Class: Amphibia
- Order: Anura
- Superfamily: Hyloidea
- Family: Hylodidae; Günther, 1858

Type genus
- Hylodes Fitzinger, 1826

= Hylodidae =

Family of amphibians

Hylodidae, commonly known as giant Neotropical torrent frogs, is a family of frogs native to Brazil and northern Argentina. Phylogenetic evidence suggests the Hylodidae being the sister group to the Alsodidae.

Megaelosia goeldii is one species that lost the ability to produce vocalizations which in turn is denoted as mute. Through observation of aggressive interactions, it was found that the species' vocal sacs are used for one form of its visual signaling and communication.

== Diversity ==
The family contains 48 species in four genera:

- Crossodactylus A.M.C. Duméril & Bibron, 1841 (13 species)
- Hylodes Fitzinger, 1826 (26 species)
- Megaelosia Miranda-Ribeiro, 1923 (one species)
- Phantasmarana Vittorazzi, Augusto-Alves, Neves-da-Silva, Carvalho-e-Silva, Recco-Pimentel, Toledo, Lourenço & Bruschi, 2021 (eight species)
