= List of animals referred to as white-lipped =

The descriptive term white-lipped is part of the common name of a number of different animal species:

- Brown white-lipped python or Leiopython, a nonvenomous snake species, L. albertisii, found in New Guinea
- Feijo white lipped frog (Hydrolaetare dantasi), a species of frog in the family Leptodactylidae
- Galam white-lipped frog (Hylarana galamensis), a species of frog in the family Ranidae
- Loreto white-lipped frog (Leptodactylus rhodomystax), a species of frog in the family Leptodactylidae
- Mexican white-lipped frog (Leptodactylus fragilis), a species of leptodactylid frog in Texas, Mexico, Central America, Colombia and Venezuela
- Northern white-lipped pitviper (Trimeresurus albolabris septentrionalis), a venomous snake subspecies found in Nepal and India
- Wandolleck's white-lipped tree frog (Litoria albolabris), a species of frog in the family Hylidae
- White-lipped bamboo viper (Trimeresurus albolabris), a venomous snake species found in Southeast Asia
- White-lipped bandicoot or Clara's echymipera (Echymipera clara), a species of marsupial in the family Peramelidae
- White-lipped bright-eyed frog (Boophis albilabris), a species of frog in the family Mantellidae
- White-lipped chameleon (Furcifer minor) or Minor's chameleon, a species of lizard in the family Chamaeleonidae
- White-lipped deer or Thorold's deer (Cervus albirostris), a threatened species of deer found at high altitudes in the eastern Tibetan Plateau
- White lipped frog (Chalcorana labialis), a species of "true frog", family Ranidae
- White-lipped island pitviper (Trimeresurus albolabris insularis), a venomous snake subspecies found in Indonesia
- White-lipped keelback (Amphiesma leucomystax), a nonvenomous snake native to Vietnam
- White-lipped mud turtle (Kinosternon leucostomum), a species of mud turtle in the family Kinosternidae
- White-lipped peccary (Tayassu pecari), a peccary species found in Central and South America in rainforest, dry forest and chaco scrub
- White-lipped python, several species of snake
- White-lipped snail (Cepaea hortensis), a medium-sized species of air-breathing land snail, a terrestrial pulmonate gastropod mollusc
- White-lipped Snake (Drysdalia coronoides), a small species of elapid snake that is restricted to south-eastern mainland Australia and Tasmania
- White-lipped tamarin (Saguinus labiatus), the red-bellied tamarin, a tamarin which lives in the Amazon area of Brazil and Bolivia
- White-lipped tree frog (Litoria infrafrenata), the giant tree frog, the world's largest tree frog
- Haitan white-lipped anole (Anolis Coelestinus) a small lizard, one that usually is only found in Haiti
