= Forest frog (disambiguation) =

The forest frog (Platymantis) is a genus of frogs in the family Ceratobatrachidae found in the Philippines, Palau, Fiji, New Guinea, and in the Admiralty, Bismarck, and Solomon Islands.

Forest frog may also refer to:

- Assam forest frog (Hylarana leptoglossa), a frog in the family Ranidae native to Bangladesh, northeastern India, Myanmar, western Thailand, and Bhutan
- Bahia forest frog (Odontophrynus alipioi), a frog in the family Odontophrynidae endemic to Brazil
- Emerald forest frog (Hylorina sylvatica), a frog in the family Batrachylidae found in Argentina and Chile
- Forest night frog (Nyctibatrachus sylvaticus), a frog in the family Nyctibatrachidae endemic to India
- Forest rain frog (Breviceps sylvestris), a frog in the family Brevicipitidae endemic to Limpopo, South Africa
- Rattray's forest frog (Anhydrophryne rattrayi), a frog in the family Pyxicephalidae endemic to the Eastern Cape of South Africa
- Schmidt's forest frog (Hydrolaetare schmidti), a frog in the family Leptodactylidae found in Brazil, Colombia, French Guiana, and Peru

== See also ==
- Forest stream frog (disambiguation)
- Forest tree frog (disambiguation)
