= Green pit viper =

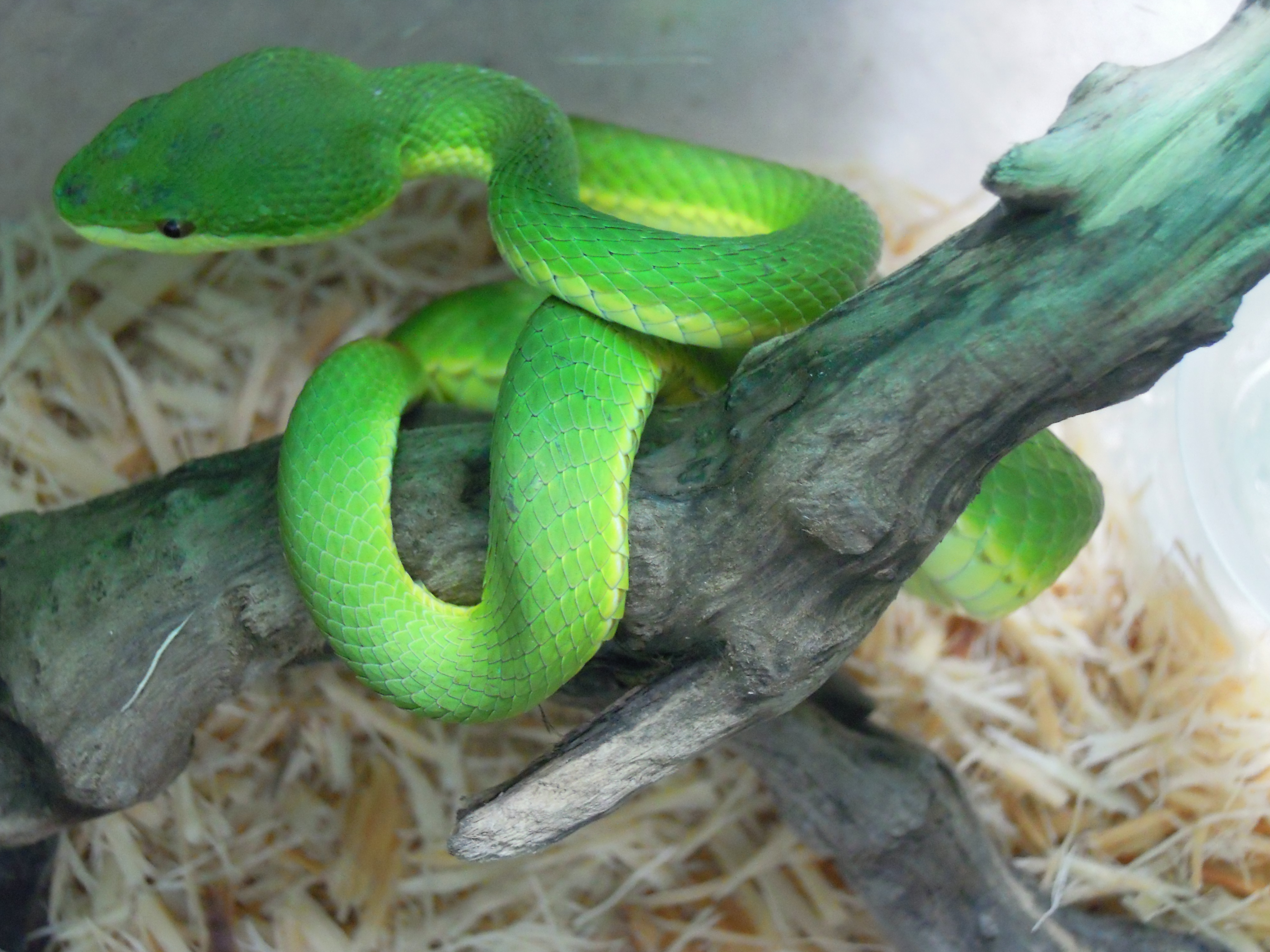
A green pit viper

Green pit viper is a common name for several venomous snakes and may refer to:

- Trimeresurus albolabris, native to southeastern Asia from India to China and Indonesia
- Trimeresurus macrops, native to Thailand, Cambodia and Vietnam
- Trimeresurus trigonocephalus, endemic to Sri Lanka
- Trimeresurus salazar, native to India and named after Salazar Slytherin of the Harry Potter fantasy literature series.
