= Schmidt's frog =

Schmidt's frog may refer to:

- Schmidt's forest frog, a frog found in Brazil, Colombia, French Guiana, and Peru
- Schmidt's mountain brook frog, a frog found in Guatemala and Mexico
- Schmidt's robber frog, a frog endemic to Hispaniola
- Schmidt's snouted frog, a toad endemic to the Democratic Republic of the Congo
- Schmidt's Uruguay tree frog, a frog found in Argentina, Brazil, and Uruguay
