= Cyrtodactylus vedda =

Scientific classification
- Kingdom: Animalia
- Phylum: Chordata
- Class: Reptilia
- Order: Squamata
- Suborder: Gekkota
- Family: Gekkonidae
- Genus: Cyrtodactylus
- Species: C. vedda

Binomial name
- Cyrtodactylus vedda Amarasinghe, Karunarathna, Campbell, Gayan, Ranasinghe, De Silva, & Mirza, 2022

Gecko endemic to Vietnam

Cyrtodactylus vedda is a species of gecko that is endemic to Sri Lanka.
