= Haploclastus psychedelicus =

Scientific classification
- Kingdom: Animalia
- Phylum: Arthropoda
- Subphylum: Chelicerata
- Class: Arachnida
- Order: Araneae
- Infraorder: Mygalomorphae
- Family: Theraphosidae
- Genus: Haploclastus
- Species: H. psychedelicus

Binomial name
- Haploclastus psychedelicus (Sanap & Mirza, 2014)

Species of spider

Haploclastus psychedelicus, synonym Thrigmopoeus psychedelicus, is a theraphosid spider. It is native to India.

== Etymology ==
The specific name psychedelicus refers to the word "psychedelia", referring to the adult's bright blue carapace and legs.

== Characteristics ==
H. psychedelicus has a blue metallic tinge to the cephalothorax and legs, and has scattered maxillary setae on the prolateral face of the maxillae. In other species it is C-shaped.
