= Cyrtodactylus arunachalensis =

Scientific classification
- Kingdom: Animalia
- Phylum: Chordata
- Class: Reptilia
- Order: Squamata
- Suborder: Gekkota
- Family: Gekkonidae
- Genus: Cyrtodactylus
- Species: C. arunachalensis

Binomial name
- Cyrtodactylus arunachalensis Mirza, Bhosale, Ansari, Phansalkar, Sawant, Gowande, & Patel, 2021

Species of lizard

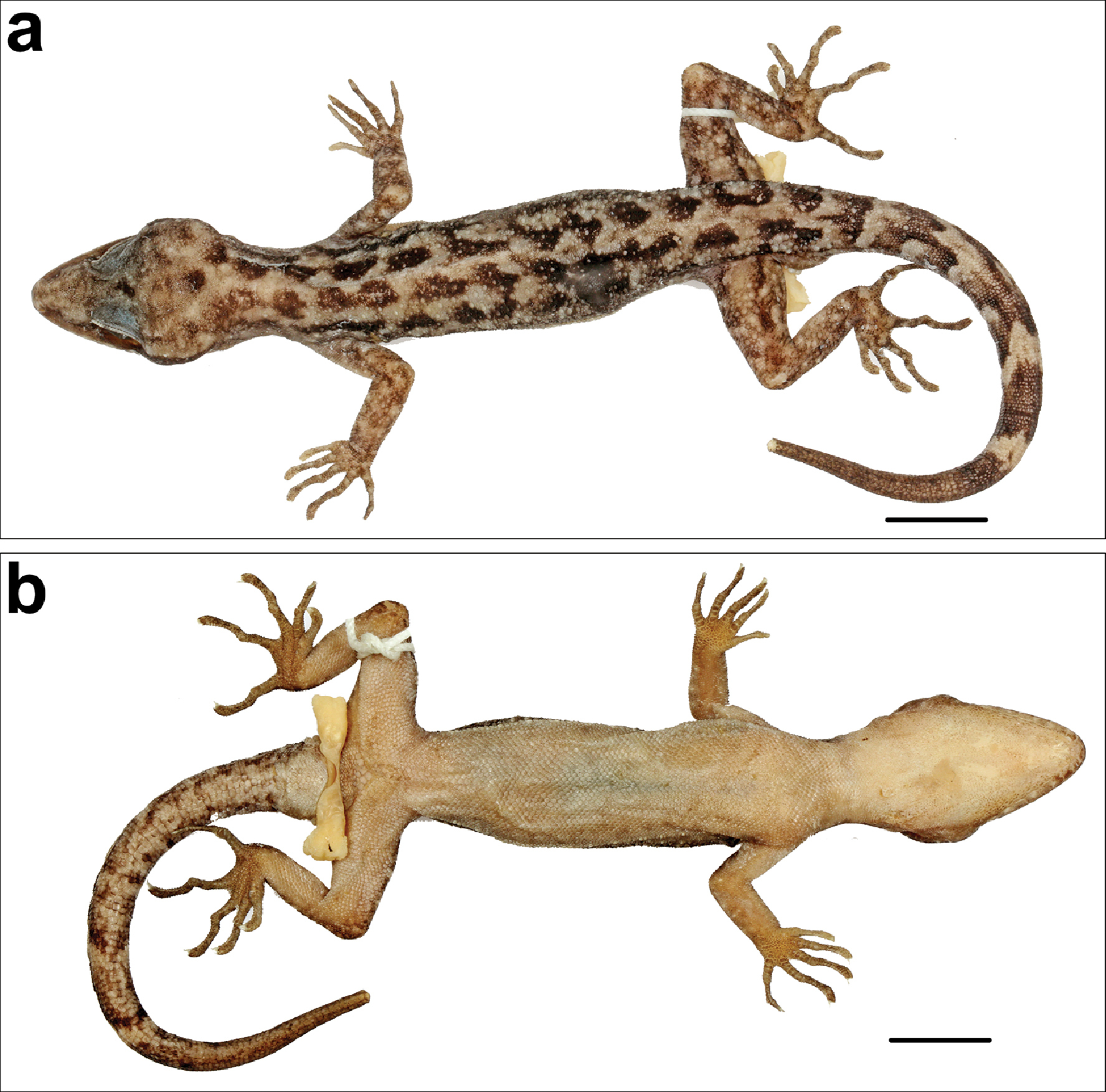
Cyrtodactylus arunachalensis

Cyrtodactylus arunachalensis is a species of gecko that is endemic to Arunachal Pradesh in India.
