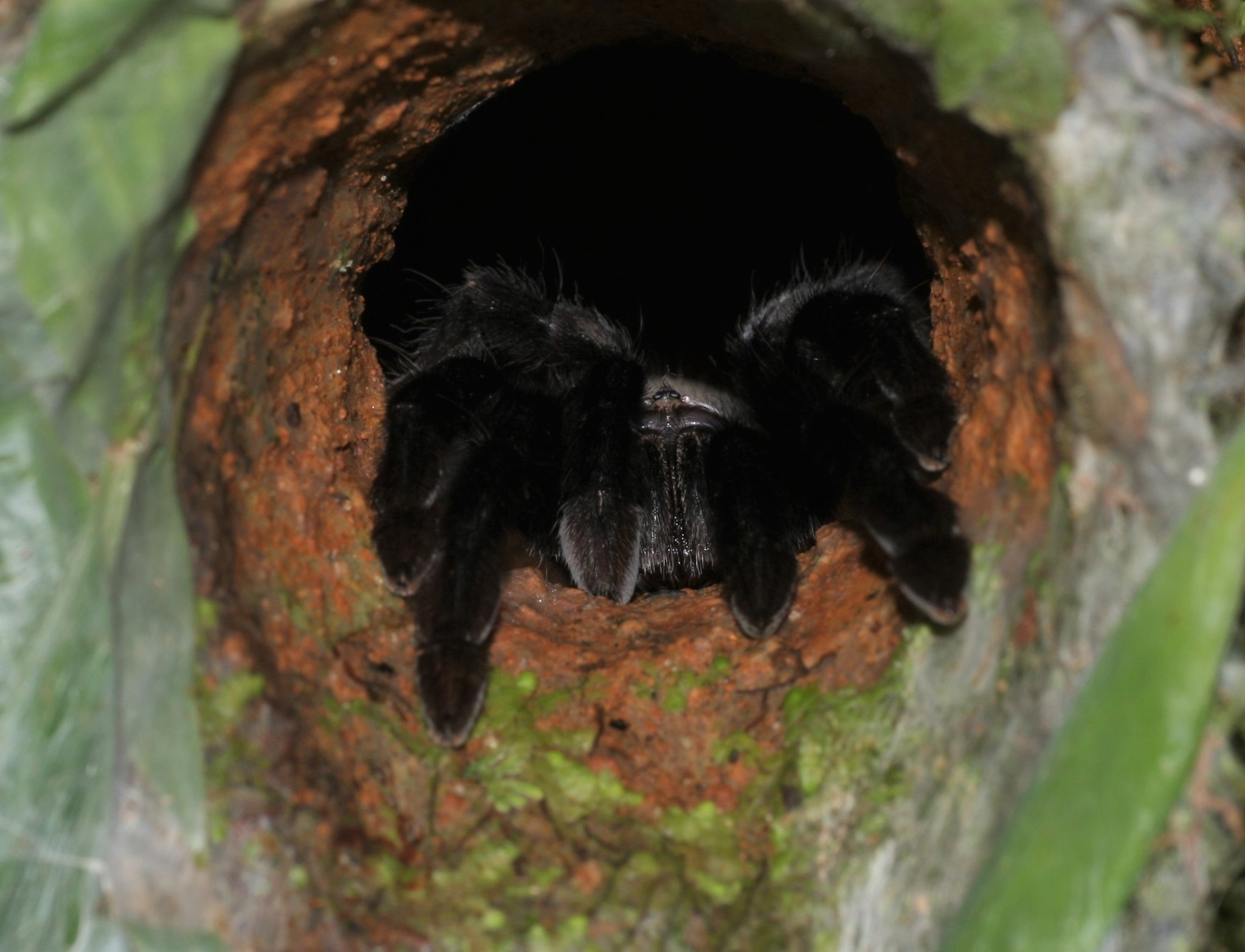
- *Cilantica kayi* from Tamil Nadu, India.

Scientific classification
- Kingdom: Animalia
- Phylum: Arthropoda
- Subphylum: Chelicerata
- Class: Arachnida
- Order: Araneae
- Infraorder: Mygalomorphae
- Family: Theraphosidae
- Genus: Cilantica; Mirza, 2024

Type species
- C. agasthyaensis Mirza, 2024

= Cilantica =

Genus of spiders

Cilantica is a genus of Indian tarantulas that was described by Mirza in 2024. Two members from Haploclastus were transferred into the genus along with one new species. They are only found in the Palakkad Gap.

== Etymology ==
The name is the Latinized form of the Tamil word for spider, silanthi (சிலந்த).

== Diagnosis ==
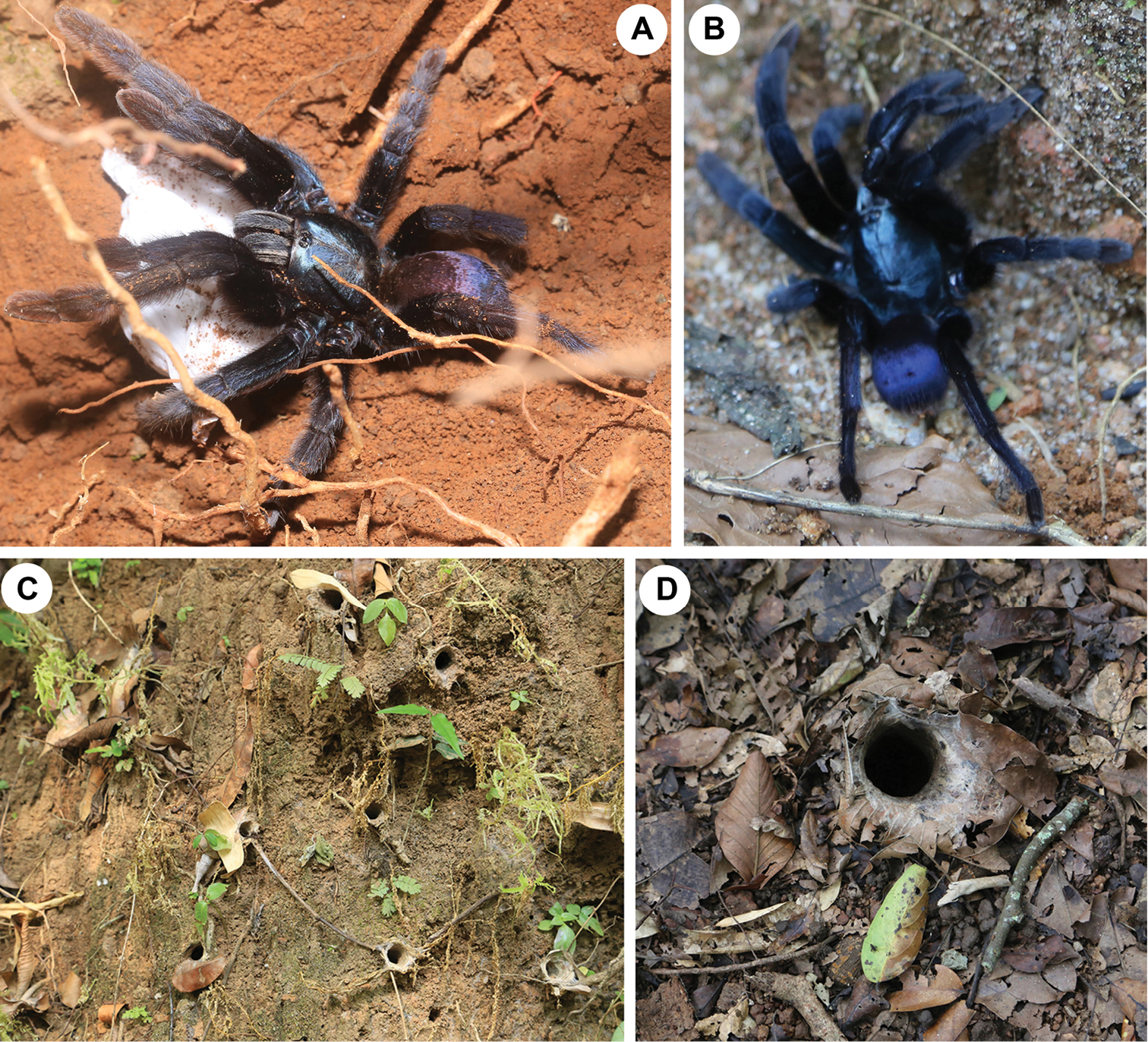
Cilantica devamatha

Large spiders, measuring 25–38 mm. The carapace is oval, hairy, with two distinct setae-free bands on each side of the caput. The fovea is shallow and curved. The posterior sternal sigilla are not very deep and are placed near the center. The retrolateral face of the chelicerae has parallel rows of thick, curved setae. The prolateral face of the maxilla features stout black bristles arranged along the suture line. Spines are present on legs II–IV. The spermathecae are mound-shaped. Females carry the egg sac under their chelicerae.

== Ecology ==
The burrow is typically found on mud walls and embankments along streams, with a tubular extension made of soil, leaves, or other nearby materials. Females of Cilantica agasthyaensis were observed at two locations holding their egg sacs under the chelicerae.

== Species ==
As of January 2025, it contains three species, all found in India:

- Cilantica agasthyaensis (Mirza, 2024) (type)
- Cilantica devamatha (Prasanth & Sunil Jose, 2014)
- Cilantica kayi (Gravely, 1915)
