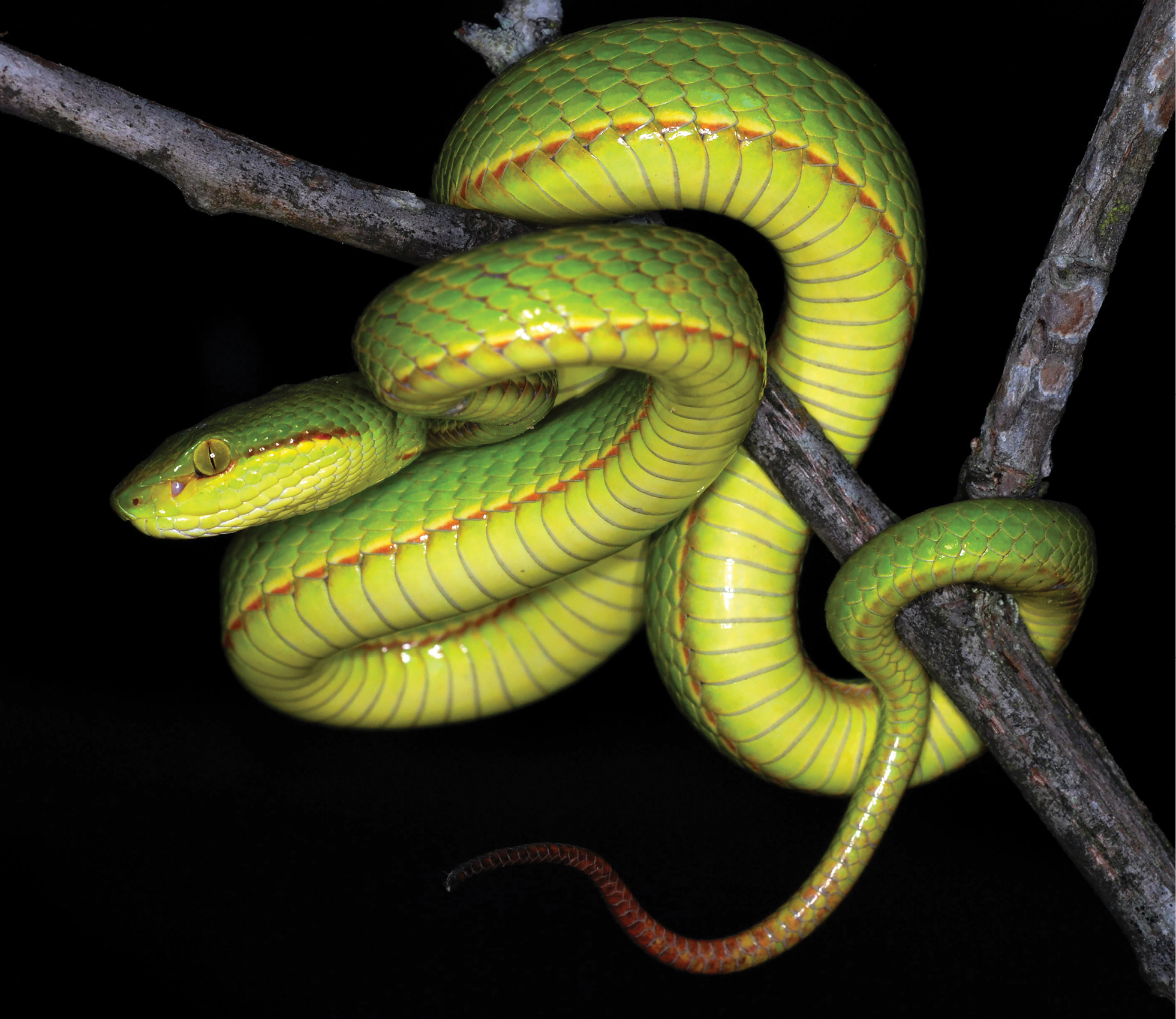

Scientific classification
- Kingdom: Animalia
- Phylum: Chordata
- Class: Reptilia
- Order: Squamata
- Suborder: Serpentes
- Family: Viperidae
- Subfamily: Crotalinae
- Genus: Trimeresurus
- Species: T. salazar

Binomial name
- Trimeresurus salazar Mirza et al., 2020

= Trimeresurus salazar =

Species of snake

Trimeresurus salazar, also known as Salazar's pit viper, is a species of venomous, green pit viper first discovered in 2019 in the lowlands of the western part of Arunachal Pradesh, India; the fifth new reptile species to be discovered in the region in 2019. It was named after Salazar Slytherin from the Harry Potter series. It has a dark green head and yellowish green dorsal scales on the rest of its body. The species is sexually dichromatic; the males have reddish-orange and yellow-orange stripes and a rusty red-orange tail that the females lack. Its habitat is under threat from human development activities.

== Taxonomy and etymology ==
This snake was first discovered during a herpetological expedition in the summer of 2019 to the Eastern Himalayas in Arunachal Pradesh, India, which is a biodiversity hotspot and has a high degree of landscape heterogeneity with elevation ranging from 100 to 7000 m and distinct climatic regimes. The expedition collected two specimens of a green pit viper of the genus Trimeresurus in the lowlands near Pakke Tiger Reserve, which were believed to be either Trimeresurus septentrionalis or Trimeresurus albolabris based upon their coloration and the number of dorsal scale rows. These specimens were later compared with eleven specimens of T. septentrionalis and T. albolabris from the collections of the Bombay Natural History Society, the Natural History Museum, London, National Museum of Natural History in Paris and the University of Copenhagen, and differences were found in the coloration of the lateral stripe on the head and the body in males. Molecular analysis of the genomic DNA confirmed that the specimens were a new species of green pit viper. It became the fifth new reptile species to be discovered in Arunachal Pradesh in 2019. The researchers also found two specimens of the new species in the Natural History Museum of Denmark which had been collected by a Danish naturalist, Bernt Wilhelm Westermann, between 1811 and 1816 but were wrongly labeled as white-lipped pit vipers.

This new species of green pit viper, Trimeresurus salazar, was named after Salazar Slytherin from the Harry Potter series, with a suggested common name of Salazar's pit viper. In the fictional book and movie series, Slytherin is famous for being a Parselmouth, a person who can communicate with snakes. As such, the house he founded in Hogwarts is represented by a snake, and is also associated with the color green.

== Description ==
Salazar's pit viper has a long and thin body with a length reaching 363 to 415 mm, and a triangular, elongated head which is clearly distinct from the neck. These vipers are green but also have yellow, orange, red, or gold markings. Males have a reddish orange stripe running from their preocular scales to the lateral side of the nape, a yellow-orange ventrolateral stripe and a short, bilobed hemipenis. The head is dark green in color which fades to a yellowish green color on its dorsal scales, except for the first dorsal scale row which is yellowish white with a faint orange patch. The tail has rusty red dorsal scales and orange ventral scales. Juveniles are brightly colored with the males having a much more prominent lateral stripe on the head. Females lack both reddish orange head stripe and the yellow-orange ventrolateral stripe. The appearance of T. salazar is different to the T. albolabris, T. septentrionalis, and the T. insularis because of the greater number of pterygoid and dentary teeth, the reddish-orange head stripe in the males and the smaller size of its hemipenis. It has 6 palatine, 15 pterygoid and 19 dentary teeth.

The species has 19 to 21 rows of moderately keeled dorsal scales at mid-body, 163 to 171 ventral scales, 59 to 74 subcaudal scales, 12 to 13 infralabial scales and 10 to 11 supralabial scales with the first supralabial scale being fused with the nasal scale.

== Distribution and habitat ==
Findings of T. salazar and T. cf. salazar as of 2022: Mirza et al. (light green), Rathee et al. (green), Koirala et al. (gray)

Salazar's pit vipers have been found at an elevation of 172 metres above sea level in the Eastern Himalayas, in the lowlands of Assam and Arunachal Pradesh in India. They are also confirmed to be present in Meghalaya, Mizoram, the slopes of Darjeeling in West Bengal, also has been recorded from Tripura Tripura and they are also likely to occur in Bangladesh. The species was later documented near Lumang in the Tashigang Territorial Forest Division in eastern Bhutan and in Jashpur district, Chhattisgarh. They are nocturnal snakes and have been observed coiled on shrubs at night.

Their diversity could be underestimated as the species belonging to the Trimeresurus genus are morphologically cryptic, which makes them difficult to identify in the field, requiring evidence based upon morphological, ecological and molecular data. Their habitat in Arunachal Pradesh is under threat from development activities such as road widening, agriculture and hydroelectric projects, especially the proposed 49 km long Seijosa-Bhalukpong road which cuts right through their habitat, and the proposed Dibang Dam.

== Diet ==
The diet of pit vipers in the genus Trimeresurus includes lizards, amphibians, birds, rodents, and other small mammals.
