= Hydrolaetare caparu =

Conservation status
- Least Concern (IUCN 3.1)

Scientific classification
- Kingdom: Animalia
- Phylum: Chordata
- Class: Amphibia
- Order: Anura
- Family: Leptodactylidae
- Genus: Hydrolaetare
- Species: H. caparu

Binomial name
- Hydrolaetare caparu Jansen, Gonzales-Álvarez, and Köhler, 2007

Species of frog

Hydrolaetare caparu, the Caparu forest frog, is a species of frog in the family Leptodactylidae. It is endemic to Brazil and Bolivia.

== Habitat ==
This frog lives in seasonally flooded forests. Scientists have observed the frog between 68 and 185 meters above sea level. Scientists believe the frog digs a burrow for the dry season.

Scientists have reported these frogs inside Parque Estadual de Corumbiaria and suspect it in another protected area, Parque Nacional Noel Kempff Mercado.

== Reproduction ==
The free-swimming tadpoles develop in streams.

== Threats ==
The IUCN classifies this frog as least concern of extinction. Principal threats include fires and habitat loss associated with land conversion to agriculture and cattle grazing.

== Original description ==
- Jansen M; Alvarez LG; Kohler G (2007). "New species of Hydrolaetare (Anura, Leptodactylidae) from Bolivia with some notes on its natural history". Journal of Herpetology. 41 (4): 724–732. doi:10.1670/06-289.1.
