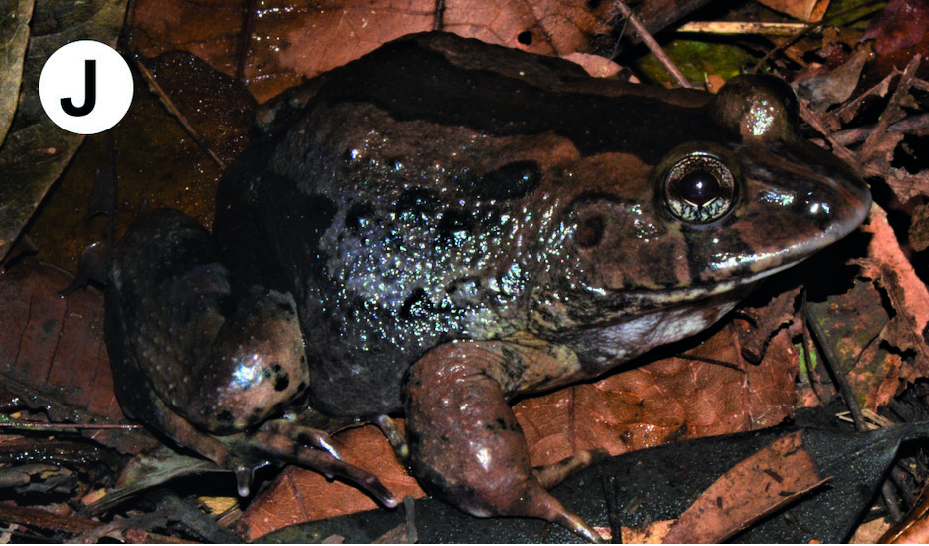
- Hydrolaetare schmidti

Scientific classification
- Kingdom: Animalia
- Phylum: Chordata
- Class: Amphibia
- Order: Anura
- Family: Leptodactylidae
- Subfamily: Leptodactylinae
- Genus: Hydrolaetare; Gallardo, 1963

Type species
- Limnomedusa schmidti Cochran and Goin, 1959

Species
- See text.

= Hydrolaetare =

Genus of amphibians

Hydrolaetare is a genus of leptodactylid frogs. These frogs are found in Colombia, French Guiana, Peru, Bolivia, and Brazil.

== Species ==
There are three species in this genus.

Binomial Name and Author	Common Name
Hydrolaetare caparu Jansen, Álvarez & Köhler, 2007	Caparu forest frog
Hydrolaetare dantasi (Bokermann, 1959)	Feijo white-lipped frog
Hydrolaetare schmidti (Cochran & Goin, 1959)	Schmidt's forest frog
