= Phlogiodes =

Scientific classification
- Kingdom: Animalia
- Phylum: Arthropoda
- Subphylum: Chelicerata
- Class: Arachnida
- Order: Araneae
- Infraorder: Mygalomorphae
- Family: Theraphosidae
- Genus: Phlogiodes; Pocock, 1899
- Species: P. validus

Binomial name
- Phlogiodes validus Pocock, 1899

Synonyms
- Haploclastus validus (Pocock, 1899); Phlogiodes robustus Pocock, 1899

Genus of spiders

Phlogiodes is a genus of spiders in the tarantula family Theraphosidae, found in India. As of January 2025, a single species is accepted, Phlogiodes validus. The species has been transferred back and forth between Phlogiodes and Haploclastus.

== Taxonomy ==
The genus Phlogiodes was erected by Reginald Pocock in 1899. He described two species, Phlogiodes validus from a male specimen and Phlogiodes robustus from a female specimen. He considered the male and female to be too different to be the same species. In 1985, Robert Raven sank Phlogiodes into Haploclastus. In 2010, Pocock's two Phlogiodes species were synonymized and transferred to Haploclastus as Haploclastus validus. In 2013, H. validus was restored to Phlogiodes, the placement accepted by the World Spider Catalog as of January 2025. In 2024, the species was again placed in Haploclastus.
