= Zeeshan Mirza =

Indian herpetologist and arachnologist

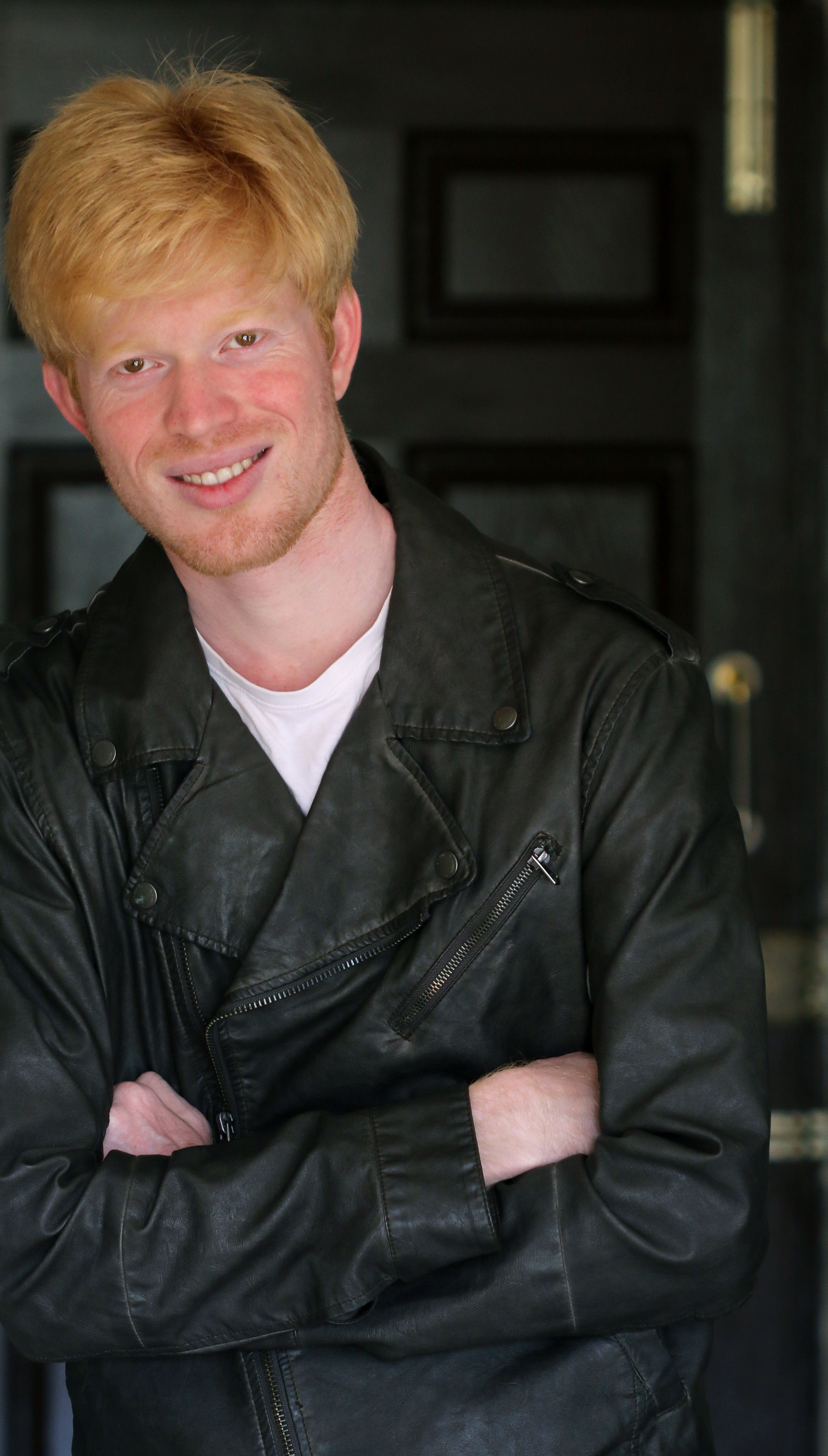
- Zeeshan Mirza
- Born: Zeeshan Ayaz Mirza; March 1988 (age 38); Mumbai, Maharashtra, India
- Education: Bhavan's College; University of Mumbai
- Known for: Description of 60+ new species Genus Cilantica; Trimeresurus salazar Anguiculus dicaprioi
- Awards: Vincent Roth Award (2009); Sanctuary Asia Young Naturalist Award (2010)
- Scientific career
- Fields: Herpetology, Arachnology, Systematics, Molecular phylogenetics, Developmental biology
- Workplaces: Max Planck Institute for Biology; National Centre for Biological Sciences
- Website: zeeshanamirza.com

Zeeshan Ayaz Mirza (born March 1988) is an Indian herpetologist and arachnologist, who is a doctoral candidate at the Max Planck Institute for Biology in Tübingen, Germany. Specializing in systematics, molecular phylogenetics, and taxonomy, Mirza is recognized for having described more than 60 new species of reptiles and arachnids, including snakes, tarantulas, geckos, and scorpions.

His discoveries include species of significant media interest, such as the snake Trimeresurus salazar, named after the Harry Potter character Salazar Slytherin, and Anguiculus dicaprioi, named in reference to actor Leonardo DiCaprio. Mirza also described the tarantula genus Cilantica in 2024, endemic to the Western Ghats of India. His research focuses primarily on the biodiversity of the Western Ghats and the Himalayas, two of India's most important biogeographic regions.

== Early life and education ==
Zeeshan Ayaz Mirza was born in Mumbai in March 1988 and grew up near Aarey Milk Colony, an urban green area located in the city's suburbs. His interest in nature developed from childhood, when he explored local biodiversity and conducted snake rescues in the Mumbai metropolitan area. By age 22, Mirza had accumulated field experience equivalent to that of researchers twice his age and had published more than 20 scientific papers.

Mirza graduated with a Bachelor of Science in zoology from Bhavan's College, affiliated with the University of Mumbai, and subsequently completed a master's degree in life sciences. His academic journey was marked by an unconventional path, with strong emphasis on field work and independent research from his undergraduate years. During this period, he initiated collaborations with Indian and international research institutions, establishing the foundations for his prolific scientific career.

Currently, Mirza is a doctoral candidate at the Max Planck Institute for Biology in Tübingen, Germany, where his research has shifted focus to developmental biology, studying developmental plasticity in nematodes of the genus Pristionchus. Despite this shift in research area, he maintains active collaborations in herpetology and arachnology, continuing to describe new species and revise complex taxonomic groups.

== Career and research ==
Mirza's scientific career began in earnest during his undergraduate studies, when he started documenting the reptile and arachnid fauna near Mumbai. His first taxonomic paper on snakes not only described a new species but also established a new genus, marking the beginning of a series of significant contributions to Asian vertebrate and invertebrate systematics.

Before joining the Max Planck Institute, Mirza was a research associate at the National Centre for Biological Sciences (NCBS), affiliated with the Tata Institute of Fundamental Research in Bangalore. At this institution, he developed much of his research in reptile and arachnid systematics, with emphasis on integrative approaches combining morphology, molecular phylogenetics, and biogeographic analysis.

His field research spans various regions of India, with special focus on the Western Ghats and the Himalayas. Between 2014 and 2024, Mirza conducted extensive expeditions through states including Arunachal Pradesh, Mizoram, Himachal Pradesh, Kerala, Tamil Nadu, and Karnataka. A single month-and-a-half expedition to Arunachal Pradesh in 2019, for example, resulted in the discovery of three new snake species, two new bent-toed gecko species, and an entirely new genus of lizards.

Mirza works regularly in collaboration with other researchers, with Rajesh Sanap being one of his main collaborators in arachnid studies. His methodologies include detailed morphological analyses, DNA sequencing, phylogenetic studies, and comprehensive taxonomic revisions. Notably, Mirza has also incorporated unconventional tools into his research, such as using social media for species identification. In 2020, during the COVID-19 pandemic, a photograph of a snake posted on Instagram by Virender Bhardwaj led Mirza to identify a new species, Oligodon churahensis, from Churah Valley in Himachal Pradesh.

His areas of expertise include the snake genera Trimeresurus, Oligodon, Liopeltis, and Gongylosoma, as well as various groups of arachnids, including tarantulas from the subfamilies Thrigmopoeinae and Eumenophorinae, and geckos from the genera Cnemaspis, Gekko, and Hemidactylus. With over 70 published scientific papers and 857 citations on Google Scholar, Mirza has established himself as one of the leading authorities on Indian subcontinent biodiversity.

== Notable discoveries ==
=== Snakes ===
One of Mirza's most widely publicized discoveries was Trimeresurus salazar, a green pit viper found in Arunachal Pradesh in 2020 and named after Salazar Slytherin, a character from J.K. Rowling's Harry Potter series. The species was discovered near Pakke Tiger Reserve and is characterized by a unique orange-red stripe along the head and body of males. The name choice was motivated by Slytherin being a wizard capable of speaking to snakes (Parselmouth) and founder of Slytherin House, whose symbol is a serpent.

In 2024, Mirza described Anguiculus dicaprioi, a Himalayan snake named in honor of actor Leonardo DiCaprio for his environmental activism. The discovery was initiated when a photograph of the snake was posted on Instagram by Virender Bhardwaj in June 2020, during the COVID-19 pandemic. Mirza, upon viewing the image in his timeline, recognized it as a potentially new species, leading to three years of detailed investigations that confirmed not only a new species but an entirely new genus, Anguiculus.

Another notable case involving social media was the discovery of Oligodon churahensis, from Churah Valley in Himachal Pradesh, also resulting from a photograph shared on Instagram. In 2016, Mirza described the genus Wallaceophis, named in honor of Alfred Russel Wallace, the British naturalist who formulated the theory of natural selection independently of Charles Darwin. The species Wallaceophis gujaratensis was discovered in Gujarat, a region considered less biodiverse in India, highlighting the need for scientific exploration in neglected areas. Mirza is a great admirer of Wallace, stating that "everybody knows Darwin, but nobody knows his contemporary genius, Wallace".

=== Tarantulas ===
In 2024, Mirza published a comprehensive systematic revision of the subfamily Thrigmopoeinae, endemic to the Western Ghats, describing the genus Cilantica and four new tarantula species. The work involved detailed morphological and phylogenetic analyses, transferring species previously classified in other genera and establishing new taxonomic relationships within the group. The discovery highlighted the rich diversity of arachnids in the Palakkad Gap region, an important biogeographic discontinuity in the Western Ghats.

Mirza has also worked extensively with other arachnid groups, including spiders of the family Dipluridae and various scorpion genera. His arachnology research is frequently developed in collaboration with Rajesh Sanap, with whom he has published numerous papers on Indian spider taxonomy and systematics.

=== Geckos and other reptiles ===
During a single month-and-a-half expedition to Arunachal Pradesh in 2019, Mirza discovered 12 new species of geckos in the genus Cnemaspis, demonstrating the extraordinary undocumented diversity of the region. In 2023, he described Gekko mizoramensis, a parachute gecko from Mizoram, characterized by extensive interdigital membranes that allow it to glide between trees. Mirza also named the gecko Hemidactylus vijayraghavani in honor of K. VijayRaghavan, then Principal Scientific Advisor to the Indian government and a professor who granted him laboratory space at NCBS.

== Awards and recognition ==
At age 22, Mirza was awarded the Vincent Roth Award by the American Arachnological Society in 2009, recognizing his exceptional contributions to arachnology at a young age. The following year, he received the Sanctuary Asia - RBS Young Naturalist Award in 2010, a prize granted by the Sanctuary Nature Foundation to young Indian conservationists with significant contributions to the country's biodiversity knowledge. At the time of the award, Mirza had already published more than 20 scientific papers and accumulated field experience equivalent to that of researchers twice his age.

Mirza is a member of several IUCN Species Survival Commission specialist groups, including the Spider and Scorpion Specialist Group, the Skink Specialist Group, and the Snake Specialist Group, participating in conservation status assessments of threatened species. He also serves as associate editor of the scientific journal Herpetology Notes, contributing to peer review of manuscripts on reptile and amphibian systematics and ecology.

His scientific output includes over 70 papers published in high-impact journals such as PLOS ONE, Zoosystematics and Evolution, Scientific Reports, and PeerJ, with 857 citations recorded on Google Scholar. Mirza is internationally recognized as one of the leading authorities on reptile and arachnid biodiversity of the Indian subcontinent.

== Conservation and activism ==
Mirza is a vocal advocate for Indian biodiversity conservation and a critic of illegal wildlife trade. An emblematic example he cites is that of Haploclastus devamatha (currently Cilantica devamatha), a tarantula scientifically described in 2014 that appeared for sale in international pet markets only eight months after its original description. This pattern repeats with other rare species, which quickly become targets of illegal collectors once their locations are published in scientific papers.

To mitigate this problem, Mirza adopts the practice of omitting precise geographic coordinates in his publications, providing only general locality information. He also advocates for requiring valid collection permits as a prerequisite for manuscript submission to scientific journals, and for encouraging consumption of certified captive-bred specimens rather than potentially smuggled animals from developing countries.

In an interview with Mongabay in 2025, Mirza expressed concern about human population growth as the main threat to biodiversity. When asked about the biggest challenge for conservation in India, he stated: "The increasing number of humans. Nature cannot coexist with humanity, especially in the way we humans currently are. Without effective population policies in the country, species will continue to decline". Despite this somber view, Mirza remains optimistic about discovering new species, noting that dedicated expeditions continue to reveal previously unknown biodiversity even in seemingly well-studied regions.

During his studies in Mumbai, Mirza conducted educational tours at Sanjay Gandhi National Park and Aarey Milk Colony, introducing people to local biodiversity and promoting conservation awareness. He remains active on social media, sharing scientific discoveries and educating the public about the importance of preserving Indian fauna and flora.

== Selected publications ==
- Mirza, Zeeshan A.; Bhardwaj, Virender K.; Pal, Saunak; Lalremsanga, H. T.; Vogel, Gernot; Campbell, Patrick D.; Patel, Harshil (2024). "Phylogeny and systematics of the colubrid snake genera Liopeltis and Gongylosoma (Squamata: Colubridae) and description of a new Himalayan endemic genus and species". Scientific Reports. 14 (1) 24743. Bibcode:2024NatSR..1424743M. doi:10.1038/s41598-024-74271-1. PMID 39433812.
- Mirza, Zeeshan A. (2024). "Systematics of the Western Ghats endemic tarantula subfamily Thrigmopoeinae with the description of a new genus and four new species". Travaux du Muséum National d'Histoire Naturelle "Grigore Antipa". 67 (2): 183–234. doi:10.3897/travaux.67.e112517.
- Mirza, Zeeshan A.; Bhosale, Harshal S.; Phansalkar, Pushkar U.; Sawant, Mandar; Gowande, Gaurang G.; Patel, Harshil (2020). "A new species of green pit vipers of the genus Trimeresurus Lacépède, 1804 (Reptilia, Serpentes, Viperidae) from western Arunachal Pradesh, India". Zoosystematics and Evolution. 96: 123–138. doi:10.3897/zse.96.48431.
- Mirza, Zeeshan A.; Sanap, Rajesh V.; Kunte, Krushnamegh (2017). "A new genus and new species of diplurid spider (Araneae: Mygalomorphae: Dipluridae) from northeast India". Journal of Asia-Pacific Biodiversity. 10: 32–38. doi:10.1016/j.japb.2016.03.013.
- Mirza, Zeeshan A.; Vyas, Raju; Patel, Harshil; Maheta, Jaydeep; Sanap, Rajesh V. (2016). "A New Miocene-Divergent Lineage of Old World Racer Snake from India". PLOS ONE. 11 (3) e0148380. Bibcode:2016PLoSO..1148380M. doi:10.1371/journal.pone.0148380. PMC 4774991. PMID 26934509.
