= White-lipped python =

White-lipped python may refer to:

- Leiopython albertisii, a.k.a. D'Albert's water python, a non-venomous species found in New Guinea
- Liasis mackloti, a.k.a. Macklot's python, a non-venomous species found in Indonesia
