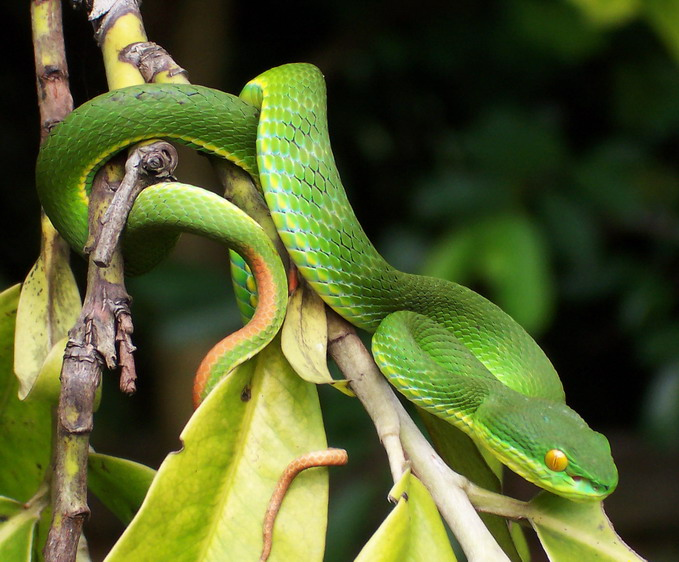

Conservation status
- Least Concern (IUCN 3.1)

Scientific classification
- Kingdom: Animalia
- Phylum: Chordata
- Class: Reptilia
- Order: Squamata
- Suborder: Serpentes
- Family: Viperidae
- Genus: Trimeresurus
- Species: T. albolabris

Binomial name
- Trimeresurus albolabris Gray, 1842
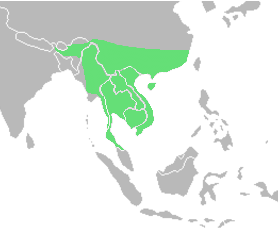

Synonyms
- Trimesurus albolabris Gray, 1842; T[rimeresurus]. albolabris – Theobald, 1879; Trimeresurus gramineus albolabris – Mell, 1922; Trimeresurus albolabris – Pope & Pope, 1933; Trimeresurus albolabris albolabris – Regenass & Kramer, 1981; Cryptelytrops albolabris – Malhotra & Thorpe, 2004; Trimeresurus (Trimeresurus) albolabris – David et al., 2011

= Trimeresurus albolabris =

Species of snake

Trimeresurus albolabris, the white-lipped pit viper or white-lipped tree viper, is a venomous pit viper species endemic to Southeast Asia.

== Taxonomy ==
Giannasi et al. (2001) raised insularis and septentrionalis to species level. Malhotra & Thorpe (2004) transferred this species (and a number of others) to the genus Cryptelytrops. David et al. (2011) returned it to the genus Trimeresurus and assigned it the subgenus Trimeresurus, creating the new combination Trimeresurus (Trimeresurus) albolabris.

Common names include green tree pit viper, white-lipped pit viper, white-lipped tree viper, white-lipped green pit viper and white-lipped bamboo pit viper.

== Description ==
Maximum total length males 600 mm (24 in), females 810 mm (32 in); maximum tail length males 120 mm (4.7 in), females 130 mm (5.1 in).

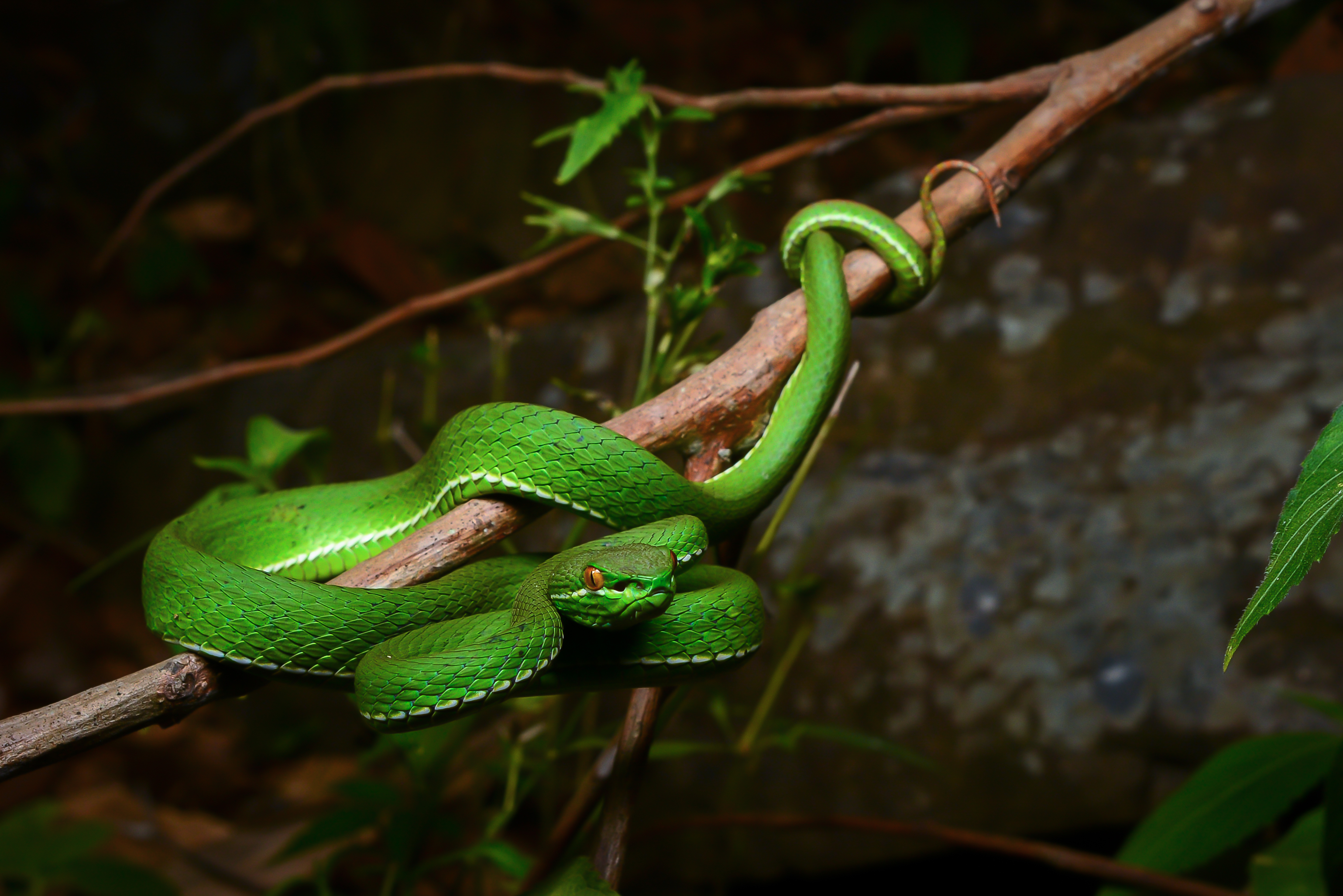
T. albolabris, White-lipped pit viper (adult, male) – Kaeng Krachan National Park

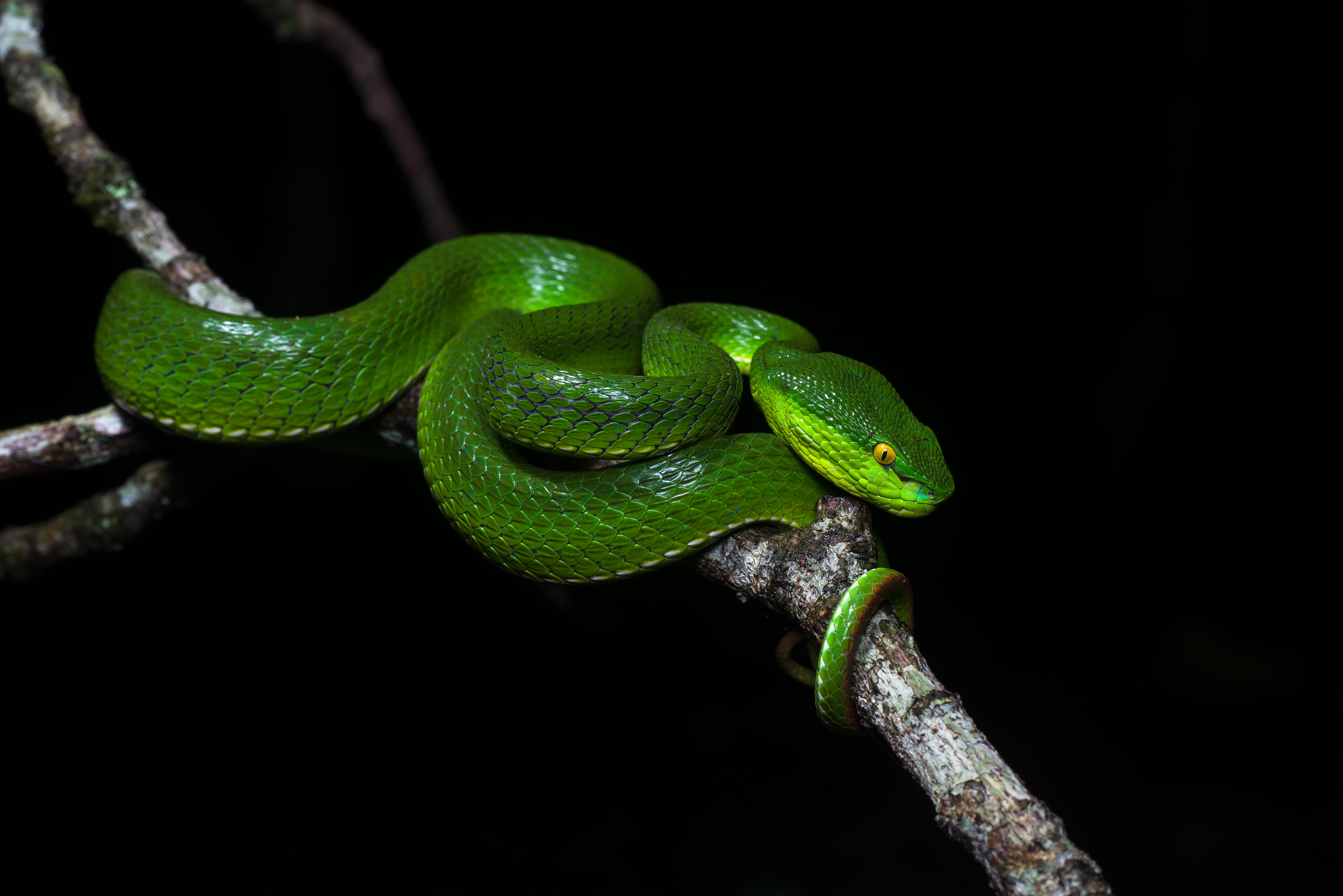
T. albolabris, White-lipped pit viper (adult, female) – Kaeng Krachan National Park

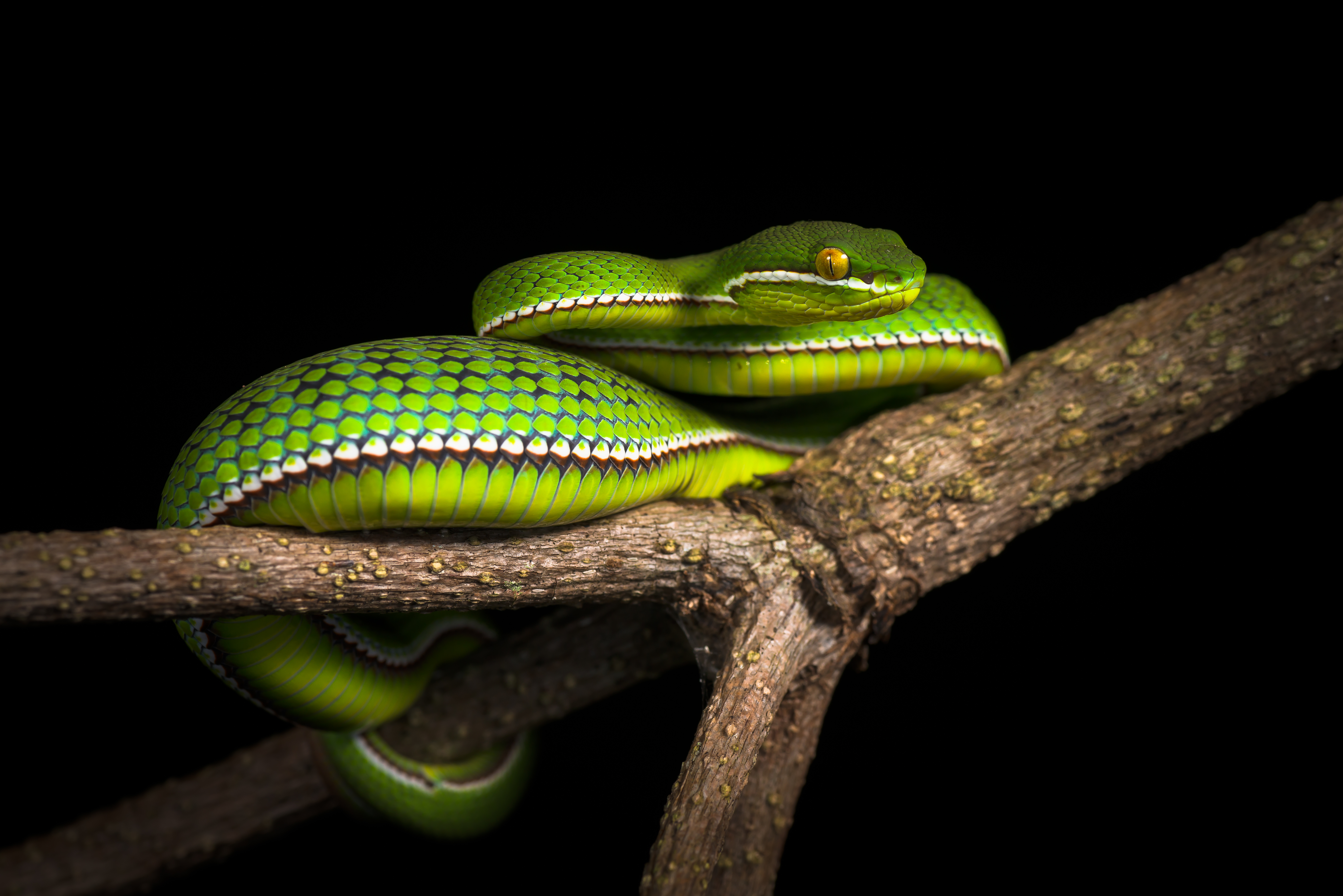
T. albolabris (juvenile/male) – Kaeng Krachan National Park

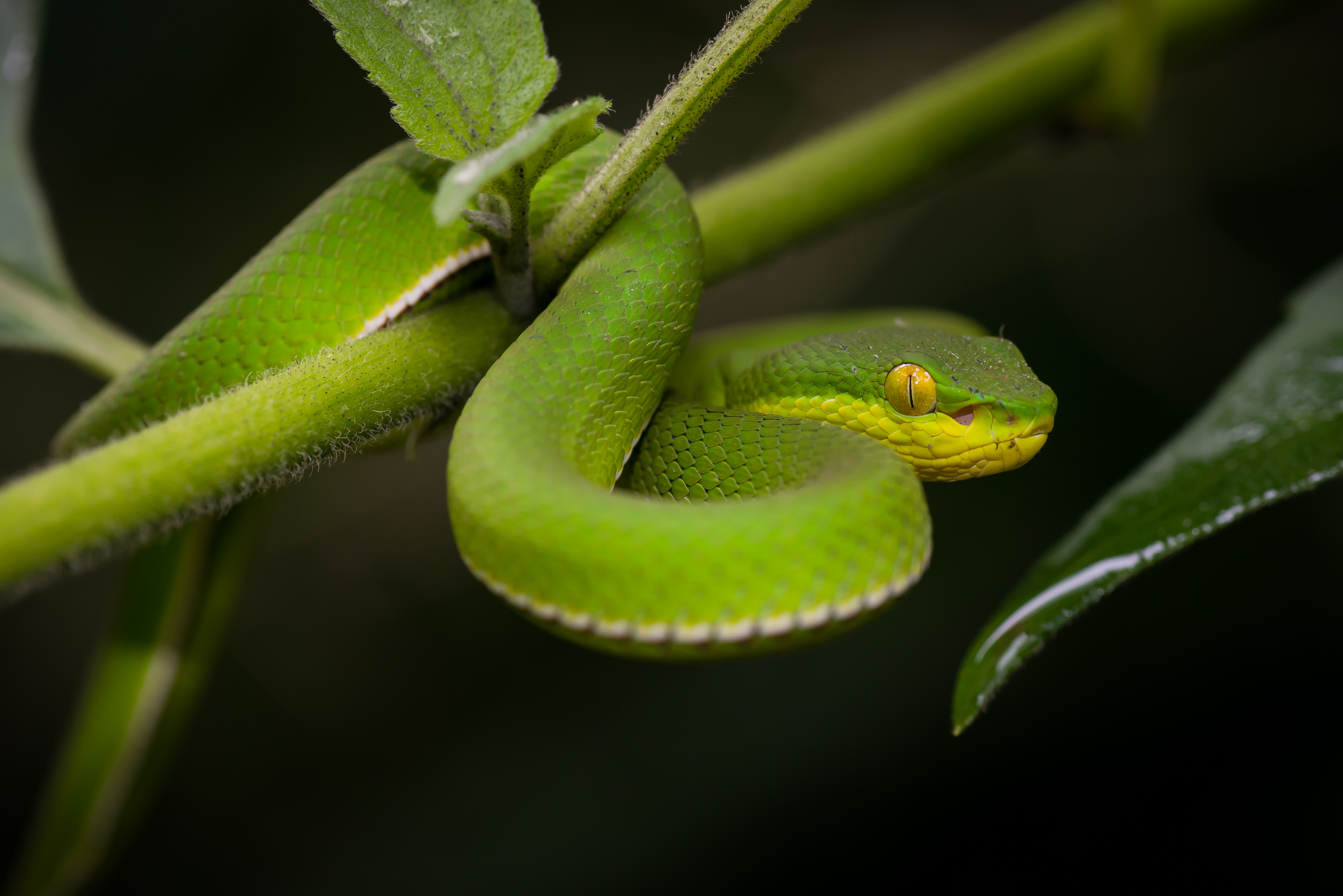
T. albolabris (juvenile/female) – Kaeng Krachan National Park

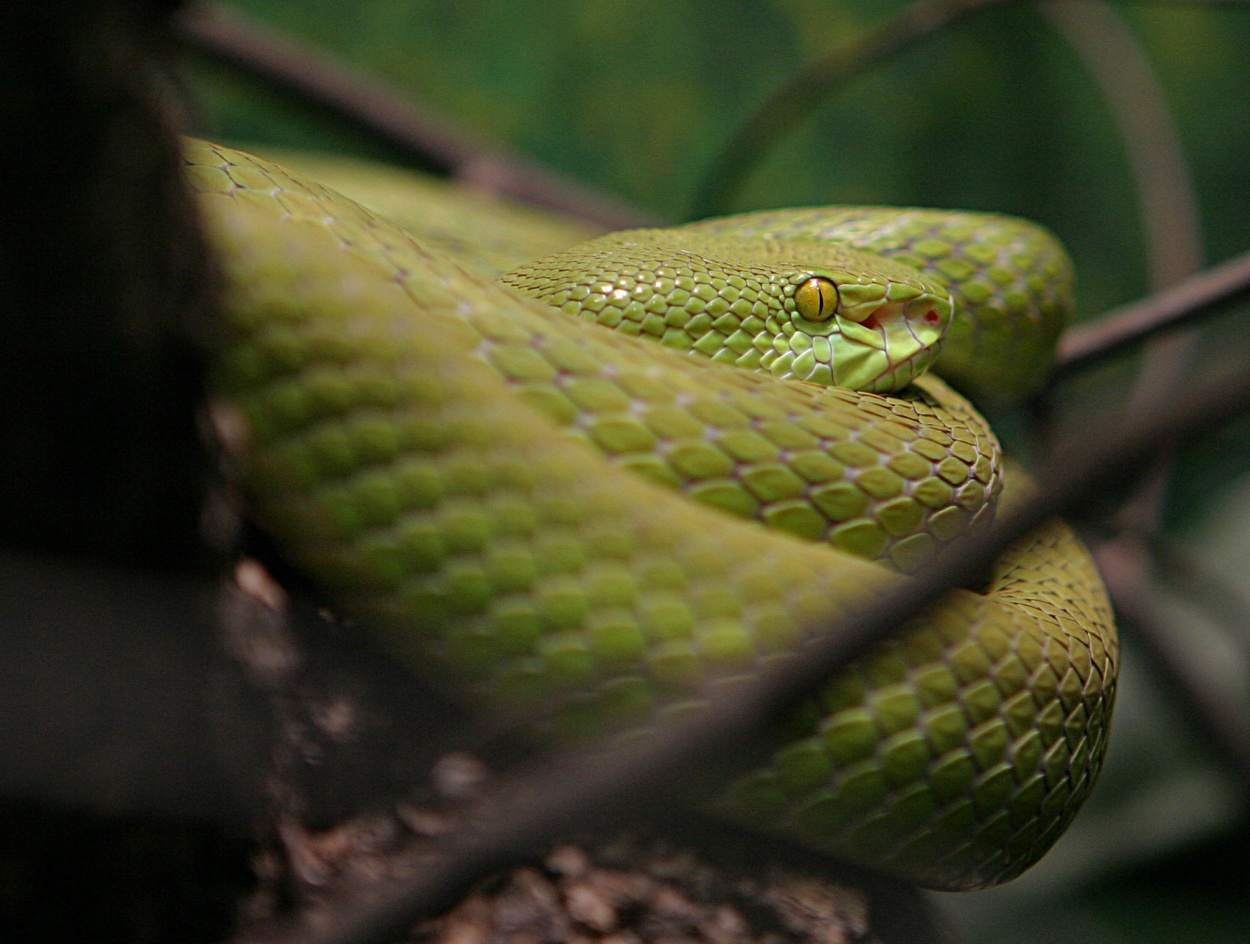
T. albolabris at the Houston Zoo

Head scalation consists of 10–11(12) upper labials, the first partially or completely fused to the nasal. Head scales small, subequal, feebly imbricate, smooth or weakly keeled. The supraoculars are narrow (occasionally enlarged and undivided) with 8–12 interocular scales between them. Temporal scales smooth.

Midbody has 29 (rarely 19) longitudinal dorsal scale rows. The ventral scales are 155–166 in males, 152–176 in females. The subcaudals are paired, 60–72 in males, 49–66 in females. The hemipenes are without spines.

Color pattern: green above, the side of the head below the eyes is yellow, white or pale green, much lighter than rest of head. The belly is green, yellowish or white below. A light ventrolateral stripe is present in all males, but absent in females. The end of tail is not mottled brown.

== Distribution and habitat ==
Found in Nepal, Bhutan, Myanmar, Thailand, Cambodia, Laos, Vietnam, southern China (Fujian, Hainan, Guangxi, Guangdong), Hong Kong, Macau, Indonesia (Sumatra, Java, Lombok, Sumbawa, Komodo, Flores, Sumba, Roti, Kisar, Wetar). The type locality given is "China".

The species is not found in India. Specimens from India have been recently re-identified as Trimeresurus salazar (Vogel et al. 2022). Specimens from the Nicobar islands have been described as Trimeresurus davidi, a new species.

== Diet ==
Its meals consist of birds, small frogs, and small mammals. This snake doesn't strike and release its prey; like many arboreal snakes, rather holds on to the prey item until it dies.

== Venom ==
The venom is primarily hemotoxic. Results of bites from this species range from mild envenoming to death. The venom of white-lipped pitviper contains procoagulant properties. There have been numerous reported bites with few fatalities.
