= Forest tree frog (disambiguation) =

Forest tree frog is a common name for Leptopelis, a genus of frogs found throughout Africa.

Forest tree frog may also refer to:

- Cloud forest tree frog (Megastomatohyla nubicola), a frog in the family Hylidae endemic to Mexico
- Forest green tree frog (Rhacophorus arboreus), a frog in the family Rhacophoridae endemic to Japan
