= Hydrolaetare dantasi =

Conservation status
- Least Concern (IUCN 3.1)

Scientific classification
- Kingdom: Animalia
- Phylum: Chordata
- Class: Amphibia
- Order: Anura
- Family: Leptodactylidae
- Genus: Hydrolaetare
- Species: H. dantasi

Binomial name
- Hydrolaetare dantasi (Bokermann, 1959)

Species of amphibian

Hydrolaetare dantasi (Feijo white-lipped frog) is a species of frog in the family Leptodactylidae. It is only known from the Amazon rainforest of Acre state in western Brazil, although it is likely that it has a wider distribution reaching Bolivia and Peru. It inhabits the forest floor in rainforests. What threat it faces comes from habitat loss associated with logging and cattle grazing.
