= Forest stream frog =

Forest stream frog may refer to:

- Cloud forest stream frog (Ptychohyla euthysanota), a frog in the family Hylidae found in El Salvador, Guatemala, Mexico, and possibly Honduras
- Pine forest stream frog (Ptychohyla macrotympanum), a frog in the family Hylidae found in Guatemala and possibly Mexico
