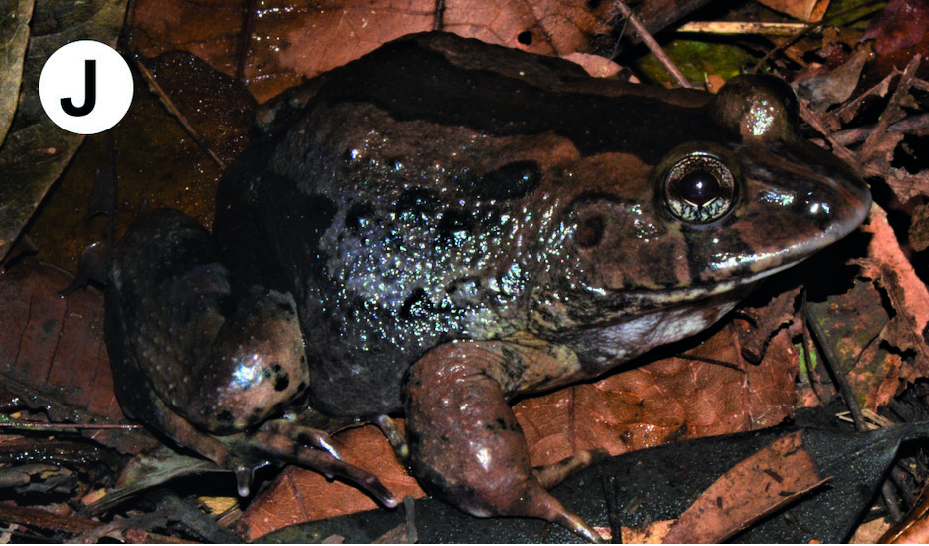
- Amapá, Brazil

Conservation status
- Least Concern (IUCN 3.1)

Scientific classification
- Kingdom: Animalia
- Phylum: Chordata
- Class: Amphibia
- Order: Anura
- Family: Leptodactylidae
- Genus: Hydrolaetare
- Species: H. schmidti

Binomial name
- Hydrolaetare schmidti (Cochran & Goin, 1959)

= Hydrolaetare schmidti =

Species of amphibian

Hydrolaetare schmidti (Schmidt's forest frog) is a species of frog in the family Leptodactylidae. It has a scattered distribution in the Amazon Basin in Brazil, Colombia, French Guiana, and Peru. Its natural habitats are marshes, swamps, and flooded forests. Scientists have seen it as high as 600 meters above sea level, including in protected areas. It is named after Karl Patterson Schmidt, American herpetologist.
