= Haploclastus =

Scientific classification
- Kingdom: Animalia
- Phylum: Arthropoda
- Subphylum: Chelicerata
- Class: Arachnida
- Order: Araneae
- Infraorder: Mygalomorphae
- Family: Theraphosidae
- Genus: Haploclastus; Simon, 1892

Type species
- H. cervinus Simon, 1892

Species
- 7, see text

Genus of spiders

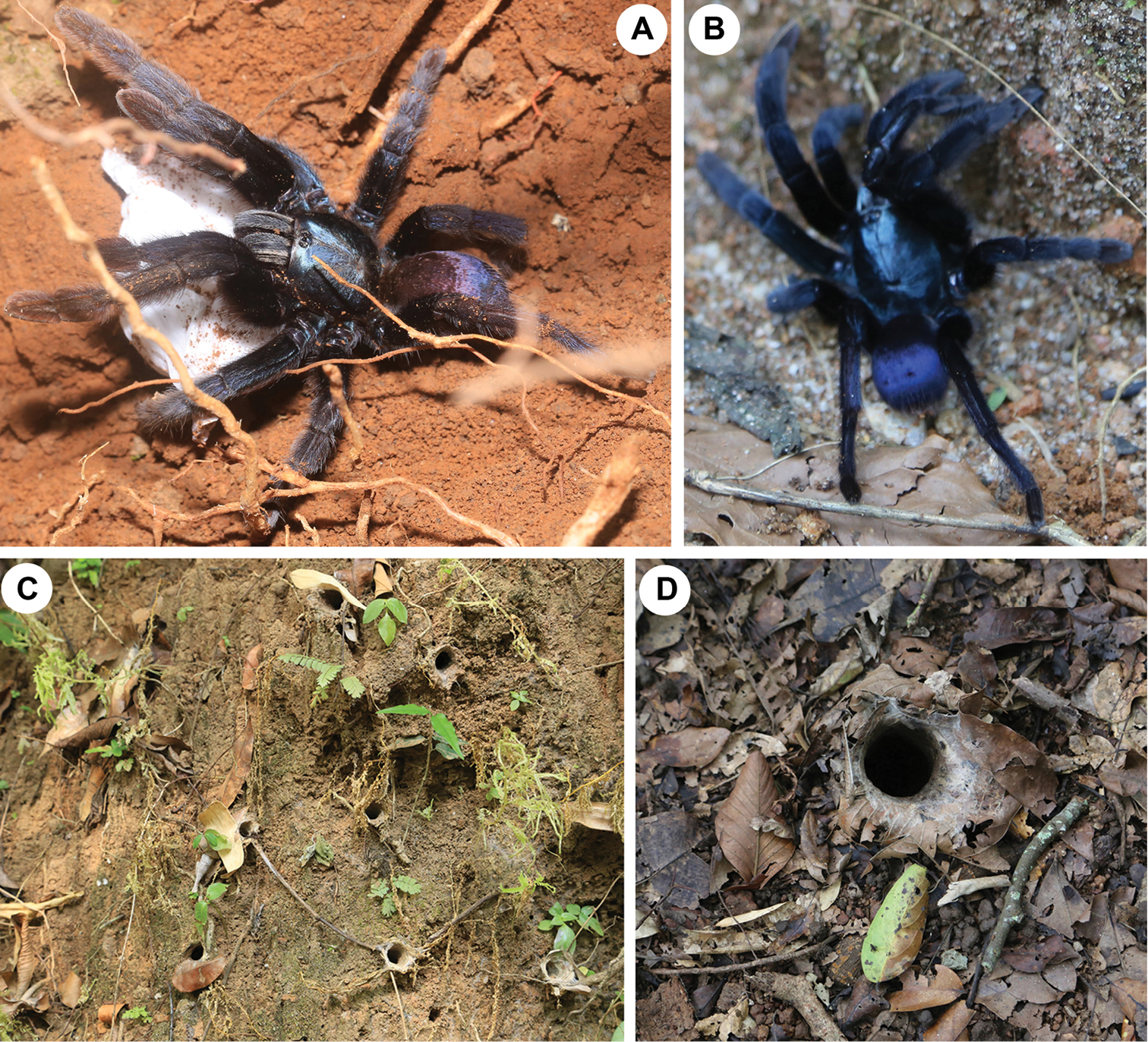
Haploclastus devamatha Prasanth & Jose, 2014 A female with egg sac from Thenmala (pink form), dorso-retrolateral B female from Thenmala (blue form), dorsal C active burrows of juveniles on the road side mud embankment, Thenmala D active burrow of adult female on the forest floor, Kulathupuzha Forest Reserve.

Haploclastus is a genus of Indian tarantulas (family Theraphosidae) that was first described by Eugène Simon in 1892. The genus Phlogiodes has been synonymized with Haploclastus by some authors.

== Description ==
They can be distinguished by the deep and procured fovea, with horizontal thornlike hairs in two or three rows above and below the maxillary. These hairs have a long tapering, they are modified and aligned vertically in a "diffuse" pattern on the maxilla.

== Taxonomy ==
The genus Haploclastus was first described by Eugène Simon in 1892. In 1899, Reginald Pocock erected the genus Phlogiodes. He described two species, Phlogiodes validus from a male specimen and Phlogiodes robustus from a female specimen. The relationship between the genera Haploclastus and Phlogiodes has varied; in 1985, Raven sank Phlogiodes into Haploclastus. In 2010, the two Phlogiodes species were synonymized and transferred to Haploclastus as Haploclastus validus. In 2013, H. validus was restored to Phlogiodes, the placement accepted by the World Spider Catalog as of January 2025.

=== Species ===
As of January 2025, the World Spider Catalog accepted seven species, all found in India:

- Haploclastus ajithii Mirza, 2024 – India
- Haploclastus bratocolonus Mirza, 2024 – India
- Haploclastus cervinus Simon, 1892 (type) – India
- Haploclastus montanus Mirza, 2024 – India
- Haploclastus nilgirinus Pocock, 1899 – India
- Haploclastus satyanus (Barman, 1978) – India
- Haploclastus tenebrosus Gravely, 1935 – India

=== Transferred to other genera ===
- Haploclastus himalayensis (Tikader, 1977) → Chilobrachys himalayensis
- Haploclastus devamatha (Prasanth & Sunil Jose, 2014) → Cilantica devamatha
- Haploclastus kayi (Gravely, 1915) → Cilantica kayi
- Haploclastus validus (Pocock, 1899), syn. H. robustus (Pocock, 1899) → Phlogiodes validus
