= Eastern Cordillera Real montane forests =

Ecoregion in South America

Eastern Cordillera Real montane forests (NT0121)
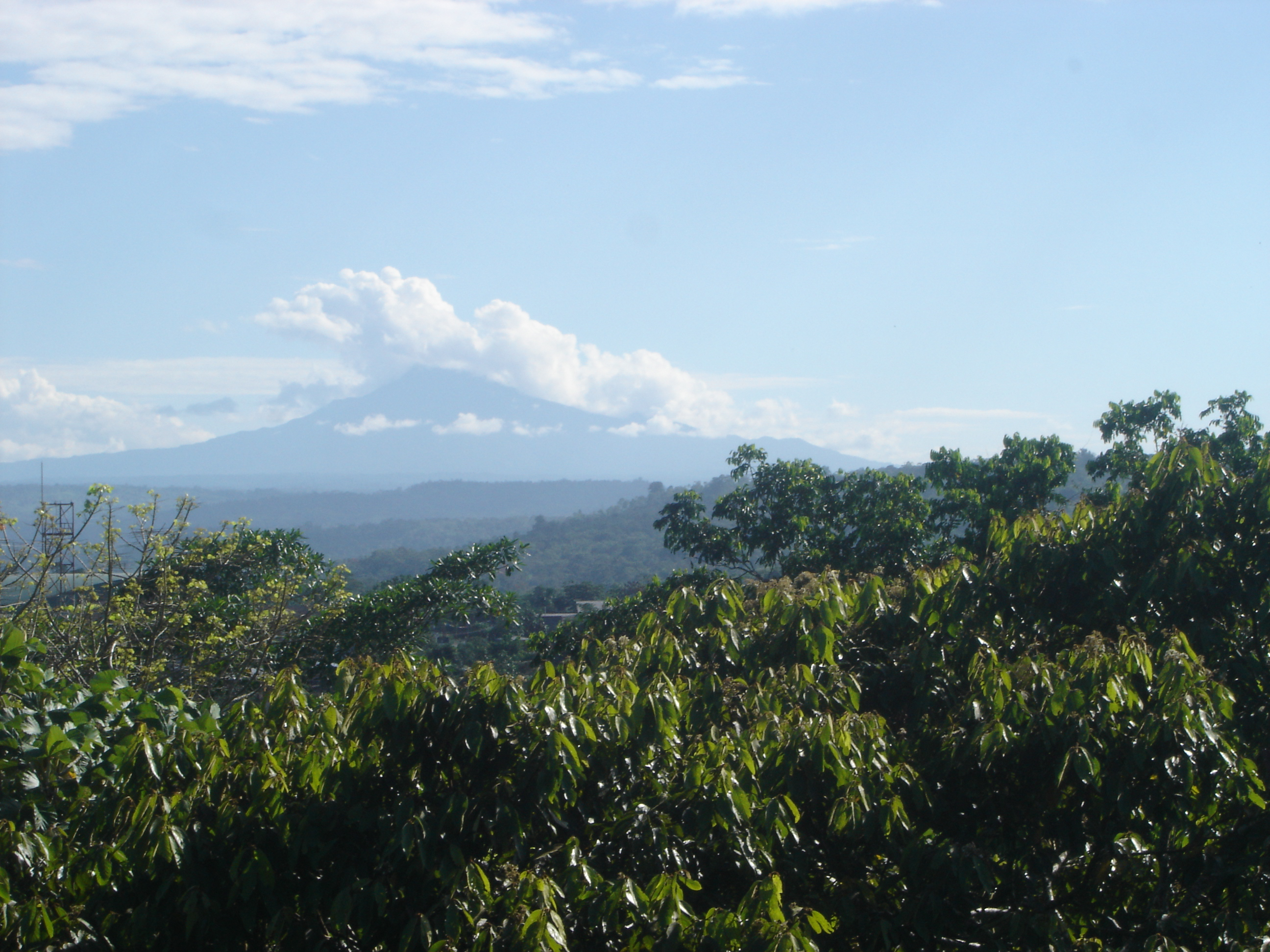
- Sumaco volcano viewed from Tena

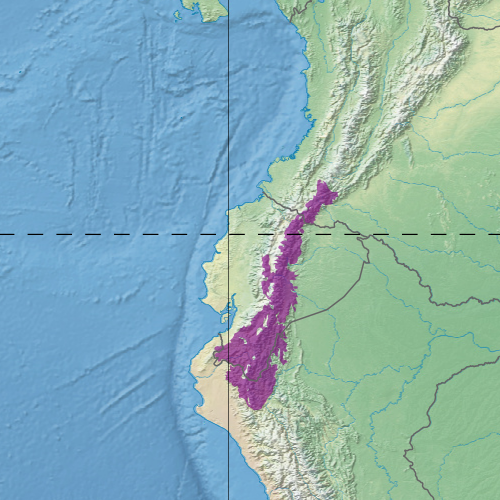
- Ecoregion territory (in purple)

Ecology
- Realm: Neotropical
- Biome: Tropical and subtropical moist broadleaf forests

Geography
- Area: 102,565 km^{2} (39,601 sq mi)
- Countries: Colombia, Ecuador, Peru
- Coordinates: 1.927°S 78.127°W
- Climate type: Aw (equatorial; winter dry)

The Eastern Cordillera Real montane forests (NT0121) is an ecoregion in the eastern range of the Andes of southern Colombia, Ecuador and northern Peru. The ecoregion covers the eastern slopes of the Andes, and includes montane forest that rises from the Amazonian rain forest, with cloud forest and elfin forest at higher elevations. It is rich in species, including many endemics. It is threatened by logging and conversion for pasturage and subsistence agriculture.

== Geography ==
=== Location ===
The ecoregion is on the eastern slopes of the central Andes. The forests cover an almost continuous band about 1,500 kilometres (930 mi) long but sometimes no more than 30 kilometres (19 mi) wide due to the limited area of the slopes with suitable elevations. They extend along the southern part of the Cordillera Oriental of Colombia, the eastern part of the Cordillera Real of Ecuador and the northern part of the Andes of Peru. The ecoregion has an area of 10,256,352 hectares (25,344,000 acres). (Note: The World Wide Fund for Nature gives the area of the ecoregion as 39,600 square miles (103,000 km^{2}) and elsewhere as 84,442 square kilometres (32,603 sq mi).)

In the extreme north the ecoregion transitions into the Magdalena Valley montane forests and Cordillera Oriental montane forests ecoregions. The north and central parts of the ecoregion merge into the Napo moist forests to the east and the Northwestern Andean montane forests to the west. The southern part transitions into the Ucayali moist forests to the east, Marañón dry forests to the south and Tumbes–Piura dry forests to the west. The north and central parts of the ecoregion adjoin or surround regions of Northern Andean páramo at the upper levels, and the southern part surrounds regions of Cordillera Central páramo.

=== Terrain ===
The ecoregion covers rugged premontane terrain on the eastern slopes of the Andes with elevations that range from 900 metres (3,000 ft) to above 2,100 metres (6,900 ft). In Peru part of the ecoregion extends west to the Pacific slope. The southern part of the Cordillera Real contains the Huancabamba Depression, the lowest pass in the Andes at about 2,000 metres (6,600 ft) above sea level. The mountains south of the Huancabamba Depression were mostly formed in the Miocene (23–5.3 Ma (Note: Ma – Million years ago)) while the mountains to the north formed between the end of the Pliocene (5.3–2.6 Ma) and the Pleistocene (2.6 Ma to 11,700 years ago).

The Pacific slope forests in Peru have a dry, seasonal climate and are mostly small patches of woods with relatively few species, but several endemic species. On the eastern, Amazon side of the Andes the montane forests start around 1,500 metres (4,900 ft) and receive plentiful rainfall from moist air from the Amazon basin.

=== Climate ===
The ecoregion gets 1,500 to 2,000 millimetres (59 to 79 in) of rain in a typical year, but in some years may get up to 4,500 millimetres (180 in). At a sample location at coordinates 2.75°S 78.25°W the Köppen climate classification is Aw (equatorial; winter dry). Mean temperatures vary from 19 °C (66 °F) in July to 20.2 °C (68.4 °F) in April. Yearly total precipitation is about 2,400 millimetres (94 in). Monthly precipitation varies from 130.7 millimetres (5.15 in) in August to 263.5 millimetres (10.37 in) in March.

== Ecology ==
The ecoregion is in the neotropical realm, in the tropical and subtropical moist broadleaf forests biome. The ecoregion is part of the Northern Andean Montane Forests global ecoregion, which includes the Magdalena Valley montane forests, Venezuelan Andes montane forests, Northwestern Andean montane forests, Cauca Valley montane forests, Cordillera Oriental montane forests, Santa Marta montane forests and Eastern Cordillera real montane forests terrestrial ecoregions. The Huancabamba Depression allows movement of species between the Pacific lowlands and the Amazon region, and has great influence on the ecoregion's flora and fauna, which have elements from the Amazon rainforest, the Inter-Andean dry forests and the hills of southern Ecuador. The ecoregion affects migration of species and formation of species, and has marked local endemism, notably in the Cajamarca Region of Peru.

=== Flora ===
Vegetation consists of evergreen broadleaf forest, with the composition varying considerably depending on elevation. In the lower areas (ceja de montaña) the forests is closed and exuberant. Higher up the trees are lower, and transition into cloud forest and then into elfin woodland. There are various species specialized to a given altitude, some of which are endemic due to physical barriers to mobility. The montane forests may once have held 30,000 to 40,000 species of flora, more than are found in the Amazon basin.

=== Fauna ===
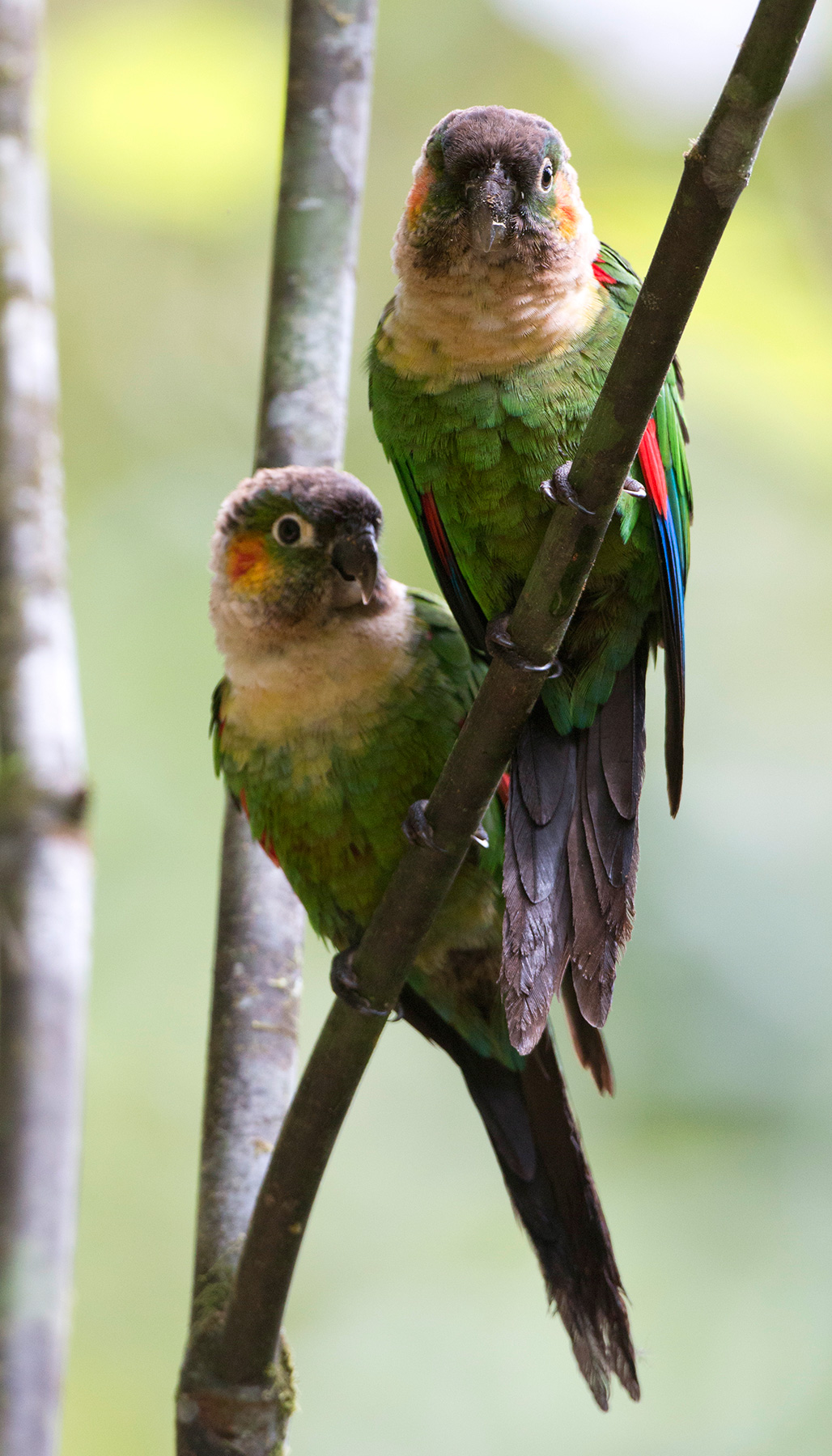
The white-breasted parakeet (Pyrrhura albipectus) is vulnerable.

Mammal species include Venezuelan red howler (Alouatta seniculus), white-fronted capuchin (Cebus albifrons), yellow-tailed woolly monkey (Oreonax flavicauda), spectacled bear (Tremarctos ornatus), taruca (Hippocamelus antisensis), guanaco (Lama guanicoe), kinkajou (Potos flavus) and perhaps mountain tapir (Tapirus pinchaque). A 1982 study of bats showed that 37% of the species found on the western slopes were endemic. Endangered mammals include equatorial dog-faced bat (Molossops aequatorianus), giant otter (Pteronura brasiliensis), mountain tapir (Tapirus pinchaque) and white-bellied spider monkey (Ateles belzebuth).

Bird species include masked mountain tanager (Buthraupis wetmorei), chestnut-bellied cotinga (Doliornis remseni), cinnamon screech owl (Megascops petersoni), neblina metaltail (Metallura odomae) and Andean condor (Vultur gryphus). Endangered and endemic birds include white-breasted parakeet (Pyrrhura albipectus), coppery-chested jacamar (Galbula pastazae), and bicolored antvireo (Dysithamnus occidentalis). Other endangered birds include royal sunangel (Heliangelus regalis) and black-and-chestnut eagle (Spizaetus isidori).

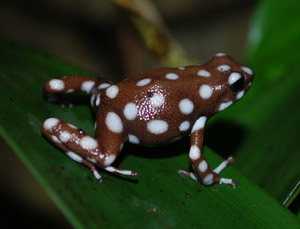
Marañón poison frog (Excidobates mysteriosus)

Endangered reptiles include Catamayo Coral Snake (Micrurus catamayensis), Lojan lancehead (Bothrops lojanus), Parker's Pholiodobolus (Macropholidus annectens), Parker's Ground Snake (Atractus carrioni), Riama balneator and Riama petrorum. Endangered amphibians include:

- Kingsbury's rocket frog (Allobates kingsburyi)
- Azuay stubfoot toad (Atelopus bomolochos)
- Boulenger's stubfoot toad (Atelopus boulengeri)
- Morona-Santiago stubfoot toad (Atelopus halihelos)
- Gualecenita stubfoot toad (Atelopus nepiozomus)
- Schmidt's stubfoot toad (Atelopus pachydermus)
- Flat-spined Atelopus (Atelopus planispina)
- Amazon giant glass frog (Centrolene pipilatum)
- Phantasmal poison frog (Epipedobates tricolor)
- Napo giant glass frog (Espadarana audax)
- Marañón poison frog (Excidobates mysteriosus)
- North shore marsupial frog (Gastrotheca espeletia)
- Papallacta marsupial frog (Gastrotheca orophylax)
- Ridge marsupial frog (Gastrotheca psychrophila)
- Andean marsupial tree frog (Gastrotheca riobambae)
- Rio Chingual Valley tree frog (Hyloscirtus pantostictus)
- Papallacta tree frog (Hyloscirtus psarolaimus)
- Jondachi tree frog (Hyloscirtus staufferorum)
- South American rocket frog (Hyloxalus anthracinus)
- Palanda rocket frog (Hyloxalus cevallosi)
- Loja rocket frog (Hyloxalus elachyhistus)
- Carchi Andes frog (Hypodactylus brunneus)
- Cuyuja robber frog (Hypodactylus elassodiscus)
- Parker's Andes Frog (Lynchius parkeri)
- Napo Cochran frog (Nymphargus anomalus)
- Santa Rosa Cochran frog (Nymphargus megacheirus)
- Puyo giant glass frog (Nymphargus puyoensis)
- Napo plump toad (Osornophryne antisana)
- Guacamayo plump toad (Osornophryne guacamayo)
- Agua Rica leaf frog (Phyllomedusa ecuatoriana
- Papallacta robber frog (Pristimantis acerus)
- Santiago robber frog (Pristimantis atratus)
- Crest robber frog (Pristimantis balionotus)
- Rio Reventador robber frog (Pristimantis cremnobates)
- Cryptic robber frog (Pristimantis cryptomelas)
- De Ville's robber frog (Pristimantis devillei)
- Festa shy robber frog Pristimantis festae
- Papallacta Valley robber frog (Pristimantis gladiator)
- Ecuador robber frog (Pristimantis glandulosus)
- Fire robber frog (Pristimantis ignicolor)
- Rio Azuela robber frog (Pristimantis incanus)
- El cutín del Puyo (Pristimantis katoptroides)
- Pristimantis lividus
- Urdaneta robber frog (Pristimantis orestes)
- Pristimantis pastazensis
- Zamora robber frog (Pristimantis percultus)
- Hidden robber frog (Pristimantis prolatus)
- Sapote Robber Frog (Pristimantis proserpens)
- Pristimantis pycnodermis
- Canchaque Robber Frog (Pristimantis rhodoplichus)
- Trench robber frog (Pristimantis rubicundus)
- Mountain crest robber frog (Pristimantis vidua)
- Loja water frog (Telmatobius cirrhacelis)
- Piura water frog (Telmatobius ignavus)
- Vellard's water frog (Telmatobius vellardi)

== Status ==
The World Wide Fund for Nature (WWF) gives the region the status of "Vulnerable". The forest are fairly accessible, and are increasingly threatened by logging of commercially valuable Podocarpus and Prumnopitys species. Large areas of the original forest have been cleared for pasturage or subsistence agriculture, or replaced by thickets. Protected areas include the Cayambe Coca Ecological Reserve, Podocarpus National Park and Noroeste Biosphere Reserve.

== Sources ==
- "Eastern Cordillera real montane forests", Global Species, Myers Enterprises II, archived from the original on 2018-11-04
- Juan Carlos Riveros Salcedo, Eastern South America: Ecuador into Colombia and Peru, WWF
- Northern Andean Montane Forests, WWF Global
- WildFinder, WWF: World Wildlife Fund
