= Northern Andean páramo =

Ecoregion in South America

Northern Andean páramo (NT1006)
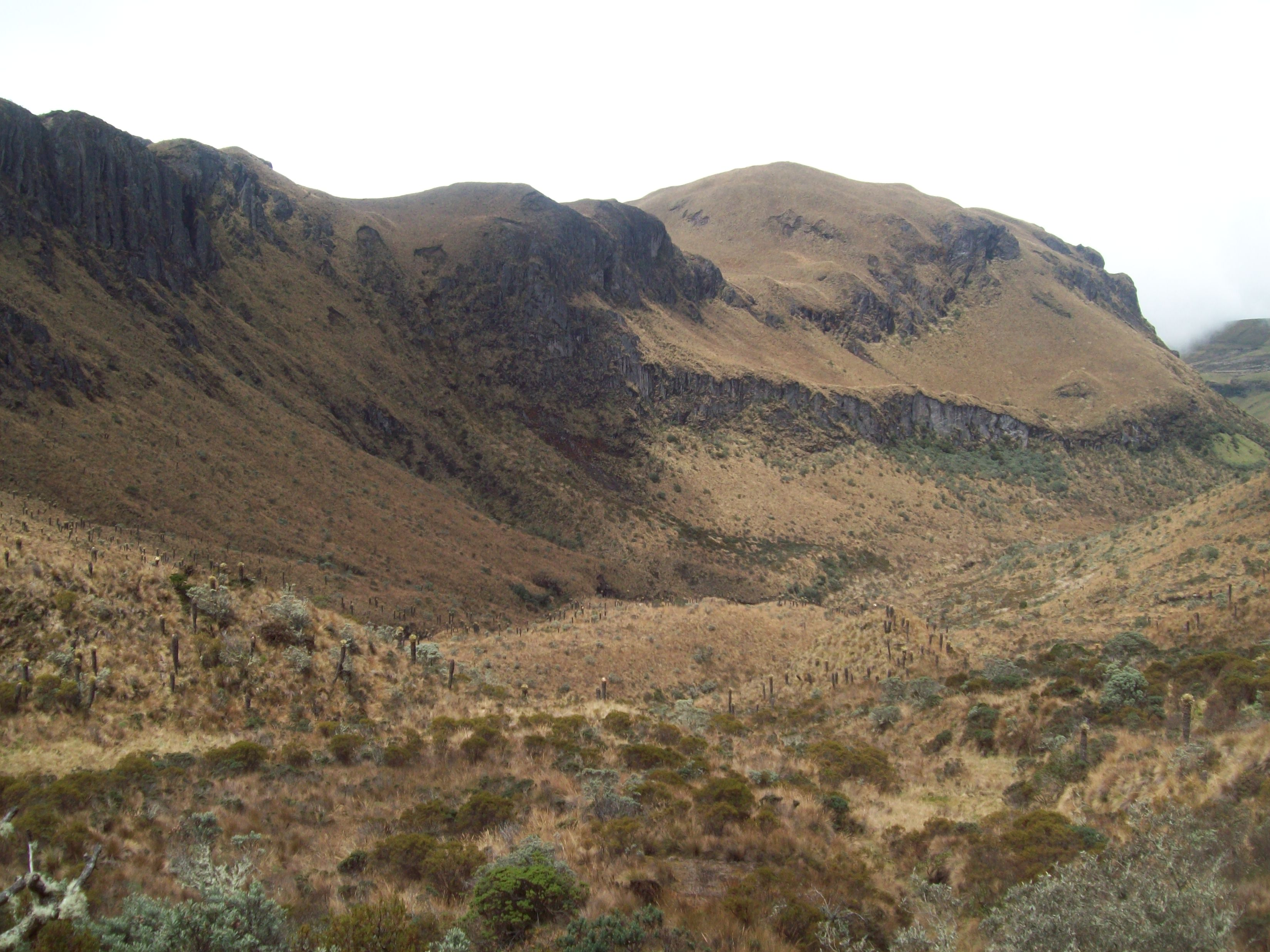
- Landscape in Nevado del Ruiz, Colombia

- Location in northwest South America (purple shading)

Ecology
- Realm: Neotropical
- Biome: Montane grasslands and shrublands

Geography
- Area: 30,044 km^{2} (11,600 mi^{2})
- Countries: Colombia, Ecuador
- Coordinates: 2.344°N 76.384°W
- Climate type: Cfb warm temperate; fully humid; warm summer

The Northern Andean páramo (NT1006) is an ecoregion containing páramo vegetation above the treeline in the Andes of Colombia and Ecuador. In the past, when the climate was cooler, the treeline and the páramo units were lower and the units were connected. During the present warmer Holocene epoch the páramos have migrated uphill, shrinking and becoming isolated. They contain many rare or endangered species, some of them restricted to a narrow area of one mountain or mountain range. The ecoregion is relatively well preserved, but faces threats from over-grazing and farming.

== Geography ==
=== Location ===
The Northern Andean páramo surrounds the highest peaks of the Andes between the treeline and the snowline from north central Colombia along the cordilleras south to central Ecuador. It has an area of 3,004,386 hectares (7,424,000 acres). The páramo is found at elevations from 3,000–3,500 metres (9,800–11,500 ft) to the snow line at 5,000 metres (16,000 ft), islands of grasslands and shrubs surrounded by a sea of cloud forest lower down. Areas of the ecoregion are found within or adjoining the Apure–Villavicencio dry forests, Cordillera Oriental montane forests, Magdalena Valley montane forests, Magdalena Valley dry forests, Northwestern Andean montane forests and Eastern Cordillera Real montane forests.

=== Soils ===
There are many types of soil due to the diverse geology of the Andes, but most are fairly young. They include andosols, inceptisols, histosols, entisols and mollisols. At the lowest levels, the subpáramo, soils are dark, low in acid, low in calcium and free phosphorus, fairly high in potassium and nitrogen, with more than 10% organic matter in the top layer. At the middle levels, the grass páramo, soils are fairly deep and are dark in color, acidic, moist or saturated with water, rich in organic matter and peat-like. At the highest levels, known as the superpáramo, soils are shallow and coarse, with much rock and sand and little organic matter. They do not retain water and are highly infertile.

=== Climate ===
The Köppen climate classification is "Cfb": warm temperate; fully humid; warm summer. The páramos of Colombia and the north of Ecuador are generally humid throughout the year with moisture delivered in the form of rain, clouds and fog as air masses are lifted up over the mountains. Annual rainfall ranges from 500 to 3,000 millimetres (20 to 118 in). This differs from the Costa Rican páramo, Santa Marta páramo and Venezuelan páramo, where the northeast trade winds create a distinct dry season. It also differs from the páramos in the south of Ecuador and north of Peru, which are drier. The Northern Andean páramos experience temperatures that may drop below freezing at night and rise to 30 °C (86 °F) during the day. Rain, snow and fog may alternative with sunny skies and high temperatures in the course of a day.

== Ecology ==
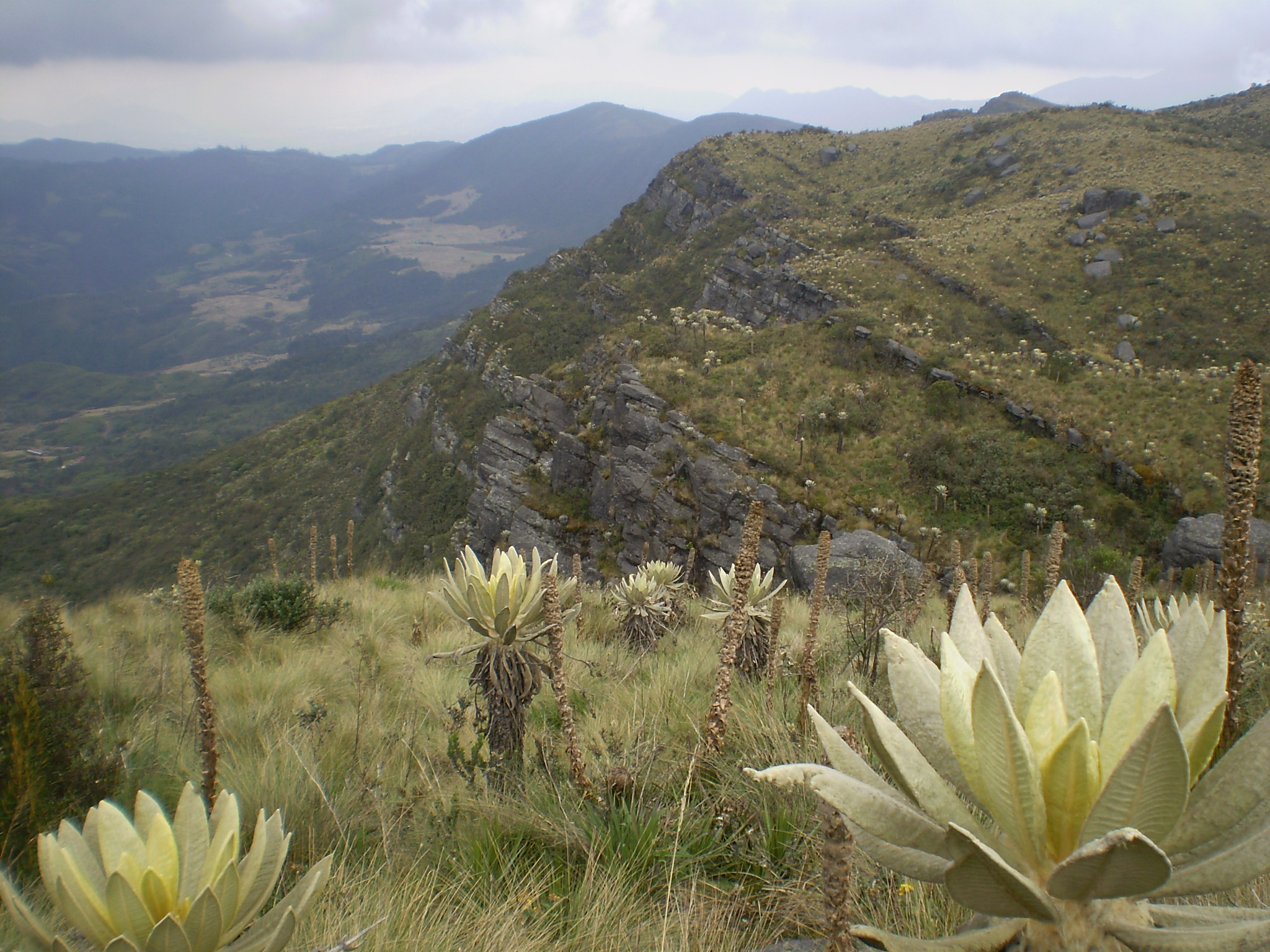
Guerrero páramo in the Cordillera Oriental province

The Northern Andean páramo ecoregion is in the neotropical realm, in the montane grasslands and shrublands biome. The ecoregion is part of the Northern Andean Paramo global ecoregion, which also includes the Cordillera Central páramo, Santa Marta páramo and Cordillera de Merida páramo terrestrial ecoregions. The plants and animals are adapted to the cold, dry conditions of the high peaks. There is a high level of local endemism, particularly on the more isolated peaks.

=== Origins ===
The Andes began to rise in the Miocene epoch, but in the north did not reach their present height until the Pliocene between four and five million years ago. At this time the land rose above the tree line and the protopáramo vegetation developed with new species of families such as Poaceae, Cyperaceae, Asteraceae, Ericaceae. During the later parts of the Quaternary epoch a series of short, cold and dry glacial periods alternated with warmer and more humid interglacial periods. The páramo belts moved lower and joined in the cold periods, and moved higher into unconnected enclaves when the temperatures rose. The result is a mix of species of tropical and boreal origin with the same genera found in most páramos, but with many endemic species in the individual páramos.

As recently as 14,000 years ago the temperatures were 6–7 °C (11–13 °F) below those of today, and the páramo belt began at an elevation of 2,000 metres (6,600 ft). It covered a much larger area than it does today, and most of today's isolated areas of páramo were connected. The warming that began about 10,000 years ago at the start of the Holocene epoch caused the forest line to rise, pushing the páramo belt upward and reducing its area. Cooling that started around 2,900 years ago caused the belts to move down towards their present positions. This picture may be simplistic, since species that are less sensitive to temperature changes may have moved less than those that are more sensitive, so the composition of the belts may have changed.

=== Provinces ===
A 2013 analysis of the páramo units in Colombia evaluated similarities between their endemic flora. It found that the units naturally formed into five biogeographical provinces:

	Province	Páramos
A	Páramos de la Cordillera Oriental	Almorzadero; Jurisdicciones–Santurbán; Chingaza; Cruz Verde–Sumapaz; Guerrero; Cocuy; Guantiva–La Rusia; Tota–Bijagual–Mamapacha; Iguaque–Merchán; Rabanal y Río Bogotá; Pisba
B	Páramos del Macizo and Cordillera Central	Chiles–Cumbal; Doña Juana–Chimayoy; La Cocha–Patascoy; Guanacas–Puracé–Coconucos; Los Nevados; Sotara; Chili–Barragán; Las Hermosas; Nevado del Huila–Moras
C	Páramos de Antioquia	Belmira; Frontino–Urrao; Sonsón; Paramillo
D	Páramos del Norte	Perijá; Santa Marta
E	Páramos de la Cordillera Occidental	Farallones de Cali; Tatamá; The geographically related Duende complex

The definition of the Páramos del Norte province differs from the traditional grouping, where the Santa Marta páramo is treated as a separate ecoregion and the Perijá páramo is included in the Cordillera Oriental province. The flora of these two is closer to the Páramos de Chirripó of Central America than to the rest of the Northern Andean páramo, despite their being separated by the Cesar River valley. The Páramos del Macizo and Cordillera Central province shared many species with the Ecuador páramos, confirming the grouping of the Ecuador and central-south Colombia páramos in one ecoregion.

=== Flora ===
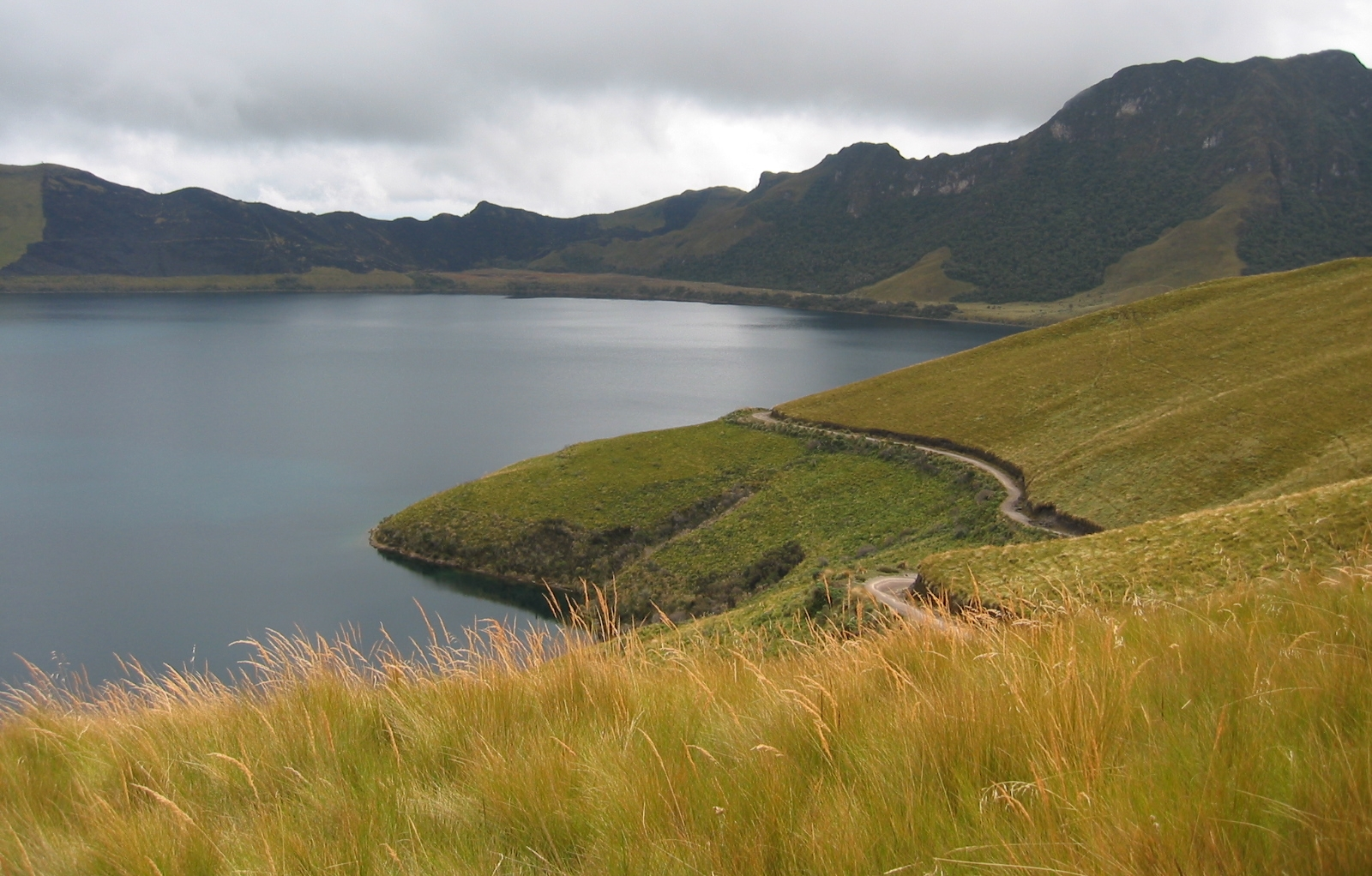
Páramo vegetation around the Mojanda caldera in northern Ecuador

Vegetation consists of high alpine grasslands, bogs and open meadows. The boundary between the treeline and the páramo is usually higher on the wetter, windward side of the mountains. The treeless grasslands of the páramo are probably man-made, and preserved through cutting, burning and grazing. In earlier times the transition from forest to grassland was probably higher and less abrupt. The flora are mostly recent species that have emerged in the last 4 million years. The páramos have plants of the same genera, but have highly endemic species. 86% of flowering plant species are endemic to the ecosystem.

The subpáramo is the transition between the forest and grasslands at around 3,000–3,500 metres (9,800–11,500 ft) of elevation. It contains small, scattered trees, giving way to scrub, dwarf shrubs, grasses and herb. Grass páramo grows at altitudes of about 3,500–4,100 metres (11,500–13,500 ft) and mostly contains tussock grass or bunch grass of Calamagrostis or Festuca species. It also contains a great variety of small herbs. There are also rocky areas and areas of swamp, bog or marsh with unique flora. At the highest levels superpáramo vegetation is adapted to the harshest conditions, has very high endemism, and holds very small plants, gymnosperms, mosses and lichens.

=== Fauna ===
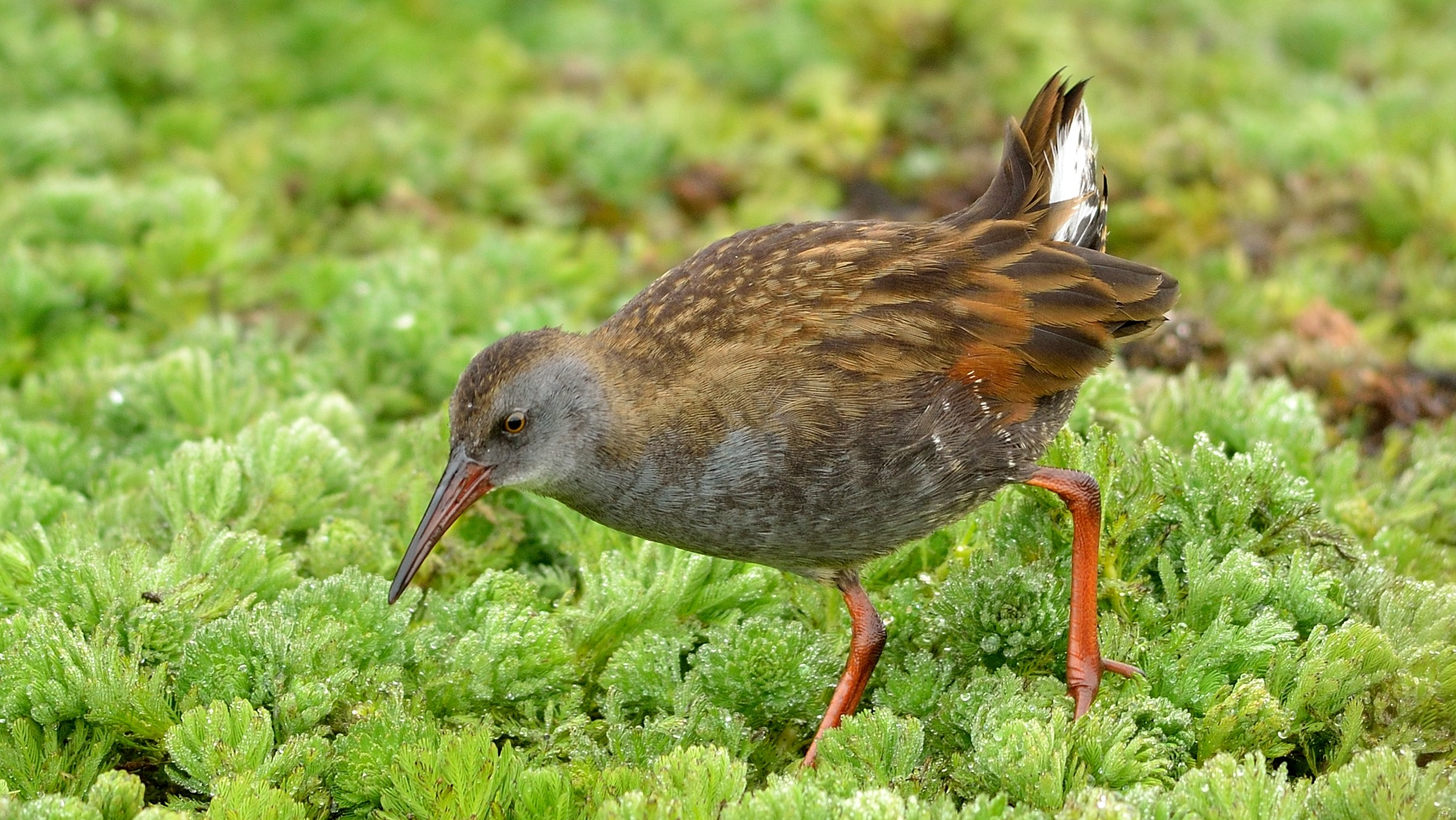
Endangered Bogotá rail (Rallus semiplumbeus)

Endangered mammals include Hammond's rice rat (Mindomys hammondi), mountain tapir (Tapirus pinchaque) and woodland Oldfield mouse (Thomasomys hylophilus). Endangered reptiles include Colombian lightbulb lizard (Riama columbiana) and Riama petrorum. Endangered birds include Apolinar's wren (Cistothorus apolinari), black-breasted puffleg (Eriocnemis nigrivestis) and Bogotá rail (Rallus semiplumbeus).

Endangered amphibians include the painted frogs Atelopus arthuri, A. bomolochos, A. ebenoides, A. exiguus, A. muisca and A. pachydermus, the poison dart frog Colostethus jacobuspetersi, the marsupial frogs Gastrotheca espeletia, G. litonedis, G. orophylax, G. pseustes and G. riobambae, the treefrog Hyloscirtus psarolaimus, the rocket frogs Hyloxalus anthracinus, H. delatorreae, H. edwardsi, H. vertebralis, the Boqueron robber frog Hypodactylus latens, the Niceforonia adenobrachia, the plump toads Osornophryne percrassa and O. talipes, the robber frogs Pristimantis atratus, P. baryecuus, P. cryophilius, P. cryptomelas, P. devillei, P. gentryi, P. mnionaetes, P. modipeplus, P. ocreatus, P. orestes, P. pycnodermis, P. pyrrhomerus, P. simonbolivari, P. simoteriscus, P. surdus, P. thymalopsoides and P. truebae and the black water frog Telmatobius niger.

== Status ==
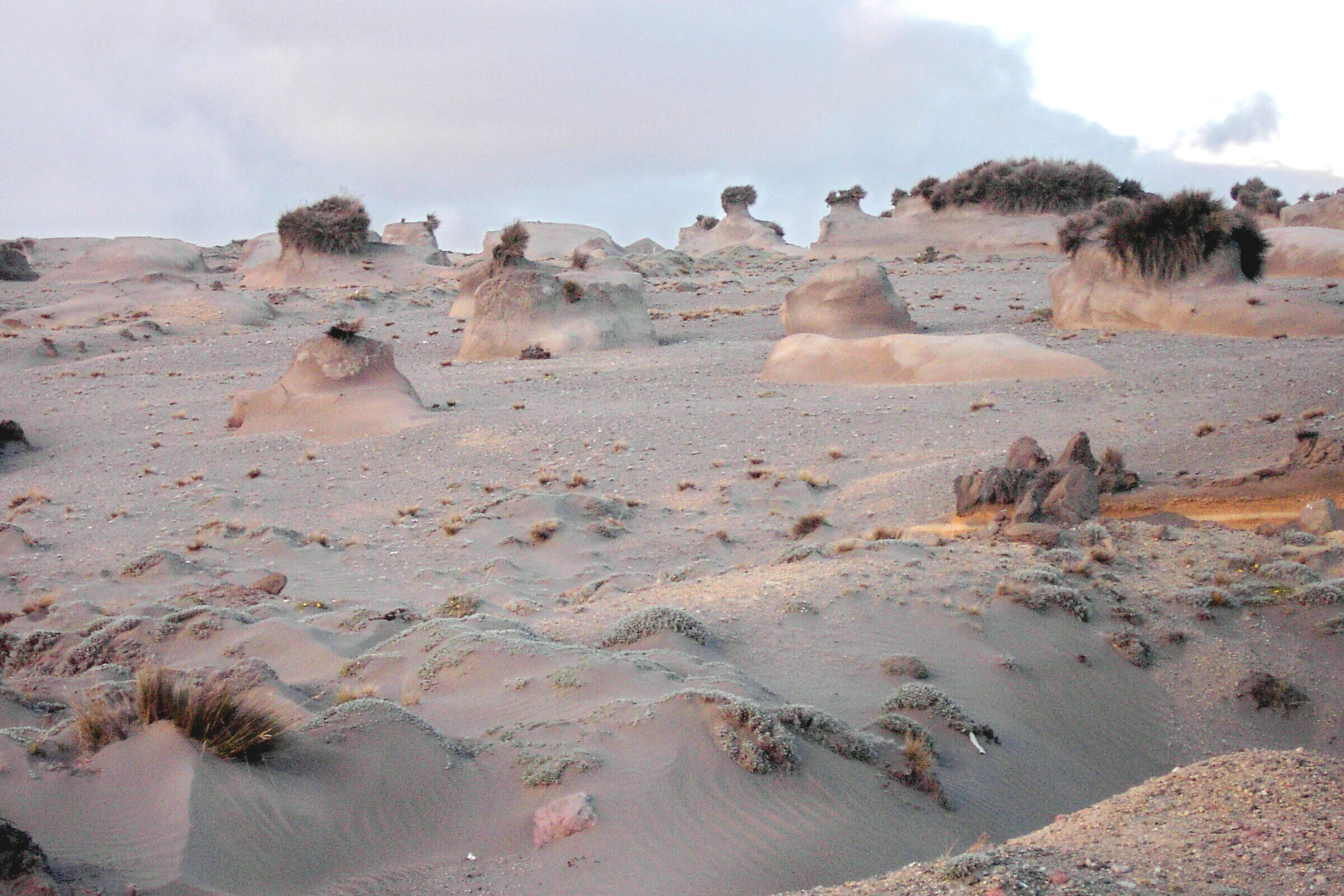
Erosion of the páramo at Chimborazo, Ecuador, due to over-grazing and wind

The World Wildlife Fund gives the Northern Andean páramo the status of "Relatively Stable/Intact". The páramo is a major source of water for the Andean highlands and large parts of the adjacent lowlands, providing a sustainable flow of rivers with high quality water. Humans have been present in the páramo since the pre-Columbian period, but often did no more than allow their animals to graze freely. More recently the limit with the natural forest has been drastically changed by logging and intensive grazing, and it is hard to distinguish between natural and artificial grasslands. There has been an increase in cultivation, more intense grazing by livestock, pine plantations and tourism, all of which may affect the hydrological properties of the páramo. In some areas there is intensive potato and bean cultivation, which requires drainage of the waterlogged soils. Mining has been restricted.

Protected areas include the Cayambe-Coca Ecological Reserve and the Cinturon Andino Cluster Biosphere Reserve. Other conservation units are the Chingaza National Natural Park, Sumapaz Páramo National Park, Sierra Nevada del Cocuy Chita o Guican National Natural Park, Lake Iguaque Flora and Fauna Sanctuary, Los Nevados National Natural Park and Las Hermosas National Natural Park.

== Sources ==
- Buytaert, Wouter; Célleri, Rolando; De Bièvre, Bert; Cisneros, Felipe; Wyseure, Guido; Deckers, Jozef; Hofsted, Robert (2006), "Human impact on the hydrology of the Andean páramos" (PDF), Earth-Science Reviews, 79, Elsevier
- Klein, Brad, Western South America: Central Ecuador into Colombia (NT1006), WWF: World Wildlife Fund
- Londoño, Camilo; Cleef, Antoine; Madriñán, Santiago (February 2014), "Angiosperm flora and biogeography of the páramo region of Colombia, Northern Andes" (PDF), Flora - Morphology, Distribution, Functional Ecology of Plants, 209 (2), Elsevier, doi:10.1016/j.flora.2013.11.006
- Luteyn, James L., Páramo ecosystem, Missouri Botanical Garden
- "Northern Andean páramo", Global Species, Myers Enterprises II, archived from the original on 2017-04-18
- Northern Andean Paramo, WWF Global, archived from the original on 2017-02-05
- WildFinder, WWF: World Wildlife Fund
- Worboys, Graeme; Francis, Wendy L.; Lockwood, Michael (2010), Connectivity Conservation Management: A Global Guide (with Particular Reference to Mountain Connectivity Conservation), Earthscan, ISBN 978-1-84407-603-1
