= Papallacta frog =

Papallacta frog may refer to:

- Papallacta robber frog, a frog endemic to Ecuador
- Papallacta tree frog, a frog found in Colombia and Ecuador
