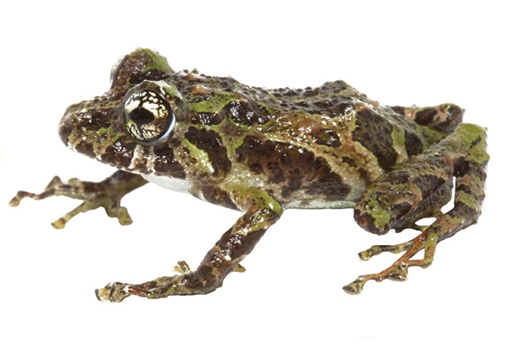

Conservation status
- Least Concern (IUCN 3.1)

Scientific classification
- Kingdom: Animalia
- Phylum: Chordata
- Class: Amphibia
- Order: Anura
- Family: Strabomantidae
- Genus: Pristimantis
- Subgenus: Pristimantis
- Species: P. katoptroides

Binomial name
- Pristimantis katoptroides (Flores, 1988)

Synonyms
- Eleutherodactylus katoptroides Flores, 1988

= Pristimantis katoptroides =

Species of frog

Pristimantis katoptroides is a species of frog in the family Strabomantidae. It is found in the eastern slopes of the Andes of Ecuador and Cordillera Central and eastern Andean foothills in northwestern Peru. The specific name katoptroides is Greek for "mirror-like" and refers to the similarity of this species to Pristimantis crucifer, but being found on the other side of the Andes. Common name Puyo robber frog has been proposed for it.

== Description ==
Adult males measure 19–28 mm (0.7–1.1 in) and adult females 24–33 mm (0.9–1.3 in) in snout–vent length (SVL). The snout is rounded in dorsal view and moderately long. The tympanum is half-concealed by the well-developed supratympanic fold. The fingers and the toes have large discs at their tips and vague (fingers) or narrow (toes), weakly crenelate lateral keels. Skin is dorsally finely tuberculate and ventrally areolate. The dorsal coloration varies from green to greenish brown with darker brown markings. The belly is white, sometimes with brown fringes. The groin and posterior surfaces of the thighs are deep blue to dark brown, sometimes with orange spots on the edges. The iris is pale yellow with black reticulation.

== Habitat and conservation ==
Pristimantis katoptroides occurs in montane and submontane cloud forests at elevations of 650–1,800 m (2,130–5,910 ft) above sea level. It can occur in both primary and secondary forests. Specimens can be found in understorey herbaceous vegetation as high as seven meters above the ground. Development is direct (i.e, there is no free-living larval stage).

Although considered generally rare, Pristimantis katoptroides is observed with some frequency in eastern Ecuador. Cattle grazing and mining activities can be local threats, but its presence in secondary forests suggests some degree of tolerance to human impacts. Chytridiomycosis has been identified in this species, but it is not considered a major threat. It is present in a number of protected areas, including the Podocarpus and Sangay National Parks in Ecuador and the Alto Mayo Protection Forest and Santiago-Comaina Reserved Zone in Peru.
