= Allobates kingsburyi =

Conservation status
- Least Concern (IUCN 3.1)

Scientific classification
- Kingdom: Animalia
- Phylum: Chordata
- Class: Amphibia
- Order: Anura
- Family: Aromobatidae
- Genus: Allobates
- Species: A. kingsburyi

Binomial name
- Allobates kingsburyi (Boulenger, 1918)

Synonyms
- Phyllobates kingsburyi Boulenger, 1918; Colostethus kingsburyi (Boulenger, 1918); Phyllobates intermedius Andersson, 1945

Species of frog

Allobates kingsburyi (common name: Kingsbury's rocket frog) is a species of frog in the family Aromobatidae. It is endemic to the Amazonian slopes of the Andes in Ecuador, near the Reventador volcano and in the Pastaza River trench.

== Description ==
The adult male frog measures 16.3–20.3 mm long in snout-vent length and the adult female frog 18.8–22.2 mm. The skin of the dorsum is coffee-brown in color with a cream-colored line down each side of the body. The flanks are black in color and the tympanum is brown. There is a cream-yellow line on each side of the body from the eye to the lip. The tops of the front legs are brown in color with small lines. The tops of the back legs are brown in color with darker marks. The male frog has dark marks on the belly and the female frog does not have these marks. The iris of the eye is black in color with gold flecks.

Juvenile frogs have wider stripes than adults.

== Etymology ==
G.A. Boulenger named this frog after an assistant who was killed in Palestine in 1918.

== Habitat ==
This frog has been observed on the leaf litter in primary and secondary forest from 1,140–1,300 m (3,740–4,270 ft) above sea level.

The frog's known range includes protected parks: Parque Nacional Sangay, Parque Nacional Podocarpus, Parque Nacional Llanganates, and Parque Nacional Cayambe Coca.

== Reproduction ==
Scientists believe the female frog lays her eggs on the ground and that the male frogs carry the tadpoles to streams after the eggs hatch.

== Threats ==
The IUCN classifies this frog as least concern of extinction. What threat it faces comes from habitat loss associated with agriculture, livestock cultivation, and logging.
