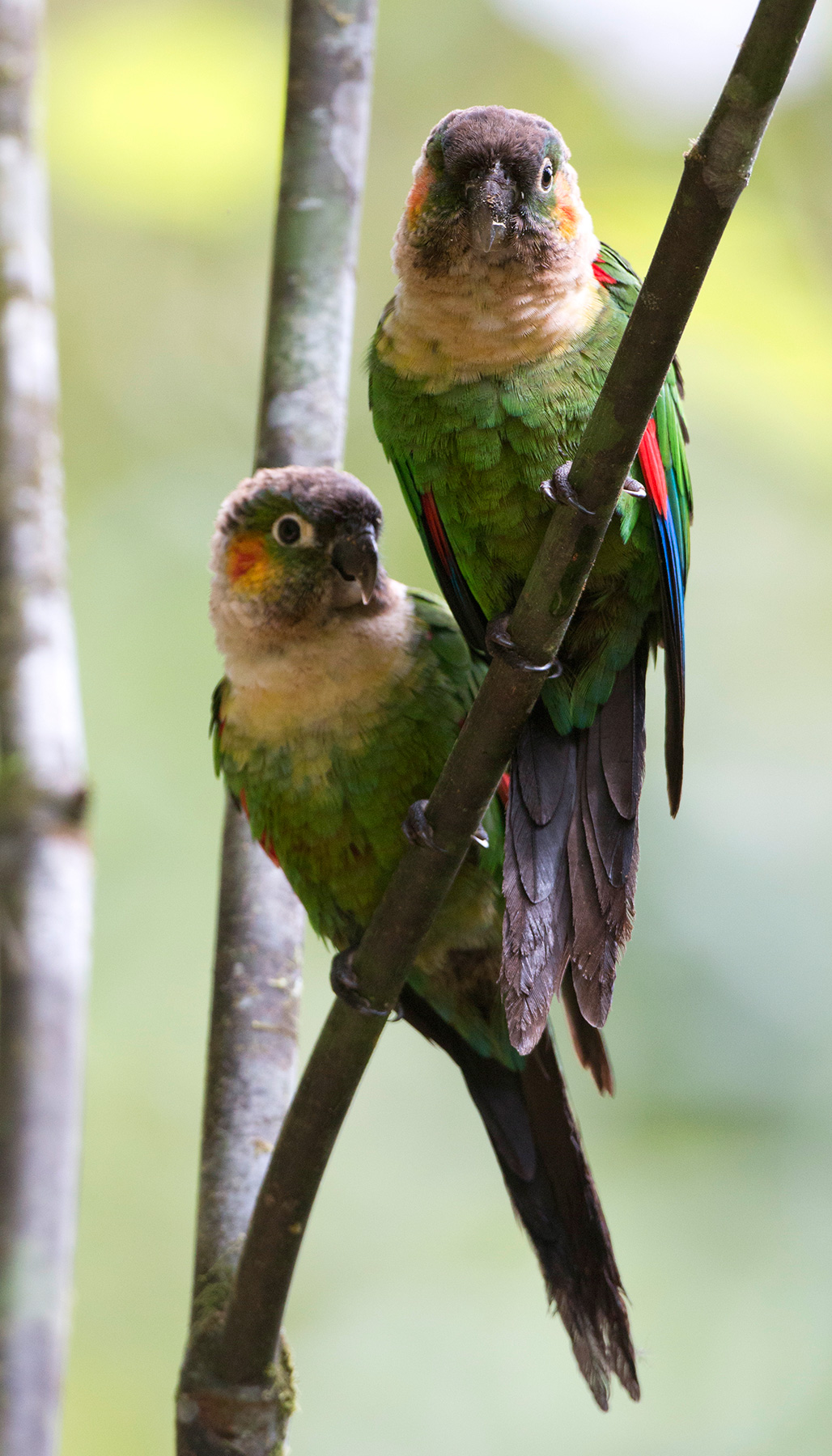

Conservation status
- Vulnerable (IUCN 3.1)
- CITES Appendix II

Scientific classification
- Kingdom: Animalia
- Phylum: Chordata
- Class: Aves
- Order: Psittaciformes
- Family: Psittacidae
- Genus: Pyrrhura
- Species: P. albipectus

Binomial name
- Pyrrhura albipectus Chapman, 1914

= White-breasted parakeet =

White-breasted Parakeet

Species of bird

The white-breasted parakeet (Pyrrhura albipectus) or white-necked parakeet, is a Vulnerable species of bird in subfamily Arinae of the family Psittacidae, the African and New World parrots. It is found in southern Ecuador and possibly in adjacent northern Peru.

== Taxonomy and systematics ==
The white-breasted parakeet is monotypic.

== Description ==
The white-breasted parakeet is 24 to 25.5 cm (9.4 to 10 in) long and weighs 83 to 110 g (2.9 to 3.9 oz). The sexes are the same. Adults have a thin reddish brown band just above the bill and are brownish from forehead to hindcrown; the crown feathers have gray edges. Their cheeks are green with yellow giving a scaly appearance and their ear coverts are orange. A wide white collar surrounds their neck and the rest of their upperparts are green. Their breast is yellow and the rest of their underparts are green with a rusty tone on the belly. Their wing is mostly green with red primary coverts and dark bluish primaries. The upper side of their tail is dull reddish with a green base and the underside dusky with reddish tips to the feathers. Their bill is blackish and their iris is dark with bare white or whitish skin surrounding it. Immature birds are similar to adults but without the reddish frontal band; they also have paler ear coverts and a white breast.

== Distribution and habitat ==
The white-breasted parakeet is found on the eastern slope of the Andes in the southeastern Ecuadoran provinces of Morona-Santiago and Zamora-Chinchipe, and possibly in northernmost Cajamarca in Peru. The South American Classification Committee of the American Ornithological Society considers it to be endemic to Ecuador; undocumented sight records in Peru lead the committee to treat it as hypothetical in that country. It inhabits the canopy, clearings, and edges of primary subtropical and tropical forest at elevations between 900 and 2,000 m (3,000 and 6,600 ft) though it usually is found below 1,700 m (5,600 ft).

== Behavior ==
=== Movement ===
The white-breasted parakeet is not known to have any pattern of movements.

=== Feeding ===
The white-breasted parakeet feeds on fruit, seeds, and flowers of a variety of plants and trees.

=== Breeding ===
The white-breasted parakeet nests between May and July, but nothing else is known about its breeding biology.

=== Vocalization ===
The white-breasted parakeet's most common call is "a series of harsh notes, e.g. "krree krree krree" " that is given both from a perch and in flight. Perched birds also call with single "kurree" or "rrah" notes, though perched birds are often silent. Flocks in flight "call frequently and simultaneously, producing a noisy, harsh chattering."

== Status ==
The IUCN originally assessed the white-breasted parakeet as Threatened but since 1994 has treated it as Vulnerable. It has a small range and its estimated population of under 10,000 mature individuals is believed to be decreasing. "Habitat destruction is the principal concern, as upper tropical zone forests east of the Andes are being cleared at an alarming rate." It occurs in Podocarpus National Park and the Tapichalaca Reserve, though the former has lost some habitat due to illegal encroachment. In Tapichalaca Reserve the Fundación Jocotoco has erected nest boxes for the parakeet.
