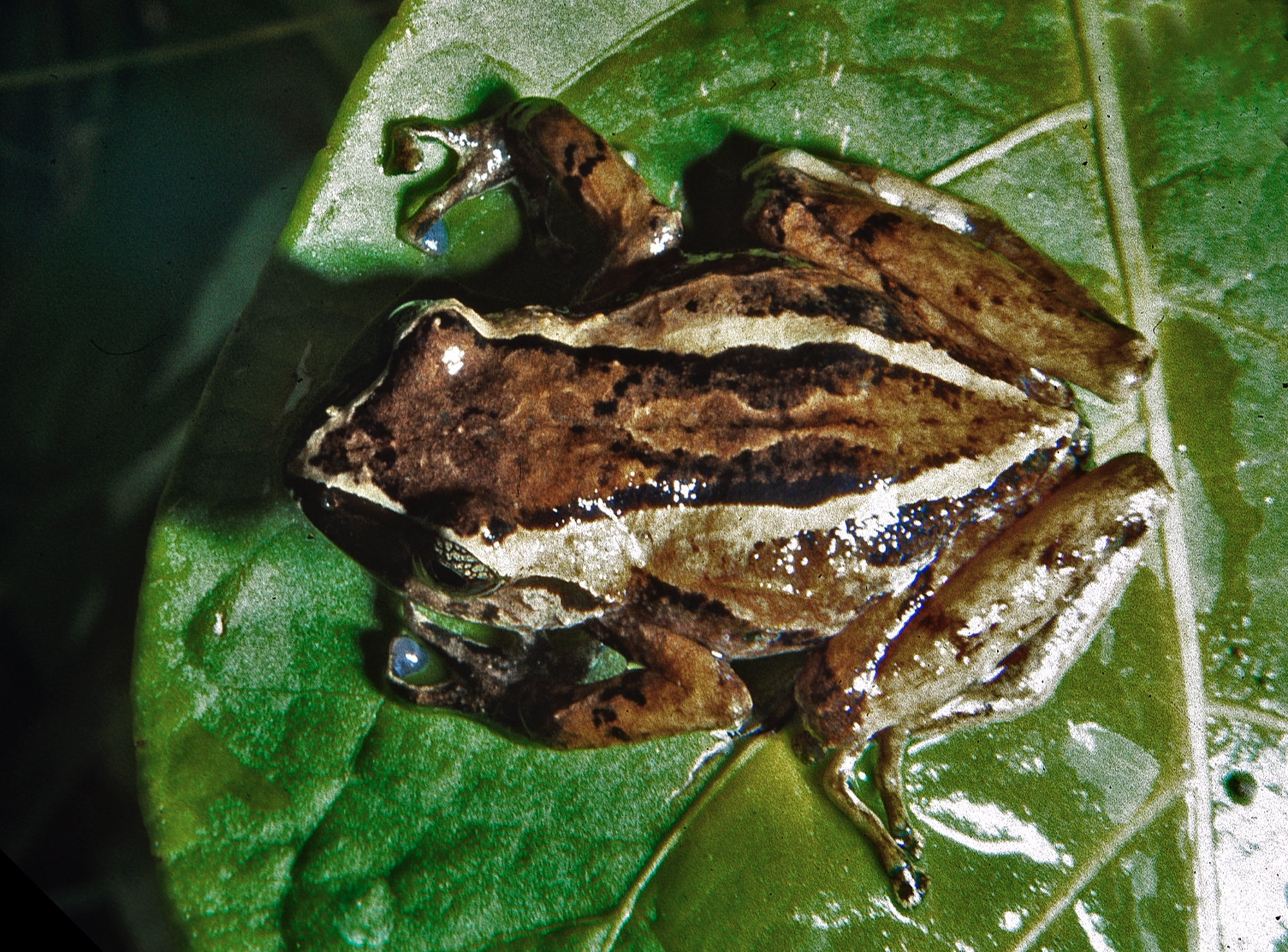

Conservation status
- Endangered (IUCN 3.1)

Scientific classification
- Kingdom: Animalia
- Phylum: Chordata
- Class: Amphibia
- Order: Anura
- Family: Strabomantidae
- Genus: Pristimantis
- Species: P. rhodoplichus

Binomial name
- Pristimantis rhodoplichus (Duellman and Wild, 1993)

Synonyms
- Eleutherodactylus rhodoplichus Duellman and Wild, 1993

= Pristimantis rhodoplichus =

Species of frog

Pristimantis rhodoplichus, also known as the Canchaque robber frog, is a species of frog in the family Strabomantidae. It is found in the Andes of southern Ecuador (Zamora-Chinchipe Province) and northern Peru (Department of Piura). The specific name rhodoplichus, from the Greek rhodon (=rose or red) and plichas (meaning inside of the thigh), refers to the rose-red color of the hidden surfaces of its thighs.

== Description ==
Adult males measure 22–29 mm (0.9–1.1 in) and adult females 30–34 mm (1.2–1.3 in) in snout–vent length. The snout is subacuminate in dorsal view and rounded in lateral view. The tympanum is distinct. The fingers have lateral keels and elliptical terminal pads. The toes have lateral fringes and terminal pads that are slightly smaller than those on the fingers. Dorsal skin is coarsely shagreened with scattered low, round to subconical tubercles. Dorsal coloration varies from reddish tan to dark brown, possibly with pale dorsolateral stripes. The inguinal region and the hidden surfaces of the thighs are rose-red. The venter varies from dull white to beige to bronze to brown. Males have a large subgular vocal sac.

== Habitat and conservation ==
Pristimantis rhodoplichus inhabits dense, humid montane and cloud forest at elevations of 2,770–3,100 m (9,090–10,170 ft) above sea level. Individuals have been found at night on low vegetation, and under ground cover by day. It breeds by direct development (i.e., there is no free-living larval stage). It is not known if it can survive in degraded areas. It is threatened by habitat loss (deforestation) caused by agriculture (mostly livestock farming) and selective wood extraction. It is known to occur in the Podocarpus National Park and Tapichala Biological Reserve, both in Ecuador.
