= Gastrotheca pseustes =

Conservation status
- Near Threatened (IUCN 3.1)

Scientific classification
- Kingdom: Animalia
- Phylum: Chordata
- Class: Amphibia
- Order: Anura
- Family: Hemiphractidae
- Genus: Gastrotheca
- Species: G. pseustes

Binomial name
- Gastrotheca pseustes Duellman, 1987

Synonyms
- Gastrotheca pseustes Duellman, 1987; Gastrotheca (Duellmania) pseustes Duellman, 2015

Species of frog

Gastrotheca pseustes is a species of frog in the family Hemiphractidae. It is endemic to Ecuador.

== Description ==
The adult male frog measures 38.3–54.4 mm in snout-vent length and the adult female frog 36.0–62.4 mm. Individual frogs can vary considerably in coloration. For most, the skin of the dorsum is green in color with brown or darker green marks. They can also be gray or brown with dark brown or bronze marks. They can be green with black or brown marks. They can be brown with green marks. They can be all brown or all yellow-green. The flanks can be gray or bronze in color with some blue-green color or blue-gray color. The axilla and inguinal areas can have bright blue marks. The belly is white, cream-white, gray, or other colors. It can have gray or black marks. The iris of the eye is gold or bronze in color with black reticulations.

== Etymology ==
Scientists gave this frog the Latin name puestes for "lying" or "liar" because of its resemblance to G. riobambe, for which it had long been considered conspecific.

== Habitat ==
This frog is found in primary cloud forests and paramo but also secondary forest, and pastureland. Scientists have seen the frog between 2,200 and 4,708 m (7,218 and 15,446 ft) above sea level.

Scientists have reported this frog in some protected places: Reserva Ecológica Antisana, Parque Nacional Cotopaxi, Parque Nacional Llanganates, Reserva de Producción Faunística Chimborazo, Parque Nacional Sangay, and Parque Nacional Cajas.

== Reproduction ==
The female frog carries her eggs in a pouch on her back. She brings the tadpoles to small bodies of water. Females have been reported with 49-197 eggs at a time. The eggs are about 4.5 mm in diameter.

== Threats ==
The IUCN classifies this frog as near threatened. Its principal threat may be habitat loss, including the introduction of pine trees from other parts of the world, but it has shown some resilience to this. Water pollution from agrochemical runoff may interfere with reproduction. Scientists have also reported chytridiomycosis in this species.
