= Pristimantis balionotus =

Conservation status
- Endangered (IUCN 3.1)

Scientific classification
- Kingdom: Animalia
- Phylum: Chordata
- Class: Amphibia
- Order: Anura
- Family: Strabomantidae
- Genus: Pristimantis
- Subgenus: Pristimantis
- Species: P. balionotus

Binomial name
- Pristimantis balionotus (Lynch, 1979)

Synonyms
- Eleutherodactylus balionotus Lynch, 1979

Species of frog

Pristimantis balionotus is a species of frog in the family Strabomantidae. It is endemic to Ecuador and only known from its type locality on the border between the Loja and Zamora-Chinchipe Provinces, near the crest of the Ecuadorian Andes. Common name crest robber frog has been coined for it.

== Description ==
Adult males measure 21.8–22.2 mm (0.86–0.87 in) (based on two males only) and females 27.1–29.1 mm (1.07–1.15 in) in snout–vent length. The snout is subacuminate in dorsal and rounded in lateral profile. The tympanum is visible. The fingers and toes bear discs and lateral fringes but no webbing. Skin is dorsally tuberculate and ventrally areolate. The dorsum is dark brown with some flecks. The ventrum is dirty white and may have black flecks.

Pristimantis balionotus is similar to Pristimantis riveti and might be its geographic variant.

== Habitat and conservation ==
Its natural habitat is sub-páramo bushland at 2,800 m (9,200 ft) above sea level. Specimens have been found in terrestrial bromeliads during the daytime. It is moderately common but threatened by habitat loss and degradation caused by agricultural activities and pine plantations. It occurs in the Podocarpus National Park.
