= Gastrotheca psychrophila =

Conservation status
- Endangered (IUCN 3.1)

Scientific classification
- Kingdom: Animalia
- Phylum: Chordata
- Class: Amphibia
- Order: Anura
- Family: Hemiphractidae
- Genus: Gastrotheca
- Species: G. psychrophila

Binomial name
- Gastrotheca psychrophila Duellman, 1974

Synonyms
- Gastrotheca psychrophila Duellman, 1974; Gastrotheca (Duellmania) psychrophila Dubois, 1987 "1986"; Gastrotheca (Gastrotheca) psychrophila Duellman, 2015

Species of frog

Gastrotheca psychrophila, commonly called the cold marsupial frog or ridge marsupial frog, is a species of frog in the family Hemiphractidae. It is endemic to Ecuador, specifically the Loja-Zamora ridge of the Cordillera del Cóndor range.

== Description ==
The adult male frog measures 45.8–49.9 mm in snout-vent length and the adult female 45.8–49.9 mm. The skin of the dorsum is dark green or bright green in color with cream-white stains. The flanks are bronze in color closer to the anterior and blue toward the posterior. Some individuals have black marks in the inguinal area. The legs are brown or green in color. The ventrum is gray-pink or brown in color. The iris of the eye is bronze in color with black reticulations.

== Etymology ==
Scientists gave this frog the Greek scientific name psychrophilia. Psychros means "cold" and philos means "has an affinity for," referring to the frog's chilly mountain habitat.

== Habitat ==
This frog lives in forests and sub-paramo where the cold wind comes from the east. There are dense grasses and bromeliad plants on the ground. People see the frogs near the bromeliads and under rocks. Scientists have seen the frog between 2,150 and 2,850 m (7,050 and 9,350 ft) above sea level.

Scientists have reported this frog a protected place: Parque Nacional Podocarpus.

== Reproduction ==
The female frog carries her eggs in a pouch on her back. She later carries the tadpoles to water, where they grow to considerable size, as big as 88.9 mm long including the tail.

== Threats ==
The IUCN classifies this species as endangered. The principal threat is habitat loss by conversion of forest to pine tree plantations and cities.
