= Pristimantis ocreatus =

Conservation status
- Endangered (IUCN 3.1)

Scientific classification
- Kingdom: Animalia
- Phylum: Chordata
- Class: Amphibia
- Order: Anura
- Family: Strabomantidae
- Genus: Pristimantis
- Species: P. ocreatus

Binomial name
- Pristimantis ocreatus (Lynch, 1981)

Synonyms
- Eleutherodactylus ocreatus Lynch, 1981

Species of frog

Pristimantis ocreatus is a species of frog in the family Craugastoridae. Although often reported as being endemic to the Andes of northern Ecuador, it has also been reported from extreme southern Colombia (Colombian Massif in Nariño Department); the possibility of range extension to Colombia has been acknowledged. Its type locality is the west slope of volcano Chiles in the Carchi Province, and common name Carchi robber frog has been coined for it. These frogs have pale hands and feet, as if wearing gloves and socks—hence the specific name ocreatus, which is Latin and means "wearing leggings" or "booted".

== Description ==
Pristimantis ocreatus is a small species: based on four males and two females, males measure 12–17 mm (0.47–0.67 in) and females 20 mm (0.79 in) in snout–vent length. Dorsum and upper flanks are dark brown. Some individuals have a reddish-brown mid-dorsal stripe or broad dorsal band. Most individuals have pale orange spots along dorsolateral folds. Flanks and venter are black with white spots. Hands and feet are white (except for outer edges). Iris is blue-gray. Skin of dorsum bears low ridges and finely areolate, subconical warts on the flanks.

== Habitat and conservation ==
Natural habitats of Pristimantis ocreatus are sub-páramo and páramo habitats, but it can also occur in secondary forest. It occurs at elevations of 3,000–4,150 m (9,840–13,620 ft) above sea level. It is a fossorial species. The type series was collected under rocks and clumps of dirt by day. In Páramos del Angel it shares its habitat with the larger Pristimantis curtipes and Pristimantis thymelensis.

This species is threatened by habitat loss caused by agriculture and wood extraction. Burning in 2002–2003 may have extirpated this species from Páramos del Angel.
