= Atelopus planispina =

Conservation status
- Critically Endangered (IUCN 3.1)

Scientific classification
- Kingdom: Animalia
- Phylum: Chordata
- Class: Amphibia
- Order: Anura
- Family: Bufonidae
- Genus: Atelopus
- Species: A. planispina

Binomial name
- Atelopus planispina Jiménez de la Espada, 1875

Synonyms
- Atelopus planispinus — Rivero, 1963 (unjustified emendation)

Species of amphibian

Atelopus planispina is a species of toad in the family Bufonidae. It is endemic to the eastern slopes of the Andes of Ecuador. According to the IUCN SSC Amphibian Specialist Group, it is restricted to the Napo Province, although other sources suggest somewhat wider range. It has not been seen since 1985 and might already be extinct. Common names Planispina's harlequin frog, Napo stubfoot toad, and flat-spined atelopus have been coined for it.

== Description ==
Adult males measure about 31–32 mm (1.2–1.3 in) and adult females about 32 mm (1.3 in) in snout–vent length. The snout has rounded, protruding tip. The head and the body are dorsally flattened. The tympanum is absent. The body is covered by tiny spinules. The forelimbs are elongate and slender. The hind limbs are slender. The toes are webbed. The upper parts are pale green to orange with large black spots. The flanks are light green and the ventral parts are pale orange.

== Habitat and conservation ==
Atelopus planispina inhabit humid montane forests at elevations of 1,000–2,000 m (3,300–6,600 ft) above sea level. Breeding probably takes place in streams.

This species was last recorded in 1985 or in 1988, despite later searches. If the species still persists, the remaining population is likely to be very small. The past population decline was probably caused by chytridiomycosis. Current major threat are habitat loss caused by agriculture, logging, mining, and infrastructure development, as well as agricultural pollution. Its range overlaps with a number of protected areas.
