= Pristimantis vidua =

Conservation status
- Endangered (IUCN 3.1)

Scientific classification
- Kingdom: Animalia
- Phylum: Chordata
- Class: Amphibia
- Order: Anura
- Clade: Brachycephaloidea
- Family: Craugastoridae
- Genus: Pristimantis
- Species: P. vidua

Binomial name
- Pristimantis vidua (Lynch, 1979)

Synonyms
- Eleutherodactylus vidua Lynch, 1979

Species of frog

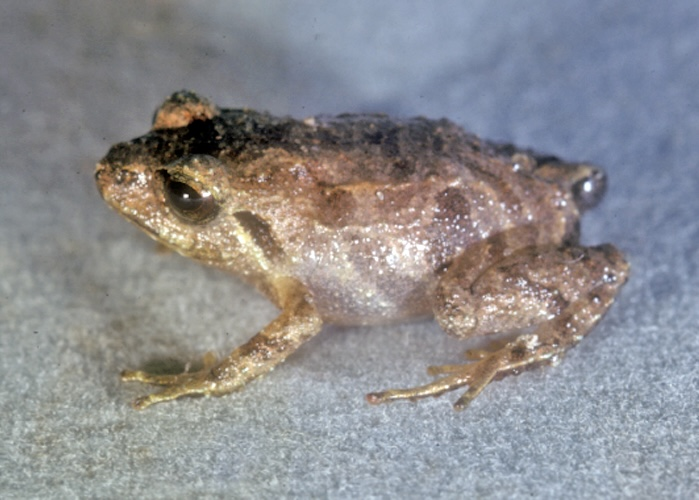
Adult pristimantis vidua

Pristimantis vidua is a species of frog in the family Strabomantidae. It is endemic to Ecuador. Its natural habitats are tropical high-altitude shrubland and high-altitude grassland. It is threatened by habitat loss.
