= Atelopus halihelos =

Conservation status
- Critically Endangered (IUCN 3.1)

Scientific classification
- Kingdom: Animalia
- Phylum: Chordata
- Class: Amphibia
- Order: Anura
- Family: Bufonidae
- Genus: Atelopus
- Species: A. halihelos

Binomial name
- Atelopus halihelos Peters, 1973

Species of amphibian

Atelopus halihelos, the Morona-Santiago stubfoot toad, is a species of toad in the family Bufonidae endemic to Ecuador. Its natural habitats are subtropical or tropical moist montane forests and rivers. It is threatened by habitat loss. It is also threatened by the amphibian chytridiomycosis panzootic, which is a great factor to biodiversity loss. The IUCN estimates that there's only 0-49 individuals left in the wild.

An individual named Sad Santiago was one of the last remaining of the species. An expedition, led by Jaime Culebras, aimed to breed him with a female he found in the cloud forest of the Ecuadorian Andes.

While they did not successfully produce any eggs, another expedition was sent and found 1 male and 1 female which successfully produced offspring, raising hope this species can be saved.
