= Pristimantis pastazensis =

Conservation status
- Endangered (IUCN 3.1)

Scientific classification
- Kingdom: Animalia
- Phylum: Chordata
- Class: Amphibia
- Order: Anura
- Clade: Brachycephaloidea
- Family: Craugastoridae
- Genus: Pristimantis
- Species: P. pastazensis

Binomial name
- Pristimantis pastazensis (Andersson, 1945)

Synonyms
- Eleutherodactylus pastazensis Andersson, 1945

Species of frog

Pristimantis pastazensis is a species of frog in the family Strabomantidae. It is endemic to Ecuador. Its natural habitats are tropical moist montane forests and heavily degraded former forest. It is threatened by habitat loss.
