= Pristimantis rubicundus =

Conservation status
- Near Threatened (IUCN 3.1)

Scientific classification
- Kingdom: Animalia
- Phylum: Chordata
- Class: Amphibia
- Order: Anura
- Clade: Brachycephaloidea
- Family: Craugastoridae
- Genus: Pristimantis
- Species: P. rubicundus

Binomial name
- Pristimantis rubicundus (Jiménez de la Espada, 1875)

Synonyms
- Hylodes rubicundus Jiménez de la Espada, 1875; Eleutherodactylus rubicundus (Jiménez de la Espada, 1875)

Species of frog

Pristimantis rubicundus is a species of frog in the family Strabomantidae. It is endemic to Ecuador. Its natural habitat is tropical moist montane forest. It is threatened by habitat loss.
