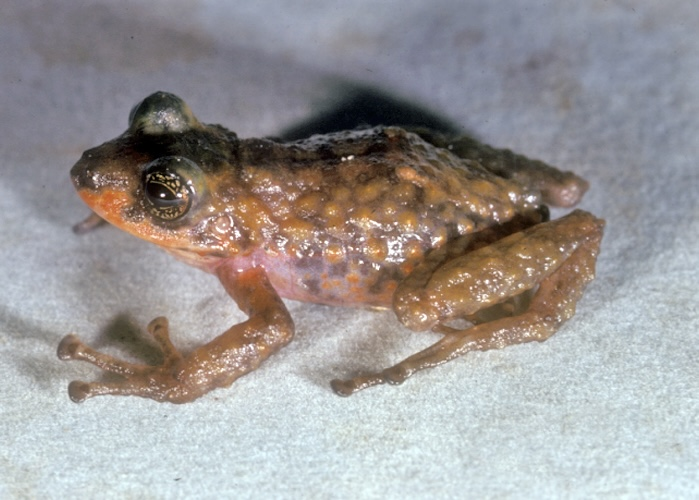

Conservation status
- Endangered (IUCN 3.1)

Scientific classification
- Kingdom: Animalia
- Phylum: Chordata
- Class: Amphibia
- Order: Anura
- Clade: Brachycephaloidea
- Family: Craugastoridae
- Genus: Pristimantis
- Species: P. percultus

Binomial name
- Pristimantis percultus (Lynch, 1979)

Synonyms
- Eleutherodactylus percultus Lynch, 1979

= Pristimantis percultus =

Species of frog

Pristimantis percultus is a species of frog in the family Strabomantidae. It is endemic to Ecuador. Its natural habitat is tropical high-altitude shrubland. It is threatened by habitat loss.
