= Pristimantis incanus =

Conservation status
- Endangered (IUCN 3.1)

Scientific classification
- Kingdom: Animalia
- Phylum: Chordata
- Class: Amphibia
- Order: Anura
- Clade: Brachycephaloidea
- Family: Craugastoridae
- Genus: Pristimantis
- Species: P. incanus

Binomial name
- Pristimantis incanus (Lynch & Duellman, 1980)

Synonyms
- Eleutherodactylus incanus Lynch & Duellman, 1980

Species of frog

Pristimantis incanus is a species of frog in the family Strabomantidae. It is endemic to Ecuador. Its natural habitats are tropical moist montane forests and rivers. It is threatened by habitat loss.
