= Pristimantis gladiator =

Conservation status
- Vulnerable (IUCN 3.1)

Scientific classification
- Kingdom: Animalia
- Phylum: Chordata
- Class: Amphibia
- Order: Anura
- Clade: Brachycephaloidea
- Family: Craugastoridae
- Genus: Pristimantis
- Species: P. gladiator

Binomial name
- Pristimantis gladiator (Lynch, 1976)

Synonyms
- Eleutherodactylus gladiator Lynch, 1976

Species of frog

Pristimantis gladiator (common name: Papallacta Valley robber frog) is a species of frog in the family Strabomantidae. It is found on the Amazonian slopes of the Andes in Ecuador (Napo Province, Imbabura Province) and southern Colombia (Putumayo Department). Its elevational range is 2,270–2,910 m (7,450–9,550 ft) asl.

== Description ==
Pristimantis gladiator has a brown to orange-brown dorsum with dark brown markings, and a black groin with orange to red spots. Adult males measure 15–17 mm (0.59–0.67 in) in snout–vent length; adult females are unknown.

== Habitat and conservation ==
Its natural habitats are páramo grassland, cloud forest, and clearings. They are hiding by day under rocks and logs. It is threatened by habitat loss.
