= Pristimantis glandulosus =

Conservation status
- Endangered (IUCN 3.1)

Scientific classification
- Kingdom: Animalia
- Phylum: Chordata
- Class: Amphibia
- Order: Anura
- Family: Strabomantidae
- Genus: Pristimantis
- Species: P. glandulosus

Binomial name
- Pristimantis glandulosus (Boulenger, 1880)

Synonyms
- Eleutherodactylus glandulosus (Boulenger, 1880)

Species of frog

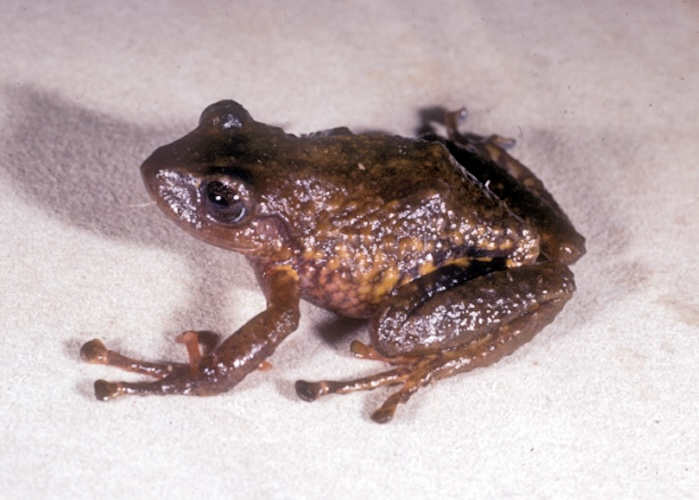
Pristimantis glandulosus

Pristimantis glandulosus is a species of frog in the family Strabomantidae. It is endemic to Ecuador. Its natural habitats are tropical moist montane forests and high-altitude grassland. It is threatened by habitat loss.
