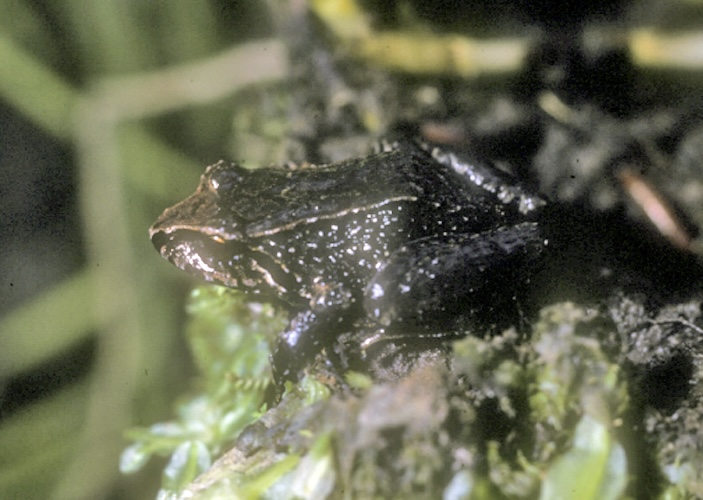

Conservation status
- Endangered (IUCN 3.1)

Scientific classification
- Kingdom: Animalia
- Phylum: Chordata
- Class: Amphibia
- Order: Anura
- Family: Strabomantidae
- Genus: Pristimantis
- Species: P. festae

Binomial name
- Pristimantis festae (Peracca, 1904)

Synonyms
- Paludicola festae Peracca, 1904; Eleutherodactylus trepidotus Lynch, 1968; Pristimantis trepidotus (Lynch, 1968)

= Pristimantis festae =

Species of frog

Pristimantis trepidotus is a species of frog in the family Strabomantidae. It is endemic to Ecuador. Its natural habitats are tropical moist montane forest, high-altitude shrubland, and high-altitude grassland. It is threatened by habitat loss.
