= Andinosaura petrorum =

Conservation status
- Endangered (IUCN 3.1)

Scientific classification
- Kingdom: Animalia
- Phylum: Chordata
- Class: Reptilia
- Order: Squamata
- Family: Gymnophthalmidae
- Genus: Andinosaura
- Species: A. petrorum

Binomial name
- Andinosaura petrorum (Kizirian, 1996)

Synonyms
- Proctoporus petrorum Kizirian, 1996; Riama petrorum (Kizirian, 1996)

Species of lizard

Andinosaura petrorum is a species of lizard in the family Gymnophthalmidae. The species is endemic to Ecuador.

== Etymology ==
The specific name, petrorum (masculine genitive plural), is in honor of three men named Peters or Peter: German zoologist Wilhelm Peters, American herpetologist James A. Peters, and American herpetologist Peter D. Spoecker.

== Habitat ==
The natural habitat of Andinosaura petrorum is forest, at elevations around 2,263 m (7,425 ft).

== Behavior ==
Andinosaura petrorum is terrestrial.

== Reproduction ==
Andinosaura petrorum is oviparous.
