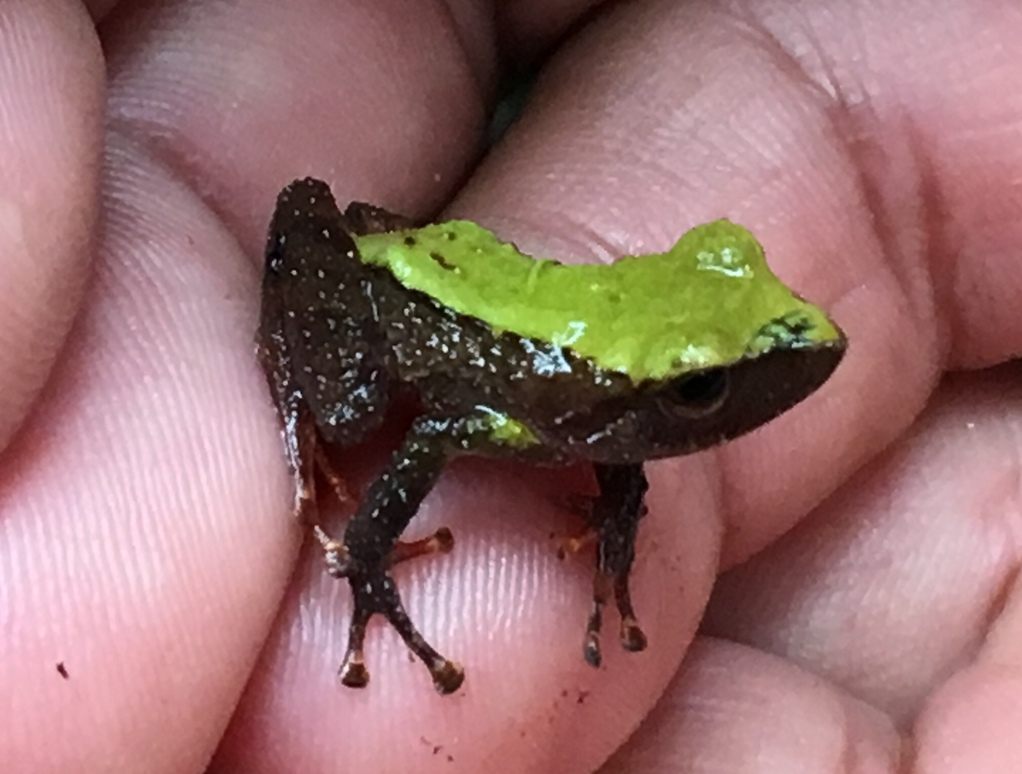

Conservation status
- Endangered (IUCN 3.1)

Scientific classification
- Kingdom: Animalia
- Phylum: Chordata
- Class: Amphibia
- Order: Anura
- Family: Strabomantidae
- Genus: Pristimantis
- Subgenus: Pristimantis
- Species: P. acerus

Binomial name
- Pristimantis acerus (Lynch and Duellman, 1980)

Synonyms
- Eleutherodactylus acerus Lynch and Duellman, 1980

= Pristimantis acerus =

Species of amphibian

Pristimantis acerus is a species of frog in the family Strabomantidae. It is endemic to Ecuador and is known from its type locality between Papallacta and Cuyujúathe in the Napo Province, and from the Llanganates National Park in Pastaza Province. This species is rated as Endangered by the IUCN. The common name Papallacta robber frog has been coined for it.

== Etymology ==
The specific name acerus is Greek and refers to the absence of tubercles on the eyelid, heel, and tarsus.

== Description ==
Three males in the type series measure 25–34 mm (0.98–1.34 in), and the only female measures 45 mm (1.8 in) in snout–vent length. The snout is subacuminate in dorsal view and pointed or protruding in lateral profile. The canthus rostralis is relatively sharp. The tympanum is distinct. Both fingers and toes bear broad discs; the fingers have ill-defined lateral fringes, and the toes have indistinct lateral keels. The dorsum is black or dark grey; dorsal skin is smooth. The venter is dark grey to dark greyish brown. Males have creamy brown throats.

== Habitat ==
Pristimantis acerus is known from the cloud forests of the Andes at elevations between 2,660–2,750 m (8,730–9,020 ft) asl. A specimen was found under a log at daytime, while the others were found at night on bushes 0–2 m (0.0–6.6 ft) above the ground. A likely threat to this species is deforestation caused by agriculture, logging, and human settlements.
