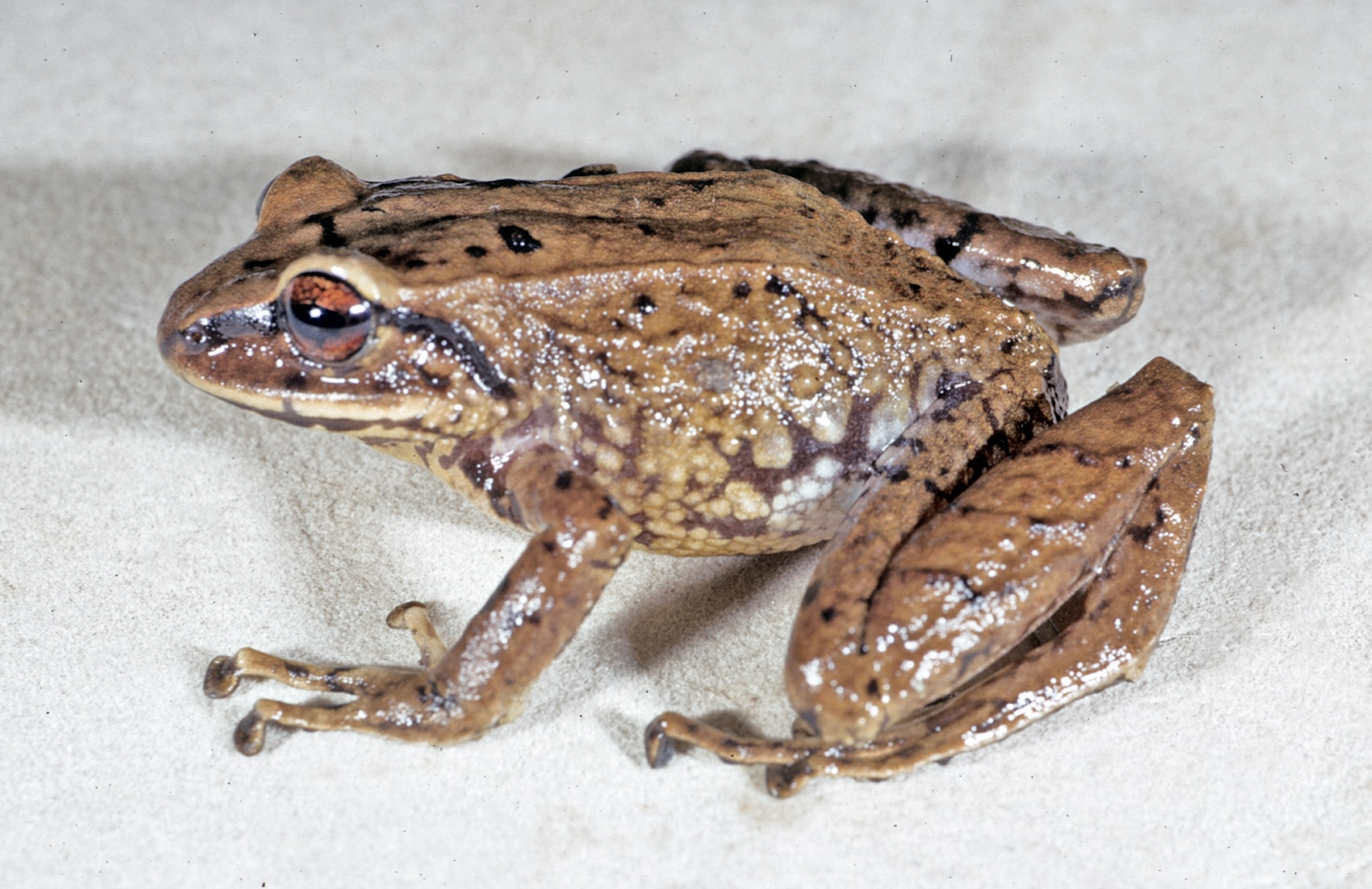
- Pristimantis devillei side-profile

Conservation status
- Endangered (IUCN 3.1)

Scientific classification
- Kingdom: Animalia
- Phylum: Chordata
- Class: Amphibia
- Order: Anura
- Family: Strabomantidae
- Genus: Pristimantis
- Species: P. devillei

Binomial name
- Pristimantis devillei (Boulenger, 1880)

Synonyms
- Eleutherodactylus devillei (Boulenger, 1880)

= Pristimantis devillei =

Species of frog

Pristimantis devillei is a species of frog in the family Strabomantidae. It is endemic to Ecuador. Its natural habitats are tropical moist montane forests, high-altitude shrubland, and tundra. It is threatened by habitat loss.

== Description ==
Pristimantis devillei are small to medium-sized frogs. The average snout–vent length for males is 26.8 mm (1.06 in) and 39.0 mm (1.54 in) for females. Snout is rounded and has prominent continuous dorsolateral folds. Skin is smooth and dorsal. It has prominent tympanums, measuring 1/3–1/2 the size of its eye. Dorsal coloration can vary between orange, light brown, dark brown, gray, and almost black.
