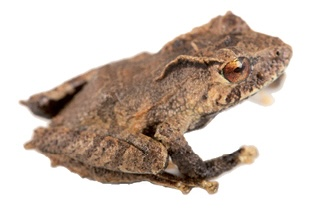
- Pristimantis cryptomelas

Conservation status
- Near Threatened (IUCN 3.1)

Scientific classification
- Kingdom: Animalia
- Phylum: Chordata
- Class: Amphibia
- Order: Anura
- Clade: Brachycephaloidea
- Family: Craugastoridae
- Genus: Pristimantis
- Species: P. cryptomelas

Binomial name
- Pristimantis cryptomelas (Lynch, 1979)

Synonyms
- Eleutherodactylus cryptomelas Lynch, 1979

= Pristimantis cryptomelas =

Species of frog

Pristimantis cryptomelas is a species of frog in the family Strabomantidae. It is found in the provinces of Morona-Santiago, Zamora-Chinchipe and Loja in Ecuador and the province of Huancabamba in the Piura region in Peru.

Its natural habitats are tropical moist montane forests and high-altitude grassland. It is threatened by habitat loss.
