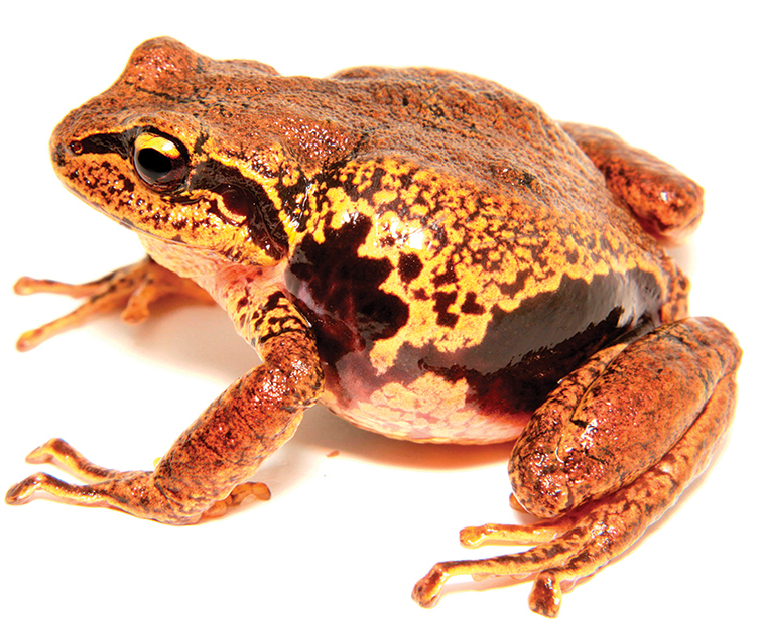

Conservation status
- Endangered (IUCN 3.1)

Scientific classification
- Kingdom: Animalia
- Phylum: Chordata
- Class: Amphibia
- Order: Anura
- Family: Strabomantidae
- Genus: Pristimantis
- Species: P. pycnodermis

Binomial name
- Pristimantis pycnodermis (Lynch, 1979)

Synonyms
- Eleutherodactylus pycnodermis Lynch, 1979

= Pristimantis pycnodermis =

Species of frog

Pristimantis pycnodermis, also known as thickskin robber frog, is a species of frog in the family Strabomantidae. It is endemic to the Ecuadorean Andes and occurs in the Cordillera de Matanga in the Azuay and Morona-Santiago Provinces. The specific name pycnodermis is Greek and means "thick skin", a characteristic of this species.

== Description ==
Adult males measure 18–32 mm (0.7–1.3 in) and adult females 33–44 mm (1.3–1.7 in) in snout–vent length. The snout is subacuminate in dorsal view and truncate in lateral profile. The tympanum is prominent. Both the fingers and the toes have lateral fringes and broadened tips with discs. Skin of the dorsum is thick and glandular. Preserved specimens are brown with large black blotches on the flanks and the limbs. The venter is dull cream or yellowish cream and is frequently spotted with brown. Males have a sub-gular vocal sac.

== Habitat and conservation ==
Pristimantis pycnodermis primarily inhabits paramos but it can also occur in meadows and pastures in upper cloud forests. Specimens have been found under rocks and logs. The altitudinal range is 2,652–3,436 m (8,701–11,273 ft) above sea level. Development is probably direct, without free-living tadpole stage.

Pristimantis pycnodermis is a common species but its range is fragmented. It is threatened by habitat loss and deterioration caused by agriculture (crops, livestock) and human settlements. It occurs in the Sangay National Park.
