= Atelopus bomolochos =

Conservation status
- Critically Endangered (IUCN 3.1)

Scientific classification
- Kingdom: Animalia
- Phylum: Chordata
- Class: Amphibia
- Order: Anura
- Family: Bufonidae
- Genus: Atelopus
- Species: A. bomolochos

Binomial name
- Atelopus bomolochos Peters, 1973

Species of amphibian

Atelopus bomolochos, the Azuay stubfoot toad or Cuenca jambato frog, is a species of toad in the family Bufonidae. It is endemic to southern Ecuador and known from Cordillera Oriental in the Azuay, Cañar, and Loja Provinces.

== Description ==
Males measure 38.4–40.8 mm (1.51–1.61 in) and females 43.9–51.0 mm (1.73–2.01 in) in snout–vent length. The dorsum is yellow, yellow with brown, or yellowish green, usually with black spots on the back. The belly is yellow or orange.

== Habitat and conservation ==
Its natural habitats are humid montane forest, sub-páramo, and páramo at elevations of 2,500–2,800 m (8,200–9,200 ft) above sea level. It breeds in streams.

This formerly abundant species has nearly disappeared from its range. The decline is attributed to chytridiomycosis and habitat loss. After one last individual was observed in 2002 in the Sangay National Park, and the species was feared extinct, the species was not seen before a small population was rediscovered in 2015 near Cuenca.

A captive population is maintained in the Amaru Zoo, Cuenca.
