= Pristimantis atratus =

Conservation status
- Vulnerable (IUCN 3.1)

Scientific classification
- Kingdom: Animalia
- Phylum: Chordata
- Class: Amphibia
- Order: Anura
- Clade: Brachycephaloidea
- Family: Craugastoridae
- Genus: Pristimantis
- Species: P. atratus

Binomial name
- Pristimantis atratus (Lynch, 1979)

Synonyms
- Eleutherodactylus atratus Lynch, 1979

Species of frog

Pristimantis atratus or black-thighed rainfrog is a species of frog in the family Strabomantidae. It is endemic to Ecuador. Its natural habitats are tropical moist montane forest, high-altitude shrubland, and high-altitude grassland. It is threatened by habitat loss.
