= Gastrotheca orophylax =

Conservation status
- Vulnerable (IUCN 3.1)

Scientific classification
- Kingdom: Animalia
- Phylum: Chordata
- Class: Amphibia
- Order: Anura
- Family: Hemiphractidae
- Genus: Gastrotheca
- Species: G. orophylax

Binomial name
- Gastrotheca orophylax Duellman & Pyles, 1980

Synonyms
- Gastrotheca orophylax Duellman and Pyles, 1980; Gastrotheca (Opisthodelphys) orophylax Dubois, 1987 "1986"; Gastrotheca (Duellmania) orophylax Duellman, 2015

Species of frog

The guardian marsupial frog or Papallacta marsupial frog (Gastrotheca orophylax) is a species of frog in the family Hemiphractidae. It is found in Colombia and Ecuador.

== Description ==
The adult male frog measures 59 mm in snout-vent length and the adult female frog 74 mm. The skin of the dorsum, flanks, and legs is green in color. There is some blue-green on the hind legs. The skin of the ventrum is cream-gray in color. The tympanum is bronze and there is a supratympanic stripe, also bronze.

== Habitat ==
This arboreal frog is found in primary and secondary cloud forest. It has also been found on potato farms. Scientists have seen the frog between 2,484 and 3,308 m (8,150 and 10,853 ft) above sea level.

Scientists have reported this frog in one protected place, Reserva Natural Privada Castelví. Another, Reserva Ecológica Cayambe-Coca, overlaps its range.

== Reproduction ==
The female frog carries her eggs in a pouch on her back. Each has about 28 eggs per clutch. The eggs are 5 mm in diameter. The young inclubate for 88 days. Then the female uses her hind legs to push the young out of the pouch. This frog breeds through direct development and emerges as a small froglet with no free-swimming tadpole stage.

== Threats ==
The IUCN classifies this species as vulnerable to extinction. Scientists note significant habitat loss associated with agriculture, urbanization, and logging, but the frog has also disappeared from Ecuadorean habitats that have not been touched. Scientists believe climate change may be responsible for these population declines.
