= Gastrotheca espeletia =

Conservation status
- Endangered (IUCN 3.1)

Scientific classification
- Kingdom: Animalia
- Phylum: Chordata
- Class: Amphibia
- Order: Anura
- Family: Hemiphractidae
- Genus: Gastrotheca
- Species: G. espeletia

Binomial name
- Gastrotheca espeletia Duellman & Hillis, 1987

Species of amphibian

Gastrotheca espeletia, also known as the north shore marsupial frog, Espeletia marsupial frog, rana marsupial de La Cocha , or rana marsupial de Espeletia (Gastrotheca espeletia) is a species of frog in the family Hemiphractidae. It is found in Colombia and Ecuador.

== Description ==
The adult male frog measures 47.0–52.6 mm in snout-vent length and the adult female frog 44.3–51.9 mm. Different frog populations vary in color. The skin of the dorsum cna be dark brown with lighter brown marks or green with brown or darker green marks. There is light green color where the four legs meet the body. The flanks have some blue-green color or they are green with some yellow color. The belly is yellow or green in color with some gray marks. The iris of the eye is brown in color.

== Habitat ==
This frog is found in forests and paramo. People see this frog on plants. Scientists have seen the frog between 2,530 and 3,400 m (8,300 and 11,150 ft) above sea level.

Scientists have reported this frog in exactly one protected place: Reserva Ecologica El Angel.

== Reproduction ==
The female frog carries her eggs in a pouch on her back. She brings the tadpoles to still water.

== Threats ==
The IUCN classifies this frog as endangered. Threats include deforestation in favor of logging, human habitation, cattle and trout farms, and agriculture, such as potato farms.

== Sources ==
- Bolívar, W.; Coloma, L.A.; Ron, S. (2004). "Gastrotheca espeletia". IUCN Red List of Threatened Species. 2004 e.T55332A11294531. doi:10.2305/IUCN.UK.2004.RLTS.T55332A11294531.en.
