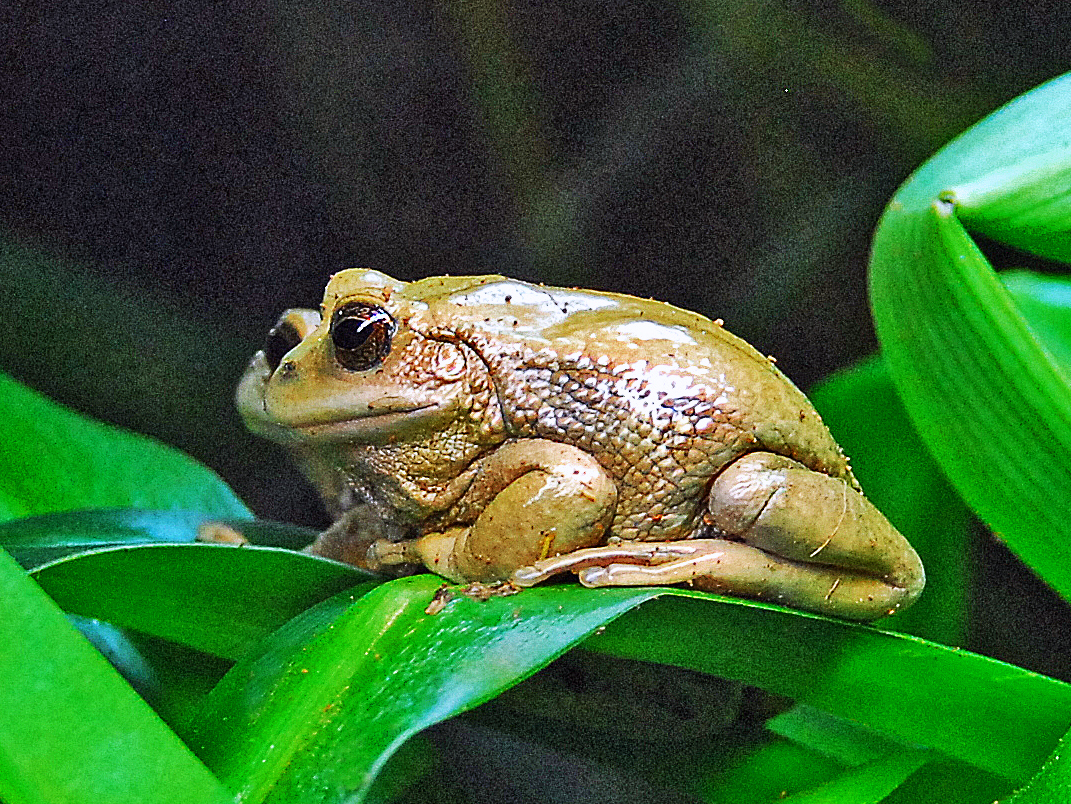

Conservation status
- Vulnerable (IUCN 3.1)

Scientific classification
- Kingdom: Animalia
- Phylum: Chordata
- Class: Amphibia
- Order: Anura
- Family: Hemiphractidae
- Genus: Gastrotheca
- Species: G. riobambae

Binomial name
- Gastrotheca riobambae (Fowler, 1913)

Synonyms
- Hyla riobambae Fowler, 1913; Hyla quitoe Fowler, 1913; Chorophilus olivaceus Andersson, 1945; Gastrotheca marsupiata ecuatoriensis Vellard, 1957; Gastrotheca riobambae Duellman and Fritts, 1972; Gastrotheca cavia Duellman, 1974; Gastrotheca (Duellmania) cavia Dubois, 1987 "1986"; Gastrotheca (Duellmania) riobambae Dubois, 1987 "1986"

= Andean marsupial tree frog =

Species of amphibian

The Andean marsupial tree frog (Gastrotheca riobambae), also known as the Riobamba marsupial frog or Riobamba pouched frog, is a species of frog in the family Hemiphractidae. It is endemic to Ecuador.

== Description ==
The adult male frog is about 34.1 – 56.8 mm long from nose to rear end and the adult female frog is about 48.6 – 66.4 mm. It has a broad, depressed body. Skin is smooth above but granulated below.

== Habitat ==
This frog lives on vegetation in forests on mountains. It can live in a variety of habitats: forest, meadow, cornfields, city parks, and in dry, rocky hillsides. Scientists have seen the frog between 1,578 and 3,449 m (5,177 and 11,316 ft) above sea level.

Scientists have reported the frog in protected places: Reserva Ecológica Los Ilinizas, Reserva Ecológica Cotacachi-Cayapas, Parque Nacional Cotopaxi, Refugio de Vida Silvestre Pasochoa, and Reserva de Producción Faunística Chimborazo.

== Young ==
Within this genus, the males transfer the eggs from the female's cloaca to their dorsal pouch, where they remain until they reach the tadpole stage. The eggs remain in the pouch for approximately five to six weeks. While in the pouch, each tadpole develops a structure called "bell gills," which scientists believe may facilitate at least gas and water exchange from mother to offspring, possibly nutrients as well. Upon emergence, the tadpole is 18 - 20 mm long, including the tail. Then, the bell gills are reabsorbed. The tadpole takes 41 days to one year to become a frog.

== Relationship to humans ==
Gastrotheca riobambae are sometimes kept as pets. Scientists also use them in experiments, especially studies of its rare reproductive system.

== Threats ==
The IUCN classifies this frog as vulnerable to extinction. The chief threat is the longstanding habitat loss in favor of urbanization, agriculture, and silviculture, specifically pine and eucalyptus trees. Pollution and climate change also pose a threat. Scientists have also detected the dangerous fungus Batrachocytrium dendrobatidis on frogs and tadpoles.
