= Podocarpus National Park =

Region of southeastern Ecuador intersecting the Andes and Amazon

- IUCN category II (national park)
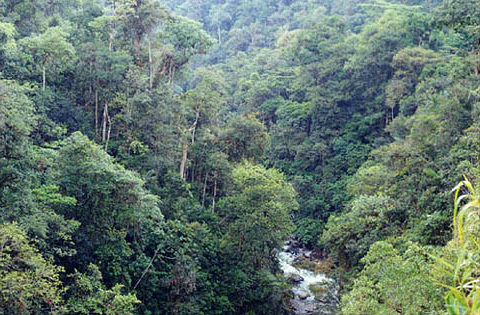
- Trees surrounding the Bombuscaro river

- Location within Ecuador
- Location: Ecuador; Zamora Chinchipe and Loja
- Nearest city: Loja, Loja, Ecuador
- Coordinates: 4°17′0″S 79°0′0″W
- Area: 1,462.8 km^{2} (564.8 sq mi)
- Established: 15 December 1982

Podocarpus National Park (Spanish: Parque Nacional Podocarpus) is a national park located in the provinces of Zamora Chinchipe and Loja, in the south-east of Ecuador. It was created in 1982.

It covers 1,462.8 square kilometres (564.8 sq mi), from two spurs of the eastern range of the Andes to the basins of the Nangaritza, Numbala, and Loyola rivers. About 85 per cent of the park is in the province of Zamora Chinchipe, and the remainder is in the province of Loja. It is categorized as a megadiverse zone and an area with a high level of endemic species because it is a meeting point between four ecological systems: Northern Andes, Southern Andes, Amazonian, and Pacific. Although considerable knowledge has been gathered about its biodiversity in parts of the area, only a minority of the species inhabiting the park has been discovered so far.

The Podocarpus National Park spans from lower montane rain forests at about 1,000 metres (3,300 ft) elevation, up to high elevation elfin forests at 3,000 metres (9,800 ft). Paramo or subparamo vegetation is found at elevations above 3,000 m (9,800 ft) where a complex of more than 100 lagoons exists, among the best-known being the Lagunas del Compadre.

The park has two main entrances. One is in the Cajanuma Sector, about 8 kilometres (5.0 mi) south of Loja, where elfin forest and paramo habitats at elevations between some 2,900 and 3,500 metres (9,500 and 11,500 ft) can be accessed. The other is in the Bombuscaro Sector, corresponding to the Bombuscaro River, in lower montane forest habitats at elevations from roughly 1,000 metres (3,300 ft) upwards. There are two alternative entrances without park guards. The Romerillos Sector, corresponding to the Jamboé River southeast of the Bombuscaro Sector, is also an entrance for gold miners who work inside the park. Another entrance is at Cerro Toledo, east of the Yangana-Valladolid route in the southwestern part of the park.

== Flora ==
The park contains an exceptionally diverse flora, and has been considered the 'Botanical Garden of America'. Its high and low mountain-forest ecosystems, located in the Nudo de Sabanilla pass, and its very humid mountain and premontane forests in the basin of the Numbala River, have more than 4,000 species of plants including trees that can measure up to 40 metres (130 ft), like the romerillo (Podocarpus glomeratus) which gives its name to the park, and many other valuable species like the Cinchona – the national tree of Ecuador – and a huge variety of orchids.

Among the main species found in the region are chilca (Baccharis spp.), laurel, San Pedro cactus, Physalis peruviana (uvilla), black elder, pumamaqui (Oreopanax sp.), sappanwood, arrayán, cashoco, alder, acacia, sage, guato blanco, cedar, castor oil plant, walnut, yumbingue (Terminalia guyanensis) and canelón (Swartzia littlei).

== Fauna ==
So far, 68 species of mammals have been recorded in the park and its surroundings; four of them are on Ecuador's "Red List" as either endangered or vulnerable:

- Mountain tapir (Tapirus pinchaque)
- Spectacled bear (Tremarctos ornatus)
- Northern pudu (Pudu mephistophiles)
- Jaguar (Panthera onca)

Other notable mammals include:

- Amazonian hog-nosed skunk (Conepatus semistriatus)
- Common grey shrew opossum (Caenolestes fuliginosus)

There are 560 registered species of birds, which accounts for six per cent of all birds registered worldwide and 40 per cent of the birds registered in Ecuador. For this reason it was identified in 1995 by Wedge and Long as one of the important areas for the conservation of neotropical birds.

The area has also been identified as a diversity hotspot of insects such as geometer moths. So far, 1,266 species of this family have been recorded in the northern part of the park and adjacent montane forests, a number exceeding any other place in the world.

== Tourist information ==
The city of Loja is approximately 15 minutes from the Cajanuma entrance. There are three main trails, including the short 15 minute educational Spectacled Bear Trail (el Sendero del Oso de Anteojos), the slightly longer 45 minute Cloud Forest Trail (el Sendero del Bosque Nublado) And the 5 km Mirador trail, which provides a view of the City of Loja and surrounding countryside. There are cabins on the mirador trail which may be rented for a minimal fee with advance booking. One may also take a two-day hike to the complex of lakes known as Lagunas del Compadres, but only with advance permission and a guide. The Bombuscara entrance, located 15 minutes from the city of Zamora, boasts several small trails, including a trail to the Poderosa waterfall (Cascada Poderosa), where one can wade in the water, a steep trail to a scenic viewpoint (sendero del mirador), and a trail to a swimming hole in the Bombuscara River. An additional trail can be accessed from barrio Yamburara in the town of Vilcabamba, which leads to the El Palto waterfall. There is a fee of $2 to enter the waterfall site.

== Climate ==
The rainy season varies throughout the park. In the east the rainy season is March – July, while in the west the rainy season is October – December. The mean temperature at high elevations is 12 °C (54 °F) while in the lower parts of the park it is 18 °C (64 °F).

== See also ==
- 1982 in the environment
