= Cauca Valley montane forests =

Ecoregion in western Colombia

Cauca Valley montane forests (NT0109)
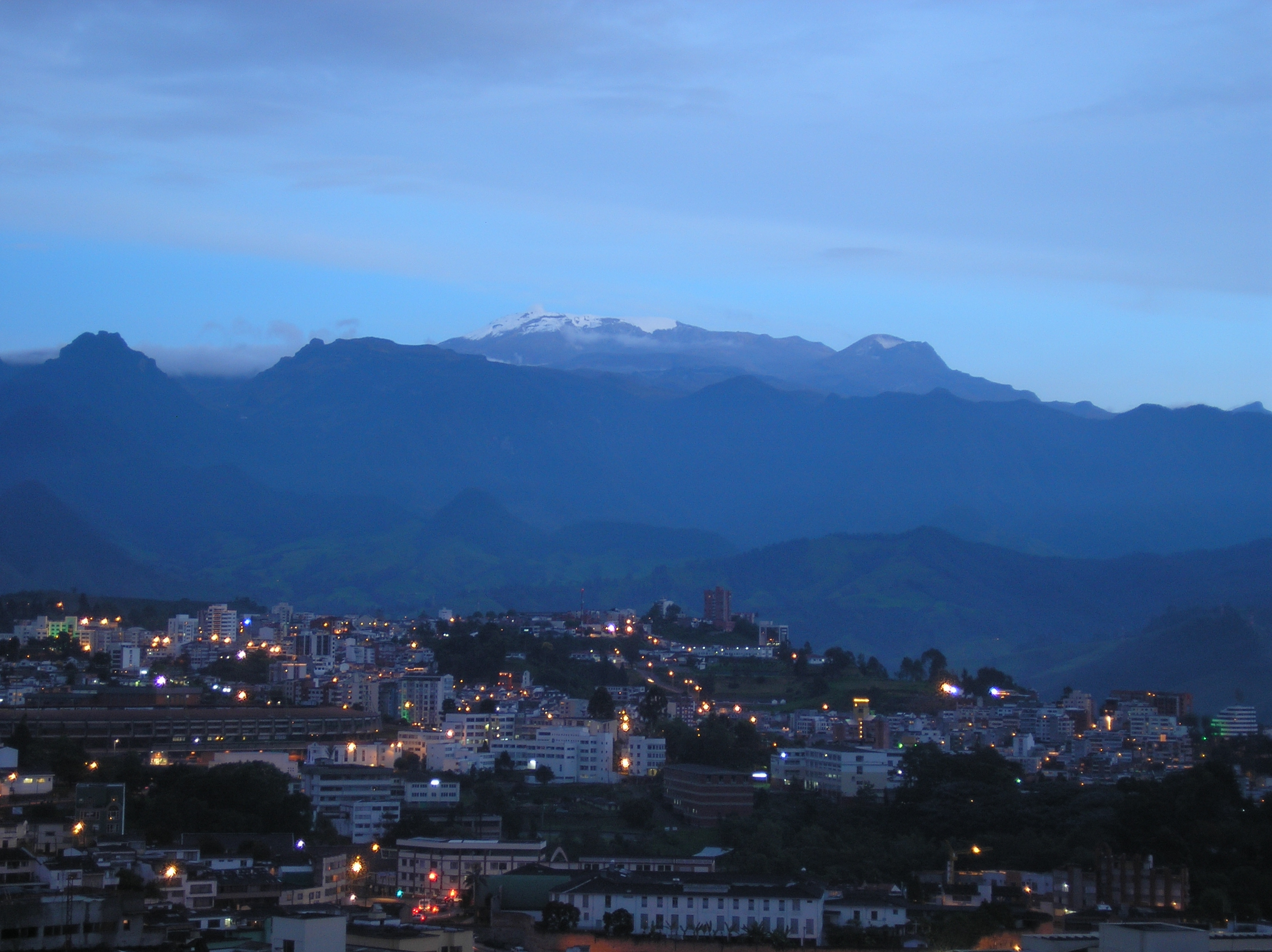
- View from Manizales of the Nevado del Ruiz in Los Nevados National Natural Park

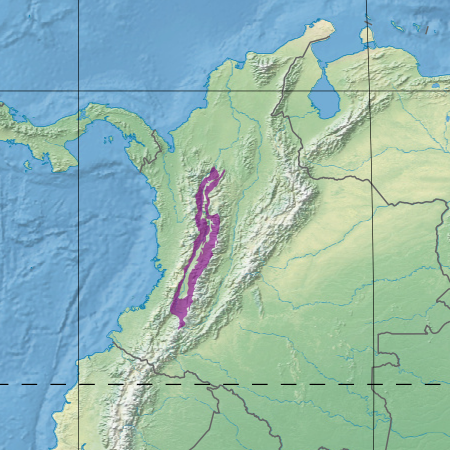
- Ecoregion territory (in purple)

Ecology
- Realm: Neotropical
- Biome: Tropical and subtropical moist broadleaf forests
- Bird species: >500
- Mammal species: 120

Geography
- Area: 32,412 km^{2} (12,514 sq mi)
- Countries: Colombia
- Coordinates: 4.839°N 75.631°W
- Climate type: Af: equatorial, fully humid

The Cauca Valley montane forests (NT0109) is an ecoregion in western Colombia. It covers the sides of the Cauca Valley, which runs from south to north between the Central and Western Ranges (cordilleras) of the Colombian Andes. The ecoregion is home to very diverse fauna and flora, due in part to its varied elevations and climates, in part to its position near the isthmus of Panama, the route along which North American species invaded South America and then diversified as they moved to the upper parts of the Andes. Little of the original habitat remains at lower levels, but higher up there are sizeable blocks of forest, some of which are protected.

== Geography ==
=== Location ===
The Cauca Valley runs from south to north between the Cordillera Central and Cordillera Occidental of the Colombian Andes. It has an area of 3,211,585 hectares (7,936,000 acres). The ecoregion covers both sides of the Cauca River valley, above the narrow strip of Cauca Valley dry forests that runs along the river. On the highest land of the cordilleras the ecoregion gives way to Northern Andean páramo. It transitions to the west into the Northwestern Andean montane forests ecoregion, and on the east into the Magdalena Valley montane forests. In the extreme north, where the river enters the Caribbean lowlands, the ecoregion transitions into the Magdalena–Urabá moist forests ecoregion.

=== Terrain ===
The Cordillera Central to the east of the Cauca Valley started to form in the late Paleozoic (541–252 Ma) on the western edge of a miogeocline, and was still low in the Cretaceous (145–66 Ma). The Cordillera Occidental to the west started to form at the end of the Mesozoic (252–66 Ma). The configuration of three Andean cordilleras in Colombia separated by two large valleys resulted from folding in the Miocene 23–5.3 million year ago (Ma). The mountains rose to the present elevations in the Pliocene (5.3–2.6 Ma) and Pleistocene (2.6 Ma to 11,700 years ago).

The Cordillera Central has volcanoes and peaks with permanent snow rising to more than 5,000 metres (16,000 ft) above sea level. It has extremely fertile volcanic soil. The Cordillera Occidental rises to 4,000 metres (13,000 ft) above sea level.. It has laterite soils with some deposits of limestone on the foothills. The Cauca Valley runs between these two ranges for about 600 kilometres (370 mi) from south to north. The foothills, starting at 1,000 metres (3,300 ft) above sea level, become increasingly steep at higher levels. They are cut by deep canyons formed by the many tributaries of the Cauca River.

=== Climate ===
At a sample location at coordinates 4.75°N 75.75°W, the Köppen climate classification is Af: equatorial, fully humid. Mean temperatures range from 19.5 °C (67.1 °F) in October to 20.3 °C (68.5 °F) in March. Total annual precipitation is about 2,300 millimetres (91 in). Monthly precipitation ranges from 116.1 millimetres (4.57 in) in July to 265 millimetres (10.4 in) in October.

== Ecology ==
The ecoregion is in the neotropical realm, in the tropical and subtropical moist broadleaf forests biome. The ecoregion is biologically diverse due in part to its varied altitudes and climates, and in part to exchange of species when the isthmus of Panama connected South and North America. It is a center of endemism for various taxa of flora and fauna. It is part of the Northern Andean Montane Forests global ecoregion, which includes the Magdalena Valley montane forests, Venezuelan Andes montane forests, Northwestern Andean montane forests, Cauca Valley montane forests, Cordillera Oriental montane forests, Santa Marta montane forests and Eastern Cordillera Real montane forests terrestrial ecoregions.

=== Flora ===
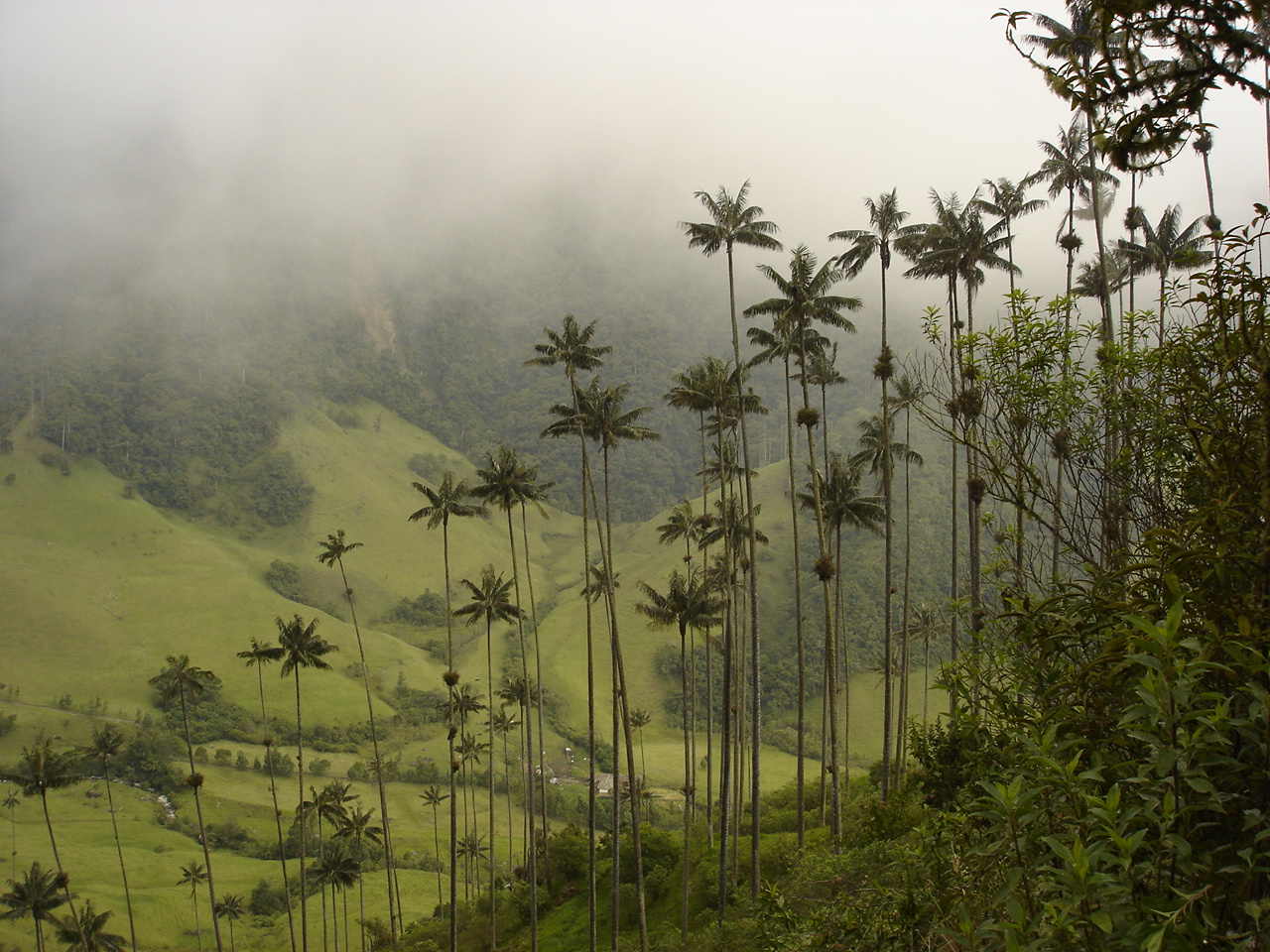
Cocora valley with Ceroxylon quindiuense palms.

The ecoregion contains diverse formations of vegetation, including dry regions in the eastern foothills of the Cordillera Occidental with annual rainfall of 500 to 1,000 millimetres (20 to 39 in) and very humid forests in the middle and upper western slopes of the Cordillera Central with annual rainfall up to 3,000 millimetres (120 in). There is high diversity between species at different levels. North American species that invaded South America when the isthmus of Panama formed have differentiated in the mid- and high-elevation forests, including Alnus, Quercus, Talauma and Juglans species. The ecoregion is a center where shrubs and epiphytes in the Gesneriaceae, Orchidaceae, Rubiaceae, and Melastomataceae families have diversified and radiated.

The montane forests extend from 1,000 to 3,000 metres (3,300 to 9,800 ft). They include palms of the genus Ceroxylon, including the Ceroxylon quindiuense. This may be the world's tallest palm, with heights that can exceed 60 metres (200 ft). Below 1,500 metres (4,900 ft) species of Fabaceae and Moraceae dominate. From 1,500 to 3,000 metres (4,900 to 9,800 ft) the majority of species are in the Lauraceae, Melastomataceae and Rubiaceae families. Above 3,000 metres (9,800 ft) the main families of flora are Ericaceae and Asteraceae.

=== Fauna ===
The Cauca Valley montane forests ecoregion is rich in species of fauna, including 200 of butterflies. Butterflies such as the subtribe Pronophilina have closely related species at different elevations and on different slopes of the mountains. There are 120 mammal species. The spectacled bear (Tremarctos ornatus) and mountain tapir (Tapirus pinchaque) are of special concern. Other endangered mammals include the black-headed spider monkey (Ateles fusciceps), Geoffroy's spider monkey (Ateles geoffroyi), Handley's slender opossum (Marmosops handleyi) and white-footed tamarin (Saguinus leucopus).

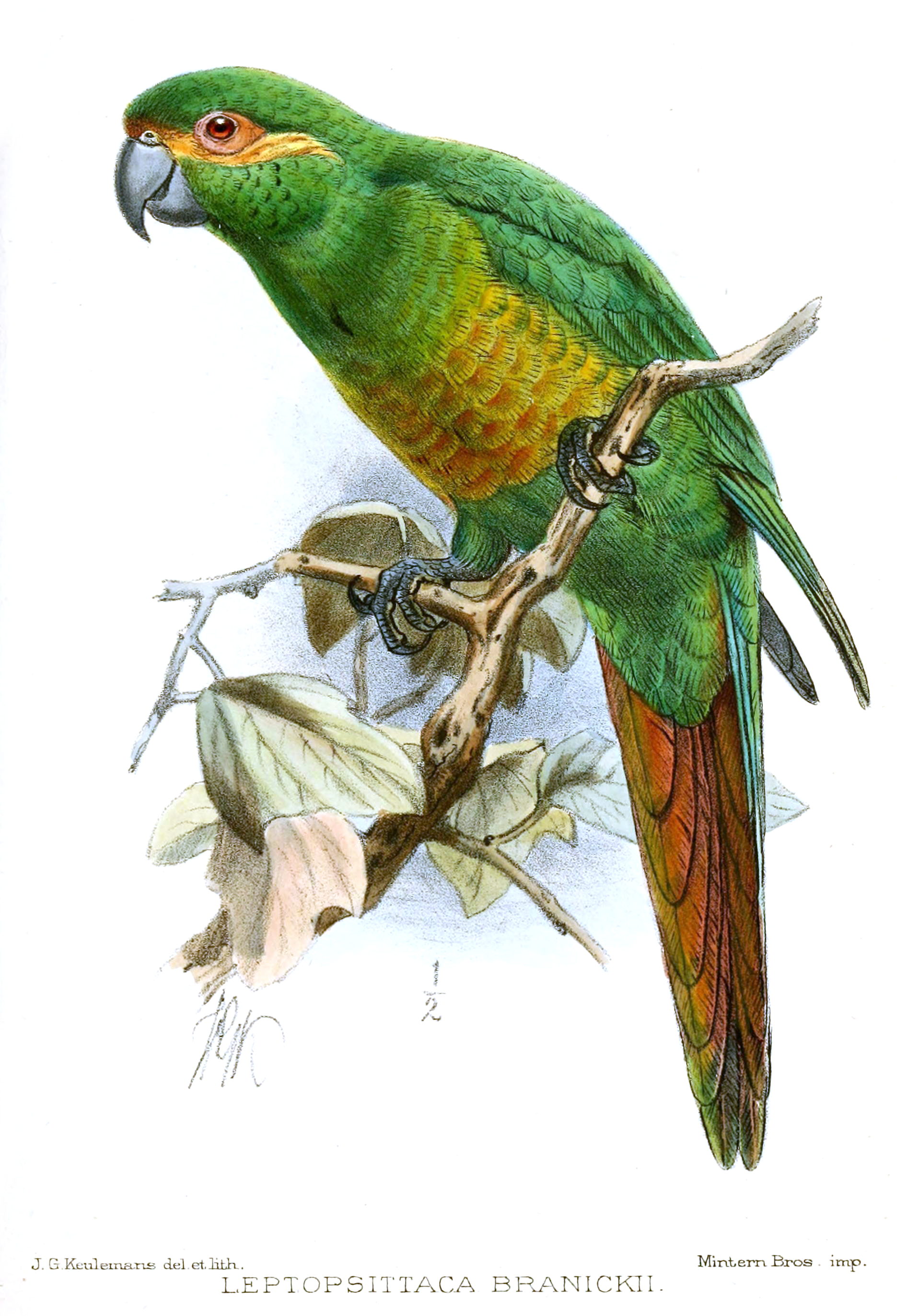
Golden-plumed parakeet (Leptosittaca branickii)

There are over 500 bird species. This ecoregion contains a 19,000 square kilometres (7,300 sq mi) Endemic Bird Area as defined by BirdLife International. There are 12 restricted-range species, of which four are found only in the region. These include the Cauca guan (Penelope perspicax), restricted to a few remnants of humid forest at elevations from 1,200 to 2,200 metres (3,900 to 7,200 ft) on both sides of the valley. Other restricted-range or endangered bird species include the brown-banded antpitta (Grallaria milleri), moustached antpitta (Grallaria alleni), multicoloured tanager (Chlorochrysa nitidissima) and golden-plumed parakeet (Leptosittaca branickii). The golden-plumed parakeet and quetzals of genus Pharomachrus migrate regionally along the Andes slopes. Endangered birds include the black-and-chestnut eagle (Spizaetus isidori), Cauca guan (Penelope perspicax), chestnut-bellied flowerpiercer (Diglossa gloriosissima), gold-ringed tanager (Bangsia aureocincta) and yellow-eared parrot (Ognorhynchus icterotis).

92 species of frogs have been recorded, of which 60 are regionally endemic. Frog species vary by elevation, and different species are found at the same elevation on different slopes. Endangered amphibians include the Angelito stubfoot toad (Atelopus angelito), Malvasa stubfoot toad (Atelopus eusebianus), painted stubfoot toad (Atelopus pictiventris), Atelopus quimbaya, Atelopus sernai, Sonson frog (Atopophrynus syntomopus), Johnson's horned treefrog (Hemiphractus johnsoni), Argelia Robber Frog (Pristimantis bernali), Serna's Robber Frog (Pristimantis dorsopictus), Rana picuda (Pristimantis lemur), Spotted robber frog (Pristimantis maculosus), Rana diminuta (Pristimantis parectatus), Los Patos robber frog (Pristimantis scoloblepharus) and Ruiz's robber frog (Strabomantis ruizi).

Endangered reptiles include the Lepidoblepharis williamsi, Daniel's large scale lizard (Ptychoglossus danieli) and Colombian lightbulb lizard (Riama columbiana).

== Status ==
The World Wide Fund for Nature (WWF) gives the region the status of "Critical/Endangered". At elevations from 1,000 to 2,000 metres (3,300 to 6,600 ft) most of the forest has been destroyed, with only isolated fragments remaining. The 519 hectares (1,280 acres) Yotoco Forest Reserve holds the largest such fragment. Higher up there are larger areas of forest. Protected areas include Farallones de Cali National Park, Tatamá National Natural Park and Los Nevados National Natural Park, and small regional reserves such as the Ucumarí Regional Park. The forests outside the national parks continue to be logged, and large birds and mammals are threatened by illegal hunting. The Cinturon Andino Cluster Biosphere Reserve covers part of the ecoregion.
