= Magdalena Valley montane forests =

Ecoregion in Colombia

Magdalena Valley montane forests (NT0136)
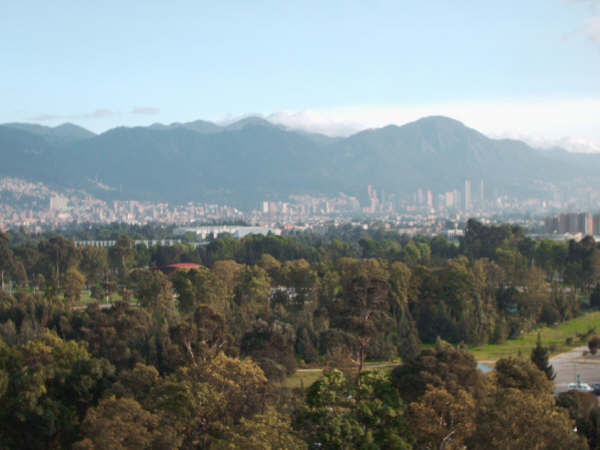
- Center of Bogotá from the Simón Bolívar park

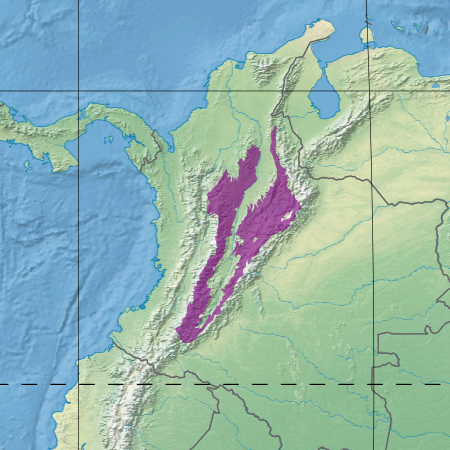
- Ecoregion territory (in purple)

Ecology
- Realm: Neotropical
- Biome: Tropical and subtropical moist broadleaf forests

Geography
- Area: 105,153 km^{2} (40,600 sq mi)
- Countries: Colombia
- Coordinates: 5.517°N 74.108°W
- Geology: Central Ranges, Eastern Cordillera Basin
- Rivers: Bogotá, Carare, Chicamocha, Sumapaz
- Climate type: Af: equatorial; fully humid Cfb: subtropical highland climate

The Magdalena Valley montane forests (NT0136) is an ecoregion in the Andes mountains of central Colombia.

== Geography ==
=== Location ===
The ecoregion covers the higher land on both sides of the valley of the Magdalena River in the Colombian Andes. The river flows north between the Eastern Ranges to the east and the Central Ranges to the west, down to the Caribbean lowlands. It has an area of about 10,515,351 hectares (25,984,000 acres).

The ecoregion encloses the Magdalena Valley dry forests ecoregion which in turn contains the upper Magdalena River, and the Magdalena–Urabá moist forests ecoregion which contains the lower Magdalena River and extends across the lowlands north of the Magdalena Valley montane forests ecoregion. Sections of Northern Andean páramo cover the highest land beside and within the ecoregion. To the west, the ecoregion merges into the Cauca Valley montane forests on the other side of the Cordillera Central, and to the east it merges into the Cordillera Oriental montane forests. In the far south the ecoregion transitions into the Eastern Cordillera Real montane forests.

=== Terrain ===
The rocks of the Eastern Ranges are sedimentary in origin, while the central range is highly volcanic and metamorphic. Soils are very diverse, giving rise to diverse flora. The 2,000 metres (6,600 ft) Serranía de San Lucas rises in the center of the Magdalena Medio. The Magdalena River drains north to the Caribbean. From south to north the main tributaries are the Suaza, Saldaña, Sumapaz, Chicamocha, Carare, Cauca and its tributary the Nechí.

=== Climate ===
At a sample location at 5.75°N 74.75°W, the Köppen climate classification is Af: equatorial; fully humid. Mean temperatures range from 25.9 °C (78.6 °F) in October to 26.6 °C (79.9 °F) in March. There are rainy seasons from April to June and from October to December. At the sample location the total yearly rainfall is about 3,000 millimetres (120 in). Monthly rainfall rises from 117.3 millimetres (4.62 in) in January to 339.3 millimetres (13.36 in) in May, falls to 167.9 millimetres (6.61 in) in July, then rises again to 391.5 millimetres (15.41 in) in October.

== Ecology ==
Wax palms in Cocora valley

The ecoregion is in the neotropical realm, in the tropical and subtropical moist broadleaf forests biome. It is part of the Northern Andean Montane Forests global ecoregion, which includes the Magdalena Valley montane forests, Venezuelan Andes montane forests, Northwestern Andean montane forests, Cauca Valley montane forests, Cordillera Oriental montane forests, Santa Marta montane forests and Eastern Cordillera Real montane forests terrestrial ecoregions.

=== Flora ===
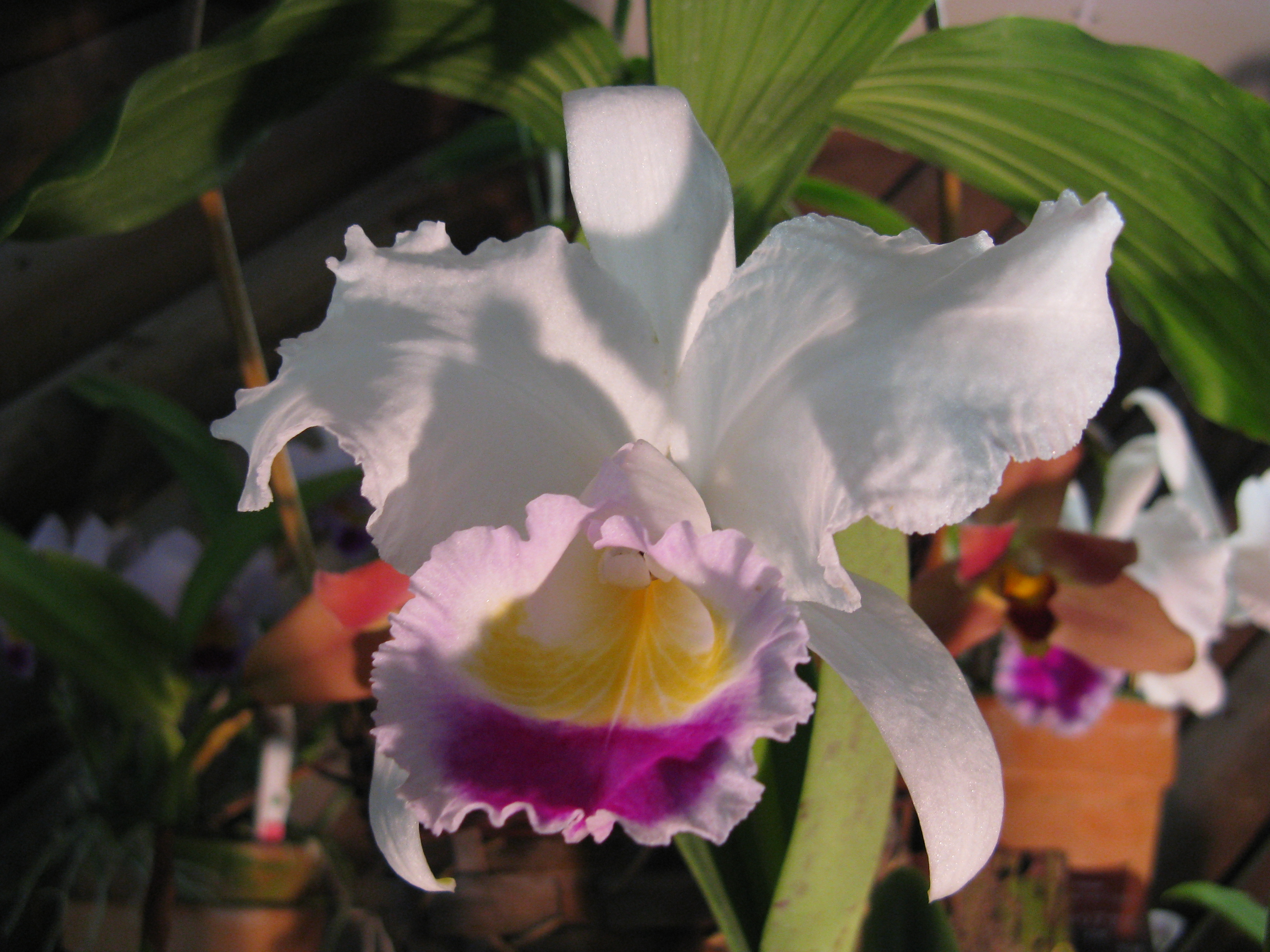
The Christmas orchid (Cattleya trianae) is endangered.

Cloud forests are found at elevation of about 1,800 to 2,200 metres (5,900 to 7,200 ft) and higher up at elevations of 2,800 to 3,200 metres (9,200 to 10,500 ft). Common trees include Anacardium excelsum, Cedrela odorata, Cordia alliodora, Decussocarpus rospigliossi, Hieronyma macrocarpa, Jacaranda caucana, Juglans neotropica, Podocarpus oleifolius, Quercus humboldtii, Tabebuia rosea, Tabebuia serratifolia, Vochysia ferruginea and palms such as Ceroxylon alpinum, Ceroxylon quindiuense, Ceroxylon parvifrons, Ceroxylon sasaimae, Ceroxylon vogelianum and Dictyocaryum lamarckianum. The wax palms (Ceroxylon) species are of special concern. The Andean rosewood (Aniba perutilis) is endangered.

Endemics found in the hilly areas along the cordilleras include Ceroxylon sasaimae, Heliconia abaloi, Heliconia estiletioides, Heliconia huilensis, Heliconia laxa, Heliconia mutisiana, Heliconia oleosa, Heliconia reptans and Odontoglossum crispum. Endemic orchids include Cattleya trianae in the upper Magdalena and Cattleya warscewiczii in the San Lucas – Nechi region. Other common orchids are Masdevallia coccinea, Miltoniopsis vexillaria, Odontoglossum crispum and Odontoglossum nobile. Colombia’s national flower, the Christmas orchid (Cattleya trianae) is endangered.

=== Fauna ===
Large vertebrates are the cougar (Puma concolor), oncilla (Leopardus tigrinus), spectacled bear (Tremarctos ornatus), Geoffroy's spider monkey (Ateles geoffroyi), brown woolly monkey (Lagothrix lagothricha), South American tapir (Tapirus terrestris), mountain tapir (Tapirus pinchaque), little red brocket (Mazama rufina), pacarana (Dinomys branickii), mountain paca (Cuniculus taczanowskii) and Venezuelan red howler (Alouatta seniculus). The brown woolly monkey, mountain tapir and spectacled bear are of special concern. Endangered mammals include black-headed spider monkey (Ateles fusciceps), red-crested tree-rat (Santamartamys rufodorsalis), Handley's slender opossum (Marmosops handleyi), white-footed tamarin (Saguinus leucopus) and mountain tapir (Tapirus pinchaque). Endangered reptiles include Daniel's large scale lizard (Ptychoglossus danieli) and Colombian lightbulb lizard (Riama columbiana).

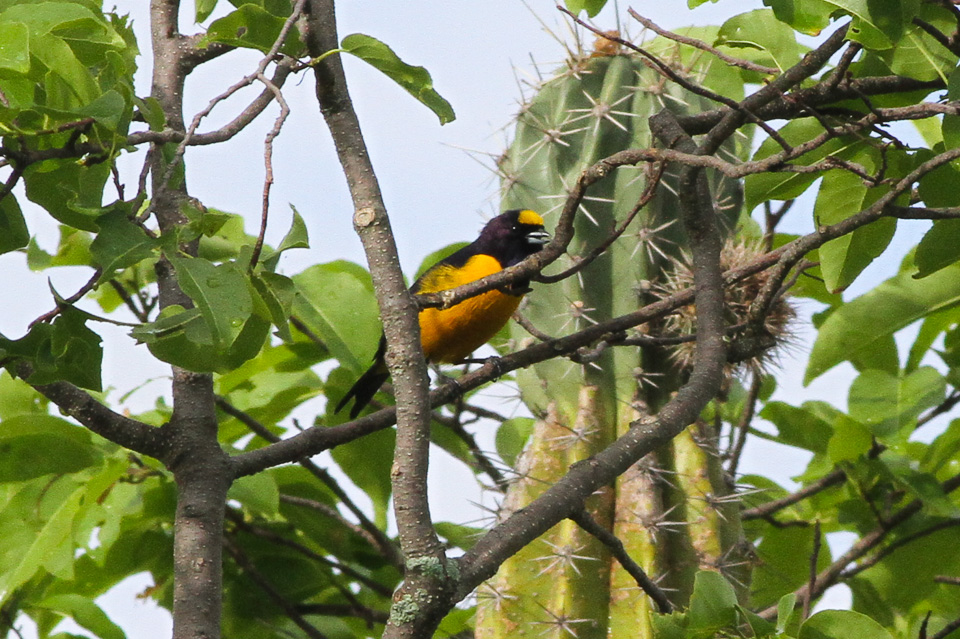
The velvet-fronted euphonia (Euphonia concinna) is endemic.

Endemic species of birds include the burrowing owl (Athene cunicularia tolimae) and velvet-fronted euphonia (Euphonia concinna), Resident birds include Andean cock-of-the-rock (Rupicola peruvianus), black-and-chestnut eagle (Spizaetus isidori), blue-billed curassow (Crax alberti), crested quetzal (Pharomachrus antisianus), golden-headed quetzal (Pharomachrus auriceps), wattled guan (Aburria aburri) and yellow-eared parrot (Ognorhynchus icterotis) The yellow-eared parrot is of special concern. Migratory song-birds and raptors include broad-winged hawk (Buteo platypterus), rose-breasted grosbeak (Pheucticus ludovicianus), summer tanager (Piranga rubra) and Swainson's hawk (Buteo swainsoni). Endangered birds include Antioquia bristle tyrant (Phylloscartes lanyoni), black-and-chestnut eagle (Spizaetus isidori), blue-billed curassow (Crax alberti), Cauca guan (Penelope perspicax), chestnut-bellied hummingbird (Amazilia castaneiventris), Fuertes's parrot (Hapalopsittaca fuertesi), gorgeted wood quail (Odontophorus strophium), Tolima dove (Leptotila conoveri) and yellow-headed brush finch (Atlapetes flaviceps).

Endangered amphibians include Santander poison frog (Andinobates virolinensis), Huila stubfoot toad (Atelopus ebenoides), Forest stubfoot toad (Atelopus farci), San Isidro stubfoot toad (Atelopus pedimarmoratus), Atelopus simulatus, Atelopus sonsonensis, Bogota stubfoot toad (Atelopus subornatus), Orphan salamander (Bolitoglossa capitana), Pandi mushroomtongue salamander)(Bolitoglossa pandi), Antioquia marsupial frog (Gastrotheca bufona), Johnson's horned treefrog (Hemiphractus johnsoni), Hyalinobatrachium esmeralda, Lynch's Colombian tree frog (Hyloscirtus lynchi), Rio Luisito tree frog (Hyloscirtus piceigularis), Ruiz's rocket frog (Hyloxalus ruizi), Boqueron robber frog (Hypodactylus latens), Niceforonia adenobrachia, El Estadero rain frog (Pristimantis actinolaimus), wine robber frog (Pristimantis bacchus), rana camuflada (Pristimantis fetosus), rana pierniamarilla (Pristimantis helvolus), Hernandez's robber frog (Pristimantis hernandezi), Pristimantis jorgevelosai, rana picuda (Pristimantis lemur), rana camuflada (Pristimantis lichenoides), spotted robber frog (Pristimantis maculosus), Pristimantis parectatus, Los Patos robber frog (Pristimantis scoloblepharus), Gambita robber frog (Pristimantis spilogaster), Pristimantis suetus, Rana de los torrentes (Pristimantis torrenticola), Pristimantis tribulosus, rana camuflada (Pristimantis veletis) and Colombian beaked toad (Rhinella nicefori).

== Status ==
The World Wide Fund for Nature (WWF) gives the region the status of "Critical/Endangered". The region is home to over 70% of the population of Colombia. The slopes are used for farms and coffee plantations on a large scale, leaving little intact habitat other than fragments of forests. Destruction of these fragments continues, although there is a movement to improve conservation. The upper Magdalena basin has several parks that preserve areas above 3,000 metres (9,800 ft) of elevation, but there is little protection of land below 2,000 metres (6,600 ft). The areas in best condition are around the Cueva de los Guácharos National Natural Park in the upper Magdalena valley, and on the slopes of the Puracé volcano, Nevado del Huila and Serranía de San Lucas. The Cinturon Andino Cluster Biosphere Reserve covers part of the ecoregion.
