= Hemiphractus fasciatus =

Conservation status
- Vulnerable (IUCN 3.1)

Scientific classification
- Kingdom: Animalia
- Phylum: Chordata
- Class: Amphibia
- Order: Anura
- Family: Hemiphractidae
- Genus: Hemiphractus
- Species: H. fasciatus

Binomial name
- Hemiphractus fasciatus Peters, 1862

Synonyms
- Cerathyla fasciata (Peters, 1862)

Species of frog

Hemiphractus fasciatus, the banded horned treefrog, is a species of frog in the family Hemiphractidae. It is found in northwestern Ecuador and possibly the Pacific slopes of the Cordillera Occidental in Colombia; although formerly listed for Panama, this involves the similar and closely related H. elioti (western Panama), H. kaylockae (far southeastern Panama) and H. panamensis (eastern Panama). It is a relatively large frog that may readily bite.

== Description ==
Males measure up to 56 mm (2.2 in) and females to 59 mm (2.3 in) in snout–vent length. They have a distinct, triangular-shaped "helmet" on the head. Colour is light brown (sometimes yellowish or greyish) dorsally, possibly with some darker markings. The thighs are often barred. The ventral surface is brown, becoming darker on the throat and chest.

== Name ==
Scientists gave this frog the Latin name fasciatus for the bands of color on its skin.

== Reproduction ==
Breeding probably occurs throughout year. The female carries eggs on her back until hatching. Development is direct, with the juveniles emerging as fully developed froglets.

== Behaviour ==
Hemiphractus fasciatus are nocturnal. When disturbed, they may emit noise. Their defensive behaviour involves throwing back the head and opening the mouth, revealing the bright yellowish orange tongue and interior of the mouth. They can readily bite.

== Habitat and conservation ==
The natural habitats of Hemiphractus fasciatus are very humid lowland, lower montane, and cloud forests.

The species is threatened by habitat loss and the fungus Batrachochytrium dendrobatidis. A captive colony that has been established at the El Valle Amphibian Conservation Center, Panama, for possible future re-release into the wild, was initially identified as this species, but following a taxonomic review in 2018 these belong to the newly described H. elioti.
