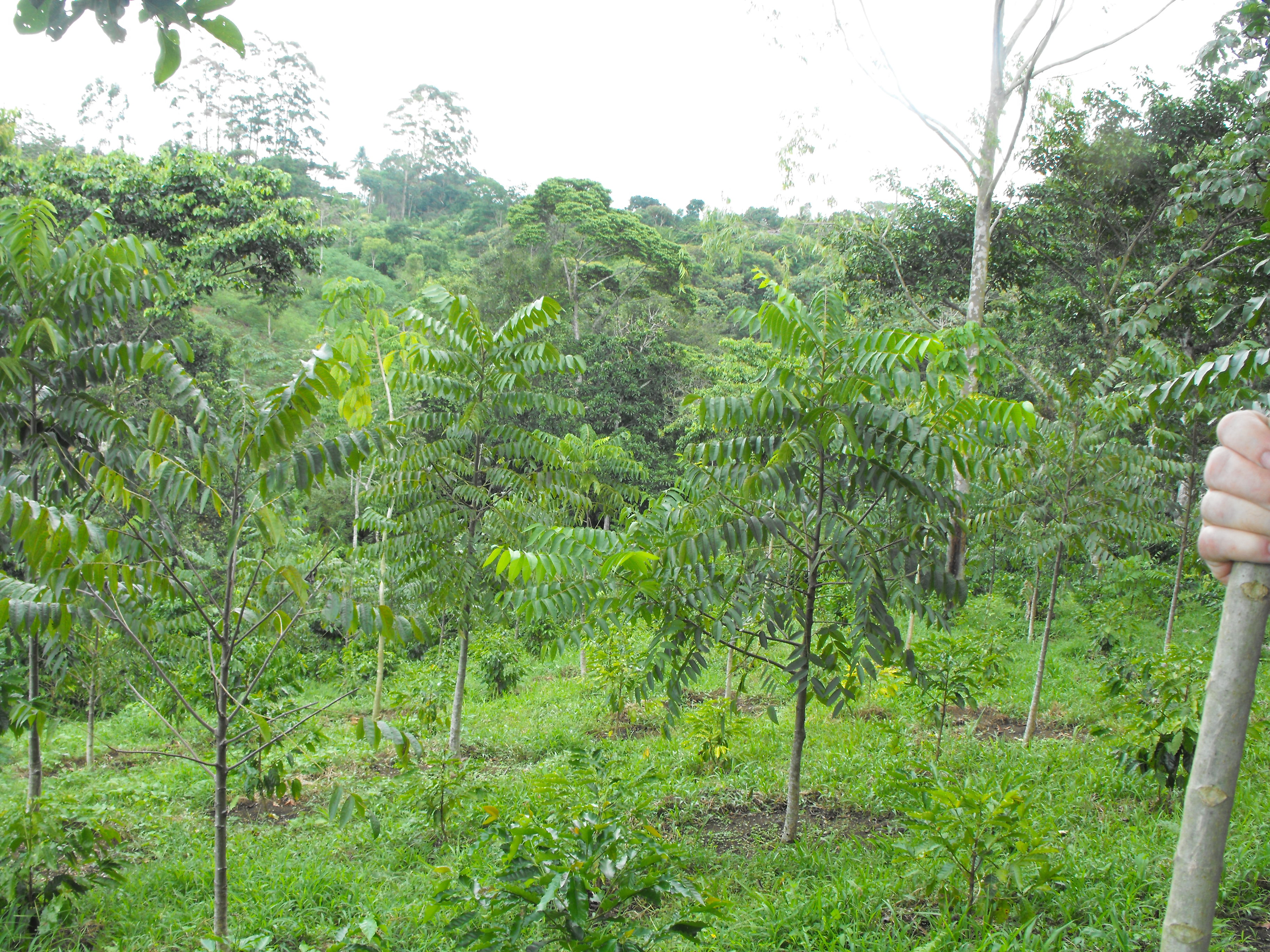

Conservation status
- Near Threatened (IUCN 3.1)

Scientific classification
- Kingdom: Plantae
- Clade: Embryophytes
- Clade: Tracheophytes
- Clade: Angiosperms
- Clade: Eudicots
- Clade: Rosids
- Order: Fagales
- Family: Juglandaceae
- Genus: Juglans
- Section: Juglans sect. Rhysocaryon
- Species: J. pyriformis

Binomial name
- Juglans pyriformis Liebm.

Synonyms
- Juglans guatemalensis W.E.Manning; Juglans olanchana Standl. & L.O.Williams; Juglans olanchana var. standleyi W.E.Manning; Wallia pyriformis (Liebm.) Alef.

= Juglans pyriformis =

Species of tree

Juglans pyriformis is a semideciduous tree species in the Juglandaceae family. It can be found in Costa Rica, Guatemala, El Salvador, Honduras, Mexico, and Nicaragua. It can grow up to 40 m in height and 1.5 m in diameter. The long branches bear twigs tipped with 40–50 cm long, glabrous, pinately compound leaves, darker on the top than on the bottom. The base of the trunk sometimes has buttresses.

== Habitat ==
Juglans pyriformis grows in wet and very wet tropical forests, most frequently on river banks, observed from 0–1400 m above sea level. Reports that it also grows in the mountainous regions of Argentina may result from confusion with the cedro negro (Spanish for "Black Cedar" due to its close appearance to West Indian cedar) or nogal (Spanish for "walnut") (J. neotropica).

== Economic importance ==
=== Timber ===
Juglans pyriformis has a cylindrical, straight shaft that is free of branches for 5–15 m. The moderately heavy (420–450 kg/m^{3}) and moderately durable heartwood has a dark coffee color, is easy to work, and takes an excellent finish. It is used for light construction, cabinetmaking, parquet floors, luxurious furniture, turnery, musical instruments, and veneer.

=== Fruit ===
The nuts are edible. The husk is used to dye leather.
