= Pristimantis factiosus =

Conservation status
- Least Concern (IUCN 3.1)

Scientific classification
- Kingdom: Animalia
- Phylum: Chordata
- Class: Amphibia
- Order: Anura
- Family: Strabomantidae
- Genus: Pristimantis
- Subgenus: Pristimantis
- Species: P. factiosus

Binomial name
- Pristimantis factiosus (Lynch and Rueda-Almonacid, 1998)

Synonyms
- Eleutherodactylus factiosus Lynch and Rueda-Almonacid, 1998

Species of frog

Pristimantis factiosus is a species of frog in the family Strabomantidae. It is endemic to the eastern slopes of the Cordillera Central in Colombia and only known from near its type locality, El Estadero in Samaná, Caldas Department, and from Anorí, Antioquia Department. The IUCN SSC Amphibian Specialist Group, however, has mapped its distribution as continuous between these locations. The specific name factiosus refers to sexual dimorphism in coloration of the flanks.

== Description ==
Adult males measure 18–22 mm (0.7–0.9 in) and adult females 29–33 mm (1.1–1.3 in) in snout–vent length. The snout is subacuminate in dorsal view and rounded in lateral profile. The tympanum rounded and prominent. The fingers bear narrow lateral keels and round terminal discs. The toes bear lateral keels and round terminal discs that are smaller than those of fingers. No webbing is present. Skin is very finely shagreened. There are ill-defined, partial dorsolateral folds at mid-body. The dorsum is pale yellowish-brown to dark brown. There is a black inter-orbital bar and spots forming a dorsal chevron; the sides of the head are also black. The venter is dirty white or gray with black stippling. Males have a large pale area edged in brown on posterior flank/groin, while the corresponding pale area in females is diffuse, without well-defined edges. The iris is dark red.

== Habitat and conservation ==
Pristimantis factiosus occurs in forest (including degraded former forest), pastureland, along roadsides, and in adjacent areas at elevations of 1,750–2,200 m (5,740–7,220 ft) above sea level. It is nocturnal and can be found on low vegetation. Development is direct (i.e, there is no free-living larval stage). It is preyed upon by the carnivorous frog Hemiphractus johnsoni.

An adaptable and common species, Pristimantis factiosus is not facing known threats and is not considered threatened.
