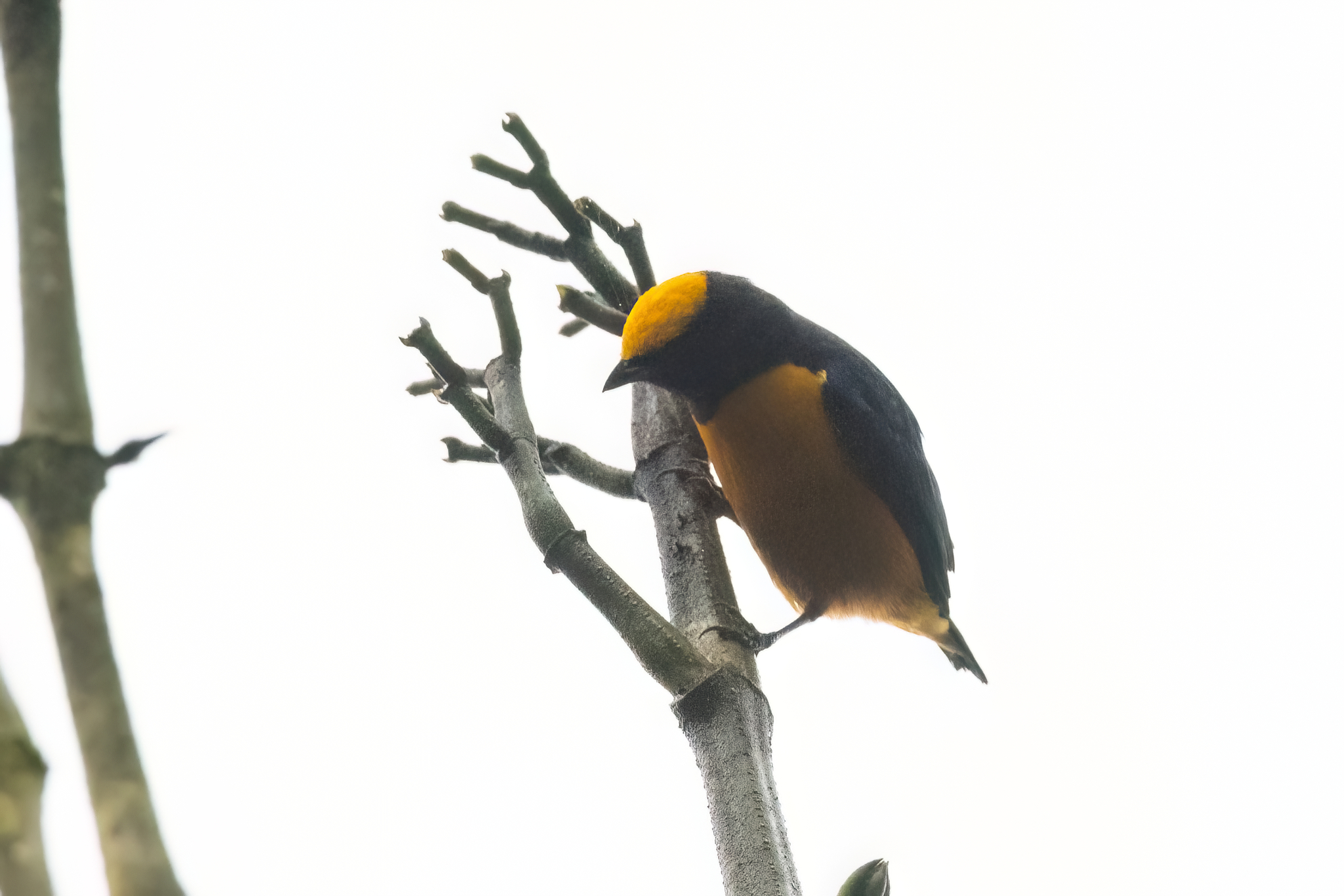

Conservation status
- Least Concern (IUCN 3.1)

Scientific classification
- Kingdom: Animalia
- Phylum: Chordata
- Class: Aves
- Order: Passeriformes
- Family: Fringillidae
- Subfamily: Euphoniinae
- Genus: Euphonia
- Species: E. saturata

Binomial name
- Euphonia saturata (Cabanis, 1861)

= Orange-crowned euphonia =

Species of bird

The orange-crowned euphonia (Euphonia saturata) is a species of bird in the family Fringillidae, the finches and euphonias. It is found in Colombia, Ecuador, and Peru.

== Taxonomy and systematics ==
The orange-crowned euphonia was originally described in 1861 with the binomial Phonasca saturata. It was eventually reassigned to genus Euphonia that had been erected in 1806. The genus Euphonia was long placed in the family Thraupidae, the "true" tanagers. Multiple studies in the late twentieth and early twenty-first centuries resulted in its being reassigned to its present place in the family Fringillidae.

Some early twentieth century authors treated the orange-crowned euphonia, Finsch's euphonia (E. finschi), and the velvet-fronted euphonia (E. concinna) as conspecific.

The orange-crowned euphonia is monotypic.

== Description ==
The orange-crowned euphonia is about 10 cm (3.9 in) long. The species is sexually dimorphic. Adult males have a deep orange-yellow crown. The rest of their head and their nape, throat, wings, and upperparts are glossy blue-black with a purplish tinge. The top side of their tail is blue-black and the underside dark gray. Their underparts from their breast to the undertail coverts are deep orange ochraceous. Adult females have a dark olive head and upperparts. Their underparts are olive-yellow that is slightly paler and yellower on the throat, belly, and undertail coverts. Their sides, flanks, and undertail coverts have an olive tinge. Both sexes have a dark brown iris, a blackish bill with a pale gray base to the mandible, and dark gray legs and feet.

== Distribution and habitat ==
The orange-crowned euphonia is found on both sides of Colombia's Western Andes from Chocó and Risaralda departments and south through Ecuador on the western Andean slope very slightly into extreme northwestern Peru's Tumbes Department. However, it is found only locally on the eastern slope in Colombia. It inhabits a variety of semi-open landscapes in the lowlands and foothills including deciduous woodlands, the edges of denser forest, open areas and clearings with scattered trees, parks, and gallery forest. It ranges in elevation between 300 and 1,500 m (1,000 and 4,900 ft) in Colombia, from near sea level to 1,400 m (4,600 ft) in Ecuador, and up to 800 m (2,600 ft) in Peru.

== Behavior ==
=== Movement ===
The orange-crowned euphonia is generally a resident species but limited evidence suggests that there is some seasonal or post-breeding dispersal.

=== Feeding ===
The orange-crowned euphonia's diet is not known in detail but appears to be primarily small berries and fruits. It typically forages singly or in pairs in the treetops. At least in Colombia it has been observed as part of mixed-species feeding flocks.

=== Breeding ===
The orange-crowned euphonia's breeding season has not been defined but includes April in Colombia. One nest was built by the female; it was a globe with a side entrance made from grass, rootlets, bamboo leaves, and moss. It was placed in a clump of epiphytes close to a tree trunk at a foothill elevation. Nothing else is known about the species' breeding biology.

=== Vocalization ===
The orange-crowned euphonia's song is "a leisurely series of tsit notes, nasal tcheeur notes, and fast tididit phrases". Its calls are "a simple beem-beem" and "a high, clear whistled pee-deet".

== Status ==
The IUCN has assessed the orange-crowned euphonia as being of Least Concern. Its population size is not known but is believed to be stable. No immediate threats have been identified. In Colombia it is considered uncommon on the western Andean slope and local on the eastern. It is rare in Peru. "The species’ range includes a variety of habitats, some intact, some heavily intervened, in both Colombia and Ecuador; its utilization of wooded borders and semi-open areas should provide a buffer and a measure of protection against short-term risk."
