= Riama yumborum =

Scientific classification
- Kingdom: Animalia
- Phylum: Chordata
- Class: Reptilia
- Order: Squamata
- Family: Gymnophthalmidae
- Genus: Riama
- Species: R. yumborum

Binomial name
- Riama yumborum Aguirre-Peñafiel, Torres-Carvajal, Sales-Nunes, Peck, & Maddock, 2014

Species of lizard

Riama yumborum is a species of lizard in the family Gymnophthalmidae. It is endemic to Ecuador.
