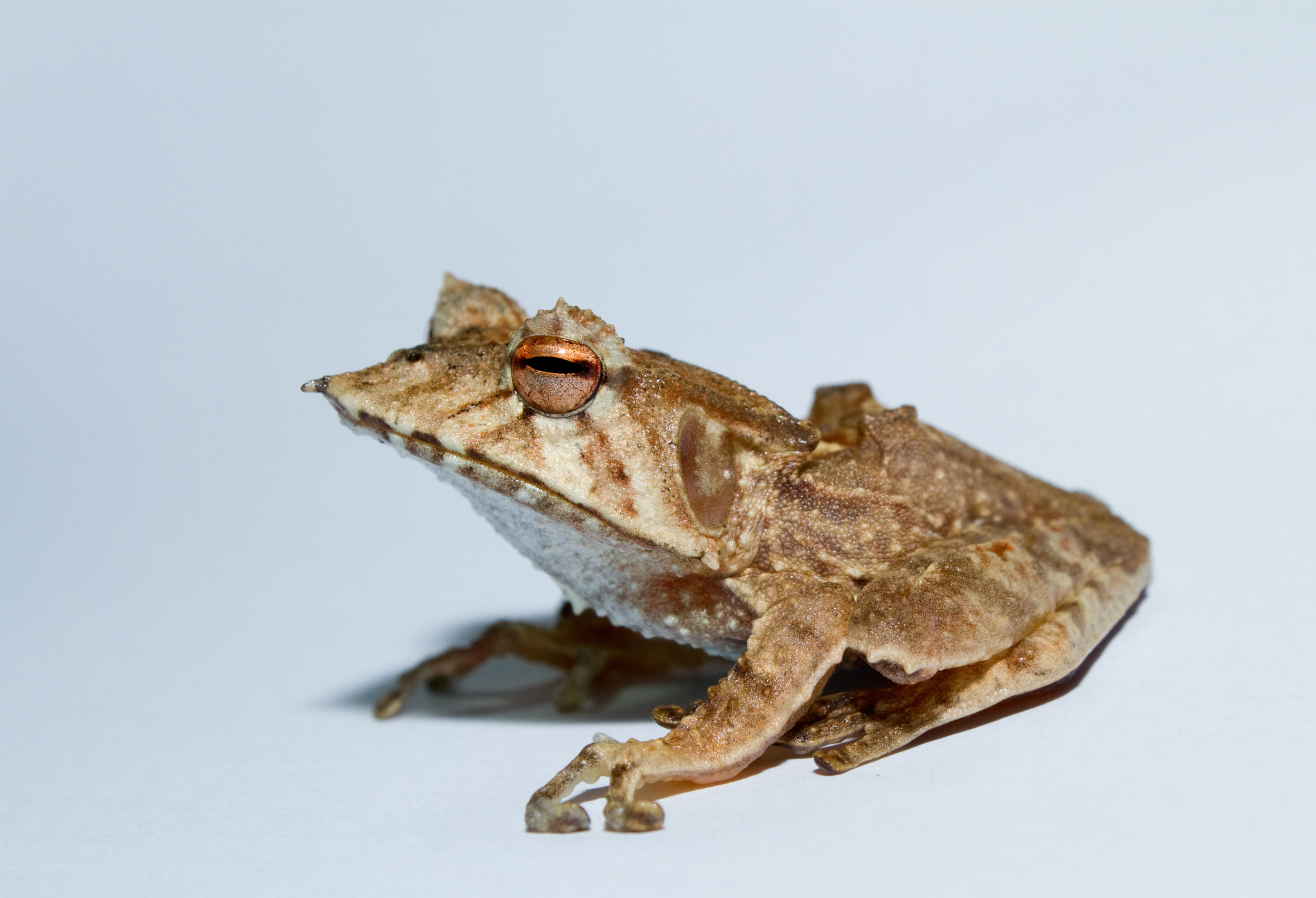

Conservation status
- Critically Endangered (IUCN 3.1)

Scientific classification
- Kingdom: Animalia
- Phylum: Chordata
- Class: Amphibia
- Order: Anura
- Family: Hemiphractidae
- Genus: Hemiphractus
- Species: H. panamensis

Binomial name
- Hemiphractus panamensis (Stejneger, 1917)

Synonyms
- Cerathyla panamensis Stejneger, 1917

= Hemiphractus panamensis =

Species of frog

Hemiphractus panamensis is a species of frog in the family Hemiphractidae. It is found in Panama.

== Habitat ==
This frog lives in rainy submontane forests. Scientists do not believe it is tolerant to habitat disturbance. Scientists have reported the frog 750 m (2,460 ft) above sea level.

Scientists have reported the frog in protected places: Parque Nacional Chagres, Parque Nacional Porto Bello, and Area de Silvestre Corregimiento de Narganá.

== Reproduction ==
The female frog carries her eggs on her back. This frog breeds through direct development with no free-swimming tadpole stage.

== Threats ==
The IUCN classifies this species as critically endangered. The fungal disease chytridiomycosis poses a significant threat. In some parts of its range, it is also at risk from habitat loss associated with logging, agriculture, and cattle ranching.

== Original description and resurrection ==
- Stejneger, L. (1917). "A new species of horned tree-toad from Panama". Proceedings of the Biological Society of Washington. 30: 31–34.
- Hill RL; Martin KG; Stanley E; Mendelson JR III (2018). "A taxonomic review of the genus Hemiphractus (Anura: Hemiphractidae) in Panama: description of two new species, resurrection of Hemiphractus panamensis (Stejneger, 1917), and discussion of Hemiphractus fasciatus Peters, 1862". Zootaxa (Abstract). 4429: 495–512. doi:10.11646/zootaxa.4429.3.3.
