= Riama meleagris =

Conservation status
- Near Threatened (IUCN 3.1)

Scientific classification
- Kingdom: Animalia
- Phylum: Chordata
- Class: Reptilia
- Order: Squamata
- Family: Gymnophthalmidae
- Genus: Riama
- Species: R. meleagris

Binomial name
- Riama meleagris (Boulenger, 1885)

Species of lizard

Riama meleagris, the brown lightbulb lizard, is a species of lizard in the family Gymnophthalmidae. It is endemic to Ecuador.
