= Riama cashcaensis =

Scientific classification
- Kingdom: Animalia
- Phylum: Chordata
- Class: Reptilia
- Order: Squamata
- Family: Gymnophthalmidae
- Genus: Riama
- Species: R. cashcaensis

Binomial name
- Riama cashcaensis (Kizirian & Coloma, 1991)

Species of lizard

Riama cashcaensis, Kizorian's lightbulb lizard, is a species of lizard in the family Gymnophthalmidae. It is endemic to Ecuador.
