= Riama anatoloros =

Conservation status
- Vulnerable (IUCN 3.1)

Scientific classification
- Kingdom: Animalia
- Phylum: Chordata
- Class: Reptilia
- Order: Squamata
- Family: Gymnophthalmidae
- Genus: Riama
- Species: R. anatoloros

Binomial name
- Riama anatoloros (Kizirian, 1996)

Species of lizard

Riama anatoloros is a species of lizard in the family Gymnophthalmidae. It is endemic to Ecuador.
