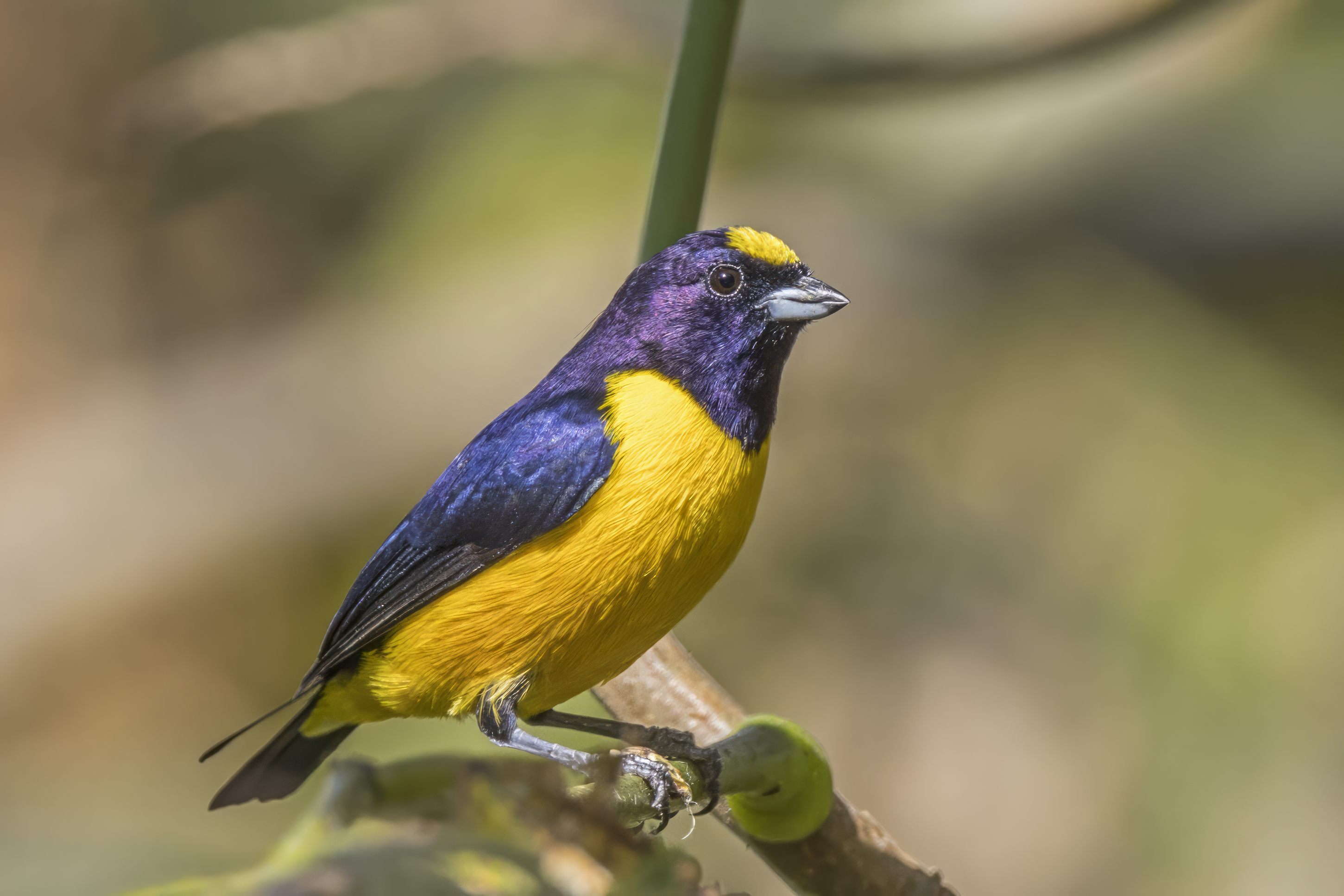
- Male at Anacuta, Tibacuy, Cundinamarca

Conservation status
- Least Concern (IUCN 3.1)

Scientific classification
- Kingdom: Animalia
- Phylum: Chordata
- Class: Aves
- Order: Passeriformes
- Family: Fringillidae
- Subfamily: Euphoniinae
- Genus: Euphonia
- Species: E. concinna

Binomial name
- Euphonia concinna P.L. Sclater, 1855

= Velvet-fronted euphonia =

Species of bird

The velvet-fronted euphonia (Euphonia concinna) is a species of bird in the family Fringillidae, the finches and euphonias. It is endemic to Colombia.

== Taxonomy and systematics ==
The velvet-fronted euphonia was originally described in 1855 with its current binomial Euphonia concinna. The genus Euphonia was long placed in the family Thraupidae, the "true" tanagers. Multiple studies in the late twentieth and early twenty-first centuries resulted in its being reassigned to its present place in the family Fringillidae.

The velvet-fronted euphonia is monotypic. However, some early twentieth century authors treated it and what are now the orange-crowned euphonia (E. saturata) and Finsch's euphonia (E. finschi) as conspecific.

== Description ==
The velvet-fronted euphonia is 9 to 10 cm (3.5 to 3.9 in) long and weighs 9 to 12 g (0.32 to 0.42 oz). The species is sexually dimorphic. Adult males have a small yellow forecrown; the color extends just to the eye and is separated from the bill by a thin black line. The rest of their head and their upperparts are blue-black with a purplish gloss. Their tail is also blue-black. Their flight feathers are black with usually a small white spot at the base of the outer primaries. Their chin and throat are blue-black and the rest of their underparts are rich ochraceous to cinnamon-yellow. Adult females have a mostly light olive-gray head with a short faint olive-yellow supercilium. Their upperparts, wings, and tail are olive. Their throat and underparts are yellowish with an olive tinge. Both sexes have a dark brown iris, a pale bluish gray bill with a blackish tip, and dark gray legs and feet.

== Distribution and habitat ==
The velvet-fronted euphonia is found only in the upper Magdalena River valley of Colombia between northern Tolima and southwestern Huila departments. It is found primarily along the edges of dry, sometimes patchy, woodlands and also in ranchland with scattered trees and along lightly wooded streams. Sources differ on its elevation range. One says it is 200 to 1,000 m (700 to 3,300 ft) and locally to 1,800 m (5,900 ft). Another says it is 200 to 2,000 m (700 to 6,600 ft).

== Behavior ==
=== Movement ===
The velvet-fronted euphonia is a resident species and apparently does not wander like others of its genus.

=== Feeding ===
The velvet-fronted euphonia feeds primarily on the fruits of mistletoe (Loranthaceae) and other small fruits, and is assumed to include small numbers of insects in its diet. It forages mostly in pairs or family groups. It seldom associates with other euphonias but will share fruiting trees with other birds. It usually forages high in trees.

=== Breeding ===
The velvet-fronted euphonia's breeding season includes at least January to April but nothing else is known about the species' breeding biology.

=== Vocalization ===
The male, and possibly the female, velvet-fronted euphonia sings "a slightly gravelly and varied series of phrases, e.g. p’wheeet-wheeet...pa’weet, whe’e’e’t, whe’e’e’t...pa’weet, p’bzrrrr, bzrrrr..." whose wheeet notes rise in pitch and are sometimes slightly burry. The bzrrrr notes are buzzy or rattling. Both sexes call with "a clear high dee-dee or tee dee-dee".

== Status ==
The IUCN has assessed the velvet-fronted euphonia as being of Least Concern. It has a restricted range; its population size is not known and is believed to be decreasing. No immediate threats have been identified. It is considered uncommon. "There are no parks or reserves within this species’ range, which does, however, include extensive scrub, ranchland, riverine woodland and dry semi-open areas which are at little risk of development and are apparently suitable for the requirements this species."
