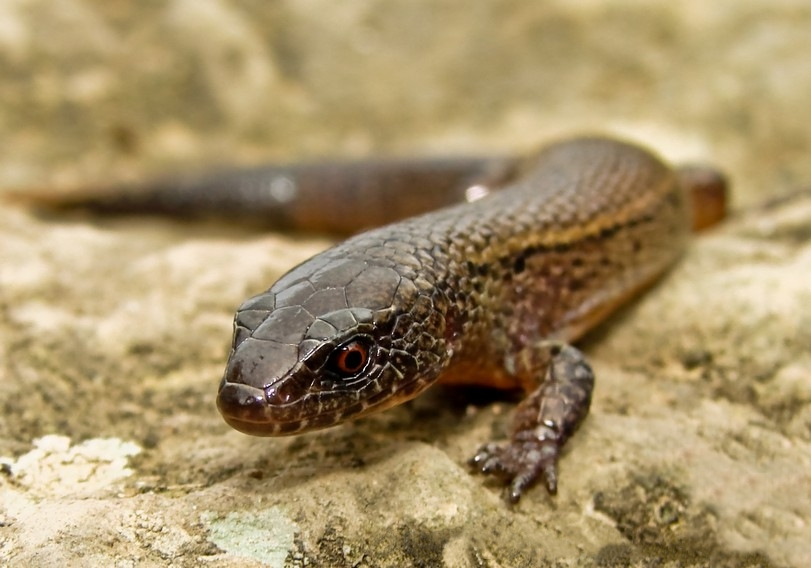

Scientific classification
- Kingdom: Animalia
- Phylum: Chordata
- Class: Reptilia
- Order: Squamata
- Family: Gymnophthalmidae
- Genus: Riama
- Species: R. striata

Binomial name
- Riama striata (Peters, 1863)

= Riama striata =

Species of lizard

Riama striata, the striped lightbulb lizard, is a species of lizard in the family Gymnophthalmidae. It is endemic to Colombia.
