= Hemiphractus helioi =

Conservation status
- Least Concern (IUCN 3.1)

Scientific classification
- Kingdom: Animalia
- Phylum: Chordata
- Class: Amphibia
- Order: Anura
- Family: Hemiphractidae
- Genus: Hemiphractus
- Species: H. helioi

Binomial name
- Hemiphractus helioi Sheil and Mendelson, 2001

Species of frog

Helio's horned tree frog, cusco triangular-headed frog, or rana de casco de helio (Hemiphractus helioi) is a species of frog in the family Hemiphractidae. It is found in the upper Amazon basin and lower Amazonian slopes of the Andes from Ecuador to southern Peru and into adjacent Brazil (Acre). There is also a disputed record from northern Bolivia. Prior to its formal description in 2001, it was confused with Hemiphractus johnsoni.

== Description ==
This frog measures about 52.7 mm long in snout-vent length. At night, the skin of the dorsum is light brown with some darker marks and its belly is cream-white. During the day, the skin of the dorsum is pink-brown in color with brown marks and the belly is gray-white in color with gray-brown marks on the belly and legs. The iris of the eye is pink-brown in color with black marks.

== Habitat ==
This nocturnal, arboreal frog has been sene on plants 0.3 to 0.7 m (1 ft 0 in to 2 ft 4 in) above the ground. It mostly lives in primary forest but has been seen in secondary forest. Scientists have seen the frog between 300 and 2,000 m (980 and 6,560 ft) above sea level.

Scientists have reported the frog in protected places: Santa Cruz Forest Reserve, Reserva Comunal El Sira, Parque Nacional Manu, Parque Nacional Natural Cueva de los Guacharos, and Parque Nacional da Serra do Divisor.

== Food ==
This frog preys upon other frogs.

== Reproduction ==
The female frog carries her young on her back. Scientists have seen as many as 18 young on a single female's back at one time. This species breeds through direct development with no free-swimming tadpole stage.

== Threats ==
The IUCN classifies this species as least concern of extinction. The principal threats are habitat loss in favor of logging, mining, farming, and livestock cultivation.
