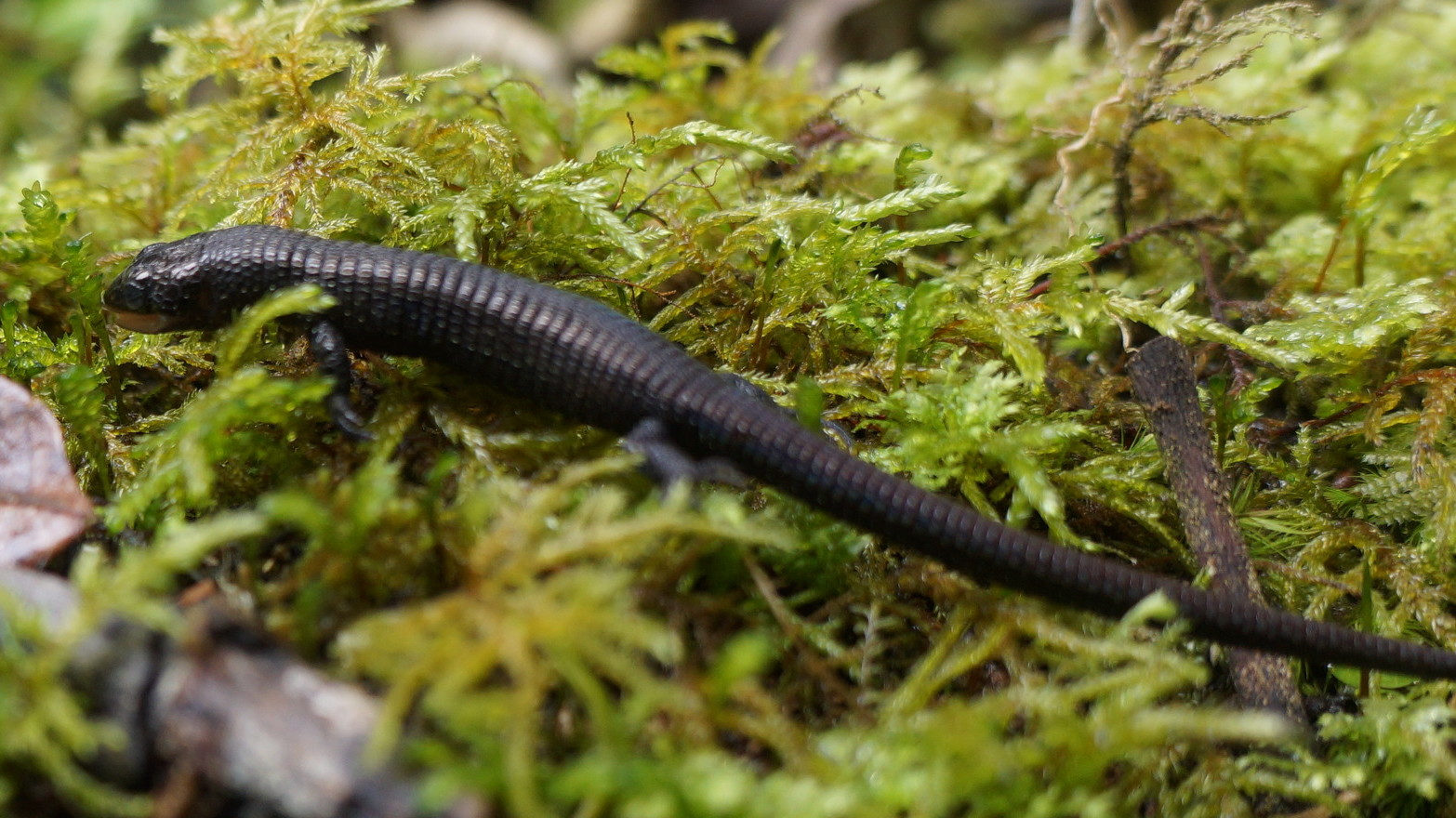

Conservation status
- Endangered (IUCN 3.1)

Scientific classification
- Kingdom: Animalia
- Phylum: Chordata
- Class: Reptilia
- Order: Squamata
- Family: Gymnophthalmidae
- Genus: Riama
- Species: R. balneator

Binomial name
- Riama balneator (Kizirian, 1996)

= Riama balneator =

Species of lizard

Riama balneator is a species of lizard in the family Gymnophthalmidae. It is endemic to Ecuador.
