= Riama simotera =

Conservation status
- Endangered (IUCN 3.1)

Scientific classification
- Kingdom: Animalia
- Phylum: Chordata
- Class: Reptilia
- Order: Squamata
- Family: Gymnophthalmidae
- Genus: Riama
- Species: R. simotera

Binomial name
- Riama simotera (O'Shaughnessy, 1879)

Species of lizard

Riama simotera, O'Shaughnessy's lightbulb lizard, is a species of lizard in the family Gymnophthalmidae. It is endemic to Ecuador.
