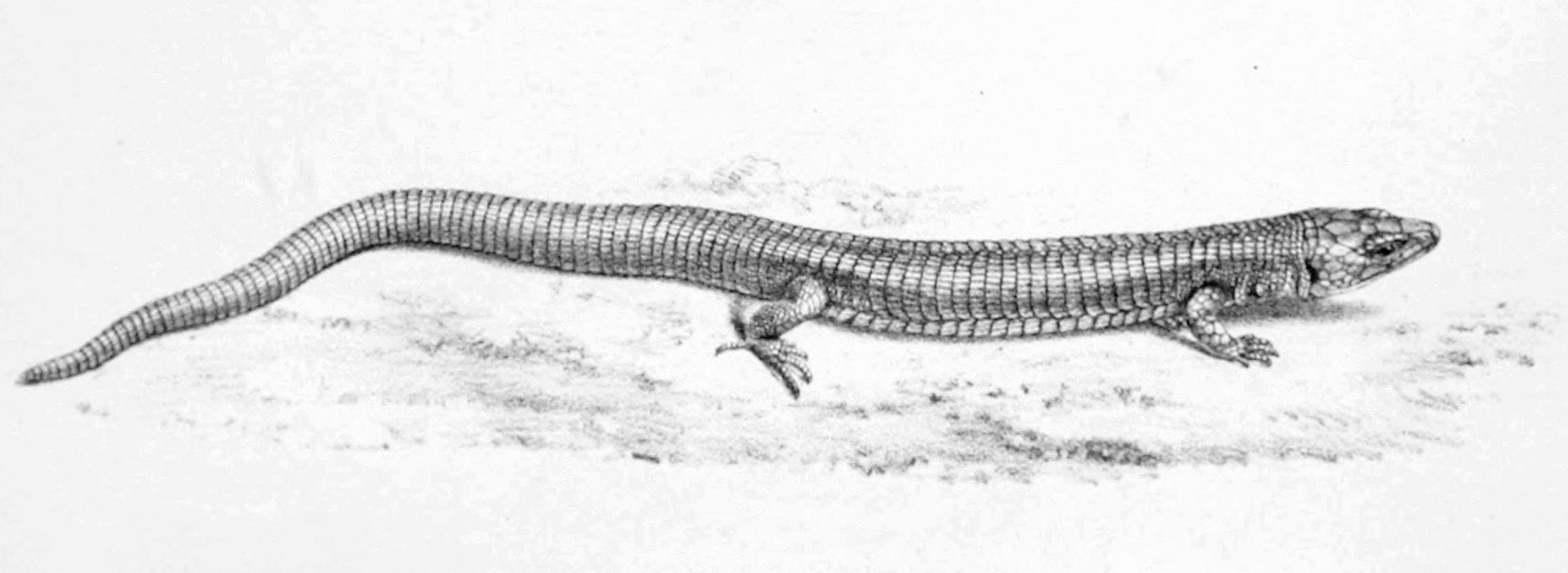

Scientific classification
- Kingdom: Animalia
- Phylum: Chordata
- Class: Reptilia
- Order: Squamata
- Family: Gymnophthalmidae
- Genus: Riama
- Species: R. unicolor

Binomial name
- Riama unicolor Gray, 1858

= Riama unicolor =

Species of lizard

Riama unicolor, the drab lightbulb lizard, is a species of lizard in the family Gymnophthalmidae. It is endemic to Ecuador.
