= Riama inanis =

Conservation status
- Data Deficient (IUCN 3.1)

Scientific classification
- Kingdom: Animalia
- Phylum: Chordata
- Class: Reptilia
- Order: Squamata
- Family: Gymnophthalmidae
- Genus: Riama
- Species: R. inanis

Binomial name
- Riama inanis (Doan & Schargel, 2003)

Species of lizard

Riama inanis is a species of lizard in the family Gymnophthalmidae.
