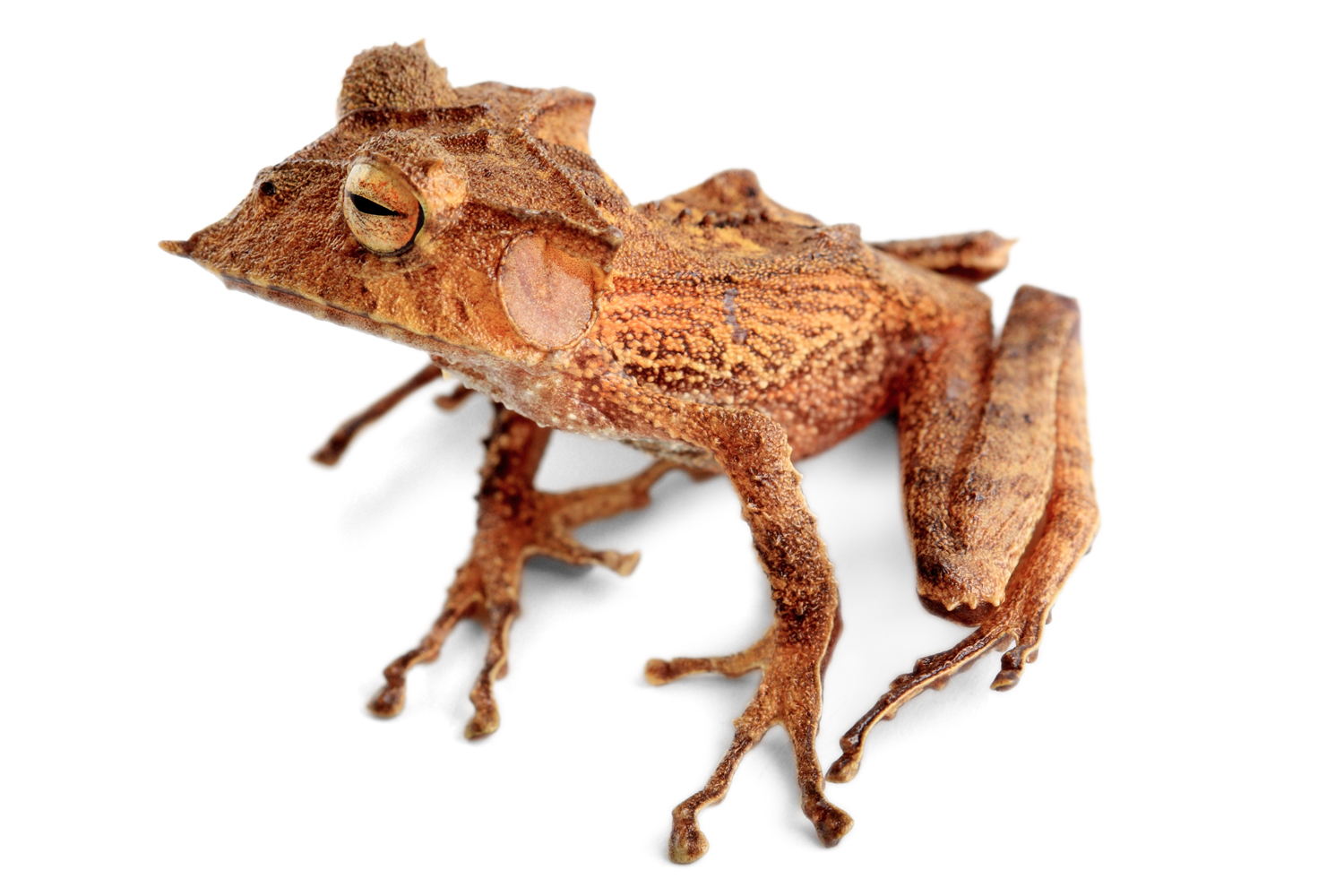

Conservation status
- Vulnerable (IUCN 3.1)

Scientific classification
- Kingdom: Animalia
- Phylum: Chordata
- Class: Amphibia
- Order: Anura
- Family: Hemiphractidae
- Genus: Hemiphractus
- Species: H. bubalus

Binomial name
- Hemiphractus bubalus (Jiménez de la Espada, 1870)

Synonyms
- Cerathyla bubalus Jiménez de la Espada, 1870; Cerathyla braconnieri Jiménez de la Espada, 1870; Cerathyla palmarum Jiménez de la Espada, 1870

= Hemiphractus bubalus =

Species of frog

Hemiphractus bubalus, the Ecuador horned tree frog, is a species of frog in the family Hemiphractidae. It is found in the upper Amazon Basin and lower Amazonian slopes of the Andes in northern Peru, Ecuador, and southern Colombia (Cordillera Oriental in Caquetá and Putumayo Departments).

== Habitat ==
Its natural habitat is dense cloud forest. It is typically found perching on branches of bushes and small trees. It is assumed to be a predator of other frog species. It is only present in places with high densities of other frogs. Scientists have seen the frog between 300 and 2,000 m (980 and 6,560 ft) above sea level.

Scientists have seen the frog in protected places, for example, Parque Nacional Cayambe-Coca and Parque Nacional Sumaco Napo-Galeras.

== Description ==
The adult male frog averages 43.8 mm in snout-vent length and the adult female frog about 57.9 mm long.

== Reproduction ==
The female frog carries her eggs on her back. This frog breeds through direct development. Its eggs hatch into small froglets, not swimming tadpoles.

== Threats ==
The IUCN classifies these frogs as vulnerable to extinction. This frog requires pristine forests, and it is at risk from habitat loss. Humans cut down forest for logging and to build infrastructure, living space, and both crop and livestock farms. In some parts of its range, this frog is also in danger from mining.
