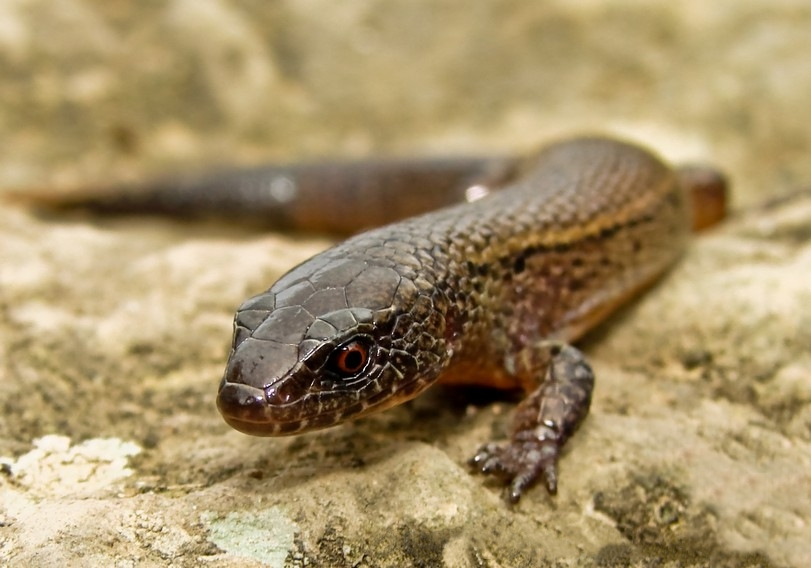
- Riama striata

Scientific classification
- Kingdom: Animalia
- Phylum: Chordata
- Class: Reptilia
- Order: Squamata
- Family: Gymnophthalmidae
- Genus: Riama; Gray, 1858

= Riama =

Genus of lizards

Riama is a genus of lizards in the family Gymnophthalmidae. The genus is endemic to South America.

== Species ==
The genus Riama contains 16 species which are recognized as being valid.

- Riama anatoloros (Kizirian, 1996)
- Riama antioquensis Arredondo, 2013
- Riama balneator (Kizirian, 1996)
- Riama cashcaensis (Kizirian & Coloma, 1991) – Kizorian's lightbulb lizard
- Riama colomaromani (Kizirian, 1996)
- Riama columbiana (Andersson, 1914) – Colombian lightbulb lizard
- Riama inanis (Doan & Schargel, 2003)
- Riama labionis (Kizirian, 1996)
- Riama meleagris (Boulenger, 1885) – brown lightbulb lizard
- Riama orcesi (Kizirian, 1995)
- Riama raneyi (Kizirian, 1996)
- Riama simotera (O'Shaughnessy, 1879) – O'Shaughnessy's lightbulb lizard
- Riama stigmatoral (Kizirian, 1996)
- Riama striata (W. Peters, 1863) – striped lightbulb lizard,
- Riama unicolor Gray, 1858 – drab lightbulb lizard
- Riama yumborum Aguirre-Peñafiel, Torres-Carvajal, Sales-Nunes, Peck & Maddock, 2014

Nota bene: A binomial authority in parentheses indicates that the species was originally described in a genus other than Riama.
