= Riama colomaromani =

Conservation status
- Endangered (IUCN 3.1)

Scientific classification
- Kingdom: Animalia
- Phylum: Chordata
- Class: Reptilia
- Order: Squamata
- Family: Gymnophthalmidae
- Genus: Riama
- Species: R. colomaromani

Binomial name
- Riama colomaromani (Kizirian, 1996)

Synonyms
- Proctoporus colomaromani Kizirian, 1996; Riama colomaromani — Doan & Castoe, 2005

Species of lizard

Riama colomaromani is a species of lizard in the family Gymnophthalmidae. The species is endemic to Ecuador.

== Etymology ==
The specific name, colomaromani, is in honor of Ecuadorian herpetologist Luis Aurelio Coloma Román.

== Geographic range ==
R. colomaromani is found in Pichincha Province, Ecuador.

== Habitat ==
The preferred natural habitat of R. colomaromani is forest, at altitudes of 1,300–2,822 m (4,265–9,259 ft).

== Reproduction ==
R. colomaromani is oviparous.
