= Riama raneyi =

Scientific classification
- Kingdom: Animalia
- Phylum: Chordata
- Class: Reptilia
- Order: Squamata
- Family: Gymnophthalmidae
- Genus: Riama
- Species: R. raneyi

Binomial name
- Riama raneyi (Kizirian, 1996)

Synonyms
- Proctoporus raneyi Kizirian, 1996; Riama raneyi — Doan & Schargel, 2003

Species of lizard

Riama raneyi is a species of lizard in the family Gymnophthalmidae. The species is endemic to Ecuador.

== Etymology ==
The specific name, raneyi, is in honor of Richard H. Raney, mayor of Lawrence, Kansas (1967–1968), for his support of the University of Kansas Natural History Museum.

== Geographic range ==
R. raneyi is found in Napo Province, Ecuador, at altitudes of 2,000–2,910 m (6,560–9,550 ft).

== Reproduction ==
R. raneyi is oviparous.
