= Hemiphractus scutatus =

Conservation status
- Least Concern (IUCN 3.1)

Scientific classification
- Kingdom: Animalia
- Phylum: Chordata
- Class: Amphibia
- Order: Anura
- Family: Hemiphractidae
- Genus: Hemiphractus
- Species: H. scutatus

Binomial name
- Hemiphractus scutatus (Spix, 1824)

Synonyms
- Rana scutata Spix, 1824; Hemiphractus boulengeri Miranda-Ribeiro, 1926; Hemiphractus divaricatus Cope, 1868; Hemiphractus spixii Wagler, 1828

Species of amphibian

Hemiphractus scutatus, also known as Spix's horned treefrog, is a species of frog in the family Hemiphractidae. It is found in the upper Amazon basin in Bolivia, western Brazil, Peru, Ecuador, and southern Colombia.

== Description ==
The adult male frog averages 36.9–62 mm in snout-vent length and the adult female frog 60.4–81 mm. The skin of the dorsum is brown-red in color with darker marks. The skin of the ventral areas is lighter in color.

== Habitat ==
This terrestrial frog has been observed both during the day and at night. It has been observed on the leaf litter and on low plants. It has been found only in pristine primary forests. Scientists have seen the frog between 60 and 3,300 m (200 and 10,830 ft) above sea level.

There are protected areas in the frog's range: Parque Nacional Yasuní, Parque Nacional Sumaco Napo-Galeras, Parque Nacional Llanganates, Parque Nacional Sangay, Parque Nacional Manu, Parque Nacional Natural Amacayacu, Parque Nacional Natural El Puré, PARNA da Serra do Divisor, and PARNA Mapinguari.
