= Hemiphractus proboscideus =

Conservation status
- Least Concern (IUCN 3.1)

Scientific classification
- Kingdom: Animalia
- Phylum: Chordata
- Class: Amphibia
- Order: Anura
- Family: Hemiphractidae
- Genus: Hemiphractus
- Species: H. proboscideus

Binomial name
- Hemiphractus proboscideus (Jiménez de la Espada, 1870)

Synonyms
- Cerathyla proboscidea Jiménez de la Espada, 1870; Ceratohyla cristata Andersson, 1945

Species of frog

Hemiphractus proboscideus, or the Sumaco horned treefrog, is a species of frog in the family Hemiphractidae. It is found in the upper Amazon basin in extreme southwestern Colombia (Amazonas and Caquetá Departments), Ecuador, and northern Peru.

== Description ==
Males measure 43–50 mm (1.7–2.0 in) and females 52–67 mm (2.0–2.6 in) in snout–vent length. The head is triangular in dorsal view. Snout is elongated to a proboscis, and there is a large conical and several small tubercles on the eyes. At night, the body is yellowish with brown diagonal or transverse bars and with crossbars in the extremities; the belly is grayish-cream to white. By day, the back is brown with darker brown markings; the ventral surface is brown to reddish brown with orange or yellow spots on the belly, and yellow or white spots on the gular region. Tongue is orange.

== Reproduction and behaviour ==
Reproduction seems to occur throughout year as juveniles have been encountered during all months. Development is direct, and the female carries her eggs on her back.

Hemiphractus proboscideus is a predatory species that eats other frogs. At night, they are typically found sitting on low vegetation. When disturbed, the frog will open its mouth to show its bright-coloured tongue. They can deliver a strong bite.

== Habitat and conservation ==
Its natural habitats are moist tropical forest at elevations of 100–1,200 m (330–3,940 ft) asl. It is a rare species. No major threats have been identified, but it has declined in Ecuador for unknown reasons. Its range includes several protected areas: Reserva de Producción Faunística Cuyabeno, Parque Nacional Yasuní, Parque Nacional Sumaco Napo-Galeras, Parque Nacional Llanganates, and Parque Nacional Sangay. It has been affirmatively reported in Parque Nacional Natural Amacayacu. Scientists believe it may also live in Peru's Gueppi Reserved Zone.
