= Riama antioquensis =

Conservation status
- Vulnerable (IUCN 3.1)

Scientific classification
- Kingdom: Animalia
- Phylum: Chordata
- Class: Reptilia
- Order: Squamata
- Family: Gymnophthalmidae
- Genus: Riama
- Species: R. antioquensis

Binomial name
- Riama antioquensis Arredondo, 2013

Species of lizard

Riama antioquensis is a species of lizard in the family Gymnophthalmidae. It is endemic to Colombia and has been recorded in the Antioquia and Caldas Departments.
