= Riama orcesi =

Conservation status
- Vulnerable (IUCN 3.1)

Scientific classification
- Kingdom: Animalia
- Phylum: Chordata
- Class: Reptilia
- Order: Squamata
- Family: Gymnophthalmidae
- Genus: Riama
- Species: R. orcesi

Binomial name
- Riama orcesi (Kizirian, 1995)

Synonyms
- Proctoporus orcesi Kizirian, 1995; Riama orcesi — Doan & Castoe, 2005

Species of lizard

Riama orcesi is a species of lizard in the family Gymnophthalmidae. The species is endemic to Ecuador.

== Etymology ==
The specific name, orcesi, is in honor of Ecuadorian herpetologist Gustavo Orcés.

== Description ==
The dorsal scales of Riama orcesi are rectangular and juxtaposed, each with a low rounded keel. Males have a series of 10–14 femoral pores, which may be continuous or interrupted by one or two scales. Femoral pores are absent in females. The body is brown dorsally, with a pale dorsolateral stripe on each side.

== Geographic range ==
Riama orcesi is found in northeastern Ecuador at altitudes of 1,100–2,460 m (3,610–8,070 ft).

== Habitat ==
The preferred natural habitat of Riama orcesi is forest, at elevations of 1,635–2,700 m (5,364–8,858 ft), but it has also been found on grassy hillsides under logs and rocks.

== Behavior ==
Riama orcesi is terrestrial.

== Reproduction ==
Riama orcesi is oviparous.
