= Atelopus quimbaya =

Conservation status
- Critically Endangered (IUCN 3.1)

Scientific classification
- Kingdom: Animalia
- Phylum: Chordata
- Class: Amphibia
- Order: Anura
- Family: Bufonidae
- Genus: Atelopus
- Species: A. quimbaya

Binomial name
- Atelopus quimbaya Ruíz-Carranza & Osorno-Muñoz, 1994

Species of amphibian

Atelopus quimbaya, the Quimbaya Toad, is a species of toad in the family Bufonidae. It is endemic to Colombia and known from the western slopes of the Cordillera Central in Risaralda, Quindío, and Caldas Departments. Its natural habitats are sub-Andean and Andean forests at altitudes of 1,650–2,940 m (5,410–9,650 ft) above sea level. Chytridiomycosis is a serious risk to this rare species.
