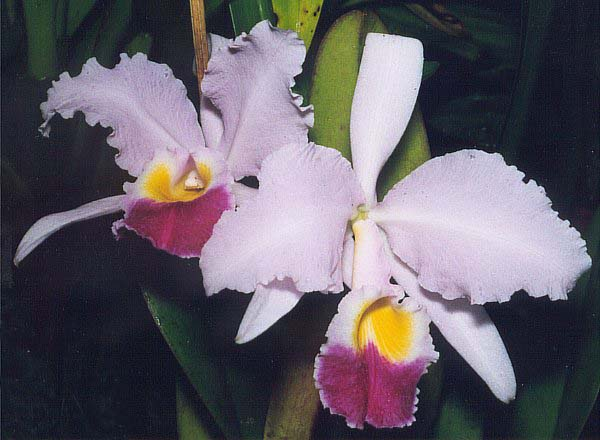

Conservation status
- CITES Appendix II

Scientific classification
- Kingdom: Plantae
- Clade: Tracheophytes
- Clade: Angiosperms
- Clade: Monocots
- Order: Asparagales
- Family: Orchidaceae
- Subfamily: Epidendroideae
- Genus: Cattleya
- Subgenus: Cattleya subg. Cattleya
- Section: Cattleya sect. Cattleya
- Species: C. trianae

Binomial name
- Cattleya trianae Linden & Rchb.f.

Synonyms
- List: Cattleya labiata var. trianae (Linden & Rchb.f.) Regel; Epidendrum labiatum var. trianae (Linden & Rchb.f.) Rchb.f.; Cattleya bogotensis Linden; Cattleya kimballiana L.Linden & Rodigas; Cattleya labiata var. ernestii Sander; Cattleya labiata subsp. massangeana Rchb.f.; Cattleya trianae Linden & Rchb.f.; Cattleya trianae f. alba (L.Linden & Rodigas) M.Wolff & O.Gruss; Cattleya trianae var. alba L.Linden & Rodigas; Cattleya trianae var. backhauseana T.Moore & Mast.; Cattleya trianae var. colemannii B.S.Williams; Cattleya trianae var. corningii B.S.Williams; Cattleya trianae f. crawshayana De B.Crawshay; Cattleya trianae var. dodgsonii B.S.Williams; Cattleya trianae var. formosa B.S.Williams; Cattleya trianae var. hillii B.S.Williams; Cattleya trianae var. hooleana B.S.Williams; Cattleya trianae var. marginata B.S.Williams; Cattleya trianae var. mariae Cogn. & A.Gooss.; Cattleya trianae var. massangeana (Rchb.f.) B.S.Williams; Cattleya trianae var. osmannii B.S.Williams; Cattleya trianae var. quadricolor B.S.Williams; Cattleya trianae var. reginae B.S.Williams; Cattleya trianae var. rosea B.S.Williams; Cattleya trianae var. russelliana B.S.Williams; Cattleya trianae var. splendidissima B.S.Williams & T.Moore; Cattleya trianae var. vanneriana Rchb.f.; Cattleya trianae var. williamsii B.S.Williams

= Cattleya trianae =

Flor de Mayo

Species of orchid

Cattleya trianae (Lind. & Rchb. fil), also known as Flor de Mayo ("May flower") or "Christmas orchid", is a species of flowering plant in the family Orchidaceae. It grows as an epiphytic orchid, with succulent leaves, endemic to Colombia where it was nominated as the national flower in November 1936. That year, the National Academy of History of Argentina asked the Latin American countries to participate in an exhibition with the representative flowers of each country. The Colombian government gave the botanist Emilio Robledo the task to designate the most representative flowering plant of the country.

The choice of Cattleya trianae was made for two main reasons:

- The lip is yellow, blue and red, in the same way as the Colombian flag.
- The species was named after the 19th century Colombian botanist José Jerónimo Triana.

The species grows at 1500–2000 meters above sea level, in Cloud forests. It is an endangered species due to habitat destruction.

The diploid chromosome number of C. trianae has been determined as 2n = 40. the haploid chromosome number has been determined as n = 20.
