= Atopophrynus =

Conservation status
- Critically Endangered (IUCN 3.1)

Scientific classification
- Kingdom: Animalia
- Phylum: Chordata
- Class: Amphibia
- Order: Anura
- Clade: Brachycephaloidea
- Genus: Atopophrynus; Lynch and Ruíz-Carranza, 1982
- Species: A. syntomopus

Binomial name
- Atopophrynus syntomopus Lynch and Ruiz-Carranza, 1982
- Atopophrynus syntomopus is only known from Sonsón, in the Cordillera Central of Colombia

Genus of amphibians

Atopophrynus is a genus of frogs. It is monotypic, being represented by a single species, Atopophrynus syntomopus, also known as the Sonson frog. Its taxonomic placement within the superfamily Brachycephaloidea is uncertain, although many sources place it in the family Craugastoridae. It is endemic to Colombia and only known from its type series from Sonsón, in the Cordillera Central, Antioquia Department.

== Description ==
The type series consists of three adult females, all measuring about 19 mm (0.7 in) in snout–vent length. The head is narrower than the body. The snout is short, oval in dorsal view and protruding in lateral view. Tympanum is absent. The canthus rostralis is rounded. Skin is smooth apart from a few scattered subconical tubercles dorsally. The fingers are basally webbed and, except the first one, bearing obvious rounded pads. The toes are almost fully webbed and bearing broad discs. Dorsal coloration is red with green markings overlain with white flecks, especially on the flanks. The lower parts are pale olive with blue-white spots edged with brown. The digital tips are yellow. The iris is bright copper.

All females were carrying large eggs in their ovaries; one of them had 12 eggs 1.8–2 mm (0.071–0.079 in)) in diameter.

== Habitat and conservation ==
The species is only known from three specimens that were collected in 1981 during daytime on wet rocks very close to a stream in primary forest at 2,870 m (9,420 ft) above sea level. Despite numerous surveys to the area of the type locality, no further specimens have been found. At present, the habitat at the type locality is completely degraded. It is unclear whether the species survives at or near the type locality.
