= Hemiphractus elioti =

Conservation status
- Critically Endangered (IUCN 3.1)

Scientific classification
- Kingdom: Animalia
- Phylum: Chordata
- Class: Amphibia
- Order: Anura
- Family: Hemiphractidae
- Genus: Hemiphractus
- Species: H. elioti

Binomial name
- Hemiphractus elioti Hill, Martin, Stanley, and Mendelson, 2018

Species of frog

Hemiphractus elioti is a species of frog in the family Hemiphractidae. It is found in Panama.

== Habitat ==
This frog lives in submontane primary forest, where it has been found on the ground and on low vegetation. Scientists have seen the frog between 600 and 1,600 metres (1,970 and 5,250 ft) above sea level.

Scientists have seen the frog in protected places: Long ago in Parque Internacional La Amistad, Reserva Forestal Fortuna, and El Copé and more recently in Area de Uso Múltiple Donoso.

== Reproduction ==
The female frog carries her young on her back. This frog breeds through direct development with no free-swimming tadpole stage.

== Threats ==
The IUCN classifies these frogs as critically endangered. The principal threats are deforestation and habitat loss through logging, agriculture, cattle husbandry, and copper mining.

There is a program under way at El Valle Amphibian Conservation Center.

== Original description ==
- Hill RL; Martin KG; Stanley E; Mendelson JR III (2018). "A taxonomic review of the genus Hemiphractus (Anura: Hemiphractidae) in Panama: description of two new species, resurrection of Hemiphractus panamensis (Stejneger, 1917), and discussion of Hemiphractus fasciatus Peters, 1862". Zootaxa (Abstract and references). 4429: 495–512. doi:10.11646/zootaxa.4429.3.3.
