= Hemiphractus kaylockae =

Conservation status
- Endangered (IUCN 3.1)

Scientific classification
- Kingdom: Animalia
- Phylum: Chordata
- Class: Amphibia
- Order: Anura
- Family: Hemiphractidae
- Genus: Hemiphractus
- Species: H. kaylockae

Binomial name
- Hemiphractus kaylockae Hill, Martin, Stanley, and Mendelson, 2018

Species of amphibian

Hemiphractus kaylockae is a species of frog in the family Hemiphractidae. It is found in Panama.

== Habitat ==
This frog is found in moist cloud and other forests. People have observed the frog perched on plants 1 m (3 ft 3 in) above the ground. Scientists say the frog is not good at living in altered or disturbed habitats. Scientists have seen the frog between 300 and 2,000 m (980 and 6,560 ft) above sea level.

Scientists have seen the frog in a protected place: Parque Nacional Darien.

== Reproduction ==
The female frog carries her eggs on her back. The frog breeds by direct development with no free-swimming tadpole stage.

== Threats ==
The IUCN classifies this frog as endangered. Principal threats include the fungus Batrachochytrium dendrobatidis, which causes chytridiomycosis. While the frog's habitat is relatively inaccessible to human activity, fires set at lower elevations may send smoke and ash further upland. Climate change may harm this frog because it lives high in the mountain ridges.

== Original description ==
- Hill RL; Martin KG; Stanley E; Mendelson JR III (2018). "A taxonomic review of the genus Hemiphractus (Anura: Hemiphractidae) in Panama: description of two new species, resurrection of Hemiphractus panamensis (Stejneger, 1917), and discussion of Hemiphractus fasciatus Peters, 1862". Zootaxa (Abstract and references). 4429: 495–512. doi:10.11646/zootaxa.4429.3.3. PMID 30313254.
