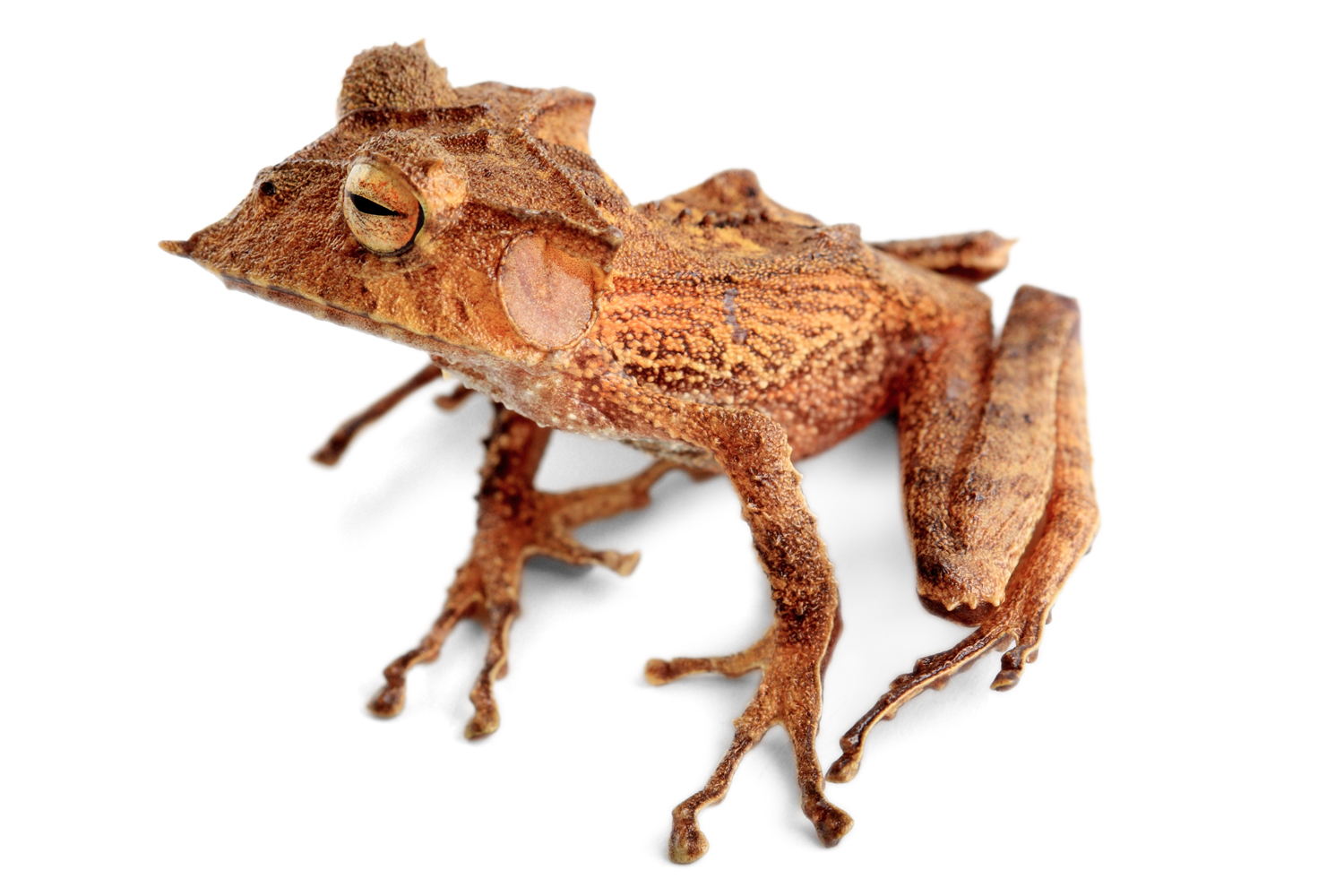
- Hemiphractus bubalus

Scientific classification
- Domain: Eukaryota
- Kingdom: Animalia
- Phylum: Chordata
- Class: Amphibia
- Order: Anura
- Family: Hemiphractidae
- Genus: Hemiphractus; Wagler, 1828

Diversity
- See text

Synonyms
- Cerathyla Jiménez de la Espada, 1870

= Hemiphractus =

Genus of amphibians

Hemiphractus is a genus of frogs, the horned treefrogs, in the family Hemiphractidae. These overall brownish frogs have a pointed snout and a casque on the head. They are nocturnal, relatively rare and native to humid lowland and highland forests in northern South America (Amazon east as far as Tapajós, Chocó-Magdalena and northern Andes) and Panama, where typically found on the ground or at relatively low levels in vegetation.

== Description ==
Hemiphractus are robust-bodied frogs. The genus is characterized by a fleshy proboscis on the tip of the snout and fleshy tubercles on the eyelids, skull that is highly casqued with prominent lateral occipital processes projecting backwards, and fang-like maxillary and premaxillary teeth. Females grow larger than males, and depending on exact species the snout–to–vent length generally is between c. 2.5 and 8 cm (1.0–3.1 in).

== Behaviour ==
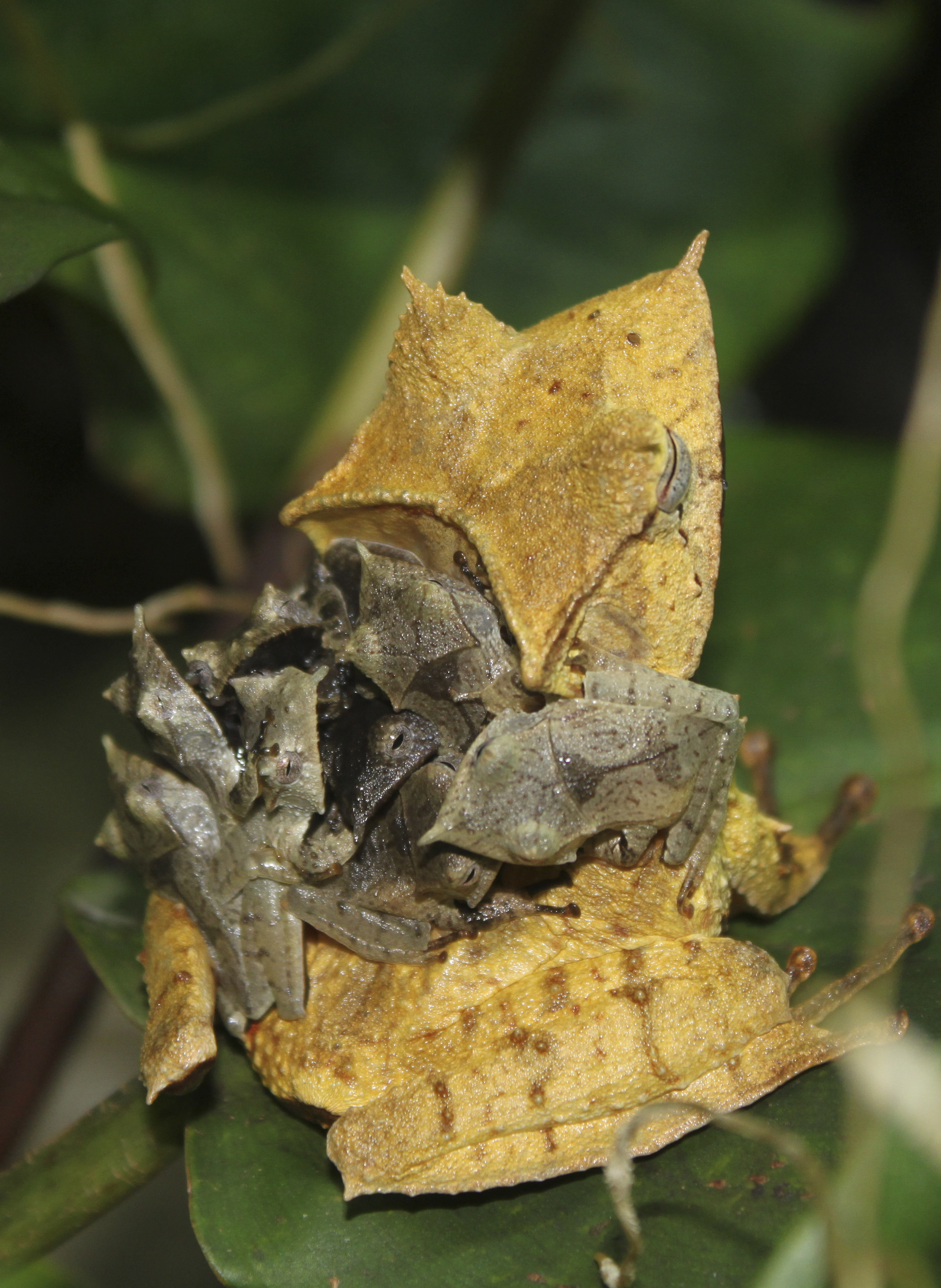
A female H. elioti with young on her back. This individual is part of the captive breeding project at El Valle Amphibian Conservation Center, Panama

Hemiphractus are believed to be specialized predators of other frogs, and hence confined to areas with high density of frogs. Nevertheless, they have also been recorded feeding on lizards, large insects and snails in the wild, and in addition to other frogs captive Hemiphractus will eat geckos, newborn mice and earthworms.

They can threaten any would-be predator by opening their mouth, exposing the bright yellow inside and tongue. If this fails to scare an adversary, they willingly bite, which is relatively painful for a frog of their size.

Female frogs carry eggs openly on their back; the eggs adhere to the mother's back with gelatinous material. Eggs hatch as fully developed froglets. H. elioti (previously included in H. fasciatus) are bred and maintained by the El Valle Amphibian Conservation Center in Panama. Although they have proven relatively difficult to keep in captivity, keeping and breeding has been achieved at levels where its conservation through such measures is considered possible, although (as of 2015 where the total captive population was 36 individuals) additional founders are necessary.

== Species ==
The following species are recognized in the genus Hemiphractus .

- Hemiphractus bubalus (Jiménez de la Espada, 1871)
- Hemiphractus elioti Hill, Martin, Stanley, and Mendelson, 2018
- Hemiphractus fasciatus Peters, 1862
- Hemiphractus helioi Sheil & Mendelson, 2001
- Hemiphractus johnsoni (Noble, 1917)
- Hemiphractus kaylockae Hill, Martin, Stanley, and Mendelson, 2018
- Hemiphractu panamensis (Stejneger, 1917)
- Hemiphractus proboscideus (Jiménez de la Espada, 1871)
- Hemiphractus scutatus (Spix, 1824)

Until 2001, populations now recognized as H. helioi were typically included in H. johnsoni, and until 2018 populations now recognized as H. elioti, H. kaylockae and H. panamensis were typically included in H. fasciatus. Colombian "H. fasciatus" may represent a currently unrecognized species (thus limiting true H. fasciatus to Ecuador), and it is possible that H. scutatus is a species complex.
