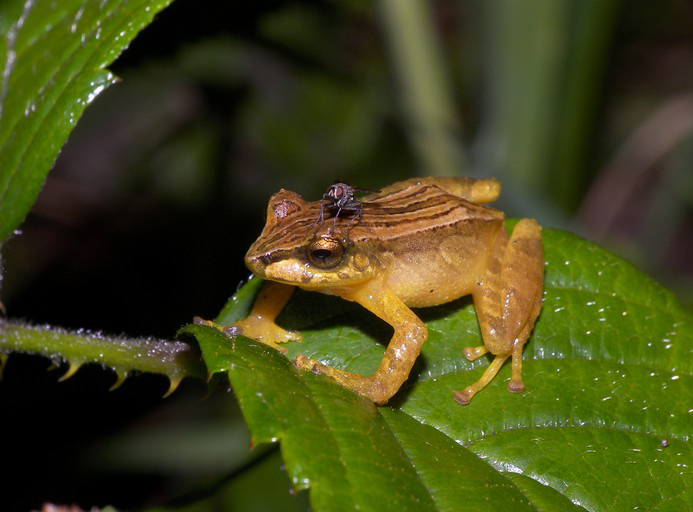

Conservation status
- Vulnerable (IUCN 3.1)

Scientific classification
- Kingdom: Animalia
- Phylum: Chordata
- Class: Amphibia
- Order: Anura
- Clade: Brachycephaloidea
- Family: Craugastoridae
- Genus: Pristimantis
- Species: P. dorsopictus

Binomial name
- Pristimantis dorsopictus (Rivero & Serna, 1988)

Synonyms
- Eleutherodactylus dorsopictus Rivero and Serna, 1988

= Pristimantis dorsopictus =

Species of frog

Pristimantis dorsopictus is a species of frog in the family Strabomantidae. It is endemic to Colombia. Its natural habitats are tropical moist montane forests and high-altitude grassland. It is threatened by habitat loss.

== Images ==
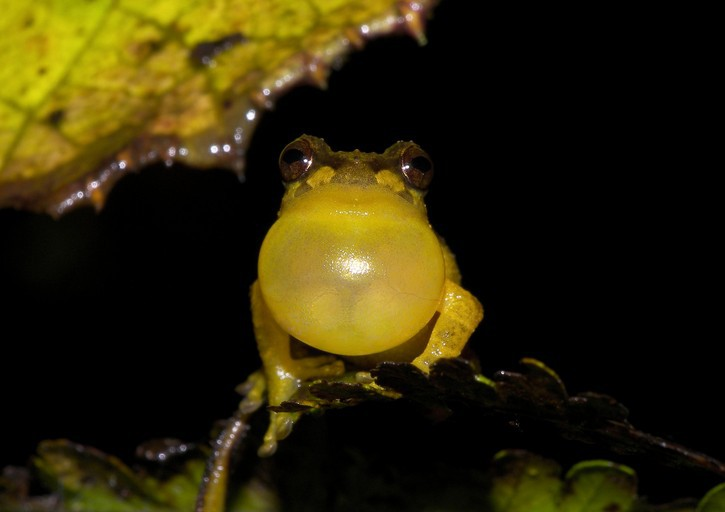

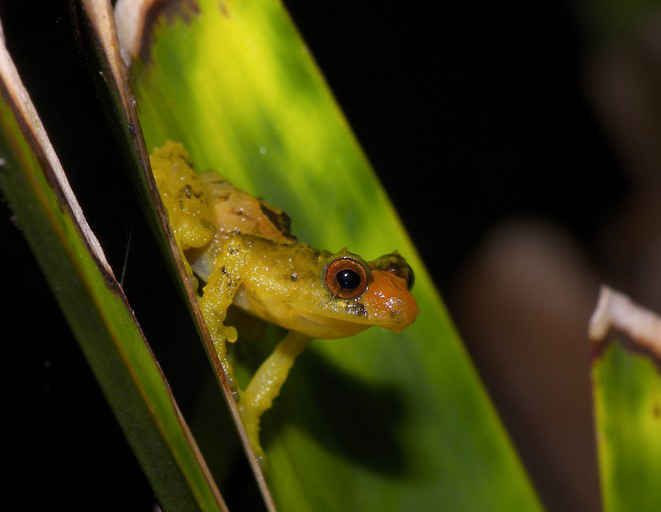
