= Pristimantis bernali =

Conservation status
- Critically Endangered (IUCN 3.1)

Scientific classification
- Kingdom: Animalia
- Phylum: Chordata
- Class: Amphibia
- Order: Anura
- Clade: Brachycephaloidea
- Family: Craugastoridae
- Genus: Pristimantis
- Species: P. bernali

Binomial name
- Pristimantis bernali (Lynch, 1986)

Synonyms
- Eleutherodactylus bernali Lynch, 1986

Species of frog

Pristimantis bernali is a species of frog in the family Strabomantidae. It is endemic to Colombia. Its natural habitat is tropical moist montane forests.

It is threatened by habitat loss and is classified as critically endangered by the IUCN Red List of Threatened Species. It reproduces by direct development.
