= Pristimantis lemur =

Conservation status
- Vulnerable (IUCN 3.1)

Scientific classification
- Kingdom: Animalia
- Phylum: Chordata
- Class: Amphibia
- Order: Anura
- Clade: Brachycephaloidea
- Family: Craugastoridae
- Genus: Pristimantis
- Species: P. lemur

Binomial name
- Pristimantis lemur (Lynch & Rueda-Almonacid, 1998)

Synonyms
- Eleutherodactylus lemur Lynch & Rueda-Almonacid, 1998

Species of frog

Pristimantis lemur is a species of frog in the family Strabomantidae. It is endemic to Colombia. Its natural habitat is tropical moist montane forests. It is threatened by habitat loss.
