= Pristimantis maculosus =

Conservation status
- Vulnerable (IUCN 3.1)

Scientific classification
- Kingdom: Animalia
- Phylum: Chordata
- Class: Amphibia
- Order: Anura
- Family: Strabomantidae
- Genus: Pristimantis
- Subgenus: Pristimantis
- Species: P. maculosus

Binomial name
- Pristimantis maculosus (Lynch, 1991)

Synonyms
- Eleutherodactylus maculosus Lynch, 1991

Species of frog

Pristimantis maculosus is a species of frog in the family Strabomantidae. It is endemic to Colombia and is only known from a few localities in the Cordillera Central in Caldas, Antioquia, and Quindío Departments. The specific name maculosus is Latin for "dappled" or "spotted" and refers to the pale spots on the hidden surfaces of this species. Common name spotted robber frog has been coined for it.

== Description ==
Adult males measure 18–19 mm (0.71–0.75 in) and adult females 24–26 mm (0.94–1.02 in) in snout–vent length. The head is narrower than the body. The snout is subacuminate in dorsal view and rounded in lateral view. The canthus rostralis and supra-tympanic fold are evident, the latter obscuring upper edge of tympanum. The fingers and toes bear fleshy lateral keels and rounded discs; toe discs are slightly smaller than those on fingers. Dorsal skin bears some scattered pustules. The dorsum is dark olive-brown to dark brow and has brown markings. The venter is bronze-brown to black. The flanks and the concealed parts of the limbs are black with white spots.

== Habitat and conservation ==
Pristimantis maculosus occurs in primary forests at elevations from 2,000 m (6,600 ft) or 2,560 m (8,400 ft) to 2,900 m (9,500 ft) above sea level. Individuals have been found on leaves and branches on high or medium strata. The type series was collected from low vegetation (about 0.3 m (1 ft) above the ground) along streams.

Pristimantis maculosus is a rare species that has been recorded only in one locality post-2010. It is threatened by habitat loss (deforestation) caused by logging and agriculture. It has been recently recorded in the Río Blanco Forest Reserve, and its range overlaps with the Selva de Florencia National Natural Park.
