= Pristimantis scoloblepharus =

Conservation status
- Endangered (IUCN 3.1)

Scientific classification
- Kingdom: Animalia
- Phylum: Chordata
- Class: Amphibia
- Order: Anura
- Family: Strabomantidae
- Genus: Pristimantis
- Subgenus: Pristimantis
- Species: P. scoloblepharus

Binomial name
- Pristimantis scoloblepharus (Lynch, 1991)

Synonyms
- Eleutherodactylus scoloblepharus Lynch, 1991

Species of frog

Pristimantis scoloblepharus is a species of frog in the family Strabomantidae. It is endemic to Colombia and is only known from three localities in the Cordillera Central in the Antioquia Department. The specific name scoloblepharus is derived from Greek skolos (=pointed) and blepharis (=eyelash) and refers to the large tubercle in its eyelid. Common name Los Patos robber frog has been coined for it.

== Description ==
Adult males in the type series measure 17–20 mm (0.67–0.79 in) and adult females, based on a single specimen only, 24 mm (0.94 in) in snout–vent length. The head is wider than the body in males and equally wide in the female. The snout is subacuminate in dorsal view and has a pointed tip, and is rounded in lateral view. The upper eyelid has a subconical or conical tubercle. The canthus rostralis is sharp. The supra-tympanic fold obscures the upper edge of the tympanum. The fingers bear fleshy lateral keels and rounded discs. The toes have fringes and bear discs that are smaller than those on the fingers. The dorsum is shagreened and has dorsolateral folds bearing conical tubercles. The dorsal coloration is light to dark brown and has weak brown markings; the flanks are lighter. The venter is grey and has brown mottling or reticulations.

== Habitat and conservation ==
Pristimantis scoloblepharus is found in primary or slightly disturbed forests at elevations between 2,620–3,800 m (8,600–12,470 ft) or 2,420–3,043 m (7,940–9,984 ft) above sea level. It occurs in dense vegetation along streams. It is nocturnal; individuals have been found in low vegetation, or hiding under stones during the day time.

Pristimantis scoloblepharus is an uncommon species. It is threatened by habitat loss (deforestation) caused by logging, agriculture, and mining. It is not known to occur in any protected areas.
