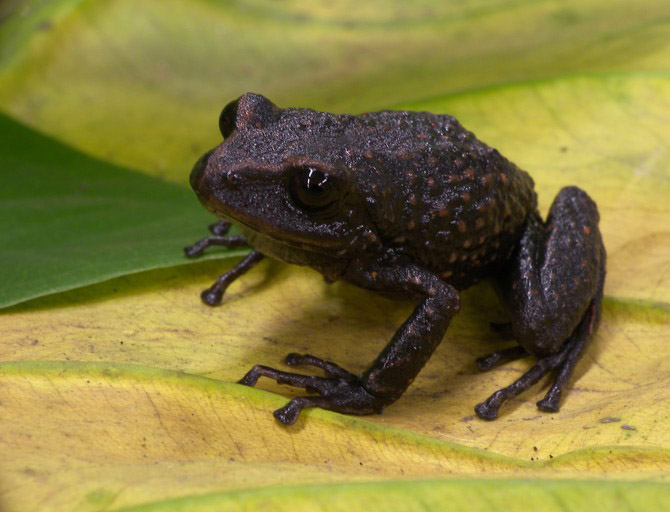

Conservation status
- Endangered (IUCN 3.1)

Scientific classification
- Kingdom: Animalia
- Phylum: Chordata
- Class: Amphibia
- Order: Anura
- Clade: Brachycephaloidea
- Family: Craugastoridae
- Genus: Pristimantis
- Species: P. parectatus

Binomial name
- Pristimantis parectatus (Lynch & Rueda-Almonacid, 1998)

Synonyms
- Eleutherodactylus parectatus Lynch & Rueda-Almonacid, 1998

= Pristimantis parectatus =

Species of frog

Pristimantis parectatus is a species of frog in the family Strabomantidae. It is endemic to Colombia where it is found on the eastern flank of the Cordillera Central in the Antioquia and Caldas Departments. Its natural habitats are high-altitude (1,800–2,850 m (5,910–9,350 ft) asl) Andean cloud forests. It is threatened by habitat loss caused by agricultural development.
