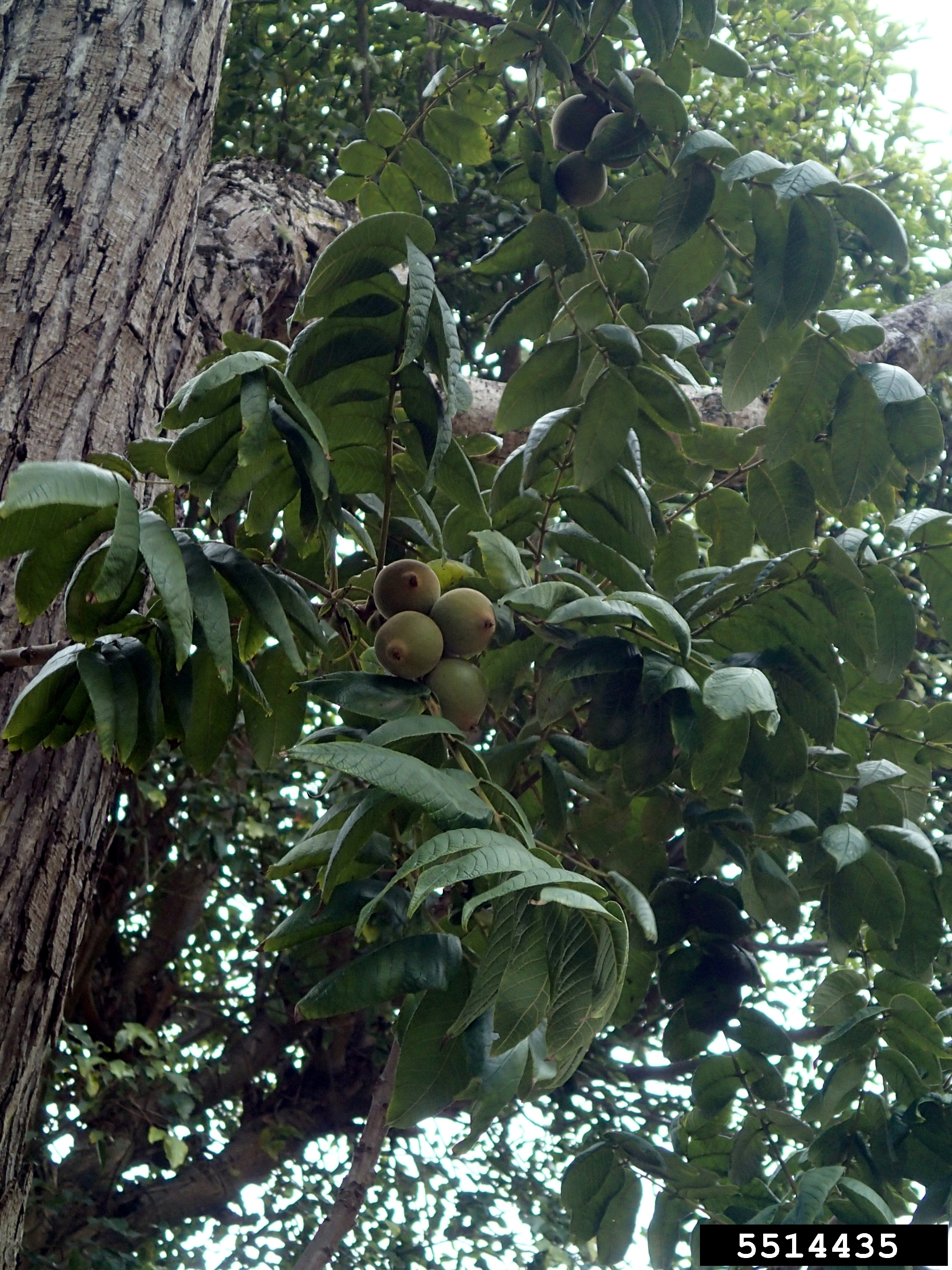
- Leaves and fruits

Conservation status
- Endangered (IUCN 2.3)

Scientific classification
- Kingdom: Plantae
- Clade: Embryophytes
- Clade: Tracheophytes
- Clade: Angiosperms
- Clade: Eudicots
- Clade: Rosids
- Order: Fagales
- Family: Juglandaceae
- Genus: Juglans
- Section: Juglans sect. Rhysocaryon
- Species: J. neotropica

Binomial name
- Juglans neotropica Diels

Synonyms
- Juglans columbiensis Dode; Juglans equatoriensis Linden; Juglans granatensis Linden; Juglans honorei Dode

= Juglans neotropica =

Species of plant

Juglans neotropica is a species of flowering plant in the Juglandaceae family. It is a tree native Colombia, Ecuador, Peru, and northern and northwestern Venezuela. It is threatened by habitat loss. Common names include Colombian walnut, Ecuadorian walnut, Andean walnut, nogal, cedro negro, cedro nogal, and nogal Bogotano.

== Growth and cultivation ==
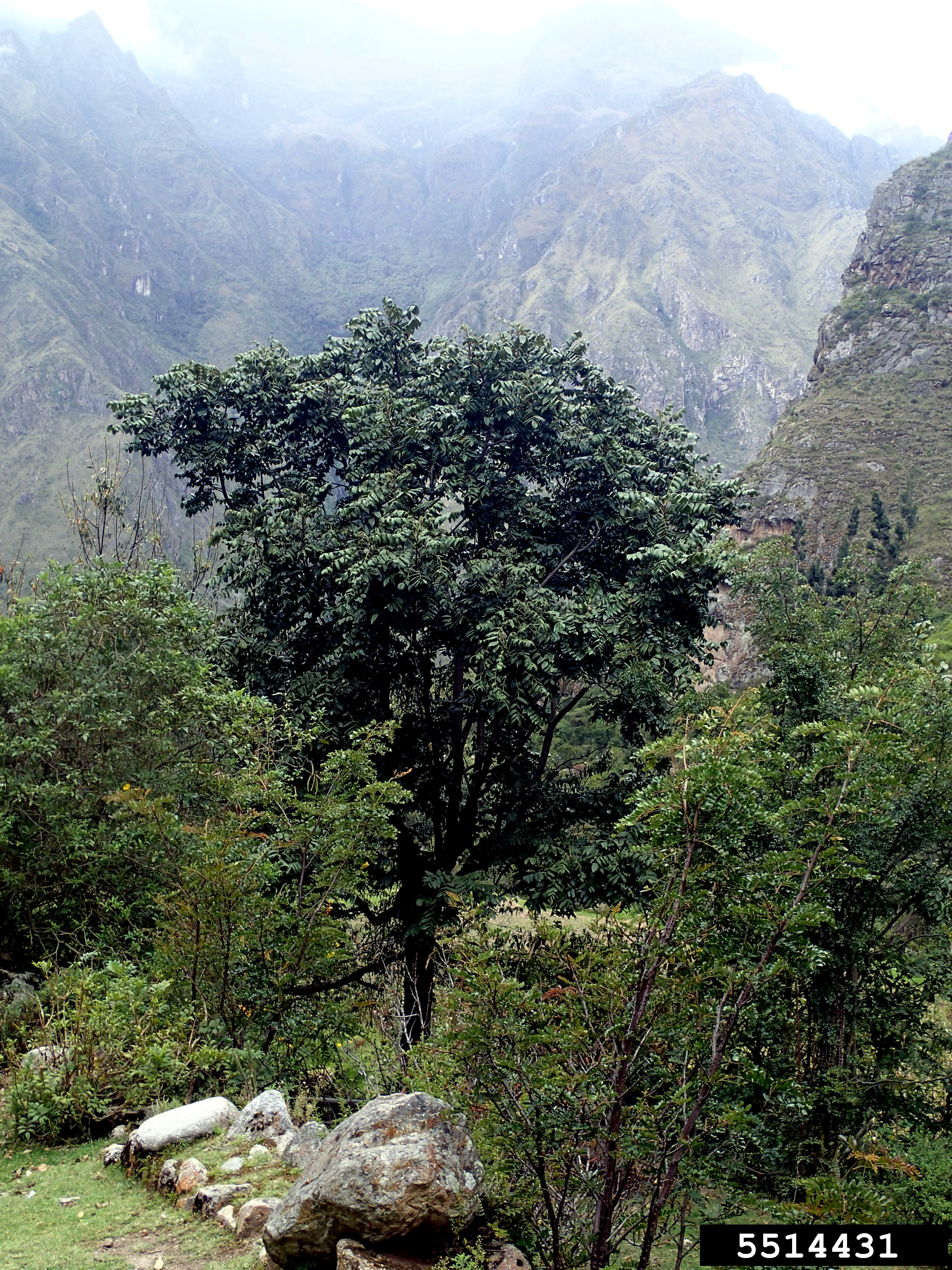
Juglans neotropica tree

It is a slow-growing tree attaining heights of up to 40 meters (130 ft), with grooved, red-brown bark and an oval-shaped canopy. The compound leaves, typical to all members of Juglans, are about 40 cm (16 in) long, grouped at the ends of the branches, and have a serrated border.

The species prefers loose-textured, fertile soils, and seems to thrive in somewhat muddy conditions. Neutral to slightly acidic soils are ideal; the tree will not tolerate calcaerous soils nor very acidic conditions. Andean Walnuts are found between 1,600 and 2,500 meters (5,200 and 8,200 ft) of elevation, in biomes where the average temperature is between 16 and 22 °C (61 and 72 °F), and annual precipitation of between 1 and 3 meters (39 and 118 in) that is distributed evenly throughout the year. The species does particularly well when planted near running water. It is found naturally in a wide variety of Pre-Montane and Montane forests, and most abundantly in cloud forests.

Propagation is by seed; nuts are scarified with sandpaper, then planted in moist sand for 4 months at a temperature of 2 to 4 °C (36 to 39 °F). Natural germination times are poorly studied, but new trees appear to grow where the nuts fall and are buried under leaf litter.

The Andean walnut is allelopathic, like most walnuts, and its presence will kill some understory plants. It is a common host for Anthuriums and Philodendrons, which appear to be unaffected.

== Fruit ==
Edible fruit is produced in husks that are yellow-green when ripe; collection is either by picking fallen fruits from the ground, or otherwise harvesting from the canopy when the husks show signs of being ripe. The sap of the fruit husk is a strong dye and can stain hands and clothing. The nut inside is within a much harder and more difficult to crack shell than Persian walnuts, but the meat inside is comparable in flavour, perhaps a bit sweeter. "Tocte", the fruit of the Andean walnut, are often sold in the farmer's markets of Ecuador. The process of husk removal often stains the shells of the nuts black.

Like all walnuts, unripe fruit husks produce a strong yellow dye that does not require mordant; ripe fruits produce a strong red to brown dye that does not require a mordant, and if cooked in an iron pot, a strong deep black dye.

Fruits must be soaked in water for 24–48 hours, but not allowed to ferment, after which the loosened pulp can be manually removed to reveal the walnut inside. There may be as few as 20 or as many as 200 nuts in a kilogram. Optimum storage temperature is 4–6 °C (39–43 °F).

== Wood ==
The hard, durable wood of Andean walnut is used in cabinetry, veneers, utensils, and other forms of decoration.
