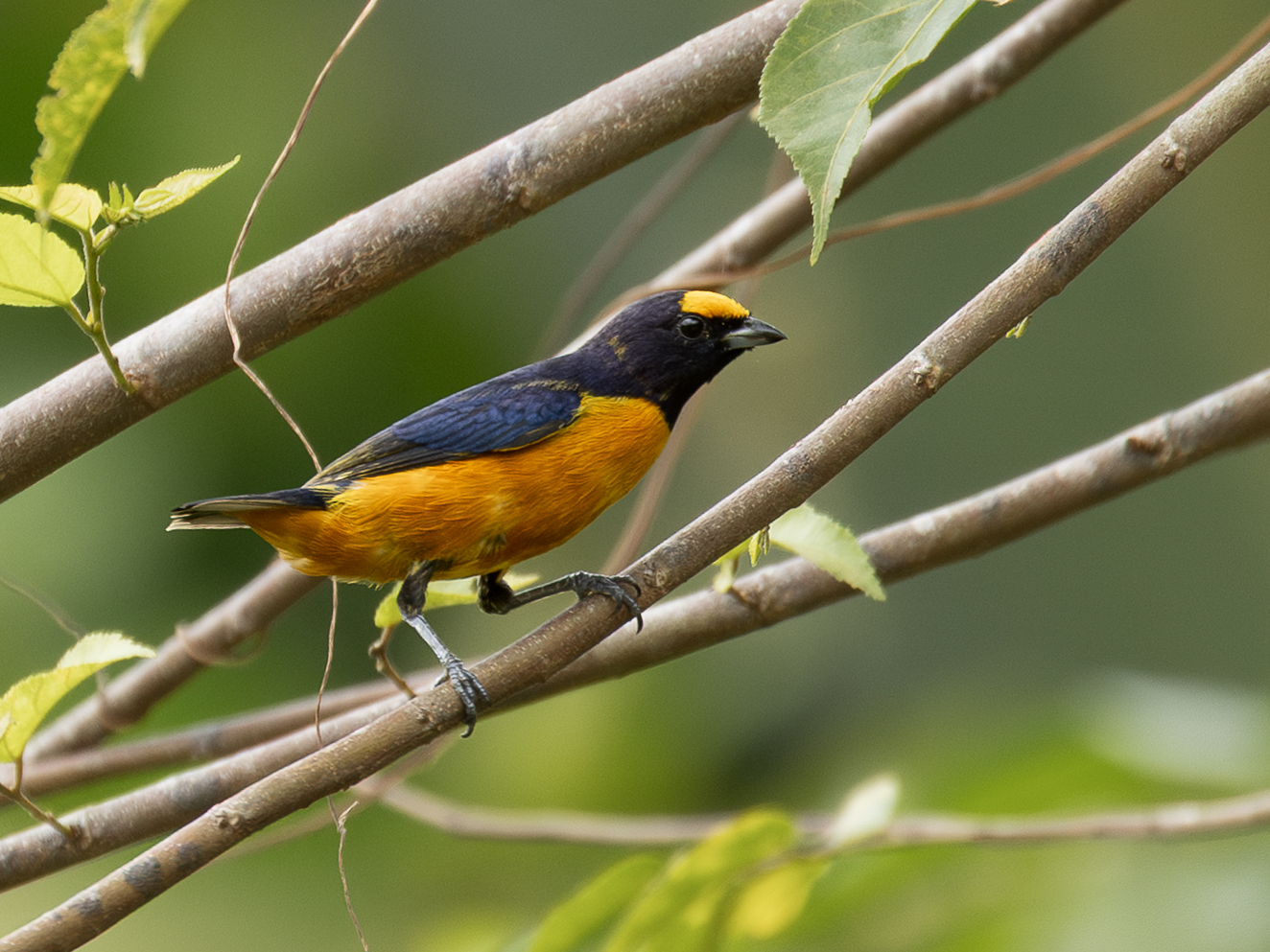
- Male at Mucajaí, Roraima, Brazil

Conservation status
- Least Concern (IUCN 3.1)

Scientific classification
- Kingdom: Animalia
- Phylum: Chordata
- Class: Aves
- Order: Passeriformes
- Family: Fringillidae
- Subfamily: Euphoniinae
- Genus: Euphonia
- Species: E. finschi

Binomial name
- Euphonia finschi P.L. Sclater & Salvin, 1877

= Finsch's euphonia =

Species of bird

Finsch's euphonia (Euphonia finschi) is a species of bird in the family Fringillidae, the finches and euphonias. It is found in Brazil, French Guiana, Guyana, Suriname and Venezuela.

== Taxonomy and systematics ==
Finsch's euphonia was originally described in 1877 with its current binomial Euphonia finschi. The genus Euphonia was long placed in the family Thraupidae, the "true" tanagers. Multiple studies in the late twentieth and early twenty-first centuries resulted in its being reassigned to its present place in the family Fringillidae.

The species' common name and specific epithet commemorate the German ethnographer, naturalist and colonial explorer Friedrich Hermann Otto Finsch (8 August 1839 - 31 January 1917, Braunschweig).

Finsch's euphonia is monotypic.

== Description ==
Finsch's euphonia is 9 to 10 cm (3.5 to 3.9 in) long and weighs 10 to 11 g (0.35 to 0.39 oz). The species is sexually dimorphic. Adult males have a dark yellow forehead and forecrown; the color extends to the rear of the eye. The rest of their head and their upperparts are glossy purplish-black. Their flight feathers are purplish black with white bases on the inner web. The upper side of their tail is dark steel-blue and the underside slate-gray. Their chin and throat are glossy purplish-black and the rest of their underparts are deep tawny orange with a burnt orange tinge on the lower breast and sides. Adult females have a mostly olive head with a faint yellowish forecrown and a faint dusky line through the eye. Their upperparts, wings, and tail are olive. Their throat and underparts are mostly olive-yellow with a dull yellow central belly. Both sexes have a brown iris, a blue-gray bill with a blackish tip, and dark gray legs and feet.

== Distribution and habitat ==
Finsch's euphonia is found primarily across most of Guyana, most of Suriname, and in northern French Guiana. Its range extends very slightly west into extreme southeastern Venezuela, where it is known from a specimen and a few sight records. It also occurs very slightly into far northern Brazil's Roraima state with isolated records further south and east in the country. It inhabits somewhat open landscapes, many of which are on sandy soil. These include gallery forest, savanna with brush and scattered trees, and the edges of humid forest. It is found between 900 and 1,200 m (3,000 and 3,900 ft) in Venezuela and up to 1,200 m (3,900 ft) in Brazil. In Guyana it is assumed to be at elevations similar to those in Venezuela but in Suriname and French Guiana it reaches only 400 m (1,300 ft).

== Behavior ==
=== Movement ===
Finsch's euphonia is generally resident species, though it probably does some short-distance wandering.

=== Feeding ===
Finsch's euphonia feeds primarily on the fruits of mistletoe (Loranthaceae) and other small fruits, and also includes small numbers of insects in its diet. It forages mostly in pairs or apparent family groups. It usually forages high in trees. It will share fruiting trees and shrubs with other euphonias.

=== Breeding ===
The breeding season of Finsch's euphonia includes April but is otherwise not defined. Nothing else is known about the species' breeding biology.

=== Vocalization ===
The call of Finsch's euphonia is "a clear, whistled dee-dee, this varied to dee-dee-dee, or even to 4 notes". It also makes "a clear beeee".

== Status ==
The IUCN has assessed Finsch's euphonia as being of Least Concern. Its population size is not known but is believed to be stable. No immediate threats have been identified. It "has been reported as used in trade at a low prevalence". Finsch's euphonia is considered "uncommon and perhaps also very local throughout its range; [it] can be difficult to find and seems nowhere very numerous". It occurs in a few protected sites.
