= Alopoglossus danieli =

Conservation status
- Critically Endangered (IUCN 3.1)

Scientific classification
- Kingdom: Animalia
- Phylum: Chordata
- Class: Reptilia
- Order: Squamata
- Family: Alopoglossidae
- Genus: Alopoglossus
- Species: A. danieli

Binomial name
- Alopoglossus danieli (Harris, 1994)

Synonyms
- Ptychoglossus danieli Harris, 1994; Alopoglossus danieli — Hernández-Morales et al., 2020

Species of lizard

Alopoglossus danieli, also known commonly as Daniel's largescale lizard, is a species of lizard in the family Alopoglossidae. The species is endemic to Colombia.

== Etymology ==
The specific name, danieli, is in honor of Colombian monk Brother Daniel Gonzalez Patiño (1909–1988), who was Director of the Museo de Historia Natural, Instituto de La Salle in Bogotá.

== Habitat ==
The preferred natural habitat of A. danieli is forest, at altitudes of 1,500–2,000 m (4,900–6,600 ft).

== Reproduction ==
A. danieli is oviparous.
