= Riama columbiana =

Conservation status
- Endangered (IUCN 3.1)

Scientific classification
- Kingdom: Animalia
- Phylum: Chordata
- Class: Reptilia
- Order: Squamata
- Family: Gymnophthalmidae
- Genus: Riama
- Species: R. columbiana

Binomial name
- Riama columbiana (Andersson, 1914)

Species of lizard

Riama columbiana, the Colombian lightbulb lizard, is a species of lizard in the family Gymnophthalmidae. It is endemic to Colombia.
