= Hemiphractus johnsoni =

Conservation status
- Endangered (IUCN 3.1)

Scientific classification
- Kingdom: Animalia
- Phylum: Chordata
- Class: Amphibia
- Order: Anura
- Family: Hemiphractidae
- Genus: Hemiphractus
- Species: H. johnsoni

Binomial name
- Hemiphractus johnsoni (Noble, 1917)

Synonyms
- Cerathyla johnsoni Noble, 1917

Species of frog

Hemiphractus johnsoni, or the Johnson's horned treefrog, is a species of frog in the family Hemiphractidae. It is endemic to Colombia and known from the Cordillera Central in Antioquia and Caldas Departments as well as from the Cordillera Oriental in Huila Department. Prior to 2001, what now is known as Hemiphractus helioi was included in this species.

== Habitat ==
Its natural habitat is primary cloud forest, where it has been found on the leaf litter. Scientists have seen the frog between 1,350 and 2,000 m (4,430 and 6,560 ft) above sea level.

Scientists have seen the frog in a protected place: Parque Natural Selva de Florencia.

== Food ==
This frog eats other frogs and only occurs in areas of high frog density.

== Young ==
The female frog carries her eggs on her back. The eggs hatch into small froglets with no free-swimming tadpole stage.

== Danger ==
The IUCN classifies this species as endangered. The principal threat is habitat loss associated with agriculture and livestock cultivation.
