= Hyloxalus bocagei =

Conservation status
- Least Concern (IUCN 3.1)

Scientific classification
- Kingdom: Animalia
- Phylum: Chordata
- Class: Amphibia
- Order: Anura
- Family: Dendrobatidae
- Genus: Hyloxalus
- Species: H. bocagei

Binomial name
- Hyloxalus bocagei Jiménez de la Espada, 1870

Synonyms
- Colostethus bocagei (Jiménez de la Espada, 1870)

Species of frog

Hyloxalus bocagei is a species of frog in the family Dendrobatidae. It is found on the northeastern side of the Andes in Ecuador (Sucumbíos, Orellana, and Napo Provinces) and in Colombia (Cordillera Oriental in the Caquetá Department). The specific name bocagei honors José Vicente Barbosa du Bocage, a Portuguese zoologist. Common name Bocage's rocket frog has been coined for this species.

== Taxonomy ==
Hyloxalus bocagei belongs to a group of species that are difficult to identify, and the taxonomic history of the group is complex. Hyloxalus maculosus has been considered a junior synonym of Hyloxalus bocagei, but is now recognized as a species. Hyloxalus italoi and Hyloxalus yasuni were described as new species in 2010.

== Description ==
Males measure 20–25 mm (0.79–0.98 in) and females 24–30 mm (0.94–1.18 in) in snout–vent length. Dorsum is olive-brown with dark brown dorsal blotches and flanks with a dark brown stripe. There are oblique lateral stripes extending from anterior corner of the eye to the groin, with cream and golden traces, olive-tan anteriorly. Two small golden glands are at each side of the eye. Iris is golden with small black flecks. Tympanum is cream-coloured. Ventral surfaces are uniformly gray. Skin of dorsum, limbs, flanks and venter smooth, but some specimens have scattered tubercles posterior to the sacral region and on flanks.

Tadpoles have a ventrally located oral disc. They have brown, golden glittered dorsum and pinkish tail with brown and golden spots in the dorsoanterior portion. Ventrally they are translucent, with two very conspicuous silver marks at anterior portion. There is also a golden mark on dorsal fin, just behind its base. The total length ranges between 11.8 and 34 mm (0.46 and 1.34 in) (Gosner stages 25–36). Tail is about two thirds of the total length. Recently metamorphosed juvenile frogs measure 9.6–12.5 mm (0.38–0.49 in) in snout–vent length.

== Reproduction ==
Call of male Hyloxalus bocagei is a long trill consisting of paired notes. Calling males have been observed in late morning. Eggs are deposited amidst leaf litter on the forest floor, and the male attends the eggs. Upon hatching, the tadpoles climb onto the back of the male, who transports them to water.

== Habitat and conservation ==
Natural habitats of Hyloxalus bocagei are montane forest near streams at elevations of 427–1,750 m (1,401–5,741 ft) asl. They are active by day. Tadpoles develop in streams. Hyloxalus bocagei is threatened by habitat loss. Its range overlaps with the Sumaco Napo-Galeras National Park, Reserva Ecológica Cayambe-Coca, and Reserva Natural Comunitaria El Manantial Florencia.
