= Colostethus agilis =

Conservation status
- Endangered (IUCN 3.1)

Scientific classification
- Kingdom: Animalia
- Phylum: Chordata
- Class: Amphibia
- Order: Anura
- Family: Dendrobatidae
- Genus: Colostethus
- Species: C. agilis

Binomial name
- Colostethus agilis Lynch & Ruíz-Carranza, 1985

Species of frog

Colostethus agilis is a species of frog in the family Dendrobatidae. It is endemic to Colombia. Its natural habitats are subtropical or tropical moist montane forests and rivers.

== Description ==
Colostethus agilis grows to a snout-to-vent length of about 25 mm (1 in) with females being slightly larger than males at 28 mm (1 in). The head is wide and the snout short. The tympanum, situated just behind the eye, is half covered by a fold of skin. There are some white specks on the upper lip and the iris is bronze with yellow specks. The dorsal and lateral surfaces have several longitudinal rows of warts and the general colour is olive or deep brown with darker coloured blotches. The ventral surface and the underside of the thighs are pale with yellowish blotches. There are discs on the tips of the fingers of the fore feet and smaller ones on the hind feet. Colostethus agilis is one of only five species of Colostethus that have fully webbed hind feet, the others being Colostethus chocoensis, Colostethus fuliginosus, Colostethus palmatus and Colostethus vergeli.

== Distribution ==
Colostethus agilis is endemic to Colombia, where it is found in the western parts of the Cordillera Occidental at heights between 2,190 and 2,600 metres (7,190 and 8,530 ft) above sea level. Its range extends from La Serrania de los Paraguas southwards to the Munchique National Natural Park, and it inhabits the floors of moist forests and the streams that flow through them. Scientists believe its range may include one other protected park: Parque Nacional Natural Farallones de Cali.

== Status ==
The IUCN Red List of Threatened Species includes Colostethus agilis as endangered. Its range probably extends to less than 5,000 square kilometres (1,900 sq mi) and its numbers may be declining gradually, but it has shown some resilience and occurs in both old-growth forests and secondary forests. The main threats it faces are forestry activities, the conversion of woodland to agricultural uses (including illegal crops) and pollution of the streams in which it is believed to breed, the conversion of woodland to cattle grazing area, and mining operations.
