= Hyloxalus parcus =

Conservation status
- Data Deficient (IUCN 3.1)

Scientific classification
- Kingdom: Animalia
- Phylum: Chordata
- Class: Amphibia
- Order: Anura
- Family: Dendrobatidae
- Genus: Hyloxalus
- Species: H. parcus

Binomial name
- Hyloxalus parcus (Rivero, 1991)

Synonyms
- Colostethus parcus Rivero, 1991

Species of amphibian

Hyloxalus parcus (Gualaceo rocket frog) is a species of frogs in the family Dendrobatidae. It is endemic to Ecuador where it was first known from its type locality in the Zamora-Santiago Province at an elevation of 1,981 m (6,499 ft) asl. It has since been found between 1707 and 2073 meters above sea level.

Hyloxalus parcus has been considered a synonym of Hyloxalus exasperatus, but it is now treated as a valid species. Very little is known about it. Scientists infer that it breeds through larval development, like its congeners. The International Union for Conservation of Nature classifies Hyloxalus parcus as Data Deficient. Its known range overlaps with one protected park: Área Ecológica de Conservacíon Siete Iglesias.
