= Hyloxalus betancuri =

Conservation status
- Data Deficient (IUCN 3.1)

Scientific classification
- Kingdom: Animalia
- Phylum: Chordata
- Class: Amphibia
- Order: Anura
- Family: Dendrobatidae
- Genus: Hyloxalus
- Species: H. betancuri

Binomial name
- Hyloxalus betancuri (Rivero & Serna, 1991)

Synonyms
- Colostethus betancuri Rivero and Serna, 1991

Species of amphibian

Hyloxalus betancuri is a species of frogs in the family Dendrobatidae. It is endemic to Colombia where it is only known from its type locality in Ituango, Antioquia Department, on the Cordillera Occidental at 1,450 m (4,760 ft) asl. Its natural habitats are sub-Andean forests where it can be found on the ground next to streams. There are no known threats to this species, and the type locality is within the Parque Nacional Natural Paramillo.
