= Hyloxalus breviquartus =

Conservation status
- Least Concern (IUCN 3.1)

Scientific classification
- Kingdom: Animalia
- Phylum: Chordata
- Class: Amphibia
- Order: Anura
- Family: Dendrobatidae
- Genus: Hyloxalus
- Species: H. breviquartus

Binomial name
- Hyloxalus breviquartus (Rivero & Serna, 1986)

Synonyms
- Colostethus breviquartus Rivero & Serna, 1986

Species of amphibian

Hyloxalus breviquartus is a species of frog in the family Dendrobatidae. It is found in the northern part of Cordillera Occidental in Antioquia, Colombia, and in Carchi Province in northwestern Ecuador. Colombian distribution may be wider. Its natural habitats are montane forests next to streams and very humid premontane forests. It is threatened by habitat loss, although it occurs in the Las Orquídeas National Natural Park, its type locality.

== Description ==
Females measure 15–17 mm (0.59–0.67 in) in snout–vent length. The skin of the dorsum is coffee-gray in color. There is a line down the side of the body starting at the eye. The adult female frog's belly is white in color.

== Etymology ==
Scientists gave this frog the Latin name breviquartus. Brevi is "short" and quartus is "fourth." This refers to the fact that the fourth toe on the front foot is significantly shorter than the second toe.

== Habitat ==
This terrestrial frog has been observed in montane forests. In Ecuador, this frog has only been found in forests with between 2000 and 4000 mm of annual. This frog has been observed between 600 and 900 meters above sea level in Ecuador and between 1700 and 2265 meters above sea level in Colombia.

The frog's range includes at least one protected park: Parque Nacional de Las Orquídeas.

== Reproduction ==
Scientists infer that this frog breeds through larval development in streams.

== Threats ==
The IUCN classifies this frog as least concern of extinction. What threat it faces comes from deforestation associated with logging and illegal agriculture, including pollution from chemicals sprayed on illegal crops. Invasive predatory fish can also harm this population. Scientists cite the fungal disease chytridiomycosis as a possible future threat.
