= Hyloxalus marmoreoventris =

Conservation status
- Critically endangered, possibly extinct (IUCN 3.1)

Scientific classification
- Kingdom: Animalia
- Phylum: Chordata
- Class: Amphibia
- Order: Anura
- Family: Dendrobatidae
- Genus: Hyloxalus
- Species: H. marmoreoventris

Binomial name
- Hyloxalus marmoreoventris (Rivero, 1991)

Synonyms
- Colostethus marmoreoventris Rivero, 1991

Species of amphibian

Hyloxalus marmoreoventris is a species of frogs in the family Dendrobatidae. It is endemic to Ecuador and only known from its type locality on the eastern slope of the Andes in the Tungurahua Province. It is a little known species which possibly has not been observed after the holotype was collected in 1962.

== Description ==
The holotype, a male, measures 22 mm (0.87 in) in snout–vent length and has a spotted venter (which distinguishes it from the similar Hyloxalus fallax). Females are unknown.

== Habitat and conservation ==
Hyloxalus marmoreoventris inhabits premontane forest at 1,225 m (4,019 ft) asl. It is threatened by habitat loss. The forest at the type locality has already been cleared, although forests remain in the vicinity and within protected areas (Llanganates and Sangay National Parks).
