= Hyloxalus excisus =

Conservation status
- Data Deficient (IUCN 3.1)

Scientific classification
- Kingdom: Animalia
- Phylum: Chordata
- Class: Amphibia
- Order: Anura
- Family: Dendrobatidae
- Genus: Hyloxalus
- Species: H. excisus

Binomial name
- Hyloxalus excisus (Rivero & Serna, 2000)

Synonyms
- Colostethus excisus Rivero and Serna, 2000

Species of frog

Hyloxalus excisus is a species of frog in the family Dendrobatidae. It is endemic to Colombia. It is only known from its type locality near Medellín, Antioquia Department, on the Cordillera Central, 2200 meters above sea level.

Its natural habitats are Andean forests. Its ecology is essentially unknown.
