= Hyloxalus borjai =

Conservation status
- Data Deficient (IUCN 3.1)

Scientific classification
- Kingdom: Animalia
- Phylum: Chordata
- Class: Amphibia
- Order: Anura
- Family: Dendrobatidae
- Genus: Hyloxalus
- Species: H. borjai

Binomial name
- Hyloxalus borjai (Rivero and Serna, 2000)

Synonyms
- Colostethus borjai Rivero and Serna, 2000 "1995"

Species of frog

Hyloxalus borjai is a species of frog in the family Dendrobatidae. It is endemic to Colombia and only known from its type locality, Amalfi, Antioquia, on the Cordillera Central at 1,575 m (5,167 ft) asl. Its natural habitats are sub-Andean forests. Very little is known about this species.
