= Hyloxalus craspedoceps =

Conservation status
- Data Deficient (IUCN 3.1)

Scientific classification
- Kingdom: Animalia
- Phylum: Chordata
- Class: Amphibia
- Order: Anura
- Family: Dendrobatidae
- Genus: Hyloxalus
- Species: H. craspedoceps

Binomial name
- Hyloxalus craspedoceps (Duellman, 2004)

Synonyms
- Colostethus craspedoceps Duellman, 2004; Allobates craspedoceps Grant, Frost, Caldwell, Gagliardo, Haddad, Kok, Means, Noonan, Schargel, and Wheeler, 2006; Holoxalus craspedoceps Santos, Coloma, Summers, Caldwell, Ree, and Cannatella, 2009

Species of frog

Hyloxalus craspedoceps is a species of frog in the family Dendrobatidae. It lives in Peru.

== Description ==
The adult male frog measures as much as 19.1 mm in snout-vent length and the adult female frog 20.5 mm. This frog has disks on the toes of all four feet. The skin of the dorsum is brown in color. The flanks are creamy tan in color with brown spots. The sides of the head are brown and yellow in color. The upper surfaces of the forelegs are yellow in color. The belly is yellow-white in color with some green tinting. The ventral surfaces of the legs are yellow in color. The adult male frog's chest and throat are brown in color. The male frog's testes are white in color. The iris of the eye is copper-brown in color with a dark brown streak.

== Habitat ==
Scientists know this frog from its type locality, 500 meters above sea level in the Cordillera Central. It was found in cutover lowland rainforest.

== Reproduction ==
Scientists infer the female frog lays her eggs on the ground. After the eggs hatch, the adult frogs carry the tadpoles to water. Scientists observed one male frog with seven tadpoles on his back. Scientists also observed tadpoles swimming in a rocky stream.

The tadpoles are dark brown in color with cream-white bellies.

== Threats ==
The IUCN classifies this frog as data deficient. Because it was observed in cutover rainforest, they believe it may have some ability to survice in disturbed habitats.

== Original description ==
- Duellman, W. E. (2004). "Frogs of the Genus Colostethus (Anura; Dendrobatidae) in the Andes of Northern Peru". Scientific Papers Natural History Museum University of Kansas. 35: 1–49.
