= Hyloxalus idiomelus =

Conservation status
- Data Deficient (IUCN 3.1)

Scientific classification
- Kingdom: Animalia
- Phylum: Chordata
- Class: Amphibia
- Order: Anura
- Family: Dendrobatidae
- Genus: Hyloxalus
- Species: H. idiomelus

Binomial name
- Hyloxalus idiomelus (Rivero, 1991)

Synonyms
- Colostethus idiomelus Rivero, 1991; Colostethus idiomelas (typo)

Species of amphibian

Hyloxalus idiomelus (Rivero's rocket frog) is a species of frogs in the family Dendrobatidae. It is endemic to the northern part of the Cordillera Central of northern Peru.<

== Description ==
Males measure 20–25 mm (0.79–0.98 in) and females 23–28 mm (0.91–1.10 in) in snout–vent length. The body is robust. Skin on dorsum is smooth to shagreen. Dorsum is dull tan to rich orange-brown to grayish tan in colour, with green tint in some places. Dorsolateral stripe is pinkish tan, yellowish orange, or cream coloured. The labial stripe is pinkish tan in colour. Some surfaces of the hind legs are yellow or orange in color. The undersides of the limbs are yellow in colour. The iris of the eye is bronze in colour. There is no webbed skin on the hind feet.

Free-swimming tadpoles are up to 43 mm (1.7 in) in total length, whereas tadpoles transported on the back of their father measure 10–12 mm (0.39–0.47 in).

== Habitat and reproduction ==
Its natural habitats are humid tropical montane forests between 1620 and 2840 meters above sea level, typically near seepages and along small streams. It has also been recorded from disturbed forest and cultivated land. This frog is diurnal. Tadpoles develop in slow-moving and sometimes marshy streams where they are carried on the back of their father.

== Conservation and threats ==
The IUCN classifies this frog as data deficient. Threats include habitat loss associated with agriculture, logging, and urbanization. The fungal disease chytridiomycosis has killed other amphibians in the area, so scientists infer that it may kill this frog as well.

Scientists have observed this frog in two protected parks: Alto Mayo Protection Forest and Tilacancha Private Conservation Area.
