= Hyloxalus mittermeieri =

Conservation status
- Data Deficient (IUCN 3.1)

Scientific classification
- Kingdom: Animalia
- Phylum: Chordata
- Class: Amphibia
- Order: Anura
- Family: Dendrobatidae
- Genus: Hyloxalus
- Species: H. mittermeieri

Binomial name
- Hyloxalus mittermeieri (Rivero, 1991)

Synonyms
- Colostethus mittermeieri Rivero, 1991

Species of amphibian

Hyloxalus mittermeieri is a species of frogs in the family Dendrobatidae. It is endemic to Peru and only known from the area of its type locality on the eastern slopes of the central Andes in the San Martín Region. Its natural habitats are tropical montane forests near streams. It is only known from two specimens, from 1,620 and 2,050 m (5,310 and 6,730 ft) asl on the road between Rioja and Balzapata.

== Description ==
Male measures about 27 mm (1.1 in) and female 28 mm (1.1 in) in snout–vent length. Body is moderately robust.
