= Hyloxalus aeruginosus =

Conservation status
- Data Deficient (IUCN 3.1)

Scientific classification
- Kingdom: Animalia
- Phylum: Chordata
- Class: Amphibia
- Order: Anura
- Family: Dendrobatidae
- Genus: Hyloxalus
- Species: H. aeruginosus

Binomial name
- Hyloxalus aeruginosus (Duellman, 2004)

Species of poison dart frog

Hyloxalus aeruginosus is a species of poison dart frog endemic to Peru.

== Description ==
This frog is moderately sized. The adult male frog can be as large as 25.0 mm in snout-vent length and the adult female frog 29.2 mm. The skin of the dorsum is a dark moss green. The iris is brown with the pupil surrounded by a cream ring. The throat, chest, and anterior part of belly are olive brown speckled with cream colored spots. The posterior belly is dark yellow. There are disks on the toes of all four feet and no webbed skin on the hind feet.

== Distribution ==
This species is endemic to the province of Rioja in Peru, where it can be found on the steep eastern slope of the Cordillera Central of the Andes. It has a very limited geographical range, having been observed at two sites, one 1980 m above sea level and the other 2180 m above sea level. There have been no recent surveys.

The two sites at which the frog has been observed are both within a protected park: Alto Moya Protection Forest.

== Habitat ==
It lives in small, rocky streams in montane cloud forests.

== Reproduction ==
Scientists infer that the female frog lays eggs on land, and, after the eggs hatch, the adult frogs take the tadpoles water. This is what other frogs in Hyloxalus do.

== Threats ==
The IUCN classifies this frog as data deficient. Its principal threats are not known. However, the fungal disease chytridiomycosis killed many other stream-breeding frogs in Peru in the 1980s and 1990s.

== Original description ==
- Duellman, W. E. (2004). "Frogs of the Genus Colostethus (Anura; Dendrobatidae) in the Andes of Northern Peru". Scientific Papers Natural History Museum University of Kansas. 35: 1–49.
