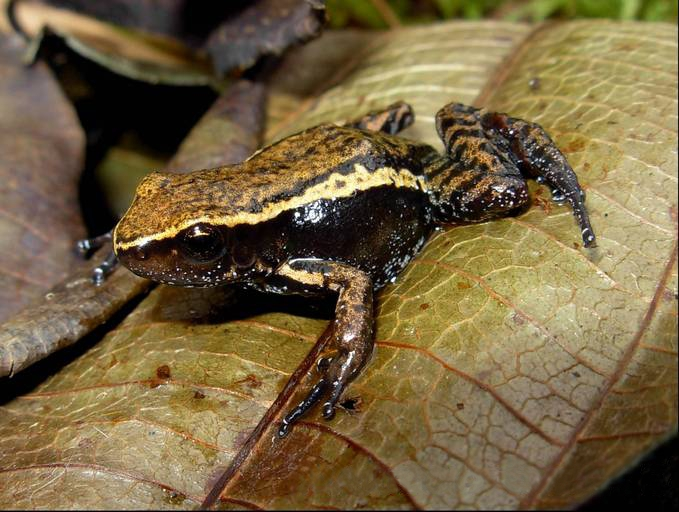
- Cream-backed poison frog (H. subpunctatus)

Scientific classification
- Domain: Eukaryota
- Kingdom: Animalia
- Phylum: Chordata
- Class: Amphibia
- Order: Anura
- Family: Dendrobatidae
- Subfamily: Hyloxalinae
- Genus: Hyloxalus; Jiménez de la Espada, 1870

Type species
- Hyloxalus fuliginosus Jiménez de la Espada, 1870

Species
- 63 species (see text)

Synonyms
- Phyllodromus Jiménez de la Espada, 1875; Hylixalus Boulenger, 1882; Cryptophyllobates Lötters, Jungfer, and Widmer, 2000

= Hyloxalus =

Genus of amphibians

Hyloxalus is a genus of poison dart frogs, family Dendrobatidae. The genus is distributed in Central and South America, from Panama south to Peru (along the Pacific coast), along with Venezuela, Colombia, and Ecuador. They also inhabit the eastern foothills of the Andes in Bolivia to Venezuela, east to the upper Amazon Basin.

== Description ==
Hyloxalus are small to moderate-size frogs, ranging from about 19 to 33 mm (0.7 to 1.3 in) in snout–vent length. Most species have cryptic, brown, gray, or black dorsal coloration, but some have conspicuous, bright colors (e.g., Hyloxalus azureiventris). A pale oblique lateral stripe is always present. Toe webbing is absent in most species but is present in some species and can even be extensive. Fingers bear narrow to moderately expanded discs.

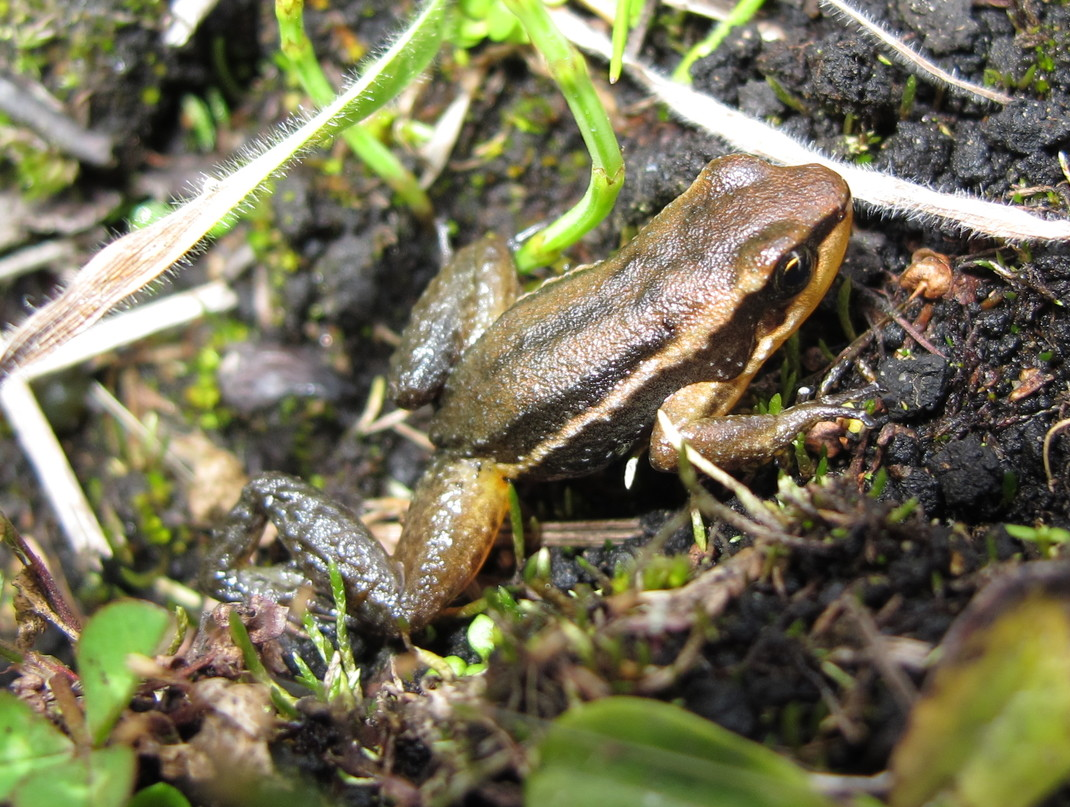
Hyloxalus anthracinus

== Reproduction ==
Most species deposits their eggs in terrestrial nests and transport the tadpoles to pools on the forest floor or in backwaters of streams. Hyloxalus chlorocraspedus uses pools formed in fallen trees.

== Species ==
As of early 2022, there are 63 recognized species:

- Hyloxalus abditaurantius (Silverstone, 1975)
- Hyloxalus aeruginosus (Duellman, 2004)
- Hyloxalus alessandroi (Grant and Rodriguez, 2001)
- Hyloxalus anthracinus (Edwards, 1971)
- Hyloxalus arliensis Acosta-Galvis, Vargas-Ramírez, Anganoy-Criollo, Ibarra, and Gonzáles, 2020
- Hyloxalus awa (Coloma, 1995)
- Hyloxalus azureiventris (Kneller and Henle, 1985)
- Hyloxalus betancuri (Rivero and Serna, 1991)
- Hyloxalus bocagei Jiménez de la Espada, 1870
- Hyloxalus borjai (Rivero and Serna, 2000)
- Hyloxalus breviquartus (Rivero and Serna, 1986)
- Hyloxalus cepedai (Morales, 2002)
- Hyloxalus cevallosi (Rivero, 1991)
- Hyloxalus chlorocraspedus (Caldwell, 2005)
- Hyloxalus chocoensis Boulenger, 1912
- Hyloxalus craspedoceps (Duellman, 2004)
- Hyloxalus delatorreae (Coloma, 1995)
- Hyloxalus edwardsi (Lynch, 1982)
- Hyloxalus elachyhistus (Edwards, 1971)
- Hyloxalus eleutherodactylus (Duellman, 2004)
- Hyloxalus exasperatus (Duellman and Lynch, 1988)
- Hyloxalus excisus (Rivero and Serna, 2000)
- Hyloxalus faciopunctulatus (Rivero, 1991)
- Hyloxalus fallax (Rivero, 1991)
- Hyloxalus fascianigrus (Grant and Castro-Herrera, 1998)
- Hyloxalus felixcoperari Acosta-Galvis and Vargas Ramírez, 2018
- Hyloxalus fuliginosus Jiménez de la Espada, 1870
- Hyloxalus idiomelus (Rivero, 1991)
- Hyloxalus infraguttatus (Boulenger, 1898)
- Hyloxalus insulatus (Duellman, 2004)
- Hyloxalus italoi Páez-Vacas, Coloma, and Santos, 2010
- Hyloxalus lehmanni (Silverstone, 1971)
- Hyloxalus leucophaeus (Duellman, 2004)
- Hyloxalus littoralis (Péfaur, 1984)
- Hyloxalus maculosus (Rivero, 1991)
- Hyloxalus maquipucuna (Coloma, 1995)
- Hyloxalus marmoreoventris (Rivero, 1991)
- Hyloxalus mittermeieri (Rivero, 1991)
- Hyloxalus mystax (Duellman and Simmons, 1988)
- Hyloxalus nexipus (Frost, 1986)
- Hyloxalus parcus (Rivero, 1991)
- Hyloxalus patitae (Lötters, Morales, and Proy, 2003)
- Hyloxalus peculiaris (Rivero, 1991)
- Hyloxalus picachos (Ardila-Robayo, Acosta-Galvis, and Coloma, 2000)
- Hyloxalus pinguis (Rivero and Granados-Díaz, 1990)
- Hyloxalus pulchellus (Jiménez de la Espada, 1875)
- Hyloxalus pulcherrimus (Duellman, 2004)
- Hyloxalus pumilus (Rivero, 1991)
- Hyloxalus ramosi (Silverstone, 1971)
- Hyloxalus ruizi (Lynch, 1982)
- Hyloxalus saltuarius (Grant and Ardila-Robayo, 2002)
- Hyloxalus sanctamariensis Acosta-Galvis and Pinzón, 2018
- Hyloxalus sauli (Edwards, 1974)
- Hyloxalus shuar (Duellman and Simmons, 1988)
- Hyloxalus sordidatus (Duellman, 2004)
- Hyloxalus spilotogaster (Duellman, 2004)
- Hyloxalus subpunctatus (Cope, 1899)
- Hyloxalus sylvaticus (Barbour and Noble, 1920)
- Hyloxalus toachi (Coloma, 1995)
- Hyloxalus utcubambensis (Morales, 1994)
- Hyloxalus vergeli Hellmich, 1940
- Hyloxalus vertebralis (Boulenger, 1899)
- Hyloxalus yasuni Páez-Vacas, Coloma, and Santos, 2010
