= Hyloxalus leucophaeus =

Conservation status
- Data Deficient (IUCN 3.1)

Scientific classification
- Kingdom: Animalia
- Phylum: Chordata
- Class: Amphibia
- Order: Anura
- Family: Dendrobatidae
- Genus: Hyloxalus
- Species: H. leucophaeus

Binomial name
- Hyloxalus leucophaeus Duellman, 2004

Synonyms
- Colostethus leucophaeus

Species of frog

Hyloxalus leucophaeus is a species of frog in the family Dendrobatidae. It is endemic to a very limited range in Peru.

== Description ==
It is moderately sized. The adult male frog measures about 25.2 mm in snout-vent length and the adult female frog 26.1 mm. This frog has climbing disks on the toes of all four feet. It has a mostly moss grey body with patches of white and a more orange shade of the body colour.

At stage 28, the tadpole is 15.6 mm long in body and 37.5 mm long including the tail. It has small eyes, which are located dorsolaterally such that they are not visible from below. The tadpole is dark gray in color.

== Distribution ==
This species is known only from a very small range Molinopampa district in the northern Cordillera Central in the Peruvian Andes where it has been found at a height of 2,400 m above sea level.

== Habitat ==
A marshy stream in a pasture of old farmland is the only place where this species was recorded.

== Behaviour ==
Scientists believe that this frog lays its eggs on land, like most related species. They observed the tadpoles swimming in streams.

== Threats ==
The IUCN classifies this frog as data deficient. As such, its risk of extinction is not known. The fungal disease chytridiomycosis has killed many other stream-breeding frogs in the area.
