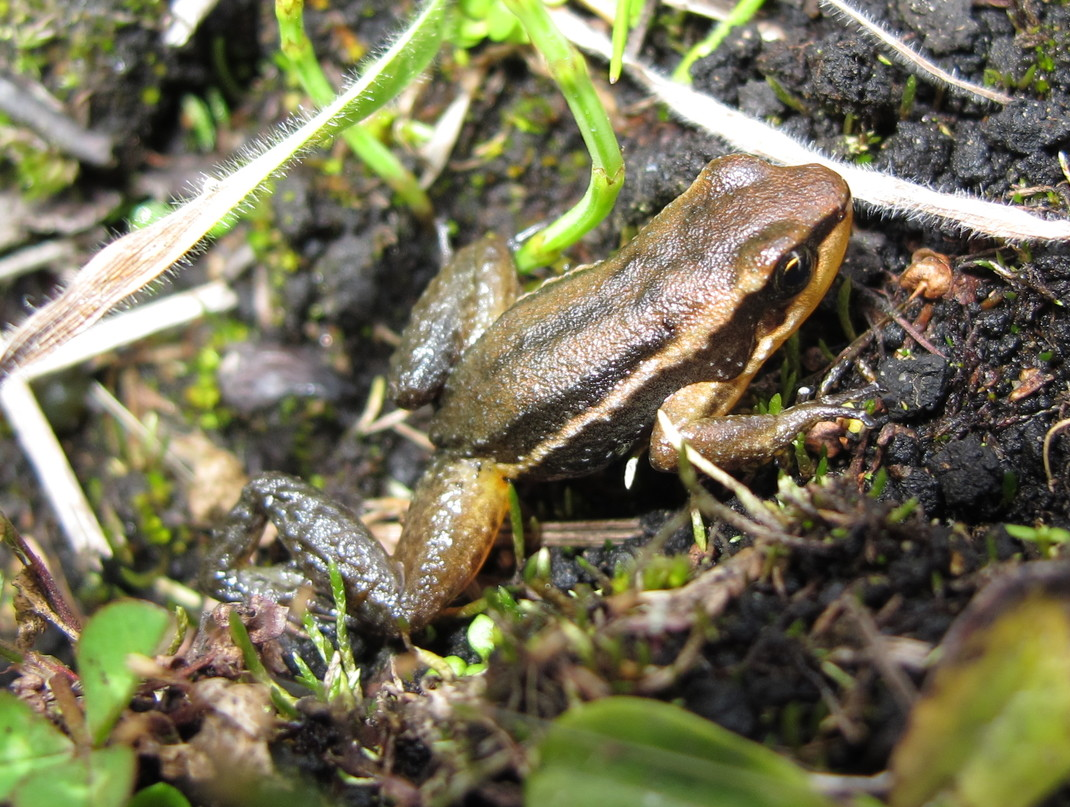
- Hyloxalus anthracinus in Azuay, Ecuador

Conservation status
- Critically Endangered (IUCN 3.1)

Scientific classification
- Kingdom: Animalia
- Phylum: Chordata
- Class: Amphibia
- Order: Anura
- Family: Dendrobatidae
- Genus: Hyloxalus
- Species: H. anthracinus

Binomial name
- Hyloxalus anthracinus (Edwards, 1971)

Synonyms
- Colostethus anthracinus Edwards, 1971

= Hyloxalus anthracinus =

Species of frog

Hyloxalus anthracinus is a species of frog in the family Dendrobatidae. It is endemic to Ecuador and occurs on the Cordillera Oriental and in the Mazán River, southern Ecuador.

== Description ==
The adult male frog measures 16.2–19.0 mm in snout-vent length and the adult female frog 17.1–23.6 mm. This frog has no webbed skin on any of its four feet. The skin of the dorsum is mottled with lighter marks. Some frogs also have black marks. There is a black line from the shoulder to the cloaca. Larger males have darker bellies than smaller males, and older females have more spots on their throats than younger females. Female frogs have white bellies. The male frog's testicles are white in color.

== Etymology ==
Scientists gave this frog the Latin name anthracinus for the coal-black color of its stripes.

== Young ==
Scientists think that the female frog lays eggs on the ground and that the adult male frogs carry the tadpoles to streams.

== Habitat ==
Its natural habitats are páramo, very humid montane forest, and lower humid montane forest. It appears to have declined dramatically, possibly due to chytridiomycosis. It is also threatened by habitat loss, which scientists attribute to agriculture, development, human transportation routes, and pyroclastic events.

The frog's range includes some protected parks, for example Parque Nacional Sangay, Parque Nacional Rio Negro Sopladora, Parque Nacional Cajas, and Siete Iglesias Municipal Ecological Conservation Area.
