= Hyloxalus maculosus =

Conservation status
- Endangered (IUCN 3.1)

Scientific classification
- Kingdom: Animalia
- Phylum: Chordata
- Class: Amphibia
- Order: Anura
- Family: Dendrobatidae
- Genus: Hyloxalus
- Species: H. maculosus

Binomial name
- Hyloxalus maculosus (Rivero, 1991)

Synonyms
- Colostethus maculosus Rivero, 1991

Species of amphibian

Hyloxalus maculosus, also known as spotted rocket frog, is a species of frogs in the family Dendrobatidae. It is endemic to the eastern slopes of Ecuadorian Andes in Napo and Pastaza provinces at elevations of 342 to 1,225 m (1,122 to 4,019 ft) asl.

== Taxonomy ==
Hyloxalus maculosus has been considered a synonym of Hyloxalus bocagei, but it is now treated as a valid species, though within the Hyloxalus bocagei species complex. In addition to morphological differences in both tadpoles and adults, male call parameters differ between Hyloxalus maculosus and Hyloxalus bocagei.

== Description ==
Males measure 20–25 mm (0.79–0.98 in) and females 22–29 mm (0.87–1.14 in) in snout–vent length. Dorsum is reddish-brown, more reddish posteriorly and in the hind limbs. There are brighter reddish-brown spots posterior to eyes and on arms at the arm-body junction. An oblique lateral stripe is present; it is complete but becoming diffused anteriorly or incomplete. Toe webbing is extensive.

The male call is a long trill composed of paired pulsed notes. Tadpoles measure up to 37 mm (1.5 in) in total length, and newly metamorphosed juveniles about 10–11 mm (0.39–0.43 in).

== Etymology ==
Scientists gave this frog the scientific name maculosus for "spotted" or "mottled," referring to its dorsal coloration.

== Habitat and conservation ==
The range of Hyloxalus maculosus is within lowland evergreen forest and foothill evergreen forest vegetation zones. Males have been found calling on rocky streams at both sides of a road and inside water ducts that cross under the road. One male carrying nine tadpoles was found near a tiny pond, on a rocky stream surrounded by pasture. Tadpoles have been found in slow-running water in the ditch. The tadpoles are translucent in color with a brown stripe on the back. There are two pale dots near the oral disk.

The International Union for Conservation of Nature assessed Hyloxalus maculosus as "data deficient" in 2008, but Páez-Vacas and her colleagues suggested in 2010 that it should be considered as "Critically Endangered" because of its small range and habitat loss occurring in that range. In 2023, the IUCN released a new assessment, classifying the frog as "endangered". Principal threats include water pollution and deforestation in favor of agriculture, logging, and cattle husbandry.

The frog was found near two protected parks, and scientists infer that its range may include both Parque Nacional Llanganates and Parque Nacional Sangay.
