= Hyloxalus spilotogaster =

Conservation status
- Data Deficient (IUCN 3.1)

Scientific classification
- Kingdom: Animalia
- Phylum: Chordata
- Class: Amphibia
- Order: Anura
- Family: Dendrobatidae
- Genus: Hyloxalus
- Species: H. spilotogaster

Binomial name
- Hyloxalus spilotogaster (Duellman, 2004)

Synonyms
- Colostethus spilotogaster Duellman, 2004

Species of frog

Hyloxalus spilotogaster is a species of frog in the family Dendrobatidae. It is known from a single specimen found in Peru.

== Description ==
The single specimen, an adult female, measured 24.0 mm in snout-vent length. She had expanded climbing disks and fringed skin on the toes of all four feet. In preservative, the skin of the head and body was dull brown with some dark brown stripes. The lips were cream-white in color. The sides of the body were brown with some white marks. There were light brown stripes on flanks from the nose over the eye to where the hind legs meet the body. These were bordered by a dark brown stripe below each. The tops of the back legs were light brown with some other brown spots. The rest of the back legs were brown with some white spots. The front legs were light brown with dark brown lines. The belly was cream-white in color with brown spots.

== Habitat ==
Scientists known this frog exclusively from the type locality in Utcubamba Province in Amazonas, 2326 meters above sea level in the Cordillera Colán. They observed exactly one female frog and no male frogs. She was on the leaf litter in a cloud forest. Scientists believe that the frog's tadpoles swim in streams, but they did not observe any.

== Threats ==
The IUCN classifies this species as data deficient. Scientists believe the fungal disease chytridiomycosis may pose a threat because it killed so many other stream-breeding, high-elevation-dwelling frogs in Peru, but they do not know for certain.

== Original description ==
- Duellman, W. E. (2004). "Frogs of the Genus Colostethus (Anura; Dendrobatidae) in the Andes of Northern Peru". Scientific Papers Natural History Museum University of Kansas. 35: 1–49.
