= Hyloxalus faciopunctulatus =

Conservation status
- Data Deficient (IUCN 3.1)

Scientific classification
- Kingdom: Animalia
- Phylum: Chordata
- Class: Amphibia
- Order: Anura
- Family: Dendrobatidae
- Genus: Hyloxalus
- Species: H. faciopunctulatus

Binomial name
- Hyloxalus faciopunctulatus (Rivero, 1991)

Synonyms
- Colostethus faciopunctulatus Rivero, 1991

Species of frog

Hyloxalus faciopunctulatus is a species of frog belonging to the family Dendrobatidae. It is endemic to Colombia and is specifically found in its type locality, Puerto Nariño, located in the Amazonas Department near the Peruvian border. It is likely to be found in Peru and Brazil.

== Habitat ==
Its natural habitats are tropical moist lowland forests. This frog has been observed on the ground between 20 and 400 meters above sea level.

== Reproduction ==
Scientists believe this frog breeds through larval development, that the female frog lays eggs on the ground, and that the adult frogs carry the tadpoles to water after the eggs hatch.

== Threats ==
The IUCN classifies this species as data deficient, meaning its threat level is not well understood. However, it does appear to face some threat from habitat loss caused by the expansion of agriculture. Scientists note, however, that there appears to be a large amount of the frog's forest habitat remaining.
