= Hyloxalus pumilus =

Conservation status
- Critically Endangered (IUCN 3.1)

Scientific classification
- Kingdom: Animalia
- Phylum: Chordata
- Class: Amphibia
- Order: Anura
- Family: Dendrobatidae
- Genus: Hyloxalus
- Species: H. pumilus

Binomial name
- Hyloxalus pumilus (Rivero, 1991)

Synonyms
- Colostethus pumilus Rivero, 1991

Species of amphibian

Hyloxalus pumilus is a species of frogs in the family Dendrobatidae. It is endemic to southern Ecuador where it is only known from its type locality in the Azuay Province.

== Description ==
The adult male frog measures about 16.8 mm in snout-vent length and the adult female frog is 12.4–18.1 mm long. There are two spots on the gular-pectoral area. The adult female frog has a white belly.

== Habitat ==
Scientists observed this frog in a cloud forest 2987 meters above sea level.

== Reproduction ==
Scientists have not observed this frog's mode of reproduction, but they infer that the larvae swim in streams.

== Threats ==
The IUCN classifies this frog as critically endangered and estimates the current population at fewer than 249 individuals. Principal threats are habitat loss in favor of agriculture and logging. Introduced trout can also hurt this frog. Scientists have observed the fungal disease chytridiomycosis on other frogs in Hyloxalus, so they believe the disease may also affect this species.
