= Hyloxalus pulchellus =

Conservation status
- Near Threatened (IUCN 3.1)

Scientific classification
- Kingdom: Animalia
- Phylum: Chordata
- Class: Amphibia
- Order: Anura
- Family: Dendrobatidae
- Genus: Hyloxalus
- Species: H. pulchellus

Binomial name
- Hyloxalus pulchellus (Jiménez de la Espada, 1875)

Synonyms
- Phyllodromus pulchellum Jiménez de la Espada, 1875; Colostethus pulchellum (Jiménez de la Espada, 1875); Colostethus tergogranularis Rivero, 1991; Colostethus taeniatus (Andersson, 1945)

Species of frog

Hyloxalus pulchellus is a species of frog in the family Dendrobatidae from the Andes of northern Ecuador and southern Colombia.

== Distribution ==
Hyloxalus pulchellus is found in the inter-Andean páramos of northern Ecuador and adjacent southern Colombia (Nariño, Cauca, and Putumayo Departments) and on the eastern slopes of the Andes from southern Colombia south in Ecuador to the headwaters of the Pastaza River. Its altitudinal range is 1,590–2,970 m (5,220–9,740 ft) asl; at the higher end of this range it is the only frog species of this kind.

The frog's range includes many protected parks: Parque Nacional Sumaco Napo-Galeras, Reserva Ecológica Antisana, Parque Nacional Llanganates, Reserva Ecológica Cayambe-Coca, Bosque Protector Sierra Azul, and more in Colombia.

== Description ==
Males measure 17–22 mm (0.67–0.87 in) and females 20–24 mm (0.79–0.94 in) in snout–vent length. Dorsum is dark brown with diffuse greenish tint. It has an oblique lateral stripe extending to eye, cream with iridescent golden tint in colour and sometimes edged with brown or black.

== Behaviour ==
Male frogs call in or from under grass. The call is a buzz emitted 72 times during 4 minutes.

== Habitat and conservation ==
Its natural habitats are dry and humid montane forests. It is threatened by habitat loss, possibly also climate change and chytridiomycosis. It has disappeared from many sites in Ecuador but remains common in Colombia.

The IUCN classifies this frog as near threatened. It suffers from habitat loss associated with the construction of human habitation and roads, logging, and the introduction of non-native predatory fish. There was a large die-off of these frogs during the 1990s, but it is uncertain what caused it. Climate change and the fungal disease chytridiomycosis are the two main possibilities.
