= Hyloxalus eleutherodactylus =

Conservation status
- Data Deficient (IUCN 3.1)

Scientific classification
- Kingdom: Animalia
- Phylum: Chordata
- Class: Amphibia
- Order: Anura
- Family: Dendrobatidae
- Genus: Hyloxalus
- Species: H. eleutherodactylus

Binomial name
- Hyloxalus eleutherodactylus (Duellman, 2004)

Synonyms
- Colostethus eleutherodactylus Duellman, 2004

Species of frog

Hyloxalus eleutherodactylus is a species of frog in the family Dendrobatidae. It is endemic to Peru.

== Description ==
The adult male frog measures 21.0 mm in snout-vent length and the adult female frog 22.7 mm. The skin of the dorsum is brown in color. The flanks are black with interrupted cream-white stripes. The upper surfaces of the thighs and upper forelegs are yellow with brown marks; the ventral surfaces are white. The venter is yellow in color. The iris of the eye is light copper in color. The male frog's testes are white in color.

== Habitat ==
This frog is diurnal. Scientists saw it near a stream in a disturbed rainforest. Scientists know this frog exclusively from the type locality, 360 meters above sea level in the Amazon Basin.

== Reproduction ==
Scientists infer that the female frog lays her eggs on the ground, like other frogs in Hyloxalus. After the eggs hatch, the adult frogs carry the tadpoles to water. Scientists saw one male frog with five tadpoles on his back at the same time.

At stage 25, the tadpole measures 3.8–4.3 mm long in body and 10.8–11.2 mm long in total (including the tail).

== Threats ==
The IUCN classifies this frog as data deficient. Because scientists observed the frogs in a disturbed rainforest, they infer that it may be tolerant to some habitat disturbance.

== Original description ==
- Duellman, W. E. (2004). "Frogs of the Genus Colostethus (Anura; Dendrobatidae) in the Andes of Northern Peru". Scientific Papers Natural History Museum University of Kansas. 35: 1–49.
