= Hyloxalus pinguis =

Conservation status
- Endangered (IUCN 3.1)

Scientific classification
- Kingdom: Animalia
- Phylum: Chordata
- Class: Amphibia
- Order: Anura
- Family: Dendrobatidae
- Genus: Hyloxalus
- Species: H. pinguis

Binomial name
- Hyloxalus pinguis (Rivero & Granados-Díaz, 1990)

Synonyms
- Colostethus pinguis Rivero and Granados-Díaz, 1990

Species of frog

Hyloxalus pinguis or the Malvasa rocket frog is a species of frog in the family Dendrobatidae. It is endemic to Colombia where it is only known from its type locality, on the Cordillera Central, the Cauca Department.

== Habitat ==
This frog lives in open areas, including cattle pastures. This frog has been observed between 2930 and 3205 meters above sea level. The type locality is within the buffer zone of the Puracé National Natural Park.

== Reproduction ==
The frog breeds in human-made bodies of water, such as canals, so long as there are bushes and shrubs nearby. Because the frog has been found near heavily polluted bodies of water, including those polluted with human bodily waste, scientists believe this animal is good at living in disturbed habitats.

== Threats ==
The IUCN classifies this frog as endangered. While there is some threat from habitat loss associated with farming, including potato farming, it is relatively limited. More pronounced, says the IUCN, is pollution generated from those farms.
