= Hyloxalus shuar =

Conservation status
- Critically Endangered (IUCN 3.1)

Scientific classification
- Kingdom: Animalia
- Phylum: Chordata
- Class: Amphibia
- Order: Anura
- Family: Dendrobatidae
- Genus: Hyloxalus
- Species: H. shuar

Binomial name
- Hyloxalus shuar (Duellman and Simmons, 1988)

Synonyms
- Colostethus shuar Duellman and Simmons, 1988

Species of frog

Hyloxalus shuar is a species of frog in the family Dendrobatidae. It is endemic to Ecuador and Peru and is currently known from only two locations, though formerly widespread. The common English-language names Santiago rocket frog and Shuar rocket frog have been proposed for it.

== Description ==
Males measure 24–31 mm (0.94–1.22 in) and females 25–32 mm (0.98–1.26 in) in snout–vent length. The frog has an uninterrupted lateral line down each side of its body. The male frog has a gray throat and white testicles.

== Etymology ==
Scientists named this frog after the Shuar indigenous people, also known as Jíbaros. A team of Shuar helped scientist John E. Edwards on his surveys through the Cordillera del Cóndor.

== Reproduction ==
Scientists believe that the female frog lays eggs on the ground and the male frog carries the tadpoles to water after they hatch, but none have reported observing this.

== Habitat and conservation ==
Its natural habitats are premontane and cloud forests at around 1270 to 2370 m above sea level. This frog was once more widespread, but scientists have only recently confirmed it in two places: One place in Santa Rosa in Peru and one place in Morona Santiago in Ecuador.

Regarding the frog's habits, scientists caught one specimen under vegetation at night and others active on the forest floor during the day.

The frog's range once included several protected parks, none of which are believed to host any as of 2023: Parque Nacional Sumaco Napo-Galeras, Parque Nacional Sangay, Parque Nacional Llanganates, the Reserva Ecológica Antisana, and the Reserva Ecológica Cayambe-Coca.

== Threats ==
In the 1970s and 1980s, this frog had a large population, but there has been a precipitous dropoff since then. Scientists believe there are no more than 250 adult frogs alive today, no more than 50 in any one place. Subsequent surveys to many other parts of the frog's range have produced no specimens. It is now believed to be absent from the areas near the Reventador volcano, the Río Quijos-Topo low place, Zamora, and the Cordillera del Condór. In 2008, scientists found one frog in Morona Santiago in Ecuador and four frogs in Santa Rosa in Peru. Scientists believe many of the frogs died from habitat loss associated with agriculture and logging and from the fungus Batrachochytrium dendrobatidis, which causes the disease chytridiomycosis. Habitat loss and water pollution are ongoing threats, but scientists are not certain whether chytridiomycosis still poses any threat, even though some frogs still test positive for B. dendrobatidis.
