= Hyloxalus sordidatus =

Conservation status
- Data Deficient (IUCN 3.1)

Scientific classification
- Kingdom: Animalia
- Phylum: Chordata
- Class: Amphibia
- Order: Anura
- Family: Dendrobatidae
- Genus: Hyloxalus
- Species: H. sordidatus

Binomial name
- Hyloxalus sordidatus (Duellman, 2004)

Synonyms
- Colostethus sordidatus Duellman, 2004

Species of frog

Hyloxalus sordidatus is a species of frog in the family Dendrobatidae. It is endemic to Peru.

== Description ==
The adult male frog measures 29.9 mm in snout-vent length and the adult female frog is 36.1 mm. This frog has climbing disks on the toes of all four feet. The skin of the dorsum is light brown in color. There are dark brown bars on all four legs. The posterior surfaces of the legs are light brown. There is a dark brown stripe from the nose to the eye to the ear all the way to the groin. There is a dull white stripe from the middle of the body to the groin. There is a dark brown crescent-shaped mark on each foreleg. The adult male frog has a gray belly and the adult female frog has a white belly. The throat and chest are bright yellow. The scutes are gray-tan in color. The iris of the eye is red-bronze in color with black marks and a brown stripe in it. The male frog's testes are white in color.

The frog's voice sounds like a high-pitched whistle. It emits ten notes at a time.

== Habitat ==
Scientists observed this frog in exactly two places, both in the Cordillera Central, one 500 meters above sea level and the other 520 meters above sea level. This frog has been found cut-over rainforests and in dry thorn forests. This frog was observed near streams. During the day, this frog hides under big rocks. This frog is nocturnal.

== Reproduction ==
Scientists observed tadpoles swimming in streams. At stage 25, the tadpole is 12.5 mm long in body and 30.0 mm long including the tail. The body is globular and wider than it is tall. The nose is round as viewed from above or from the sides. Its eyes are on the top of its head and look out to the top and sides. The body is brown in color and the tail is light orange in color.

== Threats ==
The IUCN classifies this frog as data deficient. Because it was found in cut-over rainforest, scientists believe it may be good at living in disturbed habitats.

== Original description ==
- Duellman, W. E. (2004). "Frogs of the Genus Colostethus (Anura; Dendrobatidae) in the Andes of Northern Peru". Scientific Papers Natural History Museum University of Kansas. 35: 1–49.
