= Hyloxalus peculiaris =

Conservation status
- Critically Endangered (IUCN 3.1)

Scientific classification
- Kingdom: Animalia
- Phylum: Chordata
- Class: Amphibia
- Order: Anura
- Family: Dendrobatidae
- Genus: Hyloxalus
- Species: H. peculiaris

Binomial name
- Hyloxalus peculiaris (Rivero, 1991)

Synonyms
- Colostethus peculiaris (Rivero, 1991)

Species of amphibian

Hyloxalus peculiaris is a species of frogs in the family Dendrobatidae. It is endemic to Ecuador where it is only known from its type locality, "Pailas" in the Morona-Santiago Province, on the eastern slope of the Andes.

== Body ==
The adult male frog measures about 26.5 mm in snout-vent length and the adult female frog 29.0–29.8 mm. The frog has two discrete marks on its gular-chest area. The skin of the frog's belly and throat is the color of a coffee stain.

== Home ==
Scientists know this frog exclusively from the type locality, a cloud forest on a mountain 2195 meters above sea level. The precipitation ranges between 1000 and 2000 mm annually and the temperature between 18 and 24 °C.

Scientists saw this frog in a protected park: Parque Nacional Rio Negro Sopladora.

== Reproduction ==
Scientists have not observed this frog's young in the wild, but they infer that the tadpoles develop in streams.

== Threats ==
Scientists caught and examined at four adult specimens in 1962, but this species has not been formally observed since. It is possible that this frog is extinct. If not, scientists estimate, then there are fewer than 250 alive today, all in the same population. Principal threats are habitat loss associated with logging and agriculture. The IUCN classifies this animal as critically endangered.
