= Hyloxalus insulatus =

Conservation status
- Vulnerable (IUCN 3.1)ref name=IUCN/>

Scientific classification
- Kingdom: Animalia
- Phylum: Chordata
- Class: Amphibia
- Order: Anura
- Family: Dendrobatidae
- Genus: Hyloxalus
- Species: H. insulatus

Binomial name
- Hyloxalus insulatus (Duellman, 2004)

Synonyms
- Colostethus insulatus Duellman, 2004

Species of frog

Hyloxalus insulatus is a species of frog in the family Dendrobatidae. It is endemic to Peru.

== Description ==
The adult male frog measures 22.2 mm in snout-vent length and the adult female frog 26.0 mm. The skin of the dorsum is red-brown in color with four darker brown marks in the middle of the back. The two closest to the head are chevron-shaped. The lips and parts of the forelegs are white in color. There are climbing disks on the toes of all four feet. The upper parts of the front legs are brown with gray-white mottling. The sides of the body are gray and brown in color with white stripes. The dorsal surfaces of the back legs are brown with darker brown marks. The rest of the legs have white marks. The throat is gray in color with two black spots. The belly is white in color. The ventral surfaces of the back legs are gray in color with some orange spots. The iris of the eye is bronze in color with some black marks. The male frog's testes are white in color.

== Habitat ==
Scientists observed this frog in rocky montane streams the Cordillera Central and Cordillera Occidental and in dry areas where cactus plants grew. They also saw it in some roadside water. Scientists saw this frog in the Río Marañón valley between 1260 and 2600 meters above sea level and in a few other areas.

== Reproduction ==
Scientists infer that the female frog lays her eggs on the ground and that, after the eggs hatch, the adult frogs carry them to water, like the frog's congeners.

During stage 34 of its development, the tadpole can be 13.0 mm in body length and 38.8 mm in total length. It has a round body, and the eyes are located dorsolaterally. The iris of the eye is light bronze in color. The body is olive brown in color and the tail is brown with olive-brown spots.

== Threats ==
The IUCN classifies this frog as vulnerable to extinction, citing the principal threats of pollution and habitat loss associated with fires set to clear the land for agriculture. Farmers also divert water from streams for irrigation, which may affect the frog's breeding sites. Because scientists saw the frogs next to roads, they think it may tolerate disturbed habitats.

Scientists also think the fungal disease chytridiomycosis may have affected this frog's population, as it killed many stream-breeding frogs in Peru.

== Original description ==
- Duellman, W. E. (2004). "Frogs of the Genus Colostethus (Anura; Dendrobatidae) in the Andes of Northern Peru". Scientific Papers Natural History Museum University of Kansas. 35: 1–49.
