= Hyloxalus mystax =

Conservation status
- Endangered (IUCN 3.1)

Scientific classification
- Kingdom: Animalia
- Phylum: Chordata
- Class: Amphibia
- Order: Anura
- Family: Dendrobatidae
- Genus: Hyloxalus
- Species: H. mystax

Binomial name
- Hyloxalus mystax Duellman & Simmons, 1988

Synonyms
- Colostethus mystax

Species of frog

Hyloxalus mystax is a species of frog in the family Dendrobatidae. It is endemic to Ecuador where it is only known from its type locality on the Cordillera del Cóndor at 1,830 m (6,000 ft) asl.

== Description ==
Males measure 19.5–21.5 mm (0.77–0.85 in) and females 19.2–22.8 mm (0.76–0.90 in) in snout–vent length. They have scattered dark spots on the abdomen. Males have pronounced black stippling on the throat. The male call is a rapid series of chirps. The iris of the eye is brown in color. There is a line near the mouth that resembles a mustache. Scientists named this frog mystax for this trait.

== Habitat and conservation ==
The species' natural habitats are cool montane cloud forests with plenty of bromeliad plants. It was fairly common when the type series was collected in 1972. It subsequently went unobserved until a survey in 2009 turned up one adult and several tadpoles. More were found in 2012 and 2018.

Scientists observed the frog one protected park, Reserva Biológica Cerro Plateado, and near enough two other protected parks that they infer it may live there as well: Reserva Biológica El Quimi and Refugio de Vida Silvestre El Zarza.

The IUCN classifies this frog as endangered, citing habitat loss from deforestation associated with gold and copper mining. They believe the population will fall by 50 percent between 2023 and 2033.
