= Dendropsophus riveroi =

Conservation status
- Least Concern (IUCN 3.1)

Scientific classification
- Kingdom: Animalia
- Phylum: Chordata
- Class: Amphibia
- Order: Anura
- Family: Hylidae
- Genus: Dendropsophus
- Species: D. riveroi

Binomial name
- Dendropsophus riveroi (Cochran and Goin, 1970)

Synonyms
- Hyla riveroi Cochran and Goin, 1970

Species of frog

Dendropsophus riveroi is a species of frog in the family Hylidae. It is found in the upper Amazon Basin in western Brazil, Bolivia, Peru, Ecuador, and southern Colombia. In Ecuador it has been mixed with the newly described Dendropsophus shiwiarum. The specific name honours Juan A. Rivero.

== Description ==
Dendropsophus riveroi is a small species: males measure 19–20 mm (0.75–0.79 in) and females 22–23 mm (0.87–0.91 in) in snout–vent length. Coloration varies by the time of the day: the dorsal color is light yellow at night, with bronze marking. During the day, coloration varies between bronze and cream with brown markings and ill-defined brown stripes on the canthals and above the tympanums. The skin is smooth dorsally and granular ventrally. The fingers are one-fourth webbed and the toes two-thirds webbed.

== Habitat and conservation ==
Its natural habitats are secondary and primary tropical rainforests where it occurs on arboreally. They congregate for breeding in temporary ponds and swampy areas. Dendropsophus riveroi is not a common species, but there are no significant threats to this widespread species.
