= Puerto Rico Zoological Society =

Organization

The Puerto Rico Zoological Society (Sociedad Zoológica de Puerto Rico) was founded by Dr. Juan A. Rivero, a professor of Biology of the University of Puerto Rico at Mayagüez. Dr. Rivero went on to serve as the Society's first president.

The Zoological Society contributed to the development of Puerto Rico's only zoo, located at the UPR Mayagüez campus, named by the Legislature in 1998 as the "Dr. Juan A. Rivero Zoo".
