= Hyloxalus delatorreae =

Conservation status
- Critically Endangered (IUCN 3.1)

Scientific classification
- Kingdom: Animalia
- Phylum: Chordata
- Class: Amphibia
- Order: Anura
- Family: Dendrobatidae
- Genus: Hyloxalus
- Species: H. delatorreae

Binomial name
- Hyloxalus delatorreae Coloma, 1995

Synonyms
- Colostethus delatorreae Coloma, 1995

Species of frog

Hyloxalus delatorreae is a species of frog in the family Dendrobatidae. It is endemic to the western slopes of the Andes in extreme northern Ecuador.

== Etymology ==
Scientists named this frog after Stella de la Torre, who helped collect the specimens of this and other species.

== Habitat ==
It is only known from four nearby locations in the Carchi Province. Its natural habitats are wetlands and bogs, and it can also be found on areas of cattle ranching surrounded by forest remnants, at elevations of 2,340–3,000 m (7,680–9,840 ft) asl.

== Reproduction ==
This frog breeds between February and June. The female frogs lay eggs on the ground. After the eggs hatch, the male frogs carry the tadpoles to streams and ponds where they develop further.

The tadpoles are dark brown in color. Some of the muscles are cream-white in color with brown flecks.

== Description ==
Males measure 18–21 mm (0.71–0.83 in) and females 19–21 mm (0.75–0.83 in) in snout–vent length. The skin of the dorsum is gray-brown in color. There is a gold or cream line down each side of the body starting at the eye. The female frog has a white belly. The male frog's belly has white spots. There are two dark spots where the front legs meet the body. The male frog's testicles are white in color.

== Threats ==
The IUCN classifies this frog as critically endangered. The principal threat is habitat loss associated with agriculture, logging, and cattle husbandry. Scientists also cite the fungal disease chytridiomycosis as a possible threat. Scientists estimate the population at 49 mature adults or fewer and note that the destruction of even one marsh could wipe out the entire population.
