= Hyloxalus littoralis =

Conservation status
- Least Concern (IUCN 3.1)

Scientific classification
- Kingdom: Animalia
- Phylum: Chordata
- Class: Amphibia
- Order: Anura
- Family: Dendrobatidae
- Genus: Hyloxalus
- Species: H. littoralis

Binomial name
- Hyloxalus littoralis (Péfaur, 1984)

Synonyms
- Colostethus littoralis Péfaur, 1984

Species of frog

Hyloxalus littoralis (in Spanish: ranita silbadora; in English Lima rocket frog) is a species of frog in the family Dendrobatidae. It is endemic to Peru where it is known from Lima (the type locality, a small pond found in front of the beach), Huánuco, and Ancash Regions. Population near Lima was an introduction one and may now be extinct in that location.

== Habitat ==
This frog is more readily heard than seen. Its natural habitats are coastal "desert" and dry shrublands. It usually occurs close to streams with dense vegetation. It is a common and adaptable species. Scientists believe it can tolerate some habitat disturbance. It natural altitudinal range is 665–2,800 m (2,182–9,186 ft) asl.

The frog's known range includes at least one protected park: Pantanos de Villa Reserved Zone in Lima.

== Reproduction ==
This frog has reproduces in still water near streams.

== Status and threats ==
The IUCN classifies this frog as least concern of extinction. There is some agriculture near its habitat, but scientists do not believe that poses a threat to the frog.
