= Hyloxalus felixcoperari =

Scientific classification
- Domain: Eukaryota
- Kingdom: Animalia
- Phylum: Chordata
- Class: Amphibia
- Order: Anura
- Family: Dendrobatidae
- Genus: Hyloxalus
- Species: H. felixcoperari

Binomial name
- Hyloxalus felixcoperari Acosta-Galvis and Vargas Ramírez, 2018

Species of frog

Hyloxalus felixcoperari is a species of frog in the family Dendrobatidae. It is endemic to Colombia.

== Description ==
Scientists found three adult male frogs, which measured between 20.3 and 20.8 mm long in snout-vent length and three adult female frogs, which were 21.4 to 23.8 mm long. The skin of the frog's upper lip is light brown or cream-white in color with small dark brown spots near the edges. The skin of the dorsum is light brown in color with darker brown spots and reticulations. The skin of the frog's forelegs is red-brown in color with spots and reticulations. The flanks are dark brown with white spots. The sides of the hind legs are red-brown in color with some dark brown stripes. The rear portions of the back legs are yellow in color and sometimes have dark brown marks or patterns. The cloacal area is dark in color with white spots. This species shows sexual dimorphism in its coloration: The adult male frog has a dark brown chest and throat and the adult female frog has a white chest, throat, and belly. The frog has a dark black stripe down each side of its body to its groin.

== Habitat ==
Scientists know this frog solely from the type locality, between 2500 and 2577 meters above sea level in the Cordillera Oriental. They observed the frog in a cloud forest in the mountains. This area, Las Nubes Private Natural Reserve, is a protected park.

== Reproduction ==
This frog is awake during the warmest part of the day. The male frog chooses a territory about 1–4 m away from other males. He sits in the leaf litter and calls to the female frogs. Scientists observed one female frog carrying three tadpoles on her back.

The tadpoles have oval-shaped bodies. At stage 26, the few specimens observed were about 3.8 to 4.4 mm long not counting the tail and 8.6 to 9.7 mm in total.

== Original description ==
- Acosta-Galvis AR; Vargas-Ramírez M. (2018). "A new species of Hyloxalus Jiménez De La Espada 1871 "1870" (Anura: Dendrobatidae: Hyloxalinae) from a cloud forest near Bogotá, Colombia, with comments on the subpunctatus clade". Vertebrate Zoology. 68: 123–141.
