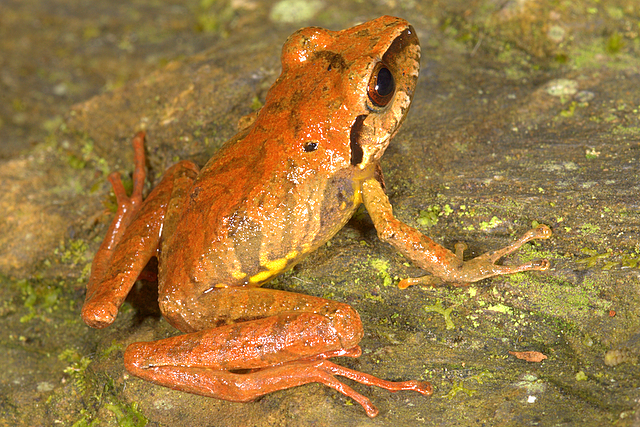

Conservation status
- Least Concern (IUCN 3.1)

Scientific classification
- Kingdom: Animalia
- Phylum: Chordata
- Class: Amphibia
- Order: Anura
- Family: Strabomantidae
- Genus: Pristimantis
- Subgenus: Pristimantis
- Species: P. danae

Binomial name
- Pristimantis danae (Duellman, 1978)

Synonyms
- Eleutherodactylus danae Duellman, 1978

= Pristimantis danae =

Species of frog

Pristimantis danae is a species of frog in the family Strabomantidae, sometimes known as Cuzco robber frog. It is found in the Andes between southern Peru and north-western Bolivia. It is named after the daughter of the author, Dana K. Duellman, who helped in collecting the frogs. Pristimantis reichlei, described in 2009, was previously confused with Pristimantis danae.

== Description ==
Male Pristimantis danae grow to a snout–vent length of 27–34 mm (1.1–1.3 in) and females to 38–46 mm (1.5–1.8 in). Body is moderately robust, with head slightly longer than it is wide. The snout is rounded in dorsal view and in profile. The tympanum is prominent. Forearms are slender and hind limbs are limbs long and slender. The fingers and the toes have lateral fringes and bear wide discs; the toes have also basal webbing. Skin on dorsum is finely shagreened; its color is yellowish tan to dark reddish brown with dark brown chevrons. The ventral side is pale yellow, and the hidden surfaces of the thighs are dark brown with pale yellow spots.

== Habitat ==
Pristimantis danae occurs in primary and secondary tropical moist forests at elevations of 500–1,700 m (1,600–5,600 ft) above sea level. This common frog may be found perched on low vegetation in cloud forest at night. It does not occur in modified habitats.
