= Hyloxalus patitae =

Conservation status
- Data Deficient (IUCN 3.1)

Scientific classification
- Kingdom: Animalia
- Phylum: Chordata
- Class: Amphibia
- Order: Anura
- Family: Dendrobatidae
- Genus: Hyloxalus
- Species: H. patitae

Binomial name
- Hyloxalus patitae (Lötters, Morales & Proy, 2003)

Synonyms
- Colostethus patitae Lötters, Morales & Proy, 2003

Species of amphibian

Hyloxalus patitae is a species of frogs in the family Dendrobatidae. It is endemic to Peru where it is only known from its type locality near Comunidad Nativa de Davis, Cordillera El Sira, Pasco Region.

== Habitat ==
The frog was observed in lowland rainforests between 210 and 800 meters above sea level in the Cordillera El Sira. The area included streams, caves, and waterfalls where the frog could shelter.

Scientists believe the frog's range might include the El Sira Communal Reserve. This is an indigenous people's reserve, not a protected wildlife park.

== Reproduction ==
Scientists infer that the female frog lays eggs on the ground, but they have not observed this directly. They have observed male frogs carrying tadpoles on their backs. Other frogs in this genus lay eggs on the ground and the adults carry tadpoles to water after the eggs hatch.

== Threats ==
The IUCN classifies this frog as data deficient. Presumably, it is threatened by deforestation in favor of logging and cattle grazing.
