= Hyloxalus fuliginosus =

Conservation status
- Endangered (IUCN 3.1)

Scientific classification
- Kingdom: Animalia
- Phylum: Chordata
- Class: Amphibia
- Order: Anura
- Family: Dendrobatidae
- Genus: Hyloxalus
- Species: H. fuliginosus

Binomial name
- Hyloxalus fuliginosus Jiménez de la Espada, 1871

Synonyms
- Colostethus fuliginosus (Jiménez de la Espada, 1871)

Species of frog

Hyloxalus fuliginosus or the Quijos rocket frog is a species of frog in the family Dendrobatidae. It is endemic to Ecuador where it is known from the Amazonian slopes of the Andes in the northern Ecuador, with some sources reporting it from Colombia and Venezuela.

== Description ==
Males measure about 24 mm (0.94 in) and females 28–33 mm (1.1–1.3 in) in snout–vent length. The skin of the dorsum is dark green-brown in color. There is a line down each side of the body. The frogs exhibit visual sexual dimorphism: the male frogs have gray chests and female frogs have cream-white chests with or gray spots. The male frog's testicles are white in color.

== Habitat ==
Its natural habitats are cloud forests where it occurs near streams. They have been observed during the day under rocks and logs. People have seen this frog between 572 and 1926 meters above sea level.

The frog's small range includes one protected park: Parque Nacional Cayambe Coca.

== Young ==
Scientists infer that this frog breeds through larval development in streams.

== Threats ==
The IUCN Red List classifies this frog as endangered due to its small range and ongoing threats. Water pollution and habitat loss in the form of deforestation in favor of agriculture and cattle grazing are the principal threats. Invasive species also affect this population.
