= Hyloxalus awa =

Conservation status
- Least Concern (IUCN 3.1)

Scientific classification
- Kingdom: Animalia
- Phylum: Chordata
- Class: Amphibia
- Order: Anura
- Family: Dendrobatidae
- Genus: Hyloxalus
- Species: H. awa

Binomial name
- Hyloxalus awa (Coloma, 1995)

Synonyms
- Colostethus awa Coloma, 1995

Species of frog

Hyloxalus awa is a species of frog in the family Dendrobatidae. It is endemic to Ecuador and known from the western Andean slopes and the western Pacific lowlands.

== Description ==
Males measure 16–22 mm (0.63–0.87 in) and females 19–26 mm (0.75–1.02 in) in snout–vent length. Dorsum is reddish brown with diffuse dark marks. Flanks are dark gray.

== Etymology ==
Scientists named this frog awa for the Awa indigenous people. They live in some of the same places as the frog. The word "Awa" means "people."

== Reproduction ==
The male call is a trill of about 3–5 seconds in duration, emitted at a rate of six calls per minute. Males are territorial and aggressive towards other males. Under laboratory conditions, mating takes place in morning and clutch size is 4 to 21 eggs. Eggs are laid on leaf-litter or low vegetation; the adults carry the tadpoles on their back to nearby streams where they complete their development.

== Habitat and conservation ==
Natural habitats of Hyloxalus awa are humid sub-montane tropical forest at elevations of 40–1,327 m (131–4,354 ft) above sea level. It is threatened by habitat loss due to agriculture (both crops and livestock), logging, and agricultural pollution.

The frog's range includes several protected park: Reserva Ecológica Manglares Cayapas Mataje, Refugio de Vida Silvestre Manglares Estuario del Río Muisne, Reserva Ecológica Mache-Chindul, Reserva Ecológica Cotacachi-Cayapas, Refugio de Vida Silvestre El Pambilar, Reserva Ecológica Los Ilinizas.
