= Hyloxalus fascianigrus =

Conservation status
- Vulnerable (IUCN 3.1)

Scientific classification
- Kingdom: Animalia
- Phylum: Chordata
- Class: Amphibia
- Order: Anura
- Family: Dendrobatidae
- Genus: Hyloxalus
- Species: H. fascianigrus

Binomial name
- Hyloxalus fascianigrus (Grant & Castro-Herrera, 1998)

Synonyms
- Colostethus fascianiger; Hyloxalus fascianiger

Species of amphibian

Hyloxalus fascianigrus is a species of frogs in the family Dendrobatidae. It is endemic to Colombia.

== Habitat ==
This terrestrial frog has been observed in leaf litter near streams in primary and secondary cloud forests, never in any non-forest habitat. Scientists observed this frog between 1470 and 1960 meters above sea level.

This frog's range includes several protected parks, including Munchique National Park, Los Farallones de Cali National Park, and Rio Anchicaya Forest Reserve.

== Reproduction ==
The female frog lays eggs on the ground. After the eggs hatch, the male frog carries them to water in streams or pools.

== Threats ==
The IUCN classifies this frog as vulnerable to extinction, with between 250 and 1000 mature individuals alive at any one time, as of a 2017 report by the Amphibian Specialist Group. They attribute the loss of population to the mass amphibian die-off associated with the fungal disease chytridiomycosis in the 1990s. The other principal threat to this frog is habitat fragmentation associated with cattle ranching and both legal and illegal agriculture.
