= Hyloxalus alessandroi =

Conservation status
- Endangered (IUCN 3.1)

Scientific classification
- Kingdom: Animalia
- Phylum: Chordata
- Class: Amphibia
- Order: Anura
- Family: Dendrobatidae
- Genus: Hyloxalus
- Species: H. alessandroi

Binomial name
- Hyloxalus alessandroi (Grant & Rodríguez, 2001)

Synonyms
- Colostethus alessandroi Grant and Rodriguez, 2001; Allobates alessandroi (Grant and Rodriguez, 2001)

Species of frog

Hyloxalus alessandroi is a species of frog in the family Dendrobatidae. It is endemic to Peru where it is known from the Cusco and Puno Regions.

== Habitat ==
This frog has been observed in two separate locations, about 100 km apart: San Pedro, Kosñipata in Cusco and San Gaban in Puno. This diurnal animal has been observed near riparian habitats in primary cloud forests. It has been observed between 820 and 1480 meters above sea level.

The frog's range includes one protected area: Manu National Park.

== Reproduction ==
Scientists infer that this frog lays eggs on the ground and that the adults carry the hatched tadpoles to water. Scientists have observed the male frogs calling from streams, mossy rocks, or fallen vegetation and from hiding places near such areas.

== Threats ==
The IUCN classifies this frog as endangered. They name the fungal disease chytridiomycosis as the principal threat. Scientists last saw the frog in it Manu Park habitat in 1999. No recent surveys have been conducted in San Gaban, where the principal threats are habitat loss in favor of agriculture, particularly coffee.
