= Hyloxalus exasperatus =

Conservation status
- Critically Endangered (IUCN 3.1)

Scientific classification
- Kingdom: Animalia
- Phylum: Chordata
- Class: Amphibia
- Order: Anura
- Family: Dendrobatidae
- Genus: Hyloxalus
- Species: H. exasperatus

Binomial name
- Hyloxalus exasperatus (Lynch and Duellman, 1988)

Synonyms
- Colostethus exasperatus Duellman and Lynch, 1988

Species of frog

Hyloxalus exasperatus or the Yapitya rocket frog is a species of frog in the family Dendrobatidae. It is endemic to Ecuador and found on the eastern slopes of the Andes in Pastaza and Morona-Santiago Provinces. However, it is suggested that specimens from Pastaza represent a different, possibly undescribed species.

== Description ==
Males measure 17.5–20 mm (0.69–0.79 in) and females 21 mm (0.83 in) in snout–vent length (based on only six and two specimens, respectively). Toe webbing is absent but it has a dorsolateral stripe and a short oblique lateral stripe. It is similar to Hyloxalus whymperi but lacks heavy darkening on the abdomen of males. Male call is unknown.

== Etymology ==
Students of South American frogs named this frog exasperatus for feelings of frustration and exasperation while waiting fifteen years for scientist Stephen R. Edwards to finish writing his reassessment of the genus Colostethus.

== Habitat ==
Its natural habitats are pluvial premontane and very humid premontane forests. Its altitudinal range is 970–1,981 m (3,182–6,499 ft) asl.

Scientists found some of these frogs in one protected park: Bosque Protector Cordillera Kutuku-Shaimi.

== Reproduction ==
Scientists believe the frog reproduces the same way many other frogs in Hyloxalus do: the female frog lays eggs on the ground and the male frog carries the tadpoles to streams.

== Threats ==
The IUCN classifies this frog as critically endangered and possibly extinct. Scientists believe that there are no more than 250 alive today, no more than 50 in each separate population.

It is threatened by habitat loss and degradation caused by agricultural expansion, logging, and gold and copper mining.
