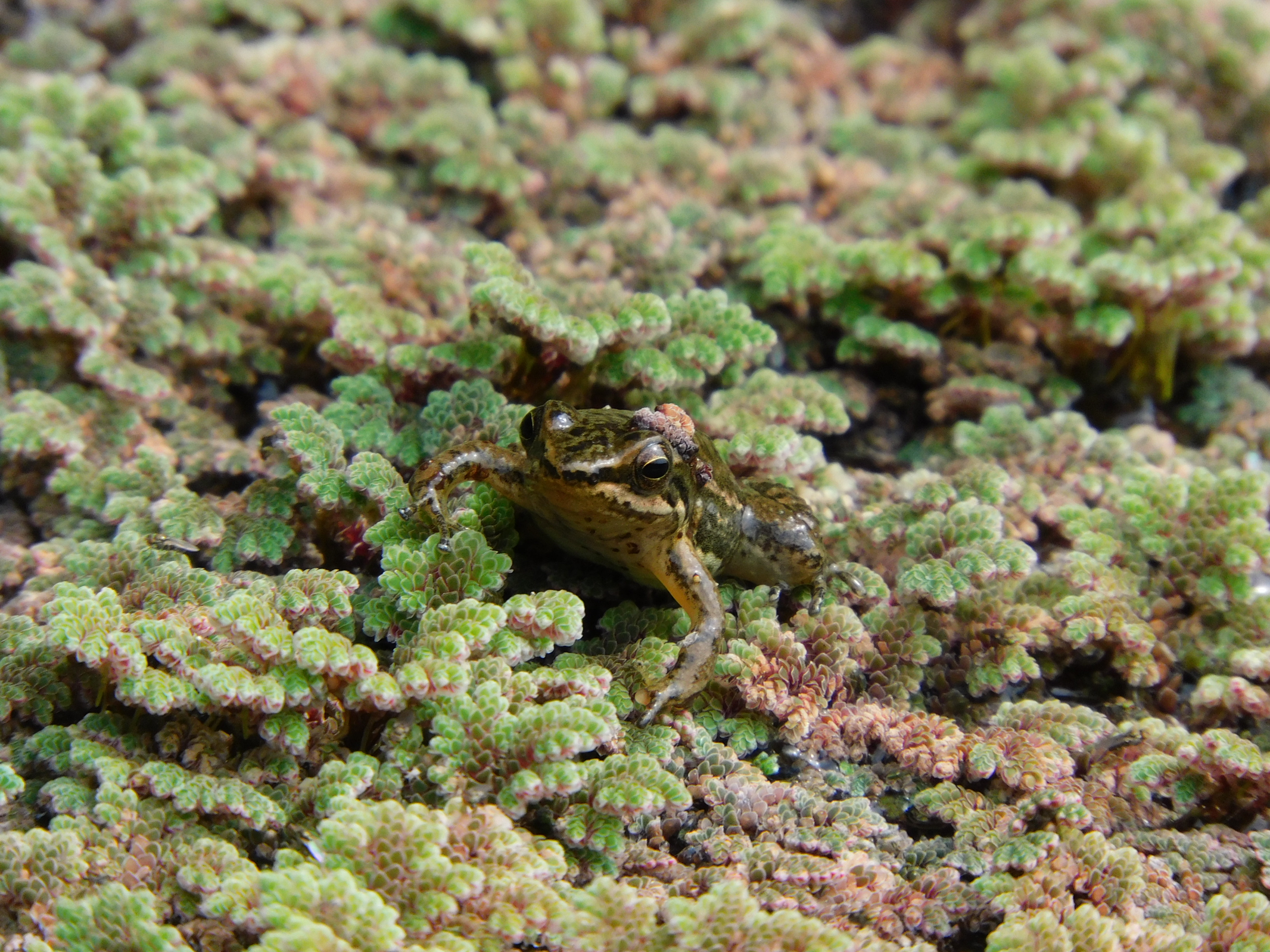

Conservation status
- Least Concern (IUCN 3.1)

Scientific classification
- Kingdom: Animalia
- Phylum: Chordata
- Class: Amphibia
- Order: Anura
- Family: Dendrobatidae
- Genus: Hyloxalus
- Species: H. elachyhistus

Binomial name
- Hyloxalus elachyhistus (Edwards, 1971)

Synonyms
- Colostethus elachyhistus Edwards, 1971

= Hyloxalus elachyhistus =

Species of frog

Hyloxalus elachyhistus is a species of frog in the family Dendrobatidae. It is found in southern Ecuador (both versants of the Andes) and northern Peru, in the Huancabamba Depression and south to Cajabamba Province.

== Description ==
Hyloxalus elachyhistus shows considerable intraspecies variability, and it might represent more than one species. Ecuadorian males measure 18–24 mm (0.71–0.94 in) and females 21.5–28 mm (0.85–1.10 in) in snout–vent length. Peruvian specimens are smaller: males measure 17–20 mm (0.67–0.79 in) and females 19–23 mm (0.75–0.91 in) SVL. Dorsum varies in colour between populations, from pale olive to brown. There is a pale yellow to tan oblique lateral stripe, usually narrowly bordered by dark brown or black.

== Reproduction ==
Males may protect the egg clutch. Both males and females may transport the tadpoles. Back-riding tadpoles vary in size, from about 10 to 17 mm (0.39 to 0.67 in) in total length. Largest free-swimming tadpoles are 38 mm (1.5 in) in total length.

== Habitat and conservation ==
The IUCN classifies this frog as least concern of extinction, but the government of Peru classifies it as endangered and that of Ecuador as vulnerable. Its natural habitats are dry and humid lowland and premontane forests between elevations of 540 and 2760 meters above sea level.. It occurs near streams, especially in dry forests. It is threatened by habitat loss in favor of logging, agriculture, and cattle grazing, but it has shown some tolerance to disturbed habitats. Declines at high elevations have taken place even in suitable habitat and could be due to chytridiomycosis. Scientists also cite invasive predatory fish and pollution as possible threats.

The frog's range includes several protected parks, such as Reserva Ecológica de Chaparri, and Área de Conservación Regional Bosques Secos Salitral-Huarmaca, Reserva Ecológica Buenaventura, and Reserva Laipuna.
