= Hyloxalus sylvaticus =

Conservation status
- Endangered (IUCN 3.1)

Scientific classification
- Kingdom: Animalia
- Phylum: Chordata
- Class: Amphibia
- Order: Anura
- Family: Dendrobatidae
- Genus: Hyloxalus
- Species: H. sylvaticus

Binomial name
- Hyloxalus sylvaticus (Barbour and Noble, 1920)

Synonyms
- Colostethus sylvaticus (Barbour and Noble, 1920); Phyllobates sylvatica Barbour and Noble, 1920

Species of frog

Hyloxalus sylvaticus is a species of frog in the family Dendrobatidae. It is endemic to northern Peru and found on the Amazonian slopes of the Eastern Andes and in the Huancabamba Depression. Its range might extend to Ecuador.

== Description ==
The adult male frog measures 25.7 mm in snout-vent length and the adult female frog 30.0. All toes sport disks for climbing and fringed skin. The skin of the dorsum is dark olive-brown in color to light copper-brown in color. There are dark brown and black marks on the back. There is light dark gray and brown on the toes with light gray on the scutes. The top of the mouth is tan in color. The stripes on the sides of the body are light brown in color. The throat, posterior of the belly, and ventral surfaces of the hind legs are dark yellow or orange in color. The chest and the remainder of the belly are gray in color with black marks. The iris of the eye is bronze in color with black marks. The male frog's testes are white in color.

The male frog's voice sounds like a trill.

== Habitat ==
This frog lives in cloud forests on the east side of the Andes Mountains and in the Huancabamba Depression. It is diurnal, and it has been observed active near streams during the day. At night, people have found it in and near streams and under rocks. This frog has a total elevation range of 1920 to 3250 meters above sea level.

== Threats ==
The IUCN classifies this frog as endangered. It is threatened largely by deforestation in favor of agriculture and by the fungal disease chytridiomycosis.

Because this frog lives in mountaintop habitats, scientists speculate that climate change could pose further threat, either by rendering its habitat too dry or through competition from other species from lower elevations migrating uphill
