= Hyloxalus fallax =

Conservation status
- Critically Endangered (IUCN 3.1)

Scientific classification
- Kingdom: Animalia
- Phylum: Chordata
- Class: Amphibia
- Order: Anura
- Family: Dendrobatidae
- Genus: Hyloxalus
- Species: H. fallax

Binomial name
- Hyloxalus fallax (Rivero, 1991)

Synonyms
- Colostethus fallax Rivero, 1991

Species of amphibian

Hyloxalus fallax is a species of frogs in the family Dendrobatidae. It is endemic to Ecuador and only known from the region of its type locality in the Cotopaxi Province, on the western slopes of the Andes. Common name Cotopaxi rocket frog has been coined for this species.

== Description ==
Males measure 16–19 mm (0.63–0.75 in) and females 17 mm (0.67 in) in snout–vent length (based on only four and two specimens, respectively). It differs from related Ecuadorian species by not having webbing between its toes and by lack of oblique lateral stripe (sometimes a short stripe is present) and a pale dorsolateral stripe. Male call is a single, sharp peep.

== Etymology ==
Scientists gave this species the Latin name fallax for "deceptive" because it resembles another frog that also lives in Ecuador.

== Habitat and conservation ==
The IUCN classifies this frog as critically endangered and possibly extinct. This species is known from very humid premontane and low humid montane forest. One male was collected from a bromeliad. Its altitudinal range is 1,760–2,430 m (5,770–7,970 ft) asl. Scientists estimate there are no more than 250 mature individuals alive now, no more than 50 in one place. It is threatened by habitat loss and degradation caused by agricultural expansion and logging.
