= Hyloxalus sanctamariensis =

Scientific classification
- Kingdom: Animalia
- Phylum: Chordata
- Class: Amphibia
- Order: Anura
- Family: Dendrobatidae
- Genus: Hyloxalus
- Species: H. sanctamariensis

Binomial name
- Hyloxalus sanctamariensis Acosta-Galvis and Pinzón, 2018

Species of frog

Hyloxalus sanctamariensis is a species of frog in the Dendrobatidae family. It is endemic to Colombia, where it was observed near a town called Santa Maria.

The frog's call involves 124 sounds per minute with 5 harmonics between the frequencies of 4213.3 and 5828.2 Hz.
