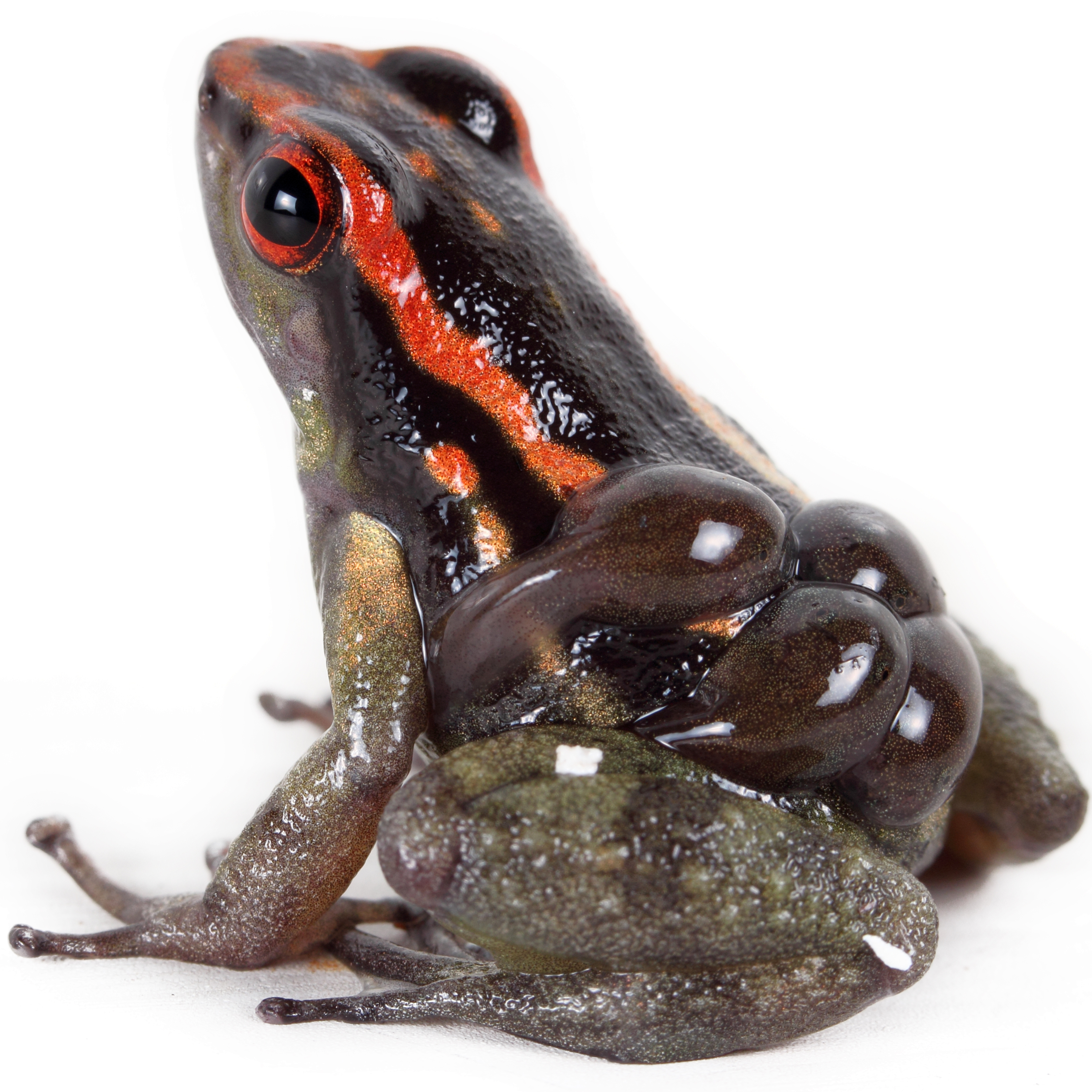

Conservation status
- Least Concern (IUCN 3.1)

Scientific classification
- Kingdom: Animalia
- Phylum: Chordata
- Class: Amphibia
- Order: Anura
- Family: Dendrobatidae
- Genus: Hyloxalus
- Species: H. nexipus

Binomial name
- Hyloxalus nexipus (Frost, 1986)

Synonyms
- Colostethus nexipus Frost, 1986; Colostethus citreicola Rivero, 1991

= Hyloxalus nexipus =

Species of frog

Hyloxalus nexipus is a species of frog in the family Dendrobatidae. It is found on eastern slopes and foothills of the Andes from southeastern Ecuador south to the region of Yurimaguas in Peru.

== Description ==
Hyloxalus nexipus males measure 20–24 mm (0.79–0.94 in) and females 19–23 mm (0.75–0.91 in) in snout–vent length. Dorsum is greenish black. Adult males have blacker throats than females. Juveniles have tiny white spots on the dorsum in the sacral region and on the legs. There is usually a dorsolateral as well as an oblique lateral stripe extending to eye. The iris of the eye is copper-red in color. The testicles are black in color.

== Reproduction ==
Calling males have been observed during the daytime; one called from a stone at the edge of a river. The call consists of 20–29 notes, lasting 1–2 seconds. Females lay the eggs on leaf litter. Tadpoles are transported to streams by adults and develop in quiet pools in or adjacent to the watercourse. An adult male has been observed carrying 12 tadpoles.

The tadpoles are brown in color and wider than they are tall. Some individuals have lighter brown stripes on their bodies. The tail is light brown in color with darker brown flecks. A newly metamorphosed juvenile frog measures about 12 mm (0.47 in).

== Habitat and conservation ==
Its natural habitats are very humid to humid premontane forests and dry forest. It is mostly restricted to rocky stream habitats and waterfalls. It can also occur in modified and lightly degraded habitats, including rural gardens and cutover forest. Scientists observed these frogs between 325 and 810 meters above sea level in Peru and between 500 and 1550 meters above sea level in Ecuador.

Hyloxalus nexipus is not rare where it occurs. It is classified as least concern by the IUCN, which cites only pollution and major habitat loss as threats. As of 2018, scientists had not confirmed whether this frog is captured for the international pet trade.

The frog's known range includes two protected parks: Santiago Comaina Reserved Zone and Alto Mayo Protection Forest. Scientists believe it may live in Sangay National Park too.
