= Hyloxalus abditaurantius =

Conservation status
- Critically endangered, possibly extinct (IUCN 3.1)

Scientific classification
- Kingdom: Animalia
- Phylum: Chordata
- Class: Amphibia
- Order: Anura
- Family: Dendrobatidae
- Genus: Hyloxalus
- Species: H. abditaurantius

Binomial name
- Hyloxalus abditaurantius (Silverstone, 1975)

Synonyms
- Colostethus abditaurantius Silverstone, 1975

Species of frog

Hyloxalus abditaurantius is a species of frog in the family Dendrobatidae. It is endemic to Colombia.

== Habitat ==
This terrestrial frog has been observed on the grounds and on vegetation near water in sub-montane forest habitats in the Andes. It has been observed in secondary forest, which has led scientists to believe that it may tolerate some habitat disturbance. This frog has been observed between 1280 and 2110 meters above sea level.

The frog's range includes at least four protected parks: Parque Regional Ucumari, Parque Regional Barbas-Bremen, Parque Nacional Tatamá, and Parque Nacional Farrallones de Cali.

== Reproduction ==
The female frog lays eggs on leaf litter. After the eggs hatch, the adult frogs carry the tadpoles to water.

== Threats ==
The IUCN classifies this frog as critically endangered. It suffers from habitat loss associated with agriculture, logging, and livestock cultivation, and from pollution. Considerable mortality may be attributable to the fungal disease chytridiomycosis, but scientists are not sure. The fungus Batrachochytrium dendrobatidis has been confirmed in frogs of this species since 1997.
