= Hyloxalus lehmanni =

Conservation status
- Near Threatened (IUCN 3.1)

Scientific classification
- Kingdom: Animalia
- Phylum: Chordata
- Class: Amphibia
- Order: Anura
- Family: Dendrobatidae
- Genus: Hyloxalus
- Species: H. lehmanni

Binomial name
- Hyloxalus lehmanni (Silverstone, 1971)

Synonyms
- Colostethus lehmanni Silverstone, 1971

Species of frog

Hyloxalus lehmanni is a species of frog in the family Dendrobatidae. It is found widely in Colombia from Antioquia southwards along the Cordillera Occidental and Cordillera Central to northern Ecuador (Cotopaxi Province).

== Description ==
Males measure 15–20 mm (0.59–0.79 in) and females 17–23 mm (0.67–0.91 in) in snout–vent length. Abdomen is black in males but white or gray in females. An oblique lateral stripe that extends to eye is present.

== Etymology ==
The species' Latin name refers to F. Carlos Lehmann V.

== Young ==
The female frog lays eggs in the leaf litter and the male frog carries the tadpoles to streams with slow-flowing water for further development.

== Habitat and conservation ==
Its natural habitats are very humid montane forest, but it has also been found in open fields and very modified areas. It always occurs near streams. Its altitudinal range is 1,500–2,580 m (4,920–8,460 ft) in Colombia and 1,460–2,120 m (4,790–6,960 ft) in Ecuador.

The frog's range includes several protected parks, including Parque Nacional Sumaco Napo-Galeras, Reserva Ecológica Cayambe-Coca, and Reserva Natural Comunitaria El Manantial Florencia.

Hyloxalus lehmanni is common in Colombia, but has dramatically declined in Ecuador, possibly due to chytridiomycosis. Also habitat loss, introduction of alien predatory fish, and pollution are threats. Scientists also cite deforestation in favor of legal farms, illegal farms, timber harvesting, and sites for human habitation as threats. Spraying of illegal crops also creates pollution that affects this species.
