= Hyloxalus ruizi =

Conservation status
- Critically Endangered (IUCN 3.1)

Scientific classification
- Kingdom: Animalia
- Phylum: Chordata
- Class: Amphibia
- Order: Anura
- Family: Dendrobatidae
- Genus: Hyloxalus
- Species: H. ruizi

Binomial name
- Hyloxalus ruizi (Lynch, 1982)

Synonyms
- Colostethus ruizi Lynch, 1982

Species of amphibian

Hyloxalus ruizi is a species of frog in the family Dendrobatidae. It is endemic to Colombia and only known from the Eastern Ranges of the Colombian Andes, in the Cundinamarca Department.

== Habitat ==
Its natural habitats are cloud forests, where it has been observed on the ground. It has not been observed outside primary forest. Scientists found this frog between 2410 and 2469 meters above sea level.

== Reproduction ==
Scientists infer that this frog breeds in streams through larval development, but this has not been formally reported.

== Threats ==
This species is known from six individuals observed in 1979. Since then, there have been many expedition's near the type locality, but scientists never recorded the frog again. The IUCN classifies this species as critically endangered. It is threatened by deforestation in favor of agriculture and cattle grazing. Scientists note that pollution from nearby pig farming can contaminate the streams that frogs need to breed.
