= Hyloxalus utcubambensis =

Conservation status
- Data Deficient (IUCN 3.1)

Scientific classification
- Kingdom: Animalia
- Phylum: Chordata
- Class: Amphibia
- Order: Anura
- Family: Dendrobatidae
- Genus: Hyloxalus
- Species: H. utcubambensis

Binomial name
- Hyloxalus utcubambensis (Morales, 1994)

Synonyms
- Colostethus utcubambensis Morales, 1994

Species of frog

Hyloxalus utcubambensis is a species of frog in the family Dendrobatidae. It is endemic to Peru and only known from its type locality near Tingo, Río Utcubamba drainage, on the western slope of the northern Cordillera Oriental. Its natural habitats presumably are cloud forests.
