= Sky-blue poison frog =

Sky-blue Poison Frog

Conservation status
- Endangered (IUCN 3.1)

Scientific classification
- Kingdom: Animalia
- Phylum: Chordata
- Class: Amphibia
- Order: Anura
- Family: Dendrobatidae
- Genus: Hyloxalus
- Species: H. azureiventris

Binomial name
- Hyloxalus azureiventris (Kneller and Henle, 1985)

Synonyms
- Phyllobates azureiventris Kneller and Henle, 1985; Dendrobates azureiventris (Kneller and Henle, 1985); Epipedobates azureiventris (Kneller and Henle, 1985); Cryptophyllobates azureiventris (Kneller and Henle, 1985); Ameerega azureiventris (Kneller and Henle, 1985)

Species of amphibian

The sky-blue poison frog (Hyloxalus azureiventris) is a species of poison dart frog. It is endemic to Peru and known from the lower eastern versant of the Andes in the upper Amazon basin of the San Martín Region.

== Habitat and ecology ==
The species habitat is primarily lowland tropical rainforests as well as inland wetlands of Peru. The adult frog seems to prefer caves and rock piles, but juvenile frogs have been observed in the leaf litter. Little is known about the species' adaptability to modified habitats. This frog has been observed between 200 and 1200 meters above sea level.

This frog's range includes at least one protected park: Cordillera Escalera Regional Conservation Area.

== Reproduction ==
People hear the male frogs calling to the female frogs at dusk. They perch on rocks or sit in crevices. The female frog lays 12–16 eggs in water in coconut shells, in hollows in the leaf litter, or in water in bromeliad plants. The male frogs guard the eggs during the two weeks they take to hatch. After that, the male frogs carry the tadpoles to water in streams, bromeliad plants, or even water-filled fallen palm leaves.

The tadpoles can grow to 11.5 mm. The end of the tail is round. Each tadpole has five rows of teeth, two on top and three on the bottom. The tadpoles are dark gray in color.

== Taxonomy ==
The species has been placed in numerous genera, including the new genus Cryptophyllobates erected for it. However, it is now placed in Hyloxalus; although Hyloxalus azureiventris represents a distinct clade within Hyloxalus, recognizing it formally would render the rest of Hyloxalus paraphyletic.

== Description ==
The adult frog measures about 27 mm long in snout-vent length. The frog's skin has a black base color with bright aposematic coloration. There are yellow stripes reaching from the nose over the eyes to the back legs. There are more yellow stripes from the nose to the front legs. The upper surfaces of the back, front legs, and back legs have blue-green marbling. The flanks are black in color, and all four legs have bright blue marks.

== Conservation status and threats ==
Due to the decreasing population of sky-blue poison frogs, the species is ranked as endangered by the IUCN. The major threat to the species is habitat loss resulting from human residential and commercial development and agriculture.

== Relationship to humans ==
This frog does appear in the international pet trade, but unlike with other similarly beautiful frogs, scientists do not claim that this poses a threat to the species' survival. Legal export took place during the mid 00s, and the frog can be bred in captivity.
