= Hyloxalus edwardsi =

Conservation status
- Critically Endangered (IUCN 3.1)

Scientific classification
- Kingdom: Animalia
- Phylum: Chordata
- Class: Amphibia
- Order: Anura
- Family: Dendrobatidae
- Genus: Hyloxalus
- Species: H. edwardsi

Binomial name
- Hyloxalus edwardsi (Lynch, 1982)

Synonyms
- Colostethus edwardsi Lynch, 1982

Species of amphibian

Hyloxalus edwardsi (common name: Edwards' rocket frog) is a species of frogs in the family Dendrobatidae. It is endemic to the Cordillera Oriental in the Cundinamarca Department, Colombia.

== Description ==
The adult female frog measures about 30.8 to 37.3 mm in snout-vent length and the adult male frog 27.5 to 27.6 mm. The skin of the dorsum is medium brown in color with darker brown spots so thick that they can appear to be almost reticulation. Sometimes the middles of the spots seem to be lighter in color because of raised warts. The mouth can have white or yellow spots. The flanks are dark brown with lighter brown spots. The hidden surfaces of the limbs are dark olive color to light brown color with more brown spots. There are bars on the legs. The legs also have spots. The skin of the ventrum is olive or brown with yellow spots. Larger frogs have bellies that are almost white in color with brown marks. There is a little orange color on the throat and bottoms of the legs. Larger adult frogs have a yellow stripe from the eye to the front leg, but scientists are not sure whether this is a matter of sexual dimorphism or of size. The iris of the eye is copper in color with black streaks and reticulations. This frog does not have a vocal sac, so scientists believe it does not call.

== Etymology ==
This species is named edwardsi after Stephen R. Edwards from the University of Kansas Natural History Museum, a colleague of John D. Lynch who described this species in 1982.

== Habitat ==
This frog lives near streams in forest and cave habitats. It has been observed on both sides of the Cordillera Oriental, specifically in La Cueva de las Moyas the Páramo de Cruz Verde, between 3030 and 3300 meters above sea level. Its habitat suffers from significant fragmentation, with some populations of this frog separated by a stretch of cattle grazing land, where the frogs cannot live.

== Reproduction ==
Viewed dorsally, this frog's tadpole resembles an elongated ellipse. It has a round snout as viewed from the top or sides. The top fin and back fin are the same depth for most of their lengths. The tadpoles are brown on the top and translucent in the belly and throat. The muscles in the tail are cream or olive in color with brown spots that extent into the fins. The tadpoles swim in streams that are .3 to .5 m deep.

== Threats ==
The IUCN classifies this frog as critically endangered, which means that the frog could be extinct but is not necessarily extinct. Scientists last saw this frog in 1996 and have not seen it since, despite survey trips to the frog's known range. Scientists cite the frog's small range (8 km^{2}), ongoing deradation to that habitat, and habitat fragmentation as threats. Deforestation in favor of agriculture, logging, and urbanization continue to threaten the frog's habitat, and water pollution from urban runoff and climate change may also affect this species.
