= Hyloxalus pulcherrimus =

Conservation status
- Data Deficient (IUCN 3.1)

Scientific classification
- Kingdom: Animalia
- Phylum: Chordata
- Class: Amphibia
- Order: Anura
- Family: Dendrobatidae
- Genus: Hyloxalus
- Species: H. pulcherrimus

Binomial name
- Hyloxalus pulcherrimus (Duellman, 2004)

Species of amphibian

Hyloxalus pulcherrimus is a moderately large species of poison dart frog endemic to Peru. It is only known to be found in two streams near Cutervo.

== Description ==
The adult male frog can measure as much as 28.2 mm in snout-vent length and the adult female frog 29.7 mm. It has climbing disks on the toes of all four feet. The skin of the dorsum and head is gray-green in color with some copper-brown marks. The flanks are black with some blue-white marks. There are stripes on the sides of the body. These stripes are light brown in color near the head and blue-white nearer the vent. The throat and belly are cream-white in color. The ventral surfaces of the legs and feet are white with brown marks. The upper lip is pink-brown in color with some white. The male frog's testes are white in color.

== Habitat ==
This frog is diurnal. Scientists know this frog from its type locality, 2620 meters above sea level in the Cordillera Occidental. They saw it in streams that were near or on farms.

Scientists believe this frog might live in Cutervo National Park but they have not directly observed it there.

== Reproduction ==
Scientists infer that the female frog lays her eggs on the ground and that, after the eggs hatch, the adult frogs carry the tadpoles to water. They have not observed Hyloxalus pulcherrimus lay eggs or carry tadpoles, but they have observed other frogs in Hyloxalus do this.

== Threats ==
The IUCN classifies this frog as data deficient. Scientists believe this frog may be in some danger of dying out because of habitat loss associated with fires set to prepare the land for agriculture and from the diversion of water for irrigation. Pollution can also hurt this frog. Because scientists have seen the frogs next to roads, they think it may have some tolerance to habitat disturbance.

The fungal disease chytridiomycosis could have killed many of these frogs. Climate change could also pose a threat by changing the streams where the frog lives and breeds.

== Original description ==
- Duellman, W. E. (2004). "Frogs of the Genus Colostethus (Anura; Dendrobatidae) in the Andes of Northern Peru". Scientific Papers Natural History Museum University of Kansas. 35: 1–49.
