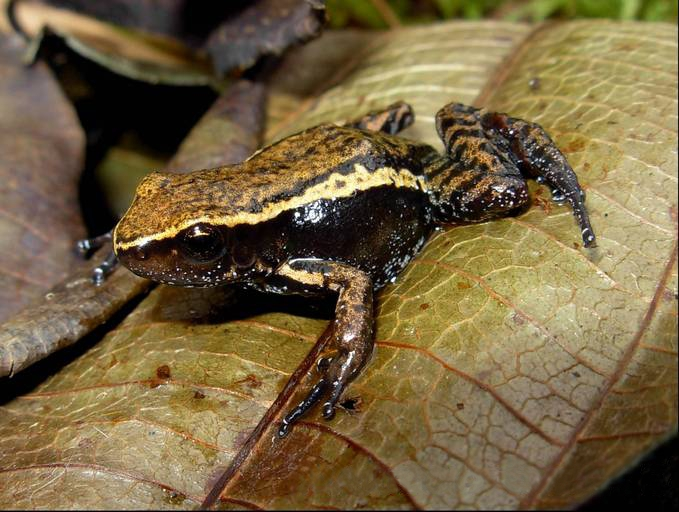

Conservation status
- Least Concern (IUCN 3.1)

Scientific classification
- Domain: Eukaryota
- Kingdom: Animalia
- Phylum: Chordata
- Class: Amphibia
- Order: Anura
- Family: Dendrobatidae
- Genus: Hyloxalus
- Species: H. subpunctatus

Binomial name
- Hyloxalus subpunctatus (Cope, 1899)

= Cream-backed poison frog =

Species of amphibian

The cream-backed poison frog (Hyloxalus subpunctatus) is a species of frog in the family Dendrobatidae endemic to Colombia. Its natural habitats are subtropical or tropical, high-altitude grassland, shrub-dominated wetlands, swamps, intermittent freshwater marshes, rural gardens, urban areas, and heavily degraded former forests. The cream-backed poison frog is one of the less-toxic of the family. It has undergone several name changes since its discovery. Originally called Dendrobates subpunctatus, its name was changed to Colostethus subpuctatus once the family Dendrobatidae underwent a division of species and genera other than Dendrobates were coined. Recently, minor skeletal differences have separated the cream-backed poison frog from the rocket frogs, and placed it in another genus entirely, Hyloxalus.

== Toxin ==
Like many of the genus Hyloxalus, H. subpunctatus possesses fairly weak toxins, compared to those of other dendrobatids. It may be one of the most primitive of dendrobatids, as it has only begun to develop skin alkaloids and is still fairly drab in coloration. Its poison is already an effective defense mechanism; if tasted by a predator, the alkaloids in the frog's skin cause extreme pain and unpleasant taste. This will usually discourage a predator from attacking a cream-backed poison frog more than once. However, H. subpunctatus is still vulnerable to more determined predators, such as snakes, which is further evidence that it may be a fairly young species compared to other inedible or even deadly dendrobatids.

== Description ==
The cream-backed poison frog is one of the smallest dendrobatids, reaching a length of 2 cm when fully grown. As stated above, it has poorly developed alkaloid poisons in its skin that make it unpalatable to predators, but it still mostly depends on its body camouflage for protection. Like many of the genus Hyloxalus, it has fairly drab coloration. Its main body is wood brown, with cream-colored stripes running down the length of its back (hence the frog's common name) and flanks that range from dark, smoky gray to inky black. H. subpunctatus may be one of the most primitive poison dart frogs, as it bears several similarities to hylids, such as long, narrow toes with suckerlike discs at the ends to help it grip leaves, slight webbing between its toes, and cryptic coloration. While hylids use the suckers on their toes to climb trees, the cream backed poison frog uses them to give it a good grip as it clambers through the leaf litter. Other dendrobatids lack webbing on their feet, and the discs at the tips of their toes are not adhesive. In addition, the cream-backed poison frog is one of the few species of dendrobatids that does not care for its young, another sign that it is a fairly primitive frog.

== Distribution and habitat ==
The cream-backed poison frog is native to the Altiplano Cundiboyacense highland region of the Eastern Cordillera in Boyacá, Cundinamarca and Meta Departments of central Colombia, at altitudes between 2,000 and 3,500 m (6,562 and 11,483 ft) above sea level. Its habitat is open areas, marshes, wetlands, forest edges, and páramo. It does not tolerate waters polluted by urban or agricultural runoffs.
