= Hyloxalus arliensis =

Scientific classification
- Kingdom: Animalia
- Phylum: Chordata
- Class: Amphibia
- Order: Anura
- Family: Dendrobatidae
- Genus: Hyloxalus
- Species: H. arliensis

Binomial name
- Hyloxalus arliensis Acosta-Galvis, Vargas-Ramírez, Anganoy-Criollo, Ibarra, and Gonzáles, 2020

Species of frog

Hyloxalus arliensis is a species of frog in the family Dendrobatidae. It is endemic to Colombia.

Scientists observed this frog in the Andes Mountains, between 565 and 1200 meters above sea level in Colombia's Cordillera Central and Cordillera Occidental.
