= Hyloxalus cepedai =

Conservation status
- Vulnerable (IUCN 3.1)

Scientific classification
- Kingdom: Animalia
- Phylum: Chordata
- Class: Amphibia
- Order: Anura
- Family: Dendrobatidae
- Genus: Hyloxalus
- Species: H. cepedai

Binomial name
- Hyloxalus cepedai (Morales, 2002)

Synonyms
- Colostethus cepedai Morales, 2000; Allobates cepedai(Morales, 2000)

Species of frog

Hyloxalus cepedai is a species of frog in the family Dendrobatidae. It is endemic to Colombia where it is known only from its type locality near Villavicencio in the Cordillera Oriental.

== Habitat ==
This diurnal, terrestrial frog has been observed on the leaf litter in submontane tropical forests and a few other types of habitats, including grasslands with shrubs, secondary forests, and areas near waterways. Its tolerance to disturbed habitats is unknown. This frog has been observed between 450 and 1120 meters above sea level.

Its range includes one protected park: Reserva Forestal Nacional Vanguardia.

== Reproduction ==
This frog breeds through larval development. The female frog lays eggs in the leaf litter. After they hatch, the male frog carries the tadpoles to water.

== Threats ==
The IUCN classifies this frog as vulnerable to extinction. Its principal threats are water pollution and habitat loss associated with agriculture and human habitation.

== Original description ==
- Morales (2002). "No title listed". Publ. Asoc. Amigos Donana. 13 (19).
