= Hyloxalus sauli =

Conservation status
- Least Concern (IUCN 3.1)

Scientific classification
- Kingdom: Animalia
- Phylum: Chordata
- Class: Amphibia
- Order: Anura
- Family: Dendrobatidae
- Genus: Hyloxalus
- Species: H. sauli

Binomial name
- Hyloxalus sauli (Edwards, 1974)

Synonyms
- Colostethus sauli Edwards, 1974

Species of frog

Hyloxalus sauli is a species of frogs in the family Dendrobatidae. It is found on the eastern Andean slopes in Putumayo, Colombia, and in Sucumbíos, Napo, Orellana, and Pastaza Provinces, Ecuador. It is named after William Saul from the University of Kansas Natural History Museum.

== Description ==
Males measure 20–25 mm (0.79–0.98 in) and females 22–29 mm (0.87–1.14 in) in snout–vent length. Dorsum and flanks are coffee-coloured; dorsum has three large blotches. There is a complete, pale oblique lateral stripe. Most individuals also have a ventrolateral stripe that is complete, diffuse, or interrupted. There is some sexual dimorphism in ventral coloration.

== Reproduction ==
Male call is a series of two or three quickly repeated peeps. Males and females form pairs and defend territories that can be stable over several months. These are defined by deep burrows used as shelter. Fecundity of females is 6–11 oocytes (based on three females), whereas males have been recorded carrying clutches of 9–13 tadpoles.

The tadpoles are clear-brown in color with other brown marks and a black mark on the tail.

== Habitat and conservation ==
Hyloxalus sauli occurs in primary and secondary forests at elevations of 200–800 m (660–2,620 ft) above sea level. It lives under leaf-litter near streams and on overhanging banks of permanent streams.

The frog's range includes several protected parks in Ecuador but none in Colombia: Parque Nacional Yasuní, Reserva de Producción de Fauna Cuyabeno, Reserva Biológica Limoncocha, Estación de Biodiversidad Tiputini.

Hyloxalus sauli is relatively widespread but uncommon species. It is assessed as being of "least concern", but habitat loss and degradation can be localised threats. The IUCN cites habitat loss in favor of agriculture, mining, livestock cultivation, and logging as threats.
