= Hyloxalus infraguttatus =

Conservation status
- Vulnerable (IUCN 3.1)

Scientific classification
- Kingdom: Animalia
- Phylum: Chordata
- Class: Amphibia
- Order: Anura
- Family: Dendrobatidae
- Genus: Hyloxalus
- Species: H. infraguttatus

Binomial name
- Hyloxalus infraguttatus (Boulenger, 1898)

Synonyms
- Phyllobates infraguttatus Boulenger, 1898; Colostethus infraguttatus (Boulenger, 1898)

Species of frog

Hyloxalus infraguttatus, also known as the Chimbo rocket frog, is a species of frog in the family Dendrobatidae. It is found on the Pacific slopes of the Andes in Ecuador, and, based on the Amphibian Species of the World and the Checklist of Colombian Amphibians, also in Nariño, southern Colombia (Colombian Massif). Based on the proximity of the southern limit of its known distribution to the Peruvian border, it is likely that it occurs in northern Peru too.

== Description ==
Males measure 17–21 mm (0.67–0.83 in) and females 20–23 mm (0.79–0.91 in) in snout–vent length. Dorsum colouration varies from greenish to pale and dark brown, spotted with dark brown. They have an oblique lateral stripe that extends to the eye. There are white spots on the throat and abdomen. The male's testicles are white in color.

== Reproduction ==
The frog reproduces at the end of the rainy season. Both adult males and females are territorial. The male frog calls to the female frogs. The female frog lays eggs on leaf litter and under rocks. After the eggs hatch, the male frog carries the tadpoles on his back to water. The males only care for one clutch at a time.

== Habitat and conservation ==
Hyloxalus infraguttatus occurs in humid premontane forests, tropical thickets and thorny scrubs, and very dry tropical forests near streams, water channels, road ditches, and pools at elevations of 70–1,500 m (230–4,920 ft) asl. It is a locally common species but its abundance has been declining. The IUCN classifies this frog as vulnerable to extinction because of habitat loss caused by agriculture, tree plantations, logging, and livestock grazing. Introduced goats also make considerable changes to the landscape.
