= Hyloxalus toachi =

Conservation status
- Vulnerable (IUCN 3.1)

Scientific classification
- Kingdom: Animalia
- Phylum: Chordata
- Class: Amphibia
- Order: Anura
- Family: Dendrobatidae
- Genus: Hyloxalus
- Species: H. toachi

Binomial name
- Hyloxalus toachi (Coloma, 1995)

Synonyms
- Colostethus toachi Coloma, 1995

Species of frog

Hyloxalus toachi is a species of frog in the family Dendrobatidae. It is endemic to northwestern Ecuador.

== Description ==
Males measure 18–23 mm (0.71–0.91 in) and females 25–28 mm (0.98–1.10 in) in snout–vent length. The adult male frog has a gray throat and the adult female frog has a white belly. There is a dark gray oblique stripe on each side of the body. The testicles are brown in color.

== Etymology ==
Scientists named the frog "Toachi" for the river and basin where it was found. The area hosts some of the most diverse populations of anurans on the planet.

== Reproduction ==
The female frog lays eggs in leaf litter. After the eggs hatch, the adult frogs carry them to water. The superficial surfaces of the tadpoles' bodies are brown in color.

== Habitat and conservation ==
Natural habitats of Hyloxalus toachi are humid tropical and very humid premontane forests. Scientists have seen this frog between 200 and 1410 meters above sea level. It is threatened by habitat loss associated with agriculture, livestock cultivation, logging, and agricultural pollution.

Scientists have seen this frog near two protected parks: Reserva Ecológica Cotacachi-Cayapas and Reserva Tesoro Escondido.
