= Atelopus onorei =

Conservation status
- Critically endangered, possibly extinct (IUCN 3.1)

Scientific classification
- Kingdom: Animalia
- Phylum: Chordata
- Class: Amphibia
- Order: Anura
- Family: Bufonidae
- Genus: Atelopus
- Species: A. onorei

Binomial name
- Atelopus onorei Coloma, Lötters, Duellman, and Miranda-Leiva, 2007
- Atelopus onorei is only known from its type locality in the Azuay Province.

Species of amphibian

Atelopus onorei is a small species of bright yellow and green toads in the family Bufonidae. It is endemic to Ecuador and is only known from the vicinity of its type locality on the western slope of the Cordillera Occidental in the Azuay Province. It has not been seen since 1990 and may now be extinct, but it is possible that overlooked populations remain.

== Etymology ==
The specific name petersi honors Giovanni Onore, an Italian missionary priest and entomologist who has also made significant amphibian collections. Common name Onore's harlequin frog has been coined for it.

== Description ==
Adult males measure 34–42 mm (1.3–1.7 in) and adult females 42–48 mm (1.7–1.9 in) in snout–vent length. The snout is acuminate. The tympanic membrane is absent. The fingers have no lateral fringes nor webbing whereas the toes are webbed. The dorsum and the limbs are orange yellow with varying degrees of green coverage (covering all but the extremities in one male), or occasionally pale yellowish brown with diffuse black blotches. The iris is aqua blue, with fine black reticulation and a fine bluish-white stripe at the upper margin of pupil.

== Habitat and conservation ==
Atelopus onorei was found in 1990 in cloud forest at the margin of the Río Chipla at an elevation of about 2,500 m (8,200 ft) above sea level and by a nearby creek. The individuals were active at the daytime and numerous pairs were in amplexus.

Atelopus onorei has never been seen again, despite several visits to the same site and its surroundings. The disappearance is attributed to the disease chytridiomycosis. Current threats are predation by trout and cattle grazing. If the species is not yet extinct, the remaining population is likely to be very small.
