= Hyloxalus vertebralis =

Conservation status
- Vulnerable (IUCN 3.1)

Scientific classification
- Kingdom: Animalia
- Phylum: Chordata
- Class: Amphibia
- Order: Anura
- Family: Dendrobatidae
- Genus: Hyloxalus
- Species: H. vertebralis

Binomial name
- Hyloxalus vertebralis (Boulenger, 1899)

Synonyms
- Colostethus vertebralis (Boulenger, 1899)

Species of frog

Hyloxalus vertebralis is a species of frog in the family Dendrobatidae. It is endemic to southern Ecuador and occurs in the inter-Andean valleys and on the western slopes of the Andes.

== Description ==
The adult male frog measures 14.1–17.5 mm in snout-vent length and the adult female frog 17–20.2 long. This frog has ventral marks that are darker in the male than in the female. The testicles are white in color.

== Habitat ==
This frog lives in cloud forests in valleys high in the Andes mountains. It also lives in open areas where livestock graze, in parks, and in human-made gardens. This frog is always observed near puddles or streams. The frogs perch on plants .3 to 3 meters above the ground. This frog has been observed between 1770 and 3500 meters above sea level.

The frog's known range includes several protected parks, for example Parque Nacional Cajas, Parque Nacional Río Negro Sopladora, Páramo, Matorral Interandino, Bosque Montano Oriental, and Bosque Montano Occidental.

== Reproduction ==
The female frog lays eggs on the ground. The male frog carries the tadpoles on his back to streams.

== Threats ==
The IUCN classifies this frog as vulnerable to extinction. During the 1990s, this frog, like many other amphibians in the area, suffered a massive die-off. Scientists believe this could be attributable to the fungal disease chytridiomycosis, but this has not been definitively confirmed.
