= Hyloxalus chlorocraspedus =

Conservation status
- Data Deficient (IUCN 3.1)

Scientific classification
- Kingdom: Animalia
- Phylum: Chordata
- Class: Amphibia
- Order: Anura
- Family: Dendrobatidae
- Genus: Hyloxalus
- Species: H. chlorocraspedus

Binomial name
- Hyloxalus chlorocraspedus (Caldwell, 2005)

Synonyms
- Cryptophyllobates chlorocraspedus Caldwell, 2005

Species of amphibian

Hyloxalus chlorocraspedus is a species of frogs in the family Dendrobatidae. It is only known from two locations: its type locality near Porto Walter, Acre state in Brazil, and another locality in the Ucayali Region of Peru.

== Habitat ==
Scientists observed this frog in primary forest, usually in open places where a treefall had disrupted the canopy.

== Reproduction ==
Scientists infer that the female frog lays eggs on the ground like its congeners, but they have not directly observed female Hyloxalus chlorocraspedus do so. After the eggs hatch, the adult frog carries the tadpoles to water, for example water in the trunk of a dead tree. Scientists did observe a male frog with tadpoles on his back.

== Threats ==
The IUCN classifies this frog as data deficient. Threats are unknown.

== Original description ==
- Caldwell JP (2005). "A new amazonian species of Cryptophyllobates (Anura: Dendrobatidae)". Herpetologica. 61: 449–461.
