= Hyloxalus ramosi =

Conservation status
- Endangered (IUCN 3.1)

Scientific classification
- Kingdom: Animalia
- Phylum: Chordata
- Class: Amphibia
- Order: Anura
- Family: Dendrobatidae
- Genus: Hyloxalus
- Species: H. ramosi

Binomial name
- Hyloxalus ramosi (Silverstone, 1971)

Synonyms
- Colostethus ramosi Silverstone, 1971

Species of frog

Hyloxalus ramosi is a species of frog in the family Dendrobatidae. It is endemic to Colombia where it is known from its type locality near San Rafael in the Antioquia Department, and from the Caldas Department, both on the Cordillera Central.

== Habitat ==
This frog's natural habitats are sub-Andean forests. It lives in the leaf litter. Larval habitat is unknown. Scientists speculate that it develops in streams. This frog has been observed between 850 and 1340 meters above sea level.

This frog's range includes some protected parks, including Selva de Florencia National Park, Punchina Regional Forest Reserve, and San Lorenzo Regional Forest Reserve.

== Threats ==
The IUCN classifies this frog as endangered because of considerable habitat loss in favor of urbanization, agriculture, cattle grazing, logging, gold mining, and, in recent years, large infrastructure projects.
