= Hyloxalus italoi =

Conservation status
- Least Concern (IUCN 3.1)

Scientific classification
- Kingdom: Animalia
- Phylum: Chordata
- Class: Amphibia
- Order: Anura
- Family: Dendrobatidae
- Genus: Hyloxalus
- Species: H. italoi

Binomial name
- Hyloxalus italoi Páez-Vacas, Coloma, and Santos, 2010

Species of frog

Hyloxalus italoi is a species of frog in the family Dendrobatidae. It is endemic to Ecuador and Peru.

== Description ==
The adult male frog measures between 19.1 and 27.0 mm long in snout-vent length and the adult female frog 21.6 to 30.1 mm long.

The skin of the dorsum shows cryptic coloration, brown or black as a base. There are lines down the sides of its body. There are three large marks on the back. The throat and chest are brown in color. The adult male frogs have white marks on the throat and chest. The adult female frog have cream or brown marks on the throat and chest. The adult male frog has a white belly with brown marks. The female frog has a cream-white belly.

== Etymology ==
Scientists named this frog italoi for Ítalo G. Tapia. He helped find many frogs.

== Habitat ==
Scientists observed this frog in evergreen forests the hills near the Andes Mountains, between 200 and 1000 meters above sea level. The frogs were in and near rocky streams. This frog is diurnal.

The frog's known range includes protected parks: Reserva de Bosque Tropical Fundación Hola Vida, Tuntanain Communal Reserve, and Zona Reservada Santiago-Comaina.

== Reproduction ==
The male frog perches on or near rocks and calls to the female frogs. The female frog lays eggs on the leaf litter. The male frog guards the eggs until they hatch and then carries the tadpoles to quiet pools. Scientists have observed one male frog had eight tadpoles on his back at the same time.

The tadpoles are brown in color with large dark blotches.

== Threats ==
The IUCN classifies this frog as least concern of extinction because of its large range and population. What threat it does face comes from logging, agriculture, and livestock cultivation.

== Original description ==
- Paez-Vacas MI; Coloma LA; Santos JC (2010). "Systematics of the Hyloxalus bocagei complex (Anura: Dendrobatidae), description of two new cryptic species, and recognition of H. maculosus". Zootaxa. 2111: 1–75.
