= Hyloxalus chocoensis =

Conservation status
- Endangered (IUCN 3.1)

Scientific classification
- Kingdom: Animalia
- Phylum: Chordata
- Class: Amphibia
- Order: Anura
- Family: Dendrobatidae
- Genus: Hyloxalus
- Species: H. chocoensis

Binomial name
- Hyloxalus chocoensis (Boulenger, 1912)

Synonyms
- Hylixalus chocoensis Boulenger, 1912; Colostethus chocoensis (Boulenger, 1912)

Species of frog

Hyloxalus chocoensis, sometimes known as the Choco rocket frog, is a species of frog in the family Dendrobatidae. It is found in western Colombia to east-central Panama (where it is the only member of this genus). In Colombia it is known from Chocó, Valle del Cauca, and Antioquia. Anomaloglossus confusus from northwestern Ecuador were formerly confused with this species, but the identity of many other populations remains uncertain. Taxonomic uncertainty hampers knowledge about the species.

== Description ==
Hyloxalus chocoensis measure up to 28 mm (1.1 in) in snout–vent length. Dorsum is gray in preservative. A light dorsolateral line extends from the eye along the upper side of the body to the rear, where it nearly meet the line from the other side. Thighs are lightly barred. The lip line is white.

== Habitat and conservation ==
Its natural habitats are lowland humid tropical forests. It is an extremely rare species threatened by habitat loss. The Panamanian population is within the Chagres National Park.
