= Hyloxalus yasuni =

Conservation status
- Least Concern (IUCN 3.1)

Scientific classification
- Kingdom: Animalia
- Phylum: Chordata
- Class: Amphibia
- Order: Anura
- Family: Dendrobatidae
- Genus: Hyloxalus
- Species: H. yasuni

Binomial name
- Hyloxalus yasuni Páez-Vacas, Coloma, and Santos, 2010

Species of frog

Hyloxalus yasuni is a species of frog in the family Dendrobatidae. It is endemic to Ecuador.

== Description ==
The adult male frog measures 19.0 to 25.8 mm in snout-vent length and the adult female frog 21.3 to 28.9 mm. The skin of the dorsum shows cryptic coloration: It is black or dark brown in color. There are lighter lines down the sides of the frog's body. Adult male frogs have brown throats and chests with white marks. Adult female frogs have cream or blurry brown marks. The adult male frog has a white belly with brown marks. The female frog has a cream-white belly.

== Etymology ==
Scientists named this frog yasuni for the place where it was first described: Parque Nacional Yasuní.

== Habitat ==
Scientists observed this frog between 200 and 1095 meters above sea level in the Amazon Basin and the east side of the Andes Mountains. It lives in tropical forests, where it has been found near streams with rocky bottoms. This frog is diurnal.

The frog's known range includes several protected parks: Parque Nacional Cayambe Coca, Parque Nacional Yasuní, Parque Nacional Sumaco Napo-Galeras, Reserva de Producción Faunística Cuyabeno, and Reserva Biológica Limoncocha.

== Reproduction ==
The male frog perches on or near rocks and calls to the female frogs. He will jump back into the water if disturbed but returns to the same perch within a few hours. The female frog lays eggs on the leaf litter. The male frog watches the eggs until they hatch. After they hatch, the adult male frog carries the frog to streams. Scientists saw one male frogs of this species with 13 tadpoles on his back at the same time.

The tadpole is translucent-brown in color There are two light marks on either side of the mouth.

== Threats ==
The IUCN classifies this frog as least concern, but there may be some local threats associated with logging, cattle ranching, and agriculture.

== Original description ==
- Paez-Vacas MI; Coloma LA; Santos JC (2010). "Systematics of the Hyloxalus bocagei complex (Anura: Dendrobatidae), description of two new cryptic species, and recognition of H. maculosus". Zootaxa. 2111: 1–75.
