= Hyloxalus vergeli =

Conservation status
- Vulnerable (IUCN 3.1)

Scientific classification
- Kingdom: Animalia
- Phylum: Chordata
- Class: Amphibia
- Order: Anura
- Family: Dendrobatidae
- Genus: Hyloxalus
- Species: H. vergeli

Binomial name
- Hyloxalus vergeli Hellmich, 1940

Synonyms
- Colostethus vergeli (Hellmich, 1940)

Species of frog

Hyloxalus vergeli is a species of frog in the family Dendrobatidae. It is endemic to Colombia and only known from the region of its type locality in the Cundinamarca Department, Colombia.

== Habitat ==
Its natural habitats are cloud forests near streams. It tolerates some minor habitat disturbance. This frog has been observed between 520 and 2100 meters above sea level.

This frog's range includes many protected parks, including La Tribuna.

== Life cycle ==
This frog has exhibited some burrowing behavior. It mates during the rainy season. The female frog lays eggs on the ground. After the eggs hatch, the male adult frog carries the tadpoles to water.

== Threats ==
The IUCN classifies this frog as vulnerable to extinction due to its small range and habitat loss in favor of urbanization and agriculture. The type locality is entirely enclosed by a city that has lost all its forest cover.
