= Siete Iglesias Municipal Ecological Conservation Area =

Municipal park in Morona Santiago, Ecuador

- Área Ecológica de Conservacíon Siete Iglesias
- IUCN category VI (protected area with sustainable use of natural resources)
- Interactive map of Siete Iglesias Municipal Ecological Conservation Area
- Location: Morona Santiago, Ecuador
- Nearest city: San Juan Bosco
- Coordinates: 3°06′S 78°36′W
- Area: 160.29 km^{2} (61.89 sq mi)
- Established: 2006
- Governing body: Ministerio del Ambiente (Ministry of the Environment)

Siete Iglesias Municipal Ecological Conservation Area or Área Ecológica de Conservacíon Siete Iglesias is a national park in Morona Santiago, Ecuador. It serves as a conservation area with some tourism. The park is named for one of its higher mountains, "Siete Igelsias", or "seven churches". The park consists principally of cloud forest between 1140 and 3840 meters above sea level.

The hills and mountains in Siete Iglesias are very steep, so it sees few human visitors. The park's purpose is conservation and the preservation of natural springs. There are some hiking trails where visitors can camp, hike, and take photographs. The two largest mountains in the park are Siete Igelesias and Pan de Azúcar, or "Sugarloaf". Farmers who moved near the park in the mid-1900s named the mountain Pan de Azúcar after a kind of bread. Pan de Azúcar is noted as a difficult climb.

The Shuar indigenous people used to live in the area that is now the park.

Some scientists report that parks as small as Siete Iglesias do not serve much conservation purpose alone. However, if incorporated together into a conservation corridor, they might have a more pronounced effect.
