= Marco Antonio Serna Díaz =

- Born: July 11, 1936; San Vicente Ferrer, Antioquia, Colombia
- Died: December 31, 1991; Ayapel, Colombia
- Citizenship: Colombian
- Scientific career
- Fields: Ornithology, Herpetology
- Workplaces: University of Antioquia
- Author abbrev. (zoology): Serna or Serna D.

Marco Antonio Serna Díaz (11 July 1936 – 31 December 1991) was a Colombian herpetologist, ornithologist, and naturalist. He was a curator of ornithological and herpetological collections and taught ornithology at the University of Antioquia.

== Life ==
Serna was born to Marco Antonio Serna and Anna Judith Díaz in San Vicente Ferrer, Antioquia, Colombia. On 20 June 1950, he entered the Institute of the Brothers of the Christian Schools in San Pedro, Antioquia, where he developed an interest in the natural sciences. From 1956 to 1958, he studied in San Antonio de Prado. On 10 January 1962, he made his perpetual profession with the Institute of the Brothers of the Christian Schools.

In 1970, Serna became director of the Museo de Ciencias Naturales of the Colegio de San José de La Salle in Medellín, where he developed his career as a naturalist and promoted the study of birds in the region. He also served as curator of birds, amphibians, and reptiles and taught ornithology at the University of Antioquia.

Serna co-founded the Sociedad Antioqueña de Ornitología in 1984 and later served as its president. He also served as president of the Asociación Colombiana de Ornitología.

Together with Puerto Rican herpetologist Juan Arturo Rivero, Serna described several frog species, including Pristimantis dorsopictus, Pristimantis johannesdei, Hyloxalus breviquartus, Pseudopaludicola ceratophryes, and Colostethus ramirezi.

In 1971, Serna collected an adult male specimen of the Antioquia brush finch (Atlapetes blancae) at San Pedro, Antioquia. The specimen was later designated as a paratype when the species was formally described in 2007.

In 2012, the newly described Antioquia wren (Thryophilus sernai) was named in his honour. The describing authors noted his contributions to ornithological and herpetological research in Antioquia and his role in founding the Sociedad Antioqueña de Ornitología.

In 1984, Rivero described the frog Eleutherodactylus sernai in Serna's honour; the taxon was later synonymized with Eleutherodactylus cerastes.
