= Marcos Jiménez de la Espada =

Spanish zoologist, explorer, writer (1831–1898)

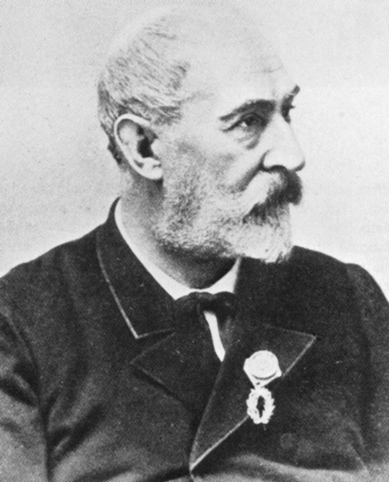
Marcos Jiménez de la Espada

Marcos Jiménez de la Espada (1831–1898) was a Spanish zoologist, herpetologist, explorer and writer, born in Cartagena, Spain, although he spent most of his life in Madrid, where he died. He is known for participating in the Pacific Scientific Commission, with whom he traveled America from 1862 to 1865. He also published several works on geography and history of the American continent.

== Biography ==
The son of a politician, Jiménez de la Espada had to move several times during his childhood and youth, studying in Valladolid, Barcelona and Sevilla.

In 1850, he started a career in Natural Sciences in the Universidad Complutense de Madrid, finishing five years later with the work "The Blainville Amphibians and the Cuvier Batracians form a class apart". The study and taxonomy of the amphibians would be a recurring theme in his scientific work afterwards.

Two years after earning his degree, he got his first job as an assistant in the Natural history department of the university. He also got another job in 1857, also as an assistant, in the Natural Science Museum of the Court (now Natural Science Museum of Madrid.) In both cases, his research work (which lasted 7 years) centered on zoology and comparative anatomy. However, it must be said that his positions at the museum were never very important (except at the end of his life), due to the fall from grace of his teacher and advisor, Mariano de la Paz Graells, in 1867.

== Scientific work ==
=== Zoology ===
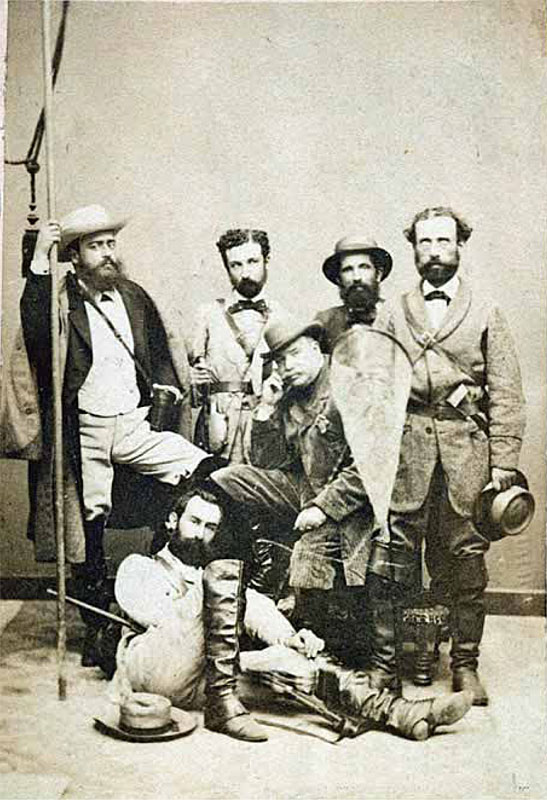
Members of the Scientific Commission of the Pacific (Marcos Jiménez de la Espada sitting on the floor) c. 1862–1865.

During all his American adventure, Jiménez de la Espada collected many kinds of animals that he not only studied, but also sent alive to Madrid. Before going on the expedition he worked several years in the preparation of foreign animals in the Botanical Garden of Madrid, always under Graells's tutelage. With the acquired experience, it was not hard for him to do the same with the many species of mammals, birds, and reptiles that, until then, had never been taken to Europe. (These include mara of Patagonia, the South American condor, and the guanaco.) Many descendants of this animals would later be given to European zoos, which would garner Jiménez the First Class Medal of Mammal Division by the Société impériale zoologique d'acclimatation of France, on 23 March 1866.

He spent six years dedicated exclusively to the study and re-ordering of materials collected during the expedition, which he would include in his future works. In 1870, he published the article Some new and curious facts about the Amazonian fauna in a bulletin of the Universidad de Madrid. In this work, he described, among other things, the appearance and behavior of the Thyroptera albiventer bat. In 1871, he published the report Unknown Species of Neo-tropical Fauna in the Lisbon Science Academy Journal, and that same year he founded, along with other colleagues, the Spanish Society of Natural History, where he would publish most of his further works.

He was already a well-known author in Europe when he published his greatest work in the field of zoology: Vertebrados del viaje al Pacifico. Batracios (Batrachians: Vertebrates from the trip to the Pacific), written after the exhaustive study of 786 species collected during his trip. In the work, published in 1875 and re-printed in 1978, he described a total of 18 genera and species already known, as well as 2 genera, 12 species and 3 subspecies previously unknown at that time. The article not only described the species from an anatomical point of view, but also covered their biology and behavior. Most known is his conclusion about the frog Rhinoderma darwinii, for which he debated the erroneous idea that its gestation process occurred in its mouth, as opposed to laying eggs which it later incubated in its mouth, as he proved. This complex study is considered, nowadays, a classic in zoological literature.

=== Geography, history, and anthropology ===
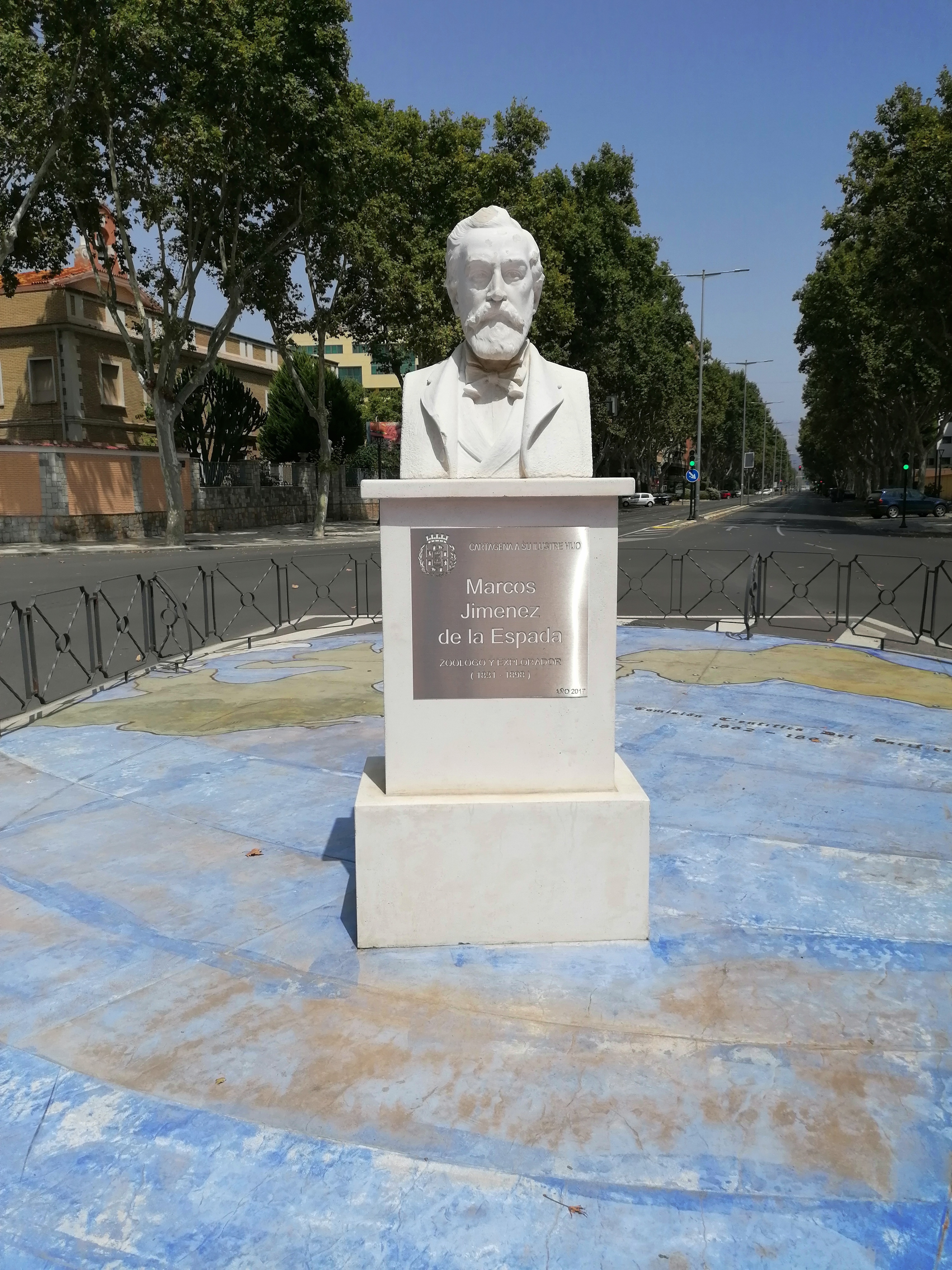
Bust of Marcos Jimenez de la Espada in his birthplace Cartagena

Despite being at the climax of his zoologist prestige, Jiménez de la Espada put his scientific work at hold and devoted himself to the study of geography and American history. In 1876, he founded the Geographic Society of Madrid, and in 1883, he entered the History Academy. From there, he directed the re-edition of works of great medieval and modern travelers like Pero Tafur and the Jesuit, Bernabé Cobo, and the works of pre-Hispanic Peru from Pedro Cieza de León and Bartolomé de las Casas. From 1881 to 1897 he published four volumes of his work Geographic Relations of the Indies, which garnered him the Loubat prize from the History Academy. In 1882 he was elected a member of the American Antiquarian Society.

He participated in congresses in Brussels, Madrid, Turín, Berlin and Paris. His work in favor of the divulgation of the Inca culture won him the Gold Medal from the Government of Peru. He was also made a member of various international societies. In 1895, he was named president of the Spanish Society of Natural History, which he founded.

Curiously, he did not present his doctoral thesis until April 1898, three months before he was named cathedratic of comparative anatomy and six months before his death. His death truncated the ample study that he was preparing about the maritime expedition of Alessandro Malaspina in the 18th century. Francisco Giner de los Ríos and other friends presented him as a symbol of Spanish scientific regenerationism during a posthumous ceremony in his honor.
