= William Edward Duellman =

American herpetologist (1930–2022)

- Born: September 6, 1930
- Died: February 25, 2022 (aged 91)
- Known for: Taxonomy and systematics of amphibians, especially Neotropical frogs
- Scientific career
- Fields: Zoology, Herpetology

William Edward Duellman (September 6, 1930 – February 25, 2022) was an American zoologist and herpetologist who specialized in the study of amphibians. He was one of the most influential figures in Neotropical amphibian systematics during the second half of the 20th century.

== Life and career ==
Duellman graduated from the University of Michigan in 1956. He spent the majority of his academic career at the University of Kansas, where he served as Curator Emeritus of the Division of Herpetology. His research focused primarily on the diversity, systematics, and biogeography of Neotropical amphibians, particularly frogs of Central and South America.

From the 1960s through the 1980s, Duellman collaborated extensively with John Douglas Lynch in the description of numerous species originally placed in the genus Eleutherodactylus, many of which were later transferred to the genus Pristimantis. He was married to the zoologist Linda Trueb.

== Taxa named in his honor ==
- Phyllodactylus duellmani Dixon, 1960
- Anolis duellmani Fitch & Henderson, 1973
- Pristimantis duellmani (Lynch, 1980)
- Phyllomedusa duellmani Cannatella, 1982
- Duellmania Dubois, 1987
- Duellmanohyla Campbell & Smith, 1992
- Ranitomeya duellmani (Schulte, 1999)
- Noblella duellmani (Lehr, Aguilar & Lundberg, 2004)
- Ceuthomantis duellmani Barrio-Amorós, 2010
- Cnemidophorus duellmani McCranie & Hedges, 2013

== Selected taxa described ==
- Agalychnis annae (Duellman, 1963)
- Allobates craspedoceps (Duellman, 2004)
- Atelopus onorei Coloma, Lötters, Duellman & Miranda-Leiva, 2007
- Bolitoglossa compacta Wake, Brame & Duellman, 1973
- Bryophryne Hedges, Duellman & Heinicke, 2008
- Centrolene heloderma (Duellman, 1981)
- Craugastoridae Hedges, Duellman & Heinicke, 2008
- Duellmanohyla ignicolor (Duellman, 1961)
- Gastrotheca dendronastes Duellman, 1983
- Hyloscirtus larinopygion (Duellman, 1973)
- Hyloxalus pulcherrimus (Duellman, 2004)
- Isthmohyla graceae (Myers & Duellman, 1982)
- Nymphargus anomalus (Lynch & Duellman, 1973)
- Oreobates saxatilis (Duellman, 1990)
- Phrynopus thompsoni Duellman, 2000
- Pristimantis danae (Duellman, 1978)
- Psychrophrynella Hedges, Duellman & Heinicke, 2008
- Rulyrana flavopunctata (Lynch & Duellman, 1973)
- Scarthyla Duellman & de Sá, 1988
