= Juan A. Rivero =

Puerto Rican biologist (1923–2014)

Dr. Juan Arturo Rivero Quintero (March 5, 1923 in Santurce, Puerto Rico – March 3, 2014) was a Puerto Rican biologist who founded the Dr. Juan A. Rivero Zoo at the University of Puerto Rico's Mayagüez Campus.

== Education ==
Dr. Rivero obtained a Bachelor of Science in Agronomy from the University of Puerto Rico at Mayagüez in 1945. In 1942, he joined the Beta-Activo chapter of Phi Sigma Alpha fraternity. In 1951, he obtained an M.S. from Harvard University, followed by a Ph.D. from that same institution in 1953.

== Academic career ==
After obtaining his bachelor's degree, Rivero served as an assistant plant physiologist, instructor, assistant professor and associate professor before becoming a full professor of biology at UPR-Mayagüez in 1958. In 1950, he participated in the expedition to the Upper Orinoco, which will serve as the basis for his doctoral studies. After founding the UPR-Mayagüez Zoo in 1954, he served as its first director, as well as founder and director of the UPR's Institute of Marine Biology. From 1959 to 1960 he served as director of the Biology Department and from 1962 to 1966, as dean of arts and sciences, oversaw the work of over 200 faculty members and a two million dollar annual budget. Between 1966 and 1968, he served as a research associate at Harvard University and visiting scientist at the Venezuelan Institute of Scientific Investigation.

== Other accomplishments ==
In addition to founding the Mayagüez Zoo, Puerto Rico's only zoological garden, it was named after him in 1998.

He discovered over a hundred animal species, particularly amphibians and reptiles. He was the founder and first president of the Puerto Rico Zoological Society, as well as of the Association of Island Marine Laboratories.

In addition to writing over 200 papers and articles, he wrote numerous books, including:

Los coquíes de Puerto Rico
El Coquí Dorado de Puerto Rico y otras Ranas de Hábitos Reproductivos Peculiares
Anfibios y Reptiles de Puerto Rico
Anfibios y Reptiles de Nuestro Folklore
Los Machos, las Hembras y los Intersexos
Biología del Sexo
Principios de Evolución Orgánica
Los Helechos Cuernos de Alce o Platicerios
Salientia de Venezuela
Expedición de la UPR a las Selvas del Alto Orinoco 1950
El Dolor de la Espalda Baja

He wrote the Phi Sigma Alpha "Brindis" or toast.

== Species named after Dr. Rivero ==
Several species have been named to honor Dr. Rivero's contributions to science, including:

Geomelania riveroi Clench (snail)
Hemitrochus riveroi Turner (snail)
Glomeridesmus riveroi Chamberlin (miriapod)
Ballophilus riveroi Chamberlin (miriapod)
Prestherapis riveroi Donoso-Barros (frog)
Atractus riveroi Roze (snake)
Hyla riveroi Cochran & Goin (frog)
Processa riveroi Manning & Chace (crustacean)
Leptodactylus riveroi Heyer (frog)
Marshallela riveroi Ramos (treehopper)
Eleutherodactylus juanariveroi Ríos-López & Thomas (frog)

== See also ==
- Category:Taxa named by Juan A. Rivero
- List of Puerto Ricans
- Puerto Rican scientists and inventors
