= List of recently extinct amphibians =

- Extinct in the wild (EW): 2 species
- Critically endangered (CR): 825 species
- Endangered (EN): 1,291 species
- Vulnerable (VU): 815 species
- Near threatened (NT): 453 species
- Least concern (LC): 3,733 species
- Data deficient (DD): 896 species
Amphibian species (IUCN, 2025-2)
- 8052 extant species have been evaluated
- 7156 of those are fully assessed (Note: excludes data deficient evaluations.)
- 4186 are not threatened at present (Note: NT and LC.)
- 2931 to 3827 are threatened (Note: Threatened comprises CR, EN and VU. Upper estimate additionally includes DD.)
- 35 to 148 are extinct or extinct in the wild:
  - 37 extinct (EX) species (Note: Chart omits extinct (EX) species)
  - 2 extinct in the wild (EW)

The International Union for Conservation of Nature (IUCN) lists 37 extinct species, 187 possibly extinct species, two extinct in the wild species, and one possibly extinct in the wild species of amphibians.

== Salamanders ==
Extinct species

- Yunnan lake newt (Hypselotriton wolterstorffi)
- Ainsworth's salamander (Plethodon ainsworthi)
- Jalpa false brook salamander (Pseudoeurycea exspectata)

Possibly extinct species

- Admirable false brook salamander (Aquiloeurycea praecellens)
- Bolitoglossa nussbaumi
- Tlapacoyan salamander (Chiropterotriton casasi)
- Oedipina petiola
- Anita's false brook salamander (Pseudoeurycea anitae)
- Aquatic salamander (Pseudoeurycea aquatica)
- Brown false brook salamander (Pseudoeurycea brunnata)
- Teotepec salamander (Pseudoeurycea teotepec)
- Claw-toothed salamander (Pseudoeurycea unguidentis)
- Long-tailed minute salamander (Thorius longicaudus)

== Frogs ==
Extinct species

- Chiriqui harlequin frog (Atelopus chiriquiensis)
- Pass stubfoot toad (Atelopus senex)
- Maracay harlequin frog (Atelopus vogli)
- Campo Grande tree frog (Boana cymbalum)
- Corquin robber frog (Craugastor anciano)
- Craugastor myllomyllon
- Sierra de Omoa streamside frog (Craugastor omoaensis)
- Golden toad (Incilius periglenes)
- Vegas Valley leopard frog (Lithobates fisheri)
- Gunther's streamlined frog (Nannophrys guentheri)
- Splendid poison frog (Oophaga speciosa)
- Spiny-knee leaf frog (Phrynomedusa fimbriata)
- Sri Lanka bubble-nest frog (Pseudophilautus adsperus)
- Pseudophilautus dimbullae
- Pseudophilautus eximius
- Pseudophilautus extirpo
- Pseudophilautus halyi
- Whitenose bubble-nest frog (Pseudophilautus leucorhinchus)
- Pseudophilautus maia
- Pseudophilautus malcolmsmithi
- Pseudophilautus nanus
- Sharp-nosed bush frog (Pseudophilautus nasutus)
- Pseudophilautus oxyrhynchus
- Pseudophilautus pardus
- Pseudophilautus rugatus
- Pseudophilautus temporalis
- Variable bush frog (Pseudophilautus variabilis)
- Pseudophilautus zal
- Pseudophilautus zimmeri
- Mountain mist frog (Ranoidea nyakalensis)
- Southern gastric brooding frog (Rheobatrachus silus)
- Eungella gastric-brooding frog (Rheobatrachus vitellinus)
- Sharp snouted day frog (Taudactylus acutirostris)
- Mount Glorious day frog (Taudactylus diurnus)

Possibly extinct species

- Allobates mcdiarmidi
- Llanos rocket frog (Allobates ranoides)
- Osgood's Ethiopian toad (Altiphrynoides osgoodi)
- Collins' poison frog (Andinobates abditus)
- Green poison frog (Andinobates viridis)
- White-dotted rocket frog (Aromobates alboguttatus)
- Aromobates haydeeae
- Leopard rocket frog (Aromobates leopardalis)
- Skunk frog (Aromobates nocturnus)
- Sierra rocket frog (Aromobates serranus)
- Du Toit's torrent frog (Arthroleptides dutoiti)
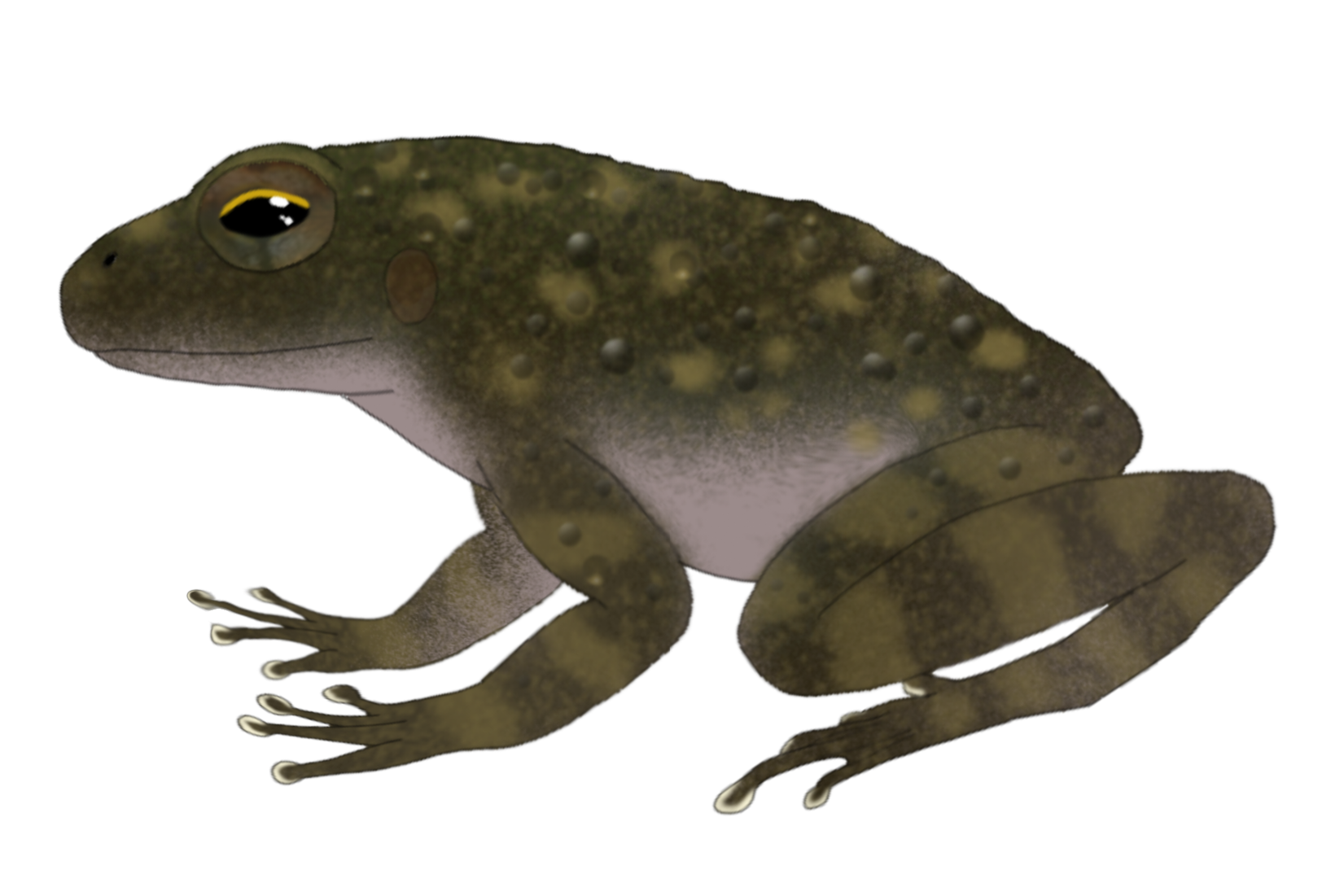
  Du Toit's torrent frog
- Overlooked squeaker frog (Arthroleptis kutogundua)
- Cave squeaker (Arthroleptis troglodytes)
- Angelito stubfoot toad (Atelopus angelito)
- Atelopus ardila
- Venezuelan yellow frog (Atelopus carbonerensis)
- Atelopus chocoensis
- Huila stubfoot toad (Atelopus ebenoides)
- Carabaya stubfoot toad (Atelopus erythropus)
- Malvasa stubfoot toad (Atelopus eusebianus)
- Atelopus eusebiodiazi
- Forest stubfoot toad (Atelopus farci)
- Atelopus gigas
- Guanujo stubfoot toad (Atelopus guanujo)
- Morona-Santiago stubfoot toad (Atelopus halihelos)
- Atelopus lynchi
- Mindo harlequin frog (Atelopus mindoensis)
- Colombian stubfoot toad (Atelopus minutulus)
- Atelopus monohernandezii
- Niceforo's stubfoot toad (Atelopus nicefori)
- Atelopus onorei
- Atelopus orcesi
- Rednose stubfoot toad (Atelopus oxyrhynchus)
- Schmidt's stubfoot toad (Atelopus pachydermus)
- Atelopus pastuso
- San Isidro stubfoot toad (Atelopus pedimarmoratus)
- Peru stubfoot toad (Atelopus peruensis)
- Atelopus petersi
- Atelopus petriruizi
- Painted stubfoot toad (Atelopus pictiventris)
- Green and red venter harlequin toad (Atelopus pinangoi)
- Flat-spined atelopus (Atelopus planispina)
- Atelopus podocarpus
- Atelopus quimbaya
- Atelopus sernai
- Atelopus simulatus
- Atelopus sonsonensis
- Scarlet harlequin toad (Atelopus sorianoi)
- Bogota stubfoot toad (Atelopus subornatus)
- Izecksohn's treefrog (Bokermannohyla izecksohni)
- Pacific giant glass frog (Centrolene geckoideum)
- Amazon giant glass frog (Centrolene pipilata)
- Craugastor adamastus
- Atlantic robber frog (Craugastor andi)
- Craugastor catalinae
- Mccranie's robber frog (Craugastor chrysozetetes)
- Cruz robber frog (Craugastor cruzi)
- Craugastor epochthidius
- Nombre de Dios streamside frog (Craugastor fecundus)
- San Pedro robber frog (Craugastor merendonensis)
- Craugastor olanchano
- Ghost flesh-bellied frog (Craugastor phasma)
- Bob's robber frog (Craugastor punctariolus)
- Craugastor rhyacobatrachus
- Craugastor saltuarius
- Craugastor trachydermus
- Bocourt's tree frog (Dryophytes bocourti)
- Oaxacan fringe-limbed treefrog (Ecnomiohyla echinata)
- Rabbs' fringe-limbed treefrog (Ecnomiohyla rabborum)
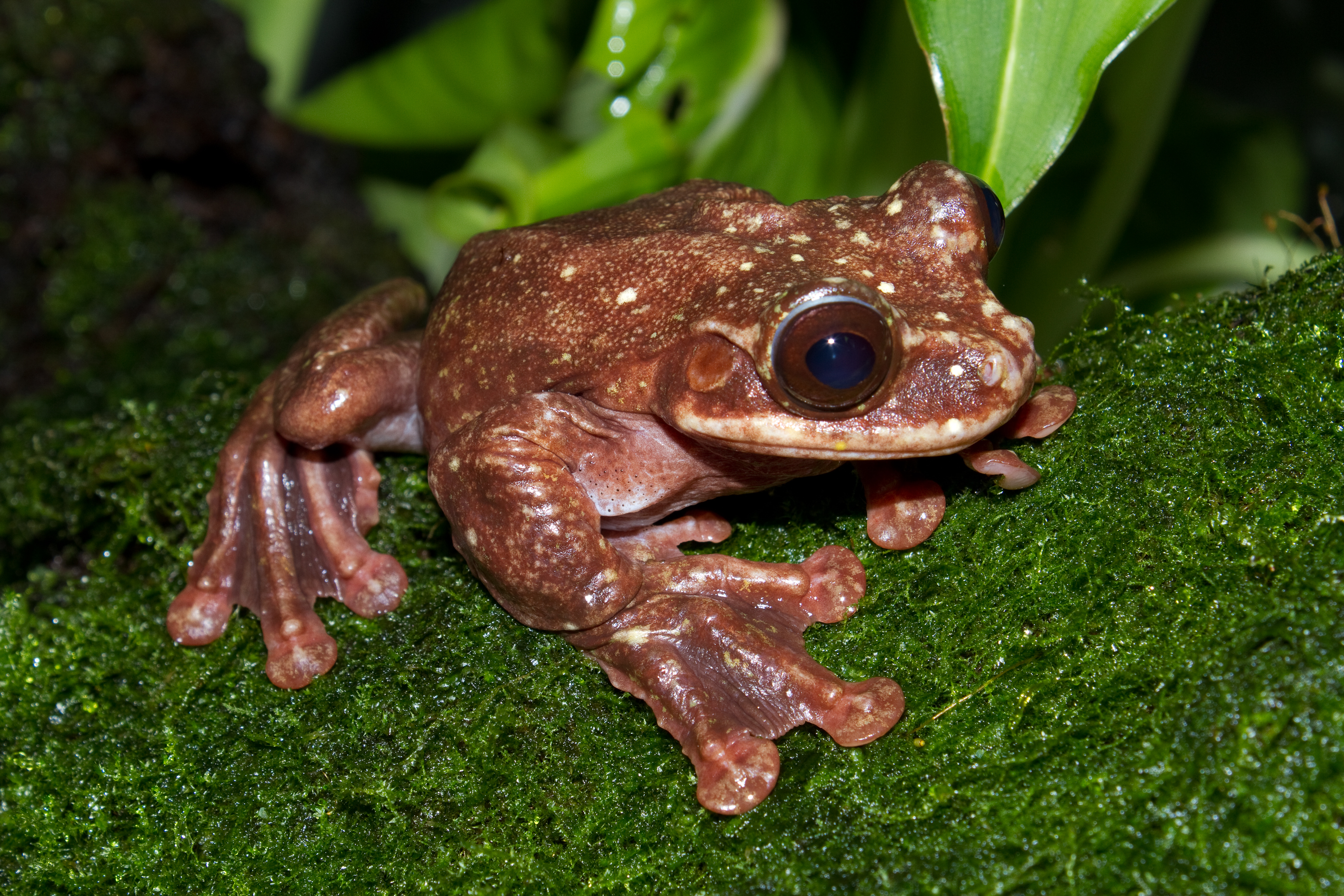
  Rabbs' fringe-limbed treefrog
- Ectopoglossus atopoglossus
- Eneida's coquí (Eleutherodactylus eneidae)
- La Visite robber frog (Eleutherodactylus glanduliferoides)
- Golden coquí (Eleutherodactylus jasperi)
- Web-footed coquí (Eleutherodactylus karlschmidti)
- Arntully robber frog (Eleutherodactylus orcutti)
- Schmidt's robber frog (Eleutherodactylus schmidti)
- Foothill robber frog (Eleutherodactylus semipalmatus)
- Pacific marsupial frog (Gastrotheca angustifrons)
- Gastrotheca antomia
- La Siberia marsupial frog (Gastrotheca lauzuricae)
- Itatiaia highland frog (Holoaden bradei)
- Parjacti treefrog (Hyloscirtus chlorosteus)
- Bello rocket frog (Hyloxalus abditaurantius)
- Edwards' rocket frog (Hyloxalus edwardsi)
- Ruiz's rocket frog (Hyloxalus ruizi)
- Pico Blanco toad (Incilius fastidiosus)
- Chief's toad (Incilius majordomus)
- Isthmohyla calypsa
- Puebla frog (Lithobates pueblae)
- Tlaloc's leopard frog (Lithobates tlaloci)
- Yellow-spotted tree frog (Litoria castanea)
- Peppered tree frog (Litoria piperata)
- Melanophryniscus peritus
- Paramo toad (Nannophryne cophotis)
- Poynton's forest toad (Nectophrynoides poyntoni)
- Trueb's cochran frog (Nymphargus truebae)
- Amani forest frog (Parhoplophryne usambarica)
- La Planada poison frog (Paruwrobates andinus)
- Hispaniolan crestless toad (Peltophryne fluviatica)
- Jacobson's bubble-nest frog (Philautus jacobsoni)
- Manengouba river frog (Phrynobatrachus manengoubensis)
- Lake Oku puddle frog (Phrynobatrachus njiomock)
- Plectrohyla pycnochila
- Pristimantis albericoi
- Aragua robber frog (Pristimantis anotis)
- Argelia robber frog (Pristimantis bernali)
- Uribe robber frog (Pristimantis molybrignus)
- Sugar robber frog (Pristimantis phragmipleuron)
- Botucatu escuerzo (Proceratophrys moratoi)
- Dunn's rocket frog (Prostherapis dunni)
- Chevron-spotted brown frog (Rana chevronta)
- Rhinella chrysophora
- Mesopotamia beaked toad (Rhinella rostrata)
- Chile Darwin's frog (Rhinoderma rufum)
- Cerro Pelón tree frog (Sarcohyla calvicollina)
- Puebla tree frog (Sarcohyla charadricola)
- Blue-eyed aquatic tree frog (Sarcohyla cyanomma)
- Semiaquatic tree frog (Sarcohyla pachyderma)
- Speckled tree frog (Sarcohyla psarosema)
- Sierra Juarez tree frog (Sarcohyla sabrina)
- Voiceless tree frog (Sarcohyla siopela)
- Piebald alpine toad (Scutiger maculatus)
- Nutibara rober frog (Strabomantis cadenai)
- Mindo robber frog (Strabomantis necerus)
- Telmatobius bolivianus
- Telmatobius ceiorum
- Loja water frog (Telmatobius cirrhacelis)
- Telmatobius edaphonastes
- Telmatobius espadai
- Telmatobius laticeps
- Telmatobius mendelsoni
- Black water frog (Telmatobius niger)
- Arica water frog (Telmatobius pefauri)
- Telmatobius sibiricus
- Vellard's water frog (Telmatobius vellardi)

Extinct in the wild species

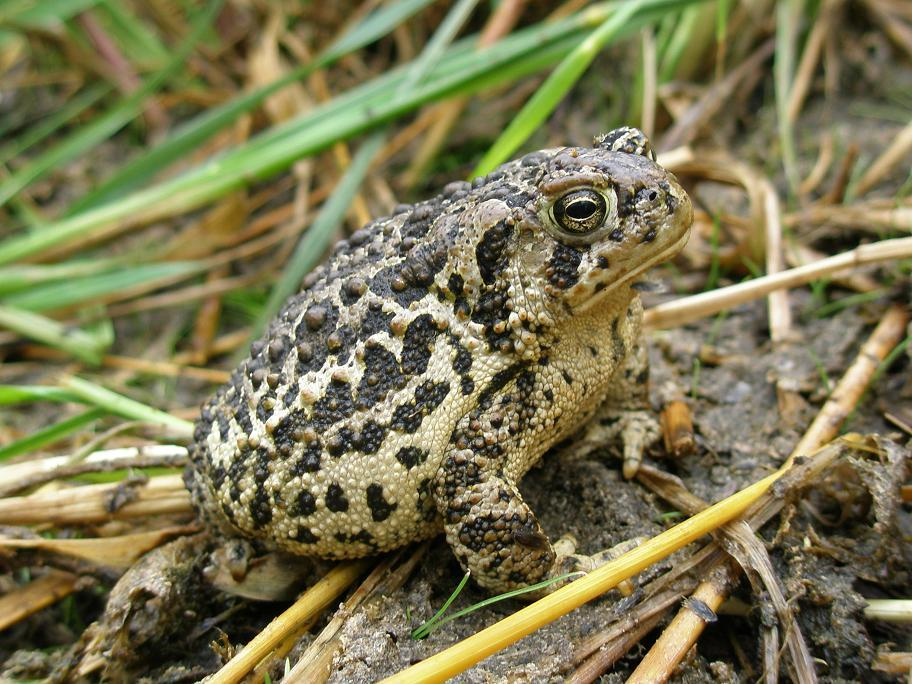
Wyoming toad

- Wyoming toad (Anaxyrus baxteri)
- Longnose stubfoot toad (Atelopus longirostris)
- Kihansi spray toad (Nectophrynoides asperginis)

== See also ==
- List of least concern amphibians
- List of near threatened amphibians
- List of vulnerable amphibians
- List of endangered amphibians
- List of critically endangered amphibians
- List of data deficient amphibians
