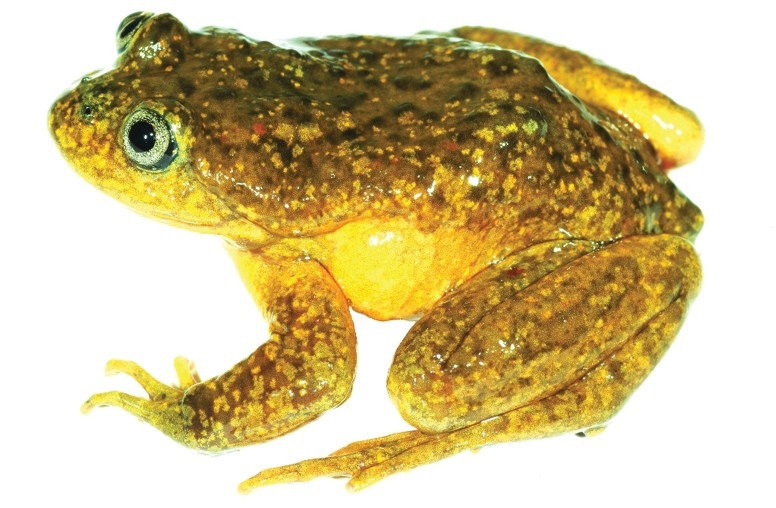
- Holotype male from Huaytará Province in 2012

Conservation status
- Critically Endangered (IUCN 3.1)

Scientific classification
- Kingdom: Animalia
- Phylum: Chordata
- Class: Amphibia
- Order: Anura
- Family: Telmatobiidae
- Genus: Telmatobius
- Species: T. ventriflavum

Binomial name
- Telmatobius ventriflavum Catenazzi, Vargas García & Lehr, 2015

= Telmatobius ventriflavum =

Species of amphibian

Telmatobius ventriflavum, the Andean Water Frog, is a species of water frogs from the western Andes in Peru.

== Etymology ==
The specific name is taken from the Latin words venter ("belly"), and flavus ("yellow"), referring to the coloration of the species' ventral surfaces.

== Discovery ==
Specimens of the species were discovered in October 2012, during a survey conducted for the Smithsonian Conservation Biology Institute. The population was described as a new species, separate from the nearby Telmatobius intermedius and T. rimac, in the journal ZooKeys in February 2015.

The discovery of the species was unusual, in that the surrounding area is generally considered "species-poor", and already has two species of Telmatobius frogs nearby (T. rimac 200 kilometres (120 mi) to the north and T. intermedius 170 kilometres (110 mi) to the south). Furthermore, the type locality is easily accessible, being in proximity to the highway that connects the city of Ayacucho with the Pan-American Highway.

== Description ==
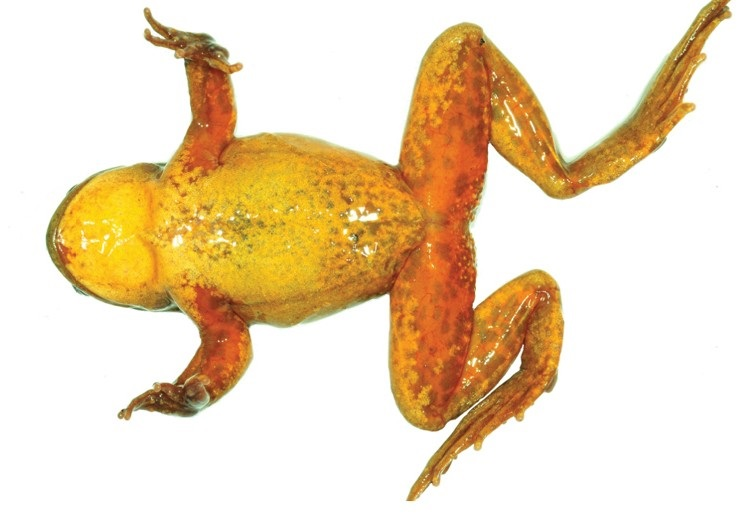

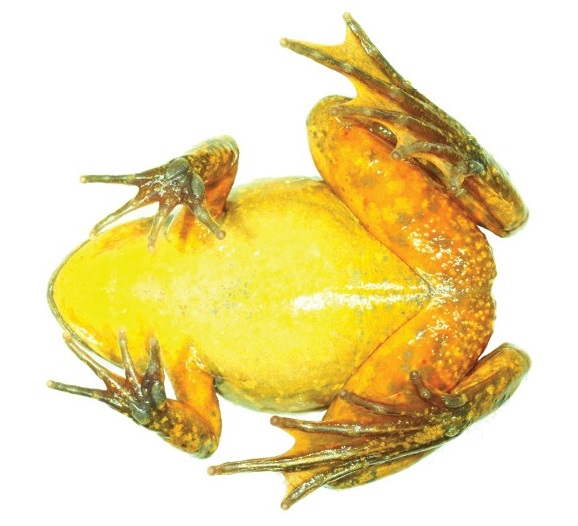
Two images showing the difference in ventral coloration between a male specimen (top) and female (bottom)

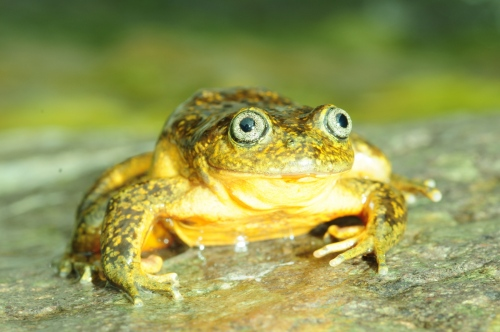
Anterior view

The species is slender. Females measure 49.3–55.7 millimetres (1.94–2.19 in) in length and weigh 11.5–19.7 grams (0.41–0.69 oz), while males measure approximately 48.5 millimetres (1.91 in) and weigh 13.6 grams (0.48 oz). The head is flat, wider than long, and makes up slightly more than 30% of the body length. T. ventriflavum has large eyes and a rounded snout; the tongue is rounded and the species lacks vocal slits.

T. ventriflavum lacks webbing on its fingers but has webbing on its toes. Its skin is smooth both ventrally (below) and dorsally (above), but the back is patterned with miniature pustules.

Coloration on the dorsal portion of the body ranges from light golden-yellow to golden-tan, with dark brown, golden-yellow, and red mottling. The sides are tan yellow, fading into golden-yellow or marigold on the throat and belly with depigmented areas on the chest. Coloration of the limbs varies between sexes: in males the ventral surface is bright marigold or orange colored, whereas in females it tends to be either golden-yellow or light marigold. The species has thin turquoise rings around the eyes, which are light grey in color.

== Range and habitat ==
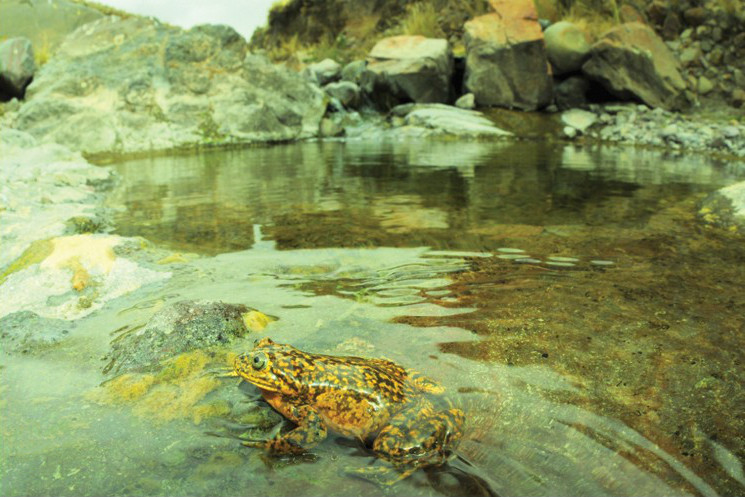
T. ventriflavum's natural habitat

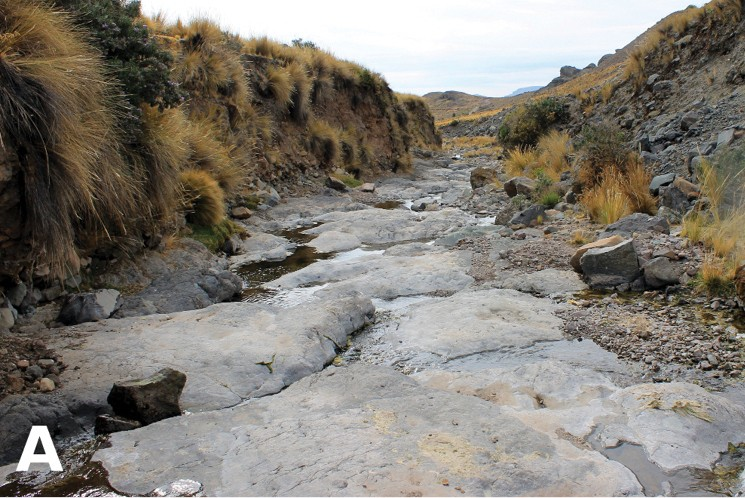

The species is found around elevations of 3,900 metres (12,800 ft) (possibly up to 4,300 metres (14,100 ft)) on the Pacific (western) slopes of the Andes in Peru. Specimens have only been collected from a single locality, a stream that drains into the Huaytará river, a tributary of the Pisco river. The surrounding area is sparse, arid Puna grassland. Most rainfall occurs between January and March.

T. ventriflavum was found in a small stream, approximately 10 metres (33 ft) wide. The stream alternates between gravel- and pebble-bedded pools and small waterfalls and riffles.

The species' range is restricted by the surrounding environment, which is arid and limits dispersal.

== Reproduction ==
The species is believed to have an extended breeding period, with the developmental stages of captured tadpoles suggesting that it even breeds during the dry period.

== Threats ==
T. ventriflavum's habitat is truncated by a dam and reservoir 500 metres (1,600 ft) downstream of the type locality. The construction of pipelines and roads are also a threat, as is water contamination stemming from nearby mining and agriculture.

The species has also been observed to be infected with the pathogenic chytrid fungus Batrachochytrium dendrobatidis, which causes the disease chytridiomycosis. Infection rates were approximately 40.0% among mature specimens and 53.5% among tadpoles. B. dendrobatidis has had catastrophic effects on other Telmatobius species throughout the Andes region of South America: the extinction of three species from Ecuador has been linked to chytridiomycosis outbreaks, as has the decline of T. marmoratus and T. timens from Peru and three species from Argentina. T. jelskii from Peru and T. gigas from Bolivia have also been affected by the fungus.
