= Cordillera Central páramo =

Ecoregion in the Andes Mountains

Cordillera Central páramo (NT1004)
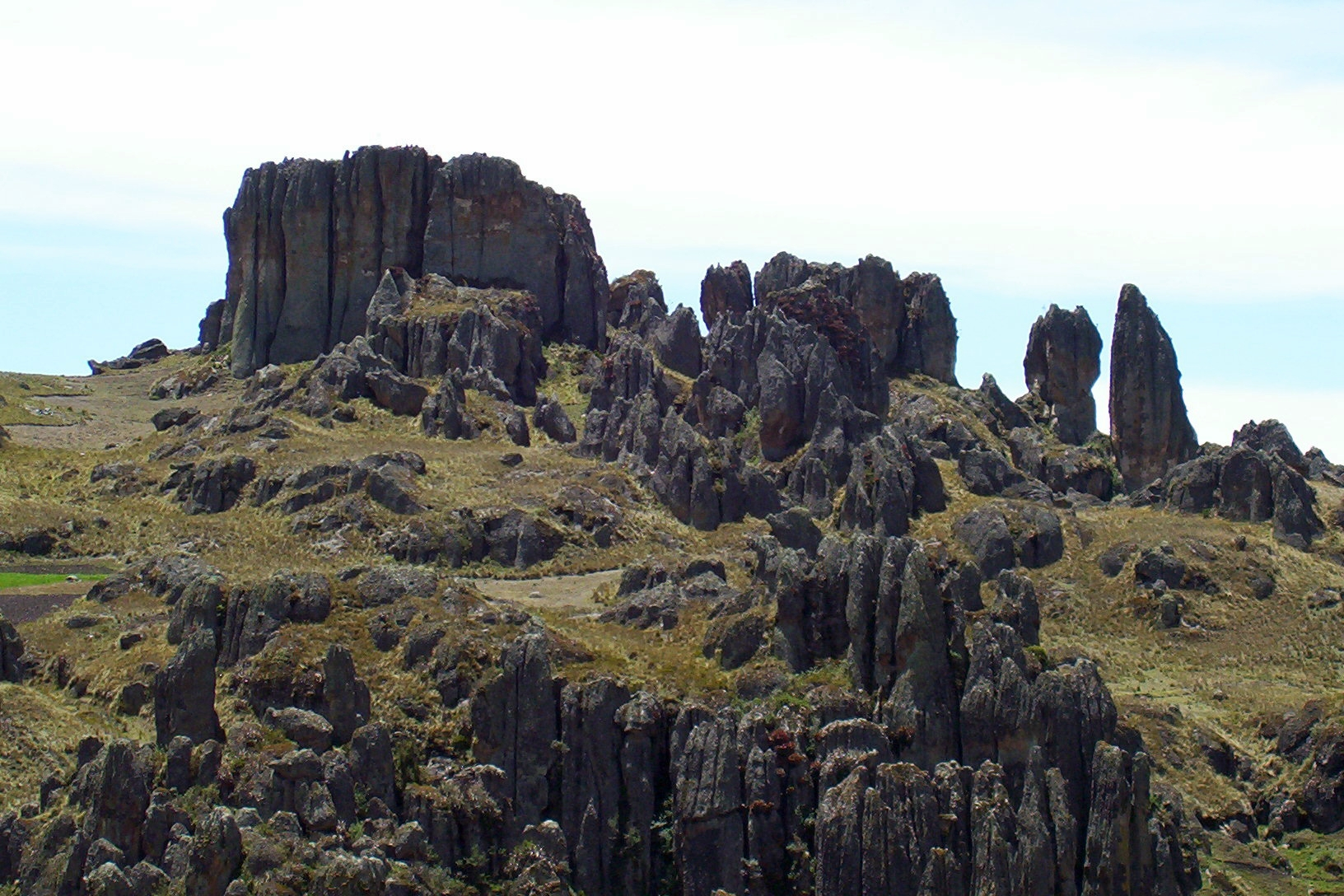
- Cordillera of Cajamarca

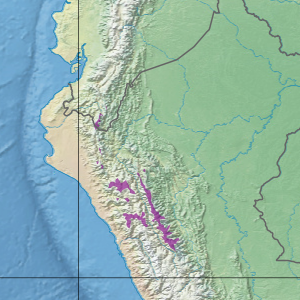
- Ecoregion territory (in purple)

Ecology
- Realm: Neotropical
- Biome: Montane grasslands and shrublands

Geography
- Area: 12,173 km^{2} (4,700 sq mi)
- Country: Peru, Ecuador
- Coordinates: 6.938°S 78.568°W
- Climate type: Cfb: warm temperate, fully humid, warm summer

The Cordillera Central páramo (NT1004) is an ecoregion containing páramo (high moorland) vegetation above the treeline in the Andes mountain range of northern Peru and southern Ecuador. Due to its isolation there are high levels of endemism. Despite many human settlements and some destruction of habitat by agriculture and mining, the ecoregion is relatively intact.

== Geography ==
=== Location ===
The Cordillera Central páramo is found in the upper regions of the Andes in northern Peru and southern Ecuador. The ecoregion has an area of 1,217,294 hectares (3,008,000 acres). (Note: Another source gives an area of 14,128 square kilometres (5,455 sq mi).) The páramo covers ridges and mountains in the high basins of the Piura and Cajamarca regions of Peru and in the south of Ecuador. The northern part of the ecoregion is surrounded by the Eastern Cordillera Real montane forests ecoregion. Further south it adjoins or is surrounded by Tumbes–Piura dry forests, Marañón dry forests, Peruvian Yungas, Ucayali moist forests, Sechura Desert and Central Andean wet puna.

=== Terrain ===
The Cordillera Central páramo begins at the treeline around 3,200 metres (10,500 ft) of elevation and extends upward to the permanent snowline at about 4,500 metres (14,800 ft). Some mountains are volcanic in origin from the Tertiary period, but there are also Paleozoic metamorphic and sedimentary rocks, Paleocene batholiths and areas of Precambrian rock. Terrain includes steep slopes on the high peaks, and flat or rolling tablelands cut by deep valleys in which the climate is milder. Soils are wet or marshy, with rocky regions and rock outcroppings. The páramo is the source of many streams that run down the east and west slopes of the Andes and provide an important source of water to the human populations lower down. In Peru it supplies the Quirós, Huancabamba and Chinchipe rivers.

=== Climate ===
The Köppen climate classification is "Cfb": warm temperate, fully humid, warm summer. The climate is cold, wet and very cloudy, with high rainfall. Temperatures generally fall below freezing at night.

== Ecology ==
The Cordillera Central páramo ecoregion is in the neotropical realm, in the montane grasslands and shrublands biome. The wet shrublands are the most southern group of páramos in the Neotropical realm. The great Huancabamba Depression lies to the south of the ecoregion, a barrier that prevents flora and fauna from migrating between the north and south Andes mountains.

The ecoregion is part of the Northern Andean Páramo global ecoregion, which includes the Cordillera Central páramo, Santa Marta páramo, Cordillera de Merida páramo and Northern Andean páramo terrestrial ecoregions. The plants and animals are adapted to the cold, dry conditions of the high peaks. There is a high level of local endemism, particularly on the more isolated peaks. Part of the Cordillera Central páramo has been identified as a hotspot, a threatened area with a high level of endemism. Other hotspots in Peru include the Marañón dry forests, central Peruvian Yungas and central Andean puna.

=== Flora ===
Vegetation includes tussock grasses and cushion plants, shrubs and sedges, often with an under-layer of lichens and moss. The lower levels of páramo merge into dwarf transitional forest and montane cloud forest. The characteristic vegetation consists of plants of the genera Calamagrostis, Agrostis and Hypericum, There are also shrubs of genera such as Polylepis and Escallonia. The isolated position of the páramos has resulted in high levels of endemism among the diverse plant species. There are 300 genera of spermatophytes with 1,000–1,500 species, of which about 60% are endemic. Notable species of flora include Cinchona officinalis and Schmardaea microphylla.

=== Fauna ===
The fauna of the plateau include species that originated from the Amazon basin, from the tropical Andes and from the northern desert areas. Mammals include mountain tapir (Tapirus pinchaque), little red brocket (Mazama rufina), spectacled bear (Tremarctos ornatus), northern pudú (Pudu mephistophiles) and small-eared shrews (genus Cryptotis). The mountain tapir (Tapirus pinchaque) is endangered. The ecoregion has three endemic bird species. Endangered birds include the bearded guan (Penelope barbata) and red-faced parrot (Hapalopsittaca pyrrhops). The rufous-breasted warbling finch (Poospiza rubecula) is also endangered.

Other fauna include the Huancabamba whorltail lizard (Stenocercus huancabambae), the frogs Astrotheca galeata, Gastrotheca lateonata, Lynchius parkeri, Gastrotheca nebulanastes and genus Eleutherodactylus and butterflies of the genera Dismorphia, Pagyris and Veladyris. Endangered amphibians include Atelopus peruensis, Hyloxalus elachyhistus, Lynchius parkeri, Pristimantis simonsii, Telmatobius brevipes, Telmatobius degener and Telmatobius thompsoni.

== Status ==
The World Wildlife Fund gives the ecoregion the status "Relatively Stable/Intact". The ecoregion has been used by humans for many years, with many settlements and highways crossing the plateau, but is still fairly intact, A recent expansion of the human population and increase in agriculture is destroying the habitat around settlements. Overgrazing by livestock is causing erosion of the soil. Mining waste sometimes contaminates the rivers. Protected areas include the Podocarpus National Park.

== Sources ==
- "Cordillera Central páramo", Global Species, Myers Enterprises II
- Giugale, Marcelo; Cibils, Vicente Fretes (2007), An Opportunity for a Different Peru: Prosperous, Equitable, and Governable, World Bank Publications, ISBN 978-0-8213-6863-3
- Northern Andean Paramo, WWF Global
- Salcedo, Juan Carlos Riveros, Eastern South America: Southern Ecuador and northern Peru (NT1004), WWF: World Wildlife Fund
- WildFinder, WWF: World Wildlife Fund
