= Telmatobius sanborni =

Conservation status
- Critically Endangered (IUCN 3.1)

Scientific classification
- Kingdom: Animalia
- Phylum: Chordata
- Class: Amphibia
- Order: Anura
- Family: Telmatobiidae
- Genus: Telmatobius
- Species: T. sanborni

Binomial name
- Telmatobius sanborni Schmidt, 1954

Species of frog

Telmatobius sanborni, or Sanborn's water frog, is a species of frog in the family Telmatobiidae. It is endemic to Bolivia and Peru.

== Taxonomy ==
Scientists used to consider this a synonym of T. marmoratus.

== Habitat ==
This semi-aquatic frog has been found on the steep slopes of the Andes Mountains near rivers and streams in cloud forests. Scientists observed this frog between 3100 and 3800 meters above sea level.

Scientists have not this frog in any protected park in Peru, but they found it in one park in Bolivia, Area Natural de Manejo Integrado Apolobamba, and they suspect it in another, Madidi National Park.

== Reproduction ==
The tadpoles develop in streams with fast current. The use their sucker mouths to hold on to rocks.

== Threats ==
The IUCN and Peru's Categorization in Endangered Species of Wild Fauna classify this frog as critically endangered. Bolivia's Red Book of Threatened Vertebrates classifies it as endangered. Scientists detected the fungus Batrachochytrium dendrobatidis on these frogs, so they believe the fungal disease chytridiomycosis kills them.

== Description ==
- De la Riva I (2006). E. O. Lavilla; I. De la Riva (eds.). "Bolivian frogs of the genus Telmatobius (Anura: Leptodactylidae): synopsis, taxonomic comments, and description of a new species". Studies on the Andean Frogs of the Genera Telmatobius and Batrachophrynus. 7. Valencia: Asociacion Herpetologica Espanola, Monografias de Herpetologia: 65–101.
