= T. niger =

T. niger may refer to:

- Tachypodoiulus niger, the white-legged snake millipede or black millipede, a millipede species found in Europe
- Telmatobius niger, a frog species endemic to Ecuador
- Threnetes niger, the sooty barbthroat, a hummingbird species

== See also ==
- Niger (disambiguation)
