= Telmatobius rubigo =

Conservation status
- Vulnerable (IUCN 3.1)

Scientific classification
- Kingdom: Animalia
- Phylum: Chordata
- Class: Amphibia
- Order: Anura
- Family: Telmatobiidae
- Genus: Telmatobius
- Species: T. rubigo

Binomial name
- Telmatobius rubigo Barrionuevo and Baldo, 2009

Species of frog

Telmatobius rubigo, the Laguna de los Pozuelos' rusted frog, is a species of frog in the family Telmatobiidae. It is endemic to Argentina.

== Habitat ==
Scientists observed this fully aquatic frog in streams on puna steppe areas. They found it among aquatic plants and under rocks. They found it between 1800 and 4500 meters above sea level.

Scientists found almost all of these frogs in a single protected place, Laguna de Pozuelos Biosphere Reserve.

== Relationship to humans ==
People harvest other frogs in Telmatobius to eat and use in medicine, but scientists have not confirmed whether humans eat this frog.

== Taxonomy ==
Scientists used to consider these frogs among Telmatobius marmoratus, but they are two different species.

== Threats ==
The IUCN classifies this frog as vulnerable. Human beings grow corn, beans, and flower crops near the strem where scientists found the frog. Fish from other parts of the world, for example trout, can kill this species. Human beings abstract water from streams to use in agriculture and livestock cultivation. Mining operations may begin near the reserve. Scientists believe the fungal disease chytridiomycosis could kill this frog because it has infected other frogs in Telmatobius.
