= Telmatobius mantaro =

Scientific classification
- Kingdom: Animalia
- Phylum: Chordata
- Class: Amphibia
- Order: Anura
- Family: Telmatobiidae
- Genus: Telmatobius
- Species: T. mantaro

Binomial name
- Telmatobius mantaro Ttito, Landauro, Venegas, De la Riva, and Chaparro, 2016

Species of amphibian

Telmatobius mantaro is a species of frog in the family Telmatobiidae. It is endemic to the eastern Cordillera Central of the Peruvian Andes. The specific name mantaro refers to the Mantaro River running near the type locality.

== Description ==
Adult males in the type series measure 49–56 mm (1.9–2.2 in) in snout–vent length. The largest female in the type seriest, a subadult, measures 43 mm (1.7 in) SVL. The head is slightly wider than it is long. The snout is rounded in lateral view and subtriangular in dorsal view. The tympanum is distinct and the supratympanic fold is well-developed. The fingers have swollen tips and short dermal lateral fringes. The toes are moderately webbed and have spherical tips. The body is generally dark green to brown, with yellow to orange blotches or marbling on limbs. The venter is dull gray with pale brown pale spots and reticulations or purplish–brown. The iris is brown-bronze and the pupil has a yellow-orange ring.

A Gosner stage 35 tadpole measures 75 mm (3.0 in) in total length, of which body makes 30 mm (1.2 in). The body is slightly dorso-ventrally depressed and oval in dorsal view. The tail is muscular.

== Habitat ==
Telmatobius mantaro is known from small streams at elevations of 2,240–3,170 m (7,350–10,400 ft) above sea level. The surroundings represent a range of vegetation types, from humid to dry montane forests to dense montane shrub surrounded by croplands.

== Conservation ==
As of February 2022, this species has not been included in the IUCN Red List of Threatened Species. Ttito and colleagues suggest that it should be classified as "critically endangered" because of its likely small total population size and the threat posed by chytridiomycosis.
