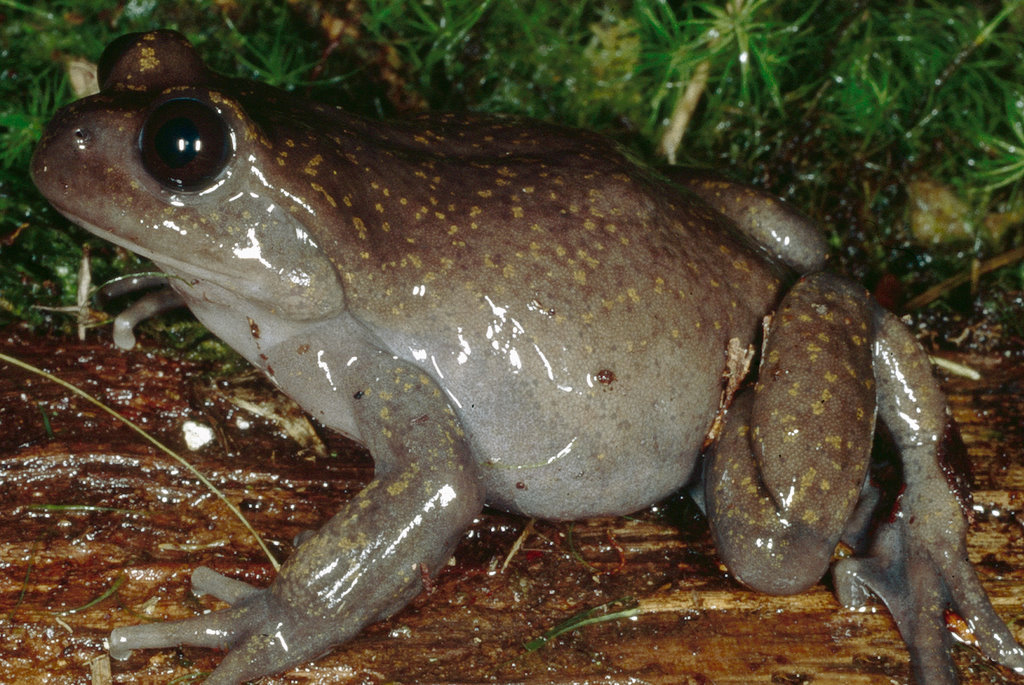

Conservation status
- Vulnerable (IUCN 3.1)

Scientific classification
- Kingdom: Animalia
- Phylum: Chordata
- Class: Amphibia
- Order: Anura
- Family: Telmatobiidae
- Genus: Telmatobius
- Species: T. atahualpai

Binomial name
- Telmatobius atahualpai Wiens, 1993

= Telmatobius atahualpai =

Species of amphibian

Telmatobius atahualpai (common name: Amazonas water frog) is a species of frog in the family Telmatobiidae. It is endemic to the Cordillera Central of northern Peru and found in the San Martín and Amazonas Regions at 2,600–4,000 m (8,500–13,100 ft) asl.

== Description ==
The skin of the dorsum is black with green flecks. The belly is gray. Some of its teeth resemble fangs.

== Habitat ==
This semi-riparian frog is found in streams in forest and páramo habitats. It has been found under rocks in the water and on the forest floor.

Scientists have found the frog in one protected area: Río Abiseo National Park.

== Relationship to humans ==
Human beings harvest other frogs in Telmatobius for food and medicine. Scientists think people may do the same with T. truebae.

== Young ==
This frog reproduces in streams. Scientists observed tadpoles in fast-moving water. These are the most highly specialized tadpoles in the genus reported as of 2017.

== Threats ==
The IUCN classifies this frog as vulnerable to extinction. Its threats include intensive livestock farming, associated pollution, and fires. Scientists believe the fungal disease chytridiomycosis may pose a threat to this frog because it has killed other frogs in the area, but they have not yet reported the Batrachochytrium dendrobatidis fungus on individuals of this species.

== Original publication ==
- Wiens, J.J. (1993). "Systematics of the leptodactylid frog genus Telmatobius in the Andes of northern Peru. Occ". Papers of the Museum of Natural History, University of Kansas. 162: 1–76.
