= Telmatobius hypselocephalus =

Conservation status
- Endangered (IUCN 3.1)

Scientific classification
- Kingdom: Animalia
- Phylum: Chordata
- Class: Amphibia
- Order: Anura
- Family: Telmatobiidae
- Genus: Telmatobius
- Species: T. hypselocephalus

Binomial name
- Telmatobius hypselocephalus Lavilla & Laurent, 1989 "1988"

Species of frog

Telmatobius hypselocephalus is a species of frog in the family Telmatobiidae. It is endemic to Argentina.

== Habit ==
This fully aquatic frog lives in stream habitats in scrubby areas. Scientists observed this frog between 3500 and 3600 meters above sea level.

== Threats ==
Scientists from the IUCN classify this frog as endangered the Argentinean National Red List classifies it as vulnerable. Water pollution from mining and livestock grazing can contaminate its habitat. Human beings also harvest vegetation for firewood. Introduced fish, for example trout, can kill this species. Scientists believe the fungal disease chytridiomycosis might kill this frog too because it has killed other frogs in Telmatobius.
