= Telmatobius necopinus =

Conservation status
- Data Deficient (IUCN 3.1)

Scientific classification
- Kingdom: Animalia
- Phylum: Chordata
- Class: Amphibia
- Order: Anura
- Family: Telmatobiidae
- Genus: Telmatobius
- Species: T. necopinus

Binomial name
- Telmatobius necopinus Wiens, 1993

Species of frog

Telmatobius necopinus is a species of frog in the family Telmatobiidae. It is endemic to Peru.

== Habitat ==
This semi-aquatic frog lives in riparian habitats. Scientists know it from the type locality in the Cordillera Central mountains. Scientists found them under rocks in streams in cloud forests and in roadside ditches. They found it 2050 meters above sea level.

The frog lives in one protected area: Alto Mayo Protection Forest.

== Relationship to humans ==
People catch other frogs in Telmatobius to eat, sell, and make into medicine.

== Threats ==
The IUCN classifies this frog as data deficient with few confirmed threats. Scientists believe the fungal disease chytridiomycosis may be a threat because of the effect it has had on other frogs in the area.

== Original description ==
- Wiens, J. J. (1993). "Systematics of the leptodactylid frog genus Telmatobius in the Andes of northern Peru". Occ. Papers of the Museum of Natural History, University of Kansas. 162: 1–76.
