= Telmatobius hintoni =

Conservation status
- Vulnerable (IUCN 3.1)

Scientific classification
- Kingdom: Animalia
- Phylum: Chordata
- Class: Amphibia
- Order: Anura
- Family: Telmatobiidae
- Genus: Telmatobius
- Species: T. hintoni

Binomial name
- Telmatobius hintoni Parker, 1940

Synonyms
- Telmatobius marmoratus hintoni Parker, 1940

Species of frog

Telmatobius hintoni is a species of frog in the family Telmatobiidae. It is endemic to Bolivia.

== Habitat ==
This frog is heavily aquatic. It lives in permanent streams high in the Andes Mountains. Scientists saw this frog between 2700 and 4400 meters above sea level.

Scientists have seen this frog in one protected park: Parque Nacional Tunari.

== Reproduction ==
The male frogs call to the female frogs from underwater or from rocks.

Scientists beieve the male frogs engage in parental care of the eggs but this has yet to be confirmed. Scientists have seen T. hontoni frogs engaging in territorial aggressive behavior, but they believe that what they saw was in excess of what would be necessary to guard a clutch.

== Threats ==
The IUCN classifies this frog as vulnerable to extinction. Threats include habitat loss in favor of agriculture, human habitation, and other purposes, much of which also adds water pollution to the water. Humans also abstract water from the frogs' habitat to use. Scientists have detected the fungus Batrachochytrium dendrobatidis on this frog, so they suspect chytridiomycosis as a threat as well.

== Original description ==
- De la Riva I (2006). E. O. Lavilla; I. De la Riva (eds.). "Bolivian frogs of the genus Telmatobius (Anura: Leptodactylidae): synopsis, taxonomic comments, and description of a new species". Studies on the Andean Frogs of the Genera Telmatobius and Batrachophrynus. 7. Asociacion Herpetologica Espanola, Monografias de Herpetologia: 65–101.
