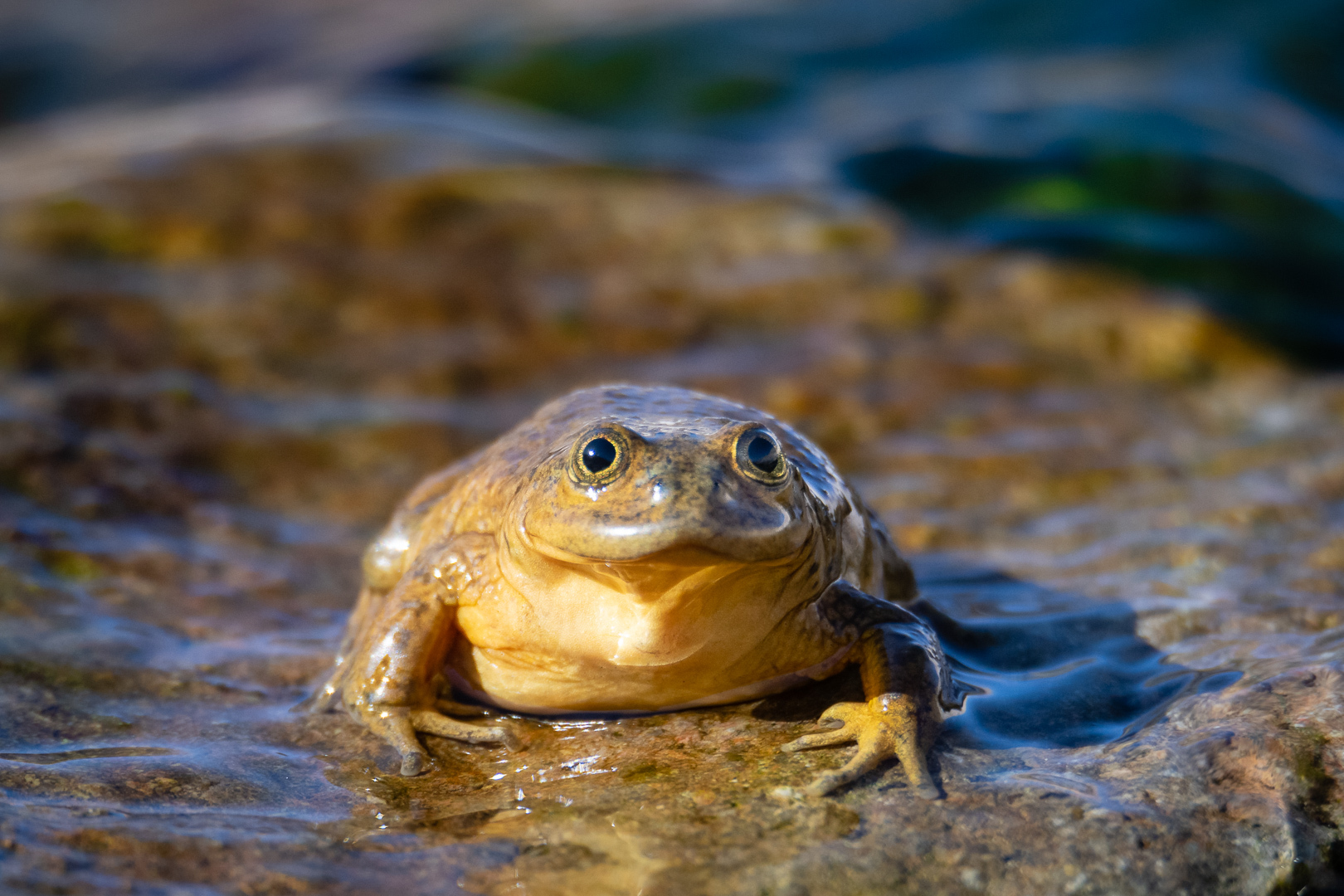

Conservation status
- Endangered (IUCN 3.1)

Scientific classification
- Kingdom: Animalia
- Phylum: Chordata
- Class: Amphibia
- Order: Anura
- Family: Telmatobiidae
- Genus: Telmatobius
- Species: T. chusmisensis

Binomial name
- Telmatobius chusmisensis Formas, Cuevas, and Nuñez, 2006
- Telmatobius chusmisensis is known from the region of its type locality in northern Chile

= Telmatobius chusmisensis =

Species of amphibian

Telmatobius chusmisensis is a species of frogs in the family Telmatobiidae. It is endemic to northern Chile and is only known from a number of localities in the Tarapacá Region. The specific name chusmisensis refers to its type locality, Chusmisa.

== Description ==
Males measure 50–53 mm (2.0–2.1 in) and females 57–63 mm (2.2–2.5 in) in snout–vent length. Head is slightly narrower than body. Forelimbs are moderaterely robust; hind limbs are long and have webbed toes. Ground colour of dorsum is light brown or greenish brown, profusely spotted with minute, black spots. Belly is white or light yellow. Ventral surfaces of thighs are light brown. There are irregular apricot-coloured spots on dorsum and ventral surfaces of thighs. Dorsal surface, flanks, and limbs are covered with small, spiculate granules.

Tadpoles of Gosner stages 28–39 are large, from 38 to 99 mm (1.5 to 3.9 in) in total length and from 15 to 37 mm (0.59 to 1.46 in) in body length. One tadpole was near metamorphosis (Gosner stage 42) and measured 33 mm (1.3 in) in snout–vent length.

== Habitat ==
Telmatobius chusmisensis is known from discrete populations at elevations of 1,800–4,500 m (5,900–14,800 ft) above sea level. At the type locality, T. chusmisensis were collected from a small, slow-moving stream in a semi-desert area. Adults were encountered below stones and tadpoles below aquatic plants along the banks of the stream. As a species found in a generally arid area and confined to aquatic habitats, its distribution is naturally fragmented. Extraction of surface water is a threat to this species. It is not known from any protected areas.
