= Telmatobius achachila =

Telmatobius achachila Temporal range: Miocene

Scientific classification
- Kingdom: Animalia
- Phylum: Chordata
- Class: Amphibia
- Order: Anura
- Family: Telmatobiidae
- Genus: Telmatobius
- Species: †T. achachila

Binomial name
- †Telmatobius achachila Gómez, Ventura, Turazzini, Marivaux, Flores, Boscaini, Fernández-Monescillo, Quispe, Prámparo, Fauquette, Martin, Münch, Pujos and Antoine, 2024

Species of frog

Telmatobius achachila is a species of frog in the family Telmatobiidae. Its fossilized remains were found in what is now Bolivia. Scientists dated the fossil to Miocene epoch. The fossil was found on the altiplano, 3690 meters above sea level. Scientists examined the frog's genes and anatompy bones to explore how Telmatobius frogs evolved and underwent adaptive radiation as their habitat was driven upward, eventually taking on their current niche as high-altitude frogs.
