= Telmatobius huayra =

Conservation status
- Vulnerable (IUCN 3.1)

Scientific classification
- Kingdom: Animalia
- Phylum: Chordata
- Class: Amphibia
- Order: Anura
- Family: Telmatobiidae
- Genus: Telmatobius
- Species: T. huayra

Binomial name
- Telmatobius huayra Lavilla & Ergueta, 1995

Species of frog

Telmatobius huayra is a species of frog in the family Telmatobiidae. It is endemic to Bolivia and nearby parts of Argentina.

== Habitat ==
Scientists observed this aquatic frog in streams, rivers, and peat bogs in cold desert habitats high in the Cordillera Oriental mountains. Some of the frogs were in a hot spring. The scientists observed the frog 4200 meters above sea level.

Scientists reported the frog in one protected place: Reserva Nacional de Fauna Andina Eduardo Avaroa.

== Threats ==
The IUCN classifies this frog as vulnerable to extinction. Climate change can harm this frog by exacerbating droughts. Excess tourism and livestock grazing can alter the frog's habitat. Scientists detected the fungus Batrachochytrium dendrobatidis on some frogs in this species in 1982, and they believe the fungal disease chytridiomycosis might kill this frog.
