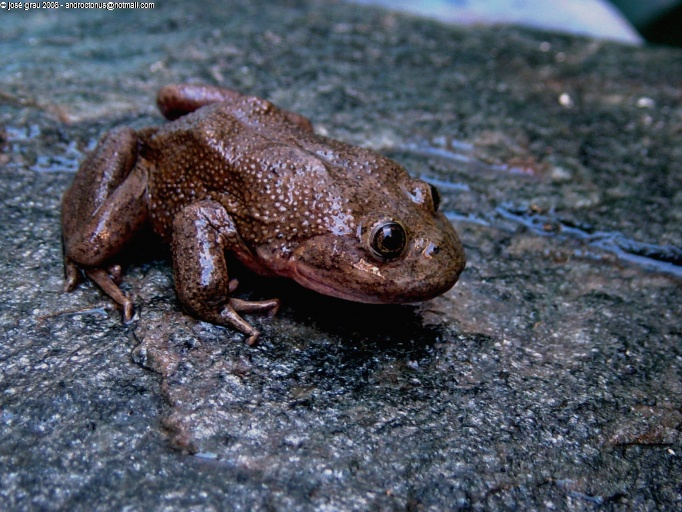
- Telmatobius species from altiplano lakes in northern Chile.

Scientific classification
- Kingdom: Animalia
- Phylum: Chordata
- Class: Amphibia
- Order: Anura
- Suborder: Neobatrachia
- Superfamily: Hyloidea
- Family: Telmatobiidae; Fitzinger, 1843
- Genus: Telmatobius; Wiegmann, 1834

Diversity
- 63 species (see text)

Synonyms
- Batrachophrynus Peters, 1873

= Telmatobius =

Genus of amphibians

Telmatobius is a genus of frogs native to the Andean highlands in South America, where they are found in Ecuador, Peru, Bolivia, northwestern Argentina and northern Chile. It is the only genus in the family Telmatobiidae. Some sources recognize Batrachophrynus as a valid genus distinct from Telmatobius.

== Etymology ==
The word Telmatobius is derived from the Greek: τέλμα (télma, "swamp") and βίος (bios, "life").

== Ecology and conservation ==
All Telmatobius species are closely associated with water and most species are semi-aquatic, while a few are entirely aquatic. They are found in and near lakes, rivers and wetlands in the Andean highlands at altitudes between 1,000 and 5,200 m (3,300–17,100 ft). The genus includes two of the world's largest fully aquatic frogs, the Lake Junin frog (T. macrostomus) and Titicaca water frog (T. culeus), but the remaining are considerably smaller. In terms of tadpoles, the species with the largest tadpoles tend to be in higher elevated streams and lakes. This includes the species T. culeus, T. macrostomus, T. mayoloi, and T. gigas. Telmatobius contains more than 60 species; the vast majority seriously threatened, especially from habitat loss, pollution, diseases (chytridiomycosis and nematode infections), introduced trout, and capture for human consumption.

The three Ecuadorian species have not been seen for years and may already be extinct: T. cirrhacelis last seen in 1981, T. niger in 1994 and T. vellardi in 1987. Similarly, seven of the fifteen species in Bolivia have not been seen for years. However, some might still be rediscovered: the Bolivian T. yuracare had not been seen in the wild in a decade and there was only a single captive male. A few wild individuals were located in 2019, thus ending the captive male's informal status as an endling (last survivor of the species).

== Species ==
There are currently 63 species recognized in the genus Telmatobius, but the validity of some species is questionable and it is likely that undescribed species remain.

- Telmatobius achachila Gómez et al., 2024
- Telmatobius arequipensis Vellard, 1955
- Telmatobius atacamensis Gallardo, 1962
- Telmatobius atahualpai Wiens, 1993
- Telmatobius bolivianus Parker, 1940
- Telmatobius brachydactylus (Peters, 1873)
- Telmatobius brevipes Vellard, 1951
- Telmatobius brevirostris Vellard, 1955
- Telmatobius carrillae Morales, 1988
- Telmatobius ceiorum Laurent, 1970
- Telmatobius chusmisensis Formas, Cuevas, and Nuñez, 2006
- Telmatobius cirrhacelis Trueb, 1979
- Telmatobius colanensis Wiens, 1993
- Telmatobius contrerasi Cei, 1977
- Telmatobius culeus (Garman, 1876)
- Telmatobius dankoi Formas et al., 1999
- Telmatobius degener Wiens, 1993
- Telmatobius edaphonastes De la Riva, 1995
- Telmatobius espadai De la Riva, 2005
- Telmatobius fronteriensis Benavides, Ortiz, and Formas, 2002
- Telmatobius gigas Vellard, 1969
- Telmatobius halli Noble, 1938
- Telmatobius hauthali Koslowsky, 1895
- Telmatobius hintoni Parker, 1940
- Telmatobius hockingi Salas and Sinsch, 1996
- Telmatobius huayra Lavilla and Ergueta-Sandoval, 1995
- Telmatobius hypselocephalus Lavilla and Laurent, 1989
- Telmatobius ignavus Barbour and Noble, 1920
- Telmatobius intermedius Vellard, 1951
- Telmatobius jelskii (Peters, 1873)
- Telmatobius laevis Philippi, 1902
- Telmatobius laticeps Laurent, 1977
- Telmatobius latirostris Vellard, 1951
- Telmatobius macrostomus (Peters, 1873)
- Telmatobius mantaro Ttito et al., 2016
- Telmatobius marmoratus (Duméril and Bibron, 1841)
- Telmatobius mayoloi Salas and Sinsch, 1996
- Telmatobius mendelsoni De la Riva, Trueb, and Duellman, 2012
- Telmatobius necopinus Wiens, 1993
- Telmatobius niger Barbour and Noble, 1920
- Telmatobius oxycephalus Vellard, 1946
- Telmatobius pefauri Veloso and Trueb, 1976
- Telmatobius peruvianus Wiegmann, 1834
- Telmatobius philippii Cuevas and Formas, 2002
- Telmatobius pinguiculus Lavilla and Laurent, 1989
- Telmatobius pisanoi Laurent, 1977
- Telmatobius platycephalus Lavilla and Laurent, 1989
- Telmatobius punctatus Vellard, 1955
- Telmatobius rimac Schmidt, 1954
- Telmatobius rubigo Barrionuevo and Baldo, 2009
- Telmatobius sanborni Schmidt, 1954
- Telmatobius schreiteri Vellard, 1946
- Telmatobius scrocchii Laurent and Lavilla, 1986
- Telmatobius sibiricus De la Riva and Harvey, 2003
- Telmatobius simonsi Parker, 1940
- Telmatobius stephani Laurent, 1973
- Telmatobius thompsoni Wiens, 1993
- Telmatobius timens De la Riva, Aparicio, and Ríos, 2005
- Telmatobius truebae Wiens, 1993
- Telmatobius vellardi Munsterman and Leviton, 1959
- Telmatobius ventriflavum Catenazzi, Vargas García, and Lehr, 2015
- Telmatobius verrucosus Werner, 1899
- Telmatobius vilamensis Formas, Benavides, and Cuevas, 2003
- Telmatobius yuracare De la Riva, 1994
