= Telmatobius mayoloi =

Conservation status
- Endangered (IUCN 3.1)

Scientific classification
- Kingdom: Animalia
- Phylum: Chordata
- Class: Amphibia
- Order: Anura
- Family: Telmatobiidae
- Genus: Telmatobius
- Species: T. mayoloi

Binomial name
- Telmatobius mayoloi Salas & Sinsch, 1996

Species of frog

Telmatobius mayoloi is a species of frog in the family Telmatobiidae. It is endemic to Peru.

== Habitat ==
This fully aquatic frog lives in riparian and river habitats in puna areas. People see the frog under rocks or in clumps of underwater plants. Scientists observed the frog between 3,515 and 4,150 metres (11,532 and 13,615 ft) above sea level.

== Relationship to humans ==
Telmatobius mayoloi is used in food and medicine. Scientists observed T. mayoloi soups.

== Reproduction ==
Scientists believe this frog reproduces year-round because they observed tadpoles of different ages in the same spaces.

== Threats ==
The IUCN classifies this frog as endangered and Peru's own systems classify it as critically endangered. Water pollution from livestock and agriculture can get into the water. Overharvesting for food may be an issue. Scientists believe the fungal disease chytridiomycosis may be a threat as well. They observed the causitive fungus Batrachochytrium dendrobatidis on preserved museum specimens.
