= Telmatobius verrucosus =

Conservation status
- Critically Endangered (IUCN 3.1)

Scientific classification
- Kingdom: Animalia
- Phylum: Chordata
- Class: Amphibia
- Order: Anura
- Family: Telmatobiidae
- Genus: Telmatobius
- Species: T. verrucosus

Binomial name
- Telmatobius verrucosus Werner, 1899

Synonyms
- Telmatobius jahuira Lavilla & Ergueta, 1995

Species of frog

Telmatobius verrucosus is a species of frog in the family Telmatobiidae. It is endemic to Bolivia.

== Habitat ==
This aquatic frog lives in streams in cloud forests, elfin forests, ceja de montaña, and sub-páramo habitats. This frog has been found under stones in these streams. Scientists observed it between 2600 and 3800 meters above sea level.

Scientists believe this frog may live in two protected places: Parque Nacional Cotapata and in the Cordillera Apolobamba.

== Young ==
One study reported that T. verrucosus tadpoles have adaptations for fast-moving currents.

== Threats ==
The IUCN classifies this frog as critically endangered because it has experienced an 80 percent population drop in recent years, even within undisturbed habitat. Scientists believe the culprit may be the fungal disease chytridiomycosis, which has killed many other stream-dwelling amphibians in South America. Scientists detected the fungus Batrachochytrium dendrobatidis, which causes chytridiomycosis, on T. verrucosus specimens in 1996 and again in 2004. The frog is also threatened by habitat loss and water pollution.

== Original description ==
- de la Riva I (2005). "Bolivian frogs of the genus Telmatobius: synopsis, taxonomic comments and description of a new species". Rev Herp Espan Monogr Herpetol. 7: 65–101.
