= Telmatobius cirrhacelis =

Conservation status
- Critically Endangered (IUCN 3.1)

Scientific classification
- Kingdom: Animalia
- Phylum: Chordata
- Class: Amphibia
- Order: Anura
- Family: Telmatobiidae
- Genus: Telmatobius
- Species: T. cirrhacelis

Binomial name
- Telmatobius cirrhacelis Trueb, 1979

Species of frog

Telmatobius cirrhacelis is a species of frog in the family Telmatobiidae. It is endemic to Ecuador.

== Description ==
The adult male frog is about 56.6 mm long in snout-vent length and the adult female frog is about 49.6 to 68.7 mm long. The skin of the dorsum brown in color with the distinct orange spots for which the species has its English name. There are also orange spots on the dorsal surfaces of the four limbs. The flanks and limbs are olive-brown in color. The frog's belly is gray and light orange in color. The front and back feet are grayer in color with some less obvious blotching.

== Etymology ==
Scientists named the frog using the Greek words kirrhos for "orange" and kelis for "spot."

== Habitat ==
This frog lives in cold forests with moss, lichen, bromeliads, and other plants. It lives near streams. Scientists observed this frog between 2700 and 3200 meters above sea level.

Most of these frogs live in one protected park: Parque Nacional Podocarpus.

== Threats ==
The IUCN classifies this frog as critically endangered, with no more than 49 mature individuals alive at any one time.. Scientists believe that diseases, including but not limited to chytridiomycosis, may have affected the population and caused deformities. Climatic changes may also have affected the population. Habitat loss in favor of agriculture, logging, and make ranching. People have also harvested this frog as food.

== Original description ==
- Trueb, L. (1979). "Leptodactylid Frogs of the Genus Telmatobius in Ecuador with the Description of a New Species.". Copeia (4): 714–733.
