= Telmatobius punctatus =

Conservation status
- Endangered (IUCN 3.1)

Scientific classification
- Kingdom: Animalia
- Phylum: Chordata
- Class: Amphibia
- Order: Anura
- Family: Telmatobiidae
- Genus: Telmatobius
- Species: T. punctatus

Binomial name
- Telmatobius punctatus Vellard, 1955

Synonyms
- Telmatobius brevirostris punctatus Vellard, 1955

Species of frog

Telmatobius punctatus, the Huánaco water frog, is a species of frog in the family Telmatobiidae. It is endemic to Peru.

== Habitat ==
This frog lives in streams in cloud forests and puna habitats. Scientists observed this frog between 2300 and 3000 meters above sea level in valleys between the Andes Mountains.

Scientists have seen this frog one protected park: Nor Yauyos-Cochas Landscape Reserve.

== Reproduction ==
The tadpoles have been observed in streams with underwater vegetation.

== Threats ==
The IUCN classifies this frog as endangered and Peru's Categorization in Endangered Species of Wild Fauna classifies it as critically endangered. Potato farms, mines, and houses produce water pollution that affects this frog. Deforestation is also an issue. Human beings use this frog in food and medicine. Scientists believe the fungal disease chytridiomycosis could kill this frog, but they have not reported the fungus Batrachochytrium dendrobatidis on any specimens in this species as of 2017.

== Scientific descriptions ==
- Vellard, J. (1955). "Estudios sobre batracios andinos. III. Los Telmatobius del grupo jelskii". Memorias del Museo de Historia Natural "Javier Prado". 4. Lima: 1–28.
- Lehr, E. (2005). Lavilla, E. O.; I. De la Riva (eds.). "The Telmatobius and Batrachophrynus species of Peru". Monografías de Herpetología. Estudio sobre las rana andinas de los géneros Telmatobius y Batrachophrynus (Anura: Leptodactylidae). 7. Valencia: Asociación Herpetológica Española: 39–64.
