= Telmatobius mendelsoni =

Conservation status
- Critically endangered, possibly extinct (IUCN 3.1)

Scientific classification
- Kingdom: Animalia
- Phylum: Chordata
- Class: Amphibia
- Order: Anura
- Family: Telmatobiidae
- Genus: Telmatobius
- Species: T. mendelsoni

Binomial name
- Telmatobius mendelsoni De la Riva, Trueb, and Duellman, 2012

Species of frog

Telmatobius mendelsoni is a species of frog in the family Telmatobiidae. It was endemic to Peru.

== Description ==
This frog had unusual ossification. It had a longer jaw than other frogs in Telmatobius and more ossification inside its skill, giving it fewer fontanelle than is typical for frogs.

== Home ==
Scientists found this frog next to roads and in streams in forests high in the mountains. Scientists found the frog in the water plants and under rocks. The scientists saw the frog 2400 meters above sea level.

The frog lives in at least one protected place, Manu National Park.

== Threats ==
The IUCN classifies this frog as critically endangered and possibly extinct. It was last seen in 1984. Because of the precipitous decline in this population, scientists believe the frogs may have been killed by the fungal disease chytridiomycosis.
