= Telmatobius pinguiculus =

Conservation status
- Endangered (IUCN 3.1)

Scientific classification
- Kingdom: Animalia
- Phylum: Chordata
- Class: Amphibia
- Order: Anura
- Family: Telmatobiidae
- Genus: Telmatobius
- Species: T. pinguiculus

Binomial name
- Telmatobius pinguiculus Lavilla & Laurent, 1989 "1988"

Species of frog

Telmatobius pinguiculus is a species of frog in the family Telmatobiidae. It is endemic to the Catamarca Province of Argentina.

== Habitat ==
Its natural habitats are permanent streams that flow through grasslands. Scientists observed this animal between 3100 and 4300 meters above sea level.

== Threats ==
The IUCN classifies this species as endangered and the Argentinean National Red List classifies it as vulnerable. Principal threats include water pollution from mines and livestock, invasive fish such as trout, and diversion of waterways. Scientists consider the lethal fungal disease chytridiomycosis a possible future threat.
