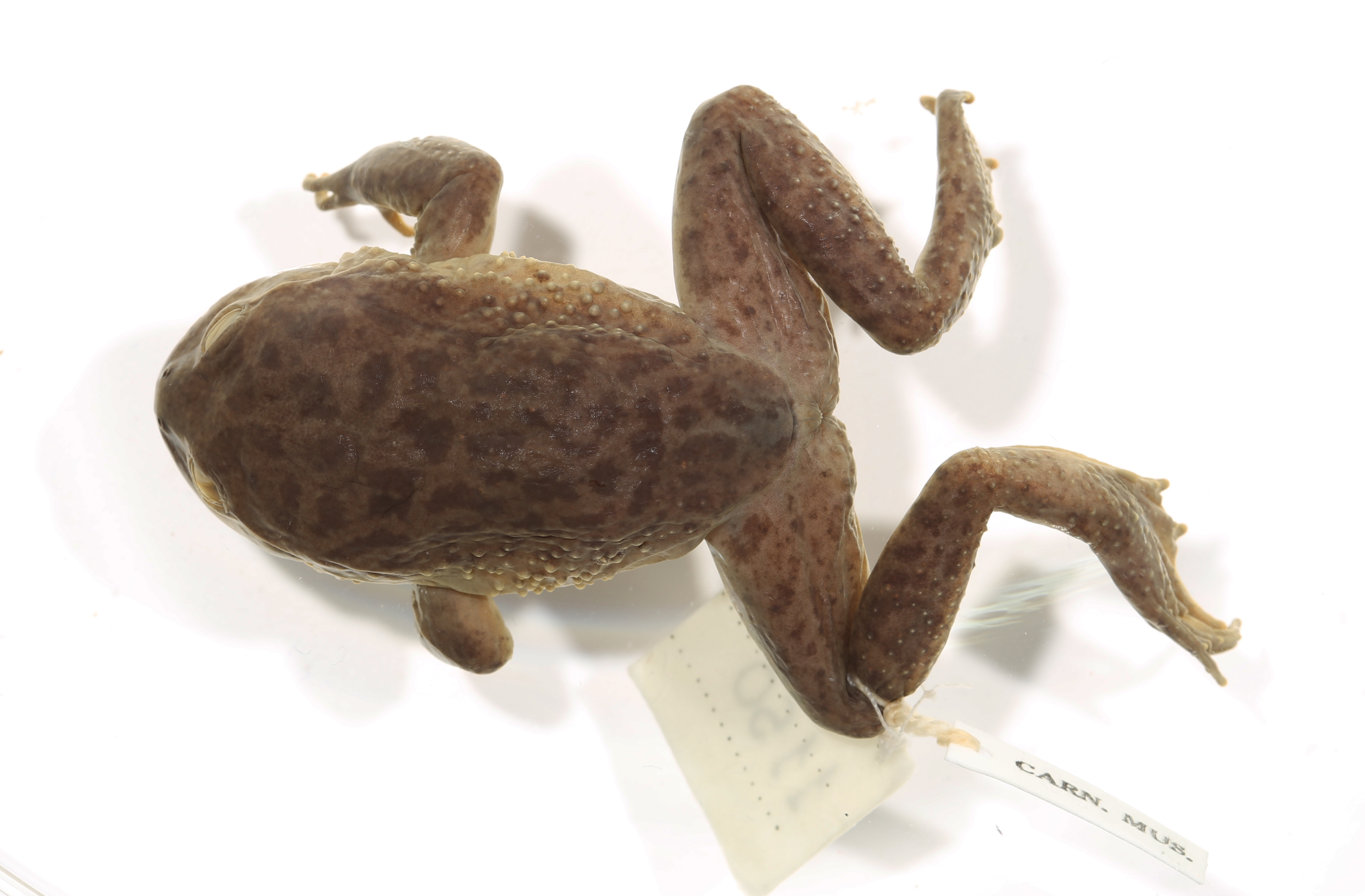

Conservation status
- Endangered (IUCN 3.1)

Scientific classification
- Kingdom: Animalia
- Phylum: Chordata
- Class: Amphibia
- Order: Anura
- Family: Telmatobiidae
- Genus: Telmatobius
- Species: T. atacamensis

Binomial name
- Telmatobius atacamensis Gallardo, 1962

= Telmatobius atacamensis =

Species of frog

Telmatobius atacamensis, commonly known as the Atacama water frog, is an aquatic frog species of the family Telmatobiidae. It is endemic to the Puna region of Salta, Argentina, where it inhabits high-altitude streams and wetlands. Due to its restricted range and specialized habitat, T. atacamensis faces significant conservation threats, including habitat degradation, chytridiomycosis, and invasive species.

== Habitat and Distribution ==
Telmatobius atacamensis is a strictly aquatic species, inhabiting mountain rivers, streams, and wetlands in the high-altitude environments of northwestern Argentina. Although the Telmatobius genus is widely distributed from Ecuador to Chile and Argentina, T. atacamensis is one of only three out of fourteen Telmatobius species in Argentina that are microendemic to the Puna region of Salta. Its known range is less than 20,000 km^{2}, primarily within the San Antonio de los Cobres area and Los Patos River.

The Puna region is characterized by an arid climate, with low annual precipitation, wide range of daily temperatures, and poorly connected wetlands. Due to these harsh conditions, anuran populations in this area are highly fragmented, with frogs confined to isolated bodies of water.

In addition to natural geographical constraints, anthropogenic activities further restrict the species' distribution. Urbanization, mining, pollution, and infrastructure projects create barriers that limit the connectivity of aquatic habitats. The combination of harsh environmental conditions and human impact makes T. atacamensis highly vulnerable to ecosystem changes, threatening its already restricted population.

== Diet ==
Telmatobius atacamensis primarily feeds on benthic invertebrates, with its diet consisting mainly of Diptera larvae, Coleoptera, and Hemiptera. Studies have shown no significant variation in diet composition between males, females, and juveniles, suggesting diet remains consistent across different life stages.

== Reproduction ==
The reproductive potential of Telmatobius atacamensis remains poorly documented, but based on data from related Telmatobius species, it is estimated that females lay up to 500 eggs per clutch. Tadpoles exhibit slow development, taking several months to reach metamorphosis in the cold, high-altitude waters of the Puna region.

== Morphology ==
As an exclusively aquatic species, T. atacamensis has evolved several morphological adaptations suited for life in high-altitude aquatic environments. Tadpoles possess a bicuspidate buccal spur and a distinctive arrangement of buccal papillae, traits commonly found among Telmatobius species. The oral disc, which accounts for 23–25% of total body length, features a keratinized jaw sheath and a row of marginal papillae, adaptations that facilitate foraging for benthic invertebrates in fast-flowing mountain streams.

== Threats and Conservation Status ==
Telmatobius atacamensis is classified as Endangered by the IUCN Red List and is also recognized as endangered at the national level in Argentina. Its primary threats stem from habitat degradation, mining, pollution, disease, invasive species, and climate change, all of which contribute to its declining population.

=== Habitat Degradation ===
Urbanization and large-scale infrastructure projects, such as the construction of the Santa Rosa aqueduct, pose significant risks to T. atacamensis. This aqueduct passes through Los Patos River, permanently altering water flow and degrading critical aquatic habitats.

=== Mining ===
Although La Concordia Mine near the San Antonio wetlands ceased operations decades ago, its legacy continues to affect local ecosystems. Abandoned machinery and contaminated rubble remain unremediated, with studies documenting mineral residues inside the stomachs of T. atacamensis specimens. Additionally, a 1989 study found individuals with digit malformations, possibly linked to toxic metal exposure from mining runoff.

=== Chytridiomycosis (Fungal Disease) ===
A major threat to T. atacamensis is chytridiomycosis, an infectious disease caused by the fungus Batrachochytrium dendrobatidis. The disease has been directly observed in wild populations of T. atacamensis in Argentina, contributing to severe declines. Furthermore, climate change is exacerbating this issue, as rising temperatures in high-altitude wetlands create ideal conditions for fungal reproduction, increasing the frequency of disease outbreaks.

=== Invasive Species ===
The introduction of invasive species, particularly the rainbow trout (Oncorhynchus mykiss), poses a significant threat. These fish compete with T. atacamensis for food and prey on tadpoles and juvenile frogs, further endangering the species.

=== Climate Change ===
Shifts in precipitation patterns and rising temperatures are further destabilizing T. atacamensis' fragile habitat. Increased rainfall variability in the Puna region may cause sudden floods, while longer dry and warm periods reduce the availability of stable aquatic environments, essential for reproduction, development, and survival. As an exclusively aquatic species, T. atacamensis is particularly sensitive to these environmental shifts, heightening its risk of extinction.
