= Telmatobius fronteriensis =

Conservation status
- Critically Endangered (IUCN 3.1)

Scientific classification
- Kingdom: Animalia
- Phylum: Chordata
- Class: Amphibia
- Order: Anura
- Family: Telmatobiidae
- Genus: Telmatobius
- Species: T. fronteriensis

Binomial name
- Telmatobius fronteriensis Benavides, Ortíz & Formas, 2002

Species of frog

Telmatobius fronteriensis is a species of frog in the family Telmatobiidae. It is found in Chile and possibly Bolivia.

== Habitat ==
Scientists found this frog in a pool of water in a stream 4150 meters above sea level. The stream flowed through the border of Chile and Bolivia, which is why scientists think it may live in Bolivia as well. The area is very arid, home to grasses and shrubs.

== Threat ==
The IUCN classifies this frog as critically endangered, with no more than 249 adult frogs alive at any one time. The area has undergone intense habitat loss as humans abstracted water from the stream. There was once a sulfur mine nearby, and there is still a copper mine about 20 km away.
