= Telmatobius scrocchii =

Conservation status
- Critically Endangered (IUCN 3.1)

Scientific classification
- Kingdom: Animalia
- Phylum: Chordata
- Class: Amphibia
- Order: Anura
- Family: Telmatobiidae
- Genus: Telmatobius
- Species: T. scrocchii

Binomial name
- Telmatobius scrocchii Laurent & Lavilla, 1986

Species of frog

Telmatobius scrocchii is a species of frog in the family Telmatobiidae. It is endemic to Argentina.

== Habitat ==
This aquatic frog has been found in streams in shrubland. Scientists observed this frog between 2200 and 2300 meters above sea level.

== Threats ==
The IUCN classifies this frog as critically endangered, with no more than 49 adults alive at any time. The Argentinean National Red List classifies it as vulnerable. Threats include pollution from mines, introduced fish such as trout, and habitat loss from avalanches and conversion by humans. Scientists believe the disease chytridiomycosis could kill the frogs.
