= Telmatobius schreiteri =

Conservation status
- Endangered (IUCN 3.1)

Scientific classification
- Kingdom: Animalia
- Phylum: Chordata
- Class: Amphibia
- Order: Anura
- Family: Telmatobiidae
- Genus: Telmatobius
- Species: T. schreiteri

Binomial name
- Telmatobius schreiteri Vellard, 1946

Species of frog

The La Rioja water frog (Telmatobius schreiteri) is a species of frog in the family Telmatobiidae. It is endemic to Argentina.

== Habitat ==
This fully aquatic frog has been observed between 1800 and 2050 meters above sea level.

== Reproduction ==
This frog breeds in permanent streams high in the mountains.

== Threats ==
The IUCN and Argentina's National Red List both classify this frog as endangered. Introduced fish, particularly trout, can kill this species. Pollution from mines and livestock can also hurt the frog. The removal of streamside vegetation increases runoff. Scientists consider the fungal disease chytridiomycosis a possible future threat.
