= Telmatobius brevirostris =

Conservation status
- Endangered (IUCN 3.1)

Scientific classification
- Kingdom: Animalia
- Phylum: Chordata
- Class: Amphibia
- Order: Anura
- Family: Telmatobiidae
- Genus: Telmatobius
- Species: T. brevirostris

Binomial name
- Telmatobius brevirostris Vellard, 1955

Synonyms
- Telmatobius brevirostris ssp. parvulus Vellard, 1955; Telmatobius brevirostris ssp. punctatus Vellard, 1955

Species of frog

Telmatobius brevirostris is a species of frog in the family Telmatobiidae. It is endemic to Peru.

== Habitat ==
This semi-aquatic, riparian stream-breeding frog has been found in streams in montane cloud forests and shrublands. Generally, this species is not found in cultivated areas.Scientists observed this frog between 2000 and 3600 meters above sea level. Notably, the frog has been seen in the forests of Region Huánuco, which is located in central Peru.

== Morphology ==
Compared to similar frog species like Telmatobius mendelsoni, Telmatobius brevirostris is smaller in size. The frog’s lower belly is pale gray or green in color with orange blotches evident.

== Reproduction ==
Telmatobius brevirostris is presumed to breed by larval development in streams, though there is little observational data of this. Their population is declining which indicates decreased reproduction trends. A study published in 2010 described their tadpoles in detail. Their tadpoles have a round snout and depressed body; their lateral line organs can be seen at high magnification when looking dorsally and laterally. At larval stage 34 the tadpole was 63.6mm in length

== Threats ==
The IUCN and scientist from Peru both classify this frog as endangered. Agrochemical pollution, as a result of potato cultivation, enters streams and causes illness and deformity. Scientists also believe that the fungal disease chytridiomycosis can kill this frog, but they have yet to report the fungus Batrachochytrium dendrobatidis on individuals from this species. Though frogs of the same genus are known to have contracted the fungal disease. Human beings also catch the frog for food and use in medicine, causing a greater threat.

== Conservation ==
In Peru, Telmatobius brevirostris is considered a critically endangered animal, this protects the frog from being captured and hunted listed under the Categorization of Endangered Species of Wild Fauna. Despite this, it is not known to be in any protected areas.
