= Telmatobius oxycephalus =

Conservation status
- Endangered (IUCN 3.1)

Scientific classification
- Kingdom: Animalia
- Phylum: Chordata
- Class: Amphibia
- Order: Anura
- Family: Telmatobiidae
- Genus: Telmatobius
- Species: T. oxycephalus

Binomial name
- Telmatobius oxycephalus Vellard, 1946

Synonyms
- Telmatobius barrioi Laurent, 1970 "1969"

Species of frog

Telmatobius oxycephalus or the red-headed water frog is a species of frog in the family Telmatobiidae. It is endemic to Argentina.

== Habitat ==
This relatively aquatic frog lives in streams in Yungas forests, Yungas grasslands, and other biomes. Scientists observed this frog between 1400 and 2980 meters above sea level.

Scientists have seen this frog one protected park: Parque Nacional Calilegua.

== Relationship to humans ==
People catch and eat some Telmatobius frogs, but scientists have not recorded human beings eating Telmatobius oxycephalus.

== Threats ==
The IUCN classifies this frog as endangered. Introduced fish prey upon this frog, and tourism can disrupt its habitat. Human beings also divert water for canals, irrigation, and goat husbandry. Scientists believe the fungal disease chytridiomycosis also poses a threat.
