= Telmatobius ignavus =

Conservation status
- Endangered (IUCN 3.1)

Scientific classification
- Kingdom: Animalia
- Phylum: Chordata
- Class: Amphibia
- Order: Anura
- Family: Telmatobiidae
- Genus: Telmatobius
- Species: T. ignavus

Binomial name
- Telmatobius ignavus Barbour and Noble, 1920

Species of frog

Telmatobius ignavus is a species of frog in the family Telmatobiidae. It is endemic to the Cordillera de Huancabamba (an isolated mountain ridge within the Huancabamba Depression) in the Department of Piura, Peru. Common name Piura water frog has been coined for it.

== Description ==
Males can grow to 75 mm (3.0 in) and females to 79 mm (3.1 in) in snout–vent length. The head is wider than it is long and as wide or slightly narrower than the body. Unusually for Telmatobius of northern Peru, tympanum is present, albeit largely concealed posteriorly and dorsally by the robust supratympanic fold. The toes are webbed whereas the fingers are not. Skin is smooth. The dorsum is dull tan, olive-tan, or brown with dark brown, olive-brown, or olive-green spots. The venter is dull tan, dull gray, or grayish brown. The iris is bronze and has black reticulations.

== Habitat and conservation ==
Telmatobius ignavus is a semi-aquatic frog that and can be found under rocks in streams and associated pools in very humid montane forest, humid lower montane forest, grassland, and possibly dry lower montane forest at elevations of 1,840–3,080 m (6,040–10,100 ft) above sea level. The tadpoles inhabit rocky and muddy pools as well as rocky streams. The diet includes various insects.

This species tolerates some habitat disturbance, provided that water quality remains good. However, it is an uncommon species that is suspected to be declining. Possible threats include habitat loss (stream degradation caused by agricultural activities), chytridiomycosis, and harvesting for human consumption and medicinal uses. It is a protected species in Peru, but it is not known to occur in any protected areas.
