= Telmatobius hauthali =

Conservation status
- Endangered (IUCN 3.1)

Scientific classification
- Kingdom: Animalia
- Phylum: Chordata
- Class: Amphibia
- Order: Anura
- Family: Telmatobiidae
- Genus: Telmatobius
- Species: T. hauthali

Binomial name
- Telmatobius hauthali Koslowsky, 1895

Synonyms
- Telmatobius Hauthali Koslowsky, 1895; Telmatobius hauthali hauthali Vellard, 1951

Species of frog

Telmatobius hauthali is a species of frog in the family Telmatobiidae. It is endemic to Argentina.

== Home ==
This frog is heavily aquatic. Scientists found it at exactly one site, a geothermal spring in Argentina's Catamarca Province, 4020 meters above sea level. Scientists have not found this frog in any protected parks.

== Reproduction ==
This frog has young streams.

== Threats ==
Both the IUCN and the Argentine National Red List classify this frog as endangered. Principal threats include introduced predators, such as trout. People also allow livestock to drink from the spring where the frog lives, and they trample the vegetation that the frogs rely on. Scientists consider the fungal disease chytridiomycosis a potential future threat.
