= Telmatobius philippii =

Conservation status
- Critically Endangered (IUCN 3.1)

Scientific classification
- Kingdom: Animalia
- Phylum: Chordata
- Class: Amphibia
- Order: Anura
- Family: Telmatobiidae
- Genus: Telmatobius
- Species: T. philippii

Binomial name
- Telmatobius philippii Cuevas & Formas, 2002

Species of frog

Telmatobius philippii is a species of frog in the family Telmatobiidae. It is endemic to Chile and to Bolivia.

== Habitat ==
Scientists observed this aquatic frog in streams high in the Andes mountains, between 3710 and 4100 meters above sea level.

== Threats ==
The IUCN classifies this frog as critically endangered. Human beings caused intense habitat loss by abstracting water for direct and agricultural use.
