= Telmatobius latirostris =

Conservation status
- Endangered (IUCN 3.1)

Scientific classification
- Kingdom: Animalia
- Phylum: Chordata
- Class: Amphibia
- Order: Anura
- Family: Telmatobiidae
- Genus: Telmatobius
- Species: T. latirostris

Binomial name
- Telmatobius latirostris Vellard, 1951

Species of frog

Telmatobius latirostris is a species of frog in the family Telmatobiidae. It is endemic to Peru.

== Habitat ==
This semi-aquatic frog lives and breeds in streams. This frog was observed 2620 meters above sea level.

Scientists suspect this frog might live in one protected park, Parque Nacional Cutervo, but its presence there is not confirmed. Peru is establishing other protected areas nearby.

== Threats ==
This frog is classified as endangered by the IUCN and the government of Peru. It is threatened by habitat loss in favor of cattle grazing and agriculture and by water pollution. Scientists also believe the fungus Batrachochytrium dendrobatidis poses a threat to this species through the fungal disease chytridiomycosis.
