= Telmatobius pefauri =

Arica Water Frog

Conservation status
- Critically Endangered (IUCN 3.1)

Scientific classification
- Kingdom: Animalia
- Phylum: Chordata
- Class: Amphibia
- Order: Anura
- Family: Telmatobiidae
- Genus: Telmatobius
- Species: T. pefauri

Binomial name
- Telmatobius pefauri Veloso and Trueb, 1976

Synonyms
- Telmatobius zapahuirensis Veloso, Sallaberry-Ayerza, Navarro, Iturra-Constant, Valencia, Penna, and Diaz, 1982

Species of amphibian

Telmatobius pefauri is a species of frog in the family Telmatobiidae. It is endemic to extreme northern Chile. It was already feared that this species is extinct, but recent research has suggested that the species is extant at several localities in the Arica y Parinacota Region, albeit at low numbers. Furthermore, morphological and genetic data suggest that Telmatobius zapahuirensis is a synonym of Telmatobius pefauri. Common name Arica water frog has been coined for this species.

The type locality of Telmatobius pefauri is the village of Murmuntani in northern Chile. Other records are from the same area.

== Etymology ==
The specific name pefauri honours Jaime Eduardo Péfaur Vega, a Chilean ecologist and herpetologist and colleague of the authors who described the species.

== Description ==
The holotype, an adult female, measured 75 mm (3.0 in) in snout–vent length. The head is large and the body is robust. The eyes are relatively large, positioned far forward on the head, and oriented forward. The tympanum is not visible. The fingers are long and have lateral fringes but no webbing. The hind limbs are long, with long and moderately webbed toes. The dorsal skin is smooth apart from few, scattered tubercles. However, the flanks have many small tubercles. Dorsal coloration is olive-brown with distinct, darker brown spots and mottling; the ventral surfaces are grayish white, while the anterior surfaces of thighs yellow-orange.

Recent specimens show variation in color pattern both between and within localities. Most specimens are olive-brown to light brown. Darker mottling is often present, as are small cream or light grey spots. However, one specimen had a golden brown dorsum without mottling. All newly collected specimens have also been smaller than the holotype, with two females measuring 48 and 57 mm (1.9 and 2.2 in) and one male 47 mm (1.9 in) in snout–vent length.

== Habitat and conservation ==
The type locality is a small high-altitude (3,200 m (10,500 ft) above sea level) stream without vegetation. The species is fully aquatic; the holotype was found at night underwater in a half-meter deep stream pool.

In 2015, Telmatobius pefauri was assessed as "critically endangered, possibly extinct", and Telmatobius zapahuirensis as"critically endangered". Telmatobius pefauri is threatened by habitat loss extraction of water from streams for cattle ranching and human use. Cattle might also impact the streams. While the understanding on the distribution of Telmatobius pefauri has changed since the assessment, the number of known localities is low, local population densities are generally low, and water extraction for agricultural use remains a threat.
