= Telmatobius carrillae =

Ancash water frog

Conservation status
- Vulnerable (IUCN 3.1)

Scientific classification
- Kingdom: Animalia
- Phylum: Chordata
- Class: Amphibia
- Order: Anura
- Family: Telmatobiidae
- Genus: Telmatobius
- Species: T. carrillae

Binomial name
- Telmatobius carrillae Morales, 1988

Species of frog

The Ancash water frog (Telmatobius carrillae) is a species of frog in the family Telmatobiidae. It is endemic to Peru.

== Habitat ==
This frog lives in riparian areas in puna habitats and in slow-flowing rivers. Scientists observed this frog between 3680 and 4818 meters above sea level.

Scientists have not observed the frog in any protected parks but they believe it might live in Huascarán National Park.

== Reproduction ==
The frog reproduces in streams and rivers. Scientists believe this frog has young all year because they have seen tadpoles in various stages of development at the same time.

== Relationship to humans ==
People catch frogs in Telmatobius to sell and eat.

== Threats ==
The IUCN classifies this frog as vulnerable to extinction. Water pollution from mines can harm this frog. Scientists believe the fungal disease chytridiomycosis could also kill the frog, but they have not reported the causitive fungus Batrachochytrium dendrobatidis on the species yet.
