= Telmatobius hockingi =

Conservation status
- Data Deficient (IUCN 3.1)

Scientific classification
- Kingdom: Animalia
- Phylum: Chordata
- Class: Amphibia
- Order: Anura
- Family: Telmatobiidae
- Genus: Telmatobius
- Species: T. hockingi

Binomial name
- Telmatobius hockingi Salas & Sinsch, 1996

Species of frog

Telmatobius hockingi is a species of frog in the family Telmatobiidae. It is endemic to Peru.

== Habitat ==
Scientists observed this semi-aquatic frog under rocks in fast-flowing streams in an alder forest 2700 meters above sea level.

== Relationship to humans ==
People catch other frogs in Telmatobius to eat, sell, and use in traditional medicine.

== Threats ==
The IUCN classifies this species as data deficient. They believe it may be in danger from habitat loss associated with deforestation in favor of agriculture and irrigation. Scientists believe the fungal disease chytridiomycosis might kill this frog because it has killed other frogs in Telmatobius, but they have not yet reported the fungus Batrachochytrium dendrobatidis on any frogs in this species.
