= Telmatobius stephani =

Conservation status
- Endangered (IUCN 3.1)

Scientific classification
- Kingdom: Animalia
- Phylum: Chordata
- Class: Amphibia
- Order: Anura
- Family: Telmatobiidae
- Genus: Telmatobius
- Species: T. stephani

Binomial name
- Telmatobius stephani Laurent, 1973

Species of frog

Stephen's water frog, or Telmatobius stephani, is a species of frog in the family Telmatobiidae. It is endemic to Argentina.

== Habitat ==
This aquatic species lives and breeds in rivulets in Yungas forest. Scientists have observed the frog between 2200 and 2300 meters above sea level.

== Relationship to humans ==
People catch other frogs in Telmatobius to eat and make into medicine, but they do not appear to make use of this species in that way.

== Threats ==
Both the IUCN and the Argentina National Red List classify this animal as endangered. The principal threat is introduced fish, most notably trout. Habitat loss in favor of agriculture and logging also pose some threat. Mining and the fungal disease chytridiomycosis are possible threats.
