= Telmatobius platycephalus =

Conservation status
- Endangered (IUCN 3.1)

Scientific classification
- Kingdom: Animalia
- Phylum: Chordata
- Class: Amphibia
- Order: Anura
- Family: Telmatobiidae
- Genus: Telmatobius
- Species: T. platycephalus

Binomial name
- Telmatobius platycephalus Lavilla & Laurent, 1989 "1988"

Species of frog

Telmatobius platycephalus is a species of frog in the family Telmatobiidae. It is endemic to Argentina.

== Habitat ==
This fully aquatic frog lives streams in puna habitats. Scientists observed this frog between 3600 and 3750 meters above sea level.

== Threats ==
The IUCN classifies this species as endangered and the Argentinean National Red List classifies it as vulnerable. The principal threats are water pollution in the form of runoff from mines and grazing areas and introduced fish, for example trout. Scientists believe the fungal disease chytridiomycosis might kill this frog in the future, but they have not yet detected the causitive fungus on any specimens from this species. It has killed other frogs in Telmatobius, however.
