= Telmatobius contrerasi =

Conservation status
- Endangered (IUCN 3.1)

Scientific classification
- Kingdom: Animalia
- Phylum: Chordata
- Class: Amphibia
- Order: Anura
- Family: Telmatobiidae
- Genus: Telmatobius
- Species: T. contrerasi

Binomial name
- Telmatobius contrerasi Cei, 1977

Species of frog

Telmatobius contrerasi is a species of frog in the family Telmatobiidae. It is endemic to Argentina.

== Home ==
Scientists believe someone caught this frog in a mountain stream.

== Relationship to humans ==
While people harvest other frogs in Telmatobius for use in food and in medicine, they do not appear to catch this frog.

== Threats ==
Both the IUCN and the Argentina National Red List classify this frog as endangered. There are gold mining operations near the frog's habitat, so scientists believe mercury may be polluting the streams. Cows also graze and trample the streams. Scientists consider the fungal disease chytridiomycosis a future threat.
