= Telmatobius pisanoi =

Conservation status
- Endangered (IUCN 3.1)

Scientific classification
- Kingdom: Animalia
- Phylum: Chordata
- Class: Amphibia
- Order: Anura
- Family: Telmatobiidae
- Genus: Telmatobius
- Species: T. pisanoi

Binomial name
- Telmatobius pisanoi Laurent, 1977

Species of frog

Telmatobius pisanoi is a species of frog in the family Telmatobiidae. It is endemic to Argentina.

== Habitat ==
This frog spends almost all its time in the water. It lives in bog streams places with small woody plants. It does not live in places that human beings have changed. Scientists saw this frog between 3600 and 4200 meters above sea level.

== Relationship to humans ==
Between 1949 and 1989, scientists used this frog in laboratories to study such subjects as karyotyping, embryology, endocrinology, and larval development. Scientists have ceased this practice on this species.

People harvest other frogs in Telmatobius to eat and make into medicine, but not this species.

== Threats ==
Scientists from the IUCN and from the Argentina National Red List classify this frog as endangered. Overgrazing in their habitat, landslides, the driving of four-wheel-drive vehicles through the bogs, conversion of streams to canals, changes in weather and rainfall, the burning of pastureland, and predation by introduced fish, such as trout, can kill this species. Scientists no longer use this frog in laboratories, but it may have been a threat in the past.

Scientists found the fungus Batrachochytrium dendrobatidis on one dead frog in 2006, so they believe the fungal disease chytridiomycosis may also kill this frog.
