= Telmatobius truebae =

Conservation status
- Vulnerable (IUCN 3.1)

Scientific classification
- Kingdom: Animalia
- Phylum: Chordata
- Class: Amphibia
- Order: Anura
- Family: Telmatobiidae
- Genus: Telmatobius
- Species: T. truebae

Binomial name
- Telmatobius truebae Wiens, 1993

Species of frog

Telmatobius truebae is a species of frog in the family Telmatobiidae. It is endemic to Peru.

== Description ==
The adult male frog can reach 68.9 mm in snout-vent length and the adult female 82.0 mm. The skin of the dorsum is brown, gray, or olive-green. Some individuals have spots and some do not. The skin of the ventrum has many warts. The belly is gray in color with some yellow or lavender pigmentation on the undersides of the legs. The iris of the eye is gold in color with black spots.

== Habitat ==
Scientists observed this semi-aquatic frog in mountain forests and puna habitats. It lives in riparian habitats in the Cordillera Occidental. They saw it between 2150 and 3600 meters above sea level.

Scientists believe the frog may live in Los Chilchos Conservation Area, Tilacancha Private Conservation Area, or both.

== Relationship to humans ==
People catch other species in the genus Telmatobius for food, so scientists believe they may eat T. truebae as well.

== Young ==
This frog has reproduces in streams. Scientists observed tadpoles from January to March.

The tadpole can reach 75.2 mm long with the tail and 29.5 mm body alone at stage 35. The tadpoles are olive-brown in color with green or black marks. The belly is gray with some lavendar pigmentation anteriorly. The fins are translucent with some brown spots. The iris of the eye is light yellow in color.
