= Telmatobius colanensis =

Conservation status
- Data Deficient (IUCN 3.1)

Scientific classification
- Kingdom: Animalia
- Phylum: Chordata
- Class: Amphibia
- Order: Anura
- Family: Telmatobiidae
- Genus: Telmatobius
- Species: T. colanensis

Binomial name
- Telmatobius colanensis Wiens, 1993

Species of frog

Telmatobius colanensis is a species of frog in the family Telmatobiidae. It is endemic to northern Peru and only known from its type locality on the Cordillera Colán, near La Peca, Amazonas Region.

== Body ==
The adult frog can reach 62.5 mm in snout-vent length. The skin of the dorsum is gray or brown in color with small dark marks. The belly is yellow in color with gray or brown spots.

== Habitat ==
T. colanensis is a riparian, semiaquatic frog living in rocky high-gradient streams in undisturbed cloud forest. It is present in the Cordillera de Colán National Sanctuary. Scientists observed it near 2410 meters above sea level.

== Threats ==
The IUCN classifies this frog as data deficient. Threats in areas outside their protected type locality may include deforestation. Scientists believe the fungal disease chytridiomycosis may pose a threat because it has killed other frogs in Telmatobius, but they have not reported the fungus Batrachochytrium dendrobatidis on the individuals of this species yet.

== Original description ==
- Wiens, J.J. (1993). "Systematics of the leptodactylid frog genus Telmatobius in the Andes of northern Peru". Occ. Papers of the Museum of Natural History, University of Kansas. 162: 1–76.
