= Telmatobius sibiricus =

Conservation status
- Critically Endangered (IUCN 3.1)

Scientific classification
- Kingdom: Animalia
- Phylum: Chordata
- Class: Amphibia
- Order: Anura
- Family: Telmatobiidae
- Genus: Telmatobius
- Species: T. sibiricus

Binomial name
- Telmatobius sibiricus De la Riva & Harvey, 2003

Species of amphibian

Telmatobius sibiricus is a species of frogs in the family Telmatobiidae. It is endemic to Bolivia.

== Habitat ==
This frog is largely terrestrial. Scientists found it near streams in cloud forests high in the mountains and near small rivers in cattle pastures. The scientists saw the frog between 2000 and 2900 meters above sea level.

This frog has been reported in two protected places: Parque Nacional Carrasco and Parque Nacional Amboró. Scientists last saw it in Parque Nacional Amboró in the late 20th century and they last saw it in Parque Nacional Carrasco before 2019.

== Threats ==
The IUCN classifies this frog as critically endangered, with no more than 249 mature adults alive at the one time. The population underwent a precipitous decline in recent years, even in undisturbed habitats. Scientists believe the fungal disease chytridiomycosis killed the frogs because it has shown a similar pattern with other high-elevation, stream-dwelling frogs in northern South America. They detected the fungus Batrachochytrium dendrobatidis on T. sibiricus specimens. The frogs are also threatened by human-induced habitat loss in favor of wood extraction and agriculture. Water pollution also poses a threat.
