= Telmatobius brevipes =

Conservation status
- Vulnerable (IUCN 3.1)

Scientific classification
- Kingdom: Animalia
- Phylum: Chordata
- Class: Amphibia
- Order: Anura
- Family: Telmatobiidae
- Genus: Telmatobius
- Species: T. brevipes

Binomial name
- Telmatobius brevipes Vellard, 1951

Species of frog

Telmatobius brevipes is a species of frog in the family Telmatobiidae. It is endemic to Peru. Its natural habitats are subtropical or tropical moist montane forest, subtropical or tropical high-altitude shrubland, subtropical or tropical high-altitude grassland, rivers, arable land, and canals and ditches.

== Geographic distribution ==
It is found in Peru; it is a species present in the western cordillera, in the departments of Cajamarca and La Libertad, between 2000 and 4300 m altitude.

== Young ==
Scientists observed eggs that they attribute to this species stuck to plants in a small rivulet. They believe they found the frog's tadpoles in slow-moving streams, pools, grassy ponds, and in ditches. The tadpoles ate invertebrates and sometimes other tadpoles.

== Threats ==
Contamination of water bodies can be a local threat. Other species of the same genus found at high altitudes are very susceptible to chytridiomycosis, so it is inferred that this disease is a threat to Telmatobius brevipes. Human beings may catch this frog to eat, but its small size makes it less desirable than its larger congeners.
