= Telmatobius rimac =

Conservation status
- Vulnerable (IUCN 3.1)

Scientific classification
- Kingdom: Animalia
- Phylum: Chordata
- Class: Amphibia
- Order: Anura
- Family: Telmatobiidae
- Genus: Telmatobius
- Species: T. rimac

Binomial name
- Telmatobius rimac Schmidt, 1954

Synonyms
- Telmatobius rimac ssp. meridionalis Vellard, 1955

Species of frog

Telmatobius rimac is a species of frog in the family Telmatobiidae. It is endemic to Peru.

== Habitat ==
This semi-aquatic frog has been found in streams, ditches, and canals in riparian areas. Scientists have seen it between 2000 and 4000 meters above sea level.

Scientists have observed this frog one protected park: Nor Yauyos-Cochas Landscape Reserve.

== Reproduction ==
This frog's tadpoles have been observed in streams with considerable underwater vegetation.

== Threats ==
This frog is vulnerable to extinction. Threats include agrarian and domestic water pollution. Scientists also suspect chytridiomycosis, which has killed other high-altitude frogs in South America. Human beings harvest this frog to eat, but scientists are not certain whether this constitutes a threat.
