= Telmatobius jelskii =

Conservation status
- Near Threatened (IUCN 3.1)

Scientific classification
- Kingdom: Animalia
- Phylum: Chordata
- Class: Amphibia
- Order: Anura
- Family: Telmatobiidae
- Genus: Telmatobius
- Species: T. jelskii

Binomial name
- Telmatobius jelskii (Peters, 1873)

Species of amphibian

Telmatobius jelskii, also known as the Acancocha water frog, is a near-threatened species of frog in the family Telmatobiidae, endemic to the Andes of central Peru.

== Habitat ==
This semiaquatic frog is found in and near streams and ditches at altitudes of 2,700–4,500 m (8,900–14,800 ft).

Scientists have observed this frog in one protected park: National Reserve of Pampa Galeras. They believe it might also live in Nor Yauyos-Cochas Landscape Reserve.

== Reproduction ==
This frog breeds in streams, springs, and rivers, preferring slow-moving, shallow water.

== Threats ==
The IUCN classifies this frog as near threatened and scientists from Peru classify it as vulnerable within Peru. Its principal threats are habitat loss associated with water pollution and water extraction for human use. Scientists have detected the fungus Batrachochytrium dendrobatidis, the causative pathogen of the fungal disease chytridiomycosis on as many as 50% of the frogs in a given population. People also capture this frog to eat and use in medicine.
