= Telmatobius edaphonastes =

Conservation status
- Critically Endangered (IUCN 3.1)

Scientific classification
- Kingdom: Animalia
- Phylum: Chordata
- Class: Amphibia
- Order: Anura
- Family: Telmatobiidae
- Genus: Telmatobius
- Species: T. edaphonastes

Binomial name
- Telmatobius edaphonastes De la Riva, 1994

Species of frog

Telmatobius edaphonastes is a species of frog in the family Telmatobiidae. It is endemic to Bolivia.

== Habitat ==
This frog is both aquatic and terrestrial. Scientists found it in stream habitats in cloud forests in the Cordillera Oriental mountains between 2480 and 2600 meters above sea level.

The frog has been found in one protected place: Parque Nacional Carrasco. Scientists believe it may also live in Parque Nacional Amboró.

== Threats ==
The IUCN classifies this frog as critically endangered with no more than 249 mature adults alive at any one time. The last official sighting wasin 1999. Principal threats include habitat loss in favor of agriculture, logging, human habitation, and at least one hydroelectric dam project. Because the frog's population underwent a sudden, steep decline at around the same time as other frogs in the area who were succumbing to the fungal disease chytridiomycosis, they believe chytridiomycosis may be responsible for this species' decline as well. Scientists detected the causative fungus Batrachochytrium dendrobatidis on one frog in this species in 1989.
