= Telmatobius bolivianus =

Conservation status
- Critically Endangered (IUCN 3.1)

Scientific classification
- Kingdom: Animalia
- Phylum: Chordata
- Class: Amphibia
- Order: Anura
- Family: Telmatobiidae
- Genus: Telmatobius
- Species: T. bolivianus

Binomial name
- Telmatobius bolivianus Parker, 1940

Synonyms
- Telmatobius ifornoi Lavilla & Ergueta-Sandoval, 1999

Species of frog

Telmatobius bolivianus is a species of frog in the family Telmatobiidae. It is endemic to the Eastern Andes of Bolivia.

== Habitat ==
This is an aquatic frog occurring in fast-flowing rivers and streams in cloud forest and Yungas forest. Scientists observed this frog between 2000 and 3100 meters above sea level.

Scientists have seen this frog in some protected parks: Parque Nacional y Área Natural de Manejo Integrado Cotapata and Área Natural de Manejo Integrado Nacional Apolobamba.

== Conservation and threats ==
It was formerly the most common and widespread Telmatobius of Bolivia, but has had a drastic population decline since the mid-2000s. It is threatened by chytridomycosis as well as habitat loss caused by logging and agricultural expansion. Water pollution and aquaculture are also threats.

== Scientific description ==
- De la Riva, I; et al. (2005). "Bolivian frogs of the genus Telmatobius: synopsis, taxonomic comments and description of a new species". Rev Herp Esp Monogr Herpetolog (Reaffirmation). 7: 65–101.
