= Telmatobius laticeps =

Conservation status
- Critically endangered, possibly extinct (IUCN 3.1)

Scientific classification
- Kingdom: Animalia
- Phylum: Chordata
- Class: Amphibia
- Order: Anura
- Family: Telmatobiidae
- Genus: Telmatobius
- Species: T. laticeps

Binomial name
- Telmatobius laticeps Laurent, 1977

Species of frog

Telmatobius laticeps is a species of frog in the family Telmatobiidae. It is endemic to Argentina.

== Relationship to humans ==
Between 1949 and 1989, scientists used this frog in laboratories to study endocrinology, karyotyping, larval development, and other things.

== Habitat ==
This fully aquatic frog lives in streams that flow near and through bogs, grassy places, and areas with scattered trees but not deep forest. Scientists observed this frog between 1,900 and 3,100 metres (6,200 and 10,200 ft) above sea level.

== Young ==
The female frog lays between 80 and 500 eggs per clutch.

== Threats ==
The IUCN classifies this frog as critically endangered, with no more than 49 adult individuals alive at any given time. Introduced fish, for example trout, may have killed these frogs. People also cause habitat loss in favor of urbanization, grazing, agriculture, infrastructure, such as power cables. People also divert streams to make canals. Scientists also found what appeared to be tadpoles with chytridiomycosis-induced deformities, so they believe this species may be among the lethal fungal disease's many hosts.
