= Telmatobius ceiorum =

Conservation status
- Critically Endangered (IUCN 3.1)

Scientific classification
- Kingdom: Animalia
- Phylum: Chordata
- Class: Amphibia
- Order: Anura
- Family: Telmatobiidae
- Genus: Telmatobius
- Species: T. ceiorum

Binomial name
- Telmatobius ceiorum Laurent, 1970 "1969"

Species of frog

Telmatobius ceiorum or Catamarca water frog is a species of frog in the family Telmatobiidae, and which is endemic to Argentina.

== Habitat ==
This frog is classified as aquatic but may not spend as much time in the water as other aquatic frogs in Telmatobius. It lives in streams in montane cloud forests. Scientists know it from the east side of Cumbres Calchaquíes and Nevados del Aconquija, between 1500 and 2200 meters above sea level.

This frog is known in one protected place, Parque Nacional Los Alisos.

== Young ==
This frog breeds in streams.

== Threats ==
The IUCN classifies this frog as critically endangered. The principal threat is predation from introduced fish, such as trout. Pollution from mines and livestock and habitat loss associated with logging and human-induced changes in waterways also pose significant threats. Scientists believe the fungus Batrachochytrium dendrobatidis and the disease chytridiomycosis could also kill this frog.
