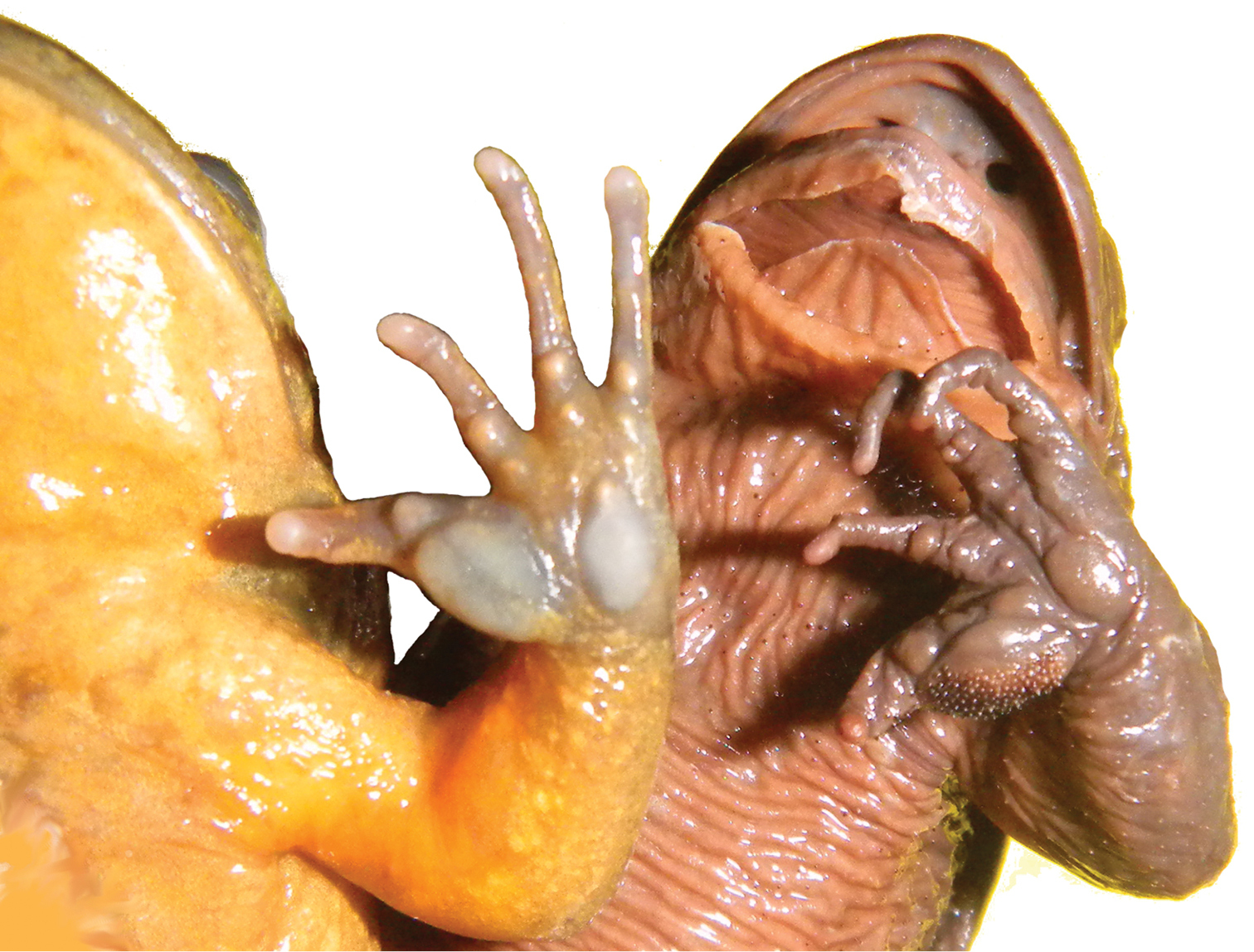

Conservation status
- Endangered (IUCN 3.1)

Scientific classification
- Kingdom: Animalia
- Phylum: Chordata
- Class: Amphibia
- Order: Anura
- Family: Telmatobiidae
- Genus: Telmatobius
- Species: T. intermedius

Binomial name
- Telmatobius intermedius Vellard, 1951

= Telmatobius intermedius =

Species of frog

Telmatobius intermedius is a species of frog in the family Telmatobiidae. It is endemic to Peru.

== Habitat ==
Its natural habitats are streams in subtropical or tropical high-altitude shrubland and subtropical or tropical high-altitude grassland. Scientists observed this frog between 2860 and 3300 meters above sea level.

Scientists have found this frog in one protected park: Reserva Nacional Pampas Galeras.

== Young ==
This species breeds in streams through larval development.

== Threats ==
The IUCN classifies this frog as endangered and the government of Peru classifies it as data deficient. The streams where it lives have slow currents and considerable contamination from livestock waste, but it seems to have some tolerance to this. The frog is also harvested for human consumption. Scientists also believe the fungal disease chytridiomycosis, which has killed many frogs in South America, may also be a threat.
