= Telmatobius gigas =

Conservation status
- Endangered (IUCN 3.1)

Scientific classification
- Kingdom: Animalia
- Phylum: Chordata
- Class: Amphibia
- Order: Anura
- Family: Telmatobiidae
- Genus: Telmatobius
- Species: T. gigas

Binomial name
- Telmatobius gigas Vellard, 1969

Species of amphibian

Telmatobius gigas is an Endangered species of frog in the family Telmatobiidae.

== Habitat ==
It is endemic to the Huayllamarca River area. Scientists have observed it between 3,765 metres (12,352 ft) and 4,450 metres (14,600 ft) above sea level in Carangas Province in Bolivia. Its tiny range makes it highly vulnerable to pollution, and it may also be threatened by over-harvesting for medicinal use and the disease chytridiomycosis.

== Description ==
As suggested by its scientific name, this is a very large species of frog with a snout-vent length of up to 10.9 centimetres (4.3 in) in females (males are smaller). In the genus Telmatobius, only two other threatened species, the Titicaca water frog (T. culeus) and Lake Junin frog (T. macrostomus), are larger.

The coloration of dorsum varies, scientists believe along gender lines: Females are olive-green in color with dark spots on top of green bumps while males are brown with other marks. The flanks are beige with beige-yellow bumps. The belly is cream-white in color with gray dots.

== Young ==
This frog's tadpoles are the largest of any Telmatobius species. The largest tadpoles recorded was 109 mm long at stage 38. The tadpole has a round snoute with large papillae around the mouth.

== Taxonomy ==
T. gigas is very closely related to the smaller and more widespread T. marmoratus, and they might be conspecific.

== Threats ==
The IUCN classifies this species as Endangered. The most significant threat is water diversion for agriculture, though water pollution with agrochemicals is likely to be another. Human beings do collect this frog for use in medicine, so overharvesting may also pose some threat. Scientists have detected the deadly fungus Batrachochytrium dendrobatidis on specimens of this species, but the disease chytridiomycosis has not killed them all yet.
