= Telmatobius timens =

Conservation status
- Critically Endangered (IUCN 3.1)

Scientific classification
- Kingdom: Animalia
- Phylum: Chordata
- Class: Amphibia
- Order: Anura
- Family: Telmatobiidae
- Genus: Telmatobius
- Species: T. timens

Binomial name
- Telmatobius timens De la Riva, Aparicio & Ríos, 2005

Species of amphibian

Telmatobius timens is a species of frogs in the family Telmatobiidae. It is found in western Bolivia and southeastern Peru at elevations of 3,350–3,750 m (10,990–12,300 ft) asl.

== Habitat ==
Scientists found the frog in Valle de Tojologue in La Paz, but they believe it lives in other areas as well. They saw this frog in humid puna grassland, elfin forest, Polylepis forest, scrubland edges, and in some cloud forests. Tadpoles develop in streams.

Scientists saw this frog in some protected places: Área Natural de Manejo Integrado Nacional Apolobamba, Parque Nacional Manu, Santuario Nacional Meganton, and Santuario Nacional Machu Picchu.

== Threats ==
The IUCN and the government of Peru both list this species as critically endangered, and it is included on Bolivia's Red List of Threatened Vertebrates. Because the population had a precipitous decline in recent years, scientists believe it to be threatened by chytridiomycosis. The fungal disease has had similar effects on other high-altitude, stream-dwelling frogs in South America, and scientists found the causitive fungus Batrachochytrium dendrobatidis on some T. timens specimens. Intensive livestock cultivation in the frog's habitat also poses a significant threat, largely through the resulting water pollution.

== Original description ==
- De la Riva I; Aparicio J; Rios JN (2005). "New species of Telmatobius (Anura: Leptodactylidae) from humid paramo of Peru and Bolivia". J. Herpetol. 39 (3): 409–416. doi:10.1670/178-84A.1.
