= Telmatobius espadai =

Inquisivi water frog

Conservation status
- Critically Endangered (IUCN 3.1)

Scientific classification
- Kingdom: Animalia
- Phylum: Chordata
- Class: Amphibia
- Order: Anura
- Family: Telmatobiidae
- Genus: Telmatobius
- Species: T. espadai

Binomial name
- Telmatobius espadai De la Riva, 2005

Species of amphibian

Telmatobius espadai, also known as the Inquisivi water frog, is a species of frogs in the family Telmatobiidae, one of fourteen species of Telmatobius water frogs endemic to Bolivia.

== Description ==
This small water frog has greenish-brown skin, speckled with black and yellow flecks, and is well camouflaged as it sits under tree roots or stones. On close inspection it is possible to see that its rather robust body has many small bumps, known as pustules, on the back. The undersides of the legs are orange, and the underbelly and throat are grey. The hind legs are long and slender, suited to propelling the frog through water, and its feet are only partially webbed, indicating that it spends part of its life on land. Juveniles of this species are greener than adults with more yellow flecks.

== Range and habitat ==
Telmatobius espadai occurs only in Bolivia, where it has been found in just two areas: the Rio Miguillas valley near Choquetanga Chico, in the department of La Paz, and near Rio Apaza, in the department of Cochabamba.

An inhabitant of clear streams in the upper limits of cloud forest, this water frog occurs at 3,000–3,500 metres (9,800–11,500 ft) above sea level. Adults are generally found resting above the water sheltered by tree trunks and stones, whilst tadpoles and juveniles have been found hidden under stones and amongst aquatic plants.

== Biology ==
Little is known about the biology of this extremely rare species, which is thought to live a partially terrestrial life. The tadpole possesses a large oral sucker, a unique feature amongst Telmatobius water frogs. The function of this sucker has not yet been determined, although it is possible it may help the tadpole cling on to surfaces to prevent it from being swept away by currents, or it could even be used to suck up prey.

== Conservation ==
Telmatobius espadai is now extremely rare; a population census undertaken in 1998 found just one tadpole. This tadpole showed symptoms of chytridiomycosis, a disease that causes death in frogs and is thought to contribute to declines, and even extinctions, in frog species around the world. There are also significant concerns over the possible effects of a road situated very near to one of the locations where the frog has been located. In addition, various species of water frog are sometimes consumed as part of drink with supposed aphrodisiac qualities, and this may also have contributed to the decline of this species.

Despite Telmatobius espadai being classified as Critically Endangered (CR) on the International Union for Conservation of Nature's Red List, there are, as of February 2010, no known conservation methods in place for this species and no current information on its status. The Rio Apaza population is located on the edges of the Carrasco National Park, and if it persists it will hopefully benefit from this proximity.
