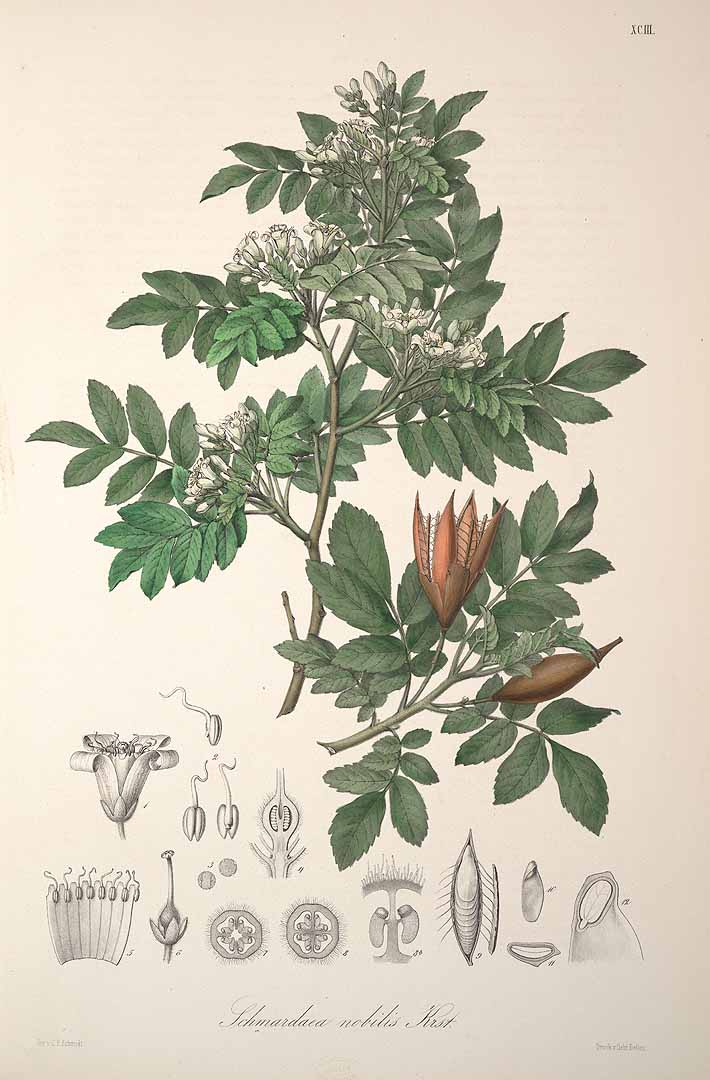
- Branchlets with leaves, flowers and fruits

Conservation status
- Least Concern (IUCN 3.1)

Scientific classification
- Kingdom: Plantae
- Clade: Tracheophytes
- Clade: Angiosperms
- Clade: Eudicots
- Clade: Rosids
- Order: Sapindales
- Family: Meliaceae
- Subfamily: Cedreloideae
- Genus: Schmardaea; H.Karst.
- Species: S. microphylla

Binomial name
- Schmardaea microphylla (Hooker) H.Karst. ex Müll.Berol.

Synonyms
- Elutheria P.Browne; Elutheria microphylla (Hook.) M.Roem.; Guarea microphylla Hook.; Elutheria nobilis (H.Karst.) Triana & Planch.; Schmardaea nobilis H.Karst.; Schmardaea recordiana Dugand

= Schmardaea =

Genus of trees

Schmardaea is a genus of trees in the family Meliaceae. It solely comprises the species Schmardaea microphylla.

== Distribution and habitat ==
Found in cloud forests and dry forests at mid elevations and up to 2700 m in Venezuela, Colombia, Ecuador and Peru.
