= Telmatobius degener =

Conservation status
- Data Deficient (IUCN 3.1)

Scientific classification
- Kingdom: Animalia
- Phylum: Chordata
- Class: Amphibia
- Order: Anura
- Family: Telmatobiidae
- Genus: Telmatobius
- Species: T. degener

Binomial name
- Telmatobius degener Wiens, 1993

Species of frog

Telmatobius degener is a species of frog in the family Telmatobiidae. It is endemic to the La Libertad Region of Peru and only known from its type locality between Otuzco and Huamachuco, at 3,290 m (10,790 ft) asl.

== Habitat ==
The type locality is in the very humid subalpine páramo on the Cordillera Occidental. Scientists saw this frog in thick vegetation near roads, in a flooded field, and in a marsh. They saw it 3290 meters above sea level.

== Relationship to humans ==
People catch many species of frogs in Telmatobius for food. Scientists believe people might catch T. degener for this purpose as well.

== Reproduction ==
Scientists believe this frog reproduces all year because they observed tadpoles at different stages of development at the same time.

== Threats ==
The IUCN classifies this frog as data deficient and scientists from Peru classify it as vulnerable. Possible threats include water pollution from nearby mines and farms. Scientists believe the fungal disease chytridiomycosis may also pose a threat because of the harm it has done to other species in this genus.
