= Telmatobius vellardi =

Conservation status
- Critically endangered, possibly extinct (IUCN 3.1)

Scientific classification
- Kingdom: Animalia
- Phylum: Chordata
- Class: Amphibia
- Order: Anura
- Family: Telmatobiidae
- Genus: Telmatobius
- Species: T. vellardi

Binomial name
- Telmatobius vellardi Munsterman & Leviton, 1959

Species of frog

Telmatobius vellardi (Common name: Vellard's water frog) is a species of frog in the family Telmatobiidae. It is endemic to Ecuador.

== Etymology ==
Scientists named the frog for Jehan Vellard, who worked at the Museo de Historia Natural de la Universidad de San Marcos, called the Museo Javier Prado, in Lima, Peru.

== Description ==
The adult male frog measures about 62.2–72.9 mm (2.45–2.87 in) long in snout-vent length and the adult female frog about 78 mm (3.1 in). Typically, the skin of the dorsum is yellow-brown or olive green in color with black or dark brown spots and marks. The belly is gray, light yellow, light green, or light brown with yellow spots or a gray pattern. The sides of the body are yellow in color with some gray or light brown. The iris of the eye is gray or olive-green in color with black marks. Some individuals have other coloration: A dark brown head and body with many yellow spots, more toward the sides of the body. These frogs have lighter flanks and lips. The tops of the legs are dark brown. The webbed skin is light gray. The irises of their eyes are mottled gray in color. In some individuals, the belly is mottled white and gray.

== Habitat ==
This frog has been found near streams and rivers in montane forests and shrublands. Scientists observed this frog between 2,500 and 3,050 metres (8,200 and 10,010 ft) above sea level.

The frog's known range overlaps with one protected park, Parque Nacional Podocarpus.

== Relationship to humans ==
People catch other frogs in the genus Telmatobius to eat.

== Threats ==
Scientists from the IUCN classify this frog as critically endangered. Diseases, including nematode infections and the fungal disease chytridiomycosis. Habitat loss in favor of ranching, agriculture, human habitation, and logging also poses a threat.
