= Telmatobius thompsoni =

Conservation status
- Data Deficient (IUCN 3.1)

Scientific classification
- Kingdom: Animalia
- Phylum: Chordata
- Class: Amphibia
- Order: Anura
- Family: Telmatobiidae
- Genus: Telmatobius
- Species: T. thompsoni

Binomial name
- Telmatobius thompsoni Wiens, 1993

Species of frog

Telmatobius thompsoni is a species of frog in the family Telmatobiidae. It is endemic to Peru.

== Description ==
The adult male frog can reach 68.9 mm long in snout-vent length and the adult female 77.3 mm. The skin of the dorsum is dull gray or brown in color with small dark marks. The belly is dull yellow in color with dull gray or brown spots.

== Habitat ==
Scientists saw this frog among thick roadside vegetation near a marsh and in one flooded pasture. They saw it 3290 meters above sea level.

== Relationship to humans ==
People catch other frogs in Telmatobius to eat, sell, and make into medicine.

== Threats ==
The IUCN classifies this frog as data deficient. In Peru, it is classified as vulnerable, which affords it legal protection. There are both mining and agricultural activities near the frog's habitat, but their exact effects on the species have yet to be reported. Scientists believe the fungal disease chytridiomycosis might pose a threat to this frog too because it has killed other frogs in Telmatobius.
