= Atelopus peruensis =

Conservation status
- Critically endangered, possibly extinct (IUCN 3.1)

Scientific classification
- Kingdom: Animalia
- Phylum: Chordata
- Class: Amphibia
- Order: Anura
- Family: Bufonidae
- Genus: Atelopus
- Species: A. peruensis

Binomial name
- Atelopus peruensis Gray & Cannatella, 1985

Species of amphibian

Atelopus peruensis is a species of toad in the family Bufonidae. It is endemic to Peru. Its natural habitats are subtropical or tropical high-altitude grassland and rivers.

== Habitat ==
Atelopus peruensis inhabit fast-flowing mountain streams at higher altitudes in the Andes mountains, and its tadpoles use ventral suction discs to cling to rocks in the current of the streams.This observation was first described by Gray and Cannatella in 1985.

== Sources ==
- Schulte, R.; Salas, A.; Angulo, A.; Lötters, S.; Sinsch, U.; Leiva, A.M. (2006). "Atelopus peruensis". IUCN Red List of Threatened Species. 2006 e.T54539A11164132. doi:10.2305/IUCN.UK.2006.RLTS.T54539A11164132.en.
