= Telmatobius niger =

Conservation status
- Critically Endangered (IUCN 3.1)

Scientific classification
- Kingdom: Animalia
- Phylum: Chordata
- Class: Amphibia
- Order: Anura
- Family: Telmatobiidae
- Genus: Telmatobius
- Species: T. niger

Binomial name
- Telmatobius niger Barbour and Noble, 1920

Synonyms
- Telmatobius cinereus Noble, 1921

Species of frog

Telmatobius niger is a species of frog in the family Telmatobiidae. It is endemic to the Andes of Ecuador, with records from both Amazonian and Pacific versants. Last seen in 1994, it is feared that this species may be extinct. The English names black water frog and black Kayla frog have been coined for it.

== Description ==
Adult males measure 46–73 mm (1.8–2.9 in) and adult females 60–77 mm (2.4–3.0 in) in snout–vent length. The head is large. The tympanic annulus may be present, reduced, or absent; the right and left side of a single individual may show different state. The fingers have no webbing whereas the toes are webbed; the degree of webbing varies among individuals. The dorsum has either uniform color or subtle mottling or indistinct spots; the former is more typical. The background color ranges from reddish brown to brownish gray. Mottling spots can be tan, gray, or dark brown. Ventral coloration is similarly variable, but the patterning, when present, is stronger.

== Habitat and conservation ==
Telmatobius niger has been recorded in the vicinity of streams and rivers in cloud forests, moist scrubland, high-altitude páramo grassland, evergreen montane forests, and dry montane scrubland at elevations of 2,469–4,000 m (8,100–13,123 ft) above sea level. During daytime, adults usually occur beneath rocks and in weedy vegetation in and at the edge of streams. Breeding takes place in streams.

This species was formerly reasonably common and is historically known from several locations. However, it has declined dramatically and might now be extinct. The last record is from Lagunas de Atillo (Chimborazo Province) in December 1994. Later surveys to historic sites have not resulted in any new records. The possible reasons for the decline include disease and parasites (e.g., chytridiomycosis, nematodes), abnormal climatic conditions, and habitat destruction and degradation caused by agricultural development and human settlement. There is also some collection for human consumption.

Parts of the historic range fall within national parks, notably Parque Nacional Sangay, Área de Conservación Ecológica Siete Iglesias, and El Cajas National Park.

The IUCN recommends that a captive breeding program be established for this species.
