= Linda Trueb =

American herpetologist (born 1942)

Linda Trueb is an American professor of herpetology and systematics biology at the University of Kansas and a senior curator emerita at the university's Biodiversity Institute. She also acts as the associate director for the Institute's Administration and Research department.

== Education ==
Trueb completed a bachelor's of science in zoology at the University of Kansas in 1962 and a Ph.D. at the same university in 1968.

== Career ==
After establishing her own lab at the University of Kansas post-graduation, Trueb focused on amphibians in the neotropics, taking many fieldwork trips there with her husband to study both amphibians and reptiles. In 1986, they published the textbook Biology of Amphibians that was to act as a key reference work on the subject. It was noted by Hans-Dieter Sues in a 2009 review of a separate work that the text "remains the best survey of the diversity and biology of extant amphibians." She served as president of the American Society of Ichthyologists and Herpetologists in 1992 and has had editorial positions for several academic journals, including the Journal of Morphology.

Her research has been published on the morphology of amphibians, beginning with cranial studies in the 1970s to phylogenetic investigations between living and fossil frog species in the 1980s, along with additional relational genetics of groups in the following decade. While continuing with this osteology research, Trueb retired from her lab position in 1997, becoming "Curator-In-Charge" for the University of Kansas Natural History Museum until 2008. She then took up administration work for the university's Biodiversity Institute.

== Personal life ==
Trueb married fellow herpetologist William E. Duellman in April 1965 and they had a daughter, Dana, together in 1970. Duellman died in February 2022.

After her continuous academic work in the field, Trueb retired from her position at the KU Department of Ecology and Systematics and Biodiversity Institute. She now serves as a Senior Curator Emerita, focusing on her role as the Associate Director for Administration and Research at the KU Biodiversity Institute.

== Bibliography ==
- — (1968). Cranial Osteology of the Hylid Frog, Smilisca Baudini. DigiCat. p. 22.
- —; Duellman, William E. (1971). A Synopsis of Neotropical Hylid Frogs, Genus Osteocephalus. Good Press. p. 52.
- — (1971). Systematic Relationships of Neotropical Horned Frogs, Genus Hemiphractus (Anura, Hylidae). University of Kansas Natural History Museum. p. 60. ISBN 9780666648150.
- —; Tyler, Michael J. (1974). Systematics and Evolution of the Greater Antillean Hylid Frogs. University of Kansas Natural History Museum. p. 60. ISBN 9780267640911.
- —; Duellman, William E. (1986). Biology of Amphibians. Johns Hopkins University Press. p. 670. ISBN 9780801847806.
- —; Schultze, Hans-Peter, eds. (1991). Origins of the Higher Groups of Tetrapods: Controversy and Consensus. Comstock Pub. Associates. p. 724. ISBN 9780801424977.
- Rodriguez, Lily O. (1994). —; Duellman, William E. (eds.). Guide to the Frogs of the Iquitos Region, Amazonian Peru. University of Kansas Natural History Museum. p. 80. ISBN 9780893380472.
- —; Duellman, William E. (2015). Marsupial Frogs: Gastrotheca and Allied Genera. Johns Hopkins University Press. p. 407. ISBN 9781421416755.
