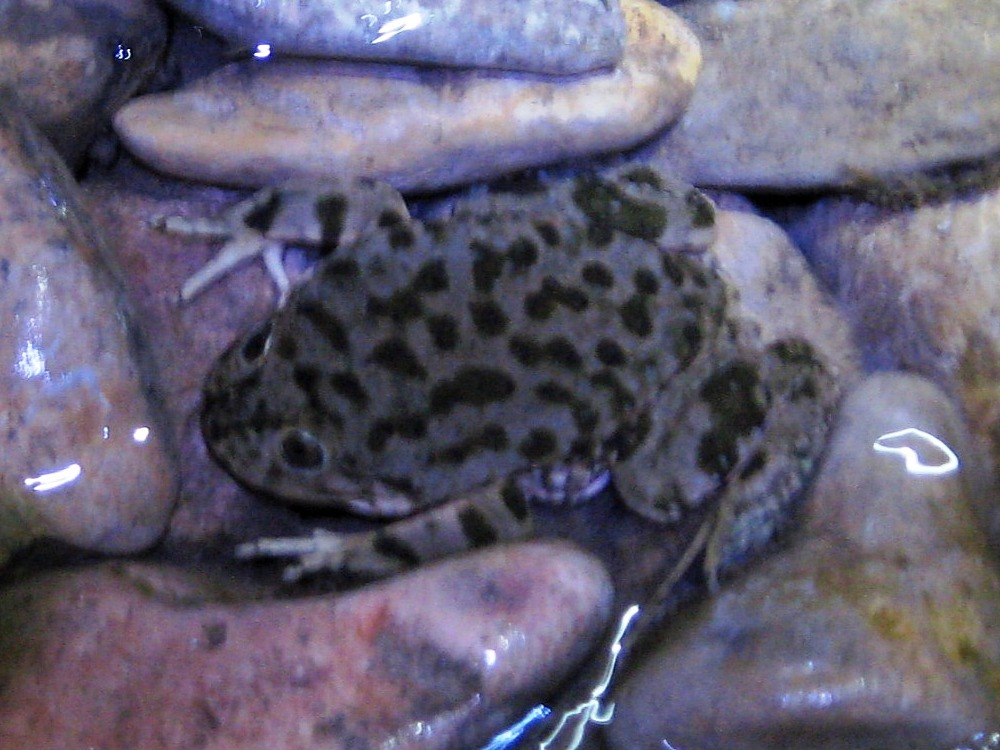
- At Isla del Sol, Lake Titicaca, Bolivia

Conservation status
- Endangered (IUCN 3.1)

Scientific classification
- Kingdom: Animalia
- Phylum: Chordata
- Class: Amphibia
- Order: Anura
- Family: Telmatobiidae
- Genus: Telmatobius
- Species: T. marmoratus

Binomial name
- Telmatobius marmoratus (Duméril & Bibron, 1841)

= Telmatobius marmoratus =

Species of amphibian

Telmatobius marmoratus, the marbled water frog, is a vulnerable species of frog in the family Telmatobiidae. The most widespread species in the genus, it is found in the Andean highlands of Bolivia, northern Chile and southern Peru. It may also occur in northwestern Argentina, but the taxonomic position of this population is unclear.

== Description ==
Among 16 adult T. marmoratus from Isla del Sol, the largest had a snout-vent length of 7.5 cm (3.0 in). It is very closely related to the larger and less widespread T. gigas, and they might be conspecific. Another close relative (but clearly a separate species) is the Titicaca water frog (T. culeus) and both species are found in Lake Titicaca.

== Etymology ==
Scientists named the frog marmoratus from the Greek word marmor meaning to shine or glisten like marble.

== Habitat ==
This semiaquatic frog is found in and near streams, rivers, waterfalls, lakes and ponds. The frog has been observed between 1800 and 5244 meters above sea level.

Scientists have seen this frog in some protected parks: Parque Nacional Lauca, Parque Nacional Cotapata, Parque Nacional Sajama, and Área Natural de Manejo Integrado Apolobamba and they suspect it in Reserva Nacional del Titicaca. The frog has also been observed at archaeological sites: in Sacsayhuaman and Tambomachay.

== Reproduction ==
This frog has young during both the wet and dry seasons. It reproduces in bogs.

== Threats ==
The IUCN classifies this frog as endangered, but it is not threatened in all parts of its range. In Chile, the frog is not threatened. In Peru and Bolivia, people capture this frog for consumption as food, juice, or medicine. The frog is also in danger from water diversion, eutrophication, climate change, and pollution from farms and homes. Scientists have the fungus Batrachochytrium dendrobatidis on the frog, and they believe the fungal disease chytridiomycosis threatens this frog.

Scientists have observed upward migration in this species as Andean glaciers retreat. However, the migrating frogs bring the chytrid fungus with them.
