= Noblella losamigos =

Scientific classification
- Kingdom: Animalia
- Phylum: Chordata
- Class: Amphibia
- Order: Anura
- Clade: Brachycephaloidea
- Family: Craugastoridae
- Genus: Noblella
- Species: N. losamigos

Binomial name
- Noblella losamigos Santa Cruz, von May, Catenazzi, Whitcher, López Tejeda, and Rabosky, 2019

Species of amphibian

Noblella losamigos is a species of frog in the family Craugastoridae. It is ochre or copper-brown, with white markings on the abdomen. The species is endemic to Peru, and was described in 2019.

== Taxonomy ==
Noblella losamigos was described in 2019, by Roy Santa-Cruz, Rudolf von May, Alessandro Catenazzi, Courtney Whitcher, Evaristo López Tejeda, and Daniel L. Rabosky. It was previously confused with Noblella myrmecoides, and is closely related to Noblella pygmaea.

The holotype is an adult female.

== Distribution ==
Noblella losamigos is endemic to Peru, and is found in Manu and Tambopata. The species is found in leaf litter in lowland and montane rainforests. It is found at elevations of 240–1,490 metres (790–4,890 ft).

Noblella losamigos is sympatric with Adenomera andreae, Amazophrynella javierbustamantei, Ameerega hahneli, Ameerega simulans, Chiasmocleis royi, Engystomops freibergi, Hamptophryne boliviana, Leptodactylus didymus, Oreobates granulosus, Pristimantis carvalhoi, Pristimantis danae, Pristimantis reichlei, Pristimantis toftae, Pristimantis salaputium, Rhinella leptoscelis, and Rhinella margaritifera.

== Description ==
Females measure around 12.18 millimetres (0.480 in) in snout-vent length. and males measure around 10.08 millimetres (0.397 in) in snout-vent length. Body size is thought to be positively correlated with elevation.

The skin on the back is smooth or finely shagreened. The skin on the underside is smooth. The back is ochre-gold or copper-brown, sometimes with dark brown marks and stripes. The abdomen is black, or transparent and grey. Irregular white markings are present on the abdomen, thighs, toes, and neck. The species lacks nuptial pads.

The face is dark brown, with cream spots. The tympanic membrane is evident, and a columella is present. The snout is short and rounded or subtruncate. The nostrils do not protrude. The upper eyelid has minute tubercles. The vomer lacks a dentigerous process.

The species undergoes direct development.

== Conservation ==
Noblella losamigos is found in several protected areas, including Manu National Park, Amarakaeri Communal Reserve, and Tambopata National Reserve. It is threatened by logging and mining.

== Etymology ==
The specific epithet losamigos refers to the type locality, Los Amigos Biological Station.
