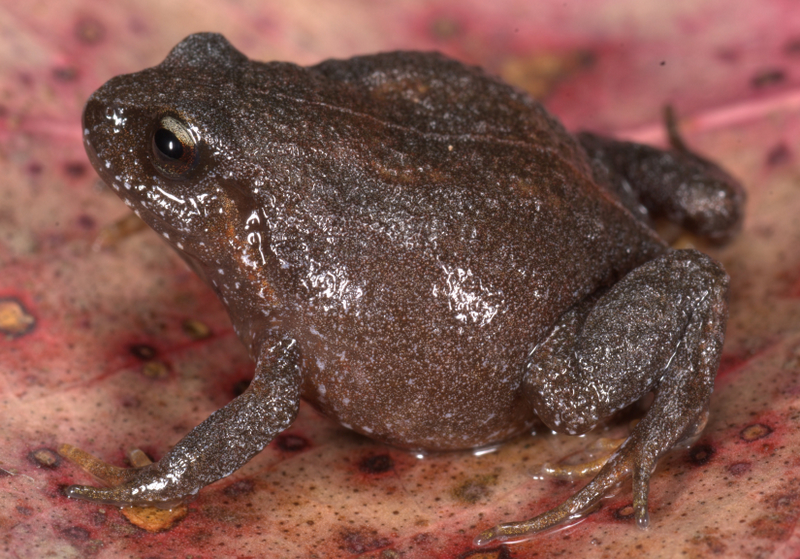

Conservation status
- Least Concern (IUCN 3.1)

Scientific classification
- Kingdom: Animalia
- Phylum: Chordata
- Class: Amphibia
- Order: Anura
- Clade: Brachycephaloidea
- Family: Craugastoridae
- Genus: Qosqophryne
- Species: Q. gymnotis

Binomial name
- Qosqophryne gymnotis (Catenazzi, Mamani, Lehr, and von May, 2020)

Synonyms
- Bryophryne gymnotis; Lehr and Catenazzi, 2009

= Qosqophryne gymnotis =

Species of frog

Qosqophryne gymnotis is a species of frog in the family Strabomantidae. It is known from only two sites near Abra Malaga, Cusco, Peru, at between 3,272 and 3,530 meters above sea level. Its natural habitat is high altitude montane cloud forests, and lays its eggs in wet mosses. It was discovered in 2009 along with B. hanssaueri and B. zonalis, and was originally classified as a member of Bryophryne. In 2020, it was moved along with B. flammiventris and B. mancoinca to the newly created genus Qosqophryne based on a phylogenetic analysis.

== Etymology ==
The species name gynmnotis is a combination of the Greek adjective gymnos, meaning "bare, naked" and the Greek noun otos, meaning "ear". This is because when it was discovered, one of its distinguishing characteristics was that it was the only member of the Bryophryne genus to have a tympanum.

== Morphology ==
The species has rough (shagreen) skin on its back and smooth skin on its belly. It has an tympanic membrane (eardrum) and a tympanic annulus, as well as a vocal sac with vocal slits. The back can be reddish brown, grayish brown, purplish brown, or dark gray; the belly can be dark brown, tan, or reddish brown with pale grey flecks. The frogs has also have narrow, tan mid-dorsal strips running down the middle of their backs. Its advertisement call is a single, short note repeated at regular intervals.
