= Qosqophryne mancoinca =

Scientific classification
- Kingdom: Animalia
- Phylum: Chordata
- Class: Amphibia
- Order: Anura
- Clade: Brachycephaloidea
- Family: Craugastoridae
- Genus: Qosqophryne
- Species: Q. mancoinca

Binomial name
- Qosqophryne mancoinca (Catenazzi, Mamani, Lehr, and von May, 2020)

Synonyms
- Bryophryne mancoinca Mamani L, Catenazzi A, Ttito A, Chaparro JC 2017

Species of frog

Qosqophryne mancoinca is a species of frog in the family Strabomantidae. It is only found in Santa Teresa, Cusco, Peru, between 3,519 and 3,707 meters above sea level. Its natural habitat is high altitude montane grasslands and cloud forests. It was originally classified as a member of Bryophryne, but was later moved to the newly created genus Qosqophryne.
