= Noblella glauca =

Scientific classification
- Kingdom: Animalia
- Phylum: Chordata
- Class: Amphibia
- Order: Anura
- Clade: Brachycephaloidea
- Family: Craugastoridae
- Genus: Noblella
- Species: N. glauca

Binomial name
- Noblella glauca (Catenazzi and Ttito, 2018)

Synonyms
- Psychrophrynella glauca Catenazzi and Ttito, 2018

Species of amphibian

Noblella glauca is a species of frog in the family Craugastoridae. It is endemic to the Distrito Ollachea, Peru, and is found on the Amazonian slopes of the Andes at an elevation of 2225 meters above sea level. The type location, near Thiuni in Puno, Peru, yielded an additional unique species, Noblella thiuni, one year after N. glauca was discovered.

N. glauca was originally described from three individuals (2 females, 1 males). Females appear to be larger than males, with a mean snout-to-vent length of 19.0 mm compared to the lone male's SVL of 11.3 mm.
