= Microkayla adenopleura =

Conservation status
- Endangered (IUCN 3.1)

Scientific classification
- Kingdom: Animalia
- Phylum: Chordata
- Class: Amphibia
- Order: Anura
- Clade: Brachycephaloidea
- Family: Craugastoridae
- Genus: Microkayla
- Species: M. adenopleura

Binomial name
- Microkayla adenopleura (Aguayo-Vedia and Harvey, 2001)

Synonyms
- Phrynopus adenopleurus Aguayo-Vedia and Harvey, 2001; Psychrophrynella adenopleura (Aguayo-Vedia and Harvey, 2001)

Species of frog

Microkayla adenopleura is a species of frog in the family Strabomantidae. It is endemic to Bolivia and only known from near its type locality in the Carrasco National Park, Cochabamba Department, at elevations of 3,250–3,400 m (10,660–11,150 ft) asl. It is a common species living in low, humid montane forest typical to the transition between Yungas forest and páramo. Outside the national park, if present, it would be threatened by habitat loss.
