= Noblella duellmani =

Conservation status
- Data Deficient (IUCN 3.1)

Scientific classification
- Kingdom: Animalia
- Phylum: Chordata
- Class: Amphibia
- Order: Anura
- Clade: Brachycephaloidea
- Family: Craugastoridae
- Genus: Noblella
- Species: N. duellmani

Binomial name
- Noblella duellmani (Lehr, Aguilar, and Lundberg, 2004)

Synonyms
- Phyllonastes duellmani Lehr, Aguilar, and Lundberg, 2004

Species of frog

Noblella duellmani is a species of frog in the family Strabomantidae. It is endemic to Peru and only known from its type locality, Cillapata, at 2,900 m (9,500 ft) asl in the Paucartambo District, Pasco Region.

Noblella duellmani is only known from the holotype, which was collected from a seldom used or abandoned pasture, surrounded by secondary and primary forest. Later searches at the type locality and neighbouring areas have not resulted in new findings. Threats to this species that is either rare or difficult to find are unknown.
