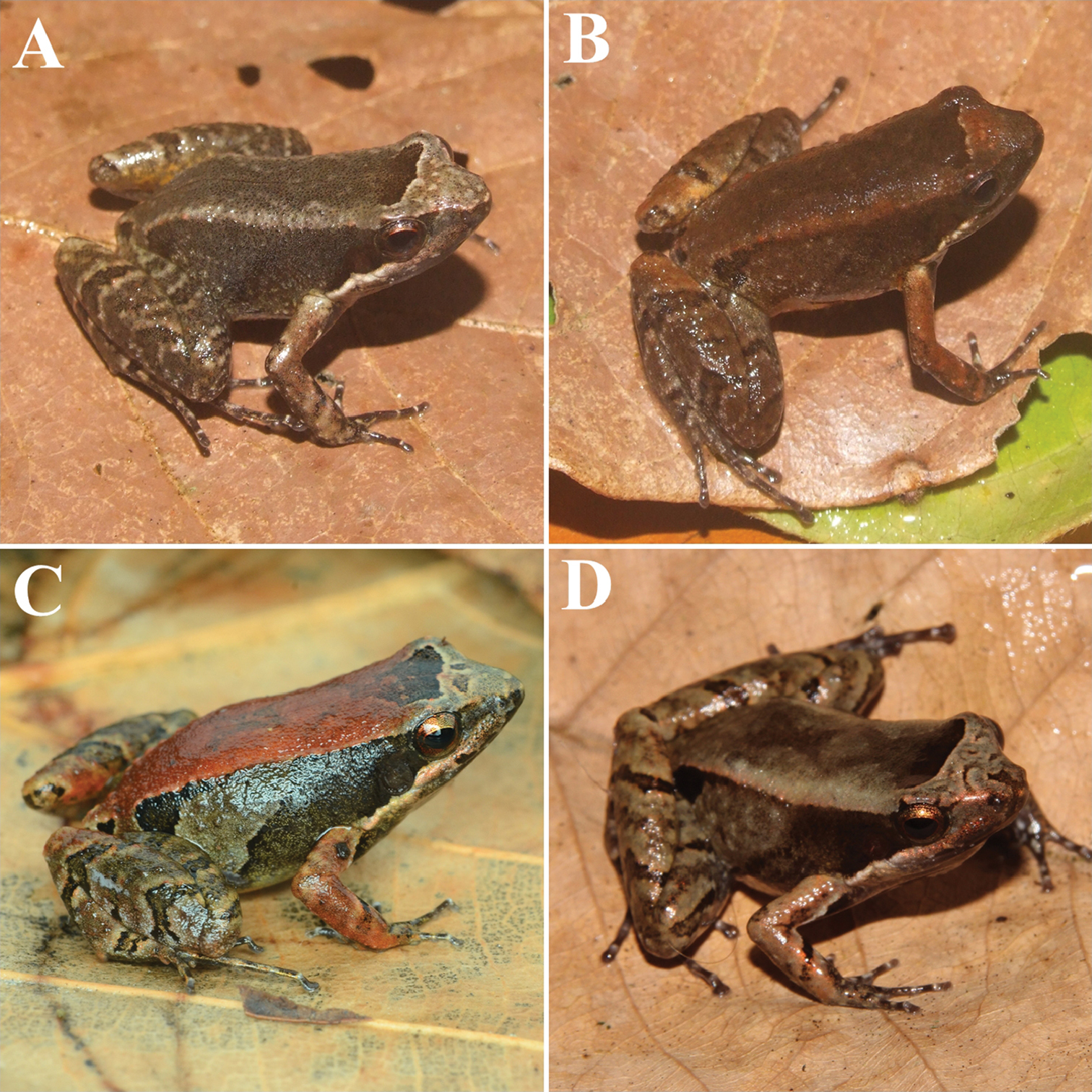
- Pattern and color variation in Bahius bilineatus

Conservation status
- Least Concern (IUCN 3.1)

Scientific classification
- Kingdom: Animalia
- Phylum: Chordata
- Class: Amphibia
- Order: Anura
- Clade: Brachycephaloidea
- Family: Craugastoridae
- Subfamily: Holoadeninae
- Genus: Bahius; Dubois, Ohler, and Pyron, 2021
- Species: B. bilineatus

Binomial name
- Bahius bilineatus (Bokermann, 1975)
- Distribution map of Bahius bilineatus

Synonyms
- (Genus): Heyerus Motta, Taucce, Haddad, and Canedo, 2021; (Species): Eleutherodactylus bilineatus Bokermann, 1975 "1974"; "Eleutherodactylus" bilineatus (Bokermann, 1975); Ischnocnema bilineata (Bokermann, 1975); Heyerus bilineatus (Bokermann, 1975)

= Bahius =

Species of frog

Bahius is a genus of frog in the family Strabomantidae. It contains a single species, Bahius bilineatus, commonly called the two-lined robber frog.

B. bilineatus was long classified in the genus Eleutherodactylus in the family Eleutherodactylidae, until later studies found it to form a clade with Noblella and Barycholos within subfamily Holoadeninae. Due to this, it was reclassified to the monotypic genus Bahius.

It is endemic to the Bahia state in eastern Brazil. Its natural habitat is lowland moist forest, but it also occurs in cocoa plantations. With trees around, it accepts habitat alteration. It has been found in leaf litter and in bromeliads. It can be threatened by habitat loss.
