= Qosqophryne =

Scientific classification
- Kingdom: Animalia
- Phylum: Chordata
- Class: Amphibia
- Order: Anura
- Clade: Brachycephaloidea
- Family: Craugastoridae
- Subfamily: Holoadeninae
- Genus: Qosqophryne; Catenazzi, Mamani, Lehr, and von May, 2020

Diversity
- 3 species (see text)

Genus of amphibians

Qosqophryne is a genus of brachycephaloid frogs. These frogs are endemic to south-eastern Peru in the Cusco Region at 3270 to 3800 meters above sea level. A phylogenetic analysis found Qosqophryne as sister to the genus Microkayla and that this clade was more closely related to Noblella and Psychrophrynella than to other species in Bryophryne.

== Taxonomy ==
The genus Qosqophryne was erected in 2020 to accommodate three species that were in Bryophryne at that time.

== Species ==
The following species are recognised in the genus Qosqophryne:

- Qosqophryne flammiventris Lehr and Catenazzi, 2010
- Qosqophryne gymnotis Lehr E, Catenazzi A 2009
- Qosqophryne mancoinca Mamani L, Catenazzi A, Ttito A, Chaparro JC 2017
