= Qosqophryne flammiventris =

Conservation status
- Data Deficient (IUCN 3.1)

Scientific classification
- Kingdom: Animalia
- Phylum: Chordata
- Class: Amphibia
- Order: Anura
- Clade: Brachycephaloidea
- Family: Craugastoridae
- Genus: Qosqophryne
- Species: Q. flammiventris

Binomial name
- Qosqophryne flammiventris (Catenazzi, Mamani, Lehr, and von May, 2020)

Synonyms
- Bryophryne flammiventris; Lehr and Catenazzi, 2010

Species of frog

Qosqophryne flammiventris is a species of frog in the family Strabomantidae. It is only found in Vilcabamba, Cusco, Peru, at 3,000 meters above sea level. Its natural habitat is high altitude montane grasslands, where it lives in thick layers of moss. It was originally classified as a member of Bryophryne, but was later moved to the newly created genus Qosqophryne.
