= Phyllonastes lynchi =

Conservation status
- Endangered (IUCN 3.1)

Scientific classification
- Kingdom: Animalia
- Phylum: Chordata
- Class: Amphibia
- Order: Anura
- Family: Strabomantidae
- Genus: Phyllonastes
- Species: P. lynchi

Binomial name
- Phyllonastes lynchi Duellman, 1991

Synonyms
- Noblella lynchi De la Riva, Chaparro Auza, and Padial, 2008

Species of frog

Phyllonastes lynchi, commonly called Lynch's leaf frog, is a species of frog in the family Craugastoridae. It is endemic to Peru and only known from its type locality on the eastern slope of Abra Chanchillo, near Balsas, Amazonas Region.

Phyllonastes lynchi is known from disturbed cloud forest. It is a rare species: a search effort of 30 person days uncovered only four individuals.
