= Holoaden bradei =

Conservation status
- Critically endangered, possibly extinct (IUCN 3.1)

Scientific classification
- Kingdom: Animalia
- Phylum: Chordata
- Class: Amphibia
- Order: Anura
- Clade: Brachycephaloidea
- Family: Craugastoridae
- Genus: Holoaden
- Species: H. bradei

Binomial name
- Holoaden bradei Lutz, 1958

Species of amphibian

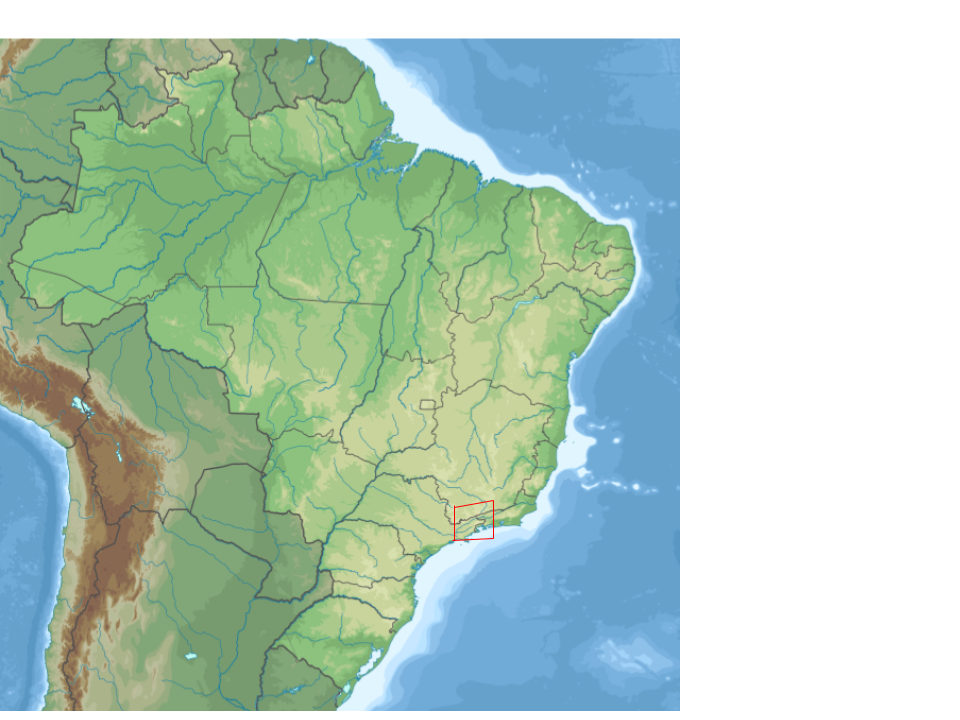
Area that Itatiaia Highland frogs live in, Itatiaia Mountains, including parts of Sao Paulo, Rio de Janeiro, and Minas Gerais.

Holoaden bradei, or the Itatiaia highland frog, is a species of frog in the family Strabomantidae. It is endemic to the Itatiaia Mountains of south-eastern Brazil. It is restricted to an area of 10 km^{2} at an elevation of 2,400 to 2,600, the type locality being at 22°21′S, 44°44′W at a location known as Alto Itatiaia. H. bradei is found among stones, mulch, and terrestrial bromeliads, in which it breeds through direct development. H. bradei may already be extinct in the wild because it has not been recorded in the wild for several decades.

== Description ==
It is a small frog that has an olive-brown skin color with irregular dark patches around its body. The belly of the frog is a cream color, and the tips of the frog's hands are a bright yellow. It has a large, wide head with an oval body and a rounded snout. It has short limbs, and has large eyes that face forward. The Highland frog's eyes have diamond-shaped pupils. The female frogs are slightly larger than the male frogs. The length of their snouts have been recorded up to 3.7 centimeters.

== Distribution and habitat ==
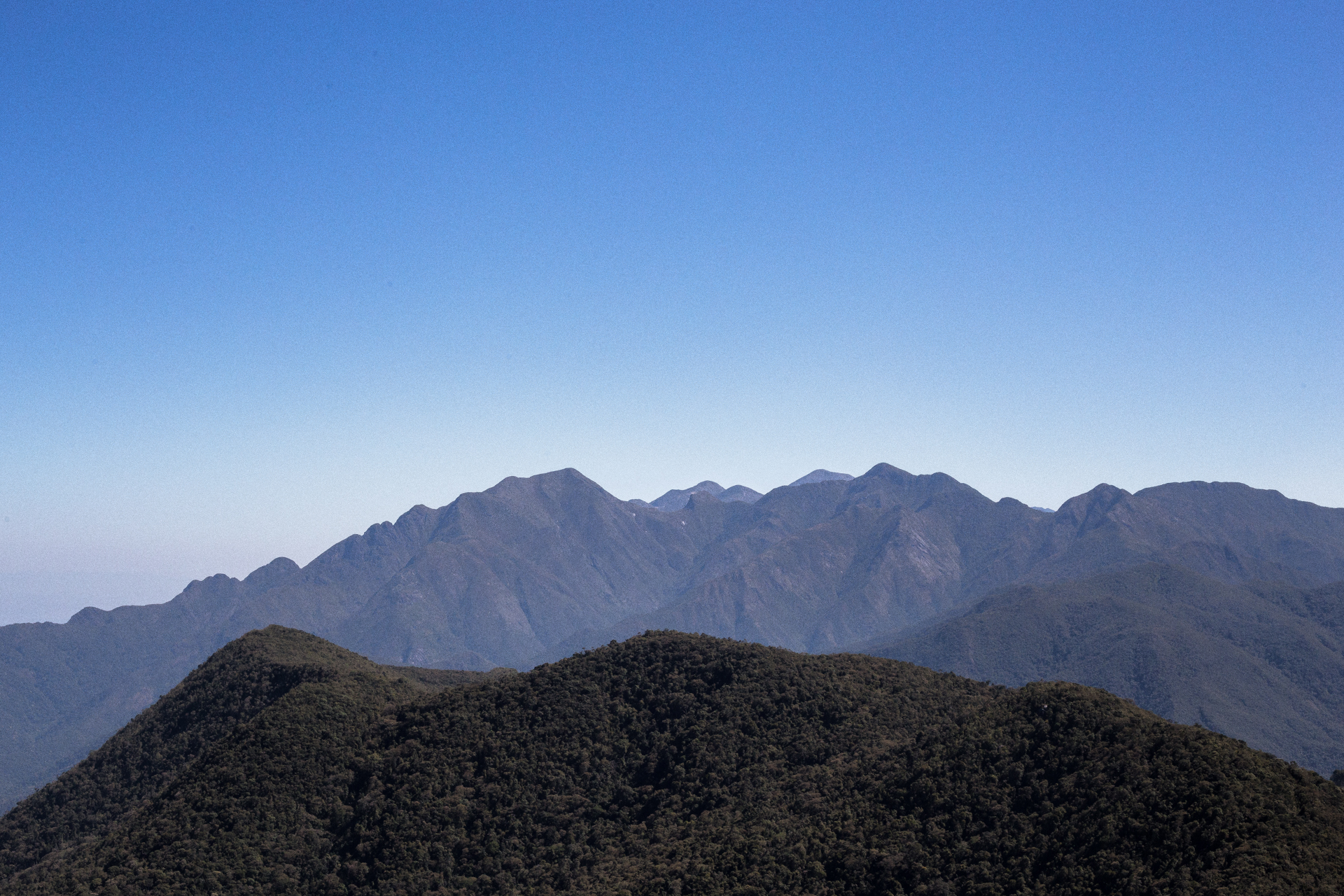
Photo of mountains Holoaden bradei are known to live in

Itatiaia highland frogs are a terrestrial species. They are often found under mulch, leaves, and stones in open grasslands or sparse forests. They have also been known to live in burrows and other shaded places. They are also known to reside in shrublands, particularly in the moist areas. As the name suggests, they are found in the highlands of the Itatiaia Mountains in Brazil, specifically in the states of Rio de Janeiro, Sâo Paulo, and Minas Gerais. They are found at elevations of around 2,100 to 2,600 meters above sea level. They were frequently found there up until the 1970s, but have not been seen since 1976. Because of this, they are believed to most likely be extinct.

== Distress calls ==
Calls of any kind, specifically advertisement calls, can be extremely influential to studies related to classification of species. A recording retrieved from 1964 by Werner C. Bokermann displays the last form of evidence of this species. The recording contains 11 distress calls of the species. These calls have been classified as distress calls due to the number of harmonic bands within the interval on the call and because the given frog completed the call while in the hands of the handler. Among the eleven calls, there was very little consistency, excluding the significant decrease in modulation toward the end of the call. Scientists believe that the descent in modulation results from the closing of the frog's mouth at the conclusion of the call. Six of the calls indicated a rapid increase in modulation, with a rapid decrease in modulation immediately after. Little to no modulation followed by a rapid decline in modulation was seen in three of the calls. In two of the calls, a rapid increase in modulation occurred at the beginning of the call, which ended with no modulation.

== Threats ==
Highland frogs are classified as critically endangered by the IUCN Red List. Itatiaia Highland frogs are threatened by a variety of factors, which may have led to their possible extinction. Highland frogs have been reported to be affected by extreme frosts. Potential factors that decimated this species include deforestation, expansion of agriculture leading to habitat loss and/or fragmentation, UV radiation, urbanization and/or development of infrastructure, mining, natural disasters such as wildfires. The main, overarching threat is habitat loss. In the late 1980s, there were increased reports about drops in amphibian populations, which can be tied to the rise in pervasiveness of chytrid fungi. Deforestation in particular is exacerbated by the cattle ranching/the beef industry. About 3/4 of clearing of Amazonian forests comes from cattle ranches. In addition, forest degradation contributes to a general decrease in biodiversity and global warming, which can significantly impact wildlife, including Itatiaia Highland Frogs. In order to lessen these impacts, the Brazilian government must implement stricter policies and fines to deter deforestation efforts. Other possibilities that are not often considered in Brazil include pesticides, invasive species, the trade of wild species, disease, pollution, and climate change. In addition, amphibians have been showed to be more vulnerable to any potential threats than mammals and birds. The extreme change in temperature has led to the rapidly decreasing population. Holoaden bradei are found on the Brazilian, Global, Rio De Janeiro, and Minas Gerais red lists. Brazil is home to the greatest number of amphibian species, not to mention the home of the greatest number of species across the board. As a nation, Brazil has adopted conservation efforts such as the use of red lists and designating areas for conservation in ecologically divergent areas. Since the 1980s, states have been able to take conservation initiatives in to their own hands, rather than being monopolized by the federal government. In situ conservation methods are reported to be occurring, specifically land and water protection. It is unknown whether or not these efforts are directly aiding Holoaden bradei, as they have not been recorded in the wild in decades.The lack of information surrounding Brazilian organisms can be related to lack of priority toward watching species, the enormous, overwhelming biodiversity of the area, and little expertise on herpetology and ecology.

== Ecology ==
Although very little information about the reproduction of highland frogs is available, it is believed that they breed by direct development. They lay their eggs under mulch and leaves, and a parent will guard the eggs. If threatened, the parent highland frog will raise itself on its forelimbs, and hiss at the potential predator to try to make it go away. The offspring, however, bypasses the larval stage and becomes a miniature adult when it hatches from its egg.
