= Microkayla iatamasi =

Conservation status
- Least Concern (IUCN 3.1)

Scientific classification
- Kingdom: Animalia
- Phylum: Chordata
- Class: Amphibia
- Order: Anura
- Clade: Brachycephaloidea
- Family: Craugastoridae
- Genus: Microkayla
- Species: M. iatamasi

Binomial name
- Microkayla iatamasi (Aguayo-Vedia & Harvey, 2001)

Synonyms
- Phrynopus iatamasi Aguayo-Vedia & Harvey, 2001; Psychrophrynella iatamasi (Aguayo-Vedia & Harvey, 2001)

Species of frog

Microkayla iatamasi is a species of frog in the family Strabomantidae.

== Habitat ==
It is endemic to Bolivia and only known from near its type locality at the northern limit of the Carrasco National Park, Cochabamba Department, at elevations of 2,600–4,192 m (8,530–13,753 ft) asl. Its natural habitats are cloud forest, elfin forest, and humid páramo. It is considered to be an abundant species within its small distribution area. The latter makes it susceptible to stochastic events. In addition, climate change is a potential threat.
