= Noblella carrascoicola =

Conservation status
- Least Concern (IUCN 3.1)

Scientific classification
- Kingdom: Animalia
- Phylum: Chordata
- Class: Amphibia
- Order: Anura
- Clade: Brachycephaloidea
- Family: Craugastoridae
- Genus: Noblella
- Species: N. carrascoicola

Binomial name
- Noblella carrascoicola (De la Riva and Köhler, 1998)

Synonyms
- Phyllonastes carrascoicola De la Riva and Köhler, 1998

Species of frog

Noblella carrascoicola is a species of frog in the family Strabomantidae. It is endemic to the north-eastern Andean slopes of Bolivia, at least between the Cochabamba and La Paz Departments. Its natural habitats are very humid cloud forest and Yungas forest. At day, they can be found in leaf-litter on the forest floor, or occasionally, epiphytic bromeliads. There are no known threats to this abundant species.
