= Noblella bagrecito =

Bagrecito Andes frog

Conservation status
- Critically Endangered (IUCN 3.1)

Scientific classification
- Kingdom: Animalia
- Phylum: Chordata
- Class: Amphibia
- Order: Anura
- Family: Strabomantidae
- Genus: Noblella
- Species: N. bagrecito

Binomial name
- Noblella bagrecito (Lynch, 1986)

Synonyms
- Phrynopus bagrecito Lynch, 1986; Psychrophrynella bagrecito Hedges, Duellman, and Heinicke, 2008

Species of amphibian

Noblella bagrecito, commonly called the Bagrecito Andes frog, is a species of frog in the family Craugastoridae. It is endemic to the Cusco Region, Peru, and found on the Amazonian slopes of the Andes at elevations of 1,830–2,740 m (6,000–8,990 ft) asl. The specific name bagrecito is Spanish meaning a small catfish, and a nickname for David C. Cannatella, a colleague of John D. Lynch, the scientist who described the species from specimens collected from near Marcapata.

== Description ==
Noblella bagrecito are small frogs: adult males measure 14–16 mm (0.55–0.63 in) and females 14–19 mm (0.55–0.75 in) in snout–vent length. Skin on dorsum is shagreened, becoming more coarse on the lower back. Dorsum is striped with shades of brown. Venter has areolate skin and is white to cream with some brown mottling. Males have distended vocal sacs.

== Habitat and conservation ==
Species' natural habitat is montane cloud forest. It is threatened by habitat loss caused by small-scale agriculture and firewood collection.
