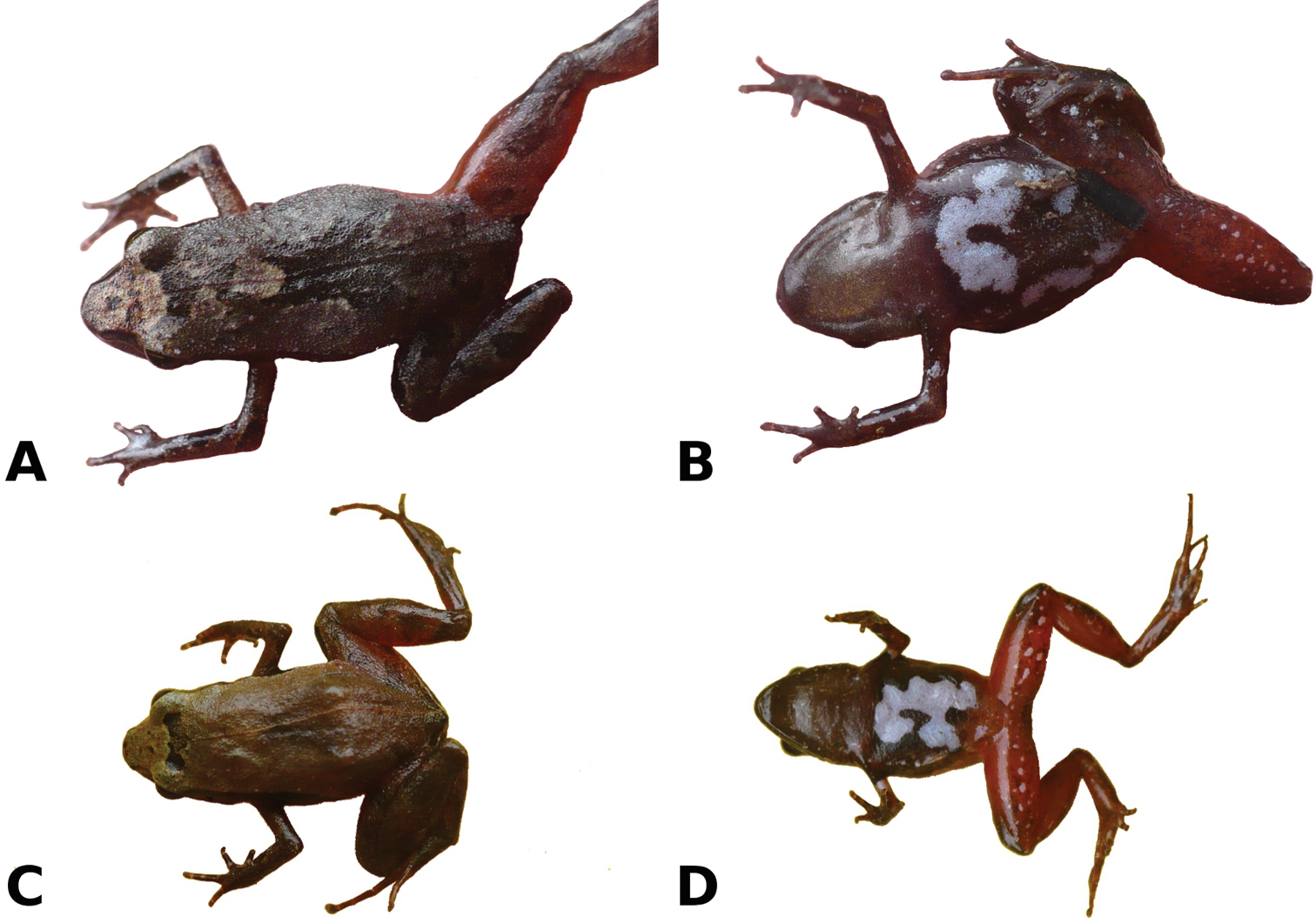
- Dorsal (left) and ventral (right) views of living specimens

Conservation status
- Critically Endangered (IUCN 3.1)

Scientific classification
- Kingdom: Animalia
- Phylum: Chordata
- Class: Amphibia
- Order: Anura
- Clade: Brachycephaloidea
- Family: Craugastoridae
- Genus: Noblella
- Species: N. madreselva

Binomial name
- Noblella madreselva Catenazzi, Uscapi and von May, 2015
- Noblella madreselva (Peru)
- Noblella madreselva is only known from Madre Selva, in Cusco, Peru

= Noblella madreselva =

Species of frog

Noblella madreselva is a species of frog in the family Strabomantidae. The species is only known from its type locality, Madre Selva in the La Convención Province, Cusco, Peru.

== Etymology ==
The specific name, madreselva, translates to "mother jungle" in Spanish. It honors the efforts of local conservation initiatives, such as the local ecotourism lodge Madre Selva.

== Description ==
The holotype, an adult male, measures 16 mm (0.6 in) in snout–vent length, while the paratype, an adult female, measures 18 mm (0.7 in). The snout is short and rounded, bluntly so in lateral view. The tympanic annulus is barely visible. The fingers and toes have narrow lateral fringes. The fingers have rounded tips while the toe tips are weakly acuminate. The dorsal coloration is tan to dull brown, with or without dark brown markings. Some specimens have diffuse brown suprainguinal stripes. The venter (the chest and belly) has a prominent white mark on a black background. The ventral surfaces of the limbs are red with small white spots.

== Habitat and conservation ==
Noblella madreselva inhabits humid montane forests at elevations of 2,330–2,370 m (7,640–7,780 ft) above sea level. It is largely terrestrial and has been spotted under rocks, logs, and in the leaf litter during the day. Like its closest relatives, it is likely to direct development (i.e., there is no free-living larval stage).

Noblella madreselva is threatened by habitat loss and modification associated with agricultural activities in the region. It is not known to occur in any protected areas. However, the region of its type locality is partially protected by various reserves.
