= Microkayla pinguis =

Conservation status
- Vulnerable (IUCN 3.1)

Scientific classification
- Kingdom: Animalia
- Phylum: Chordata
- Class: Amphibia
- Order: Anura
- Clade: Brachycephaloidea
- Family: Craugastoridae
- Genus: Microkayla
- Species: M. pinguis

Binomial name
- Microkayla pinguis (Harvey and Ergueta-Sandoval, 1998)

Synonyms
- Phrynopus pinguis Harvey and Ergueta-Sandoval, 1998; Psychrophrynella pinguis (Harvey and Ergueta-Sandoval, 1998)

Species of frog

Microkayla pinguis is a species of frog in the family Strabomantidae. It is endemic to Bolivia and only known from its type locality in Inquisivi Province, La Paz Department. It is known from an area consisting of a mixture of elfin forest and pastures, where it was found under stones in a humid stream bed. Smallholder agriculture and climate change are potential threats to this species.
