= Holoaden luederwaldti =

Conservation status
- Near Threatened (IUCN 3.1)

Scientific classification
- Kingdom: Animalia
- Phylum: Chordata
- Class: Amphibia
- Order: Anura
- Clade: Brachycephaloidea
- Family: Craugastoridae
- Genus: Holoaden
- Species: H. luederwaldti

Binomial name
- Holoaden luederwaldti Miranda-Ribeiro, 1920

Species of frog

Holoaden luederwaldti is a species of frog in the family Strabomantidae. It is endemic to Brazil. Its natural habitats are subtropical or tropical high-altitude shrubland, subtropical or tropical high-altitude grassland, and rocky areas. It is threatened by habitat loss.
