= Microkayla kempffi =

Conservation status
- Endangered (IUCN 3.1)

Scientific classification
- Kingdom: Animalia
- Phylum: Chordata
- Class: Amphibia
- Order: Anura
- Clade: Brachycephaloidea
- Family: Craugastoridae
- Genus: Microkayla
- Species: M. kempffi

Binomial name
- Microkayla kempffi (De la Riva, 1992)

Synonyms
- Phrynopus kempffi De la Riva, 1992; Psychrophrynella kempffi (De la Riva, 1992)

Species of frog

Microkayla kempffi is a species of frog in the family Strabomantidae. It is endemic to Bolivia where it is known from the Serranía Siberia in the Cochabamba and Santa Cruz Departments. Its natural habitats are cloud and elfin forests where it has been found near rocks along a road, under stones and logs, on moss, and on tree roots. It can be active both day and night. It is threatened by habitat loss, and potentially, by climate change.
