= Noblella vilcabambensis =

Scientific classification
- Kingdom: Animalia
- Phylum: Chordata
- Class: Amphibia
- Order: Anura
- Clade: Brachycephaloidea
- Family: Craugastoridae
- Genus: Noblella
- Species: N. vilcabambensis

Binomial name
- Noblella vilcabambensis Condori, Acevedo-Rincón, Mamani, Delgado & Chaparro, 2020

Synonyms
- Psychrophrynella vilcabambensis Condori, Acevedo-Rincón, Mamani, Delgado C., and Chaparro Auza, 2020

Species of amphibian

Noblella vilcabambensis is a species of frog in the family Craugastoridae. It is dark reddish to light brown, with grey flecks on the throat, belly, and legs. The species is endemic to Peru, and was described in 2020.

== Taxonomy ==
Noblella vilcabambensis was described in 2020, by Frank Peter Condori, Aldemar Alberto Acevedo-Rincón, Luis Mamani, Amanda Delgado, and Juan Carlos Chaparro. It was initially placed in the genus Psychrophrynella. In 2024, Psychrophrynella was made a junior synonym of Noblella.

The holotype is an adult male. The type locality is in Vilcabamba, Peru.

== Distribution ==
Noblella vilcabambensis is endemic to Peru. It is sympatric with Qosqophryne flammiventris, Nannophryne, and Proctoporus lacertus.

== Description ==
Males measure around 16.5 millimetres (0.65 in) long in snout-vent length, and females measure around 16.6 millimetres (0.65 in) long in snout-vent length.

The back is dark reddish-brown to light brown, and has dark brown markings. It is shagreen, and has small warts. The underside is smooth. The body may have a pale middorsal line from the snout to the cloaca. The flanks are dark-reddish brown. The throat is dark brown, with pale grey flecks. The belly and legs are greyish-brown, with pale grey flecks.

The snout is short and rounded. The tympanic membrane is not differentiated. The vomer lacks a dentigerous process.

The species lacks nuptial pads.

== Etymology ==
Noblella vilcabambensis is named after the Cordillera de Vilcabamba, where it was discovered.
