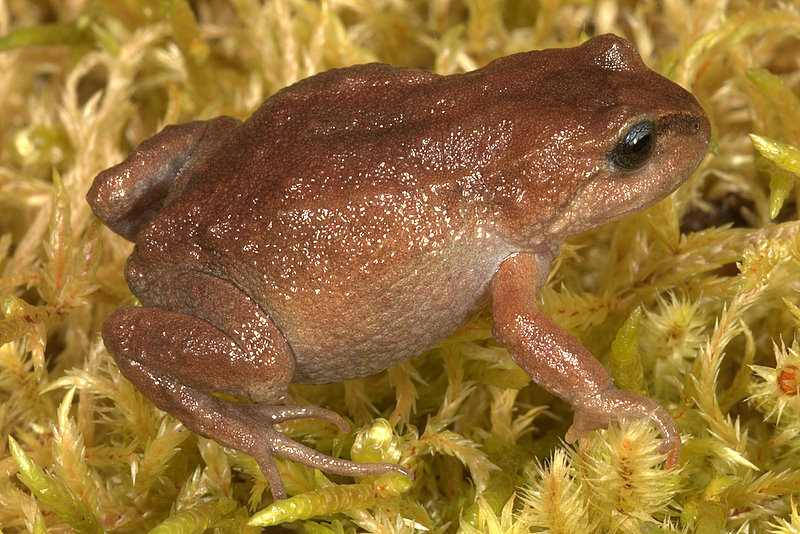

Conservation status
- Endangered (IUCN 3.1)

Scientific classification
- Kingdom: Animalia
- Phylum: Chordata
- Class: Amphibia
- Order: Anura
- Family: Strabomantidae
- Genus: Bryophryne
- Species: B. cophites

Binomial name
- Bryophryne cophites (Lynch, 1975)

Synonyms
- Phrynopus cophites Lynch, 1975

= Bryophryne cophites =

Species of frog

Bryophryne cophites, also known as the Cusco Andes frog or the Cuzco Andes frog, is a species of frog in the family Strabomantidae. It is endemic to Peru and known only from slopes of the Abra Acanacu (also spelled Acjanaco or Acanaco) in the Cordillera de Paucartambo, Cusco Region. There is an unconfirmed record from a neighboring mountain range, so this species might be more widespread than current knowledge suggests.

== Description ==
Adult males measure 18–23 mm (0.7–0.9 in) and adult females 22–29 mm (0.9–1.1 in) in snout–vent length. The head is narrower than the body. The snout is short, rounded in dorsal view and rounded to truncate in lateral view. Tympanum is absent. The canthus rostralis is moderately sharp. Skin is dorsally finely areolate, becoming coarser towards the flanks and the ventrum. The hind limbs are very short. No inter-digital webbing is present. Dorsal coloration is dull brown to pale tan, or has a mottled pattern of olive-brown and black to brown and greenish yellow or red. The venter is dull gray. The throat in males has an orange cast.

Reproduction occurs through direct development (i.e., there is no free-living larval stage): females lay about 20 eggs that hatch as 6–7 mm (0.24–0.28 in) long froglets; they guard their eggs in a nest of moss.

== Habitat and conservation ==
Bryophryne cophites is a terrestrial frog that is primarily found in wet puna grasslands and elfin forests at elevations of 3,200–3,800 m (10,500–12,500 ft) above sea level. It has also been recorded in cloud forest but is very rare in that habitat.

The species occurs in the Manú National Park. It can be very abundant in a suitable habitat, but is only known with confidence from three locations. Habitat loss is occurring along the western boundary of the park, caused by grazing cattle and fires; a fire has led to documented loss of at least one local occurrence of this species. The chytrid fungus Batrachochytrium dendrobatidis has been detected in this species, but it is not considered a threat for direct-developing frogs such as this one.
