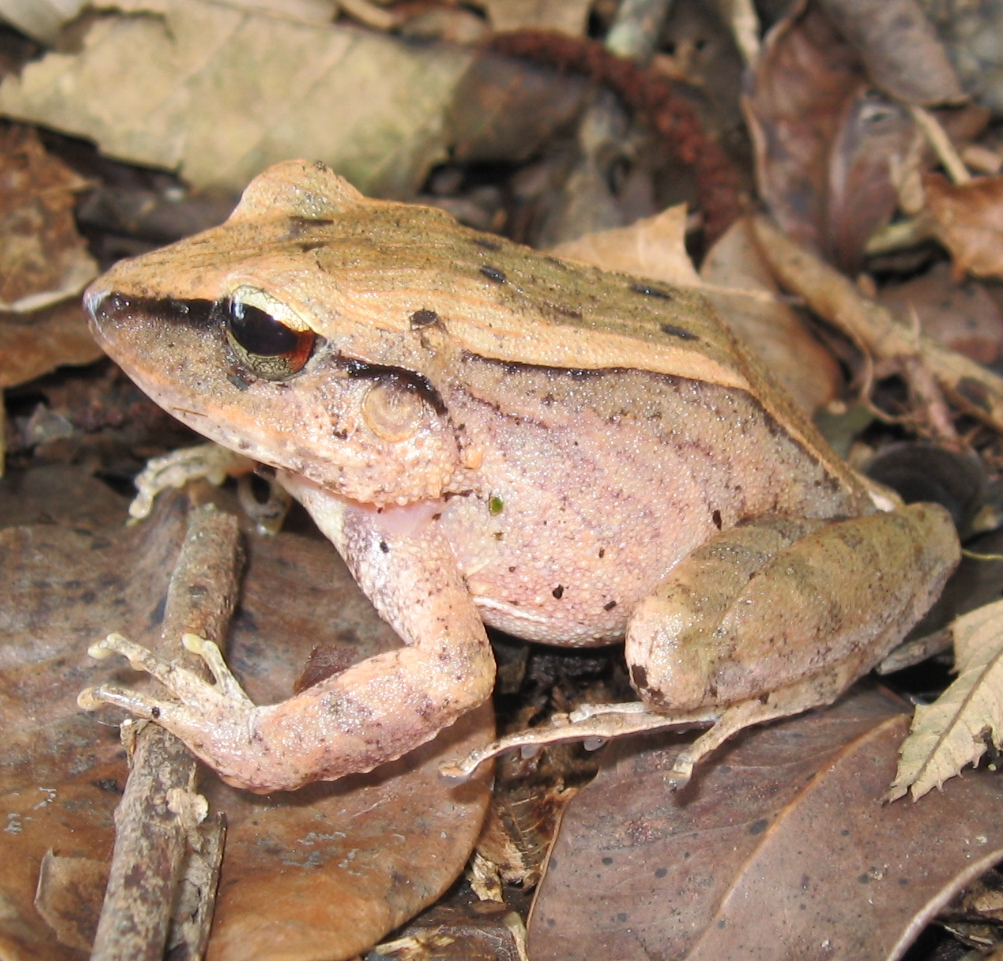

Conservation status
- Least Concern (IUCN 3.1)

Scientific classification
- Kingdom: Animalia
- Phylum: Chordata
- Class: Amphibia
- Order: Anura
- Family: Craugastoridae
- Genus: Haddadus
- Species: H. binotatus

Binomial name
- Haddadus binotatus (Spix, 1824)

= Haddadus binotatus =

Species of amphibian

Haddadus binotatus (common name: clay robber frog) is a species of frog in the family Craugastoridae. Haddadus binotatus is a very common frog. It inhabits primary and secondary forest and forest edges. It is usually found in the leaf-litter on the forest floor, or on leaves in low vegetation inside the forest.

It is endemic to the Brazilian Atlantic forest and most dominantly found in the states of Rio de Janeiro and Espírito Santo. Haddadus binotatus is a direct-developing frog and the most abundant species in the community.

Female frogs reach 64 mm (2.5 in) snout–vent length. The female of the species were larger than the males, which may result from the production of larger eggs.
