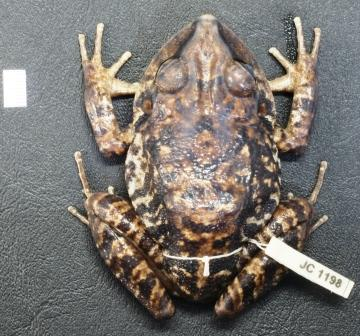

Conservation status
- Data Deficient (IUCN 3.1)

Scientific classification
- Kingdom: Animalia
- Phylum: Chordata
- Class: Amphibia
- Order: Anura
- Clade: Brachycephaloidea
- Family: Craugastoridae
- Genus: Haddadus
- Species: H. aramunha

Binomial name
- Haddadus aramunha (Cassimiro, Verdade & Rodrigues, 2008)

Synonyms
- Strabomantis aramunha

= Haddadus aramunha =

Species of frog

Haddadus aramunha is a species of frog in the family Craugastoridae. It is endemic to Bahia, Brazil, on Serra do Sincorá, at 942 to 1,207 meters above sea level. Its natural habitat is high altitude rocky open grasslands.
