= Noblella ritarasquinae =

Conservation status
- Least Concern (IUCN 3.1)

Scientific classification
- Kingdom: Animalia
- Phylum: Chordata
- Class: Amphibia
- Order: Anura
- Family: Strabomantidae
- Genus: Noblella
- Species: N. ritarasquinae

Binomial name
- Noblella ritarasquinae (Köhler, 2000)

Synonyms
- Phyllonastes ritarasquinae Köhler, 2000

Species of frog

Noblella ritarasquinae is a species of frog in the family Strabomantidae. It is endemic to Bolivia and known only from near its type locality in the San Matéo River valley, Chapare Province. The range is within the Carrasco National Park. Its natural habitat is tropical moist montane forest. It is a terrestrial, leaf-litter species.
