= Marcia Macedo =

- Education: Duke University (B.Sc.), University of Maryland, College Park (M.Sc.), Columbia University (Ph.D.)
- Occupation: Ecosystem ecologist

Marcia N. Macedo is currently a Senior Scientist and Director of the Water Program at the Woodwell Climate Research Center in Falmouth, Massachusetts. Her research focuses on how land management and agricultural expansion interact with climate change to affect connections between aquatic ecosystems and upland tropical forests. She is a first generation American with Brazilian roots.

== Early life and education ==
Macedo's paternal grandparents were from the Amazon Region, and she spent a portion of her childhood in Brazil. When she visited the Amazon for the first time at age 12, she instantly fell in love with its diversity, animals, and food. It was then that she realized she wanted to be a scientist. A decade and a half later, Macedo returned to the Amazon—this time to Suriname—to research the social structure of spider monkeys and their impact on the ecosystem. Based on her understanding of the harmful environmental impacts of processes such as gold mining and deforestation, she assisted conservation efforts to protect Amazonian spider monkeys and other primates.

In 1998, Macedo graduated from Duke University with a B.S. in Biological Anthropology & Anatomy and a Certificate in Primatology. While studying at Duke, she conducted independent research at the Duke University Medical Center, and at the university's Primate Center. She earned her M.S. in Sustainable Development & Conservation biology in 2001 from the University of Maryland, College Park. While pursuing her degree, she worked as a research associate at the Amazon Conservation Association and Conservation International in Washington, D.C. After graduation, she joined the Gordon and Betty Moore Foundation, where she helped establish the Andes-Amazon Initiative and worked as a Program Officer until 2006.

== Career ==
After earning her Ph.D. in Ecology, Evolution, and Environmental Biology at Columbia University in 2011, Macedo joined the Woodwell Climate Research Center as a postdoctoral fellow before being appointed as a staff scientist in 2014. Currently, she serves as a Senior Scientist and the Water Program Director. She is also a Research Associate at the Amazon Environmental Research Institute (Instituto de Pesquisa Ambiental da Amazônia, IPAM-Amazônia) in Brasília, Brazil. In her research, Macedo combines satellite data, modeling, and field observations to help inform forest management and land-use decisions.

=== Research ===
As an ecosystem ecologist, Macedo's current research explores land-use dynamics in both the Amazon and Cerrado ecoregions, with a particular emphasis on the environmental and societal drawbacks to agricultural extensification and intensification amidst climate change. In the Arctic, she is interested in examining how ponds are affected by wildfires. Last month, Macedo and three other scientists, under the leadership of Abra Atwood, were awarded grant funding for their project on how air temperature and land-use changes, such as housing development and the establishment of cranberry bogs, affects temperatures of coastal rivers in Massachusetts.

Macedo works at a field station run by IPAM-Amazônia in the southeastern Amazon. While she is grateful that approximately half of the Amazon has some type of legal protection (either as a protected area or Indigenous land), she says that more needs to be done to halt the rapid ecosystem changes and shifts caused by anthropogenic climate change. Macedo believes collaborative, immediate action is vital in tackling climate change and encourages people to support organizations working in countries that are most threatened by climate change.

=== Other activities ===
Macedo shares her research discoveries with diverse audiences, such as through The Climate Source project, which helps translate the information into understandable language for Indigenous communities and government land managers that provide training materials. Additionally, Macedo has participated in Indigenous-focused events at United Nations climate meetings. She is a member of a United Nations working group that discusses sustainable development in the Amazon. Macedo has also written popular science articles for the New York Times, including an article she co-wrote with Brazilian activist and policy expert Valéria Paye Pereira titled "We Know How to Stop the Fires," which was part of "The Amazon Has Seen Our Future" opinion series.

Whenever Macedo does fieldwork in the Amazon, she loves spending time with her family and friends.

== Notable publications ==
- Macedo, Marcia N.; Coe, Michael T.; DeFries, Ruth; Uriarte, Maria; Brando, Paulo M.; Neill, Christopher; Walker, Wayne S. (5 June 2013). "Land-use-driven stream warming in southeastern Amazonia". Philosophical Transactions of the Royal Society B: Biological Sciences. 368 (1619) 20120153. doi:10.1098/rstb.2012.0153. PMC 3638424.
- Macedo, Marcia N.; DeFries, Ruth S.; Morton, Douglas C.; Stickler, Claudia M.; Galford, Gillian L.; Shimabukuro, Yosio E. (24 January 2012). "Decoupling of deforestation and soy production in the southern Amazon during the late 2000s". Proceedings of the National Academy of Sciences. 109 (4): 1341–1346. doi:10.1073/pnas.1111374109. hdl:2060/20110022624. PMC 3268292.
- Castello, Leandro; Macedo, Marcia N. (March 2016). "Large‐scale degradation of Amazonian freshwater ecosystems". Global Change Biology. 22 (3): 990–1007. doi:10.1111/gcb.13173.
- Soares-Filho, Britaldo; Rajão, Raoni; Macedo, Marcia; Carneiro, Arnaldo; Costa, William; Coe, Michael; Rodrigues, Hermann; Alencar, Ane (25 April 2014). "Cracking Brazil's Forest Code". Science. 344 (6182): 363–364. doi:10.1126/science.1246663.

== Awards ==
Macedo was a Fulbright scholar at the University of Brasília and a recipient of the CHANS-Net Fellow Award.
