= Microkayla wettsteini =

Conservation status
- Vulnerable (IUCN 3.1)

Scientific classification
- Kingdom: Animalia
- Phylum: Chordata
- Class: Amphibia
- Order: Anura
- Family: Strabomantidae
- Genus: Microkayla
- Species: M. wettsteini

Binomial name
- Microkayla wettsteini (Parker, 1932)

Synonyms
- Eupsophus wettsteini Parker, 1932; Phrynopus wettsteini (Parker, 1932); Syrrhophus laplacai Cei, 1968; Phrynopus laplacai (Cei, 1968); Psychrophrynella wettsteini (Parker, 1932)

Species of frog

Microkayla wettsteini is a species of frog in the family Strabomantidae. It is endemic to Bolivia and only known from the region of Unduavi in the Unduavi Valley, Sud Yungas Province, La Paz Department. Common names Wettstein's Andes frog and LaPlaca's Andes frog have been coined for it. It is named for Otto von Wettstein, Austrian zoologist.

== Description ==
Microkayla wettsteini is a comparatively large species (maximum snout–vent length 33.4 mm (1.31 in)) and has a robust body and long limbs. The snout is rounded. The tympanic membrane is absent, whereas the tympanic annulus is visible through the skin. Tips of the digits are only slightly swollen. The toes have neither webbing nor lateral fringes. Skin is finely granular on the back and flanks and granular ventrally. The dorsum is gray or reddish-brown and may have pale spots. The venter is cream and has a variable pattern of reddish-brown spots or reticulations. Average fecundity is 13 eggs. Egg diameter is 5 mm (0.20 in).

== Habitat and conservation ==
Microkayla wettsteini occurs in upper cloud forest and humid páramo grassland at elevations of 2,900–3,900 m (9,500–12,800 ft) above sea level. Individuals have been found under stones. They can be active by day and night, including calling activity by males. The diet consists of insects.

Microkayla wettsteini is an abundant species without known major threats.
