= Pod Volunteer =

UK-based non-governmental organisation

Pod Volunteer (Personal Overseas Development) is a non-governmental volunteering organisation with an associated registered charity based in the United Kingdom.

Active since 2001, Pod Volunteer works with volunteers of all ages who visit parts of Africa, South America, and Asia with the stated goals of alleviating poverty, improving the care of animals, and engaging actively in environmental conservation. The organization has an associated charitable arm, Pod Charity (registered charity number 1139629).

== Mission and values ==
Pod Volunteer's mission is to help overseas communities in need. The organisation works to relieve poverty and improve education, health, and living conditions for socially and economically disadvantaged communities, improve care for animals in need, and protect the environment through research and conservation projects. This is achieved through providing volunteers, funding, and skills transfer. Pod provides the opportunity to directly help overseas communities in need, through volunteering, in a responsible way. The charity provides a meaningful, safe, and enjoyable volunteering experience through carefully structured, well-managed volunteer programs.

Volunteers work on joint projects with a variety of organisations focusing on educational, animal, and orphanage needs, among others. International partners include KaisKids, who work with disadvantaged children in Cambodia; SOS Bahini, who support people in need in Nepal; Villages in Africa, operating in Tanzania, based in an East African village called Yamba (located high in the West Usambara Mountains in the Tanga region); and Prapreak School in Thailand.

Volunteering projects vary from two to sixteen weeks, with the nature of the role depending on the volunteers' skills and experience. Placements engage with local communities involving teaching, sports projects, English, creative arts, community development, animal care, and film and photography projects, in addition to construction and child care. The organisation has been involved in local projects involving conservation and research work, along with wildlife roles such as monkey rescue, cheetah reintroduction, and horse rehabilitation.

== History ==
Pod Volunteer was founded in 2001 to provide a link between small charities, organisations overseas, and people from the UK wishing to do something worthwhile abroad. The founders of Pod Volunteer, Mike Beecham, Alex Tarrant, and Rachel Smith, volunteered together in Tanzania in 2001, working with the charity Tukae (registered charity number 1088468), which led to a request for volunteers to continue the work and establishment of Pod Volunteer. Pod Volunteer started sending volunteers to Tanzania in 2002, followed by Peru and Thailand. Pod Volunteer has expanded to ten countries: Belize, Cambodia, Ghana, India, Madagascar, Nepal, Peru, South Africa, Thailand, and Vietnam.

Pod Volunteer describes itself as an "ethical" organisation; Alex Tarrant, the Managing Director commented on this in an interview with GoAbroad in 2015: "we believe our ethics will set us apart from many of the other organisations in our industry who may have other short term motives, such as being profit making".

In 2010, the Pod Charity was established as a means to offer additional support to the overseas projects by providing a source of grant funding. The Pod Charity raised £68,264 from 2011 to 2014 with which they aim to:

- improve the care of animals worldwide.
- protect the environment through conservation.
- reduce poverty and improve education and living conditions for economically disadvantaged communities.

In 2014, Pod Volunteer was a finalist in the Best Volunteering Organization category at the British Youth Travel Awards.

In 2015, Pod Volunteer's campaign raised over £10,000 for relief of the victims of the April 2015 Nepal earthquake, which was responsible for more than 9,000 deaths and more than 23,000 injuries. Volunteers in Pokhara worked in conjunction with local agencies to get supplies to rural areas, assist with the reconstruction of schools, and support a center for homeless children.

== Notable projects ==
- Belize – Reef conservation in collaboration with EcoMar Turtle Watch. Wildlife Centre.
- Cambodia – Bear rescue; children's home.
- Peru – Amazon Conservation Association; children's shelter; community education. In Peru, Pod works in collaboration with GROW project, which is also partly funded by Innocent Drinks, the Rainforest Alliance certified lodge, and the "I Bought a Rainforest" project featured on the BBC.
- Thailand – Children's homes; dog and cat care; Elephant Care. summer English camps; teaching English; wildlife rescue; elephant and wildlife U18 group. Pod works in collaboration with Project AWARE to clean beaches and coral reefs and works with Reef Check, sharing data about coral reef health.
- Nepal – Volunteering with Children, a project nominated by Go Abroad for an innovative New Volunteer Program Award for Creative Arts Programmes in Nepal.

== Accreditation ==
Pod Volunteer is accredited by the following bodies:

- Member of the Year Out Group abiding by the Year Out Group Code of Practice.
- Partner of the Foreign and Commonwealth Office "Know Before You Go" campaign.
- Approved Activity Provider for Residential Trips for the Duke of Edinburgh's Award, as well as pledging to work with Right Tourism.
- Member of the Go Abroad Group.
