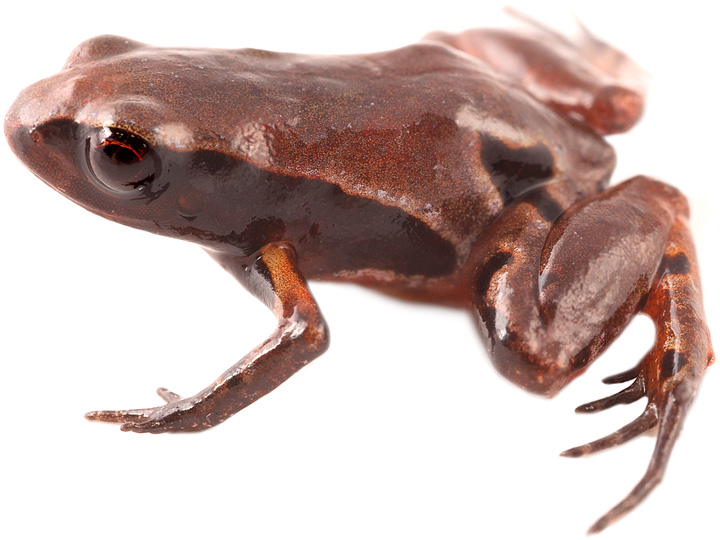

Conservation status
- Critically Endangered (IUCN 3.1)

Scientific classification
- Kingdom: Animalia
- Phylum: Chordata
- Class: Amphibia
- Order: Anura
- Clade: Brachycephaloidea
- Family: Craugastoridae
- Genus: Phyllonastes
- Species: P. coloma

Binomial name
- Phyllonastes coloma (Guayasamin and Terán-Valdez, 2009)

Synonyms
- Noblella coloma Guayasamin and Terán-Valdez, 2009

= Phyllonastes coloma =

Species of frog

Phyllonastes coloma, commonly called Coloma's noble rainfrog, is a species of frog in the family Craugastoridae. It is endemic to Ecuador, and found in the Cordillera Occidental range.

Phyllonastes coloma lives in cloud forest ecosystems, which are threatened by agricultural expansion and logging.
