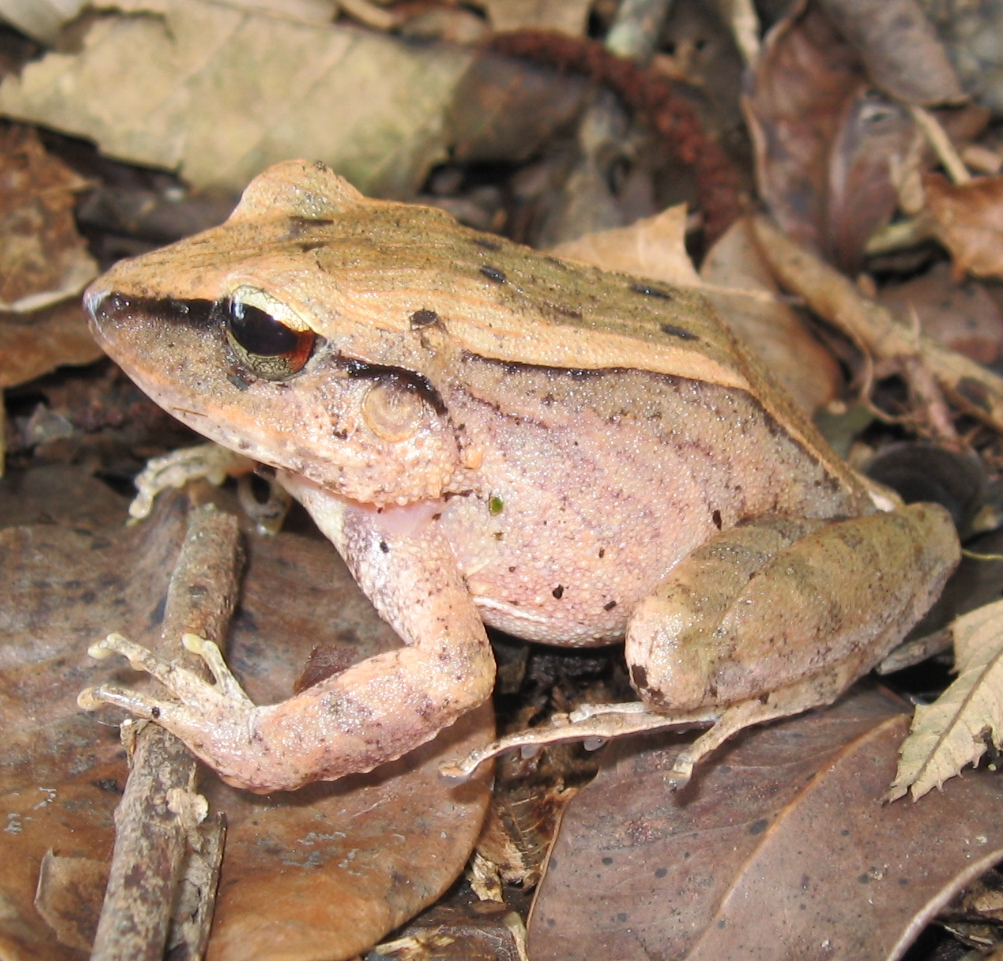
- Haddadus binotatus

Scientific classification
- Kingdom: Animalia
- Phylum: Chordata
- Class: Amphibia
- Order: Anura
- Clade: Brachycephaloidea
- Family: Craugastoridae
- Subfamily: Craugastorinae
- Genus: Haddadus; Hedges, Duellman & Heinicke, 2008

Type species
- Rana binotata Spix, 1824

Species
- 3 species, see text.

= Haddadus =

Genus of amphibians

Haddadus is a genus of frogs in the family Craugastoridae. The genus has three species that are endemic to the Atlantic Forest of east and southeast Brazil. The genus is named for Célio F. B. Haddad, Brazilian herpetologist.

== Description ==
Haddadus are small to medium-sized frogs with head narrower than body. They range in size from 17 mm (0.67 in) (snout–vent length) in only known specimen of Haddadus plicifer to 64 mm (2.5 in) in females of Haddadus binotatus.

== Species ==
The genus contains three species:

- Haddadus aramunha (Cassimiro, Verdade, and Rodrigues, 2008)
- Haddadus binotatus (Spix, 1824)
- Haddadus plicifer (Boulenger, 1888)
