= Phyllonastes myrmecoides =

Conservation status
- Least Concern (IUCN 3.1)

Scientific classification
- Kingdom: Animalia
- Phylum: Chordata
- Class: Amphibia
- Order: Anura
- Family: Strabomantidae
- Genus: Phyllonastes
- Species: P. myrmecoides

Binomial name
- Phyllonastes myrmecoides (Lynch, 1976)

Synonyms
- Euparkerella myrmecoides Lynch, 1976; Noblella myrmecoides De la Riva, Chaparro Auza, and Padial, 2008

Species of frog

Phyllonastes myrmecoides, commonly called the Loreto leaf frog, is a species of frog in the family Craugastoridae. It is found in the upper Amazon Basin of southeastern Colombia (Amazonas Department), eastern Ecuador (Orellana Province), eastern Peru (Loreto, San Martín, Huánuco, Cusco, and Madre de Dios Regions), Bolivia (Departments of Cochabamba and La Paz), and western Brazil (Amazonas).

== Etymology ==
The specific name myrmecoides is derived from Greek myrmex and -oides, meaning "ant-like", and refers to the small size of the species.

== Description ==
Phyllonastes myrmecoides is a small species: adult males measure 10–12 mm (0.39–0.47 in) and females 12–15 mm (0.47–0.59 in) in snout–vent length (SVL). The head is nearly as wide as the body and wider than it is long, and the snout is short. The tympanum is distinct. The fingers and toes are unwebbed; the fingers bear no discs whereas the tips of the toes bear dilated pads and discs. Dorsal skin is slightly granular. The coloration is variable, between light grayish brown to reddish brown. The venter is dark gray or dark brown.

A female measuring 12 mm (0.47 in) SVL contained six mature eggs 1.65–2 mm (0.065–0.079 in) in diameter. It is presumed that the development is direct, i.e., the eggs hatch directly into froglets, bypassing free-living larval stage.

== Habitat and conservation ==
Phyllonastes myrmecoides is a reasonably abundant species that inhabits lowland, premontane, and montane primary tropical moist forests at elevations between 90 and 1,200 m (300 and 3,940 ft) above sea level. It is a leaf-litter species. While much suitable habitat remains, it is locally threatened by habitat loss caused by, e.g., clear cutting and smallholder agriculture. It is present in the Manú National Park, Peru.
