= Microkayla boettgeri =

Conservation status
- Critically Endangered (IUCN 3.1)

Scientific classification
- Kingdom: Animalia
- Phylum: Chordata
- Class: Amphibia
- Order: Anura
- Family: Strabomantidae
- Genus: Microkayla
- Species: M. boettgeri

Binomial name
- Microkayla boettgeri (Lehr, 2006)

Synonyms
- Phrynopus boettgeri Lehr, 2006; Psychrophrynella boettgeri (Lehr, 2006)

Species of frog

Microkayla boettgeri is a species of frog in the family Strabomantidae. It is endemic to Peru and only known from its type locality in the Limbani District, on the Cordillera Oriental of southeastern Peru.

Microkayla boettgeri inhabit cloud forest with small bushes and trees and small streams. They are found under rocks during the day.

Deforestation is known to occur in the area of the type locality, representing a threat to this species.
