= Phyllonastes lochites =

Conservation status
- Endangered (IUCN 3.1)

Scientific classification
- Kingdom: Animalia
- Phylum: Chordata
- Class: Amphibia
- Order: Anura
- Family: Strabomantidae
- Genus: Phyllonastes
- Species: P. lochites

Binomial name
- Phyllonastes lochites (Lynch, 1976)

Synonyms
- Euparkerella lochites Lynch, 1976; Noblella lochites De la Riva, Chaparro Auza, and Padial, 2008

Species of frog

Phyllonastes lochites, also known as Ecuador leaf frog, is a species of frog in the family Strabomantidae. It is found on the Amazonian slopes of the Andes and Cordillera del Cóndor and the Cordillera de Cutucú in Ecuador and Peru; the Peruvian record has been disputed, although it is nevertheless expected that the species occurs in Peru.

== Etymology ==
The specific name lochites is Greek for "a recluse", and refers to its type locality in the comparatively remote Cordillera del Cóndor.

== Description ==
Males measure 13–15 mm (0.51–0.59 in) and females 13–19 mm (0.51–0.75 in) in snout–vent length. There is a distinctive charcoal, dark brown, or black facial mask. Tympanumic annulus and membrane are clearly visible. Dorsum has well-defined scapular and sacral chevrons and pair of suprainguinal spots, although patterns differ among individuals and few specimens are nearly patternless. Venter is diffusely pigmented in adults but mottled in juveniles. There are small circular, white dots scattered across all body surfaces.

== Habitat and conservation ==
The species' natural habitat is cloud forest and old growth and secondary forest. They are active by day, with males occasionally calling, and typically inhabit leaf litter or moss and root-covered sandy areas.

Phyllonastes lochites is a rarely encountered species, possibly because of its secretive habits. Land mines left during the Cenepa War offer protection for its range on the Cordillera del Cóndor.
