= Haddadus plicifer =

Conservation status
- Data Deficient (IUCN 3.1)

Scientific classification
- Kingdom: Animalia
- Phylum: Chordata
- Class: Amphibia
- Order: Anura
- Family: Craugastoridae
- Genus: Haddadus
- Species: H. plicifer

Binomial name
- Haddadus plicifer (Boulenger, 1888)

Species of frog

Haddadus plicifer is a species of frog in the family Craugastoridae. It is endemic to Brazil. Its natural habitat is subtropical or tropical moist lowland forests.
