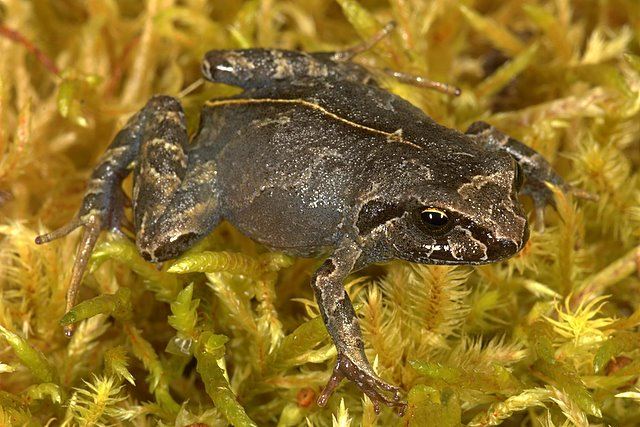

Conservation status
- Near Threatened (IUCN 3.1)

Scientific classification
- Kingdom: Animalia
- Phylum: Chordata
- Class: Amphibia
- Order: Anura
- Clade: Brachycephaloidea
- Family: Craugastoridae
- Genus: Noblella
- Species: N. usurpator

Binomial name
- Noblella usurpator (De la Riva, Chaparro, and Padial, 2008)

Synonyms
- Psychrophrynella usurpator De la Riva, Chaparro Auza, and Padial, 2008

= Noblella usurpator =

Species of amphibian

Noblella usurpator is a species of frogs in the family Craugastoridae. It is endemic to Peru and known from near Abra Acjanacu (its type locality), a mountain pass in the Cordillera de Paucartambo, the easternmost Andean range towards the Amazonian lowlands, and from the high elevation grasslands of the Manu National Park. It is named usurpator, because these frogs were previously misidentified as Noblella peruviana — in a sense, they had "usurped" the name of another frog species.

== Description ==
Noblella usurpator is a moderately robust-bodied frog with moderately long legs, without tympanic membrane but with a tympanic annulus that is visible through the skin, and rounded snout. Males measure 19.5–20.3 mm (0.77–0.80 in) and females 22.7–24.1 mm (0.89–0.95 in) in snout-vent length. Dorsum is gray to brown with smooth skin.

Males have vocal sacs and slits and call in mid-afternoon. The call is a series of short, quickly repeated, moderately high notes

== Habitat and conservation ==
Noblella usurpator inhabit puna grasslands, also bordering agricultural land, and transitional areas to montane cloud forest, at elevations of 2,800–3,600 m (9,200–11,800 ft) above sea level. They can be found within bunch grasses, under mosses, and under rocks in humid puna. This species is common in the Manú National Park and in suitable habitats outside of the park. Burning of grasslands and agricultural activities can cause habitat loss outside the park but are not believed to cause population declines. The species seems also insensitive to chytridiomycosis.
