= Phyllonastes heyeri =

Conservation status
- Least Concern (IUCN 3.1)

Scientific classification
- Kingdom: Animalia
- Phylum: Chordata
- Class: Amphibia
- Order: Anura
- Clade: Brachycephaloidea
- Family: Craugastoridae
- Genus: Phyllonastes
- Species: P. heyeri

Binomial name
- Phyllonastes heyeri Lynch, 1986

Synonyms
- Noblella heyeri De la Riva, Chaparro Auza, and Padial, 2008

Species of frog

Phyllonastes heyeri, commonly called Heyer's leaf frog, is a species of frog in the family Craugastoridae. It is found in the Huancabamba Depression in Loja Province, southern Ecuador, and Piura Region, in north-western Peru.

Its natural habitat is upper montane forest, in areas bordering pastures and other open areas, but not old growth forest. It is a terrestrial, nocturnal species living in cracks in the ground below the leaf-litter. It is hard to find, but based on the calls, it is common at least in some locations. It is threatened by habitat loss.
