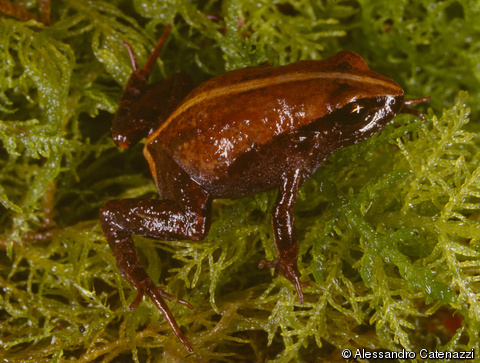

Conservation status
- Data Deficient (IUCN 3.1)

Scientific classification
- Kingdom: Animalia
- Phylum: Chordata
- Class: Amphibia
- Order: Anura
- Family: Strabomantidae
- Genus: Noblella
- Species: N. peruviana

Binomial name
- Noblella peruviana (Noble, 1921)

Synonyms
- Sminthillus peruvianus Noble, 1921; Eleutherodactylus peruvianus (Noble, 1921); Phrynopus peruvianus (Noble, 1921)

= Noblella peruviana =

Species of frog

Noblella peruviana is a species of frog in the family Strabomantidae. It is endemic to the Andean highlands in Peru.

== History and taxonomy ==
Noblella peruviana is the type species of genus Noblella. The genus was erected by Thomas Barbour to accommodate the species that had until then been known as Sminthillus peruvianus; the only other Sminthillus species was from Cuba (now known as Eleutherodactylus limbatus).

However, despite its status as defining the genus Noblella, Noblella peruviana is a little known species. Its type locality is considered to be in error; the true locality is uncertain but may be in the Puno Region. In the literature, it has also been mixed with Pleurodema marmorata from Bolivia and with Psychrophrynella usurpator from Peru.

== Description ==
The holotype measures 16 mm (0.63 in) in snout–vent length. The following description is from the original species description by Gladwyn Kingsley Noble:

Snout rounded, equal to the greatest diameter of the orbit; loreal region abrupt, nearly vertical; nostril midway between the tip of the snout and the anterior corner of the eye; interorbital space a little broader than the upper eyelid; horizontal diameter of the tympanum about one-half, vertical diameter nearly two-thirds the greatest width of the eye; tympanum about one-half its smallest diameter from the latter. Digits pointed, no terminal disks; a well-developed tarsal and two metatarsal tubercles. Tibio-tarsal articulation reaching just beyond the posterior angle of the eye; when the limbs are held vertical to the axis of the body, the tibio-tarsal articulation overlapping its mate of the opposite side. Skin feebly granular above, smooth below.

Color uniform grayish brown, slightly purplish above; a broad band of dark brown extending on each side from the nostril to the lumbar region; a narrow white line on the posterior face of each thigh joining with a median line which extends anteriorly along the back for more than half its length; posterior surfaces of the lower leg indistinctly barred with dark brown. Lower surfaces of body whitish, the chin and thigh indistinctly suffused with brown.

== Habitat and ecology ==
Reflecting the uncertainty regarding its type locality, habitat and ecology of Noblella peruviana are unknown.
