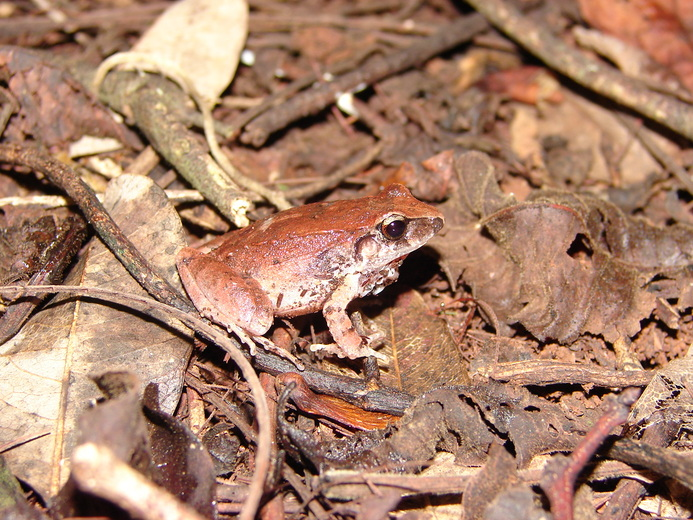

Conservation status
- Least Concern (IUCN 3.1)

Scientific classification
- Kingdom: Animalia
- Phylum: Chordata
- Class: Amphibia
- Order: Anura
- Family: Strabomantidae
- Genus: Barycholos
- Species: B. ternetzi

Binomial name
- Barycholos ternetzi (Miranda-Ribeiro, 1937)

Synonyms
- Paludicola ternetzi Miranda-Ribeiro, 1937; Physalaemus ternetzi (Miranda-Ribeiro, 1937); Barycholos savagei Lynch, 1980

= Barycholos ternetzi =

Species of frog

Barycholos ternetzi is a species of frog in the family Strabomantidae. It is endemic to the Cerrado of central Brazil. Its natural habitats are gallery forest and open areas in the Cerrado. It lives in the leaf-litter. This common species is declining. It is threatened by habitat loss caused by many sources (agriculture, logging, agricultural pollution, fires and dam construction). Four different vocalization of the Barycholos ternetzi have been identified. The advertisement call is the most common, an aggressive call is emitted in response to a male that is in the vicinity or neighbor male, a distress call is released when the male is found or caught, and lastly the fighting call is emitted during physical interactions.
