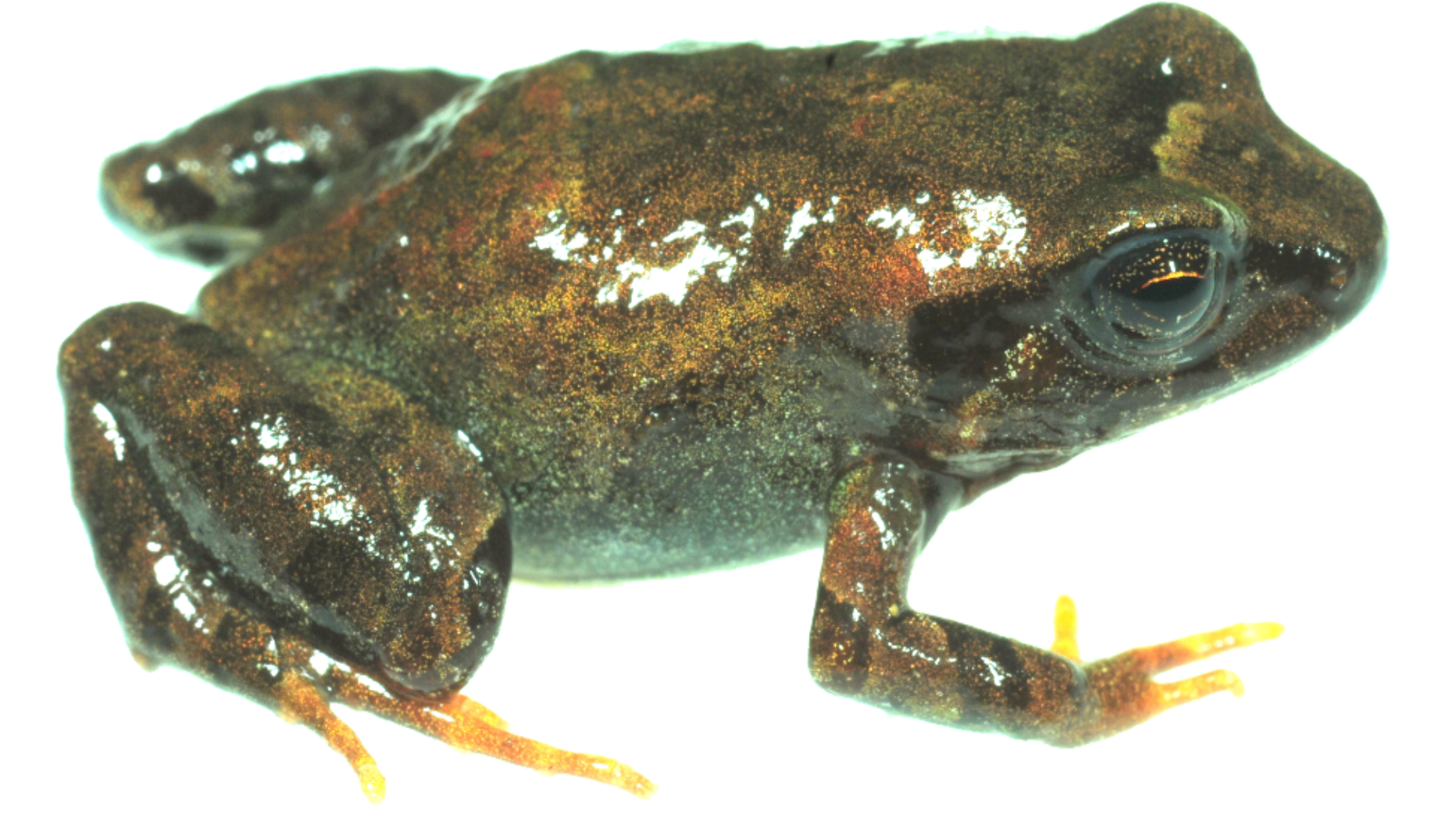
- Holotype, an adult male

Conservation status
- Least Concern (IUCN 3.1)

Scientific classification
- Kingdom: Animalia
- Phylum: Chordata
- Class: Amphibia
- Order: Anura
- Clade: Brachycephaloidea
- Family: Craugastoridae
- Genus: Noblella
- Species: N. chirihampatu

Binomial name
- Noblella chirihampatu (Catenazzi and Ttito, 2016)

Synonyms
- Psychrophrynella chirihampatu Catenazzi and Ttito, 2016

= Noblella chirihampatu =

Species of amphibian

Noblella chirihampatu is a species of frogs in the family Craugastoridae. It is endemic to Peru and known only from its type locality, the Japumato Valley in the Peruvian Andes of the Cusco. The common name Japumayo Andes frog has been coined for this species.

== Etymology ==
The specific name chirihampatu is a combination of Quechua words meaning "cold toad" (chiri hamp'atu).

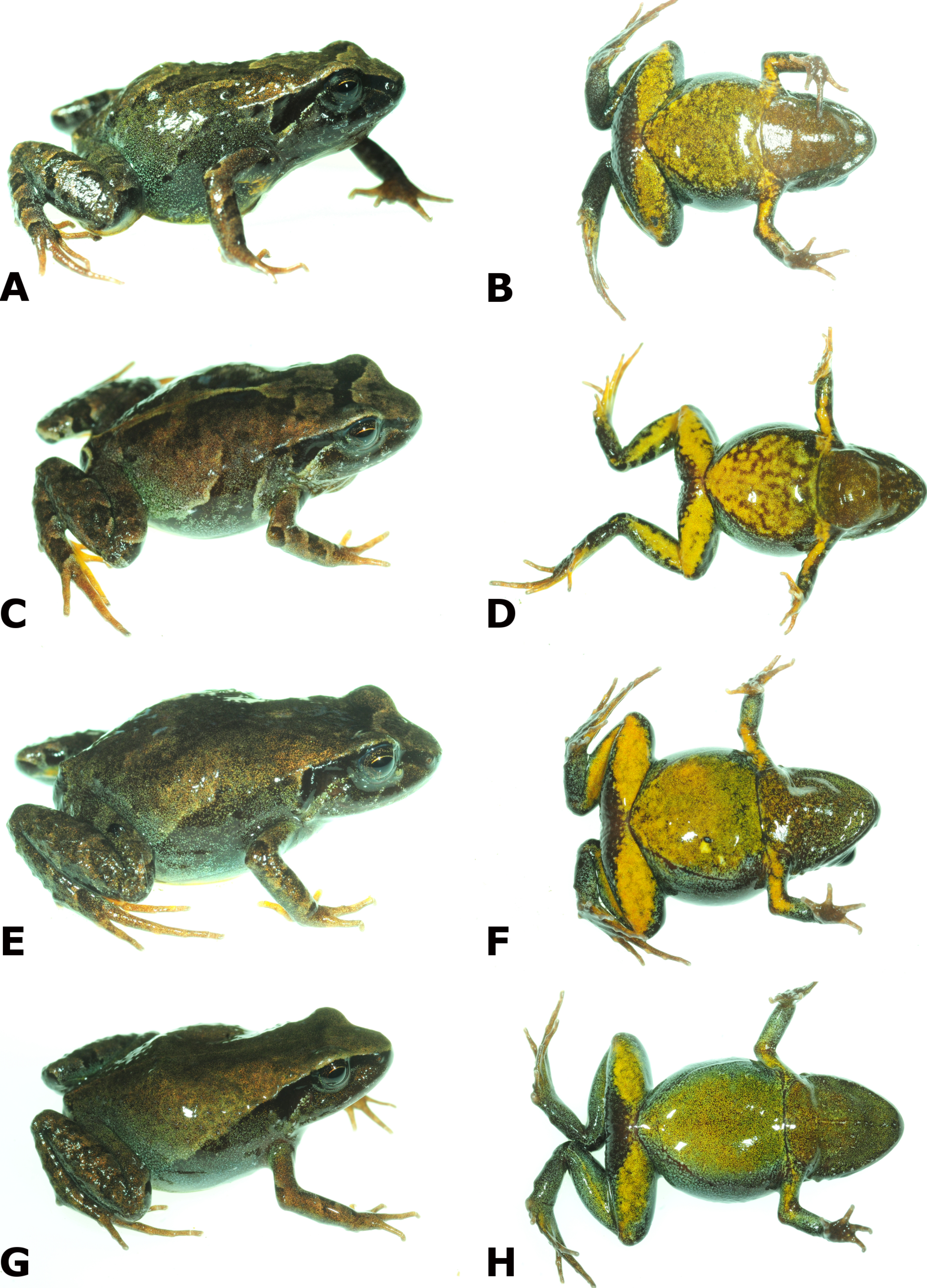
Dorsolateral (left) and ventral (right) views of two males and two females.

== Description ==
Males measure 16–24 mm (0.63–0.94 in) and females 23–28 mm (0.91–1.10 in) in snout–vent length. Skin on the dorsum is finely shagreen, with some small warts forming linear ridges at mid dorsum. Skin on the venter is smooth. The tympanic membrane is not differentiated and the tympanic annulus is barely visible below skin. The snout is bluntly rounded. Neither fingers nor toes have lateral fringes or webbing. The dorsal color varies considerably between individuals: the dorsum is tan to brown and gray, with dark brown markings; some individuals have a yellow or orange mid-dorsal line. An inter-orbital bar is present. The chest, venter and ventral parts of the arms and legs are yellow with brown flecks. The throat and palmar and plantar surfaces brown or reddish-brown. Males have vocal sac and vocal slits but no nuptial pads.

== Reproduction ==
Males have been observed calling during the day. The advertisement call is composed of multiple notes; the call of the holotype lasted 1–4.5 seconds and consisted of 10–68 single-pulsed notes. Female fecundity is 7–12 eggs. In one nest, eleven unattended eggs measuring about 4.5 mm (0.18 in) in diameter were found.

== Habitat and conservation ==
Noblella chirihampatu has been found in areas of disturbed montane forest vegetation, often along the forest edges bordering landslides and other open areas. It is known from elevations of 2,550–3,180 m (8,370–10,430 ft) above sea level.

This species has been assessed as of least concern by the International Union for Conservation of Nature (IUCN). The surveyed populations are relatively large, and no direct threats are currently known—the species might actually benefit from some habitat disturbance. The known range is within a protected area.

Noblella chirihampatu is only known from the Japumato Valley in the Peruvian Andes
