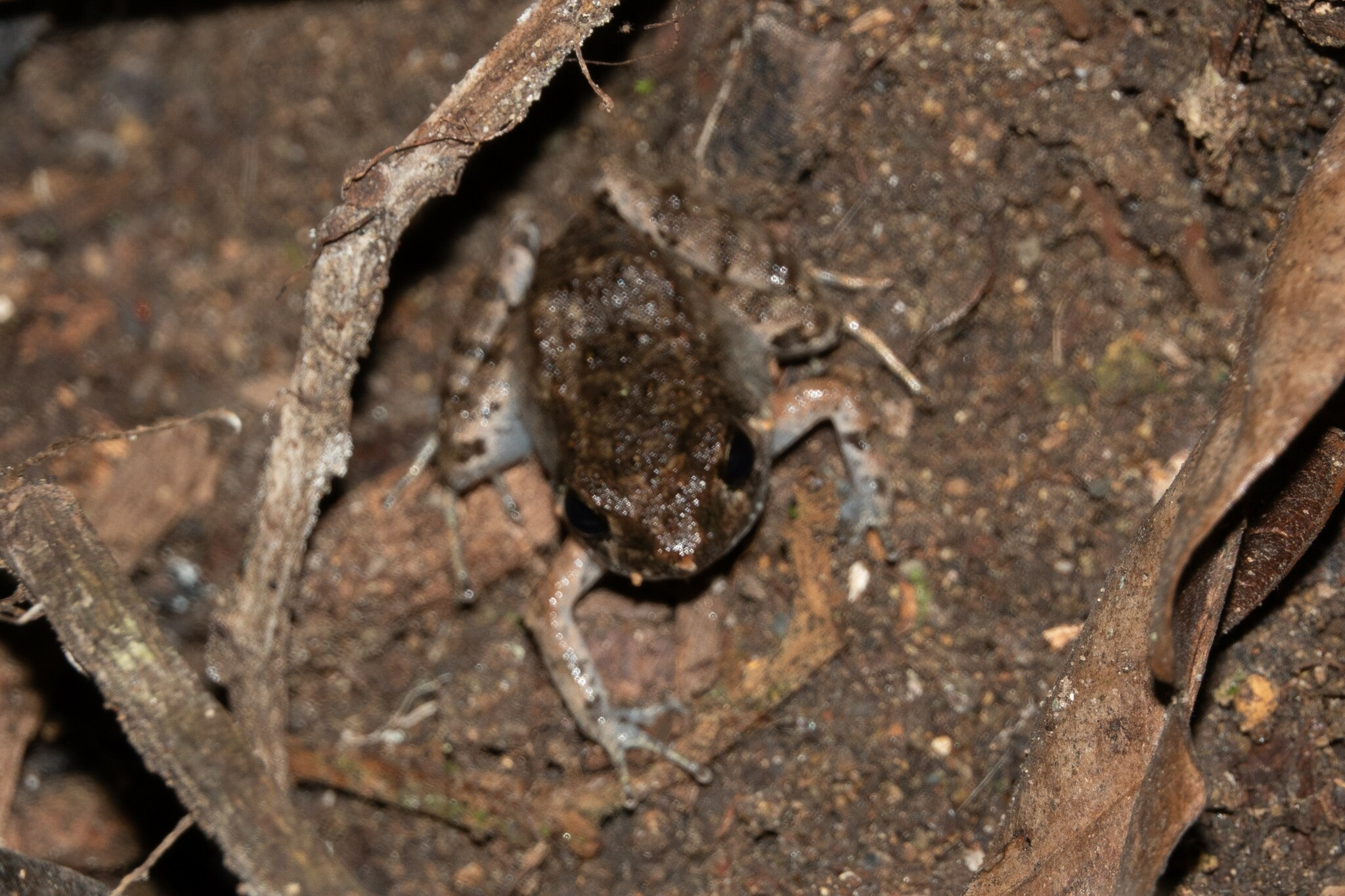

Conservation status
- Least Concern (IUCN 3.1)

Scientific classification
- Kingdom: Animalia
- Phylum: Chordata
- Class: Amphibia
- Order: Anura
- Family: Strabomantidae
- Genus: Barycholos
- Species: B. pulcher

Binomial name
- Barycholos pulcher (Boulenger, 1898)

Synonyms
- Leptodactylus pulcher Boulenger, 1898

= Barycholos pulcher =

Species of frog

Barycholos pulcher is a species of frog in the family Strabomantidae. It is endemic to the Pacific lowlands of Ecuador, up to 600 m (2,000 ft) asl.

Its natural habitat is tropical moist lowland forest. It can also live in secondary forest, provided that habitats with leaf-litter are available. This locally common species is threatened by habitat loss and pollution.
