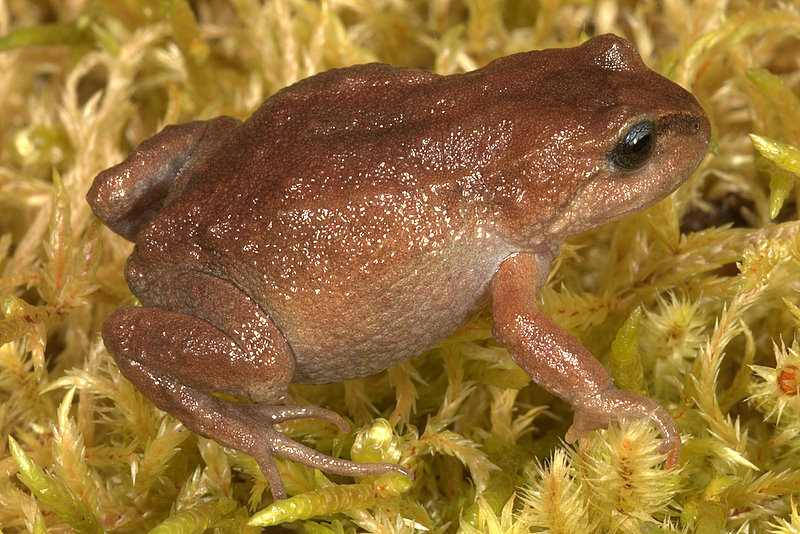
- Bryophryne cophites

Scientific classification
- Kingdom: Animalia
- Phylum: Chordata
- Class: Amphibia
- Order: Anura
- Clade: Brachycephaloidea
- Family: Craugastoridae
- Subfamily: Holoadeninae
- Genus: Bryophryne; Hedges, Duellman, and Heinicke, 2008

Type species
- Phrynopus cophites Lynch, 1975

Diversity
- 13 species (see text)

= Bryophryne =

Genus of amphibians

Bryophryne is a genus of frogs in the family Strabomantidae. These frogs are endemic to south-eastern Peru in the Cusco Region, with an undescribed species from the Puno Region. Their range is separated from that of Phrynopus by the Apurímac River valley.

== Taxonomy ==
The genus Bryophryne was erected in 2008 to accommodate two species that were in Phrynopus at that time; subfamily Holoadeninae was erected at the same time and placed in Strabomantidae.

== Description ==
Species of the genus Bryophryne are smallish frogs, reaching maximum snout–vent length of 29.3 mm (1.15 in) in Bryophryne cophites. Head is narrower than the body. Differentiated tympanic membrane, tympanic annulus, columella, and cavum tympanicum are absent. Dorsum is finely areolate whereas venter is coarsely areolate.

== Species ==
The following species are recognised in the genus Bryophryne:

- Bryophryne abramalagae Lehr and Catenazzi, 2010
- Bryophryne bakersfield Chaparro, Padial, Gutiérrez, and De la Riva, 2015
- Bryophryne bustamantei (Chaparro, De la Riva, Padial, Ochoa, and Lehr, 2007)
- Bryophryne cophites (Lynch, 1975)
- Bryophryne hanssaueri Lehr and Catenazzi, 2009
- Bryophryne nubilosus Lehr and Catenazzi, 2008
- Bryophryne phuyuhampatu Catenazzi, Ttito, Diaz and Shepack, 2017
- Bryophryne quellokunka De la Riva, Chaparro, Castroviejo-Fisher, and Padial, 2017
- Bryophryne tocra De la Riva, Chaparro, Castroviejo-Fisher, and Padial, 2017
- Bryophryne wilakunka De la Riva, Chaparro, Castroviejo-Fisher, and Padial, 2017
- Bryophryne zonalis Lehr and Catenazzi, 2009

Three species from southern Peru, formerly classified in the genus Bryophryne, were re-assigned to a new genus Qosqophryne after a phylogenetic analysis determined that the genus Qosqophryne was sister to the genus Microkayla and that this clade was more closely related to Noblella and Psychrophrynella than to other species in the genus Bryophryne.
