= Pachydactylus maraisi =

Conservation status
- Near Threatened (IUCN 3.1)

Scientific classification
- Kingdom: Animalia
- Phylum: Chordata
- Class: Reptilia
- Order: Squamata
- Suborder: Gekkota
- Family: Gekkonidae
- Genus: Pachydactylus
- Species: P. maraisi

Binomial name
- Pachydactylus maraisi Heinicke, Adderly, Bauer & Jackman, 2011

Species of lizard

Pachydactylus maraisi is a species of lizard in the family Gekkonidae. The species is endemic to Namibia.

== Etymology ==
The specific name, maraisi is in honor of African herpetologist Johan Marais.

== Geographic range ==
P. maraisi is found in coastal central Namibia.

== Description ==
Dorsally, P. maraisi is dark brown, with white flecks. Adults may attain a snout-to-vent length (SVL) of about 4 cm (1.6 in).

== Behavior ==
P. maraisi is rupicolous (rock-dwelling).

== Reproduction ==
The mode of reproduction of P. maraisi is unknown.
