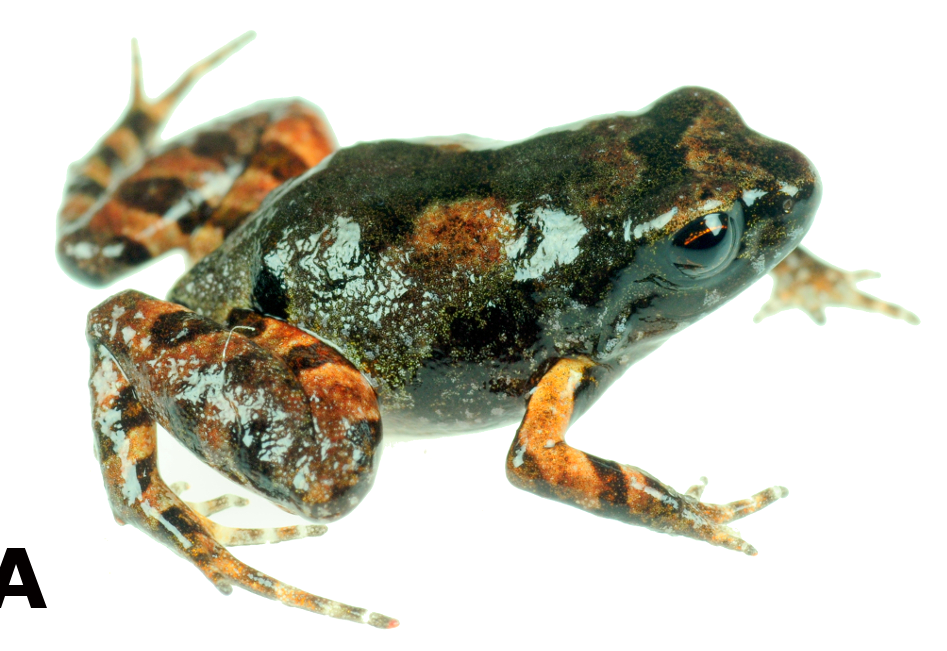

Scientific classification
- Kingdom: Animalia
- Phylum: Chordata
- Class: Amphibia
- Order: Anura
- Clade: Brachycephaloidea
- Family: Craugastoridae
- Genus: Noblella
- Species: N. thiuni

Binomial name
- Noblella thiuni Catenazzi and Ttito, 2019

= Noblella thiuni =

Species of frog

Noblella thiuni is a species of frog in Peru. It is 11 mm (0.43 in) in length placing it as one of the smallest amphibians in the world. It lives in the leaf litter of a montane forest making it difficult to spot. This minute frog has the dorsum tan with a dark brown X-shaped middorsal mark and dark brown markings, the chest and belly copper reddish with a profusion of silvery spots, the ventral surfaces of legs bright red, and the throat and palmar and plantar surfaces brown. The species was discovered in 2017 near Thiuni, in the province of Carabaya, Department of Puno, in the upper watershed of a tributary of the Inambari River, Peru, and is known only from a single specimen.
