= Holoaden =

Scientific classification
- Kingdom: Animalia
- Phylum: Chordata
- Class: Amphibia
- Order: Anura
- Clade: Brachycephaloidea
- Family: Craugastoridae
- Subfamily: Holoadeninae
- Genus: Holoaden; Miranda-Ribeiro, 1920

Diversity
- 4 species (see text)

Genus of amphibians

Holoaden, the highland frogs, is a small genus of frogs in the family Strabomantidae. The species are endemic to south-eastern Brazil.

== Taxonomy ==
Holoaden is the type genus of subfamily Holoadeninae that was erected in 2008 and placed in the newly erected family Strabomantidae. Prior to this, it had been placed in the genus Brachycephalidae.

== Description ==
Holoaden grow to 48 mm (1.9 in) snout–vent length at most. Head is narrower than the body. Differentiated tympanic membrane and tympanic annulus are absent. Dorsum is highly glandular. Venter is areolate.

== Species ==
There are four recognized species in this genus:

- Holoaden bradei Lutz, 1958
- Holoaden luederwaldti Miranda-Ribeiro, 1920
- Holoaden pholeter Pombal, Siqueira, Dorigo, Vrcibradic, and Rocha, 2008
- Holoaden suarezi Martins and Zaher, 2013
