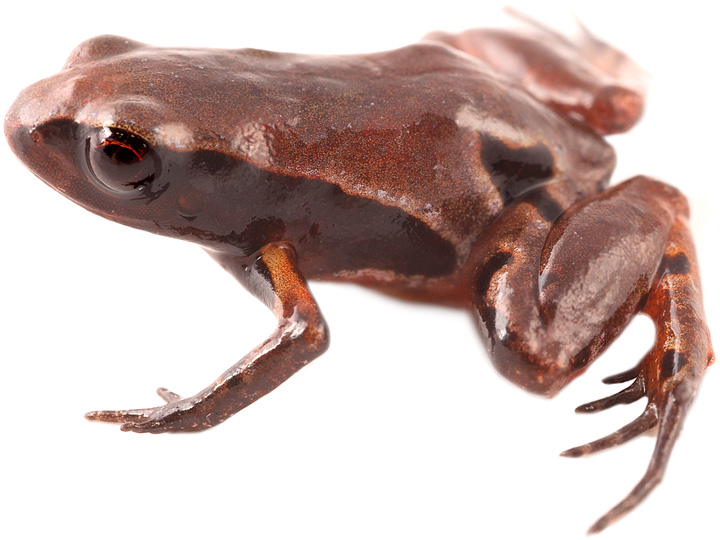
- P. coloma

Scientific classification
- Kingdom: Animalia
- Phylum: Chordata
- Class: Amphibia
- Order: Anura
- Clade: Brachycephaloidea
- Family: Craugastoridae
- Subfamily: Holoadeninae
- Genus: Phyllonastes; Heyer, 1977

Type species
- Euparkerella myrmecoides Lynch, 1976

Species
- 16 (see text)

= Phyllonastes =

Genus of amphibians

Phyllonastes is a genus of frogs in the family Craugastoridae.

== Taxonomy ==
Phyllonastes was relegated to a junior synonym of Noblella in 2008. However, this resulted in polyphyly within Noblella, and the genus was resurrected in 2024.

== Species ==
The following species are recognised in the genus Phyllonastes as of July 2026:

- Phyllonastes arutam (Brito-Zapata, Chávez-Reyes, Pallo-Robles, Carrión-Olmedo, Cisneros-Heredia, and Reyes-Puig, 2024)
- Phyllonastes cerrogolondrinas Ortega, Cisneros-Heredia, Camper, Romero-Carvajal, Negrete, and Ron, 2025
- Phyllonastes coloma (Guayasamin and Terán-Valdez, 2009)
- Phyllonastes dicaprioi Ortega et al., 2025
- Phyllonastes ecuadoriensis Ortega et al., 2025
- Phyllonastes heyeri Lynch, 1986
- Phyllonastes lochites (Lynch, 1976)
- Phyllonastes lynchi Duellman, 1991
- Phyllonastes macuma Ortega et al., 2025
- Phyllonastes mindo (Reyes-Puig, Guayasamin, Koch, Brito-Zapata, Hollanders, Costales, and Cisneros-Heredia, 2021)
- Phyllonastes myrmecoides (Lynch, 1976)
- Phyllonastes naturetrekii (Reyes-Puig, Reyes-Puig, Ron, Ortega, Guayasamin, Goodrum, Recalde, Vieira, Koch, and Yánez-Muñoz, 2019)
- Phyllonastes personinus (Harvey, Almendáriz, Brito-M., and Batallas-R., 2013)
- Phyllonastes plateadensis Ortega et al., 2025
- Phyllonastes sardinayacu Ortega et al., 2025
- Phyllonastes worleyae (Reyes-Puig, Maynard, Trageser, Vieira, Hamilton, Lynch, Culebras, Kohn, Brito, and Guayasamin, 2020)
