= Pristimantis salaputium =

Conservation status
- Least Concern (IUCN 3.1)

Scientific classification
- Kingdom: Animalia
- Phylum: Chordata
- Class: Amphibia
- Order: Anura
- Family: Strabomantidae
- Genus: Pristimantis
- Subgenus: Pristimantis
- Species: P. salaputium

Binomial name
- Pristimantis salaputium (Duellman, 1978)

Synonyms
- Eleutherodactylus salaputium Duellman, 1978

Species of frog

Pristimantis salaputium is a species of frog in the family Strabomantidae. It is endemic to Peru and known from its type locality, the Río Cosñipata Valley, on the northeastern slopes of the Cadena de Paucartambo, a frontal range of the Cordillera Oriental in Cusco Region, and from the Apurímac River valley. Its range might extend into Bolivia. The specific name salaputium is Latin meaning "dwarf" and refers to the small size of this species. Common name river robber frog has been coined for it.

== Description ==
Adult males measure 16–19 mm (0.6–0.7 in) in snout–vent length; two juveniles measured 13 and 15 mm (0.5 and 0.6 in). The body is moderately robust. The head is slightly longer than it is wide. The snout is short and bluntly rounded in dorsal view, rounded in profile. The tympanum is distinct. The fingers and the toes have lateral fringes and expanded discs; the toes have also basal webbing. Dorsal skin is finely shagreened. The dorsum is reddish brown and has dark brown markings. An orange middorsal stripe may be present. The groin and the dorsal surfaces of the thighs are yellowish green bearing dark brown markings. The venter is gray. The iris is dull bronze and has a median horizontal reddish brown streak.

== Habitat and conservation ==
Pristimantis salaputium is known from montane cloud forest at an elevation of about 1,700 m (5,600 ft) above sea level in areas with some tree ferns, bromeliads, and abundant undergrowth of mosses and ferns. Note that the Amphibian Species of the World gives a much wider altitudinal range, 1,500–2,400 m (4,900–7,900 ft). Specimens have been found on low herbaceous plants at night. Development is presumably direct (i.e., there is no free-living larval stage).

It is a frequently encountered species but with very limited known distribution, perhaps because it is mixed with other similar species (e.g., Pristimantis platydactylus). A specimen infected with Batrachochytrium dendrobatidis has been found, but craugastorid frogs do not seem to be adversely affected by such infections. The Río Cosñipata Valley part of the range of this species is within the Manu National Park and its buffer zone.
