= Noblella pygmaea =

Conservation status
- Least Concern (IUCN 3.1)

Scientific classification
- Kingdom: Animalia
- Phylum: Chordata
- Class: Amphibia
- Order: Anura
- Clade: Brachycephaloidea
- Family: Craugastoridae
- Genus: Noblella
- Species: N. pygmaea

Binomial name
- Noblella pygmaea Lehr and Catenazzi, 2009

Species of amphibian

Noblella pygmaea, commonly known as Noble's pygmy frog, is a species of frog in the family Craugastoridae. It is one of the smallest known frogs. The body is dark brown, grey, and tan, and the iris is dark brown. The species is endemic to Peru.

Noblella pygmaea was described in 2009, and is listed as of Least Concern by the IUCN.

== Taxonomy ==
Noblella pygmaea was described in 2009, by Edgar Lehr and Alessandro Catenazzi.

The type locality is at Wayqecha Biological Station, Peru. The holotype is a gravid female.

== Distribution ==
Noblella pygmaea is endemic to Peru. It is known from two locations in southern Peru, and is found at elevations of 2,380–3,485 metres (7,808–11,434 ft). The species inhabits puna grasslands, montane scrubland, and cloud forest environments.

Noblella pygmaea is syntopic with Bryophryne nubilosus.

== Description ==
In females, the snout-vent length is 11.3–12.4 millimetres (0.44–0.49 in). In males, the snout-vent length is 10.3–11.1 millimetres (0.41–0.44 in). When discovered, the species was the smallest known Andean frog, and is one of the world's smallest frogs.

The back is dark brown, dark grey, and tan, with a pale grey or tan stripe from the upper eyelid to the thighs. The throat, chest, belly, and thighs are reddish brown, with small grey spots. The flanks may be dark brown or pale grey. The back has tubercles, which are denser on the back of the body.

The head is narrower than the body. A tympanum is present. The vomer lacks a dentigerous process. The choanae are small and rounded. The nostrils do not protrude. The canthus is dorsally curved, and rounded in profile. The upper eyelid has small tubercles. The iris is dark brown, with gold spots. The pupil is surrounded by an orange ring.

Noblella pygmaea lacks nuptial pads.

Noblella pygmaea is mainly terrestrial, and is assumed to undergo direct development.

== Conservation ==
In 2017, the IUCN assessed Noblella pygmaea as of Least Concern. It is thought to have a wide distribution, and a stable population. The species is found in protected areas, including Manu National Park and Wayqecha Biological Station. It may be threatened by fires.

== Etymology ==
The specific epithet pygmaea is derived from the Latin pygmaeus, meaning "dwarf". It refers to the species' small size.
