= Wayqecha Biological Station =

Peruvian research station

The Wayqecha Biological Station is a tropical ecological research station near Peru's Manú National Park. This research station is located (13°10'38.06"S, 71°36'16.36"W) in the upper reaches of the river Cosñipata, an affluent of the Madre de Dios River, in the Paucartambo Province, Cusco Region. The station ranges from 2200 to 3700 m in elevation and includes several Andean ecosystems, such as montane forests, elfin forests, montane scrub and high-Andean grassland (puna). These ecosystems are connected by a series of trails and by the road Paucartambo-Shintuya. The station was established in 2005 and is managed by two non-governmental organizations: the Peruvian NGO Asociación para la Conservación de la Cuenca Amazónica (ACCA) and the US-based Amazon Conservation Association (ACA), which also manages the Los Amigos Biological Station in the lowland rainforest of southeastern Peru.

Current research at Wayqecha includes a multidisciplinary project studying carbon cycling in soils and montane forests and their response to climate change, and studies of plant and animal diversity patterns along the Andean elevational gradient. Wayqecha hosted a field course of the Organization for Tropical Studies in 2007.

== Access ==
Wayqecha is located along the Paucartambo-Shintuya road, approximately 1 hour east of Paucartambo and 4–5 hours east of Cusco, the nearest city.

== Gallery ==
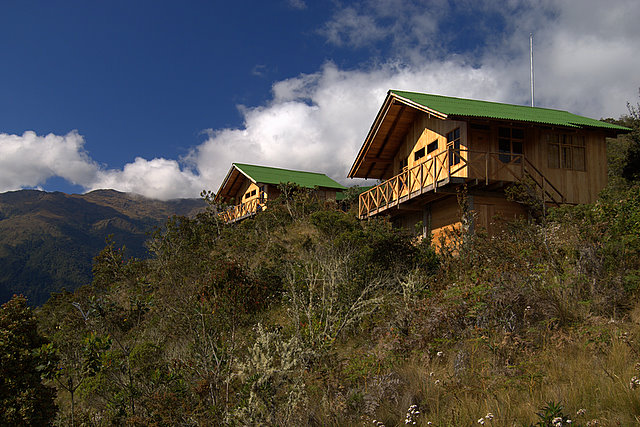
Wayqecha Biological Station

Montane forest at 3200 m elevation

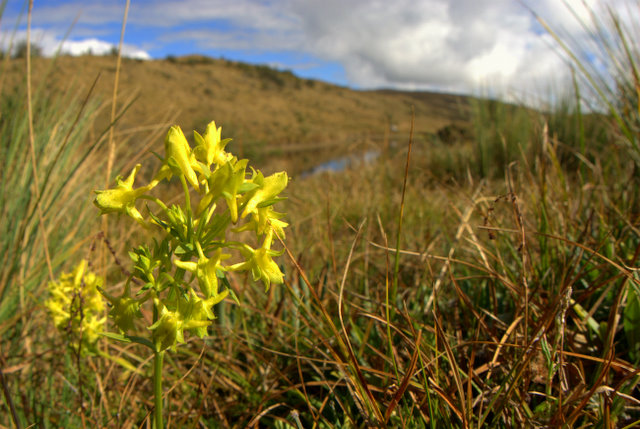
A Gentian flower in the Andean grassland above Wayqecha, Halenia sp.

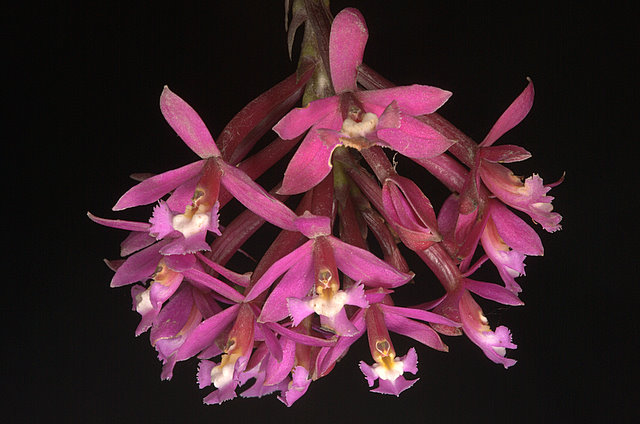
Epidendrum secundum, a common orchid at Wayqecha

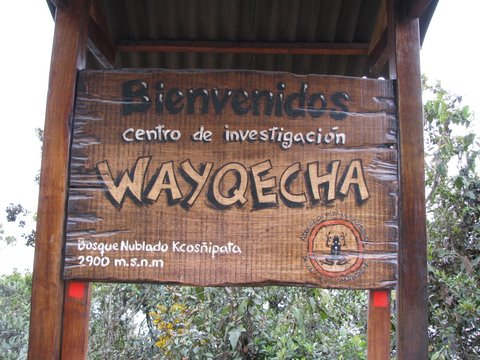
Welcome sign to the station

== See also ==
- Cocha Cashu Biological Station
