= Microkayla =

Scientific classification
- Kingdom: Animalia
- Phylum: Chordata
- Class: Amphibia
- Order: Anura
- Clade: Brachycephaloidea
- Family: Craugastoridae
- Subfamily: Holoadeninae
- Genus: Microkayla; De la Riva, Chaparro, Castroviejo-Fisher, and Padial, 2017

Diversity
- See text

Genus of amphibians

Microkayla is a genus of frogs in the family Strabomantidae.

== Species ==
The following species are recognised in the genus Microkayla:

- Microkayla adenopleura (Aguayo-Vedia and Harvey, 2001)
- Microkayla ankohuma (Padial and De la Riva, 2007)
- Microkayla boettgeri (Lehr, 2006)
- Microkayla chacaltaya (De la Riva, Padial, and Cortéz, 2007)
- Microkayla chapi De la Riva, Chaparro, Castroviejo-Fisher, and Padial, 2017
- Microkayla chaupi (De la Riva and Aparicio, 2016)
- Microkayla chilina De la Riva, Chaparro, Castroviejo-Fisher, and Padial, 2017
- Microkayla colla (De la Riva, Aparicio, Soto, and Ríos, 2016)
- Microkayla condoriri (De la Riva, Aguayo, and Padial, 2007)
- Microkayla guillei (De la Riva, 2007)
- Microkayla harveyi (Muñoz, Aguayo, and De la Riva, 2007)
- Microkayla huayna De la Riva, Cortez F., and Burrowes, 2017
- Microkayla iani (De la Riva, Reichle, and Cortéz, 2007)
- Microkayla iatamasi (Aguayo-Vedia and Harvey, 2001)
- Microkayla illampu (De la Riva, Reichle, and Padial, 2007)
- Microkayla illimani (De la Riva and Padial, 2007)
- Microkayla kallawaya (De la Riva and Martínez-Solano, 2007)
- Microkayla katantika (De la Riva and Martínez-Solano, 2007)
- Microkayla kempffi (De la Riva, 1992)
- Microkayla melanocheira (De la Riva, Ríos, and Aparicio, 2016)
- Microkayla pinguis (Harvey and Ergueta-Sandoval, 1998)
- Microkayla quimsacruzis (De la Riva, Reichle, and Bosch, 2007)
- Microkayla saltator (De la Riva, Reichle, and Bosch, 2007)
- Microkayla teqta (De la Riva and Burrowes, 2014)
- Microkayla wettsteini (Parker, 1932)
