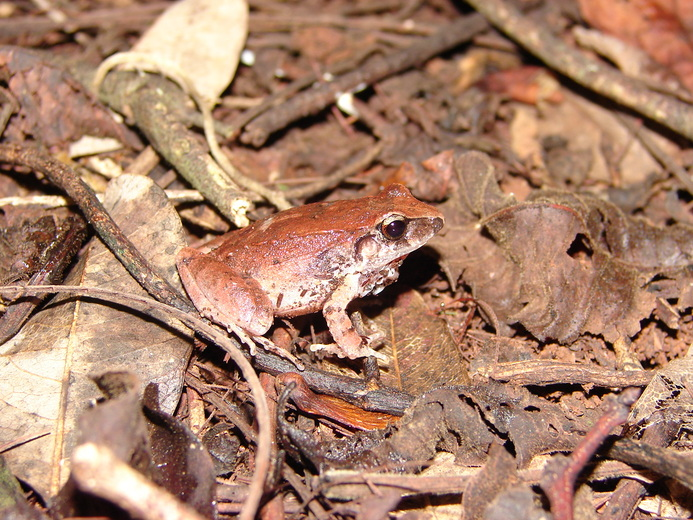
- Barycholos ternetzi

Scientific classification
- Kingdom: Animalia
- Phylum: Chordata
- Class: Amphibia
- Order: Anura
- Family: Strabomantidae
- Subfamily: Holoadeninae
- Genus: Barycholos; Heyer, 1969

Type species
- Leptodactylus pulcher Boulenger, 1898

Species
- See text.

= Barycholos =

Genus of amphibians

Barycholos, common name Chimbo frogs, is a genus of small frogs in the family Strabomantidae found in south-eastern Brazil and tropical lowland Ecuador. The name Barycholos, from the Greek βαρύχολος ("savage"), is in honor of herpetologist Jay M. Savage.

== Species ==
There are two species:

- Barycholos pulcher (Boulenger, 1898)
- Barycholos ternetzi (Miranda-Ribeiro, 1937)
