= Amazon Conservation Association =

US-based non-profit organization

- Type: Non-governmental organization
- Founded: 1999
- Headquarters: Washington, DC
- Revenue: 7,834,629 United States dollar (2016)
- Total assets: 3,778,335 United States dollar (2022)
- Website: www.amazonconservation.org

Amazon Conservation Association (ACA) is a 501(c)(3) non-profit organization working to conserve the biodiversity of the Amazon basin through the development of new scientific understanding, sustainable resource management and rational land-use policy.

Founded in 1999 by tropical ecologists Adrian Forsyth and Enrique Ortiz, the organization works in close partnership with the Peruvian nonprofit organization Asociación para la Conservación de la Cuenca Amazónica (ACCA), headquartered in Cuzco, and ACA-Bolivia, headquartered in La Paz. ACA and its sister organizations work by conducting scientific research and establishing partnerships with governments, local communities and other conservation organizations to expand the amount of land protected in the region.

A principal objective of the organization is to develop field research sites ranging from high elevation cloud forest to the lowland Amazonian forest. It is this altitudinal gradient that harbors the greatest known richness of species on the planet. At the ACA field sites university students and researchers are brought to study and observe this diverse ecosystem.

== Programs ==
=== Monitoring of the Andean Amazon Project (MAAP) ===
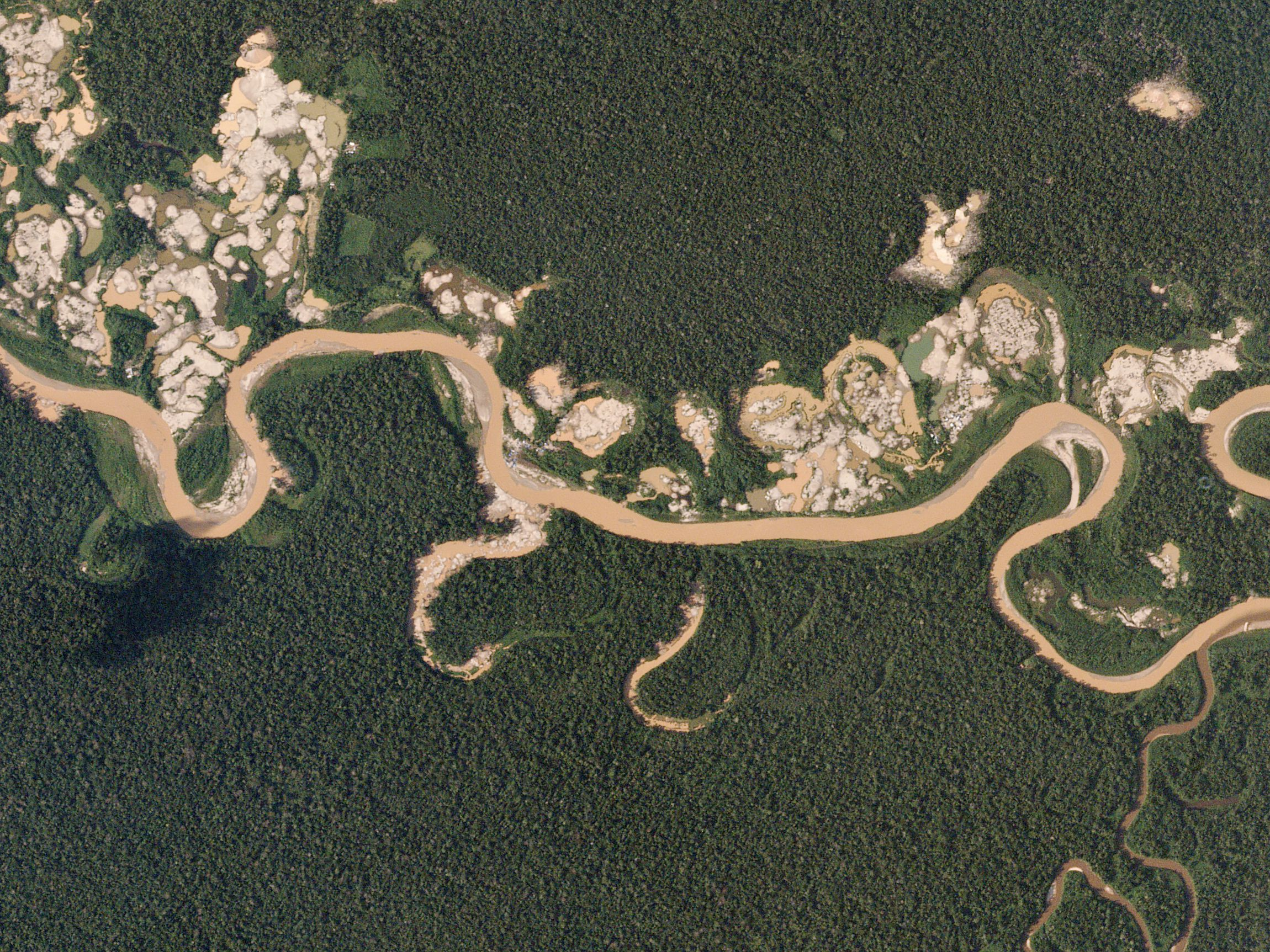
Mining in Peru detected by ACA using Planet imagery

The Monitoring of the Andean Amazon Project (MAAP) uses remotely sensed images of deforestation events in the Andean Amazon to identify potential causes of forest loss. They combine the use of NASA Earth observations and derived forest loss datasets with high-resolution imagery from Planet and DigitalGlobe to identify drivers of deforestation. These case studies are published regularly and have documented a variety of deforestation drivers including hydroelectric dams, fires, cattle ranching, gold mining, oil palm plantations, oil extraction, and agriculture. Results are synthesized to identify patterns in deforestation in the region. MAAP reports have led to improved policies and conservation actions in the Amazon.

=== The Brazil Nut Project ===
ACA works with castanheiros (Brazil nut harvesters or producers) in the southwestern Amazon to both ensure that local and indigenous populations have a sustainable source of income and provide an incentive to conserve native forests. Land areas that contain castanhais, or Brazil nut forests, range from several hundred to several thousand acres in size and are given in concession (territory) to local families for the nut collecting, also known as extraction. This extractive activity represents more than half the yearly income for thousands of families in these areas, and so far has politically justified the protection of the Brazil nut concession areas for extractive purposes. ACA's program offers technical support to castanheiros, helping them map their trees, redesign extractive trails, and earn more by teaching more efficient gathering techniques.

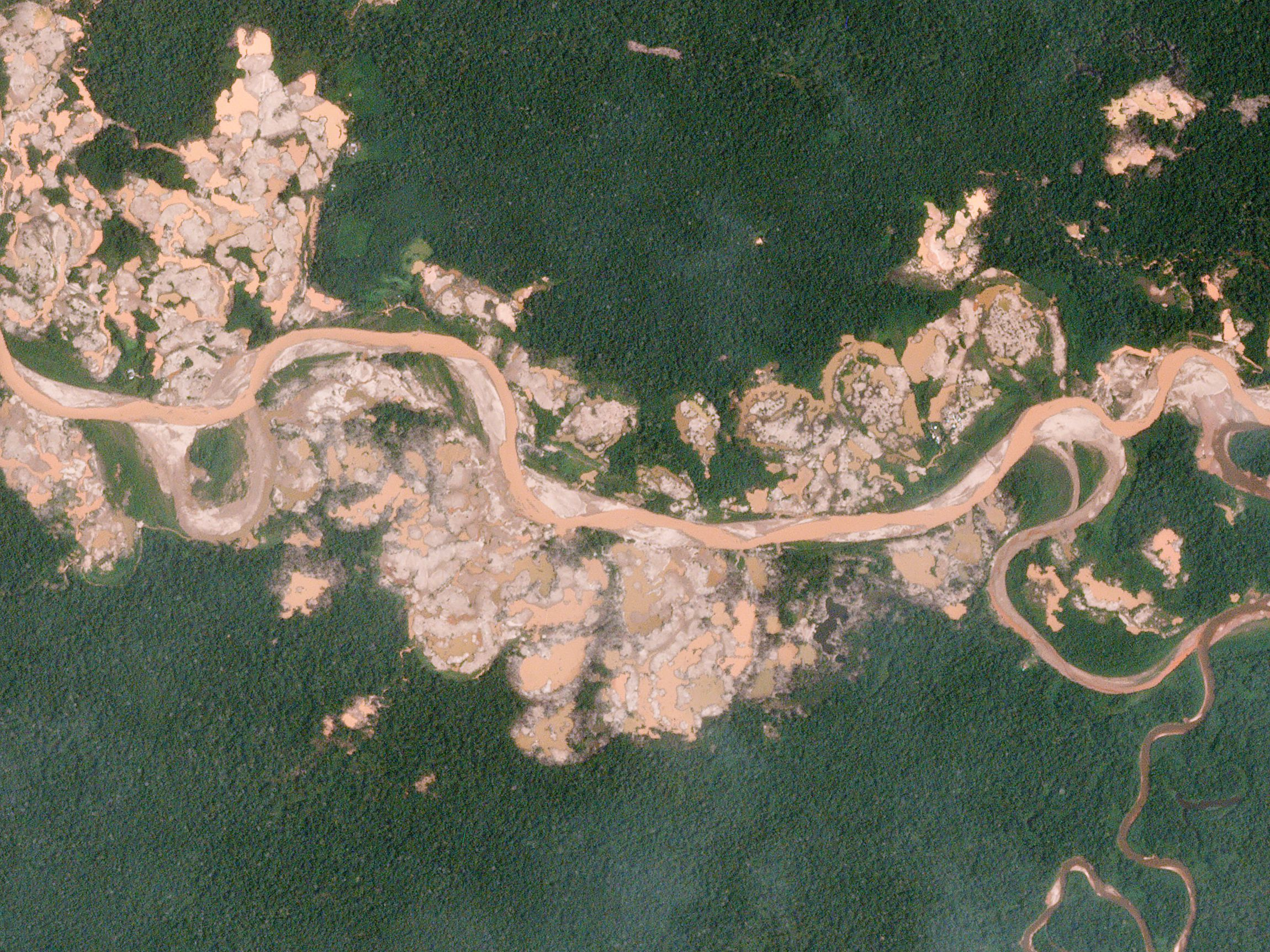
Mining expansion in Peru detected by ACA reported in a MAAP article using Planet imagery

Through its partner in Peru, La Asociación para la Conservación de la Cuenca Amazoncia (ACCA), ACA has helped to increase the number of Brazil nut producers in the department of Madre de Dios, Peru, who have contracts and formal management plans to extract this sustainable resource. In 2006, ACCA assisted 93 small-scale producers gain government approval for Brazil nut extraction in 80,598 acres (326 km^{2}) of forest. The organization worked with these producers to map their stands, develop forest management plans, and win 40-year concession contracts with the Peruvian National Institute for Natural Resources (INRENA). Producers were also trained in sustainable forest management through workshops, meetings, and technical assistance.

=== Los Amigos Conservation Concession ===
In 2000, ACA and its local partner ACCA established the world's first private conservation concession, called Los Amigos ("Friends", in Spanish). The Los Amigos Conservation Concession lies at the mouth of the Los Amigos River and covers approximately 360,000 acres (1,500 km^{2}) of old growth of Amazonian forest in the department of Madre de Dios in southeastern Peru. Here, the organization focuses on sustainable forest management, research activities, conservation education in local schools, and natural resource management training for communities. The Los Amigos Biological Station, commonly known by its Spanish acronym, CICRA (Centro de Investigación y Capacitación Río Los Amigos) sits on a high terrace at the confluence of the Madre de Dios and Los Amigos rivers, contiguous to the Los Amigos Conservation Concession.

In 2005–2007, CICRA was the most active research station in the Amazon basin, hosting an average of 25 researchers and assistants per day. During the same period, it hosted 145 different research projects addressing animal behavior, biogeochemistry, botany, conservation biology, geology, hydrology, zoology, as well as biological inventories of 25 different taxa, ranging from copepods to marsupials. Most research visitors are associated with universities in Peru or abroad, and many receive funding to visit the station through ACA's and ACCA's grant programs. CICRA is also a leading training site for young Amazonian scientists and conservationists. Between 2002 and 2007, the station hosted 19 field courses, ranging from introductory courses on Amazonia to specialized courses on plant identification, ornithology, and arthropod biology.

=== Wayqecha Cloud Forest ===
The Wayqecha (meaning "friend" in Quechua) Research Center covers 1,450 acres (6 km^{2}) of cloud forest habitat, and serves as an ecological buffer for Peru's Manú National Park. At 3,000 masl, the Wayqecha Biological Station sponsors research on cloud forest ecology and climate change and species adaptation. Since 2003, ACA has offered a competitive grant program for Peruvian students and international researchers that are interested in cloud forest science and conservation.

=== Pampas del Heath ===
ACA-Bolivia works to understand the ecology of the Madidi National Park and the last portion of the pampas ecosystem, home of the maned wolf.
