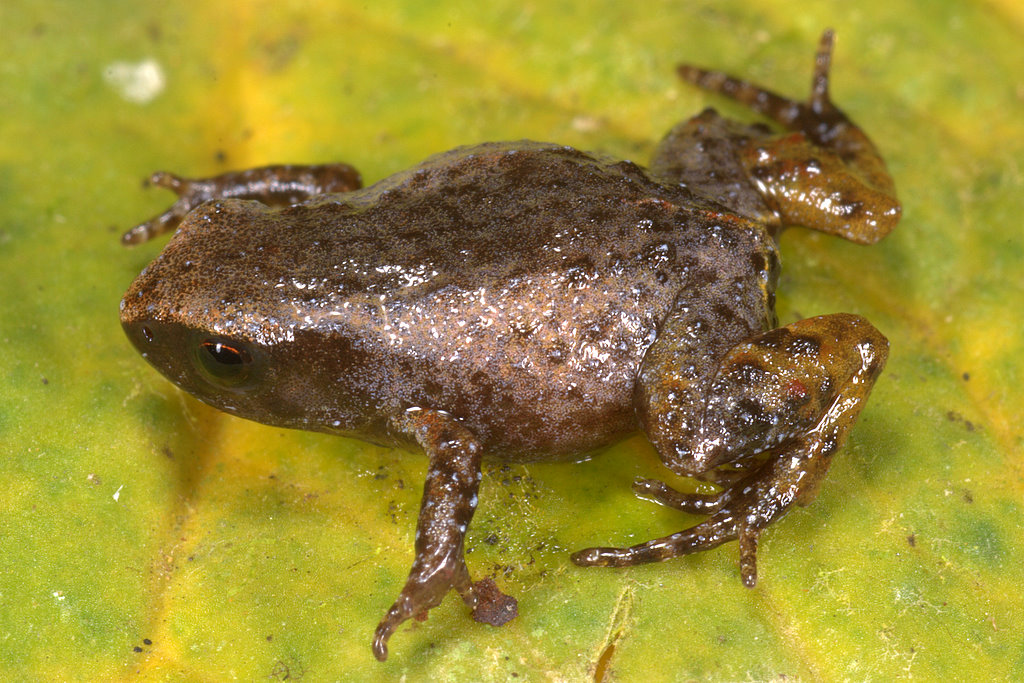
- Noblella pygmaea

Scientific classification
- Kingdom: Animalia
- Phylum: Chordata
- Class: Amphibia
- Order: Anura
- Clade: Brachycephaloidea
- Family: Craugastoridae
- Subfamily: Holoadeninae
- Genus: Noblella; Barbour, 1930

Type species
- Sminthillus peruvianus Noble, 1921

Species
- 13 (see text)

Synonyms
- Psychrophrynella Hedges, Duellman, and Heinicke, 2008

= Noblella =

Genus of amphibians

Noblella is a genus of frogs in the family Strabomantidae. They are found on the eastern slopes of the Andes and in the Amazon Basin in Colombia, Ecuador, Peru, Bolivia, and western Brazil. The name refers to Gladwyn K. Noble, who described the first species.

== Taxonomy ==
The genus Noblella was originally erected to accommodate Sminthillus peruvianus, but subsequently synonymized, first with Eleutherodactylus (1971) and then with Phrynopus (1975). Noblella was resurrected by De la Riva and colleagues in 2008. At the same time, the genus Phyllonastes was placed into synonymy with Noblella. Noblella, following the usurpation of Phyllonastes, was still polyphyletic, and Phyllonastes was resurrected with Psychrophrynella becoming synonymous with Noblella, following Reyes-Puig et al., (2021) and Portik et al., (2023).

== Description ==
Species of the genus Noblella are small frogs measuring up to 22 mm (0.87 in) in snout–vent length. Head is no wider than the body. Tympanic membrane is differentiated except in Noblella duellmani. Dorsum is pustulate or shagreen. Venter is smooth.

== Species ==
The following species are recognised in the genus Noblella:

- Noblella bagrecito (Lynch, 1986)
- Noblella carrascoicola (De la Riva and Köhler, 1998)
- Noblella chirihampatu (Catenazzi and Ttito, 2016)
- Noblella duellmani (Lehr, Aguilar, and Lundberg, 2004)
- Noblella glauca (Catenazzi and Ttito, 2018)
- Noblella losamigos Santa Cruz, von May, Catenazzi, Whitcher, López Tejeda, and Rabosky, 2019
- Noblella madreselva Catenazzi, Uscapi and von May, 2015
- Noblella peruviana (Noble, 1921)
- Noblella pygmaea Lehr and Catenazzi, 2009
- Noblella ritarasquinae (Köhler, 2000)
- Noblella thiuni Catenazzi and Ttito, 2019
- Noblella usurpator (De la Riva, Chaparro, and Padial, 2008)
- Noblella vilcabambensis (Condori, Acevedo-Rincón, Mamani, Delgado C., and Chaparro, 2020)
