= Matthew Paul Heinicke =

American herpetologist (born 1980)

- Born: 4 November 1980
- Education: University of Minnesota; Pennsylvania State University
- Known for: Phylogeny of Terrarana frogs and geckos
- Scientific career
- Fields: Herpetology
- Workplaces: University of Michigan–Dearborn

Matthew Paul "Matt" Heinicke (born 4 November 1980) is an American herpetologist. His research focuses on frogs, particularly the clade Terrarana, and on geckos (Gekkota). He is an assistant professor in the Department of Natural Sciences at the University of Michigan–Dearborn.

== Biography ==
Heinicke grew up in Saint Paul, Minnesota. Numerous visits to museums, zoos, libraries, and state and national parks during his youth fostered his interest in nature. In 2001, he began studying biology at the University of Minnesota, where he conducted research on parasitoid wasp ecology in an entomology laboratory and assisted with studies on amphibian morphology. He earned a Bachelor of Science degree summa cum laude in 2003.

In 2009, Heinicke received his Ph.D. from Pennsylvania State University. His doctoral dissertation, titled A Molecular Phylogenetic Perspective on the Evolutionary History of Terraranan Frogs, a Vertebrate Mega-radiation, examined the evolutionary history and diversification of terraranan frogs. During his graduate studies, he received several fellowships and awards, including the University Graduate Fellowship at Penn State (2004–2005), multiple Braddock Fellowships from the Eberly College of Science (2004, 2005, 2007, 2008, 2009), and the Penn State Alumni Association Dissertation Award in 2009.

Heinicke’s primary research interests include geckos and the species-rich frog clade Terrarana. Terraranans are New World frogs that undergo direct development on land without a free-living tadpole stage. The clade was established in 2008 by Hedges, Duellman, and Heinicke. His work involves the reconstruction and analysis of phylogenies and addresses a wide range of evolutionary topics, including biogeography, speciation, morphological evolution, and taxonomy. His research methods include field sampling, examination of museum specimens, laboratory-based genetic and morphological analyses, and computational phylogenetic methods.

During his postdoctoral research at Villanova University in Villanova, Pennsylvania, Heinicke focused on geckos. His studies combined molecular phylogenetics with evolutionary and biogeographic analyses to investigate patterns of divergence and morphological evolution in several species-rich African, Asian, and Australian gecko groups.

In 2011, Heinicke, together with Aaron M. Bauer and collaborators, described two gecko species from Namibia: Pachydactylus etultra and Pachydactylus maraisi.

In 2024, he was part of the team that described Electroscincus zedi, currently the oldest known fossil skink species.
