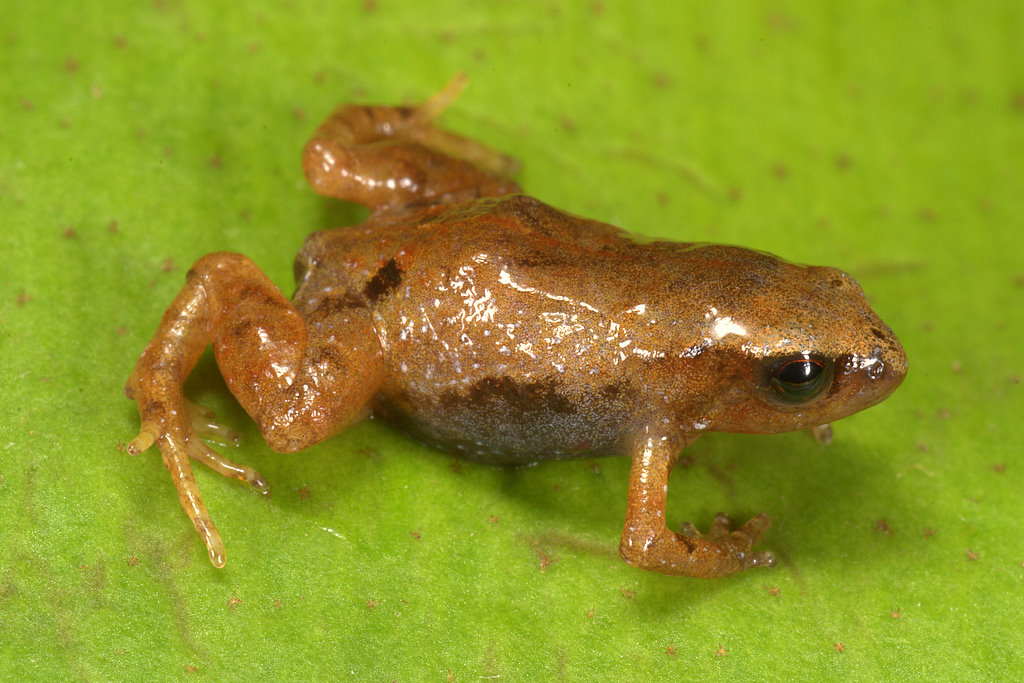
- Noblella pygmaea

Scientific classification
- Kingdom: Animalia
- Phylum: Chordata
- Class: Amphibia
- Order: Anura
- Clade: Brachycephaloidea
- Family: Strabomantidae; Hedges, Duellman & Heinicke, 2008

= Strabomantidae =

Family of amphibians

The Strabomantidae, sometimes called cloud forest landfrogs, are a family of frogs native to South America. These frogs lack a free-living larval stage and hatch directly into miniature "froglets". This family includes Pristimantis, the most speciose genus of any vertebrate. Based on molecular dating, the Holoadeninae in particular appears to have originated in the Eocene. The Oligocene-Miocene transition was also found to be important to their biogeographical history. However, the lack of Holoadeninae fossils and limited nucleotide data ambiguates the results, by the authors' admission.

== Systematics ==
The following subfamilies and genera are in the family Strabomantidae.

- Holoadeninae
  - Bahius Dubois, Ohler, and Pyron, 2021
  - Barycholos Heyer, 1969
  - Bryophryne Hedges, Duellman, and Heinicke, 2008
  - Euparkerella Griffiths, 1959
  - Holoaden Miranda-Ribeiro, 1920
  - Microkayla De la Riva, Chaparro, Castroviejo-Fisher, and Padial, 2017
  - Noblella Barbour, 1930
  - Phyllonastes Heyer, 1977
  - Psychrophrynella Hedges, Duellman, and Heinicke, 2008
  - Qosqophryne Catenazzi, Mamani, Lehr, and von May 2020
  - Urkuphryne Ortega et al., 2025
- Hypodactylinae
  - Niceforonia Goin and Cochran, 1963
- Pristimantinae
  - Lynchius Hedges, Duellman, and Heinicke, 2008
  - Oreobates Jiménez de la Espada, 1872
  - Phrynopus Peters, 1873
  - Pristimantis Jiménez de la Espada, 1870
  - Serranobatrachus Arroyo, Targino, Rueda-Solano, Daza-R., and Grant, 2022
  - Tachiramantis Heinicke, Barrio-Amorós, and Hedges, 2015
  - Yunganastes Padial, Castroviejo-Fisher, Köhler, Domic, and De la Riva, 2007
- Strabomantinae
  - Strabomantis Peters, 1863
