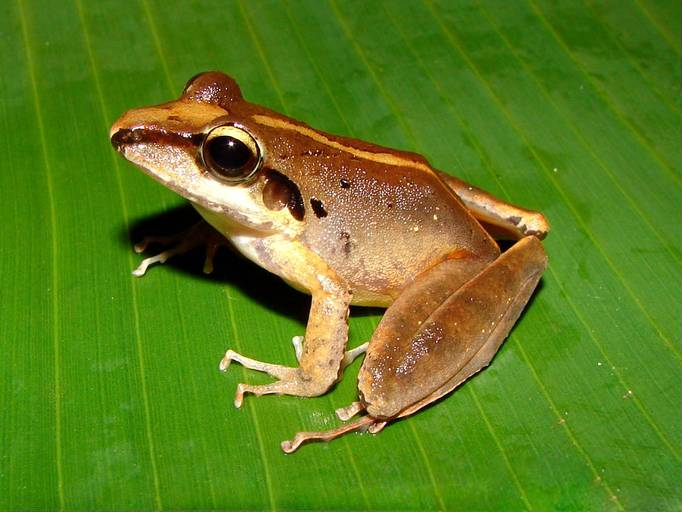
- Craugastor longirostris

Scientific classification
- Kingdom: Animalia
- Phylum: Chordata
- Class: Amphibia
- Order: Anura
- Clade: Brachycephaloidea
- Family: Craugastoridae; Hedges, Duellman, and Heinicke, 2008

Subfamilies
- Craugastorinae; Holoadeninae; Hypodactylinae; Pristimantinae; Strabomantinae

= Craugastoridae =

Family of amphibians

Craugastoridae, commonly known as fleshbelly frogs, is a family of New World direct-developing frogs. As delineated here, following the Amphibian Species of the World, it contains 973 species. They are found from the southern United States southwards to Central and South America.

== Life history ==
With the possible exception of Craugastor laticeps that may be ovoviviparous, craugastorid frogs have direct development: no free-living tadpole stage is known; instead, eggs develop directly into small froglets.

== Taxonomy ==
The family Craugastoridae was created by Stephen Blair Hedges, William Edward Duellman and Matthew P. Heinicke in 2008 for the genera Craugastor and Haddadus. Since then the taxonomy of these frogs has been unsettled and their relationship to other Brachycephaloid frogs has undergone several revisions. Some authors retain the small family, while others treat it as subfamily in a broader Craugastoridae, with the addition of taxa otherwise placed in family Strabomantidae. As of July 2026, the Amphibian Species of the World recognises a broader Craugastoridae with five subfamilies, while AmphibiaWeb recognised a narrow Craugastoridae and places the other taxa in four subfamilies within Strabomantidae.

=== Genera ===
According to Amphibian Species of the World, the following subfamilies and genera are in the family Craugastoridae. AmphibiaWeb restrict the Craugastoridae to the Craugastorinae of ASW, so only include the three genera.

- Craugastorinae (131 species)
  - Craugastor Cope, 1862 (121 species)
  - Haddadus Hedges, Duellman, and Heinicke, 2008 (3 species)
  - Tachiramantis Heinicke, Barrio-Amorós, and Hedges, 2015 (7 species)
- Holoadeninae (81 species)
  - Bahius Dubois, Ohler, and Pyron, 2021 (1 species)
  - Barycholos Heyer, 1969 (2 species)
  - Bryophryne Hedges, Duellman, and Heinicke, 2008 (11 species)
  - Euparkerella Griffiths, 1959 (5 species)
  - Holoaden Miranda-Ribeiro, 1920 (4 species)
  - Microkayla De la Riva, Chaparro, Castroviejo-Fisher, and Padial, 2017 (25 species)
  - Noblella Barbour, 1930 (13 species)
  - Phyllonastes Heyer, 1977 (16 species)
  - Qosqophryne Catenazzi, Mamani, Lehr, and von May 2020 (3 species)
  - Urkuphryne Ortega et al., 2025 (1 species)
- Hypodactylinae (18 species)
  - Niceforonia Goin and Cochran, 1963 (18 species)
- Pristimantinae (727 species)
  - Lynchius Hedges, Duellman, and Heinicke, 2008 (8 species)
  - Oreobates Jiménez de la Espada, 1872 (31 species)
  - Phrynopus Peters, 1873 (39 species)
  - Pristimantis Jiménez de la Espada, 1870 (637 species)
  - Serranobatrachus Arroyo, Targino, Rueda-Solano, Daza-R., and Grant, 2022 (7 species)
  - Yunganastes Padial, Castroviejo-Fisher, Köhler, Domic, and De la Riva, 2007 (5 species)
- Strabomantinae (16 species)
  - Strabomantis Peters, 1863 (16 species)

=== Taxa formerly in Craugastoridae ===
The following two taxa were formerly placed in Craugastoridae, but are now incerta sedis within the superfamily Brachycephaloidea, awaiting more data to resolve their position:

- Atopophrynus Lynch and Ruiz-Carranza, 1982 (monotypic)
- Dischidodactylus Lynch, 1979 (2 species)
- Geobatrachus Ruthven, 1915 (monotypic)
