= List of vulnerable amphibians =

- Extinct in the wild (EW): 2 species
- Critically endangered (CR): 825 species
- Endangered (EN): 1,291 species
- Vulnerable (VU): 815 species
- Near threatened (NT): 453 species
- Least concern (LC): 3,733 species
- Data deficient (DD): 896 species
Amphibian species (IUCN, 2025-2)
- 8052 extant species have been evaluated
- 7156 of those are fully assessed (Note: excludes data deficient evaluations.)
- 4186 are not threatened at present (Note: NT and LC.)
- 2931 to 3827 are threatened (Note: Threatened comprises CR, EN and VU. Upper estimate additionally includes DD.)
- 35 to 148 are extinct or extinct in the wild:
  - 37 extinct (EX) species (Note: Chart omits extinct (EX) species)
  - 2 extinct in the wild (EW)

Vulnerable (VU) species are considered to be facing a high risk of extinction in the wild.

As of December 2025, the International Union for Conservation of Nature (IUCN) listed 814 vulnerable amphibian species. Of all evaluated amphibian species, 10.1% are listed as vulnerable.

For a species to be assessed as vulnerable to extinction the best available evidence must meet quantitative criteria set by the IUCN designed to reflect "a high risk of extinction in the wild". Endangered and critically endangered species also meet the quantitative criteria of vulnerable species, and are listed separately. See: List of endangered amphibians, List of critically endangered amphibians. Vulnerable, endangered and critically endangered species are collectively referred to as threatened species by the IUCN.

Additionally 896 amphibian species (11.1% of those evaluated) are listed as data deficient, meaning there is insufficient information for a full assessment of conservation status. As these species typically have small distributions and/or populations, they are intrinsically likely to be threatened, according to the IUCN. While the category of data deficient indicates that no assessment of extinction risk has been made for the taxa, the IUCN notes that it may be appropriate to give them "the same degree of attention as threatened taxa, at least until their status can be assessed".

This is a complete list of vulnerable amphibian species evaluated by the IUCN, last substantially updated December 2021.

== Caudata ==
Salamanders

=== Cryptobranchidae ===
Giant salamanders

- Japanese giant salamander (Andrias japonicus)
- Hellbender (Cryptobranchus alleganiensis)

=== Hynobiidae ===
Asiatic salamanders

- Chiala mountain salamander (Batrachuperus karlschmidti)
- Western Chinese mountain salamander (Batrachuperus pinchonii)
- Alpine stream salamander (Batrachuperus tibetanus)
- Dunn's oriental salamander (Hynobius dunni)
- Japanese rift salamander (Hynobius fossigenus)
- Stejneger's oriental salamander (Hynobius ikioi)
- Iyoshima salamander (Hynobius kuishiensis)
- Southern Korean salamander (Hynobius notialis)
- Chikushi-buchi-sanshou-uwo (Hynobius oyamai)
- Cheju salamander (Hynobius quelpaertensis)
- Chugoku-buchi-sanshou-uwo (Hynobius sematonotos)
- Tokyo salamander (Hynobius tokyoensis)
- Highland salamander (Hynobius utsunomiyaorum)
- Yamato salamander (Hynobius vandenburghi)
- Tsinpa salamander (Liua tsinpaensis)
- Shikoku clawed salamander (Onychodactylus kinneburi)
- Shangcheng stout salamander (Pachyhynobiud shangchengensis)
- Persian mountain salamander (Paradactylodon persicus)
- Yellow-spotted salamander (Pseudohynobius flavomaculatus)

=== Sirenidae ===
Sirens

- Reticulated siren (Siren reticulata)

=== Salamandridae ===
True salamanders and newts

- Cynops ensicauda
- Anderson's crocodile newt (Echinotriton andersoni)
- Cyan newt (Hypselotriton cyanurus)
- Chuxiong fire-bellied newt (Hypselotriton yunnanensis)
- Kosswig's smooth newt (Lissotriton kosswigi)
- Karpathos salamander (Lyciasalamandra helverseni)
- Lake Urmia newt (Neurergus crocatus)
- Kordestan mountain newt (Neurergus derjugini)
- Luristan newt (Neurergus kaiseri)
- Black-spotted newt (Notophthalmus meridionalis)
- Fei's stout newt (Pachytriton feii)
- Paramesotriton aurantius
- Wanggao warty newt (Paramesotriton fuzhongensis)
- Guangxi warty newt (Paramesotriton guanxiensis)
- Longli warty newt (Paramesotriton longliensis)
- Paramesotriton qixilingensis
- North African fire salamander (Salamandra algira)
- Common fire salamander (Salamandra salamandra)
- Redbelly newt (Taricha rivularis)
- Italian crested newt (Triturus carnifex)
- Macedonian crested newt (Triturus macedonicus)
- Marbled newt (Triturus marmoratus)
- Sangzhi knobby newt (Tylototriton broadoridgus)
- Himalayan salamander (Tylototriton himalayanus)
- Red-tailed knobby newt (Tylototriton kweichowensis)
- Laos knobby newt (Tylototriton notialis)
- Panha's knobby newt (Tylototriton panhai)
- Emperor newt (Tylototriton shanjing)
- Tylototriton shanorum
- Taliang knobby newt (Tylototriton taliangensis)
- Vietnamese crocodile newt (Tylototriton vietnamensis)
- Wenxian knobby newt (Tylototriton wenxianensis)
- Tylototriton ziegleri

=== Ambystomatidae ===
Mole salamanders

- California tiger salamander (Ambystoma californiense)

=== Proteidae ===
Olm, waterdogs

- Alabama waterdog (Necturus alabamensis)
- Olm (Proteus anguinus)

=== Plethodontidae ===
Lungless salamanders

- Kern Canyon slender salamander (Batrachoseps simatus)
- Tehachapi slender salamander (Batrachoseps stebbinsi)
- Oregon slender salamander (Batrachoseps wrighti)
- Hotel Zaracay salamander (Bolitoglossa chica)
- Quebrada Valverde salamander (Bolitoglossa diminuta)
- Rio Quiri salamander (Bolitoglossa gracilis)
- Guaramacal salamander (Bolitoglossa guaramacalensis)
- Bolitoglossa insularis
- Camron climbing salamander (Bolitoglossa lignicolor)
- Finca Chibigui salamander (Bolitoglossa medemi)
- Bolitoglossa mombachoensis
- Müller's mushroomtongue salamander (Bolitoglossa mulleri)
- Tapantí giant salamander (Bolitoglossa obscura)
- Culata mushroomtongue salamander (Bolitoglossa orestes)
- Amazon climbing salamander (Bolitoglossa palmata)
- Bolitoglossa pesrubra
- Longnose mushroomtongue salamander (Bolitoglossa rostrata)
- Silverstone's salamander (Bolitoglossa silverstonei)
- Northwestern climbing salamander (Bolitoglossa sima)
- Shadowy web-footed salamander (Bolitoglossa sombra)
- Chignahuapan splayfoot salamander (Chiropterotriton orculus)
- Longnose bromeliad salamander (Dendrotriton megarhinus)
- Dendrotriton sanctibarbarus
- Xolocalca bromeliad salamander (Dendrotriton xolocalcae)
- Salado Springs salamander (Eurycea chisholmensis)
- Junaluska salamander (Eurycea junaluska)
- Cascade Caverns salamander (Eurycea latitans)
- San Marcos salamander (Eurycea nana)
- Texas salamander (Eurycea neotenes)
- Texas blind salamander (Eurycea rathbuni)
- Barton Springs salamander (Eurycea sosorum)
- Comal blind salamander (Eurycea tridentifera)
- Georgia blind salamander (Eurycea wallacei)
- Austin blind salamander (Eurycea waterlooensis)
- Tennessee cave salamander (Gyrinophilus palleucus)
- Limestone salamander (Hydromantes brunus)
- Shasta salamander (Hydromantes shastae)
- Bell's false brook salamander (Isthmura bellii)
- Oaxacan false brook salamander (Isthmura boneti)
- Monteverde moss salamander (Nototriton gamezi)
- Nototriton guanacaste
- Nototriton saslaya
- Nototriton tapanti
- Limon worm salamander (Oedipina alfaroi)
- Townsend's salamander (Parvimolge townsendi)
- Blue Ridge gray-cheeked salamander (Plethodon amplus)
- Scott Bar salamander (Plethodon asupak)
- Cheoah bald salamander (Plethodon cheoah)
- Fourche Mountain salamander (Plethodon fourchensis)
- Peaks of Otter salamander (Plethodon hubrichti)
- South Mountain gray-cheeked salamander (Plethodon meridianus)
- Pigeon Mountain salamander (Plethodon petraeus)
- Shenandoah salamander (Plethodon shenandoah)
- Big Levels salamander (Plethodon sherando)
- Red-legged salamander (Plethodon shermani)
- Weller's salamander (Plethodon welleri)
- Leprous false brook salamander (Pseudoeurycea leprosa)
- Pseudoeurycea mixteca
- Royal false brook salamander (Pseudoeurycea rex)
- Monte Albo cave salamander (Speleomantes flavus)
- Brown cave salamander (Speleomantes genei)
- Speleomantes sarrabusensis
- Macdougall's pigmy salamander (Thorius macdougalli)

== Anura ==
Frogs

=== Leiopelmatidae ===
New Zealand primitive frogs

- Hamilton's frog (Leiopelma hamiltoni)
- Maud Island frog (Leiopelma pakeka)

=== Bombinatoridae ===
Flat-headed frogs, fire-bellied toads

- Large-spined bell toad (Bombina fortinuptialis)
- Lichuan bell toad (Bombina lichuanensis)

=== Pipidae ===
Clawed frogs, Surinam toads

- Volcano clawed frog (Xenopus amieti)

=== Pelobatidae ===
European spadefoot toads

- Western spadefoot (Pelobates cultripes)

=== Megophryidae ===
Litter frogs

- Bourret's Asian toad (Leptobrachella bourreti)
- Leptobrachella isos
- Lau's leaf litter toad (Leptobrachella laui)
- Guangxi pseudomoustache toad (Leptobrachium guangxiense)
- Leptobrachium hainanense
- Leptobrachium leucops
- Mindoro litter frog (Leptobrachium mangyanorum)
- Palawan litter frog (Leptobrachium tagbanorum)
- Megophrys auralensis
- Naga Hills horned frog (Megophrys awuh)
- Binchuan horned toad (Megophrys binchuanensis)
- Megophrys binlingensis
- Megophrys cheni
- Nankiang horned toad (Megophrys nankiangensis)
- Megophrys synoria
- Oreolalax jingdongensis
- Oreolalax nanjiangensis
- Oreolalax rhodostigmatus
- Scutiger chintingensis
- Scutiger tuberculatus
- Wanglang alpine toad (Scutiger wanglangensis)

=== Brachycephalidae ===
Saddleback toads and allies

- Brachycephalus brunneus
- Brachycephalus coloratus
- Brachycephalus crispus
- Brachycephalus izecksohni
- Brachycephalus leopardus
- Brachycephalus pombali
- Brachycephalus rotenbergae
- Brachycephalus verrucosus
- Ischnocnema bocaina
- Ischnocnema paranaensis
- Ischnocnema parnaso

=== Telmatobiidae ===
Water frogs

- Chili water frog (Telmatobius arequipensis)
- Ancash water frog (Telmatobius carrillae)
- Telmatobius hauthali
- Telmatobius hintoni
- Hocking's water frog (Telmatobius hockingi)
- Telmatobius huayra
- Telmatobius marmoratus
- Telmatobius oxycephalus
- Peru water frog (Telmatobius peruvianus)
- Sanborn's water frog (Telmatobius sanborni)
- La Rioja water frog (Telmatobius schreiteri)
- Telmatobius verrucosus
- Telmatobius yuracare

=== Eleutherodactylidae ===
Robber frogs

- Adelophryne baturitensis
- Diasporus ventrimaculatus
- Patzcuaro peeping frog (Eleutherodactylus angustidigitorum)
- South Island telegraph frog (Eleutherodactylus audanti)
- Northern hammer frog (Eleutherodactylus auriculatoides)
- Puerto Rican rock frog (Eleutherodactylus cooki)
- Oriente coastal frog (Eleutherodactylus etheridgei)
- Eleutherodactylus goini
- Cuban gray frog (Eleutherodactylus greyi)
- Eleutherodactylus guantanamera
- Turquino spiny frog (Eleutherodactylus gundlachi)
- Half-stripe bromeliad frog (Eleutherodactylus heminota)
- Monte Iberia dwarf frog (Eleutherodactylus iberia)
- Oriente treefrog (Eleutherodactylus ionthus)
- Leprus chirping frog (Eleutherodactylus leprus)
- Yellow-striped pygmy eleuth (Eleutherodactylus limbatus)
- Long-footed chirping frog (Eleutherodactylus longipes)
- Eleutherodactylus modestus
- Mona coqui (Eleutherodactylus monensis)
- Eleutherodactylus nivicolimae
- Eleutherodactylus pentasyringos
- Hispaniolan yellow-mottled frog (Eleutherodactylus pictissimus)
- Cuban pineland frog (Eleutherodactylus pinarensis)
- Eleutherodactylus ricordii
- Eleutherodactylus ronaldi
- Dusky chirping frog (Eleutherodactylus rubrimaculatus)
- Red peeping frog (Eleutherodactylus rufescens)
- Oriente mottled frog (Eleutherodactylus simulans)
- Cabo Cruz frog (Eleutherodactylus tonyi)
- Dwarf coqui (Eleutherodactylus unicolor)
- Eleutherodactylus varians
- Eleutherodactylus verrucipes
- Tiburon whistling frog (Eleutherodactylus wetmorei)

=== Rhacophoridae ===
Shrub frogs

- Buergeria oxycephala
- Jinxiu bubble-nest frog (Gracixalus jinxiuensis)
- Quang's tree frog (Gracixalus quangi)
- Kurixalus baliogaster
- Philautus acutirostris
- Philautus acutus
- Philautus amoenus
- Philautus bunitus
- Philautus erythrophthalmus
- Garo Hills bubble-nest frog (Philautus garo)
- Philautus gunungensis
- Philautus ingeri
- Leyte tree frog (Philautus leitensis)
- Philautus longicrus
- Philautus pallidipes
- Mottled tree frog (Philautus poecilius)
- Philautus refugii
- Philautus saueri
- Obscure bush frog (Philautus tectus)
- Philautus umbra
- Philautus worcesteri
- Pseudophilautus hallidayi
- Pseudophilautus sordidus
- Pseudophilautus stictomerus
- Raorchestes bobingeri
- Raorchestes bombayensis
- Günther's bush frog (Raorchestes chalazodes)
- Confusing green bushfrog (Raorchestes chromasynchysi)
- Koadaikanal bush frog (Raorchestes dubois)
- Southern bubble-nest frog (Raorchestes glandulosus)
- Raorchestes graminirupes
- Raorchestes griet
- Rhacophorus annamensis
- Mindanao flying frog (Rhacophorus bimaculatus)
- Spinybottom tree frog (Rhacophorus exechopygus)
- Rhacophorus fasciatus
- Rhacophorus kio
- Rhacophorus monticola
- Anaimalai flying frog (Rhacophorus pseudomalabaricus)
- Rhacophorus spelaeus
- Taipei tree frog (Rhacophorus taipeianus)
- Rhacophorus yinggelingensis
- Bamboo moss frog (Theloderma bambusicolum)
- Assam Indonesian treefrog (Theloderma moloch)
- Theloderma spinosum

=== Aromobatidae ===
Cryptic forest frogs

- Allobates amissibilis
- Allobates bromelicola
- Mera rocket frog (Allobates fratisenescus)
- Allobates pacaas
- Allobates undulatus
- Anomaloglossus ayarzaguenai
- Anomaloglossus murisipanensis
- Perija's nurse frog (Aromobates tokuko)
- Mannophryne cordilleriana
- Bloody Bay poison frog (Mannophryne olmonae)

=== Bufonidae ===
True toads

- Kelaart's toad (Adenomus kelaartii)
- Perret's toad (Amietophrynus perreti)
- Yosemite toad (Anaxyrus canorus)
- Black toad (Anaxyrus exsul)
- Railroad valley toad (Anaxyrus nevadensis)
- North Borneo stream toad (Ansonia fuliginea)
- Ansonia mcgregori
- Ansonia muelleri
- Ansonia penangensis
- Ansonia siamensis
- Ansonia tiomanica
- Ansonia torrentis
- Cayenne stubfoot toad (Atelopus flavescens)
- Central Coast stubfoot toad (Atelopus franciscus)
- Pebas stubfoot toad (Atelopus spumarius)
- Condoto stubfoot toad (Atelopus spurrelli)
- Atelopus pulcher
- Three-coloured harlequin toad (Atelopus tricolor)
- Eichwald's toad (Bufo eichwaldi)
- Cape mountain toad (Capensibufo rosei)
- Beddome's toad (Duttaphrynus beddomii)
- Kempholey toad (Duttaphrynus brevirostris)
- Burmese golden toad (Duttaphrynus crocus)
- Southern Hill toad (Duttaphrynus microtympanum)
- Duttaphrynus scorteccii
- Malabar torrent toad (Ghatophryne ornata)
- Incilius chompipe
- Incilius cycladen
- Incilius macrocristatus
- Incilius tutelarius
- Melanophryniscus alipioi
- Melanophryniscus dorsalis
- Melanophryniscus macrogranulosus
- Melanophryniscus montevidensis
- Melanophryniscus orejasmirandai
- Lönnbergs toad (Mertensophryne lonnbergi)
- Uzungwe toad (Mertensophryne uzunguensis)
- Metaphryniscus sosai
- Nannophryne corynetes
- Oreophrynella cryptica
- Oreophrynella huberi
- Oreophrynella macconnelli
- Oreophrynella nigra
- Oreophrynella quelchii
- Oreophrynella vasquezi
- Oreophrynella weiassipuensis
- Guacamayo plump toad (Osornophryne guacamayo)
- Herveo plump toad (Osornophryne percrassa)
- Osornophryne sumacoensis
- Cannatella's plump toad (Osornophryne talipes)
- Parapelophryne scalpta
- White-striped flathead toad (Pelophryne albotaeniata)
- Pelophryne guentheri
- Pelophryne lighti
- Pelophryne misera
- Pelophryne rhopophilia
- Cuban small-eared toad (Peltophryne empusa)
- Southern crested toad (Peltophryne guentheri)
- Cuban high-crested toad (Peltophryne gundlachi)
- Cuban spotted toad (Peltophryne taladai)
- Atacama toad (Rhinella atacamensis)
- Rhinella justinianoi
- Santa Rita beaked toad (Rhinella macrorhina)
- Rhinella manu
- Laguna toad (Rhinella nesiotes)
- Rhinella quechua
- Rhinella rubropunctata
- Rhinella rumbolli
- Falcon crested toad (Rhinella sclerocephala)
- Urungu toad (Sclerophrys urunguensis)
- Villiers' toad (Sclerophrys villiersi)
- Cameroon wolterstorff toad (Wolterstorffina parvipalmata)

=== Craugastoridae ===
Fleshbelly frogs

- Rivulet rainfrog (Craugastor amniscola)
- Craugastor aurilegulus
- Craugastor brocchi
- Craugastor charadra
- Craugastor chingopetaca
- Craugastor palenque
- Monstrous rainfrog (Craugastor pelorus)
- Craugastor rivulus
- Snouted robber frog (Craugastor rostralis)
- Stuart's robber frog (Craugastor stuarti)
- Savage's robber frog (Craugastor uno)
- Xucaneb robber frog (Craugastor xucanebi)
- Haddadus aramunha

=== Strabomantidae ===
Cloud forest groundfrogs

- Microkayla chaupi
- Microkayla colla
- Microkayla condoriri
- Microkayla huayna
- Microkayla iatamasi
- Microkayla illampu
- Microkayla katantika
- Microkayla melanocheira
- Wettstein's Andes frog (Microkayla wettsteini)
- Putumayo robber frog (Niceforonia dolops)
- Boqueron robber frog (Nicefornia latens)
- Niceforonia nana
- Oreobates amarakaeri
- Oreobates berdemenos
- Oreobates choristolemma
- Lesser Pilaló robber frog (Pristimantis actites)
- Afrox's robber frog (Pristimantis afrox)
- Pristimantis albertus
- Santander robber frog (Pristimantis anolirex)
- Pinocchio rainfrog (Pristimantis appendiculatus)
- Pristimantis ardyae
- Santiago robber frog (Pristimantis atratus)
- Yanayacu robber frog (Pristimantis bicantus)
- Two-colored robber frog (Pristimantis bicolor)
- Caracas robber frog (Pristimantis bicumulus)
- Guaramacal robber frog (Pristimantis boconoensis)
- Cajanuma rain frog (Pristimantis cajanuma)
- San Antonio robber frog (Pristimantis calcaratus)
- Spurred robber frog (Pristimantis calcarulatus)
- Pristimantis celator
- Wild's robber frog (Pristimantis ceuthospilus)
- Charlottesville robber frog (Pristimantis charlottevillensis)
- Churuwia's rainfrog (Pristimantis churuwiai)
- Cisnero's robber frog (Pristimantis cisnerosi)
- Pristimantis colomai
- Pristimantis colonensis
- Spring robber frog (Pristimantis crenunguis)
- San Vicente robber frog (Pristimantis cryophilius)
- Serna's robber frog (Pristimantis dorsopictus)
- Pristimantis duende
- Elegant robber frog (Pristimantis elegans)
- Pristimantis eremitus
- Moss robber frog (Pristimantis eriphus)
- Ernest's robber frog (Pristimantis ernesti)
- Rio Piuntza robber frog (Pristimantis exoristus)
- Pejia's striped robber frog (Pristimantis fasciatus)
- Pristimantis fallax
- Los Aranguren páramo frog (Pristimantis flabellidiscus)
- Yapitya robber frog (Pristimantis ganonotus)
- Pristimantis ginesi
- Pristimantis gladiator
- Pichinde robber frog (Pristimantis gracilis)
- Dwarf robber frog (Pristimantis hectes)
- Jabon paramo frog (Pristimantis jabonensis)
- Pristimantis johannesdei
- Pristimantis juanchoi
- Pristimantis lancinii
- Burrowes' robber frog (Pristimantis laticlavius)
- Pristimantis lemur
- Pristimantis leopardus
- Lutz's rain frog (Pristimantis lutzae)
- Spotted robber frog (Pristimantis maculosus)
- Bogotacito robber frog (Pristimantis merostictus)
- Urbina robber frog (Pristimantis modipeplus)
- Pristimantis muchimuk
- Multicolored rain frog (Pristimantis multicolor)
- Rio Faisanes robber frog (Pristimantis muricatus)
- Myers' robber frog (Pristimantis myersi)
- Pristimantis museosus
- Charcoal robber frog (Pristimantis nigrogriseus)
- Bolivar robber frog (Pristimantis orcesi)
- Pichincha robber frog (Pristimantis parvillus)
- Pristimantis pedimontanus
- Tapir robber frog (Pristimantis pinchaque)
- Pristimantis platychilus
- Pristimantis polychrus
- Sapote robber frog (Pristimantis proserpens)
- Yavi rainfrog (Pristimantis pruinatus)
- Fern-loving treefrog (Pristimantis pteridophilus)
- Pure Coffee's robber frog (Pristimantis puruscafeum)
- Zapadores robber frog (Pristimantis quinquagesimus)
- Las Hermosas robber frog (Pristimantis racemus)
- Pristimantis rhigophilus
- Pristimantis rivasi
- Roman's cutin (Pristimantis romanorum)
- Rosado's robber frog (Pristimantis rosadoi)
- Pristimantis ruedai
- Pristimantis rufioculis
- Sacharuna robber frog (Pristimantis sacharuna)
- Schulte's robber frog (Pristimantis schultei)
- Ricuarte robber frog (Pristimantis scolodiscus)
- Pristimantis silverstonei
- Paramo Andes frog (Pristimantis simonsii)
- Reserve robber frog (Pristimantis siopelus)
- Sobetes robber frog (Pristimantis sobetes)
- Pristimantis suetus
- Channel robber frog (Pristimantis sulculus)
- El Carmelo robber frog (Pristimantis supernatis)
- San Adolfo robber frog (Pristimantis tamsitti)
- Hotel robber frog (Pristimantis tenebrionis)
- Pristimantis tinajillas
- Tinguichaca striped rain frog (Pristimantis tinguichaca)
- Pristimantis truebae
- Pristimantis uisae
- Vertrbral robber frog (Pristimantis vertebralis)
- Pristimantis xeniolum
- Pristimantis xestus
- Yuruaní rainfrog (Pristimantis yuruaniensis)
- Yusitz's robber frog (Pristimantis yusitzi)
- Antapipes robber frog (Strabomantis anatipes)
- Inger's robber frog (Strabomantis ingeri)
- Strabomantis necopinus
- Tachiramantis douglasi
- Lasso-Alcala's rain frog (Tachiramantis lassoalcalai)
- Cochabamba robber frog (Yunganastes fraudator)
- Yunganastes pluvicanorus

=== Centrolenidae ===
Glass frogs

- El Tovar glass frog (Celsiella revocata)
- Warty glass frog (Centrolene heloderma)
- Centrolene quindianum
- Sabin's glass frog (Centrolene sabini)
- Duida cochran frog (Cochranella duidaeana)
- Cochranella litoralis
- Cochranella riveroi
- Cochranella xanthocheridia
- Eastern glass frog (Hyalinobatrachium orientale)
- Magdalena giant glass frog (Ikakogi tayrona)
- Nymphargus garciae
- Rio Calima cochran frog (Nymphargus prasinus)
- Nymphargus rosada
- Ruiz's cochran frog (Nymphargus ruizi)
- Western cochran frog (Rulyrana adiazeta)
- Sachatamia punctulata
- Vitreorana antisthenesi
- Venezuela cochran frog (Vitreorana helenae)
- Lages glass frog (Vitreorana parvula)

=== Batrachylidae ===
South American wood frogs

- Rio Negro frog (Atelognathus nitoi)
- Laguna Raimunda frog (Atelognathus reverberii)
- Portezuelo frog (Atelognathus salai)
- Las Bayas frog (Atelognathus solitarius)
- Batrachyla fitzroya

=== Arthroleptidae ===
Screeching frogs

- Arthroleptis nguruensis
- Victoria night frog (Astylosternus diadematus)
- Fopouanga night frog (Astylosternus fallax)
- Cameroon range night frog (Astylosternus rheophilus)
- Amiet's long-fingered frog (Cardioglossa melanogaster)
- Acha Tugi long-fingered frog (Cardioglossa schioetzi)
- Whitebelly egg frog (Leptodactylodon albiventris)
- Mountain egg frog (Leptodactylodon bicolor)
- Boulenger's egg frog (Leptodactylodon boulengeri)
- Leptodactylodon bueanus
- African egg frog (Leptodactylodon polyacanthus)
- Speckled egg frog (Leptodactylodon ventrimarmoratus)
- Large headed forest treefrog (Leptopelis grandiceps)
- Karissimbi forest tree frog (Leptopelis karissimbensis)
- Palm forest tree frog (Leptopelis palmatus)
- Shoa forest tree frog (Leptopelis ragazzii)
- Grassland forest tree frog (Leptopelis yaldeni)

=== Hemiphractidae ===
Marsupial frogs, horned treefrogs, backpack frogs, and allies

- Boulenger's backpack frog (Cryptobatrachus boulengeri)
- Perijá backpacker frog (Cryptobatrachus remotus)
- Gastrotheca atympana
- Antioqua marsupial frog (Gastrotheca bufona)
- Abra Acanacu marsupial frog (Gastrotheca excubitor)
- El Tambo marsupial frog (Gastrotheca lateonota)
- Rana marsupial lojana (Gastrotheca lojana)
- Papallacta marsupial frog (Gastrotheca orophylax)
- Gastrotheca ovifera
- Gastrotheca pachachacae
- Gastrotheca phelloderma
- Silver marsupial frog (Gastrotheca plumbea)
- Gastrotheca riobambae
- Gastrotheca walkeri
- Ecuador horned treefrog (Hemiphractus bubalus)
- Banded horned treefrog (Hemiphractus fasciatus)
- Stefania ackawaio
- Stefania ayangannae
- Stefania coxi
- Brewer's carrying frog (Stefania breweri)
- Stefania oculosa
- Stefania percristata
- Stefania riveroi

=== Dendrobatidae ===
Poison dart frogs

- Pleasing poison frog (Ameerega bassleri)
- Ameerega pongoensis
- Alto de Buey poison frog (Andinobates altobueyensis)
- Cauca poison frog (Andinobates bombetes)
- Andinobates dorisswansonae
- Andean poison frog (Andinobates opisthomelas)
- Andinobates tolimensis
- Santander poison frog (Andinobates virolinensis)
- Mertens' rocket frog (Colostethus mertensi)
- Thornton's rocket frog (Colostethus thorntoni)
- Phantasmal poison frog (Epipedobates tricolor)
- Bocage's rocket frog (Hyloxalus bocagei)
- Hyloxalus cepedai
- Hyloxalus fascianigrus
- Chimbo rocket frog (Hyloxalus infraguttatus)
- Hyloxalus insulatus
- Toachi rocket frog (Hyloxalus toachi)
- Hellmich's rocket frog (Hyloxalus vergeli)
- Boulenger's rocket frog (Hyloxalus vertebralis)
- Pastaza rocket frog (Leucostethus fugax)
- Granular poison frog (Oophaga granulifera)
- Golfodulcean poison frog (Phyllobates vittatus)
- Blessed poison frog (Ranitomeya benedicta)
- Red-headed poison frog (Ranitomeya fantastica)
- Boquete rocket frog (Silverstoneia nubicola)

=== Mantellidae ===
Mantellid frogs

- Aglyptodactylus laticeps
- Angel's Madagascar frog (Boehmantis microtympanum)
- Boophis andohahela
- Boophis andreonei
- Boophis blommersae
- Nosy Be bright-eyed frog (Boophis brachychir)
- Boophis englaenderi
- Boophis fayi
- Ambohimitombo bright-eyed frog (Boophis majori)
- Tiny bright-eyed frog (Boophis miniatus)
- Boophis popi
- Boophis spinophis
- Boophis ulftunni
- Boophis vittatus
- Gephyromantis ambohitra
- Horned Madagascar frog (Gephyromantis cornutus)
- Gephyromantis enki
- Boettger's grainy frog (Gephyromantis horridus)
- Gephyromantis rivicola
- Gephyromantis runewsweeki
- Gephyromantis salegy
- Gephyromantis schilfi
- Gephyromantis silvanus
- Greater spiny Madagascar frog (Gephyromantis spiniferus)
- Gephyromantis striatus
- Gephyromantis tahotra
- Gephyromantis tandroka
- Guibemantis kathrinae
- White-flanked Malagasy tree frog (Guibemantis tasifotsy)
- Haraldmeier's mantella (Mantella haraldmeieri)
- Madagascan mantella (Mantella madagascariensis)
- Marojejy mantella (Mantella manery)
- Beautiful mantella (Mantella pulchra)
- Mantidactylus delormei
- Mantidactylus noralottae
- Guibe's Madagascar frog (Spinomantis guibei)
- Spinomantis massi
- Spinomantis tavaratra

=== Ceratobatrachidae ===
Wrinkled ground frogs and allies

- Cheesman's wrinkled ground frog (Cornufer cheesmanae)
- Cornufer citrinospilus
- Cornufer desticans
- Tiny sticky-toed frog (Cornufer minutus)
- Baining wrinkled ground frog (Cornufer nexipus)
- Wolf's sticky-toed frog (Cornufer wolfi)
- Xiyang eastern frog (Liurana xizangensis)
- Hazel's wrinkled ground frog (Platymantis hazelae)
- Platymantis montanus
- Platymantis sierramadrensis
- Platymantis taylori

=== Dicroglossidae ===
Fork-tongued frogs

- Northern frog (Ingerana borealis)
- Limnonectes acanthi
- Eastern Mindanao frog (Limnonectes diuatus)
- Limnonectes fragilis
- Limnonectes heinrichi
- Limnonectes liui
- Fanged river frog (Limnonectes macrodon)
- Philippine small-disked frog (Limnonectes parvus)
- Limnonectes toumanoffi
- Giant Visayan frog (Limnonectes visayanus)
- Chilapata rainpool frog (Minervarya chilapata)
- Nannophrys ceylonensis
- Nanorana liui
- Nanorana minica
- Nanorana rostandi
- Small-headed frog (Occidozyga diminutiva)
- Little spiny frog (Quasipaa exilispinosa)
- Quasipaa fasciculispina
- Jiulong spiny frog (Quasipaa jiulongensis)
- Spiny-flanked frog (Quasipaa shini)
- Giant spiny frog (Quasipaa spinosa)

=== Microhylidae ===
Narrow-mouthed frogs

- Mountain climbing frog (Anodonthyla montana)
- Austrochaperina novaebritanniae
- Chiasmocleis alagoana
- Tapping nursery frog (Cophixalus aenigma)
- Cophixalus nubicola
- Black Mountain boulder frog (Cophixalus saxatilis)
- Island giant treefrog (Cophyla occultans)
- Copiula minor
- Ctenophryne barbatula
- Dasypops schirchi
- Gastrophrynoides borneensis
- African banana frog (Hoplophryne uluguruensis)
- Barber's sheep frog (Hypopachus barberi)
- Kalophrynus intermedius
- Kalophrynus minusculus
- Kalophrynus punctatus
- Kalinga narrowmouth toad (Kaloula kalingensis)
- Luzon narrow-mouthed frog (Kaloula rigida)
- Orange black-tubercled Indian microhylid (Melanobatrachus indicus)
- Microhyla orientalis
- Pine narrow-mouth frog (Microhyla pineticola)
- Stejneger's paddy frog (Micryletta steinegeri)
- Oreophryne anulata
- Oreophryne celebensis
- Oreophryne variabilis
- Betsileo digging frog (Plethodontohyla brevipes)
- Rhombophryne mangabensis
- Rhombophryne staffordi
- Scaphiophryne boribory
- Marbled rain frog (Scaphiophryne marmorata)
- Scaphiophryne menabensis
- Uperodon nagaoi
- Uperodon triangularis

=== Ranidae ===
True frogs

- Bamileke plateau frog (Amnirana longipes)
- Assamese cascade frog (Amolops assamensis)
- Amolops jinjiangensis
- Amolops kangtingensis
- Lolokou sucker frog (Amolops loloensis)
- Amolops torrentis
- Amolops tuberodepressus
- Javan torrent frog (Huia masonii)
- Hylarana attigua
- Boulenger's golden-backed frog (Indosylvirana aurantiaca)
- Rio Chipillico frog (Lithobates bwana)
- Chiricahua leopard frog (Lithobates chiricahuensis)
- Guatemala plateau frog (Lithobates macroglossa)
- Big-footed leopard frog (Lithobates megapoda)
- Island leopard frog (Lithobates miadis)
- Florida bog frog (Lithobates okaloosae)
- Sierra Madre frog (Lithobates sierramadrensis)
- Tarahumara frog (Lithobates tarahumarae)
- Rancho Redondo frog (Lithobates vibicarius)
- Meristogenys amoropalamus
- Meristogenys jerboa
- Geminated cascade frog (Odorrana geminata)
- Odorrana hainanensis
- Odorrana jingdongensis
- Junlian odorous frog (Odorrana junlianensis)
- Hainan bamboo-leaf frog (Odorrana nasuta)
- Concave-eared torrent frog (Odorrana tormota)
- Papurana waliesa
- Seoul frog (Pelophylax chosenicus)
- Epirus water frog (Pelophylax epeiroticus)
- Pseudorana weiningensis
- Indian flying frog (Pterorana khare)
- California red-legged frog (Rana draytonii)
- Iberian frog (Rana iberica)
- Italian agile frog (Rana latastei)
- Rana longicrus
- Oregon spotted frog (Rana pretiosa)
- Sanguirana igorota
- Sanguirana tipanan
- Sylvirana spinulosa

=== Myobatrachidae ===
Australian water frogs

- Orange-bellied frog (Anstisia vitellina)
- Pouched frog (Assa darlingtoni)
- Stuttering frog (Mixophyes balbus)
- Giant barred frog (Mixophyes iteratus)
- Martin's toadlet (Uperoleia martini)

=== Phrynobatrachidae ===
Puddle frogs

- Nkongsamba river frog (Phrynobatrachus cricogaster)
- Kinangop river frog (Phrynobatrachus kinangopensis)
- Phrynobatrachus steindachneri
- Central river frog (Phrynobatrachus sulfureogularis)
- Yapo river frog (Phrynobatrachus villiersi)

=== Hylidae ===
Tree frogs and allies

- Blue-sided leaf frog (Agalychnis annae)
- Bokermannohyla lucianae
- Fairy tree frog (Charadrahyla chaneque)
- Oaxacan cloud-forest treefrog (Charadrahyla nephila)
- Porthole tree frog (Charadrahyla taeniopus)
- Kaplan's Garagoa treefrog (Dendropsophus stingi)
- Schmidt's mountain brook frog (Duellmanohyla schmidtorum)
- Costa Rica brook frog (Duellmanohyla uranochroa)
- Heredia treefrog (Ecnomiohyla fimbrimembra)
- Cope's brown treefrog (Ecnomiohyla miliaria)
- Guatemala treefrog (Ecnomiohyla minera)
- Exerodonta juanitae
- Exerodonta melanomma
- Exerodonta pinorum
- Exerodonta xera
- Walker's tree frog (Hyla walkeri)
- Charta treefrog (Hyloscirtus denticulentus)
- Jahn's stream frog (Hyloscirtus jahni)
- Linda's tree frog (Hyloscirtus lindae)
- Merida Andes tree frog (Hyloscirtus platydactylus)
- Papallacta tree frog (Hyloscirtus psarolaimus)
- Simmons' tree frog (Hyloscirtus simmonsi)
- El Pepino tree frog (Hyloscirtus torrenticola)
- Los Bracitos tree frog (Hypsiboas heilprini)
- Myersiohyla aromatica
- Bahia's broad-snout casque-headed tree frog (Nyctimantis arapapa)
- Loud big-eyed tree frog (Nyctimystes avocalis)
- Rueppel's big-eyed tree frog (Nyctimystes rueppelli)
- Jamaican snoring frog (Osteopilus crucialis)
- Hispaniolan yellow tree frog (Osteopilus pulchrilineatus)
- Hispaniolan giant tree frog (Osteopilus vastus)
- Green bromeliad frog (Osteopilus wilderi)
- Alhandra heart-tongued frog (Phyllodytes brevirostris)
- Maracas heart-tongued frog (Phyllodytes tuberculosus)
- Mato Grosso leaf frog (Pithecopus centralis)
- Matuda's spikethumb frog (Plectrohyla matudai)
- Hazel’s tree frog (Plectrohyla hazelae)
- Arcane spikethumb frog (Plectrohyla sagorum)
- Tan-edged treefrog (Sarcohyla cyclada)
- Mourning treefrog (Sarcohyla pentheter)
- Roberts' treefrog (Sarcohyla robertsorum)
- Gorzula's Amazon tree frog (Tepuihyla rimarum)
- Godman's tree frog (Tlalocohyla godmani)
- Xenohyla truncata

=== Pelodryadidae ===
Australian treefrogs

- Cape Melville tree frog (Litoria andiirrmalin)
- Green and golden bell frog (Litoria aurea)
- Beck's tree frog (Litoria becki)
- Davies' tree frog (Litoria daviesae)
- Australian lace-lid (Litoria dayi)
- Freycinet's frog (Litoria freycineti)
- Faro Island tree frog (Litoria lutea)
- Wallum sedge frog (Litoria olongburensis)
- Lined tree frog (Litoria quadrilineata)
- Growling grass frog (Litoria raniformis)
- New England tree frog (Litoria subglandulosa)
- Wissel Lakes tree frog (Litoria wisselensis)

=== Hyperoliidae ===
African reed frogs

- Ivory coast wart frog (Acanthixalus sonjae)
- Ethiopian banana frog (Afrixalus enseticola)
- Afrixalus morerei
- Afrixalus sylvaticus
- Uluguru banana frog (Afrixalus uluguruensis)
- Callixalus pictus
- Bobiri reed frog (Hyperolius bobirensis)
- Dizangue reed frog (Hyperolius bopeleti)
- Hyperolius burgessi
- Hyperolius constellatus
- Yaounde reed frog (Hyperolius endjami)
- Nyanga long reed frog (Hyperolius inyangae)
- Schiotz's reed frog (Hyperolius laurenti)
- Hyperolius minutissimus
- Falls reed frog (Hyperolius polystictus)
- Riggenbach's reed frog (Hyperolius riggenbachi)
- Spiny-throated reed frog (Hyperolius spinigularis)
- Ukami reed frog (Hyperolius torrentis)
- Stream reed frog (Hyperolius viridigulosus)
- Ivory coast running frog (Kassina arboricola)
- Rainforest running frog (Kassina lamottei)
- Morerella cyanophthalma
- Kouni Valley striped frog (Paracassina kounhiensis)

=== Pyxicephalidae ===
Box-headed frogs

- Phofung river frog (Amietia hymenopus)
- Strongylopus kitumbeine
- Chimanimani stream frog (Strongylopus rhodesianus)

=== Limnodynastidae ===
Australian ground frogs

- Sphagnum frog (Philoria sphagnicola)

=== Cycloramphidae ===
Button frogs and allies

- Bandeira button frog (Cycloramphus bandeirensis)
- Cycloramphus faustoi
- Cycloramphus organensis

=== Leptodactylidae ===
Southern frogs

- Crossodactylodes septentrionalis
- Guayaco dwarf frog (Engystomops guayaco)
- Goias white-lipped frog (Leptodactylus tapiti)
- Physalaemus caete
- Marbled four-eyed frog (Pleurodema marmoratum)
- Pseudopaludicola ibisoroca
- Pseudopaludicola restinga
- Rupirana cardosoi

=== Hylodidae ===
Tree toads and allies

- Crossodactylus werneri
- Ornate tree toad (Hylodes ornatus)
- Otavio tree toad (Hylodes otavioi)
- Hylodes sazimai
- Hylodes uai

=== Odontophrynidae ===
Odontophrynid frogs

- Cordoba escuerzo (Odontophrynus achalensis)
- Proceratophrys carranca
- Toad-like ground frog (Proceratophrys cururu)
- Proceratophrys huntingtoni

=== Ceratophryidae ===
Common horned frogs

- Argentine horned frog (Ceratophrys ornata)
- Pacific horned frog (Ceratophrys stolzmanni)

=== Brevicipitidae ===
Rain frogs

- Cape rain frog (Breviceps gibbosus)
- Desert rain frog (Breviceps macrops)
- Snouted forest frog (Probreviceps durirostris)
- Rungwe snouted forest frog (Probreviceps rungwensis)

=== Ceuthomantidae ===
Emerald-barred frogs

- Ceuthomantis aracamuni
- Ceuthomantis smaragdinus

=== Other frog species ===
- Cabreria spiny-chest frog (Alsodes barrioi)
- Mountain spiny-chest frog (Alsodes montanus)
- La Parva spiny-chest frog (Alsodes tumultuosus)
- Betic midwife toad (Alytes dickhilleni)
- Majorcan midwife toad (Alytes muletensis)
- Philippine flat-headed frog (Barbourula busuangensis)
- Helmeted water toad (Calyptocephalella gayi)
- Allen's slippery frog (Conraua alleni)
- Giant slippery frog (Conraua robusta)
- Eupsophus queulensis
- Giant burrowing frog (Heleioporus australiacus)
- Indirana leithii
- Gadgil's torrent frog (Micrixalus gadgili)
- Micrixalus kottigeharensis
- Nilgiri dancing frog (Micrixalus phyllophilus)
- Giant barred frog (Mixophyes iteratus)
- Nyctibatrachus deccanensis
- Bombay night frog (Nyctibatrachus humayuni)
- Nyctibatrachus major
- Efulen water frog (Petropedetes palmipes)
- Darwin's frog (Rhinoderma darwinii)
- Amazonas water frog (Telmatobius atahualpai)
- Pelado Mountains false toad (Telmatobufo australis)
- Thoropa petropolitana
- Boulenger's Indian frog (Walkerana leptodactyla)

== Gymnophiona ==
Caecilians

- Fischer’s African caecilian (Boulengerula fischeri)
- Parker's caecilian (Epicrionops parkeri)
- Ceylon caecilian (Ichthyophis glutinosus)
- Taylor's caecilian (Ichthyophis pseudangularis)

== See also ==
- Lists of IUCN Red List vulnerable species
- List of least concern amphibians
- List of near threatened amphibians
- List of endangered amphibians
- List of critically endangered amphibians
- List of recently extinct amphibians
- List of data deficient amphibians
