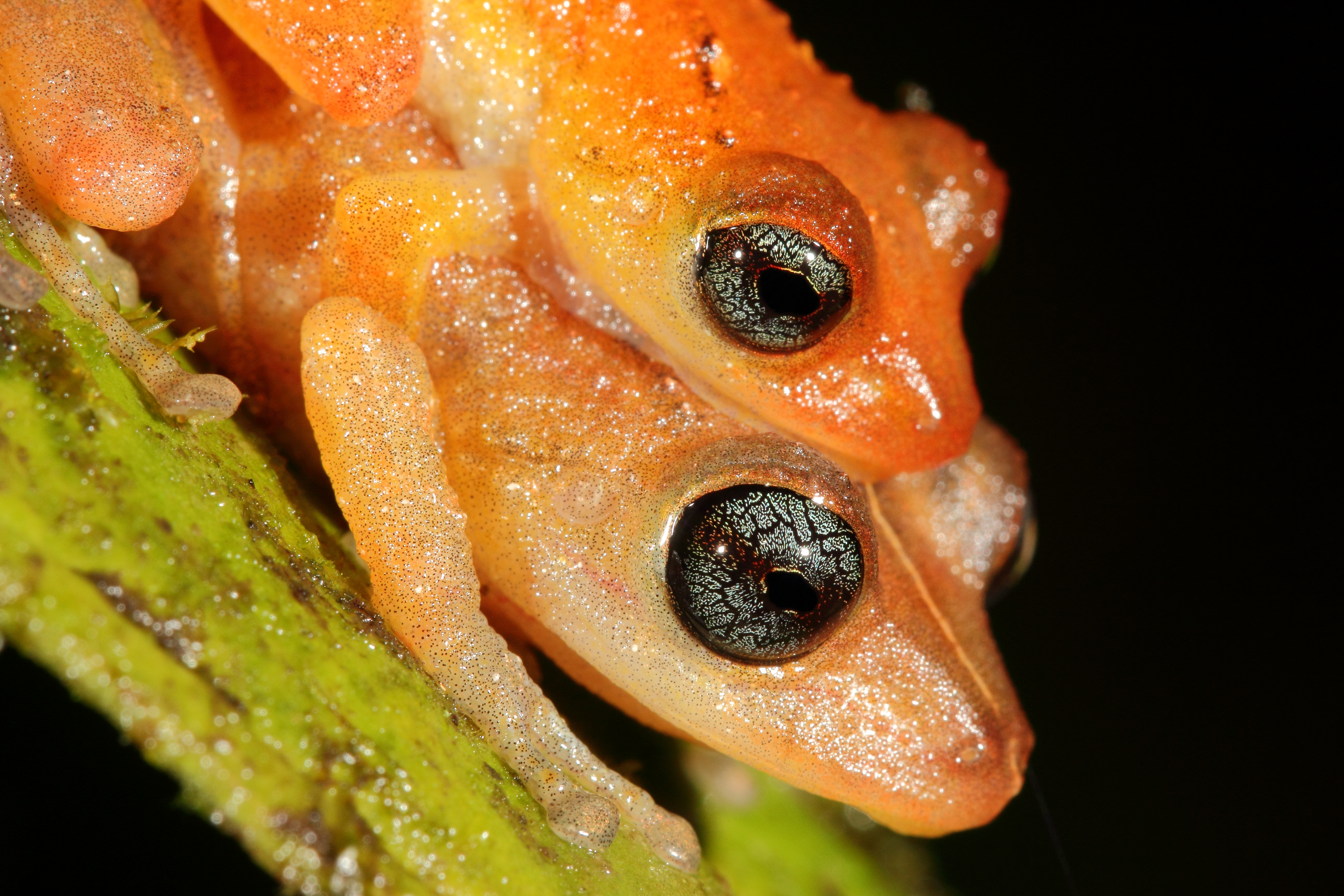

Conservation status
- Vulnerable (IUCN 3.1)

Scientific classification
- Kingdom: Animalia
- Phylum: Chordata
- Class: Amphibia
- Order: Anura
- Clade: Brachycephaloidea
- Family: Craugastoridae
- Genus: Pristimantis
- Species: P. scolodiscus

Binomial name
- Pristimantis scolodiscus (Lynch and Burrowes, 1990)

Synonyms
- Eleutherodactylus scolodiscus Lynch and Burrowes, 1990

= Pristimantis scolodiscus =

Species of frog

Pristimantis scolodiscus is a species of frog in the family Strabomantidae. It is found on the Pacific slopes of the Andes in northern Ecuador (Esmeraldas and Carchi Provinces) and in the Colombian Massif in the Nariño Department in the adjacent south-western Colombia. Its elevational range is 1,200–1,780 m (3,940–5,840 ft) above sea level.

== Description ==
Males measure 17.6–20.4 mm (0.69–0.80 in) and females 18.4–22.3 mm (0.72–0.88 in) in snout–vent length. The dorsum is slightly granular and (pale) orange in colouration, sometimes with brown specks; the belly is white. The iris is greyish blue. The tympanum is indistinct. The males have vocal sacks. The disk of the third finger has a papilla on its tip, hence the specific name scolodiscus, from Greek skolos (pointed) and diskus (disk).

== Habitat and conservation ==
Pristimantis scolodiscus inhabit dense, undisturbed cloud forests. They are nocturnal and usually found active on vegetation 1–3 m (3 ft 3 in – 9 ft 10 in) above the ground, sometimes along streams.

The species is threatened by habitat loss caused by agricultural development. Also chytridiomycosis might be a threat. It occurs in the La Planada National Reserve in Colombia—its type locality—and might occur in the Reserva Ecológica Cotacachi-Cayapas in Ecuador.
