= Pristimantis sulculus =

Conservation status
- Vulnerable (IUCN 3.1)

Scientific classification
- Kingdom: Animalia
- Phylum: Chordata
- Class: Amphibia
- Order: Anura
- Clade: Brachycephaloidea
- Family: Craugastoridae
- Genus: Pristimantis
- Species: P. sulculus

Binomial name
- Pristimantis sulculus (Lynch & Burrowes, 1990)

Synonyms
- Eleutherodactylus sulculus Lynch & Burrowes, 1990

Species of frog

Pristimantis sulculus is a species of frog in the family Strabomantidae, which is found in Colombia and possibly Ecuador. Its natural habitats are tropical moist montane forests and rivers. It is threatened by habitat loss.
