= Pristimantis reclusas =

Conservation status
- Critically Endangered (IUCN 3.1)

Scientific classification
- Kingdom: Animalia
- Phylum: Chordata
- Class: Amphibia
- Order: Anura
- Clade: Brachycephaloidea
- Family: Craugastoridae
- Genus: Pristimantis
- Species: P. reclusas

Binomial name
- Pristimantis reclusas (Lynch, 2003)

Synonyms
- Eleutherodactylus reclusas Lynch, 2003

Species of amphibian

Pristimantis reclusas is a species of frogs in the family Craugastoridae.

It is found in Colombia and possibly Venezuela. It is threatened by habitat loss.
