= Pristimantis duende =

Conservation status
- Vulnerable (IUCN 3.1)

Scientific classification
- Kingdom: Animalia
- Phylum: Chordata
- Class: Amphibia
- Order: Anura
- Clade: Brachycephaloidea
- Family: Craugastoridae
- Genus: Pristimantis
- Species: P. duende

Binomial name
- Pristimantis duende (Lynch, 2001)

Synonyms
- Eleutherodactylus duende Lynch, 2001

Species of frog

Pristimantis duende is a species of frog in the family Strabomantidae. It is endemic to Colombia. Its natural habitat is tropical high-altitude grassland.
