= Pristimantis actites =

Conservation status
- Vulnerable (IUCN 3.1)

Scientific classification
- Kingdom: Animalia
- Phylum: Chordata
- Class: Amphibia
- Order: Anura
- Clade: Brachycephaloidea
- Family: Craugastoridae
- Genus: Pristimantis
- Species: P. actites

Binomial name
- Pristimantis actites (Lynch, 1979)

Synonyms
- Eleutherodactylus actites Lynch, 1979

Species of frog

Pristimantis actites is a species of frog in the family Strabomantidae. It is endemic to Ecuador. Its natural habitats are tropical dry forests, moist montane forests, rural gardens, and heavily degraded former forest. It is threatened by habitat loss.
