= Pristimantis sobetes =

Conservation status
- Vulnerable (IUCN 3.1)

Scientific classification
- Kingdom: Animalia
- Phylum: Chordata
- Class: Amphibia
- Order: Anura
- Clade: Brachycephaloidea
- Family: Craugastoridae
- Genus: Pristimantis
- Species: P. sobetes

Binomial name
- Pristimantis sobetes (Lynch, 1980)

Synonyms
- Eleutherodactylus sobetes Lynch, 1980

Species of frog

Pristimantis sobetes is a species of frog in the family Strabomantidae. It is endemic to Ecuador. Its natural habitat is tropical moist montane forests. It is threatened by habitat loss.
