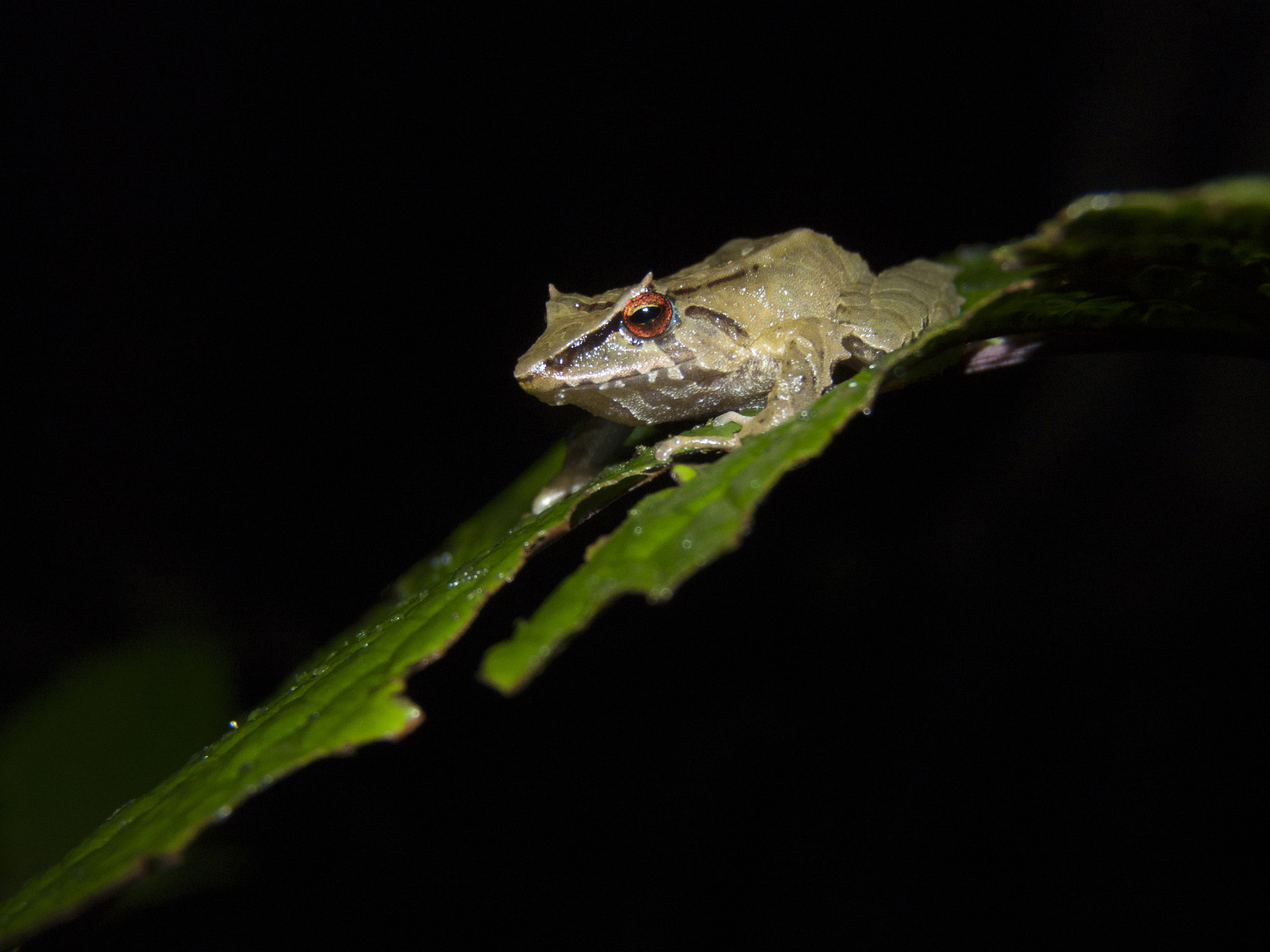

Conservation status
- Vulnerable (IUCN 3.1)

Scientific classification
- Kingdom: Animalia
- Phylum: Chordata
- Class: Amphibia
- Order: Anura
- Clade: Brachycephaloidea
- Family: Craugastoridae
- Genus: Pristimantis
- Species: P. silverstonei

Binomial name
- Pristimantis silverstonei (Lynch and Ruíz-Carranza, 1996)

Synonyms
- Eleutherodactylus silverstonei Lynch and Ruíz-Carranza, 1996

= Pristimantis silverstonei =

Species of frog

Pristimantis silverstonei, also known as Silverstone's Robber Frog, is a species of frog in the family Strabomantidae. It is endemic to the Pacific slope of the Cordillera Occidental in the Valle del Cauca and Chocó Departments, Colombia. The specific name silverstonei honors Philip Arthur Silverstone-Sopkin, an American botanist and herpetologist.

== Habitat and conservation ==
Pristimantis silverstonei is a nocturnal frog found on medium to high level vegetation in primary cloud forest at elevations of 1,700–2,250 m (5,580–7,380 ft) above sea level. Development is direct (i.e., there is no free-living larval stage).

A formerly common species, Pristimantis silverstonei has undergone a decline that took place in the mid–late 1990s and is possibly caused by chytridiomycosis. There are some indications that the populations might be recovering. Nevertheless, also habitat loss remains a threat. It occurs in two protected areas: Cerro El Inglés Natural Reserve and Tatamá National Natural Park. Its range is also close to the Farallones de Cali National Natural Park.
