= Pristimantis celator =

Conservation status
- Vulnerable (IUCN 3.1)

Scientific classification
- Kingdom: Animalia
- Phylum: Chordata
- Class: Amphibia
- Order: Anura
- Family: Strabomantidae
- Genus: Pristimantis
- Subgenus: Pristimantis
- Species: P. celator

Binomial name
- Pristimantis celator (Lynch, 1976)

Synonyms
- Eleutherodactylus celator Lynch, 1976

Species of frog

Pristimantis celator is a species of frog in the family Strabomantidae. It is found on the Pacific versant of the western Andes in southern Colombia (Nariño Department) and northern Ecuador. It is a nocturnal frog that occurs in terrestrial bromeliads found on the sides of roads and in herbaceous vegetation in leafy cloud forests. It tolerates some habitat change as long as bromeliads are present, but is threatened by deforestation.
