= Pristimantis modipeplus =

Conservation status
- Endangered (IUCN 3.1)

Scientific classification
- Kingdom: Animalia
- Phylum: Chordata
- Class: Amphibia
- Order: Anura
- Family: Strabomantidae
- Genus: Pristimantis
- Species: P. modipeplus

Binomial name
- Pristimantis modipeplus (Lynch, 1981)

Synonyms
- Eleutherodactylus modipeplus Lynch, 1981

Species of frog

Pristimantis modipeplus is a species of frog in the family Strabomantidae. It is endemic to the Andes of central Ecuador in Chimborazo, Pichincha, and Tungurahua Provinces. Common name Urbina robber frog has been proposed for it.

== Description ==
Adult males measure 25–29 mm (1.0–1.1 in) and adult females 28–35 mm (1.1–1.4 in) in snout–vent length. The head is narrower than the body and slightly wider than it is long. The snout is subacuminate in dorsal view and bluntly rounded in lateral profile. The tympanum is prominent but its upper edge is concealed by the thick supratympanic fold. The finger and toe tips bear discs. Coloration is dorsally brown to reddish-brown with creamy-tan interorbital bar and sacral spot, both edged with black. The groin, axilla, and concealed parts of the thigh and shank are reddish orange to blood red. Males have pale yellow throat. The venter is dirty cream, possibly with or gray and brown marbling. The iris is gray with brown marbling and a medium reddish brown horizontal streak. Males have a subgular vocal sac.

== Habitat and conservation ==
Pristimantis modipeplus occurs in páramo grassland and sub-páramo bush land at elevations of 2,560–3,700 m (8,400–12,140 ft) above sea level. Specimens have been found beneath a large flat rock beside a stream and beneath clumps of dirt in a dried-up vernal pond. Development presumably is direct (i.e., there is no free-living larval stage).

Pristimantis modipeplus is an uncommon species that is threatened by habitat loss and degradation associated with, e.g., agriculture, livestock farming, and pine plantations. It is not known to occur in protected areas.
