= Pristimantis bicolor =

Conservation status
- Vulnerable (IUCN 3.1)

Scientific classification
- Kingdom: Animalia
- Phylum: Chordata
- Class: Amphibia
- Order: Anura
- Clade: Brachycephaloidea
- Family: Craugastoridae
- Genus: Pristimantis
- Species: P. bicolor

Binomial name
- Pristimantis bicolor (Rueda-Almonacid & Lynch, 1983)

Synonyms
- Eleutherodactylus bicolor Rueda-Almonacid & Lynch, 1983

Species of frog

Pristimantis bicolor is a species of frog in the family Strabomantidae. It is endemic to Colombia. Its natural habitats are tropical moist montane forests and rivers. It is threatened by habitat loss.
