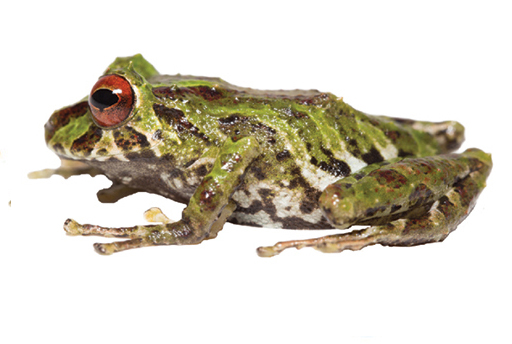

Conservation status
- Vulnerable (IUCN 3.1)

Scientific classification
- Kingdom: Animalia
- Phylum: Chordata
- Class: Amphibia
- Order: Anura
- Clade: Brachycephaloidea
- Family: Craugastoridae
- Genus: Pristimantis
- Species: P. eriphus

Binomial name
- Pristimantis eriphus (Lynch & Duellman, 1980)

Synonyms
- Eleutherodactylus eriphus Lynch & Duellman, 1980

= Pristimantis eriphus =

Species of frog

Pristimantis eriphus is a species of frog in the family Strabomantidae. It is found in Colombia and Ecuador. Its natural habitats are tropical moist montane forests and heavily degraded former forest. It is threatened by habitat loss.
