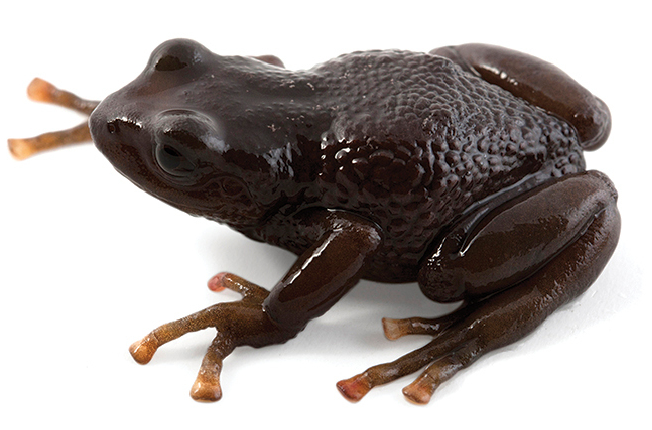

Conservation status
- Least Concern (IUCN 3.1)

Scientific classification
- Kingdom: Animalia
- Phylum: Chordata
- Class: Amphibia
- Order: Anura
- Family: Strabomantidae
- Genus: Pristimantis
- Species: P. orcesi

Binomial name
- Pristimantis orcesi (Lynch, 1972)

Synonyms
- Eleutherodactylus orcesi Lynch, 1972

= Pristimantis orcesi =

Species of frog

Pristimantis orcesi is a species of frog in the family Strabomantidae. It is endemic to the Andes of central and northern Ecuador. The specific name orcesi honors Gustavo Orcés, an Ecuadorian naturalist. Common names Orces robber frog and Bolivar robber frog have been proposed for this species.

== Description ==
Adult males measure 24–30 mm (0.9–1.2 in) and adult females 35–36 mm (1.4–1.4 in) in snout–vent length. The snout is short and rounded. The tympanum is visible. The fingers and toes bear lateral fringes as well as discs at their tips. The dorsum is dark chocolate-brown or black with white warts. The venter is paler than the dorsum. The iris is deep chocolate-brown. Males have a vocal sac.

== Habitat and conservation ==
Pristimantis orcesi is associated with terrestrial bromeliads and rocks in dry páramo grassland at elevations of 3,160–3,800 m (10,370–12,470 ft) above sea level near small steams that retain some moisture. Development is direct (i.e., there is no free-living larval stage). It is potentially threatened by feral cows and fire. It is known from the Llanganates and Sangay National Parks and its range overlaps with some other protected areas.
