= Pristimantis racemus =

Conservation status
- Vulnerable (IUCN 3.1)

Scientific classification
- Kingdom: Animalia
- Phylum: Chordata
- Class: Amphibia
- Order: Anura
- Family: Strabomantidae
- Genus: Pristimantis
- Subgenus: Pristimantis
- Species: P. racemus

Binomial name
- Pristimantis racemus (Lynch, 1980)

Synonyms
- Eleutherodactylus racemus Lynch, 1980

Species of frog

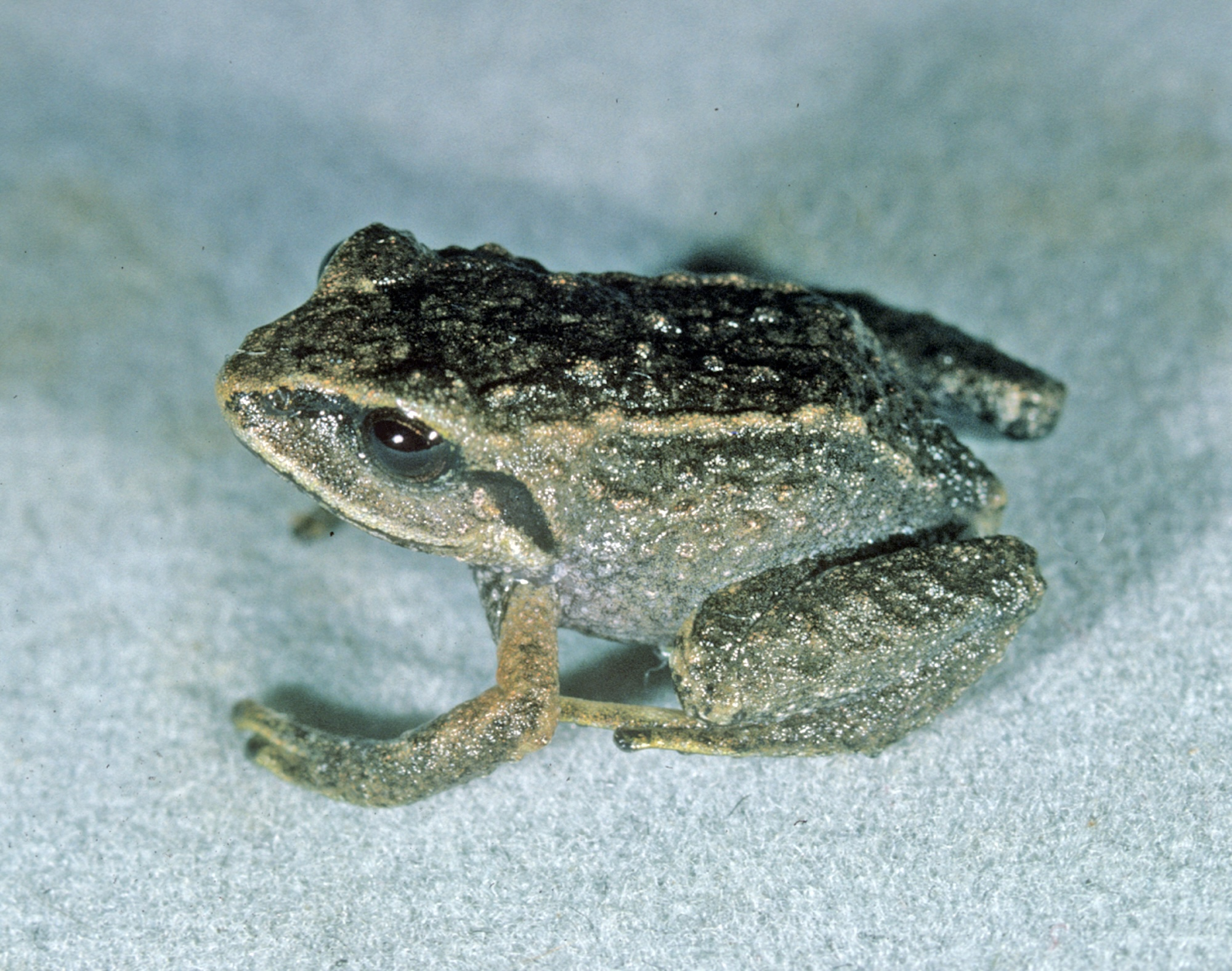
Pristimantis racemus

Pristimantis racemus is a species of frog in the family Strabomantidae. It is endemic to Colombia and known from the páramos of Cordillera Central along the Valle del Cauca–Tolima Department borderland north to the Quindío Department. Common name Las Hermosas robber frog has been coined for it. The specific name racemus is Latin and means "a bunch of berries", and refers to the warty skin of this species.

== Description ==
Adult males measure 25–30 mm (0.98–1.18 in) and adult females 30–38 mm (1.2–1.5 in) in snout–vent length. The head is narrower than the body in adult females, but as broad as the body in males and juveniles. The snout is rounded (or feebly sloping in lateral profile). The supratympanic fold is swollen and obscures the upper edge of the tympanum. The canthus rostralis is distinct. Skin of the paravertebral areas and flanks has large, flat warts, whereas skin in center of the back has only small granulations. The fingers and toes have prominent lateral fringes and broad discs. In preserved specimens, the dorsum is reddish-brown above with dark brown markings consisting of an interorbital bar, parentheses in scapular region, and scattered spots. The throat is brown and has some darker brown flecks. The venter is dirty white and has brown spots and reticulation.

== Habitat and conservation ==
Pristimantis racemus occurs in páramos at elevations of 3,000–3,570 m (9,840–11,710 ft) above sea level. It is mostly found in gramineous or sparse vegetation. Development is direct (no free-living larvae); the female may "brood" her eggs.

It is a common species that is not facing known threats. Its range overlaps with several protected areas.
