= Pristimantis calcarulatus =

Conservation status
- Vulnerable (IUCN 3.1)

Scientific classification
- Kingdom: Animalia
- Phylum: Chordata
- Class: Amphibia
- Order: Anura
- Clade: Brachycephaloidea
- Family: Craugastoridae
- Genus: Pristimantis
- Species: P. calcarulatus

Binomial name
- Pristimantis calcarulatus (Lynch, 1976)

Synonyms
- Eleutherodactylus calcarulatus Lynch, 1976

Species of frog

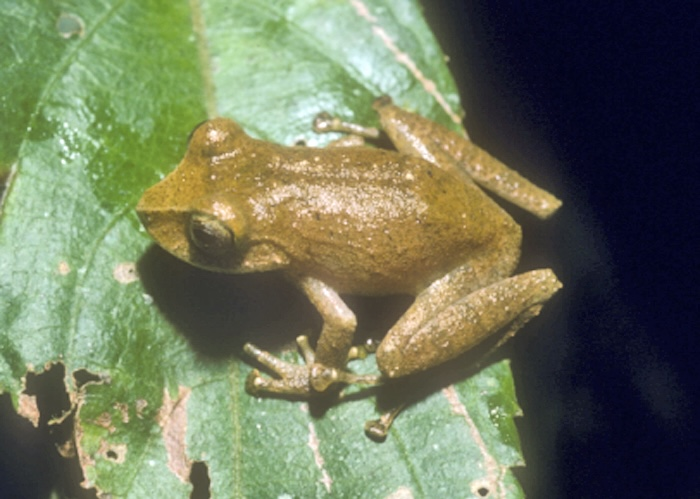

Pristimantis calcarulatus is a species of frog in the family Strabomantidae. It is found in Colombia and Ecuador. Its natural habitats are tropical moist montane forests and rivers. It is threatened by habitat loss.

== Sources ==
- Castro, F., Ron, S., Coloma, L.A., Yánez-Muñoz, M. & Cisneros-Heredia, D. 2004. Eleutherodactylus calcarulatus. 2006 IUCN Red List of Threatened Species. Downloaded on 22 July 2007.
