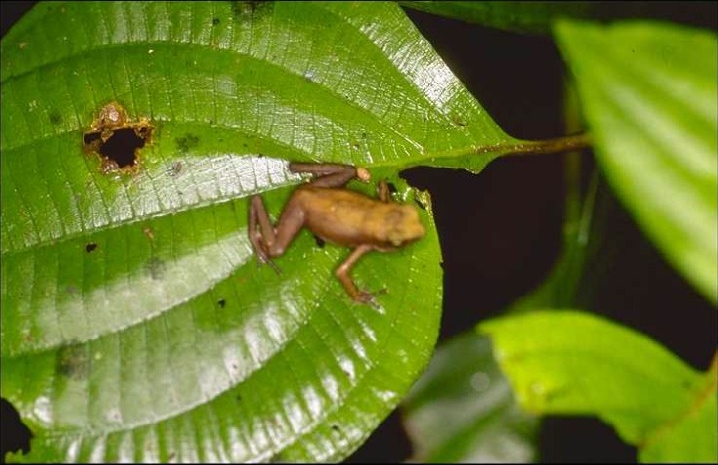

Conservation status
- Least Concern (IUCN 3.1)

Scientific classification
- Kingdom: Animalia
- Phylum: Chordata
- Class: Amphibia
- Order: Anura
- Family: Bufonidae
- Genus: Atelopus
- Species: A. franciscus

Binomial name
- Atelopus franciscus Lescure, 1974

Audio
- Male territorial call

= Atelopus franciscus =

Species of amphibian

Atelopus franciscus, the Central Coast stubfoot toad, is a species of toad in the family Bufonidae, endemic to the central coastal region of French Guiana. It is a locally common, diurnal species found near fast-flowing small streams and creeks in lowland rainforest. Many authors have suggested this taxon might be a synonym of Atelopus flavescens. It is threatened by habitat loss.

== Reproduction and behaviour ==
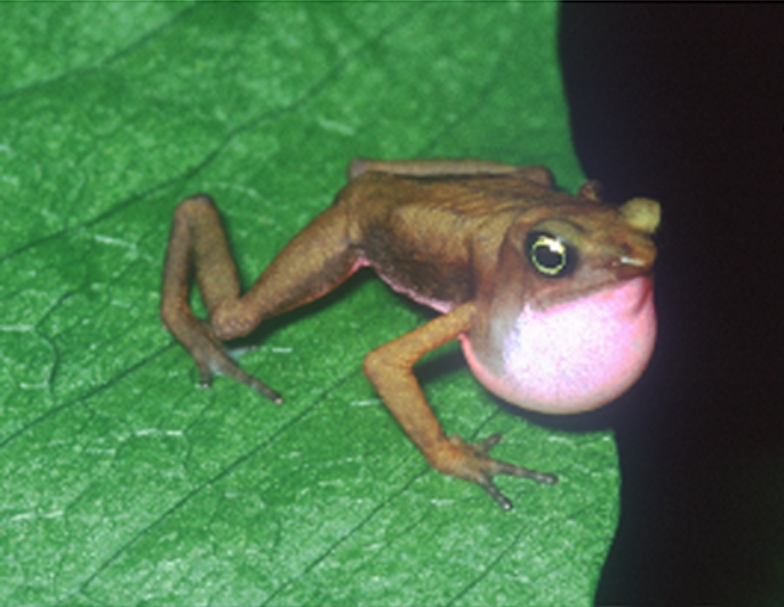
Male with internal vocal sac

To attract females and to defend their territories, males of A. franciscus use advertisement calls, not visual displays as typical for Atelopus. This is somewhat unexpected, given their environment is noisy and males must acoustically compete with males of several other frog species (e.g., Allobates femoralis and Otophryne pyburni). Moreover, this species lacks an external vocal sac, so can only produce low-intensity calls that propagate short distances—less than eight metres (26 ft). It also lacks external tympana and could be considered anatomically deaf. Nevertheless, it has a well-developed inner ear and has been shown to respond acoustically to the calls of conspecifics in the field.

Male territories are closely spaced, only 2–4 metres (6 ft 7 in – 13 ft 1 in) apart on average, and despite the handicaps discussed above, acoustic communication appears sufficiently efficient at these short distances.

Eggs are laid in the water. The tadpoles adhere to rocks.
