= Pristimantis cryophilius =

Conservation status
- Endangered (IUCN 3.1)

Scientific classification
- Kingdom: Animalia
- Phylum: Chordata
- Class: Amphibia
- Order: Anura
- Clade: Brachycephaloidea
- Family: Craugastoridae
- Genus: Pristimantis
- Subgenus: Pristimantis
- Species: P. cryophilius

Binomial name
- Pristimantis cryophilius (Lynch, 1979)

Synonyms
- Eleutherodactylus cryophilius Lynch, 1979

Species of amphibian

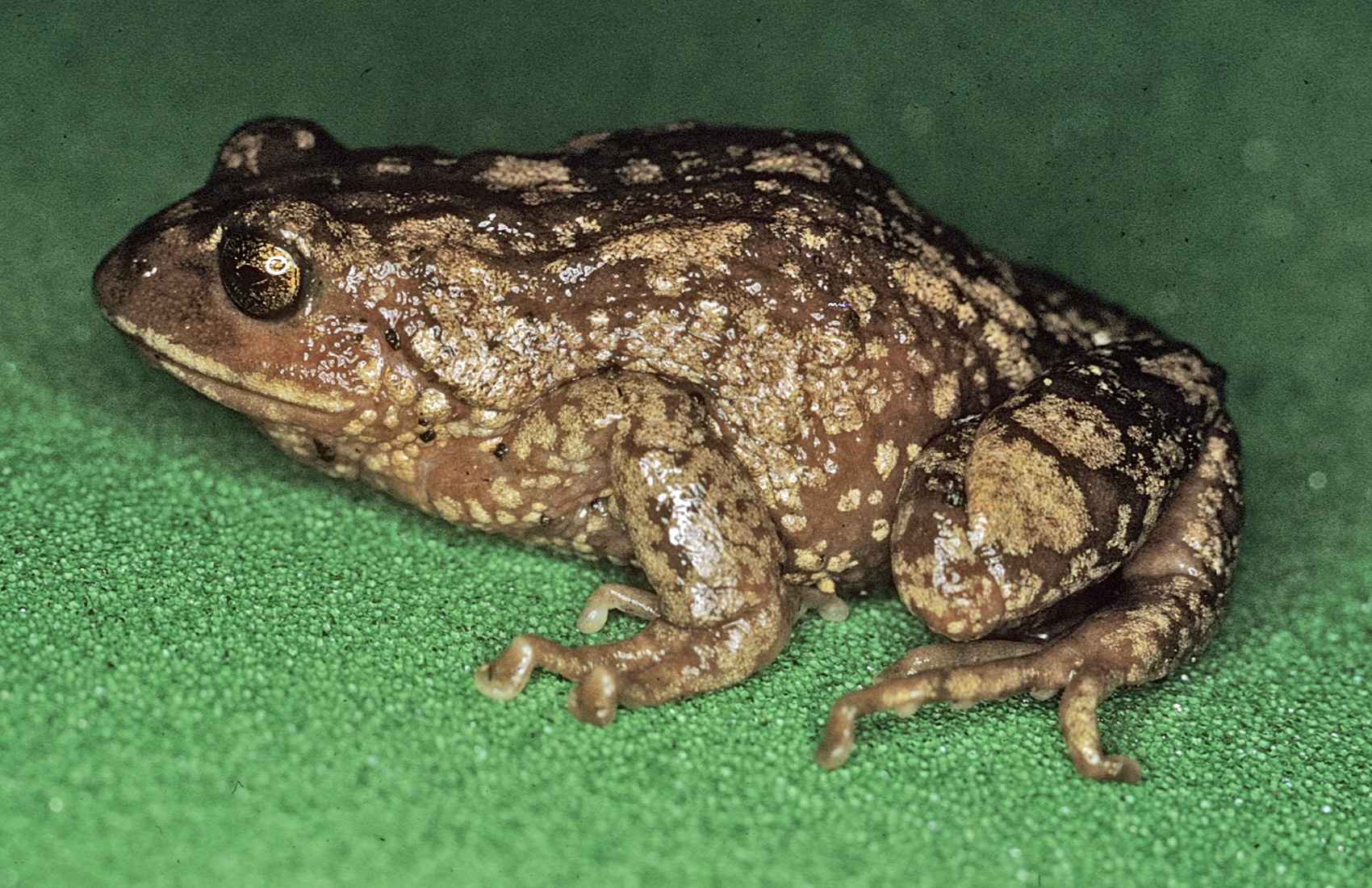

Pristimantis cryophilius is a species of frog in the family Strabomantidae. It is endemic to the Ecuadorian Andes in the Azuay, Cañar, and Morona-Santiago Provinces. The specific name cryophilius is derived from Greek kryos for cold and philois for loving and refers to the affinity of this species for cold climate. Common name San Vicente robber frog has been coined for it.

== Description ==
Adult males measure 29–37 mm (1.1–1.5 in) and adult females 43–50 mm (1.7–2.0 in) in snout–vent length. The snout is subacuminate in dorsal view and pointed when viewed laterally. The tympanum is hidden. All digits bear discs; the fingers have lateral fringes and the toes have lateral keels. Dorsal skin has flattened warts. The dorsolateral folds are present but indistinct. Coloration is medium brown with a network of darker brown on the body and limbs. There is some yellow flecking on flanks. The venter as well as the posterior surfaces of the thighs are rose-brown. The venter is flecked with cream. The iris is golden yellow with brown flecks.

== Habitat and conservation ==
Pristimantis cryophilius occurs in sub-páramo shrubland and páramo grassland habitats at elevations of 2,835–3,384 m (9,301–11,102 ft) above sea level. Individuals have been found under rocks and logs. This species is threatened by habitat loss and degradation caused primarily by agriculture. It is found in the El Cajas National Park and its range overlaps with the Sangay National Park.
