= Pristimantis pteridophilus =

Conservation status
- Endangered (IUCN 3.1)

Scientific classification
- Kingdom: Animalia
- Phylum: Chordata
- Class: Amphibia
- Order: Anura
- Clade: Brachycephaloidea
- Family: Craugastoridae
- Genus: Pristimantis
- Species: P. pteridophilus

Binomial name
- Pristimantis pteridophilus (Lynch & Duellman, 1997)

Synonyms
- Eleutherodactylus pteridophilus Lynch & Duellman, 1997

Species of amphibian

Pristimantis pteridophilus is a species of frog in the family Strabomantidae.

It is endemic to Ecuador. Its natural habitats are tropical moist montane forests and heavily degraded former forest. It is threatened by habitat loss.
