= Pristimantis ganonotus =

Conservation status
- Data Deficient (IUCN 3.1)

Scientific classification
- Kingdom: Animalia
- Phylum: Chordata
- Class: Amphibia
- Order: Anura
- Clade: Brachycephaloidea
- Family: Craugastoridae
- Genus: Pristimantis
- Species: P. ganonotus

Binomial name
- Pristimantis ganonotus (Duellman & Lynch, 1988)

Synonyms
- Eleutherodactylus ganonotus Duellman & Lynch, 1988

Species of frog

Pristimantis ganonotus is a species of frog in the family Strabomantidae. It is endemic to Ecuador. Its natural habitats are tropical moist montane forest and heavily degraded former forest. It is threatened by habitat loss.
