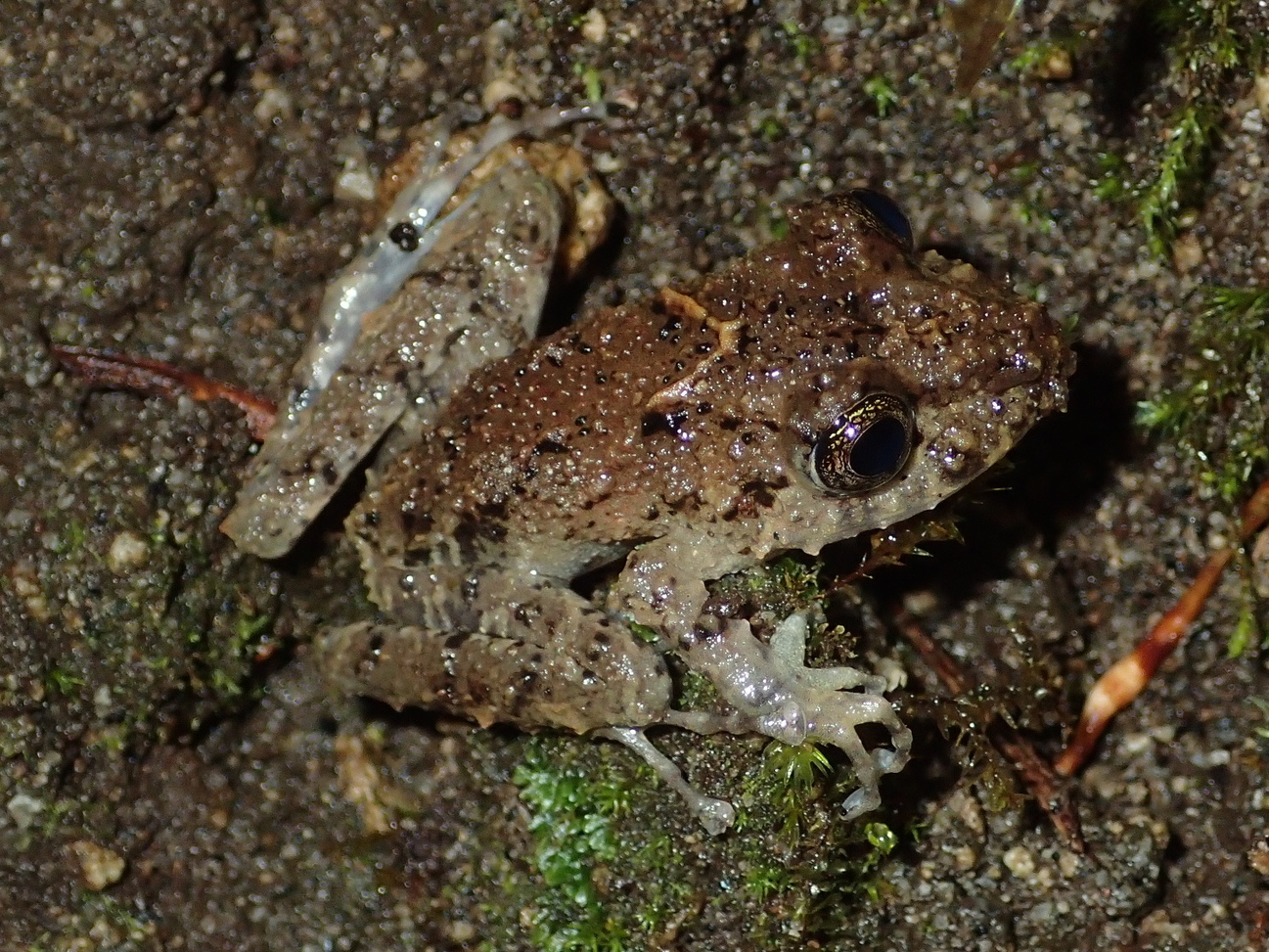

Conservation status
- Endangered (IUCN 3.1)

Scientific classification
- Kingdom: Animalia
- Phylum: Chordata
- Class: Amphibia
- Order: Anura
- Clade: Brachycephaloidea
- Family: Craugastoridae
- Genus: Pristimantis
- Species: P. crenunguis

Binomial name
- Pristimantis crenunguis (Lynch, 1976)

Synonyms
- Eleutherodactylus crenunguis Lynch, 1976

= Pristimantis crenunguis =

Species of frog

Pristimantis crenunguis is a species of frog in the family Strabomantidae. It is endemic to Ecuador. Its natural habitats are tropical moist lowland forests, moist montane forests, and rivers. It is threatened by habitat loss.
