= Pristimantis xestus =

Conservation status
- Vulnerable (IUCN 3.1)

Scientific classification
- Kingdom: Animalia
- Phylum: Chordata
- Class: Amphibia
- Order: Anura
- Clade: Brachycephaloidea
- Family: Craugastoridae
- Genus: Pristimantis
- Species: P. xestus

Binomial name
- Pristimantis xestus (Lynch, 1995)

Synonyms
- Eleutherodactylus xestus Lynch, 1995

Species of frog

Pristimantis xestus is a species of frog in the family Strabomantidae. It is endemic to Colombia. Its natural habitat is tropical high-altitude grassland.
