= Pristimantis platychilus =

Conservation status
- Vulnerable (IUCN 3.1)

Scientific classification
- Kingdom: Animalia
- Phylum: Chordata
- Class: Amphibia
- Order: Anura
- Clade: Brachycephaloidea
- Family: Craugastoridae
- Genus: Pristimantis
- Species: P. platychilus

Binomial name
- Pristimantis platychilus (Lynch, 1996)

Synonyms
- Eleutherodactylus platychilus Lynch, 1996

Species of frog

Pristimantis platychilus, also known as the queremal rain frog, is a species of frog in the family Strabomantidae, first described by Lynch in 1996. It is endemic to Colombia. Its natural habitat is tropical moist montane forests. It is threatened by habitat loss.
