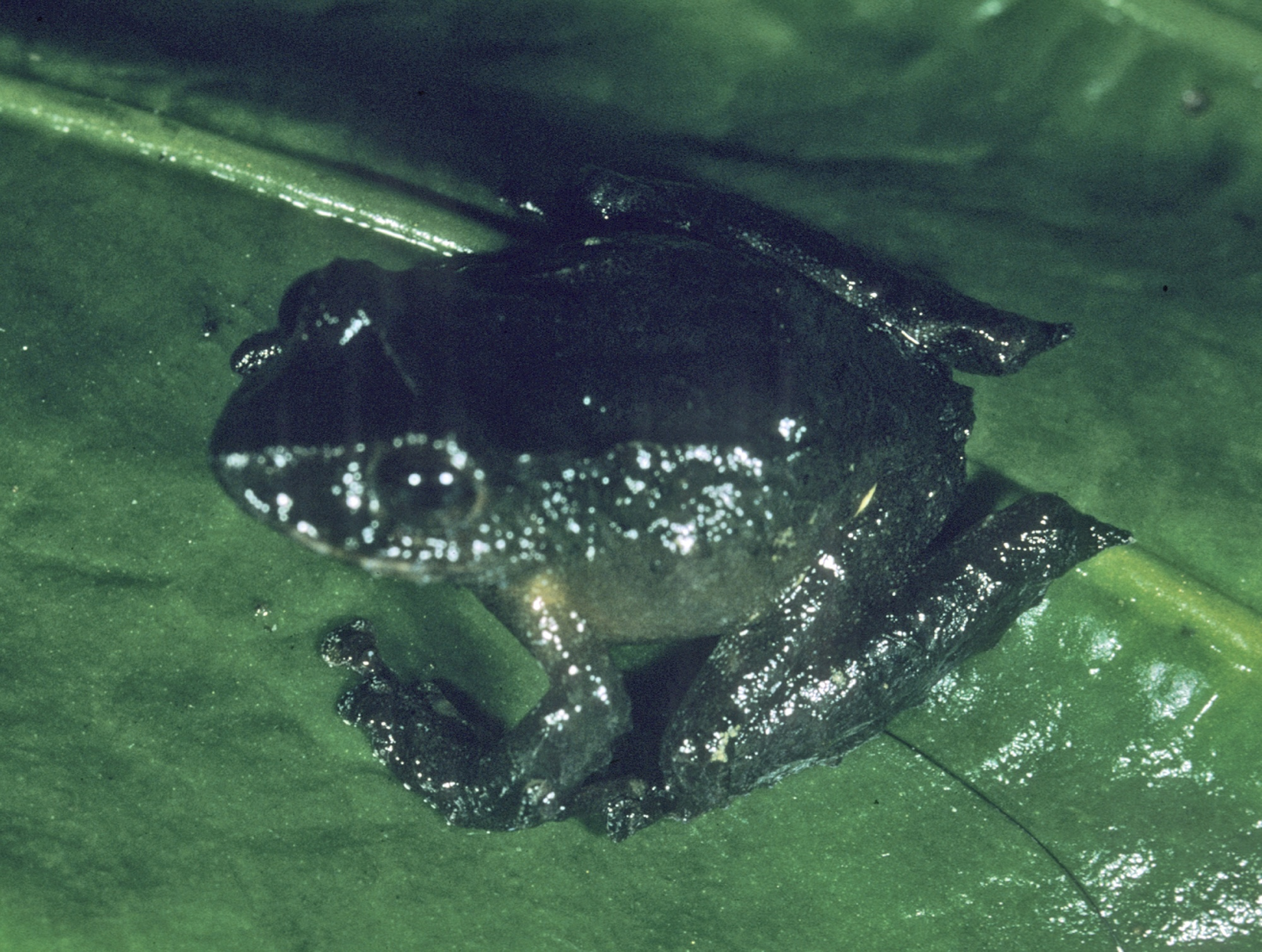

Conservation status
- Vulnerable (IUCN 3.1)

Scientific classification
- Kingdom: Animalia
- Phylum: Chordata
- Class: Amphibia
- Order: Anura
- Clade: Brachycephaloidea
- Family: Craugastoridae
- Genus: Pristimantis
- Species: P. quinquagesimus

Binomial name
- Pristimantis quinquagesimus (Lynch & Trueb, 1980)

Synonyms
- Eleutherodactylus quinquagesimus Lynch & Trueb, 1980

= Pristimantis quinquagesimus =

Species of frog

Pristimantis quinquagesimus is a species of frog in the family Strabomantidae. It is found in Colombia and Ecuador. Its natural habitats are tropical moist montane forests and rivers. It is threatened by habitat loss.
