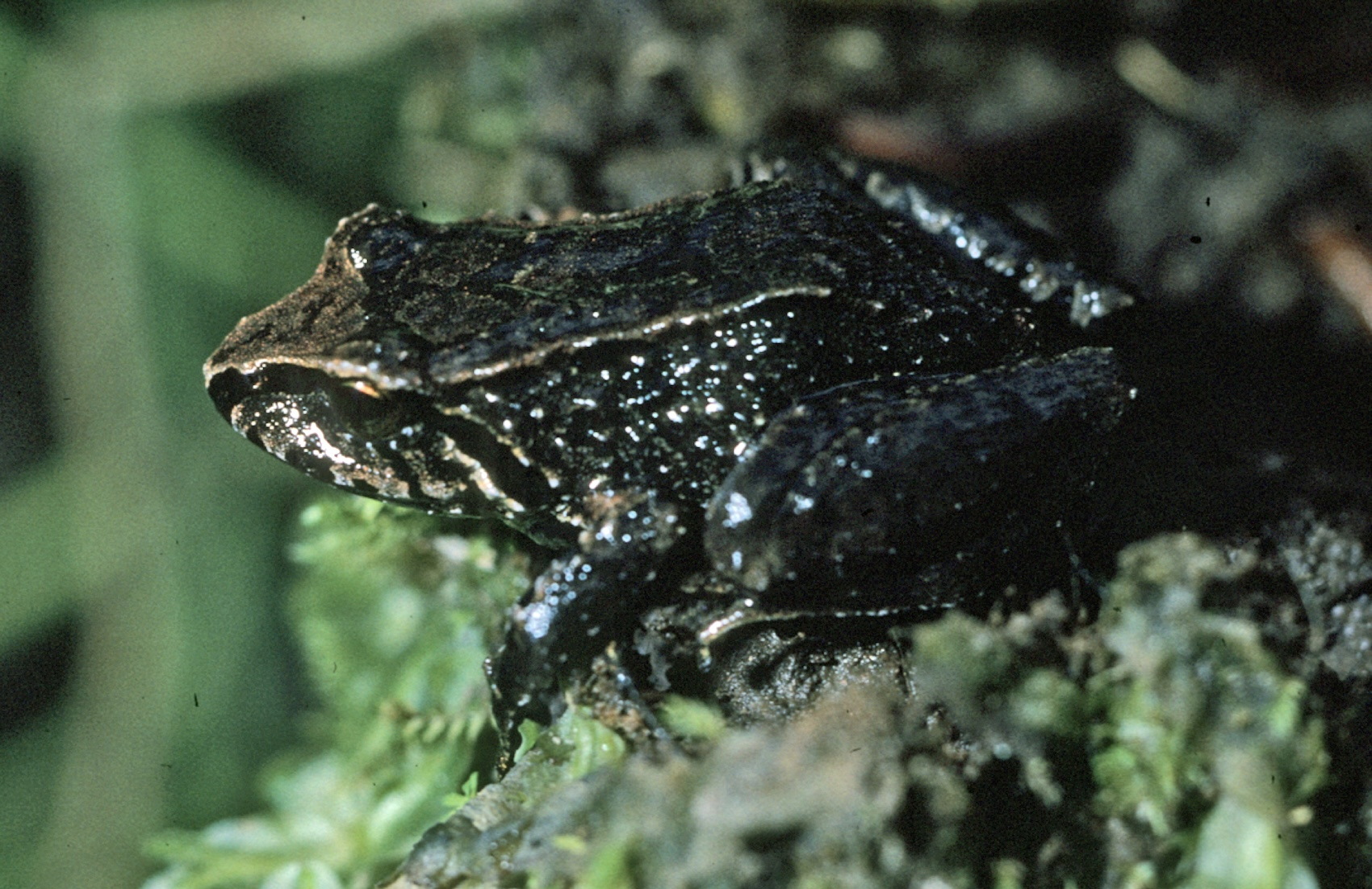
- Pristimantis truebae

Conservation status
- Endangered (IUCN 3.1)

Scientific classification
- Kingdom: Animalia
- Phylum: Chordata
- Class: Amphibia
- Order: Anura
- Clade: Brachycephaloidea
- Family: Craugastoridae
- Genus: Pristimantis
- Species: P. truebae

Binomial name
- Pristimantis truebae (Lynch & Duellman, 1997)

Synonyms
- Eleutherodactylus truebae Lynch & Duellman, 1997

= Pristimantis truebae =

Species of amphibian

Pristimantis truebae is a species of frog in the family Strabomantidae.

It is endemic to Ecuador, and its natural habitats are tropical moist montane forests, high-altitude shrubland, and high-altitude grassland. It is threatened by habitat loss.
