= Pristimantis colomai =

Conservation status
- Vulnerable (IUCN 3.1)

Scientific classification
- Kingdom: Animalia
- Phylum: Chordata
- Class: Amphibia
- Order: Anura
- Clade: Brachycephaloidea
- Family: Craugastoridae
- Genus: Pristimantis
- Species: P. colomai

Binomial name
- Pristimantis colomai (Lynch & Duellman, 1997)

Synonyms
- Eleutherodactylus colomai Lynch & Duellman, 1997

Species of amphibian

Pristimantis colomai is a species of frog in the family Strabomantidae. It is found in Colombia and Ecuador. Its natural habitats are tropical moist lowland forests and moist montane forests. It is threatened by habitat loss.
