= Pristimantis eremitus =

Conservation status
- Vulnerable (IUCN 3.1)

Scientific classification
- Kingdom: Animalia
- Phylum: Chordata
- Class: Amphibia
- Order: Anura
- Family: Strabomantidae
- Genus: Pristimantis
- Species: P. eremitus

Binomial name
- Pristimantis eremitus (Lynch, 1980)

Synonyms
- Eleutherodactylus eremitus Lynch, 1980

Species of frog

Pristimantis eremitus is a species of frog in the family Strabomantidae. It is found in the Cordillera Occidental in north-western Ecuador from the Cotopaxi Province northward and on western slope of the Colombian Massif in the Nariño Department, extreme south-western Colombia. The specific name eremitus is Latin for "lonely" or "solitary" and refers to this species being the only western-Andean species among its closest relatives. Common names Chiriboga robber frog and lonely rainfrog have been coined for it.

== Description ==
Adult males measure 17–22 mm (0.67–0.87 in) and adult females 27–28 mm (1.1–1.1 in) in snout–vent length. The snout is moderately long and subacuminate in dorsal view, rounded or weakly protruding when seen laterally. The tympanum is visible; the supra-tympanic fold is indistinct because of warts. Skin is dorsally areolate. The fingers and toes bear discs and prominent lateral fringes but no webbing. The dorsum is green and has darker markings (either reddish brown reticulations or brown flecks and dark canthal stripe that continues to the flank. The venter is white to pale yellow.

== Habitat and conservation ==
Pristimantis eremitus occurs in montane cloud forests at elevations of 1,540–2,470 m (5,050–8,100 ft) above sea level. It occurs in both primary and secondary forests. It is associated with both terrestrial and epipytic bromeliads as well as herbaceous vegetation and shrubs. Individuals have been found active during the daytime as high as 7 m (23 ft) above the ground.

This species is threatened by habitat loss caused by logging and agricultural development. It is known from the La Planada Reserve in Colombia, and its range overlaps with the Los Illinizas Ecological Reserve in Ecuador.
