= Pristimantis parvillus =

Conservation status
- Least Concern (IUCN 3.1)

Scientific classification
- Kingdom: Animalia
- Phylum: Chordata
- Class: Amphibia
- Order: Anura
- Clade: Brachycephaloidea
- Family: Craugastoridae
- Genus: Pristimantis
- Species: P. parvillus

Binomial name
- Pristimantis parvillus (Lynch, 1976)

Synonyms
- Eleutherodactylus parvillus Lynch, 1976

Species of frog

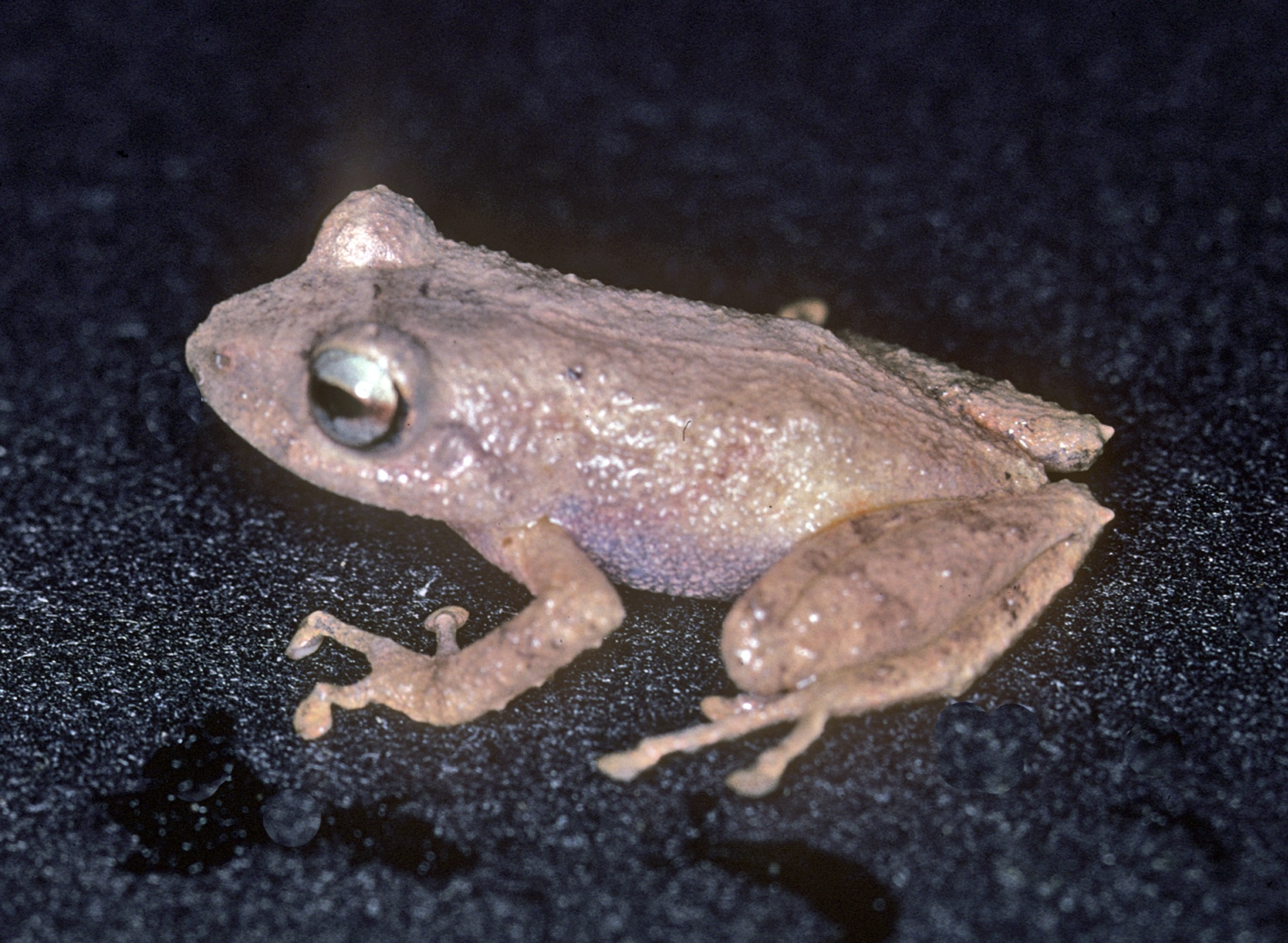
Pristimantis parvillus

Pristimantis parvillus is a species of frog in the family Strabomantidae. It is found in Colombia and Ecuador. Its natural habitats are tropical moist lowland forests, moist montane forests, and heavily degraded former forest. It is threatened by habitat loss.
