= Hyperolius torrentis =

Conservation status
- Vulnerable (IUCN 3.1)

Scientific classification
- Kingdom: Animalia
- Phylum: Chordata
- Class: Amphibia
- Order: Anura
- Family: Hyperoliidae
- Genus: Hyperolius
- Species: H. torrentis

Binomial name
- Hyperolius torrentis Schiøtz, 1967

Species of amphibian

Hyperolius torrentis is a species of frog in the family Hyperoliidae. It is known from the Akwapim-Togo Ranges along the border between Ghana and Togo as well as from northeastern Benin. Common name Ukami reed frog has been coined for this species.

== Description ==
Hyperolius torrentis is a relatively large member of its genus, with males measuring 31–38 mm (1.2–1.5 in) and females about 41 mm (1.6 in) in snout–vent length. The dorsum is uniformly yellow to brown or olive. Some males portray a darker albeit diffuse hour-glass pattern. The ventrum is yellowish orange. The discs are pink. Males have a small, circular gular flap.

The male advertisement call is an irregular series of "clicks" that have high intensity and a rather long duration; Hyperolius torrentis males sound "larger" than the sympatric H. concolor and H. baumanni.

== Habitat and conservation ==
Hyperolius torrentis is a forest species. Its range is an area where forests are severely degraded, but it does not occur outside forests. It is closely associated with very fast-flowing streams and waterfalls. Specifically, it has been encountered on or near vertical cliffs in forest, in gullies in open forest, and in trees and on vegetation close to streams. Breeding takes place in streams. The eggs are deposited on leaves above water.

Hyperolius torrentis is uncommon and only known from few locations; Hillers and colleagues, however, reported it as abundant at some Ghanaian sites, but could not find it in Togo. Its forest habitat is impacted by agricultural expansion, logging, and human settlements. It occurs in the Kyabobo National Park in Ghana. In view of its small and fragmented distribution and threats to its habitat, the International Union for Conservation of Nature (IUCN) has assessed it as "Vulnerable".
