= Pristimantis schultei =

Conservation status
- Vulnerable (IUCN 3.1)

Scientific classification
- Kingdom: Animalia
- Phylum: Chordata
- Class: Amphibia
- Order: Anura
- Family: Strabomantidae
- Genus: Pristimantis
- Species: P. schultei

Binomial name
- Pristimantis schultei (Duellman, 1990)

Synonyms
- Eleutherodactylus schultei Duellman, 1990

Species of frog

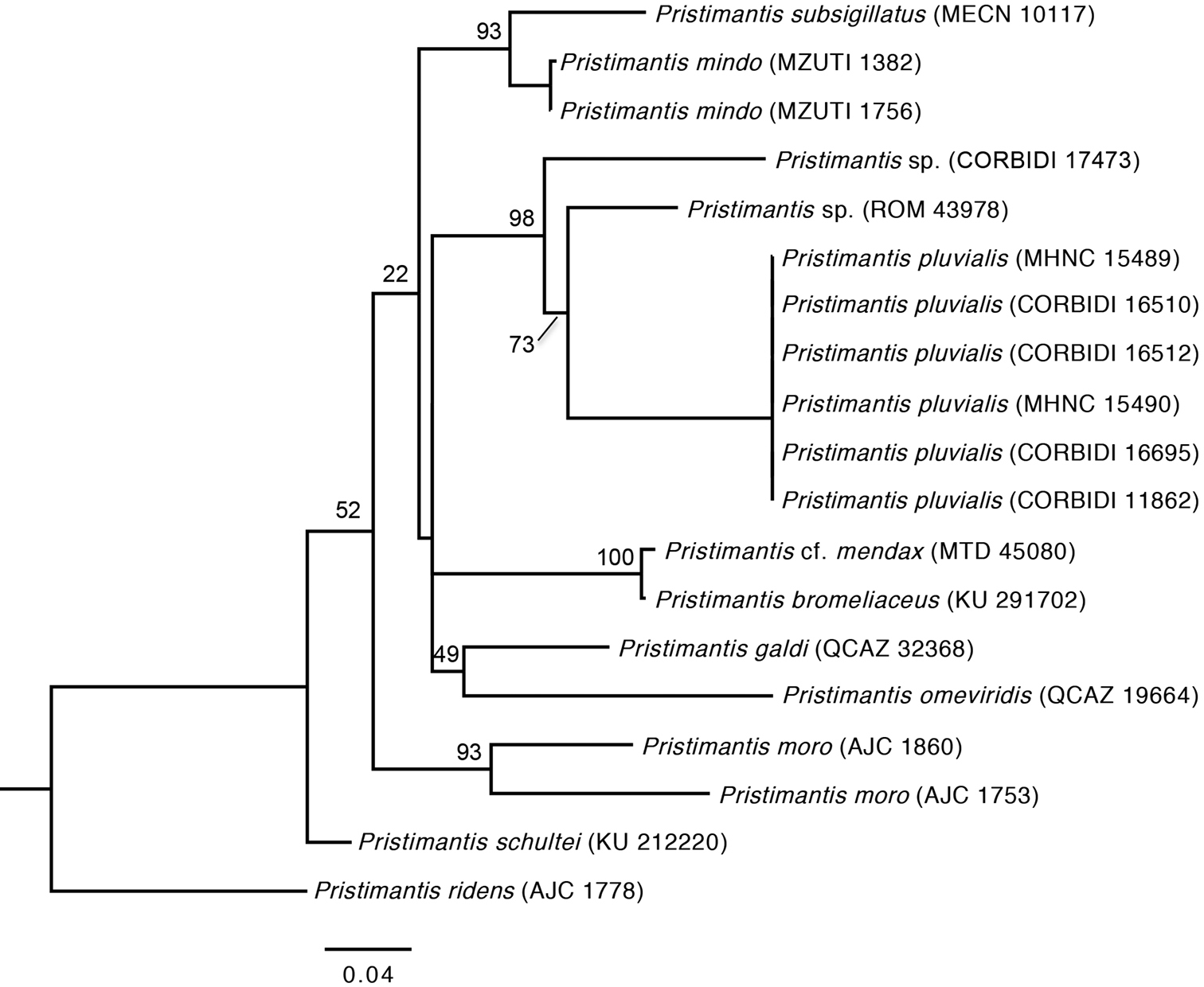
Phylogenetic tree of the Pristimantis genus

Pristimantis schultei is a species of frog in the family Strabomantidae. It is found in Ecuador and Peru. Its natural habitats are tropical moist montane forests and heavily degraded former forest. It is threatened by habitat loss.
