= Pristimantis johannesdei =

Conservation status
- Vulnerable (IUCN 3.1)

Scientific classification
- Kingdom: Animalia
- Phylum: Chordata
- Class: Amphibia
- Order: Anura
- Family: Strabomantidae
- Genus: Pristimantis
- Species: P. johannesdei

Binomial name
- Pristimantis johannesdei (Rivero & Serna, 1988)

Synonyms
- Eleutherodactylus johannesdei Rivero & Serna, 1988 "1987"

Species of frog

Pristimantis johannesdei is a species of frog in the family Strabomantidae. Its common name is Urrao robber frog. It is endemic to Colombia and found on the western flank of the Cordillera Occidental in the Antioquia and Risaralda Departments. Its natural habitat is tropical moist montane forests. It is threatened by habitat loss.
