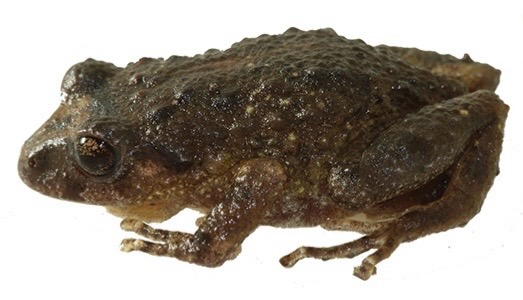

Conservation status
- Least Concern (IUCN 3.1)

Scientific classification
- Kingdom: Animalia
- Phylum: Chordata
- Class: Amphibia
- Order: Anura
- Family: Strabomantidae
- Genus: Pristimantis
- Species: P. lynchi

Binomial name
- Pristimantis lynchi (Duellman & Simmons, 1977)

Synonyms
- Eleutherodactylus lynchi Duellman & Simmons, 1977

= Pristimantis lynchi =

Species of frog

Pristimantis lynchi is a species of frog in the family Strabomantidae. It is endemic to Colombia. Its natural habitats are tropical moist montane forests and high-altitude grassland. It is threatened by habitat loss.
