= Pristimantis calcaratus =

Conservation status
- Vulnerable (IUCN 3.1)

Scientific classification
- Kingdom: Animalia
- Phylum: Chordata
- Class: Amphibia
- Order: Anura
- Family: Strabomantidae
- Genus: Pristimantis
- Species: P. calcaratus

Binomial name
- Pristimantis calcaratus (Boulenger, 1908)

Synonyms
- Eleutherodactylus calcaratus (Boulenger, 1908)

Species of frog

Pristimantis calcaratus is a species of frog in the family Strabomantidae. It is endemic to Colombia. Its natural habitat is tropical moist montane forests. It is threatened by habitat loss.
