= Dendropsophus stingi =

Conservation status
- Least Concern (IUCN 3.1)

Scientific classification
- Kingdom: Animalia
- Phylum: Chordata
- Class: Amphibia
- Order: Anura
- Family: Hylidae
- Genus: Dendropsophus
- Species: D. stingi

Binomial name
- Dendropsophus stingi (Kaplan, 1994)

Synonyms
- Hyla stingi Kaplan, 1994

Species of amphibian

Dendropsophus stingi is a species of frogs in the family Hylidae. It is endemic to Colombia and occurs on the eastern slope of the Cordillera Oriental in the Boyacá Department. The species was named after celebrity musician Sting in recognition of his "commitment and efforts to save the rain forest". Despite this, common name Kaplan's Garagoa treefrog has been coined for it (the type locality is near Garagoa).

== Description ==
Males in the type series measure 21.7–24.3 mm (0.85–0.96 in) and the single female 26.2 mm (1.03 in) in snout–vent length. The body is robust and the head is relatively wide. The snout is generally rounded, but in the female it is longer and acute in dorsal view. The tympanum is distinct. The fingers have wide discs and some webbing. The toes are 3/4 webbed. Skin is smooth except for the belly. The dorsum and head are pale to dark brown; there is a dark interorbital spot and two dark, chevron-shaped bands with black rims. Concealed surfaces of the limbs are pale yellowish brown and the belly is pale yellow cream.

== Habitat and conservation ==
Dendropsophus stingi live in flooded pastures, marshes, and temporary pools at about 2,000 m (6,600 ft) above sea level. No major threats to this species have been identified. It is locally common but its known range is small, making it vulnerable to stochastic events.
