= Pristimantis ginesi =

Conservation status
- Vulnerable (IUCN 3.1)

Scientific classification
- Kingdom: Animalia
- Phylum: Chordata
- Class: Amphibia
- Order: Anura
- Clade: Brachycephaloidea
- Family: Craugastoridae
- Genus: Pristimantis
- Species: P. ginesi

Binomial name
- Pristimantis ginesi (Rivero, 1964)

Synonyms
- Eleutherodactylus ginesi Rivero, 1964

Species of amphibian

Pristimantis ginesi is a species of frog in the family Strabomantidae.

It is endemic to Venezuela. Its natural habitat is tropical high-altitude grassland. It is threatened by habitat loss.
