= Pristimantis vertebralis =

Conservation status
- Vulnerable (IUCN 3.1)

Scientific classification
- Kingdom: Animalia
- Phylum: Chordata
- Class: Amphibia
- Order: Anura
- Family: Strabomantidae
- Genus: Pristimantis
- Subgenus: Pristimantis
- Species: P. vertebralis

Binomial name
- Pristimantis vertebralis (Boulenger, 1886)

Synonyms
- Hylodes vertebralis Boulenger, 1886; Eleutherodactylus vertebralis (Boulenger, 1886)

Species of frog

Pristimantis vertebralis is a species of frog in the family Strabomantidae. It is endemic to the Andes of Ecuador and occurs in the Carchi, Imbabura, Pichincha, Cotopaxi, Bolívar, and Azuay provinces. Common name vertebral robber frog has been coined for it.

== Description ==
Adult males measure 21–28 mm (0.8–1.1 in) and adult females 35–44 mm (1.4–1.7 in) in snout–vent length; Lynch (1979) gives somewhat higher maximum sizes (34 mm and 45 mm, respectively). The snout is subacuminate in dorsal view and rounded in profile. The tympanum is prominent. The upper eyelid has low tubercles. The fingers have narrow lateral keels and the toes lateral fringes but no webbing. The finger discs are large, those of the toes somewhat smaller. Coloration is highly variable. In one population, the dorsum was bronze-brown to reddish brown, and in another one, green, brick-red, brown, olive-brown, or yellowish brown; most individuals had black flecks. The venter is creamy yellow (sometimes with orange tint), with brown or black marbling. The iris is copper or nearly black.

== Habitat and conservation ==
Pristimantis vertebralis occurs in cloud forests and in humid and temperate montane forests at elevations of 1,800–3,000 m (5,900–9,800 ft) above sea level. It has been found near streams and in bromeliads. Development is direct, without free-living tadpole stage.

Pristimantis vertebralis is rare in most parts of its range. It is threatened by habitat degradation caused by smallholder agricultural activities and subsistence wood collection. It might also be threatened by chytridiomycosis. Its range overlaps with the Pululahua Geobotanical Reserve and Los Illinizas Ecological Reserve.
