= Pristimantis rufioculis =

Conservation status
- Vulnerable (IUCN 3.1)

Scientific classification
- Kingdom: Animalia
- Phylum: Chordata
- Class: Amphibia
- Order: Anura
- Clade: Brachycephaloidea
- Family: Craugastoridae
- Genus: Pristimantis
- Species: P. rufioculis

Binomial name
- Pristimantis rufioculis (Duellman and Pramuk, 1999)

Synonyms
- Eleutherodactylus rufioculis Duellman and Pramuk, 1999

Species of frog

Pristimantis rufioculis is a species of frog in the family Strabomantidae. It is found in the Andes of northern Peru (Cordillera Central, Cordillera del Cóndor) and adjacent Ecuador (Zamora-Chinchipe). The specific name rufioculis is derived from the Latin words rufiis, meaning red, and oculis, meaning eye—red iris is one of the distinguishing characteristics of this species. Accordingly, common name red-eyed robber frog has been proposed for this species.

== Description ==
Pristimantis rufioculis are relatively small frogs. Based on the type series, a subadult female (holotype) measured 20.6 mm (0.81 in) in snout–vent length, whereas a male (paratype) measured 18.1 mm (0.71 in). Dorsum is olive; females have two pairs of dull red spots, whereas males have grayish-white snout and tan elbows and heels in male. Groin, anterior surfaces, and thighs are mottled yellow and dull red; venter is yellow with brown mottling. Iris is red.

== Habitat and conservation ==
Pristimantis rufioculis inhabit humid montane forests at elevations of 1,138–2,870 m (3,734–9,416 ft) above sea level where they can be found on low vegetation (<1 m above the ground) at night. Presumably, as in other Pristimantis, development is direct (i.e, there is no free-living larval stage). Population status and threats to this species are poorly known, but it is present in some protected areas.
