= Pristimantis ceuthospilus =

Conservation status
- Vulnerable (IUCN 3.1)

Scientific classification
- Kingdom: Animalia
- Phylum: Chordata
- Class: Amphibia
- Order: Anura
- Family: Strabomantidae
- Genus: Pristimantis
- Subgenus: Pristimantis
- Species: P. ceuthospilus

Binomial name
- Pristimantis ceuthospilus (Duellman and Wild, 1993)

Synonyms
- Eleutherodactylus ceuthospilus Duellman and Wild, 1993

Species of amphibian

Pristimantis ceuthospilus is a species of frog in the family Strabomantidae. It is endemic to northern Peru and occurs on the western slopes of the Cordillera de Huancabamba and the Pacific slope of the Cordillera Occidental. There are also as yet unconfirmed records from southern Ecuador. The specific name ceuthospilus, from Greek keuthos ("hidden") and spilos ("spot"), refers to the yellow spots in the groin and thighs that remain hidden when the frog is sitting. Common name Wild's robber frog has been coined for it.

== Description ==
Adult males measure 19–26 mm (0.7–1.0 in) and adult females 24–27 mm (0.9–1.1 in) in snout–vent length. The snout is acutely rounded. The tympanum is round and distinct but obscured posterodorsally by the weak supratympanic fold. The fingers and the toes have elliptical discs and lateral keels but no webbing. Dorsal skin is shagreened with minute, low, round tubercles; ventral skin is granular. The coloration is variable. The dorsum can be brown medially, turning pale tan laterally onto flanks and to tip of snout, or gray to tan or medium brown with faint darker markings, or uniformly yellowish olive. The inguinal region and the posterior surfaces of the thighs have bright yellow to orange spots that are hidden when the animal is sitting. The venter is transparent yellow to yellowish white. The large subgular vocal sac in males is bright yellow.

== Habitat and conservation ==
Pristimantis ceuthospilus occurs in tropical low montane and montane forests at elevations of 1,082–2,870 m (3,550–9,416 ft) above sea level. Calling male have been found on leaves and stems of herbaceous vegetation slightly above the ground along a road cut in cloud forest. Both males and females have been found in bromeliads by day. Development is direct (i.e., there is no free-living larval stage).

It is threatened by habitat loss caused by agriculture, livestock ranching, and selective logging. It probably occurs in the Salitral-Huarmaca Regional Conservation Area.
