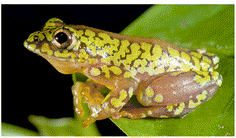

Conservation status
- Vulnerable (IUCN 3.1)

Scientific classification
- Kingdom: Animalia
- Phylum: Chordata
- Class: Amphibia
- Order: Anura
- Family: Hyperoliidae
- Genus: Hyperolius
- Species: H. minutissimus

Binomial name
- Hyperolius minutissimus Schiøtz, 1975

= Hyperolius minutissimus =

Species of frog

Hyperolius minutissimus is a species of frog in the family Hyperoliidae. Its common names are tiny reed frog and dwarf reed frog. It is endemic to Tanzania and known from the Udzungwa Mountains and from near Njombe in the Southern Highlands.

== Taxonomy ==
Hyperolius minutissimus belongs to the "East African spiny-throated reed frog complex", consisting of five other species: Hyperolius spinigularis, Hyperolius tanneri, Hyperolius burgessi, Hyperolius davenporti, and Hyperolius ukwiva. Based on molecular genetic data, its closest relative is H. ukwiva from the Rubeho Mountains, Tanzania. The form a sister group to a group consisting of the remaining four species in this complex.

== Description ==
Males measure 12–17 mm (0.47–0.67 in) and females 18–24 mm (0.71–0.94 in) in snout–vent length; Loader and colleagues report larger male sizes (19–23 mm) from the Udzungwa Mountains, but no data on females.

The dorsum is brown and has light canthal and dorsolateral lines. Some females, however, have broad light canthal and irregular dorsolateral stripes, as well as spots on the dorsum. The pupil is horizontal. Males have a gular flap and black dotted asperities distributed on anterior and mid-region of the gular flap.

== Habitat and conservation ==
The species' natural habitats are open, windswept, montane grasslands in forested areas at elevations of 1,600–2,010 m (5,250–6,590 ft) above sea level. It has also been found in pastureland and heard calling by a road near a large pine plantation. Breeding takes place in shallow, temporary swamps.

Hyperolius minutissimus is easy to overlook, so although it is rarely seen, it might not be quite so rare. Nevertheless, it is threatened by habitat loss (draining of its breeding habitat for agricultural activities, afforestation, agricultural expansion, fire, and expanding human settlements). It has not been recorded in the Udzungwa Mountains National Park. However, it occurs in the Udzungwa Scarp Forest, which was, as of 2014, "soon to be a nature reserve". It has not been recorded in the Southern Highlands since the initial species description in 1975.
