= Pristimantis boconoensis =

Conservation status
- Vulnerable (IUCN 3.1)

Scientific classification
- Kingdom: Animalia
- Phylum: Chordata
- Class: Amphibia
- Order: Anura
- Clade: Brachycephaloidea
- Family: Craugastoridae
- Genus: Pristimantis
- Species: P. boconoensis

Binomial name
- Pristimantis boconoensis (Rivero & Mayorga, 1973)

Synonyms
- Eleutherodactylus boconoensis Rivero and Mayorga, 1973

Species of frog

Pristimantis boconoensis is a species of frog in the family Strabomantidae. It is endemic to Venezuela. Its natural habitats are tropical moist montane forests and high-altitude grassland. It is threatened by habitat loss.
