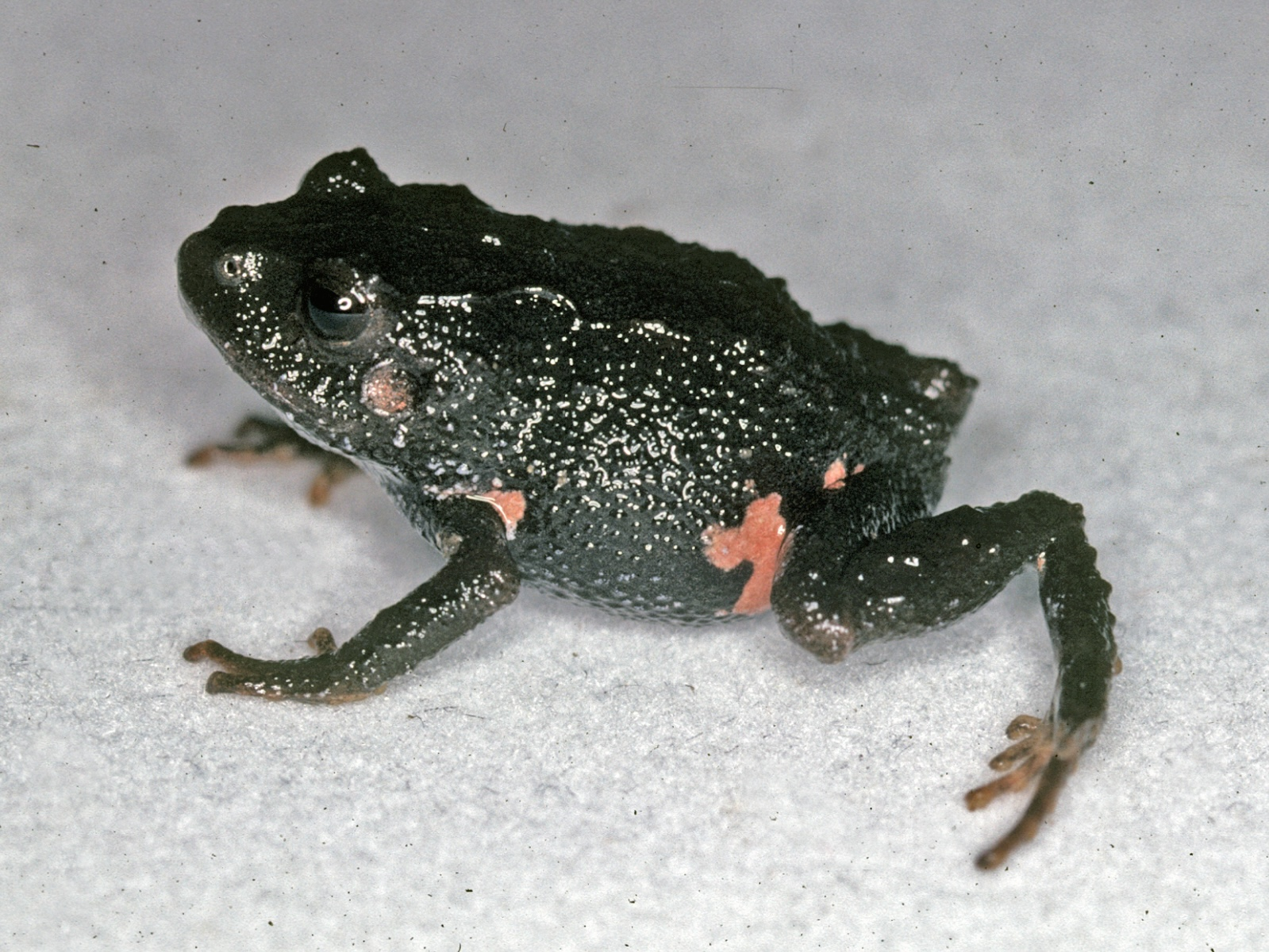
- Pristimantis myersi

Conservation status
- Least Concern (IUCN 3.1)

Scientific classification
- Kingdom: Animalia
- Phylum: Chordata
- Class: Amphibia
- Order: Anura
- Clade: Brachycephaloidea
- Family: Craugastoridae
- Genus: Pristimantis
- Subgenus: Pristimantis
- Species: P. myersi

Binomial name
- Pristimantis myersi (Goin and Cochran, 1963)

Synonyms
- Trachyphrynus myersi Goin and Cochran, 1963; Eleutherodactylus myersi (Goin and Cochran, 1963)

= Pristimantis myersi =

Species of frog

Pristimantis myersi, also known as Myers' robber frog, is a species of frog in the family Strabomantidae. It is found in the Andes of southern Colombia and northern Ecuador. Its natural habitats are páramos, sub-páramos, and upper Andean forests at elevations of 2,800–3,470 m (9,190–11,380 ft) above sea level.
