= Pristimantis rosadoi =

Conservation status
- Vulnerable (IUCN 3.1)

Scientific classification
- Kingdom: Animalia
- Phylum: Chordata
- Class: Amphibia
- Order: Anura
- Family: Strabomantidae
- Genus: Pristimantis
- Subgenus: Hypodictyon
- Species: P. rosadoi

Binomial name
- Pristimantis rosadoi (Flores, 1988)

Synonyms
- Eleutherodactylus rosadoi Flores, 1988

Species of frog

Pristimantis rosadoi is a species of frog in the family Strabomantidae. It is found in north-western Ecuador in Carchi, Esmeraldas, and Pichincha provinces, and in the adjacent Colombia in the Nariño Department as well as on the Gorgona Island; there is some doubt about the identity of the Gorgona Island specimens, while the checklist of Colombian amphibians only mentions the Gorgona record. The specific name rosadoi honors José P. O. Rosado, herpetologist at the Museum of Comparative Zoology, and also alludes to similarity of this species to Pristimantis roseus. Common name Rosado's robber frog has been proposed for it.

== Description ==
Adult males measure 17–19 mm (0.7–0.7 in) and adult females 22–27 mm (0.9–1.1 in) in snout–vent length (SVL). The upper eyelid bears 1–2 conical tubercles, but these may not be obvious in some individuals. The tympanum is prominent. The snout is subacuminate in dorsal view and rounded in profile; there is a small papilla at its tip. The fingers bear broad discs and weakly crenulated lateral fringes. The toes bear narrow lateral fringes. Dorsal skin bears many small tubercles. Dorsal coloration is tan to reddish tan with dark brown markings.

=== Reproduction ===
A 24-mm SVL female, amplexed with a 17-mm male, had 52 mature eggs in her oviduct. Development is presumed to be direct (i.e, there is no free-living larval stage).

== Habitat and conservation ==
Pristimantis rosadoi occurs in primary and secondary lowland forest at elevations up to 800 m (2,600 ft) above sea level. It is often found near streams. It is nocturnal, and specimens have been found at night on low vegetation. It does not occur in open areas. It is not known where the eggs are deposited.

Pristimantis rosadoi is an uncommon species. Threats to it likely include agricultural development, logging, human settlement, and pollution resulting from the spraying of illegal crops. It is found in the Cotacachi Cayapas Ecological Reserve (Ecuador) and Gorgona National Natural Park (Colombia).
