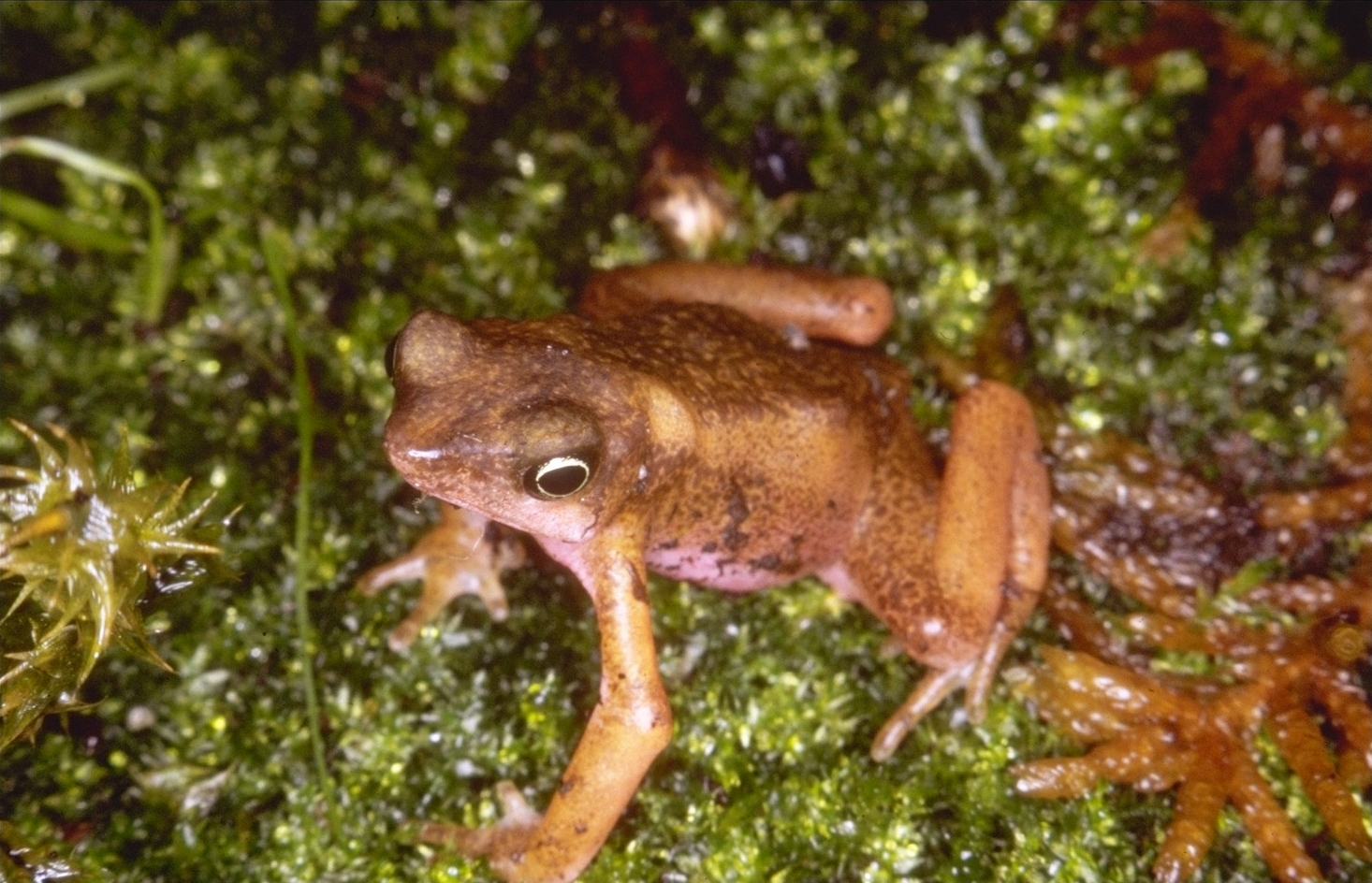

Conservation status
- Vulnerable (IUCN 3.1)

Scientific classification
- Kingdom: Animalia
- Phylum: Chordata
- Class: Amphibia
- Order: Anura
- Family: Bufonidae
- Genus: Atelopus
- Species: A. flavescens

Binomial name
- Atelopus flavescens Duméril and Bibron, 1841

Synonyms
- Atelopus vermiculatus McDiarmid, 1973

= Cayenne stubfoot toad =

Species of amphibian

The Cayenne stubfoot toad (Atelopus flavescens), known in French as atélope jaunâtre, is a species of toad in the family Bufonidae found in northeastern French Guiana and in the adjacent Brazilian state Amapá. Its natural habitats are lowland primary forest where it is known from near fast-flowing, small streams. It is locally common. There are no major threats at present.
