= Patricia Burrowes =

American biologist and herpetologist

- Born: 1961 (age 64–65)
- Education: University of Kansas (MA, PhD)
- Scientific career
- Fields: Herpetology, Disease ecology
- Workplaces: University of Puerto Rico at Cayey; University of Puerto Rico, Río Piedras Campus
- Thesis: The reproductive biology and population genetics of the cave-dwelling Puerto Rican frog, Eleutherodactylus cooki (1997)
- Doctoral advisor: William E. Duellman

Patricia A. Burrowes Gomez (born 1961) is an American herpetologist. She is a retired professor of biology from the University of Puerto Rico, Río Piedras Campus where she served as principal investigator of the Amphibian Disease Ecology Lab. Burrowes specializes in changes in amphibian population dynamics as a response to stressors of the Anthropocene, especially emergent infectious diseases. She is now an adjunct researcher at the National Museum of Natural History, CSIC, Madrid, Spain.

== Early life and education ==
Burrowes was born in 1961. In 1986, during her graduate studies, Burrowes and her doctoral advisor William E. Duellman collected specimens in Colombia and co-wrote A new species of marsupial frog (Hylidae: Gastrotheca) from the Andes of Southern Colombia. She completed a M.A. in systematics and ecology in 1987 at University of Kansas. Her graduate thesis was titled An ecological study of a cloud forest herpetofauna in southern Columbia. Burrowes earned a Ph.D. in ecology and systematics in 1997 at University of Kansas. Her 1997 dissertation was titled The reproductive biology and population genetics of the cave-dwelling Puerto Rican frog, Eleutherodactylus cooki.

== Career and research ==
In 1986, Burrowes began working with amphibians in Colombia, later she continued research on the amphibians of Puerto Rico but also collaborated in studies in other tropical countries. She was a professor in the biology department at the University of Puerto Rico, Río Piedras Campus where she served as principal investigator of the Amphibian Disease Ecology Lab. In April 2019, Burrowes as part of a team of researchers published a study in Science about a mycosis causing a dramatic population decrease in at least 501 species of amphibians.
