= John Douglas Lynch =

American professor and herpetologist

- Born: July 30, 1942; Iowa, United States
- Education: University of Illinois Urbana-Champaign; University of Kansas
- Known for: Research on neotropical frogs, taxonomy of Pristimantis, Eleutherodactylus, and Strabomantis
- Scientific career
- Fields: Herpetology
- Workplaces: University of Nebraska–Lincoln; Universidad Nacional de Colombia
- Doctoral advisor: William Edward Duellman
- Author abbrev. (zoology): Lynch

John Douglas Lynch (born July 30, 1942) is an American herpetologist. His research focuses on the neotropical herpetofauna.

== Biography ==
Lynch received his Bachelor of Science in Zoology in 1964 and his Master of Science in Zoology in 1965 at the University of Illinois Urbana-Champaign. As part of his master's degree, he conducted research in Mexico in 1964 studying the frog genus Eleutherodactylus. He then enrolled at the University of Kansas, where he studied zoology under William Edward Duellman. In 1967, he went on his first expedition to Ecuador, where he collected frogs of the genus Eleutherodactylus and members of the family Centrolenidae (glass frogs). He earned his Ph.D. in 1969 with the dissertation Evolutionary relationships and osteology of the frog family Leptodactylidae.

During an expedition in 1980 with María Cristina Ardila Robayo and Pedro Ruiz in the highlands of the Colombian departments of Cauca and Huila, he discovered more than 20 new frog species. From 1969 to 1997, Lynch was a professor at the University of Nebraska–Lincoln. In 1997, he became an associate professor and curator of herpetology at the Instituto de Ciencias Naturales of the Universidad Nacional de Colombia. Since 1999, he has lived in Colombia.

In the summer of 2000, he was among a group of scientists briefly kidnapped by the Colombian guerrilla organization ELN.

Lynch has participated in the scientific descriptions of more than 200 frog species, including many taxa in the genera Eleutherodactylus, Pristimantis and Strabomantis.

Lynch has a son and a daughter.

== Eponyms ==
Several taxa have been named in honor of John Douglas Lynch, including Atelopus lynchi, Rhaebo lynchi, Centrolene lynchi, Colostethus lynchi, Hyloscirtus lynchi, Noblella lynchi, and Pristimantis lynchi, as well as the genera Lynchophrys and Lynchius. The specific epithet of the salamander Pseudoeurycea lynchi refers to the zoologist James Francis Lynch.
