= Oreobates zongoensis =

Conservation status
- Critically Endangered (IUCN 3.1)

Scientific classification
- Kingdom: Animalia
- Phylum: Chordata
- Class: Amphibia
- Order: Anura
- Family: Strabomantidae
- Genus: Oreobates
- Species: O. zongoensis

Binomial name
- Oreobates zongoensis (Reichle and Köhler, 1997)

Synonyms
- Eleutherodactylus zongoensis Reichle and Köhler, 1997

Species of frog

Oreobates zongoensis is a species of frog in the family Strabomantidae. It is endemic to Bolivia from Zongo Valley, in Pedro Domingo Murillo Province.

== Description ==
The holotype, an adult male, measures 29 mm (1.1 in) in snout–vent length. The head is slightly wider than the body and slightly wider than it is long. The snout is subacuminate. The canthus rostralis is evident. The tympanum is visible. Skin of head, dorsum, flanks, and hind limbs strongly and uniformly tuberculate, while skin of forelimbs and ventral surfaces is smooth. The fingers and toes have small discs but no webbing or lateral fringes. The head, dorsum, and flanks are dark pinkish brown, without any markings. The upper surfaces of forelimbs and posterior hind limbs are purple to brown, while the chest and ventral sides of forelimbs pinkish and the venter and ventral sides of hind limbs are pinkish brown. The iris is orange and has fine, black reticulum.

== Taxonomy ==
A 2021 phylogenomic analysis placed O. zongoensis in the southern clade of the genus Oreobates, grouping it genetically close to species from Bolivia and Argentina such as Oreobates sanctaecrucis, Oreobates choristolemma, and Oreobates sanctaecrucis, among others.

== Habitat and conservation ==
Oreobates zongoensis is only known from the Zongo Valley in Pedro Domingo Murillo Province, Bolivia

Oreobates zongoensis is only known from Zongo Valley. The holotype was collected during daytime in a small cavity under a large stone in disturbed montane rainforest at elevation of 1,250 m (4,100 ft) above sea level. The type locality has been entirely destroyed with the construction of a hydroelectric power plant. In 2016, several more were discovered in an intact forest patch in the Zongo Valley.
