= Amarakaeri =

Amarakaeri may refer to:

- Amarakaeri people, an ethnic group of Peru
- Amarakaeri language, a language of Peru
- Oreobates amarakaeri, a species of frog in Peru named after the Amarakaeri people
