= Liolaemus qalaywa =

Scientific classification
- Kingdom: Animalia
- Phylum: Chordata
- Class: Reptilia
- Order: Squamata
- Suborder: Iguania
- Family: Liolaemidae
- Genus: Liolaemus
- Species: L. qalaywa

Binomial name
- Liolaemus qalaywa Chaparro, Quiroz, Mamani, Gutiérrez, Condori, De la Riva, Herrera-Juárez, Cerdeña, Arapa, & Abdala, 2020

Species of lizard

Liolaemus qalaywa is a species of lizard in the family Iguanidae. It is endemic to Peru.
