= Oreobates berdemenos =

Conservation status
- Vulnerable (IUCN 3.1)

Scientific classification
- Kingdom: Animalia
- Phylum: Chordata
- Class: Amphibia
- Order: Anura
- Family: Strabomantidae
- Genus: Oreobates
- Species: O. berdemenos

Binomial name
- Oreobates berdemenos Pereyra, Cardozo, J. Baldo, & D. Baldo, 2014

Species of frog

Oreobates berdemenos is a species of frog in the genus Oreobates in the family Craugastoridae. It is endemic to the forests of the Southern Andean Yungas ecoregion in northwestern Argentina.

== Distribution and habitat ==
This species inhabits the mountain forests in the Southern Andean Yungas ecoregion. It is found in the province of Jujuy, in northwestern Argentina.

== Taxonomy ==
The species was originally described in 2014 by a team of research fellows and investigators from the Argentine National Scientific and Technical Research Council (CONICET).

The first specimens were captured by Y. Arzamendia and J. Baldo in Abra Colorada, in Ledesma Department, in Jujuy. This location is along the route in Valle Grande Department that connects Calilegua National Park and San Francisco, Jujuy. Several paratypes and referred specimens were found in museum collections.

== Characteristics ==
This species is similar to others in the genus Oreobates, of which O. barituensis and O. discoidalis also live in the forests of the Southern Andean Yungas.

Oreobates berdemenos was identified by a combination of morphological characteristics and supported by molecular evidence (DNA sequences), both in terms of genetic distance and phylogenetic analysis.

The two other Argentine species in the genus are identifiable due to their abdominal (or disc-like) folds, which O. berdemenos lacks. They have different tympanums and markings, among other more subtle differences.

As a member of the clade Terrarana, it exhibits direct development; adult females lay eggs that metamorphose into juveniles, an atypical feature in amphibians, which commonly go through an intermediate tadpole stage.
