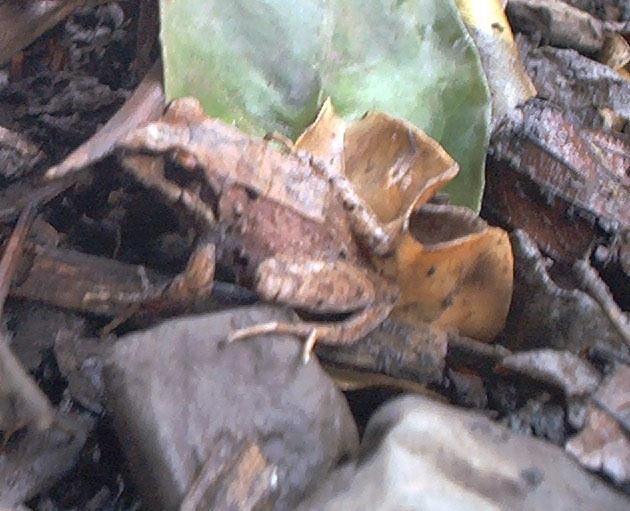
- Yunganastes bisignatus

Scientific classification
- Kingdom: Animalia
- Phylum: Chordata
- Class: Amphibia
- Order: Anura
- Family: Strabomantidae
- Subfamily: Pristimantinae
- Genus: Yunganastes; Padial, Castroviejo-Fisher, Köhler, Domic, and De la Riva, 2007

Type species
- Eleutherodactylus pluvicanorus De la Riva and Lynch, 1997

Species
- 5 (see text)

= Yunganastes =

Genus of amphibians

Yunganastes is a small genus of frogs in the family Strabomantidae found in southern Peru and central to northern Bolivia. They were formerly placed in the genus Eleutherodactylus as the "Eleutherodactylus fraudator group", subsequently moved to Pristimantis, before becoming recognized as a separate subgenus, and finally, a genus. Its sister taxon is the genus Pristimantis. Yunganastes are endemic to the cloud forests and humid montane forests of the Cordillera Oriental of the Andes in Bolivia and southern Peru.

== Etymology ==
The generic name Yunganastes is derived from yunga, the humid forests of the Andean valleys, and the Greek nastes for "dweller". This refers to the typical habitat of frogs in this genus.

== Description ==
Yunganastes are robust-bodied and moderate to medium-sized frogs. Males can reach 52 mm (2.0 in) and females 63 mm (2.5 in) in snout–vent length. The limbs are moderately long. The head is as wide or wider than the body; the snout is short. The tympanum is visible, and the supra-tympanic fold is well-developed. The toes have rudimentary or no webbing. Males have a large vocal sac. The male advertisement call is single melodic whistle with frequency modulation and relatively low dominant frequency of about 1200–1500 Hz.

== Species ==
There are five species:

- Yunganastes ashkapara (Köhler, 2000)
- Yunganastes bisignatus (Werner, 1899)
- Yunganastes fraudator (Lynch and McDiarmid, 1987)
- Yunganastes mercedesae (Lynch and McDiarmid, 1987)
- Yunganastes pluvicanorus (De la Riva and Lynch, 1997)
