= Proctoporus unsaacae =

Conservation status
- Least Concern (IUCN 3.1)

Scientific classification
- Kingdom: Animalia
- Phylum: Chordata
- Class: Reptilia
- Order: Squamata
- Family: Gymnophthalmidae
- Genus: Proctoporus
- Species: P. unsaacae

Binomial name
- Proctoporus unsaacae Doan & Castoe, 2003

Species of lizard

Proctoporus unsaacae is a species of lizard in the family Gymnophthalmidae. The species is endemic to Peru.

== Etymology ==
The specific name, unsaacae, is in honor of the herpetological research group at the Universidad Nacional de San Antonio Abad de Cusco (UNSAAC).

== Geographic range ==
P. unsaacae is found in the Department of Cuzco, Peru.

== Habitat ==
The preferred natural habitat of P. unsaacae is shrubland, at altitudes of 3,152–3,700 m (10,341–12,139 ft).

== Reproduction ==
P. unsaacae is oviparous.
