= Oreobates pereger =

Conservation status
- Endangered (IUCN 3.1)

Scientific classification
- Kingdom: Animalia
- Phylum: Chordata
- Class: Amphibia
- Order: Anura
- Family: Strabomantidae
- Genus: Oreobates
- Species: O. pereger

Binomial name
- Oreobates pereger (Lynch, 1975)

Synonyms
- Phrynopus pereger Lynch, 1975; Eleutherodactylus pereger (Lynch, 1975)

Species of frog

Oreobates pereger, also known as the Ayacucho Andes frog, is a species of frog in the family Strabomantidae. It is endemic to Peru where it is known from the eastern slopes of the Cordillera Oriental and Cordillera Vilcabamba mountain ranges.

== Description ==
Male Oreobates pereger grow to a snout–vent length of 21–25 mm (0.83–0.98 in) and females to 24–32 mm (0.94–1.26 in). The skin of dorsum and venter is smooth and with dark gray, reddish-brown, or dark gray-brown ground colour. The flanks are yellowish brown to dull yellow with an orange suffusion ventrally.

Eggs are large and yellow, up to 4 mm (0.16 in) in diameter. Fecundity is about 18–20.

== Habitat and conservation ==
Oreobates pereger is a terrestrial frog inhabiting montane cloud forests at elevations of 1,600–2,900 m (5,200–9,500 ft) above sea level. It is threatened by habitat loss caused by agricultural expansion, wood collecting, and human settlement.
