= Proctoporus pachyurus =

Conservation status
- Near Threatened (IUCN 3.1)

Scientific classification
- Kingdom: Animalia
- Phylum: Chordata
- Class: Reptilia
- Order: Squamata
- Family: Gymnophthalmidae
- Genus: Proctoporus
- Species: P. pachyurus

Binomial name
- Proctoporus pachyurus Tschudi, 1845

Species of lizard

Proctoporus pachyurus, Tschudi's lightbulb lizard, is a species of lizard in the family Gymnophthalmidae. It is endemic to Peru.
