= Proctoporus laudahnae =

Conservation status
- Data Deficient (IUCN 3.1)

Scientific classification
- Kingdom: Animalia
- Phylum: Chordata
- Class: Reptilia
- Order: Squamata
- Family: Gymnophthalmidae
- Genus: Proctoporus
- Species: P. laudahnae

Binomial name
- Proctoporus laudahnae G. Köhler & Lehr, 2004

Synonyms
- Riama laudahnae (G. Köhler & Lehr, 2004)

Species of lizard

Proctoporus laudahnae is a species of lizard in the family Gymnophthalmidae. The species is endemic to Peru.

== Etymology ==
The specific name, laudahnae, is in honor of Monika Laudahn, who is a technician in the Herpetology Department at the Naturmuseum Senckenberg in Frankfurt am Main, Germany.

== Geographic range ==
P. laudahnae is found in central Peru, in the Department of Huánuco.

== Habitat ==
The preferred natural habitat of P. laudahnae is forest, at altitudes around 3,000 m (9,800 ft).

== Behavior ==
P. laudahnae is terrestrial.

== Reproduction ==
P. laudahnae is oviparous.
