= Yunganastes mercedesae =

Conservation status
- Least Concern (IUCN 3.1)

Scientific classification
- Kingdom: Animalia
- Phylum: Chordata
- Class: Amphibia
- Order: Anura
- Clade: Brachycephaloidea
- Family: Craugastoridae
- Genus: Yunganastes
- Species: Y. mercedesae

Binomial name
- Yunganastes mercedesae (Lynch and McDiarmid, 1987)

Synonyms
- Eleutherodactylus mercedesae Lynch and McDiarmid, 1987; Pristimantis mercedesae (Lynch and McDiarmid, 1987)

Species of amphibian

Yunganastes mercedesae is a species of frog in the family Strabomantidae. It is found in Bolivia and southern Peru. It is sometimes known as Mercedes' robber frog. It is named after Mercedes S. Foster, who collected the holotype and was acknowledged for her herpetological collection efforts in South America.

== Description ==
Yunganastes mercedesae is a beautiful frog with a striking colour pattern: the dorsum is medium brown with irregular, light green splotches and some black marks, and black eyestripe and lip marks. It is still known from relatively few individuals. Based on three adult males and two adult females, males measure 42–52 mm (1.7–2.0 in) in snout–vent length, whereas females are much larger at 62–63 mm (2.4–2.5 in) SVL.

== Habitat ==
Yunganastes mercedesae is a rare frog inhabiting Andean cloud forest at moderate elevations (1400–1950 m).
