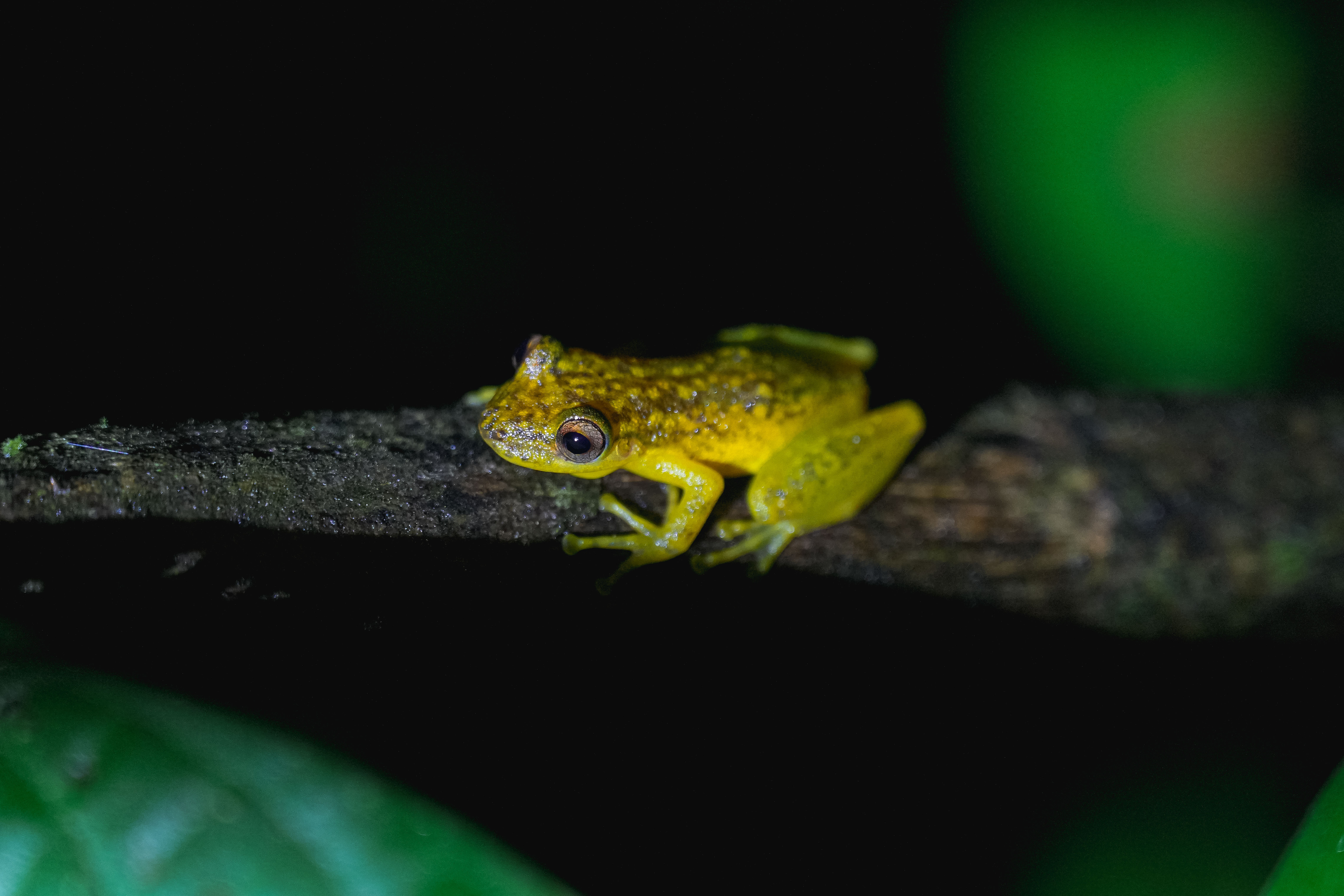

Conservation status
- Least Concern (IUCN 3.1)

Scientific classification
- Kingdom: Animalia
- Phylum: Chordata
- Class: Amphibia
- Order: Anura
- Family: Hylidae
- Genus: Scinax
- Species: S. chiquitanus

Binomial name
- Scinax chiquitanus (De la Riva, 1990)

Synonyms
- Ololygon chiquitana De la Riva, 1990 "1989"; Scinax chiquitana (De la Riva, 1990)

= Scinax chiquitanus =

Species of frog

Scinax chiquitanus is a species of frog in the family Hylidae. It is known from Amazonian Bolivia and from Department of Madre de Dios in Peru. The Peruvian populations might represent a distinct species.

== Description ==
Adult males measure 28–33 mm (1.1–1.3 in) and adult females 32–36 mm (1.3–1.4 in) in snout–vent length. The snout is rounded. The tympanum is distinct. Skin is smooth to very finely shagreened. Both sexes are dark brown by day, whereas at night, males are yellowish gold to orange and females are beige or pale brown. The coloration is mostly uniform but the flanks may have small dark spots and the posterior surfaces of the thighs may have a dark brown longitudinal stripe or lightly pigmented spots. The iris is pale gold.

The male advertisement call is a short rattling "buzz" consisting of a series of notes lasting 0.08–0.10 seconds each and repeated at a rate of 20–45 notes per minute. The dominant frequency is about 2000 Hz.

== Habitat and conservation ==
Scinax chiquitanus occurs in Amazonian rainforest and wet forest in transition to lowlands at elevations below 450 m (1,480 ft). It is nocturnal and arboreal. Males call on aquatic vegetation or on emerging bushes from temporary ponds, its breeding habitat.

Scinax chiquitanus is a common species. It can locally suffer from habitat loss but this does not constitute a major threat. It is present in a number of protected areas.
