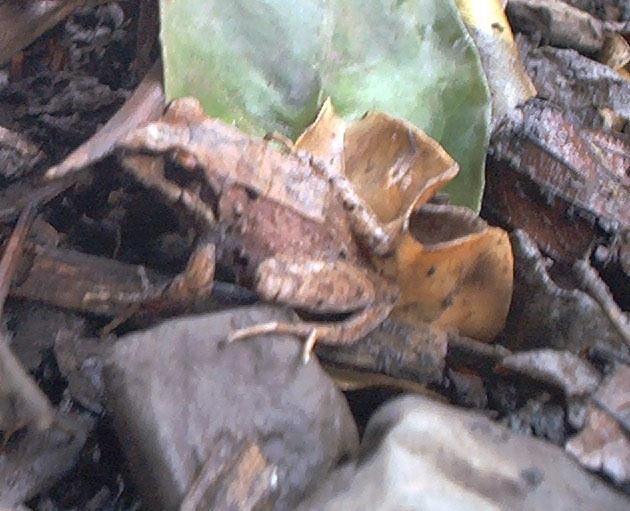

Conservation status
- Endangered (IUCN 3.1)

Scientific classification
- Kingdom: Animalia
- Phylum: Chordata
- Class: Amphibia
- Order: Anura
- Family: Strabomantidae
- Genus: Yunganastes
- Species: Y. bisignatus

Binomial name
- Yunganastes bisignatus (Werner, 1899)

Synonyms
- Hylodes gollmeri var. bisignata Werner, 1899; Eleutherodactylus bisignatus (Werner, 1899); Pristimantis bisignatus (Werner, 1899)

= Yunganastes bisignatus =

Species of frog

Yunganastes bisignatus is a species of frog in the family Strabomantidae. It is endemic to the La Paz Department, Bolivia, and known from between the Inquisivi and Nor Yungas Provinces. It has been considered synonym of Pristimantis fenestratus but is now treated as valid species.

== Description ==
Adult males measure 28–35 mm (1.1–1.4 in) and adult females, based on a single specimen, 47 mm (1.9 in) in snout–vent length. The head is wider than it is long. The snout is short. The tympanum is visible but partly obscured by the prominent supratympanic fold. The fingers and toes have weakly to moderately enlarged discs but no lateral fringes nor webbing. The dorsum is dark reddish-brown; the flanks are lighter with cream ground color. There are various dark brown markings, including a narrow dark brown band running from the tip of snout to the eye along canthus. The ventral surfaces are cream, with dense, fine grey mottling on the throat.

== Habitat and conservation ==
Yunganastes bisignatus inhabits tropical moist montane forests at elevations of 1,850–2,700 m (6,070–8,860 ft) above sea level. It is diurnal. Males call from low positions (0.3–0.6 m (1–2 ft) above the ground) on tree trunks and bushes at night, and provided that weather is suitably foggy and rainy, during the day.

Yunganastes bisignatus is abundant at its type locality but its range is small and it is threatened by habitat loss. It occurs in the Cotapata National Park and Integrated Management Natural Area.
