= Oreobates saxatilis =

Conservation status
- Least Concern (IUCN 3.1)

Scientific classification
- Kingdom: Animalia
- Phylum: Chordata
- Class: Amphibia
- Order: Anura
- Family: Strabomantidae
- Genus: Oreobates
- Species: O. saxatilis

Binomial name
- Oreobates saxatilis (Duellman, 1990)

Synonyms
- Ischnocnema saxatilis Duellman, 1990

Species of frog

Oreobates saxatilis, also known as Tarapoto big-headed frog, is a species of frog in the family Strabomantidae. It is endemic to Peru and known from near its type locality near Tarapoto (San Martín Province) as well as from the Río Tambo District in the Satipo Province, Panguana in the Puerto Inca Province, and Río Kimbiri in the La Convención Province.

== Description ==
Oreobates saxatilis are large-sized among the Oreobates species; adults measure 45–50 mm (1.8–2.0 in) in snout–vent length. The head is large and wider than long; the snout is short. The tympanum is distinct; the supra-tympanic fold is weak and short. The fingers and toes are long and slender and have no lateral fringes nor keels. Skin is granular, with round keratinized granules and small (only some slightly enlarged), sparse, low, flat warts. The venter is smooth. The dorsum is greyish brown with darker brown markings. The belly is immaculate.

== Taxonomy ==
A 2021 study found that O. saxatilis and the species Oreobates quixensis are polyphyletic. Genetic analysis showed that some individuals of O. saxatilis were more closely related to O. quixensis than to other members of their own species, suggesting a complex evolutionary history involving recent divergence or hybridization between these two lineages.

== Habitat and conservation ==
The species was originally known from lowland tropical forest as well as from rocky streambeds in ravines on mountain slopes at elevations of 360–600 m (1,180–1,970 ft) above sea level, although further sampling has extended its altitudinal range to 233–1,086 m (764–3,563 ft). In 2018 it was assessed as "Least Concern" by the International Union for Conservation of Nature (IUCN).
