= Teresa Camacho Badani =

Bolivian biologist

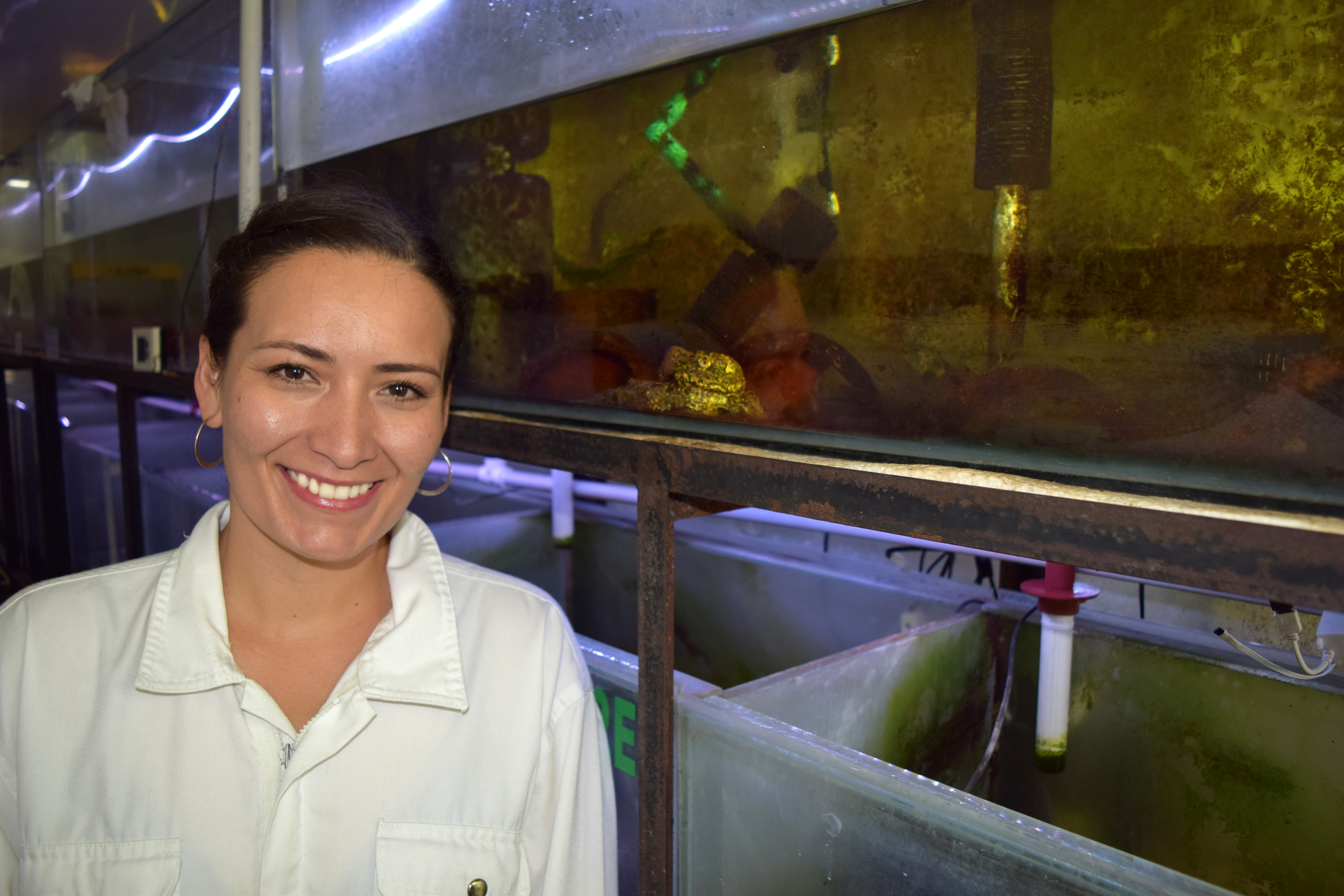
- Born: 22 February 1984 (age 42); Cochabamba, Bolivia
- Education: Universidad Mayor de San Simón; Pontifical University of Ecuador
- Occupation: Biologist
- Known for: Frog conservation

Teresa Camacho Badani (Cochabamba, 22 February 1984) is a Bolivian biologist who is the chief of herpetology at the Museo de Historia Natural Alcide d’Orbigny in Cochabamba. She is known for her work in preserving the Sehuencas water frog and the Titicaca water frog.

== Education ==
Camacho Badani started working with amphibians as an undergraduate at Universidad Mayor de San Simon, then got her Master's degree in Conservation Biology at Pontifical University of Ecuador.

== Career ==
At the Museo de Historia Natural Alcide d'Orbigny (MHNC), she leads the K'ayra Center, which houses and breeds endangered Bolivian frogs. In 2018, the museum used a Match.com profile for its solitary Senhuencas water frog, "Romeo," to raise awareness of the species' plight and funds for an expedition to find him a mate. Romeo had been found in 2009 by Camacho Badani, and was thought to possibly be the last of his species. Camacho Badani led the resulting expedition into a Bolivian cloud forest and found a suitable female Senhuencas water frog, which was named "Juliet," along with another female and three males.

=== Romeo the frog ===
In 2018 Camacho Badani was one of the promoters of a campaign to finance an expedition in search of a female of the species Telmatobius yuracare to form the first couple of this species as part of a conservation and breeding plan with the purpose of preventing its extinction. The team led by Camacho Badani was also made up of veterinarian Ricardo Zurita Urgarte, Sophia Barrón Lavayen, head of captive breeding at the K'ayra Center; and researcher Stephane Knoll. In January 2019 the expedition announced that it had achieved the collection and transfer of five specimens of the species to the breeding center.

Since 2009, with the discovery by biologists Rodrigo Aguayo and Oliver Quinteros, there had been a male specimen of the Sehuencas frog, the only one of its kind, but this was insufficient to guarantee its preservation, so it began a fundraising campaign to finance an expedition to the Bolivian cloud forest in Carrasco National Park. The image of the campaign was a frog named Romeo. The campaign was carried out in 2018 under the #Match4Romeo label and was supported by the Global Wildlife Conservation, and raised 25,000 to finance the expedition. After the discovery of new specimens, a female was chosen, since then called Julieta, found near a waterfall on 8 December 2018, to promote mating and continue with the conservation plan for the species.

=== The giant frog of Lake Titicaca ===
As part of the team at the K'ayra Center for Research and Conservation of Endangered Amphibians in Bolivia, Camacho Badani works for the conservation of the giant frog of Lake Titicaca, a frog threatened by pollution and illegal exploitation. With her team at MHNC, Camacho Badani has done outreach with Carrasco National Park and local schools. Other species she and the K'ayra Center work with include the amphibians Rhinella justinianoi (a toad) and Nymphargus bejaranoi (Bolivian Cochran frog).

In early 2019 (prior to the breeding at several European institutions and not counting those at the breeding center in Bolivia), there were about 3,000 Titicaca water frogs at the breeding center in Peru, and 250 in zoos in North America and Europe. Captives have lived for up to 20 years

In early 2022, Camacho Badani was among others speaking out against the city of Cochabamba's plans to replace MHNC with a convention center.

== Awards and honors ==
- Future Leader Award by Amphibian Survival Alliance (2019)
- Recognized with the Manuela Gandarilla al Mérito Ecológico Distinction for her work by the city of Cochabamba (2019)
- Named (along with K'ayra Center) a Disney Conservation Hero by Disney Conservation Fund (2020)
