= Proctoporus xestus =

Conservation status
- Least Concern (IUCN 3.1)

Scientific classification
- Kingdom: Animalia
- Phylum: Chordata
- Class: Reptilia
- Order: Squamata
- Family: Gymnophthalmidae
- Genus: Proctoporus
- Species: P. xestus

Binomial name
- Proctoporus xestus (Uzzell, 1969)

Synonyms
- Opipeuter xestus Uzzell, 1969; Proctoporus xestus — Goicoechea et al., 2012

Species of lizard

Proctoporus xestus, or the river teiid, is a species of lizard in the family Gymnophthalmidae. The species is endemic to South America.

== Geographic range ==
P. xestus occurs from central Peru to Bolivia (Chuquisaca, Cochabamba, and Santa Cruz departments) and northern Argentina (Jujuy, and Salta provinces).

== Habitat ==
The preferred natural habitats of P. xestus are Yungas forest and wet montane grassland, at elevations of 1,000–3,600 m (3,300–11,800 ft) above sea level.

== Description ==
P. xestus may attain a snout-to-vent length (SVL) of 5.8 cm (2.3 in). The tail length is almost twice the SVL.

== Reproduction ==
P. xestus is oviparous.

== Taxonomy ==
P. xestus is the type species of the genus Opipeuter Uzzell, 1969, now synonymized with Proctoporus.
