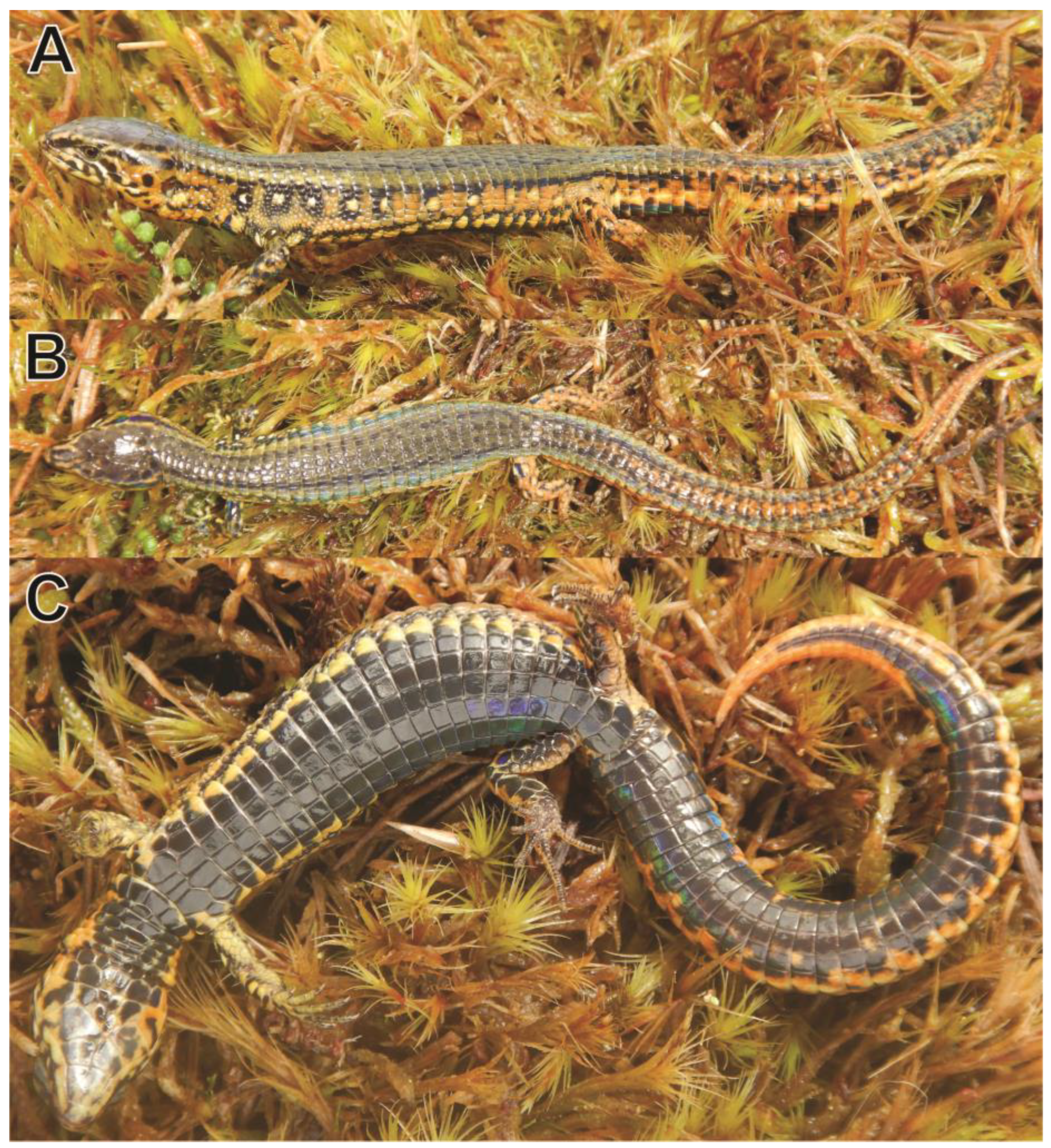
- Proctoporus titans

Scientific classification
- Kingdom: Animalia
- Phylum: Chordata
- Class: Reptilia
- Order: Squamata
- Family: Gymnophthalmidae
- Genus: Proctoporus
- Species: P. titans

Binomial name
- Proctoporus titans Lehr, Cusi, Fernandez, Vera & Catenazzi, 2022

= Proctoporus titans =

Species of lizard

Proctoporus titans is a species of lizard in the family Gymnophthalmidae. It is endemic to Peru.
