= Proctoporus =

Scientific classification
- Kingdom: Animalia
- Phylum: Chordata
- Class: Reptilia
- Order: Squamata
- Family: Gymnophthalmidae
- Tribe: Cercosaurini
- Genus: Proctoporus; Tschudi, 1845

Synonyms
- Opipeuter Uzzell, 1969, non Fortey, 1974 (a trilobite)

Genus of lizards

Proctoporus is a genus of medium-sized lizards (snout-vent length between 2.7 centimetres or 1.1 inches and 7.8 centimetres or 3.1 inches) assigned to the family Gymnophthalmidae. Species in the genus Proctoporus occur in Yungas forests and wet montane grasslands on the upper edge of the Amazonian forest, between 1,000 and 4,000 metres (3,300 and 13,100 ft) elevation, from Central Peru in the north to Central Bolivia in the south.

== Taxonomy ==
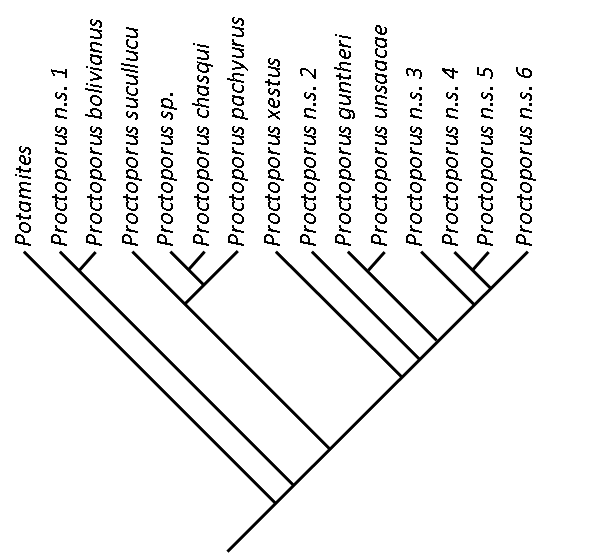
Relationships between the species assigned to Proctoporus. Note several new species that were previously assigned to P. bolivianus, but need to be split off based on genetic analysis

=== Species ===
The following 21 species are recognized as being valid.

- Proctoporus bolivianus F. Werner, 1910 – Bolivian lightbulb lizard
- Proctoporus carabaya Goicoechea, Padial, Chaparro, Castroviejo-Fisher & De la Riva, 2013
- Proctoporus cephalolineatus García-Pérz & Yustiz, 1995
- Proctoporus chasqui (Chávez, Siu-Ting, Duran & Venegas, 2011)
- Proctoporus guentheri (Boettger, 1891) – Günther's lightbulb lizard
- Proctoporus iridescens Goicoechea, Padial, Chaparro, Castroviejo-Fisher & De la Riva, 2013
- Proctoporus katerynae Mamani, Cruz, Mallqui & Catenazzi, 2022
- Proctoporus kiziriani Goicoechea, Padial, Chaparro, Castroviejo-Fisher & De la Riva, 2013
- Proctoporus lacertus (Stejneger, 1913)
- Proctoporus laudahnae (G. Köhler & Lehr, 2004)
- Proctoporus machupicchu Mamani, Goicoechea & Chaparro, 2015 – Machu Picchu Andean lizard
- Proctoporus oreades Chávez, Siu-Ting, Duran & Venegas, 2011
- Proctoporus optimus Mamani, Cruz, Mallqui & Catenazzi, 2022
- Proctoporus otishi Mamani & Rodríguez, 2022
- Proctoporus pachyurus Tschudi, 1845 – Tschudi's lightbulb lizard
- Proctoporus rahmi (De Grijs, 1936) – Rahm's sun tegu
- Proctoporus spinalis (Boulenger, 1911) – Boulenger's sun tegu
- Proctoporus sucullucu Doan & Castoe, 2003
- Proctoporus titans Lehr, Cusi, Fernandez, Vera & Catenazzi, 2022
- Proctoporus unsaacae Doan & Castoe, 2003
- Proctoporus xestus (Uzzell, 1969) – river teiid

Nota bene: A binomial authority in parentheses indicates that the species was originally described in a genus other than Proctoporus.
