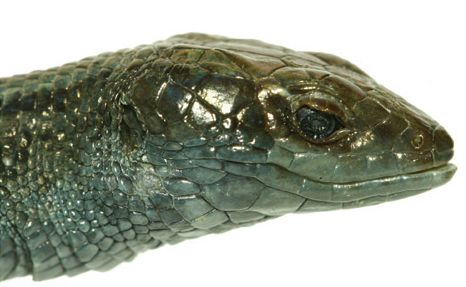

Conservation status
- Least Concern (IUCN 3.1)

Scientific classification
- Kingdom: Animalia
- Phylum: Chordata
- Class: Reptilia
- Order: Squamata
- Family: Gymnophthalmidae
- Genus: Proctoporus
- Species: P. spinalis

Binomial name
- Proctoporus spinalis (Boulenger, 1911)

Synonyms
- Euspondylus spinalis

= Proctoporus spinalis =

Species of lizard

Proctoporus spinalis, Boulenger's sun tegus, is a species of lizard in the family Gymnophthalmidae. It is endemic to Peru.
