= Proctoporus iridescens =

Scientific classification
- Kingdom: Animalia
- Phylum: Chordata
- Class: Reptilia
- Order: Squamata
- Family: Gymnophthalmidae
- Genus: Proctoporus
- Species: P. iridescens

Binomial name
- Proctoporus iridescens Goicoechea, Padial, Chaparro, Castroviejo-Fisher, & De la Riva, 2013

Species of lizard

Proctoporus iridescens is a species of lizard in the family Gymnophthalmidae. It is endemic to Peru.
