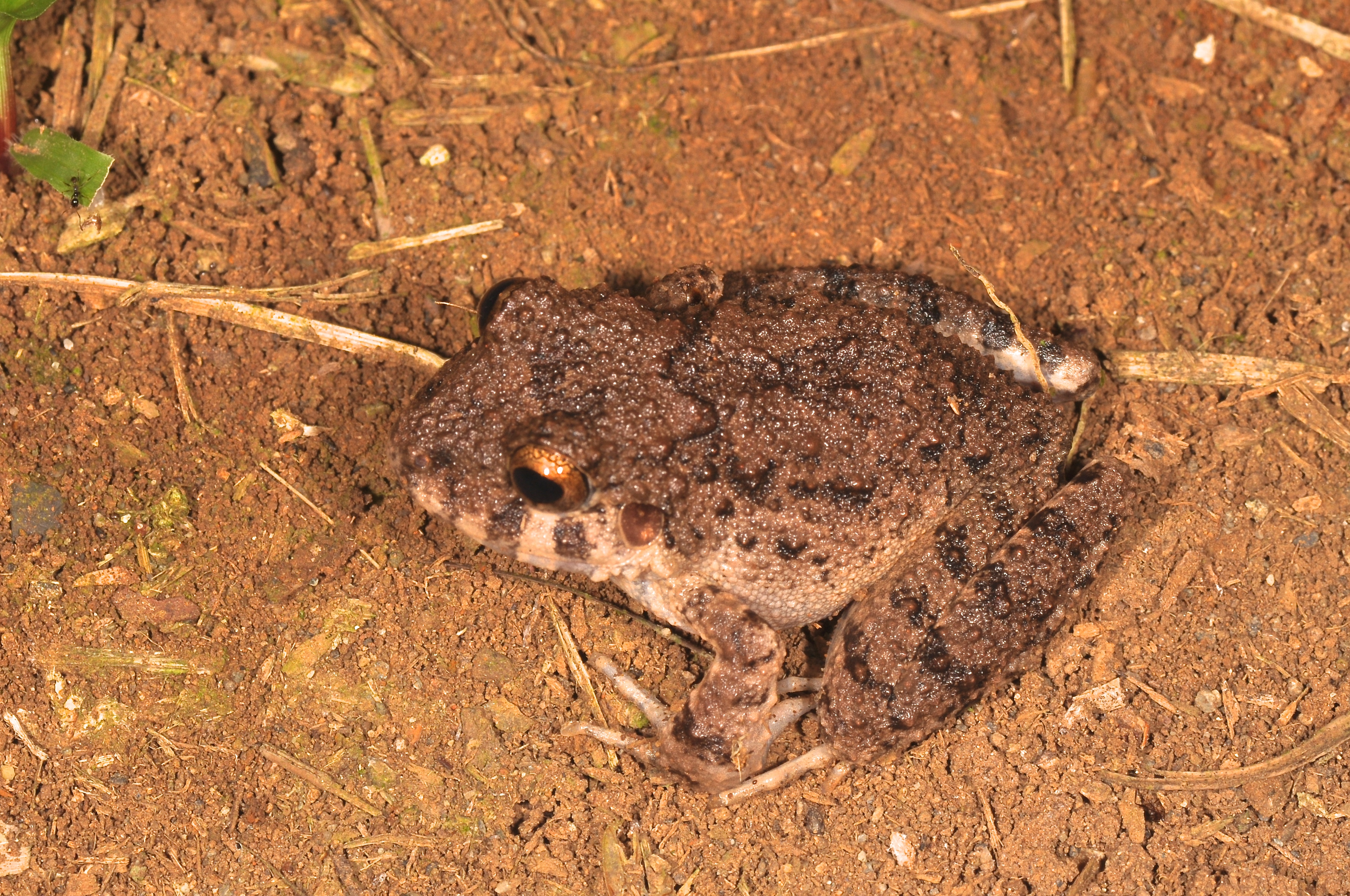
- Oreobates quixensis

Scientific classification
- Kingdom: Animalia
- Phylum: Chordata
- Class: Amphibia
- Order: Anura
- Clade: Brachycephaloidea
- Family: Craugastoridae
- Subfamily: Pristimantinae
- Genus: Oreobates; Jiménez de la Espada, 1872

Type species
- Oreobates quixensis Jiménez de la Espada, 1872

Diversity
- See text

Synonyms
- Teletrema Miranda-Ribeiro, 1937

= Oreobates =

Genus of amphibians

Oreobates is a genus of frogs in the family Craugastoridae. Most species were formerly in the genus Ischnocnema, but were moved to this revalidated genus following a 2006 revision. Its sister taxon is Lynchius.

These frogs are found in the lower slopes of the Andes into the upper Amazon Basin from Colombia south to northern Argentina and east into western Brazil.

A 2021 phylogenomic study found that Oreobates comprises two main clades: a northern group (Colombia–Peru) and a southern clade (Bolivia–Argentina), largely segregated by the elevational gradient. The study also found that highland species are less genetically diverse than their lowland relatives and carry more nonsynonymous mutations — a pattern consistent with historically smaller, more isolated populations and reduced efficacy of natural selection in mountain habitats.

== Description ==
Frogs in the genus Oreobates are small to medium-sized with males measuring 20–44 mm (0.79–1.73 in) and females 25–63 mm (0.98–2.48 in) in snout–vent length. They are generally brownish in colour. Body is robust with a short snout. The toes lack discs and fingers have reduced or absent discs; there is no webbing.

Species of the genus Oreobates lay terrestrial eggs that undergo direct development.

== Species ==
The following species are recognised in the genus Oreobates:

- Oreobates amarakaeri Padial, Chaparro, Castroviejo-Fisher, Guayasamin, Lehr, Delgado, Vaira, Teixeira, Aguayo-Vedia, and De la Riva, 2012
- Oreobates antrum Vaz-Silva, Maciel, Andrade, and Amaro, 2018
- Oreobates ayacucho (Lehr, 2007)
- Oreobates barituensis Vaira & Ferrari, 2008
- Oreobates berdemenos Pereyra, Cardozo, Baldo, and Baldo, 2014
- Oreobates chiquitanus Pansonato, Motta, Cacciali, Haddad, Strüssmann, and Jansen, 2020
- Oreobates choristolemma (Harvey and Sheehy, 2005)
- Oreobates colanensis Venegas, García Ayachi, Ormeño, Bullard, Catenazzi, and Motta, 2021
- Oreobates cruralis (Boulenger, 1902)
- Oreobates discoidalis (Peracca, 1895)
- Oreobates gemcare Padial, Chaparro, Castroviejo-Fisher, Guayasamin, Lehr, Delgado, Vaira, Teixeira, Aguayo-Vedia, and De la Riva, 2012
- Oreobates granulosus (Boulenger, 1903)
- Oreobates heterodactylus (Miranda-Ribeiro, 1937)
- Oreobates ibischi (Reichle, Lötters, and De la Riva, 2001)
- Oreobates lehri (Padial, Chaparro, and De la Riva, 2007)
- Oreobates lundbergi (Lehr, 2005)
- Oreobates machiguenga Padial, Chaparro, Castroviejo-Fisher, Guayasamin, Lehr, Delgado, Vaira, Teixeira, Aguayo-Vedia, and De la Riva, 2012
- Oreobates madidi (Padial, Gonzales-Álvarez, and De la Riva, 2005)
- Oreobates pereger (Lynch, 1975)
- Oreobates quixensis Jiménez de la Espada, 1872
- Oreobates remotus Teixeira, Amaro, Recoder, Sena, and Rodrigues, 2012
- Oreobates sanctaecrucis (Harvey and Keck, 1995)
- Oreobates sanderi (Padial, Reichle, and De la Riva, 2005)
- Oreobates saxatilis (Duellman, 1990)
- Oreobates shunkusacha Castillo-Urbina, Vences, Dezetter, Glaw, Burgos, Aliaga, Torres-Ccasani, Hope, Mendoza, and Köhler, 2025
- Oreobates yanucu Köhler and Padial, 2016
- Oreobates zongoensis (Reichle and Köhler, 1997)
