= Boana palaestes =

Conservation status
- Endangered (IUCN 3.1)

Scientific classification
- Kingdom: Animalia
- Phylum: Chordata
- Class: Amphibia
- Order: Anura
- Family: Hylidae
- Genus: Boana
- Species: B. palaestes

Binomial name
- Boana palaestes (Duellman, De la Riva & Wild, 1997)

Synonyms
- Hypsiboas palaestes (Duellman, De la Riva & Wild, 1997)

Species of frog

Boana palaestes is a species of frog in the family Hylidae that is endemic to Peru. Its natural habitats are subtropical or tropical moist montane forests and rivers.
