= Yunganastes pluvicanorus =

Conservation status
- Vulnerable (IUCN 3.1)

Scientific classification
- Kingdom: Animalia
- Phylum: Chordata
- Class: Amphibia
- Order: Anura
- Clade: Brachycephaloidea
- Family: Craugastoridae
- Genus: Yunganastes
- Species: Y. pluvicanorus

Binomial name
- Yunganastes pluvicanorus (De la Riva and Lynch, 1997)

Synonyms
- Eleutherodactylus pluvicanorus De la Riva and Lynch, 1997; Pristimantis pluvicanorus (De la Riva and Lynch, 1997)

Species of frog

Yunganastes pluvicanorus is a species of frog in the family Strabomantidae. It is endemic to Bolivia and found on the eastern slopes of the Cordillera Oriental in the Cochabamba and Santa Cruz Departments.

== Description ==
Adult males measure 31–41 mm (1.2–1.6 in) and adult females 34–47 mm (1.3–1.9 in) in snout–vent length. The head is wider than it is long; the snout is rounded. The tympanum is ovoid. The dorsolateral folds start from above the tympanum and extend to the groin. The canthus rostralis is sharp. Neither fingers nor toes have webbing or lateral fringes. The outer fingers have expanded discs; the toe discs are small. Dorsal skin is shagreened. The dorsum is beige to brown and has some darker markings. There is a dark brown canthal and supra-tympanic stripe. The upper lip has irregular brown blotches. The limbs are barred. The venter is cream, bearing some brown spots. Males have a large vocal sac.

== Habitat and conservation ==
Yunganastes pluvicanorus lives in cloud forest and humid montane forests (Yungas) at elevations of 2,000–2,550 m (6,560–8,370 ft) above sea level. It is both diurnal and nocturnal; males call both day and night on the ground or perching on bushes.

Yunganastes pluvicanorus is threatened by habitat loss and degradation caused primarily by agriculture. Carrasco and Amboró National Parks might protect it.
