= Proctoporus rahmi =

Conservation status
- Data Deficient (IUCN 3.1)

Scientific classification
- Kingdom: Animalia
- Phylum: Chordata
- Class: Reptilia
- Order: Squamata
- Family: Gymnophthalmidae
- Genus: Proctoporus
- Species: P. rahmi

Binomial name
- Proctoporus rahmi (De Grijs, 1936)

Synonyms
- Prionodactylus rahmi De Grijs, 1936; Euspondylus rahmi — J. Peters & Orejas-Miranda; Proctoporus rahmi — Torres-Carvajal et al., 2016

Species of lizard

Proctoporus rahmi, Rahm's sun tegu, is a species of lizard in the family Gymnophthalmidae. It is endemic to Peru.

== Etymology ==
The specific name, rahmi, is in honor of Peter Rahm who collected the holotype.

== Geographic range ==
P. rahmi is found in the Andes of southeastern Peru, near Cusco, at an altitude of 2,400 m (7,900 ft).

== Reproduction ==
P. rahmi is oviparous.
