= Proctoporus machupicchu =

Scientific classification
- Kingdom: Animalia
- Phylum: Chordata
- Class: Reptilia
- Order: Squamata
- Family: Gymnophthalmidae
- Genus: Proctoporus
- Species: P. machupicchu

Binomial name
- Proctoporus machupicchu Mamani, Goicoechea, & Chaparro, 2015

Species of lizard

Proctoporus machupicchu, the Machu Picchu Andean lizard, is a species of lizard in the family Gymnophthalmidae. It is endemic to Peru.
