= Oreobates ayacucho =

Conservation status
- Endangered (IUCN 3.1)

Scientific classification
- Kingdom: Animalia
- Phylum: Chordata
- Class: Amphibia
- Order: Anura
- Clade: Brachycephaloidea
- Family: Craugastoridae
- Genus: Oreobates
- Species: O. ayacucho

Binomial name
- Oreobates ayacucho (Lehr, 2007)

Synonyms
- Phrynopus ayacucho Lehr, 2007

Species of amphibian

Oreobates ayacucho is a species of frogs in the family Strabomantidae. It is endemic to Peru and known from a few localities in the Ayacucho Region in the Peruvian Andes. The species is only known from 11 specimens.

== Description ==
The female holotype measures 29 mm (1.1 in) in snout–vent length (SVL). Two adult males measure 19 and 25 mm (0.75 and 0.98 in) SVL. The snout is short and rounded. The tympanic membrane is absent but the tympanic annulus is visible beneath skin, partly covered by supratympanic. Skin on the dorsum is smooth and has small, elongate tubercles, and forms discontinuous occipital and dorsolateral folds. Fingers and toes have knob-shaped terminal phalanges but no webbing. The dorsum and venter are dark brown, with the folds and some warts almost black. The iris is almost black and has some golden reticulation.

The male advertisement call consists of a group of 3–5 pulsed, amplitude-modulated notes. The call lasts less than a second, but is repeated at a rate of 2.5–2.9 calls per minute when males are motivated.

== Habitat and conservation ==
Individuals have been found in cold puna grassland at elevations of 3,411–3,850 m (11,191–12,631 ft) above sea level. Males have been heard calling by day. Individuals can hide under thick layers of moss near the ground or within piles of stones. The habitat of this species is threatened by overgrazing from cattle and construction of gas projects. Also burning and collection of the grass could be threats.
