= Nannophryne cophotis =

Conservation status
- Critically Endangered (IUCN 3.1)

Scientific classification
- Kingdom: Animalia
- Phylum: Chordata
- Class: Amphibia
- Order: Anura
- Family: Bufonidae
- Genus: Nannophryne
- Species: N. cophotis

Binomial name
- Nannophryne cophotis Boulenger, 1900

Synonyms
- Bufo cophotis Boulenger, 1900; Chaunus cophotis (Boulenger, 1900)

Species of amphibian

Nannophryne cophotis, or the Paramo toad, is a species of toad in the family Bufonidae that is endemic to northern Peru. Its natural habitats are puna grassland, high-altitude plateaus, and dry scrubland; it also occurs agricultural land (e.g., potato and maize fields). It breeds in temporary small ponds and permanent shallow streams at altitudes of 2000-4100 meters asl. Individuals have not been recorded since 2005, after what was believed to be a severe decline in its population. It was last known from: Granja Porcón & El Empalme (1999-2000); La Libertad (2003); Ancash (2004); and Cajamarca (2005). If a population exists it is believed to have 0-49 individuals remaining threatened from loss of habitat, pollution, conversion of land for farming, small and large-scale mining concessions, and the modification of waterways.
