= Oreobates ibischi =

Conservation status
- Least Concern (IUCN 3.1)

Scientific classification
- Kingdom: Animalia
- Phylum: Chordata
- Class: Amphibia
- Order: Anura
- Clade: Brachycephaloidea
- Family: Craugastoridae
- Genus: Oreobates
- Species: O. ibischi

Binomial name
- Oreobates ibischi (Reichle, Lötters & De la Riva, 2001)

Synonyms
- Eleutherodactylus ibischi Reichle, Lötters & De la Riva, 2001

Species of frog

Oreobates ibischi is a species of frog in the family Strabomantidae. It is endemic to Bolivia. Its natural habitats are subtropical or tropical dry forest, rural gardens, and heavily degraded former forest. It is threatened by habitat loss.
