= Proctoporus cephalolineatus =

Conservation status
- Endangered (IUCN 3.1)

Scientific classification
- Kingdom: Animalia
- Phylum: Chordata
- Class: Reptilia
- Order: Squamata
- Family: Gymnophthalmidae
- Genus: Proctoporus
- Species: P. cephalolineatus

Binomial name
- Proctoporus cephalolineatus García-Pérez & Yustiz, 1995

Species of lizard

Proctoporus cephalolineatus is a species of lizard in the family Gymnophthalmidae. It is endemic to Venezuela.
