= Proctoporus optimus =

Scientific classification
- Kingdom: Animalia
- Phylum: Chordata
- Class: Reptilia
- Order: Squamata
- Family: Gymnophthalmidae
- Genus: Proctoporus
- Species: P. optimus

Binomial name
- Proctoporus optimus Mamani, Cruz, Mallqui, & Catenazzi, 2022

Species of lizard

Proctoporus optimus is a species of lizard in the family Gymnophthalmidae. It is endemic to Peru, in montane ecosystems.
