= Ignacio J. De la Riva =

Ignacio De la Riva
- Born: 8 January 1960 (age 66)
- Education: Complutense University of Madrid
- Known for: Research on Neotropical amphibians and reptiles; discovery of Telmatobius yuracare
- Scientific career
- Fields: Herpetology
- Workplaces: Museo Nacional de Ciencias Naturales, Madrid
- Doctoral advisor: Javier Castroviejo, Luis Felipe López-Jurado

Ignacio José De la Riva de la Viña (born 8 January 1960) is a Spanish herpetologist. His research focuses on the neotropical herpetofauna.

== Biography ==
In 1986, De la Riva received his master's degree from the Complutense University of Madrid. From June 1986 to December 1987, he was a fellow of the Consejo Superior de Investigaciones Científicas and later worked at the Estación Biológica de Doñana cataloguing its herpetological collection. From January 1988 to August 1990, he held a fellowship from the Instituto de Cooperación Iberoamericana, through the Asociación de Amigos de Doñana, to carry out his doctoral research in Bolivia. From April 1991 to December 1992, he had a fellowship at the University of Las Palmas de Gran Canaria.

In 1993, he obtained his doctorate at the Complutense University of Madrid with the dissertation Ecología de una comunidad neotropical de anfibios durante la estación lluviosa under the supervision of Javier Castroviejo and Luis Felipe López-Jurado. From May to December 1993, he worked for the Belgian company Agreco within the ECOFAC program funded by the European Economic Community, serving as a forest ecologist to assess biodiversity in Monte Alén National Park, Equatorial Guinea.

From April 1994 to April 1996, he conducted postdoctoral research at the University of Kansas Natural History Museum. In May–June 1995, he participated in a survey of amphibians and reptiles in Coiba National Park, Panama, under the direction of Santiago Castroviejo. Since May 1996, De la Riva has been a senior researcher in the Department of Biodiversity and Evolutionary Biology at the Museo Nacional de Ciencias Naturales in Madrid.

His research interests include taxonomy, systematics, phylogeny, biogeography, and the ecology of reptiles and amphibians, particularly tropical frogs from Latin America. He has conducted continuous fieldwork in the Neotropics since 1987, focusing mainly on Andean and Amazonian frogs of Bolivia and southern Peru. He also works on Bolivian lizards of the genus Liolaemus, amphibian conservation, and the impacts of chytridiomycosis on Bolivian species. In addition, he collaborates internationally on studies examining the effects of climate change on lizard populations worldwide.

Among his best-known discoveries is the Sehuencas water frog (Telmatobius yuracare), a Bolivian species thought to be represented by a single surviving male ("Romeo") from 2008 until five additional individuals were rediscovered in 2019.

== Species described ==
Ignacio De la Riva has been involved in the description of the following species:

- Atelopus loettersi De la Riva, Castroviejo-Fisher, Chaparro, Boistel, Padial, 2011
- Boana gladiator (Köhler, Koscinski, Padial, Chaparro, Handford, Lougheed, De la Riva, 2010)
- Boana palaestes (Duellman, De la Riva, Wild, 1997)
- Boophis arcanus Glaw, Köhler, De la Riva, Vieites, Vences, 2010
- Boophis entingae Glaw, Köhler, De la Riva, Vieites, Vences, 2010
- Boophis haingana Glaw, Köhler, De la Riva, Vieites, Vences, 2010
- Boophis luciae Glaw, Köhler, De la Riva, Vieites, Vences, 2010
- Boophis miadana Glaw, Köhler, De la Riva, Vieites, Vences, 2010
- Boophis piperatus Glaw, Köhler, De la Riva, Vieites, Vences, 2010
- Boophis praedictus Glaw, Köhler, De la Riva, Vieites, Vences, 2010
- Boophis roseipalmatus Glaw, Köhler, De la Riva, Vieites, Vences, 2010
- Boophis sandrae Glaw, Köhler, De la Riva, Vieites, Vences, 2010
- Boophis spinophis Glaw, Köhler, De la Riva, Vieites, Vences, 2010
- Bryophryne bakersfield Chaparro, Padial, Gutiérrez, De la Riva, 2015
- Bryophryne bustamantei (Chaparro, De la Riva, Padial, Ochoa, Lehr, 2007)
- Bryophryne quellokunka De la Riva, Chaparro, Castroviejo-Fisher, Padial, 2017
- Bryophryne tocra De la Riva, Chaparro, Castroviejo-Fisher, Padial, 2017
- Bryophryne wilakunka De la Riva, Chaparro, Castroviejo-Fisher, Padial, 2017
- Gastrotheca antoniiochoai (De la Riva & Chaparro, 2005)
- Gephyromantis runewsweeki Vences and De la Riva, 2007
- Hyalinobatrachium carlesvilai Castroviejo-Fisher, Padial, Chaparro, Aguayo-Vedia, De la Riva, 2009
- Lynchius oblitus Motta, Chaparro, Pombal, Guayasamin, De la Riva, Padial, 2016
- Lynchius tabaconas Motta, Chaparro, Pombal, Guayasamin, De la Riva, Padial, 2016
- Microkayla ankohuma (Padial & De la Riva, 2007)
- Microkayla chacaltaya (De la Riva, Padial, Cortéz, 2007)
- Microkayla chapi De la Riva, Chaparro, Castroviejo-Fisher, Padial, 2017
- Microkayla chaupi (De la Riva & Aparicio, 2016)
- Microkayla chilina De la Riva, Chaparro, Castroviejo-Fisher, Padial, 2017
- Microkayla colla (De la Riva, Aparicio, Soto, Ríos, 2016)
- Microkayla condoriri (De la Riva, Aguayo, Padial, 2007)
- Microkayla guillei (De la Riva, 2007)
- Microkayla harveyi (Muñoz, Aguayo, De la Riva, 2007)
- Microkayla huayna De la Riva, F. Cortez, Burrowes, 2017
- Microkayla iani (De la Riva, Reichle, Cortéz, 2007)
- Microkayla illampu (De la Riva, Reichle, Padial, 2007)
- Microkayla illimani (De la Riva & Padial, 2007)
- Microkayla kallawaya (De la Riva & Martínez-Solano, 2007)
- Microkayla katantika (De la Riva & Martínez-Solano, 2007)
- Microkayla kempffi (De la Riva, 1992)
- Microkayla melanocheira (De la Riva, Ríos, Aparicio, 2016)
- Microkayla quimsacruzis (De la Riva, Reichle, Bosch, 2007)
- Microkayla saltator (De la Riva, Reichle, Bosch, 2007)
- Microkayla teqta (De la Riva & Burrowes, 2014)
- Nannophryne apolobambica (De la Riva, Ríos, Aparicio, 2005)
- Noblella carrascoicola (De la Riva & Köhler, 1998)
- Oreobates amarakaeri Padial, Chaparro, Castroviejo-Fisher, Guayasamin, Lehr, Delgado, Vaira, Teixeira, Aguayo-Vedia, De la Riva, 2012
- Oreobates gemcare Padial, Chaparro, Castroviejo-Fisher, Guayasamin, Lehr, Delgado, Vaira, Teixeira, Aguayo-Vedia, De la Riva, 2012
- Oreobates ibischi (Reichle, Lötters, De la Riva, 2001)
- Oreobates lehri (Padial, Chaparro, De la Riva, 2007)
- Oreobates machiguenga Padial, Chaparro, Castroviejo-Fisher, Guayasamin, Lehr, Delgado, Vaira, Teixeira, Aguayo-Vedia, De la Riva, 2012
- Oreobates madidi (Padial, Gonzales-Álvarez, De la Riva, 2005)
- Oreobates sanderi (Padial, Reichle, De la Riva, 2005)
- Phrynopus mariellaleo Venegas, Barboza, De la Riva, Padial, 2018
- Phrynopus miroslawae Chaparro, Padial, De la Riva, 2008
- Phyllomedusa camba De la Riva, 1999
- Phyllomedusa chaparroi Castroviejo-Fisher, Köhler, De la Riva, Padial, 2017
- Pristimantis koehleri Padial & De la Riva, 2009
- Pristimantis reichlei Padial & De la Riva, 2009
- Proctoporus carabaya Padial, Chaparro, Castroviejo-Fisher & De La Riva, 2013
- Proctoporus iridescens Padial, Chaparro, Castroviejo-Fisher & De La Riva, 2013
- Proctoporus kiziriani Padial, Chaparro, Castroviejo-Fisher & De La Riva, 2013
- Psychrophrynella usurpator De la Riva, Chaparro, Padial, 2008
- Rhinella tacana (Padial, Reichle, McDiarmid, De la Riva, 2006)
- Scinax castroviejoi De la Riva, 1993
- Scinax chiquitanus (De la Riva, 1990)
- Telmatobius edaphonastes De la Riva, 1995
- Telmatobius espadai De la Riva, 2005
- Telmatobius mantaro Ttito, Landauro, Venegas, De la Riva, Chaparro, 2016
- Telmatobius mendelsoni De la Riva, Trueb, Duellman, 2012
- Telmatobius sibiricus De la Riva & Harvey, 2003
- Telmatobius timens De la Riva, Aparicio, Ríos, 2005
- Telmatobius yuracare De la Riva, 1994
- Yunganastes pluvicanorus (De la Riva & Lynch, 1997)

== Eponyms ==
In 2001, Jörn Köhler and Stefan Lötters named the frog species Dendropsophus delarivai in his honor.
