= Proctoporus guentheri =

Conservation status
- Least Concern (IUCN 3.1)

Scientific classification
- Kingdom: Animalia
- Phylum: Chordata
- Class: Reptilia
- Order: Squamata
- Family: Gymnophthalmidae
- Genus: Proctoporus
- Species: P. guentheri

Binomial name
- Proctoporus guentheri (Boettger, 1891)

Synonyms
- Oreosaurus guentheri Boettger, 1891; Oreosaurus ocellifer Boulenger, 1902; Prionodactylus ocellifer — F. Werner, 1916; Oreosaurus anomalus Barbour & Noble, 1921; Proctoporus guentheri — J. Peters & Donoso-Barros, 1970

Species of lizard

Proctoporus guentheri, also known commonly as Günther's lightbulb lizard , is a species of lizard in the family Gymnophthalmidae. The species occurs in South America.

== Etymology ==
The specific name, guentheri, is in honor of German-born British herpetologist Albert Günther.

== Geographic range ==
P. guentheri is found in Bolivia (Cochabamba, La Paz, and Santa Cruz departments) and Peru (Cuzco Region).

== Habitat ==
The preferred natural habitat of P. guentheri is forest, at altitudes of 825–3,362 m (2,707–11,030 ft).

== Reproduction ==
P. guentheri is oviparous.
