= Nannophryne corynetes =

Abra Malaga toad

Conservation status
- Endangered (IUCN 3.1)

Scientific classification
- Kingdom: Animalia
- Phylum: Chordata
- Class: Amphibia
- Order: Anura
- Family: Bufonidae
- Genus: Nannophryne
- Species: N. corynetes

Binomial name
- Nannophryne corynetes (Duellman & Ochoa, 1991)

Synonyms
- Bufo corynetes Duellman and Ochoa-M., 1991; Chaunus corynetes (Duellman and Ochoa-M., 1991)

Species of amphibian

Nannophryne corynetes, the Abra Malaga toad, is a species of toad in the family Bufonidae that is endemic to Peru and only found in the region of the type locality in the Urubamba Province. Its natural habitats are forest edges restricted to the zone of puna grassland directly adjacent to montane forest. Breeding habitat is unknown but probably aquatic. It is a very rare species but there are no immediate threats to it.
