= Proctoporus bolivianus =

Conservation status
- Least Concern (IUCN 3.1)

Scientific classification
- Kingdom: Animalia
- Phylum: Chordata
- Class: Reptilia
- Order: Squamata
- Suborder: Lacertoidea
- Family: Gymnophthalmidae
- Genus: Proctoporus
- Species: P. bolivianus

Binomial name
- Proctoporus bolivianus Werner, 1910

Species of lizard

Proctoporus bolivianus, the Bolivian lightbulb lizard , is a species of lizard in the family Gymnophthalmidae. It is found in Bolivia and Peru.
