= Yunganastes fraudator =

Conservation status
- Vulnerable (IUCN 3.1)

Scientific classification
- Kingdom: Animalia
- Phylum: Chordata
- Class: Amphibia
- Order: Anura
- Family: Strabomantidae
- Genus: Yunganastes
- Species: Y. fraudator

Binomial name
- Yunganastes fraudator (Lynch and McDiarmid, 1987)

Synonyms
- Eleutherodactylus fraudator Lynch and McDiarmid, 1987; Pristimantis fraudator (Lynch and McDiarmid, 1987)

Species of amphibian

Yunganastes fraudator is a species of frog in the family Strabomantidae. It is endemic to Bolivia and found in the Cochabamba Department to the border with the Santa Cruz Department. It is sometimes known as Cochamba robber frog. Its specific name fraudator means "cheat" or "deceiver" and refers to its resemblance with Gastrotheca marsupiata.

== Description ==
Adult males in the type series (two individuals) measure about 28 mm (1.1 in) in snout–vent length (SVL). In a larger series, adult males measure 26–33 mm (1.0–1.3 in) and adult females 40–48 mm (1.6–1.9 in) SVL. The snout is rounded. The canthus rostralis is sharp. The supra-tympanic fold is slightly obscuring the upper edge of the tympanum. Neither fingers nor toes have webbing but may have weakly defined lateral fringes. The outer fingers have slightly enlarged tips; only the IV toe has enlarged disc. Dorsal skin is smooth to shagreened with few scattered warts. The dorsum is brown to grey and has dark brown to black longitudinal stripes and black canthal–supra-tympanic and labial stripes.

== Habitat and conservation ==
Its natural habitat is cloud forest of the Yungas at elevations of 2,000–3,000 m (6,600–9,800 ft) above sea level. It is nocturnal and mostly terrestrial, but some individuals can be active in brushwoods, bushes, and ferns, or on the ground during the day.

Yunganastes fraudator is a reasonably common frog although it is locally suffering from habitat loss. Its range overlaps with the Carrasco and Amboró National Parks.
