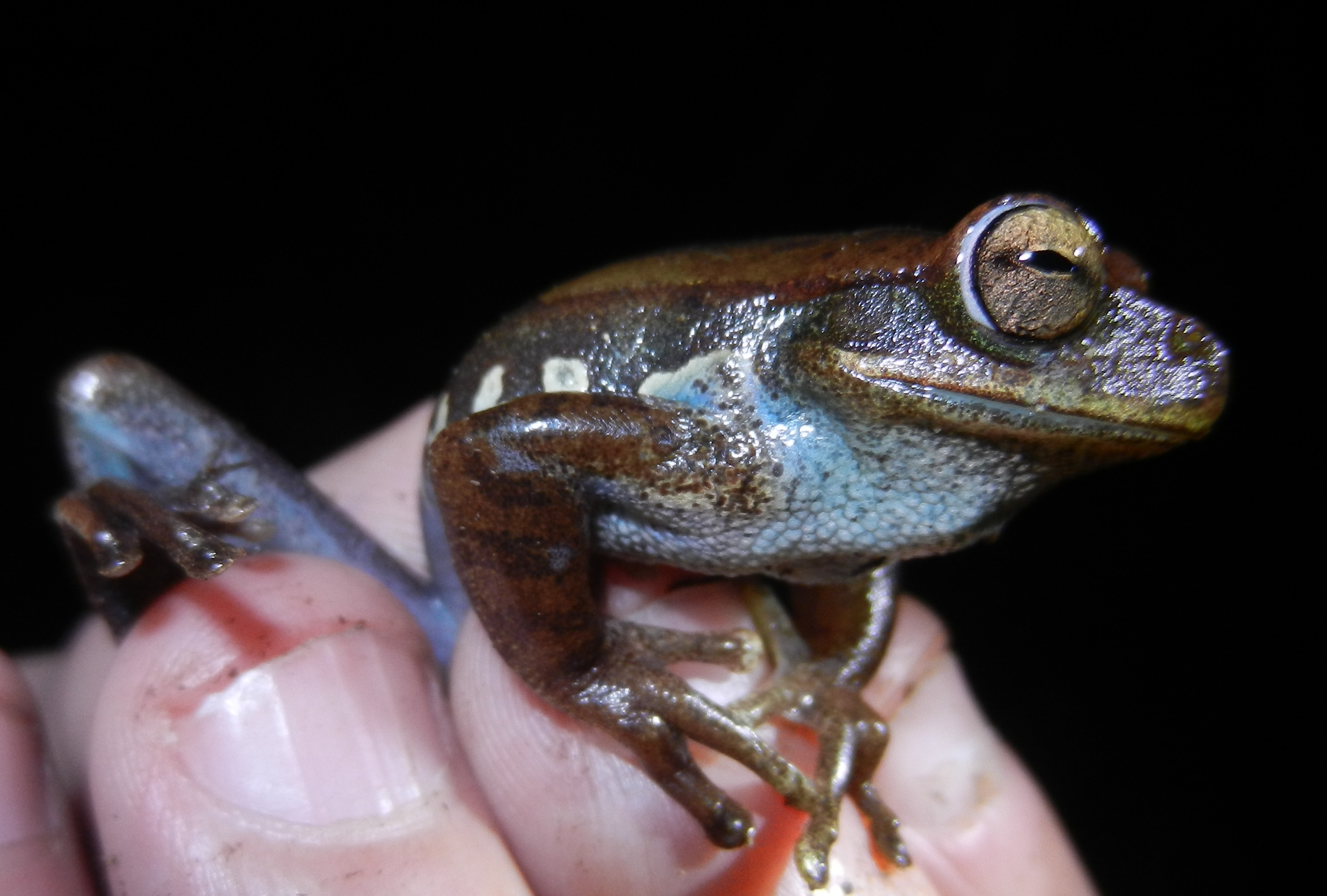

Conservation status
- Vulnerable (IUCN 3.1)

Scientific classification
- Kingdom: Animalia
- Phylum: Chordata
- Class: Amphibia
- Order: Anura
- Family: Hylidae
- Genus: Boana
- Species: B. gladiator

Binomial name
- Boana gladiator (Köhler, Koscinski, Padial, Chaparro, Handford, Lougheed, and De la Riva, 2010)

Synonyms
- Hypsiboas gladiator Köhler, Koscinski, Padial, Chaparro, Handford, Lougheed, and De la Riva, 2010; Boana gladiator Dubois, 2017

= Boana gladiator =

Species of frog

Boana gladiator, the Cusco gladiator tree frog, is a frog in the family Hylidae endemic to Peru, in Cusco and Puno. Scientists have seen it between 1,097 and 1,975 metres (3,599 and 6,480 ft) above sea level in cloud forests.

The adult male frog measures 35.3 to 49.4 mm (1.39 to 1.94 in) long in snout-vent length and the adult female frog 47.8 to 55.3 mm (1.88 to 2.18 in). Like other gladiator tree frogs, the male Cusco gladiator tree frog has a spike on each front foot that he uses to fight other males. The female frog lays eggs in streams.

This frog is listed as vulnerable to extinction. This is largely because of habitat loss, but it is also subject to chytridiomycosis from the fungus Batrachochytrium dendrobatidis. This illness thickens the frog's skin, which then sloughs off so that it can no longer osmoregulate. The concentration of electrolytes in the frog's blood drops, and the frog then dies of cardiac arrest.
