= Proctoporus otishi =

Scientific classification
- Kingdom: Animalia
- Phylum: Chordata
- Class: Reptilia
- Order: Squamata
- Family: Gymnophthalmidae
- Genus: Proctoporus
- Species: P. otishi

Binomial name
- Proctoporus otishi Mamani & Rodriguez, 2022

Species of lizard

Proctoporus otishi is a species of lizard in the family Gymnophthalmidae. It is endemic to Peru.
