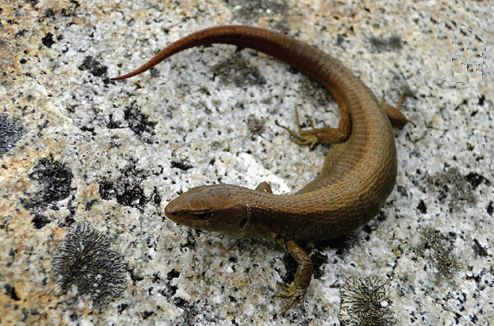

Conservation status
- Data Deficient (IUCN 3.1)

Scientific classification
- Kingdom: Animalia
- Phylum: Chordata
- Class: Reptilia
- Order: Squamata
- Family: Gymnophthalmidae
- Genus: Proctoporus
- Species: P. oreades

Binomial name
- Proctoporus oreades (Chavez, Siu-Ting, Duran, & Venegas, 2011)

Synonyms
- Euspondylus oreades

= Proctoporus oreades =

Species of lizard

Proctoporus oreades is a species of lizard in the family Gymnophthalmidae. It is endemic to Peru.
