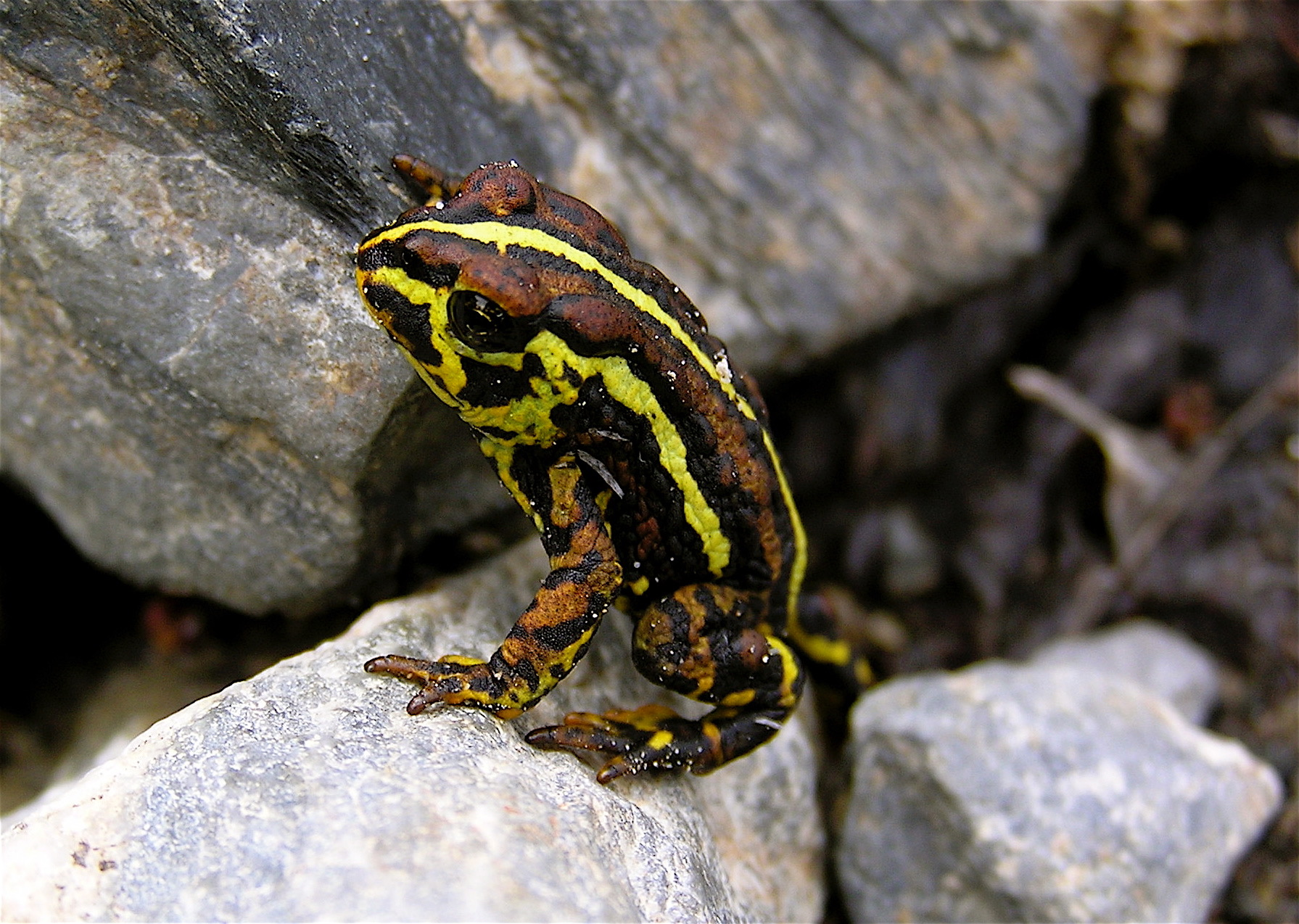

Conservation status
- Least Concern (IUCN 3.1)

Scientific classification
- Kingdom: Animalia
- Phylum: Chordata
- Class: Amphibia
- Order: Anura
- Family: Bufonidae
- Genus: Nannophryne
- Species: N. variegata

Binomial name
- Nannophryne variegata Günther, 1870

Synonyms
- Bufo variegatus (Günther, 1870); Bufo trivittatus Philippi, 1902; Bufo albigularis Philippi, 1902

= Nannophryne variegata =

Species of amphibian

Nannophryne variegata, known also as the Eden Harbour toad or Patagonian toad, is a species of toad in the family Bufonidae. It is found in southern Argentina (from Neuquén southwards) and Chile. There is also a record from Peru, but this requires confirmation given its great geographic and ecological isolation. It occurs in Tierra del Fuego south to 53°S, making it the southernmost amphibian in the world, a record shared with Batrachyla antartandica.

Its natural habitats are temperate to cold humid forests, bogs, and Magellanic tundra. It occurs in marshes, under logs in the Nothofagus forest region as well as tundra surrounded by low stature Nothofagus forest in the subantarctic region. Reproduction takes place in shallow temporary pools and swamps. It is a locally abundant species that tolerates some disturbance.
