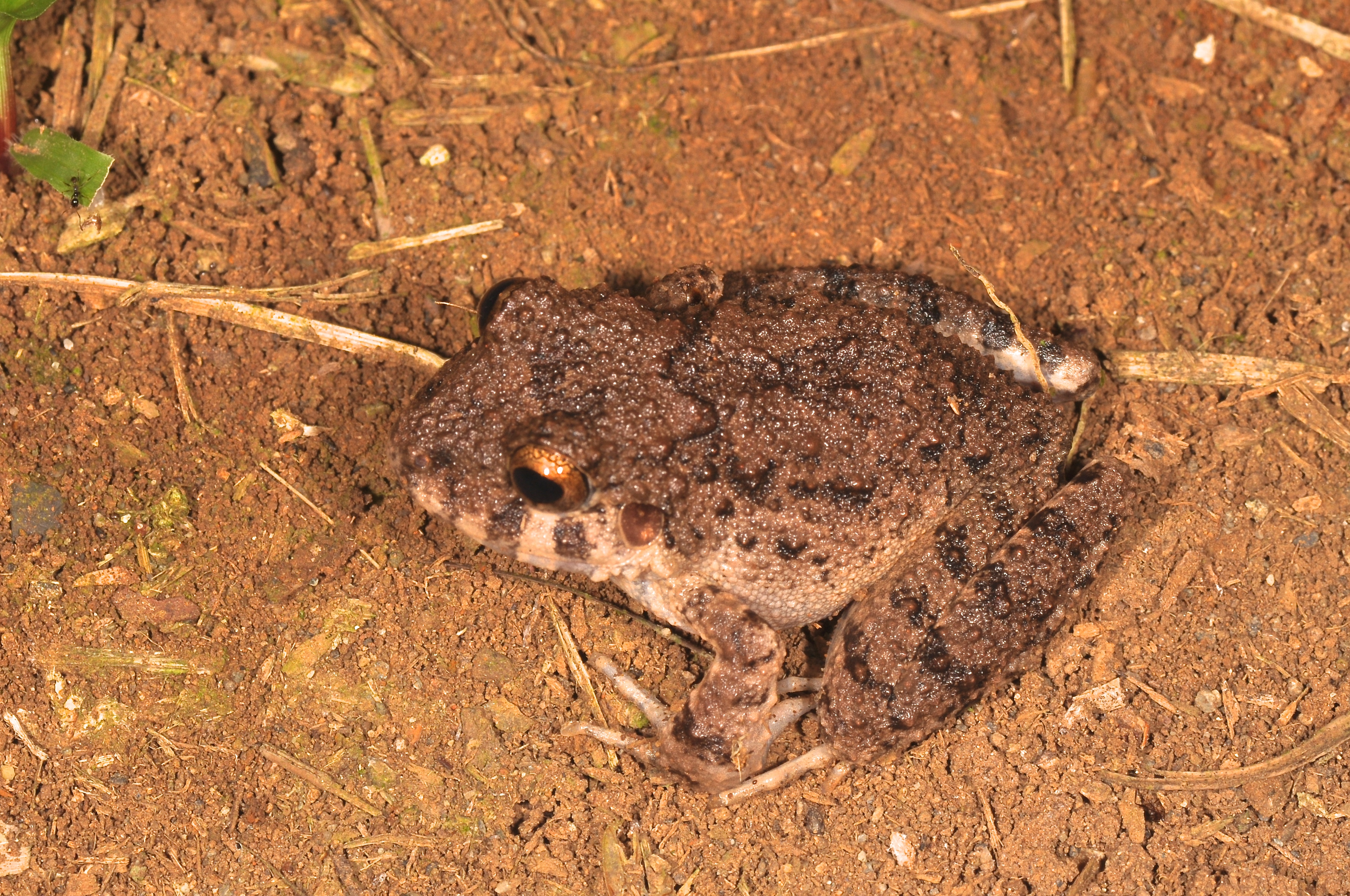

Conservation status
- Least Concern (IUCN 3.1)

Scientific classification
- Kingdom: Animalia
- Phylum: Chordata
- Class: Amphibia
- Order: Anura
- Family: Strabomantidae
- Genus: Oreobates
- Species: O. quixensis

Binomial name
- Oreobates quixensis Jiménez de la Espada, 1872

Synonyms
- Ischnocnema quixensis (Jiménez de la Espada, 1872); Leptodactylus tuberculosus Andersson, 1945

= Oreobates quixensis =

Species of amphibian

Oreobates quixensis, also known as the common big-headed frog, is a species of frog in the family Strabomantidae. It is found in the upper Amazon Basin in Bolivia, western Brazil, Colombia, Ecuador, and Peru. It is a very common terrestrial frog of primary and secondary tropical moist forest, also to be found in clearings, open areas and banana groves.

== Description ==
Oreobates quixensis are large among the species of the genus Oreobates with adults measuring 35–63 mm (1.4–2.5 in) in snout–vent length. The head is large and wider than long; the snout is short. The dorsum is pale brown to dark brown with purple tonalities and cream flecks; the skin is granular, with round keratinized granules and small, sparse, prominent, and enlarged warts. Breeding is by direct development. Gravid females contain 15–51 eggs.

== Taxonomy ==
Phylogenomic analysis in 2021 revealed that O. quixensis is closely related to Oreobates saxatilis. The study found the two species to be mutually polyphyletic, meaning individuals of one species are sometimes genetically closer to the other than to their own kind. This suggests either recent divergence, historical gene flow, or that current morphological definitions do not perfectly match their genetic evolutionary history.
