= Proctoporus lacertus =

Conservation status
- Least Concern (IUCN 3.1)

Scientific classification
- Kingdom: Animalia
- Phylum: Chordata
- Class: Reptilia
- Order: Squamata
- Family: Gymnophthalmidae
- Genus: Proctoporus
- Species: P. lacertus

Binomial name
- Proctoporus lacertus (Stejneger, 1913)

Species of lizard

Proctoporus lacertus is a species of lizard in the family Gymnophthalmidae. It is endemic to Peru.
