= Nannophryne apolobambica =

Conservation status
- Critically Endangered (IUCN 3.1)

Scientific classification
- Kingdom: Animalia
- Phylum: Chordata
- Class: Amphibia
- Order: Anura
- Family: Bufonidae
- Genus: Nannophryne
- Species: N. apolobambica

Binomial name
- Nannophryne apolobambica (De la Riva, Ríos, and Aparicio, 2005)

Synonyms
- Bufo apolobambicus De la Riva, Ríos, and Aparicio, 2005; Chaunus apolobambicus (De la Riva, Ríos, and Aparicio, 2005)

Species of amphibian

Nannophryne apolobambica is a species of toad in the family Bufonidae. It is endemic to Bolivia and only known from its type locality on the banks of Pelechuco River, Cordillera Apolobamba, in the Franz Tamayo Province of northwestern Bolivia. Its natural habitat is tropical cloud forest. Active toads were found on the forest floor and paths both day and night. It is threatened by habitat loss. The type locality is partly within the Madidi National Park.
