= Boophis arcanus =

Conservation status
- Endangered (IUCN 3.1)

Scientific classification
- Kingdom: Animalia
- Phylum: Chordata
- Class: Amphibia
- Order: Anura
- Family: Mantellidae
- Genus: Boophis
- Species: B. arcanus

Binomial name
- Boophis arcanus Glaw, Köhler, De la Riva, Vieites, and Vences, 2010

Species of amphibian

Boophis arcanus is a species of frogs in the family Mantellidae. It is endemic to Madagascar. This species does not show sexual dimorphism.
