= Proctoporus sucullucu =

Conservation status
- Least Concern (IUCN 3.1)

Scientific classification
- Kingdom: Animalia
- Phylum: Chordata
- Class: Reptilia
- Order: Squamata
- Family: Gymnophthalmidae
- Genus: Proctoporus
- Species: P. sucullucu

Binomial name
- Proctoporus sucullucu Doan & Castoe, 2003

Species of lizard

Proctoporus sucullucu is a species of lizard in the family Gymnophthalmidae. It is endemic to Peru.
