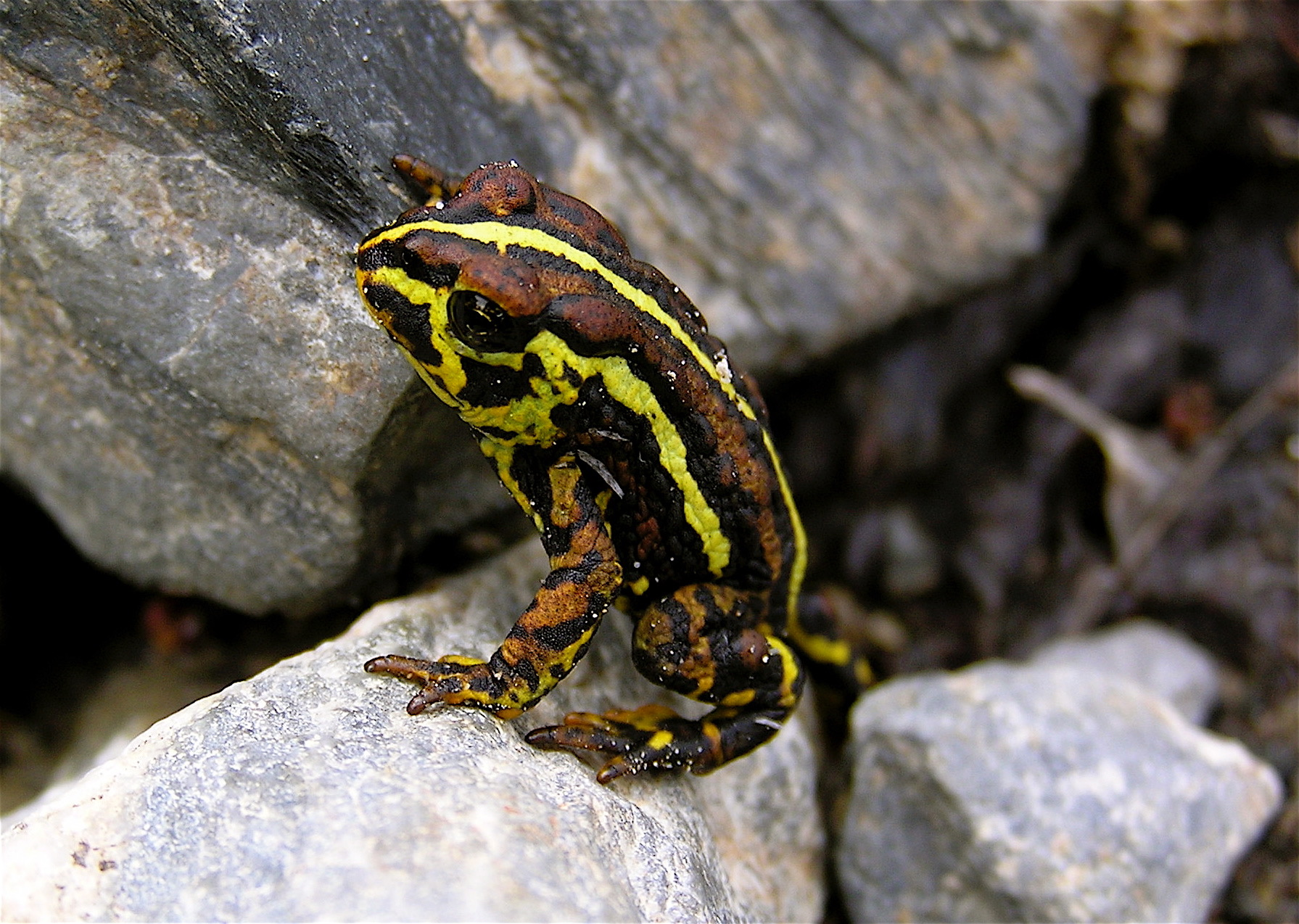
- Nannophryne variegata

Scientific classification
- Kingdom: Animalia
- Phylum: Chordata
- Class: Amphibia
- Order: Anura
- Family: Bufonidae
- Genus: Nannophryne; Günther, 1870

Type species
- Nannophryne variegata Günther, 1870

Diversity
- 4 species (see text)

= Nannophryne =

Genus of amphibians

Nannophryne is a small genus of true toads, family Bufonidae, from South America. They are found in central Andean Peru south to southern Chile and adjacent Argentina.

== Taxonomy ==
The genus was placed in synonymy with Bufo by George Albert Boulenger in 1894, but it was resurrected in 2006 by Frost when splitting the then very large Bufo into smaller, monophyletic genera. This change was controversial but has now largely been accepted. The alternative, treating Nannophryne as a subgenus of Bufo, still has some following.

== Species ==
There are four species in this genus:

- Nannophryne apolobambica (De la Riva, Ríos, and Aparicio, 2005)
- Nannophryne cophotis (Boulenger, 1900)
- Nannophryne corynetes (Duellman and Ochoa-M., 1991)
- Nannophryne variegata Günther, 1870
