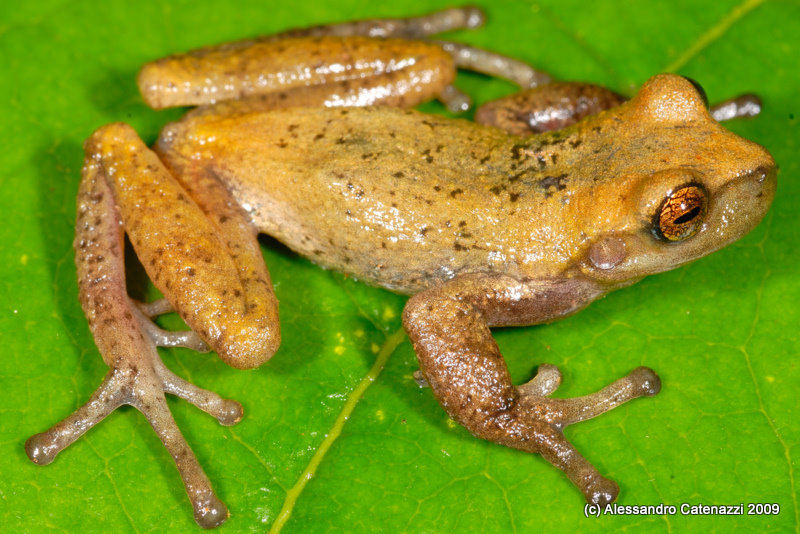

Conservation status
- Data Deficient (IUCN 3.1)

Scientific classification
- Kingdom: Animalia
- Phylum: Chordata
- Class: Amphibia
- Order: Anura
- Family: Hemiphractidae
- Genus: Gastrotheca
- Species: G. antoniiochoai

Binomial name
- Gastrotheca antoniiochoai (De la Riva and Chaparro, 2005)

Synonyms
- Hyla antoniiochoai De la Riva and Chaparro, 2005; Gastrotheca antoniiochoai Catenazzi and Lehr, 2009; Gastrotheca (Gastrotheca) antoniiochoai Duellman, 2015

= Gastrotheca antoniiochoai =

Species of amphibian

Gastrotheca antoniiochoai is a species of frog in the family Hemiphractidae. It is endemic to Peru and only known from near its type locality near the Wayqecha Biological Station (Cusco Region).

== Description ==
The adult male frog measures 26.5 mm in snout-vent length (as ascertained from two specimens) and the adult female is 32.5 mm. Like other frogs in Gastrotheca, the female frogs have pouches for their eggs, but G. antoniiochoai have two lateral pouches instead of one dorsal pouch.

Adult frogs and juvenile frogs look different. The skin of the adult frog's back is brown to gold-tan in color with dark spots and green spots that extend from the interorbital area to the sacrum. The eyelids have dark marks on them. There is a tan stripe from the snout to each eye. The flanks are light brown with darker brown spots. The belly is gray-brown or light brown with black melanophores. The iris of the eye is bronze in color.

Juvenile frogs have bars on their limbs and a brown stripe from the nose all the way to the middle of each side of the body. The iris of the young frog's eye is red-bronze in color with black reticulations.

== Taxonomy ==
Scientists used to place this species in the genus Hyla but it is currently in Gastrotheca. Scientists are not certain if the frog is related to G. zeugocystis. Both species have paired egg pouches on the sides of the body rather than one on the back, but the frogs' known ranges are 600 km (370 mi) apart.

== Habitat ==
This frog has been collected from cloud forest at elevations of about 2,700–3,300 m (8,900–10,800 ft) above sea level. It appears to be an arboreal species living in bromeliads. The species occurs in the Manú National Park.

== Reproduction ==
The female frog carries her eggs in two pouches on the sides of her body. Scientists saw eggs that were 6.5 mm across. The young emerge out as small froglets, with no free-swimming tadpole stage.

== Threats ==
The IUCN classifies this species as data deficient. In 2009, scientists detected the fungus Batrachochytrium dendrobatidis on some of these frogs in the Kosñipata Valley inside Manu National Park. This fungus causes the dangerous disease chytridiomycosis, which has caused population declines in many species of amphibian in South America.

== Original description ==
- De la Riva I; Chaparro (2005). "A new species of Hyla is described from cloud forests of the Cosnipata Valley in southern Peru". Amphibia-Reptilia. 26 (4): 515–521.
