= Yunganastes ashkapara =

Conservation status
- Endangered (IUCN 3.1)

Scientific classification
- Kingdom: Animalia
- Phylum: Chordata
- Class: Amphibia
- Order: Anura
- Family: Strabomantidae
- Genus: Yunganastes
- Species: Y. ashkapara

Binomial name
- Yunganastes ashkapara (Köhler, 2000)

Synonyms
- Eleutherodactylus ashkapara Köhler, 2000; Pristimantis ashkapara (Köhler, 2000)

Species of amphibian

Yunganastes ashkapara is a species of frog in the family Strabomantidae. It is endemic to Bolivia and is known from the vicinity of its type locality in the Chapare Province (northern Cochabamba Department) and from Abra de la Cruz in the Manuel María Caballero Province (western Santa Cruz Department). The specific name ashkapara is derived from Quechuan ashka meaning "a lot" and para for "rain", and refers to the very high rainfall in the region of the type locality.

== Description ==
Two adult males in the type series measure 44 and 50 mm (1.7 and 2.0 in) in snout–vent length (females are unknown). The head is narrower than the body; the snout is rounded. The tympanum is ovoid and the membrane is barely differentiated. The supra-tympanic fold is low and not obscuring the tympanum. The canthus rostralis is sharp. Neither fingers nor toes have webbing but the toes have weakly defined lateral fringes. The outer fingers have expanded discs; the toe discs are almost as large as these. Dorsal skin is shagreened. There is a prominent pair of dorsolateral folds. The dorsum is brown and has some darker markings. There is a dark brown canthal and supra-tympanic stripe. The upper lip has irregular brown blotches. The venter is cream, bearing some brown spots and blotches. Males have a large vocal sac.

The male advertisement call is a short, single note that sounds like a "clack", as if two hard wooden sticks were beaten together.

== Habitat and conservation ==
Natural habitat of Yunganastes ashkapara is tropical moist montane forest. The forest at the type locality is very rich in epiphytes. The holotype was found calling from a moss-covered branch some 2.5 m (8 ft 2 in) above the ground at 2,100 m (6,900 ft) above sea level, although calls were heard from up to 10 m (33 ft) high in the canopy. Calls of this species were also heard along the road at 1,800–2,150 m (5,910–7,050 ft). The second record is based on an individual climbing a moss-covered rocky wall adjacent to a small stream at 2,360 m (7,740 ft).

This species is potentially threatened by habitat loss (logging). The type locality is within the Carrasco National Park.
