= Sehuencas water frog =

Conservation status
- Critically Endangered (IUCN 3.1)

Scientific classification
- Kingdom: Animalia
- Phylum: Chordata
- Class: Amphibia
- Order: Anura
- Family: Telmatobiidae
- Genus: Telmatobius
- Species: T. yuracare

Binomial name
- Telmatobius yuracare De la Riva, 1994

Species of amphibian

The Sehuencas water frog (Telmatobius yuracare) is a species of frog in the family Telmatobiidae. It is endemic to Bolivia.

== Habitat ==
Scientists observed this aquatic frog in streams, rivers, and ponds in cloud forests high in the Cordillera Oriental mountains between 2050 and 2990 meters above sea level.

Scientists found the frog in one protected place: Parque Nacional Carrasco. They believe it may also live or have lived in Parque Nacional Amboró.

No individuals were encountered in the wild between 2008 and 2019.

== Conservation work ==
The IUCN Red List classifies this species as critically endangered and list its Green Status Assessment as critically depleted, with no more than 49 mature individuals alive at any one time.

Conservation of the Sehuencas water frog has been a focus of the K'ayra Center, run by herpetologist Teresa Camacho Badani at the Museo de Historia Natural Alcide d'Orbigny (MHNC) in Cochabamba.

A single male Sehuencas water frog, nicknamed "Romeo," was collected from the wild in 2009 and housed at the K'ayra Center at the Museo de Historia Natural Alcide d'Orbigny (MHNC). There were fears that Romeo was the last of his kind, an endling. Bolivian conservationists had long been looking for other Sehuencas water frog individuals, particularly females, in hopes of creating a captive breeding program. To raise awareness and money about the plight of the Sehuencas water frog, conservationists from Global Wildlife Conservation and the Bolivian Amphibian Initiative created a profile for Romeo on Match.com, an online dating website. In January 2019, an expedition headed by Badani in a Bolivian cloud forest led to the discovery of five more individuals: three males and two females. The re-discovered frogs will be treated against chytridiomycosis, a fungal disease causing widespread decline of amphibians. After treatment, Romeo was introduced to a female called Juliet. But Romeo died in January 2025 without offspring.

A new population has been discovered in Carrasco National Park, in Bolivia.

There have been concerns that there are too few frogs left in the wild for a sustainable long-term population, and thus captive breeding has been considered the best way to restore the species. After a stable wild population was found, herpetologist Teresa Camacho Badani of the Pontifical Catholic University of Ecuador said conservation efforts are now focused on protecting the species' remaining habitat.
