= Oreobates lundbergi =

Conservation status
- Endangered (IUCN 3.1)

Scientific classification
- Kingdom: Animalia
- Phylum: Chordata
- Class: Amphibia
- Order: Anura
- Clade: Brachycephaloidea
- Family: Craugastoridae
- Genus: Oreobates
- Species: O. lundbergi

Binomial name
- Oreobates lundbergi (Lehr, 2005)

Synonyms
- Eleutherodactylus lundbergi Lehr, 2005; Hypodactylus lundbergi (Lehr, 2005)

Species of amphibian

Oreobates lundbergi is a species of frogs in the family Strabomantidae. It is endemic to central Peru and is known from the Amazonian slopes of the Cordillera Oriental in the Paucartambo District, Pasco.

== Description ==
The type series consists of three adult females, a male, and a juvenile. The male measures 37 mm (1.5 in) and the females 40–49 mm (1.6–1.9 in) in snout–vent length. The snout is long and rounded. The tympanum has prominent annulus. Skin is smooth with low, scattered tubercles on the dorsum. The fingers and toes have small discs and weak lateral fringes but no webbing. The dorsal coloration is tan with diffuse, dark brown blotches and a narrow, dark brown, interrupted mid-dorsal stripe. The throat, chest, belly and extremities are flesh to gray in color.

== Habitat and conservation ==
Its natural habitats are evergreen montane forests at elevations of 1,800–2,760 m (5,910–9,060 ft) above sea level. Specimens have been found on the ground with open vegetation. One specimen escaped to a small hole by which it was sitting. Threats to this species are unknown.
