= Oreobates cruralis =

La Paz robber frog

Conservation status
- Least Concern (IUCN 3.1)

Scientific classification
- Kingdom: Animalia
- Phylum: Chordata
- Class: Amphibia
- Order: Anura
- Clade: Brachycephaloidea
- Family: Craugastoridae
- Genus: Oreobates
- Species: O. cruralis

Binomial name
- Oreobates cruralis (Boulenger, 1902)

Synonyms
- Hylodes granulosus Boulenger, 1903; Eleutherodactylus cruralis (Boulenger, 1903)

Species of amphibian

Oreobates cruralis, also known as the La Paz robber frog, is a species of frog in the family Strabomantidae. It is found in Bolivia, Peru, and possibly Brazil. Its natural habitats are subtropical or tropical moist lowland forest, subtropical or tropical moist montane forest, plantations, rural gardens, and heavily degraded former forest.

== Genetics ==
In 2017, O. cruralis was used as a case study for analyzing species with large genomes, producing the first de novo transcriptome assembly for a South American amphibian. Functional annotation revealed a high proportion of genes associated with the immune system, defense mechanisms, and potential antioxidant activity in internal organs. The data also suggested a potential adaptation for myrmecophagy, though this dietary habit has not yet been confirmed by ecological studies.
