= Oreobates choristolemma =

Conservation status
- Vulnerable (IUCN 3.1)

Scientific classification
- Kingdom: Animalia
- Phylum: Chordata
- Class: Amphibia
- Order: Anura
- Clade: Brachycephaloidea
- Family: Craugastoridae
- Genus: Oreobates
- Species: O. choristolemma

Binomial name
- Oreobates choristolemma (Harvey & Sheehy, 2005)

Synonyms
- Ischnocnema choristolemma Harvey & Sheehy, 2005

Species of amphibian

Oreobates choristolemma is a species of frog in the family Strabomantidae. It is endemic to Bolivia where it is known from its type locality, Serranía de Bella Vista in the Caranavi Province as well as from Sud Yungas Province (both in La Paz Department) and from Chapare Province in the Cochabamba Department.

== Description ==
Oreobates choristolemma are robust frogs with adults measuring 27–46 mm (1.1–1.8 in) in snout–vent length. The head is large and wider than long; the snout is short. The dorsum is brown with darker markings; the skin is granular, with round keratinized granules and small and large warts.

== Habitat ==
Its natural habitat is the humid Yungas forest. The altitudinal range is 1,000–1,500 m (3,300–4,900 ft) asl. The frogs in the type locality were found on the ground near rocky seeps along a densely forested hillside parallel to a large river.
