= Oreobates madidi =

Conservation status
- Least Concern (IUCN 3.1)

Scientific classification
- Kingdom: Animalia
- Phylum: Chordata
- Class: Amphibia
- Order: Anura
- Family: Strabomantidae
- Genus: Oreobates
- Species: O. madidi

Binomial name
- Oreobates madidi (Padial, Gonzáles & De La Riva, 2005)

Synonyms
- Eleutherodactylus madidi Padial, Gonzáles & De La Riva, 2005

Species of frog

Oreobates madidi is a species of frog in the family Strabomantidae. It is endemic to Bolivia. Its natural habitat is subtropical or tropical moist montane forest.
