= Oreobates discoidalis =

Tucuman robber frog

Conservation status
- Data Deficient (IUCN 3.1)

Scientific classification
- Kingdom: Animalia
- Phylum: Chordata
- Class: Amphibia
- Order: Anura
- Family: Strabomantidae
- Genus: Oreobates
- Species: O. discoidalis

Binomial name
- Oreobates discoidalis (Peracca, 1895)

Synonyms
- Hylodes discoidalis Peracca, 1895; Eleutherodactylus discoidalis (Peracca, 1895)

Species of amphibian

Oreobates discoidalis, also known as the Tucuman robber frog, is a species of frog in the family Strabomantidae. It is found on the eastern flanks of the Andes in northern Argentina and Bolivia. Its natural habitat is subtropical or tropical moist montane forest. It is threatened by habitat loss.

== Taxonomy ==
A 2021 phylogenomic study analyzed the relationship between O. discoidalis and the closely related Oreobates barituensis. The researchers found that the two are not genetically distinct and represent a single gene pool. Based on these findings, the authors proposed that O. barituensis should be treated as a synonym of O. discoidalis, attributing the morphological differences previously used to distinguish them to admixture (hybridization) of ancestral lineages.
