= Oreobates sanderi =

Conservation status
- Least Concern (IUCN 3.1)

Scientific classification
- Kingdom: Animalia
- Phylum: Chordata
- Class: Amphibia
- Order: Anura
- Clade: Brachycephaloidea
- Family: Craugastoridae
- Genus: Oreobates
- Species: O. sanderi

Binomial name
- Oreobates sanderi (Padial, Reichle & de la Riva, 2005)

Synonyms
- Ischnocnema sanderi Padial, Reichle & de la Riva, 2005

Species of amphibian

Oreobates sanderi is a species of frog in the family Strabomantidae. It is found in north-western Bolivia (La Paz Department) and nearby south-eastern Peru. It is not considered threatened by the IUCN.

== Description ==
Oreobates sanderi are medium-sized among the Oreobates; adults measure 28–38 mm (1.1–1.5 in) in snout–vent length. The head is large and as wide as long; the snout is short. The dorsum is pale brown to dark brown with cream flecks; the skin is granular, with round keratinized granules and small (only some slightly enlarged), sparse, low, flat warts.

== Habitat ==
Its natural habitat is humid montane forest, such as cloud forest (the Yungas of La Paz Department). These frogs are found on forest litter or the ground near streams.
