= Oreobates sanctaecrucis =

Conservation status
- Least Concern (IUCN 3.1)

Scientific classification
- Kingdom: Animalia
- Phylum: Chordata
- Class: Amphibia
- Order: Anura
- Clade: Brachycephaloidea
- Family: Craugastoridae
- Genus: Oreobates
- Species: O. sanctaecrucis

Binomial name
- Oreobates sanctaecrucis (Harvey & Keck, 1995)

Synonyms
- Ischnocnema sanctaecrucis Harvey & Keck, 1995

Species of amphibian

Ischnocnema sanctaecrucis is a species of frog in the family Strabomantidae. It is endemic to Bolivia where it is known from the Santa Cruz and Cochabamba Departments. It is an uncommon, terrestrial frog inhabiting the Yungas forest (humid montane forest, including cloud forest, of the Andean slopes); it tolerates disturbed habitats. It has been found under rocks; males have been observed perching on small secondary vegetation. It is not considered threatened by the IUCN. Its range includes the Carrasco and Amboró National Parks.

== Description ==
Oreobates sanctaecrucis are medium-sized among the Oreobates; adults measure 35–48 mm (1.4–1.9 in) in snout–vent length. The head is large and wider than long; the snout is short. The dorsum is pale brown to dark brown with cream flecks; the skin is granular, with round keratinized granules and small, sparse, low, flat warts.
