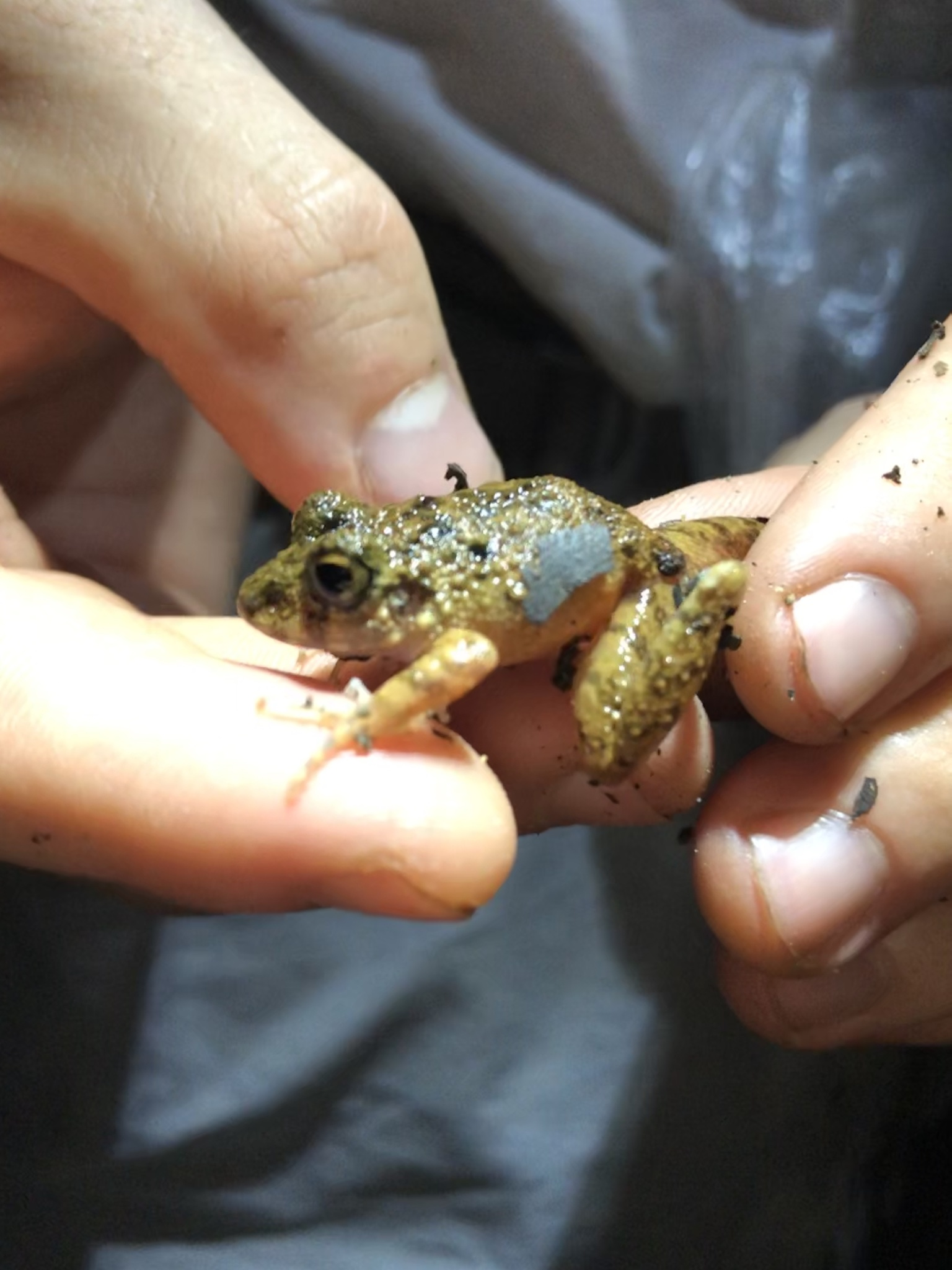
- Oreobates amarakaeri seen at the Manú Learning Centre

Conservation status
- Vulnerable (IUCN 3.1)

Scientific classification
- Kingdom: Animalia
- Phylum: Chordata
- Class: Amphibia
- Order: Anura
- Clade: Brachycephaloidea
- Family: Craugastoridae
- Genus: Oreobates
- Species: O. amarakaeri

Binomial name
- Oreobates amarakaeri Padial, Chaparro, Castroviejo-Fisher, Guayasamin, Lehr, Delgado, Vaira, Teixeira, Aguayo-Vedia, and De la Riva, 2012

= Oreobates amarakaeri =

Amarakaeri Big-headed Frog

Species of amphibian

Oreobates amarakaeri, also known as Amarakaeri's big-headed frog, is a species of frog in the family Strabomantidae, which is endemic to a small region of south-eastern Peru, in the Manú District, and parts of the Puno Region. The frog was first discovered near the Rio Nusinuscato and Rio Mabe rivers in the Andean foothills of the Amarakaeri Communal Reserve, which are tributaries of the Rio Araza. Since then the species has also been found at the Manú Learning Centre and near Bahuaja Sonene National Park, but weren't fully confirmed to be there until 2019 when four specimens were collected at those localities. At the Manú Learning Centre the frog is known to occur mainly in low disturbance and primary forest habitat, but can also be found near streams in more disturbed areas.

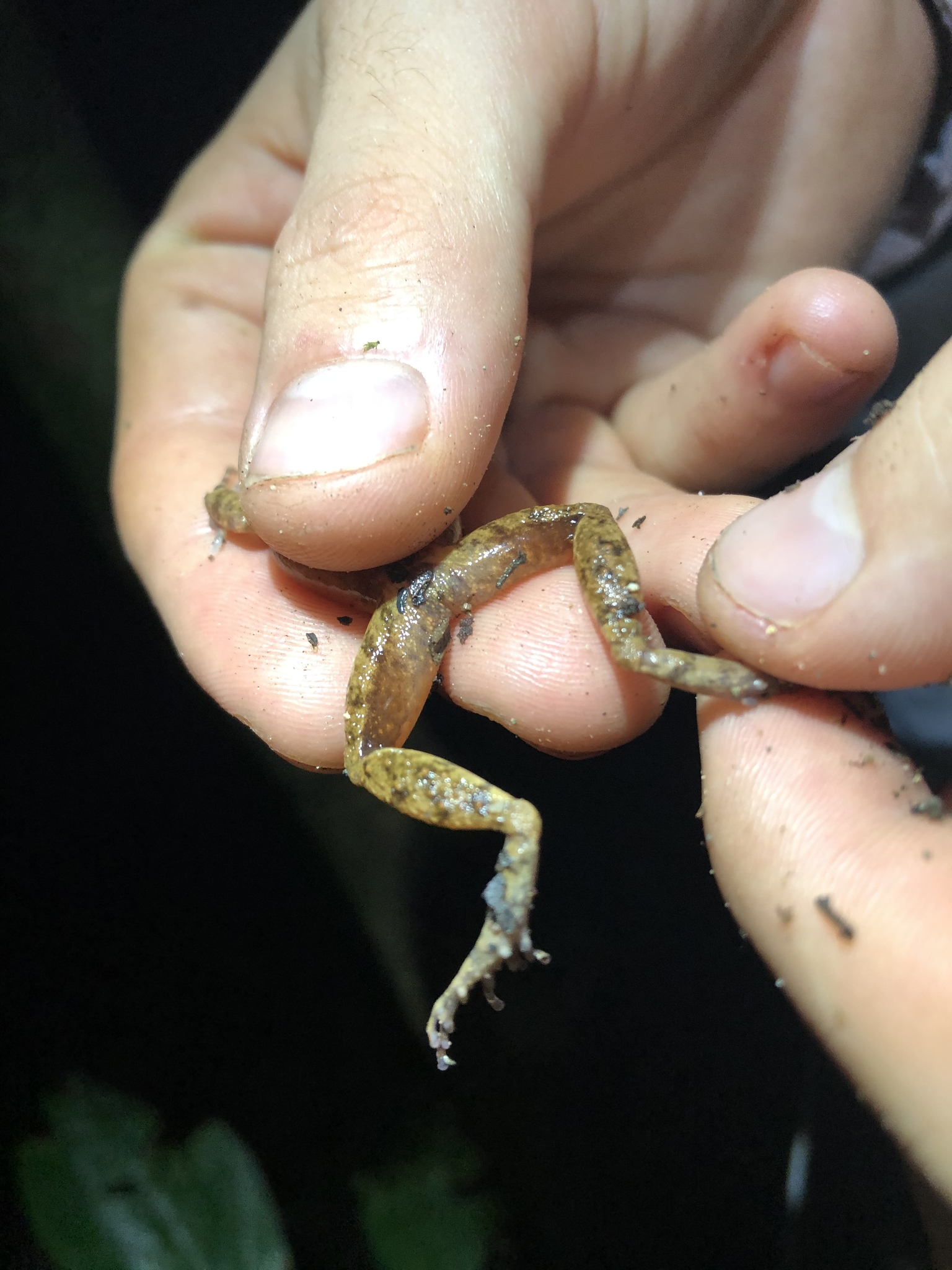
A view of the flash marks of Oreobates amarakaeri.

== Description ==
The Amarakaeri's big-headed frog has a brown dorsum with low warts, a black W-shaped mark which may be absent, and some black spotting. On the face there are lightly darkened lipbars, and on the legs there are transverse darkened bands. The groin, belly, and ventral surfaces of the limbs are orange. Their throats are grey or white with white or orange spots. Two individuals in the Amarakaeri Communal Reserve were found to have a grey belly with orange splotches instead of a primarily orange belly. The iris is golden with fine black reticulations and a black notch at the bottom of the pupil.

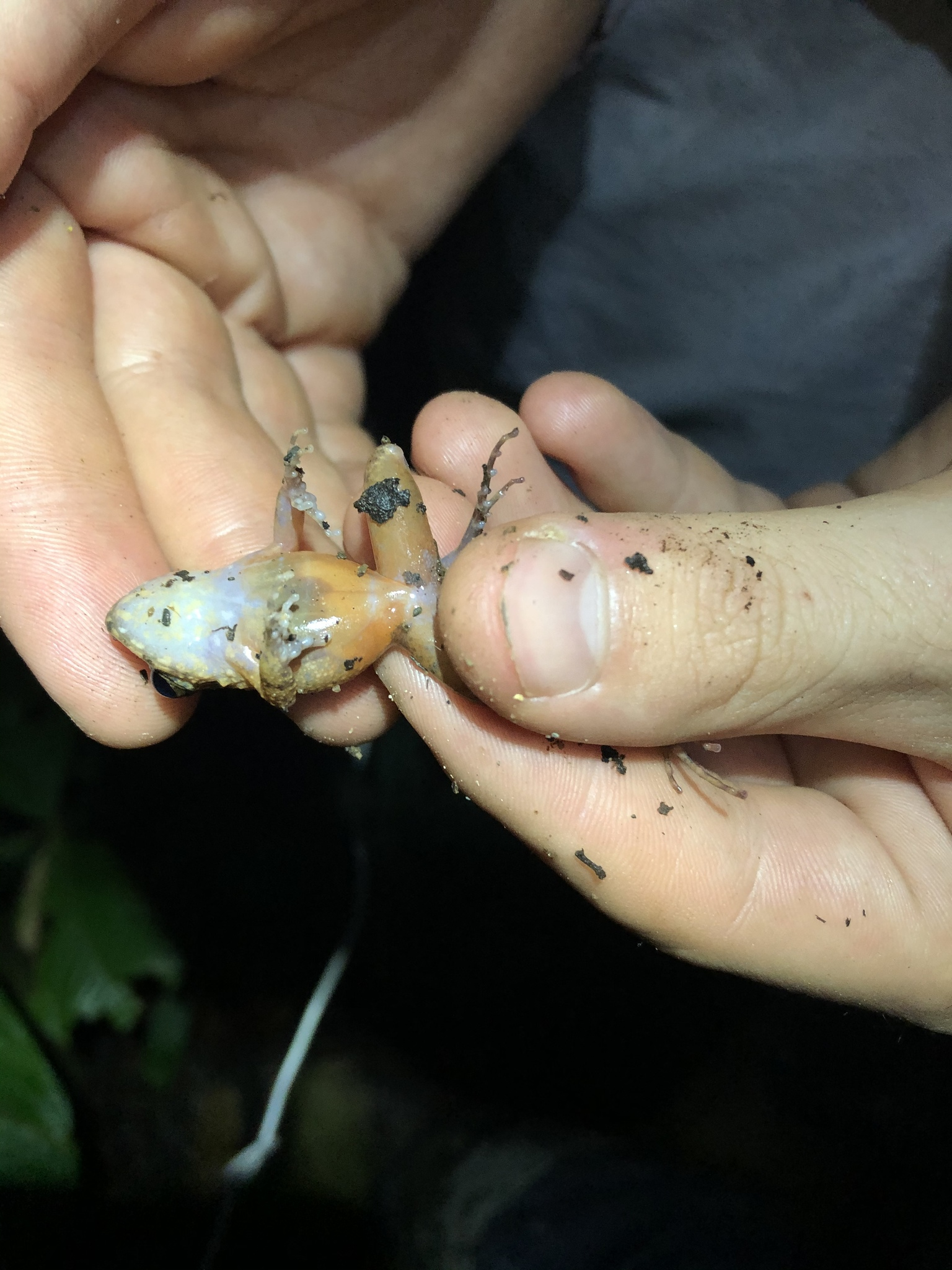
The ventral side of Oreobates amarakaeri
