= Tachymenoides =

Scientific classification
- Kingdom: Animalia
- Phylum: Chordata
- Class: Reptilia
- Order: Squamata
- Suborder: Serpentes
- Family: Colubridae
- Subfamily: Dipsadinae
- Genus: Tachymenoides; Trevine, Grazziotin, Giraudo, Sallaberry-Pincheira, Vianna & Zaher, 2022

Genus of snakes

Tachymenoides is a genus of snakes in the subfamily Dipsadinae of the family Colubridae. The genus is endemic to Peru and contains three species.

== Species ==
The following species are recognized as being valid.

- Tachymenoides affinis (Boulenger, 1896)
- Tachymenoides goodallae Lehr, Lundberg, Cusi, Sites, Torres & Aguilar-Puntriano, 2025
- Tachymenoides harrisonfordi Lehr, Cusi, Fernández, Vera & Catenazzi, 2023

Nota bene: A binomial authority in parentheses indicates that the species was originally described in a genus other than Tachymenoides.
