= Phrynopus montium =

Conservation status
- Endangered (IUCN 3.1)

Scientific classification
- Kingdom: Animalia
- Phylum: Chordata
- Class: Amphibia
- Order: Anura
- Family: Strabomantidae
- Genus: Phrynopus
- Species: P. montium

Binomial name
- Phrynopus montium (Shreve, 1938)

Synonyms
- Syrrhopus montium Shreve, 1938; Niceforonia montia (Shreve, 1938)

Species of frog

Phrynopus montium is a species of frog in the family Strabomantidae. It is endemic to Peru and only known from two localities near Cascas in the Junín Region: "Cascas near Huasahuasi", the imprecisely known type locality where the types were collected in 1936, and south of Hacienda Cascas, where it was found in 2014. Records from the PascoPasco and Huánuco Regions refer to Phrynopus kotosh and Phrynopus oblivius, respectively. Common name Cascas Andes frog has been coined for this species.

== Description ==
The type series consists of four unsexed individuals measuring 21–29 mm (0.83–1.14 in) in length. They were not examined in live condition. In 2014, two females measuring 21 and 26 mm (0.83 and 1.02 in) in snout–vent length were collected. The snout is rounded. The canthus rostralis is distinct and curved. Tympanum is absent. Skin on dorsum and flanks has scattered, low tubercles. In live, the dorsum is pale grayish brown and has a pale, thin mid-dorsal stripe. There are a few small pale yellow spots on each side of the dorsum, sometimes even on the flank. The underside is pale gray. The iris is bronze and has fine black reticulations.

== Habitat and conservation ==
Precise collection details are only known for the 2014 collection. Two specimens were spotted under rocks in an open area with scattered bushes, Sphagnum moss, and bunchgrass (Stipa sp.) at an elevation of 3,493 m (11,460 ft) above sea level. It might inhabit the montane forest adjacent this site.

The International Union for Conservation of Nature (IUCN) assessed Phrynopus montium in 2004 as "endangered", but understanding of its distribution has since markedly changed. The species is not known to occur in any protected area. As large areas of suitable habitat has already been converted to agricultural use, further habitat degradation should be avoided.

Location of the only precisely known record of Phrynopus montium near Huasahuasi, Peru
