= Liolaemus wari =

Conservation status
- Least Concern (IUCN 3.1)

Scientific classification
- Kingdom: Animalia
- Phylum: Chordata
- Class: Reptilia
- Order: Squamata
- Suborder: Iguania
- Family: Liolaemidae
- Genus: Liolaemus
- Species: L. wari

Binomial name
- Liolaemus wari Aguilar, Wood, Cusi, Guzman, Huari, Lundberg, Mortensen, Ramirez, Robles, Suarez, Ticona, Vargas, Venegas, & Sites, 2013

Species of lizard

Liolaemus wari is a species of lizard in the family Iguanidae or the family Liolaemidae. It is endemic to Peru.
