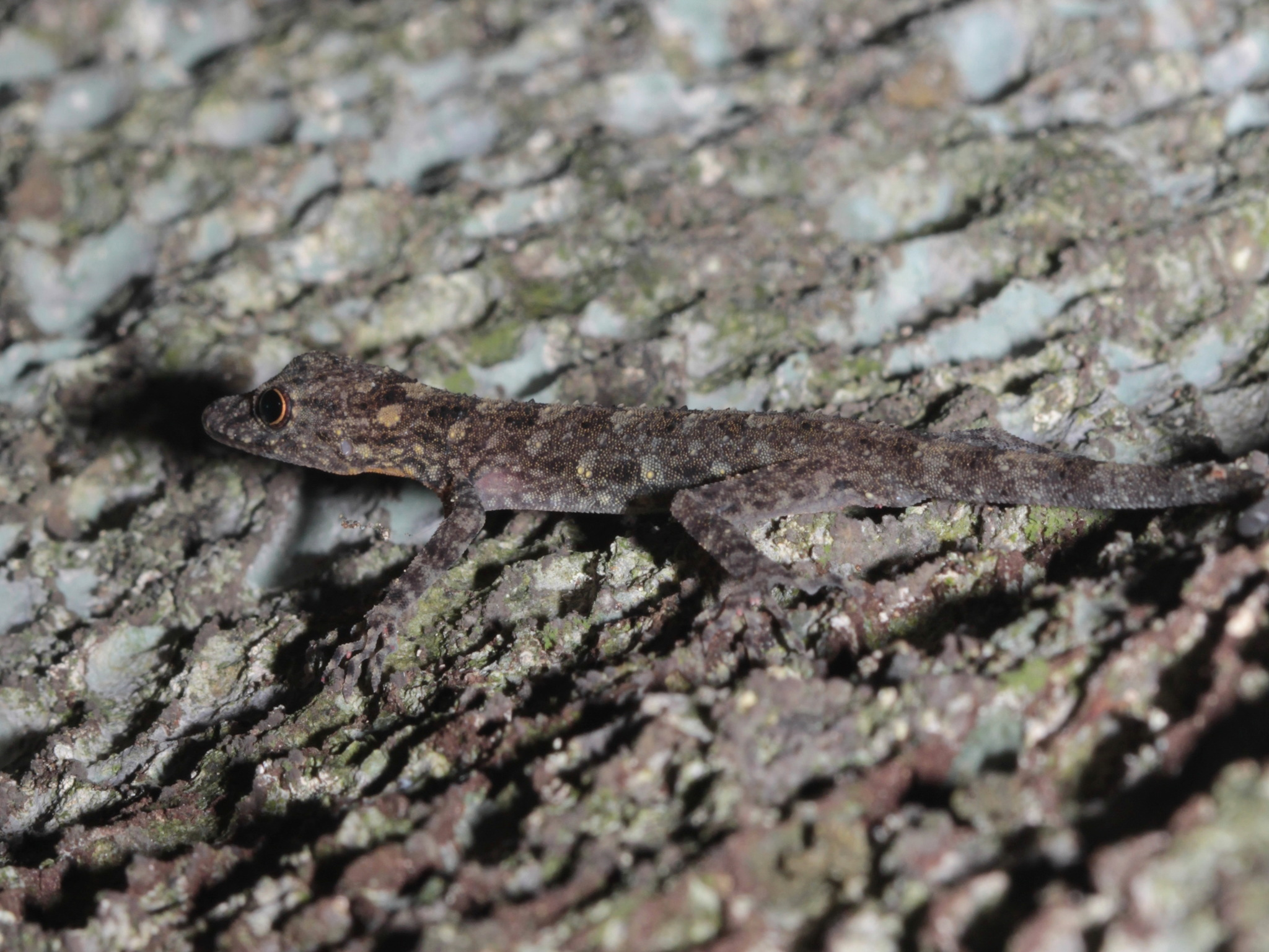

Conservation status
- Near Threatened (IUCN 3.1)

Scientific classification
- Kingdom: Animalia
- Phylum: Chordata
- Class: Reptilia
- Order: Squamata
- Suborder: Gekkota
- Family: Gekkonidae
- Genus: Cnemaspis
- Species: C. thachanaensis

Binomial name
- Cnemaspis thachanaensis Wood, Grismer, Aowphol, Aguilar, Cota, Grismer, Murdoch & Sites, 2017

= Cnemaspis thachanaensis =

Species of lizard

Cnemaspis thachanaensis is a species of geckos endemic to Thailand.
