= Ministry of Environment (Peru) =

Government ministry of Peru

- Ministerio del Ambiente
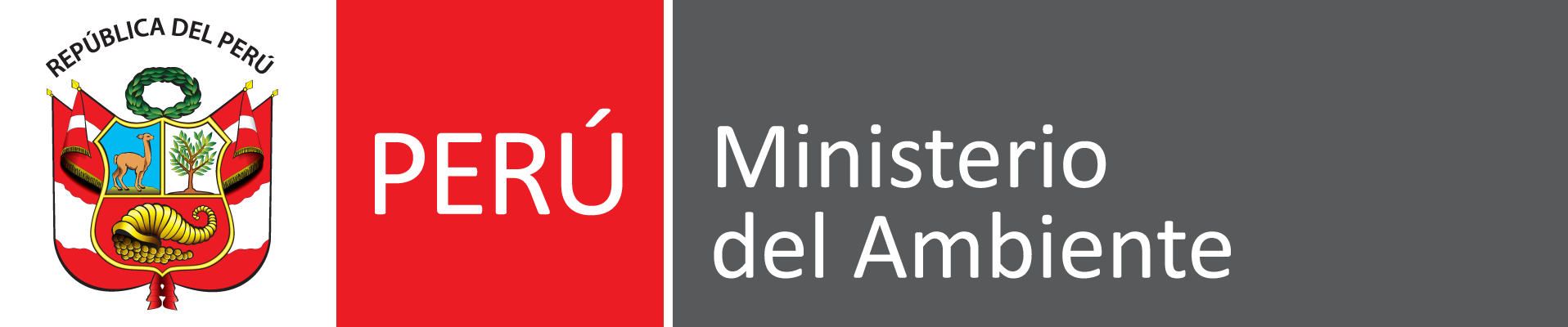

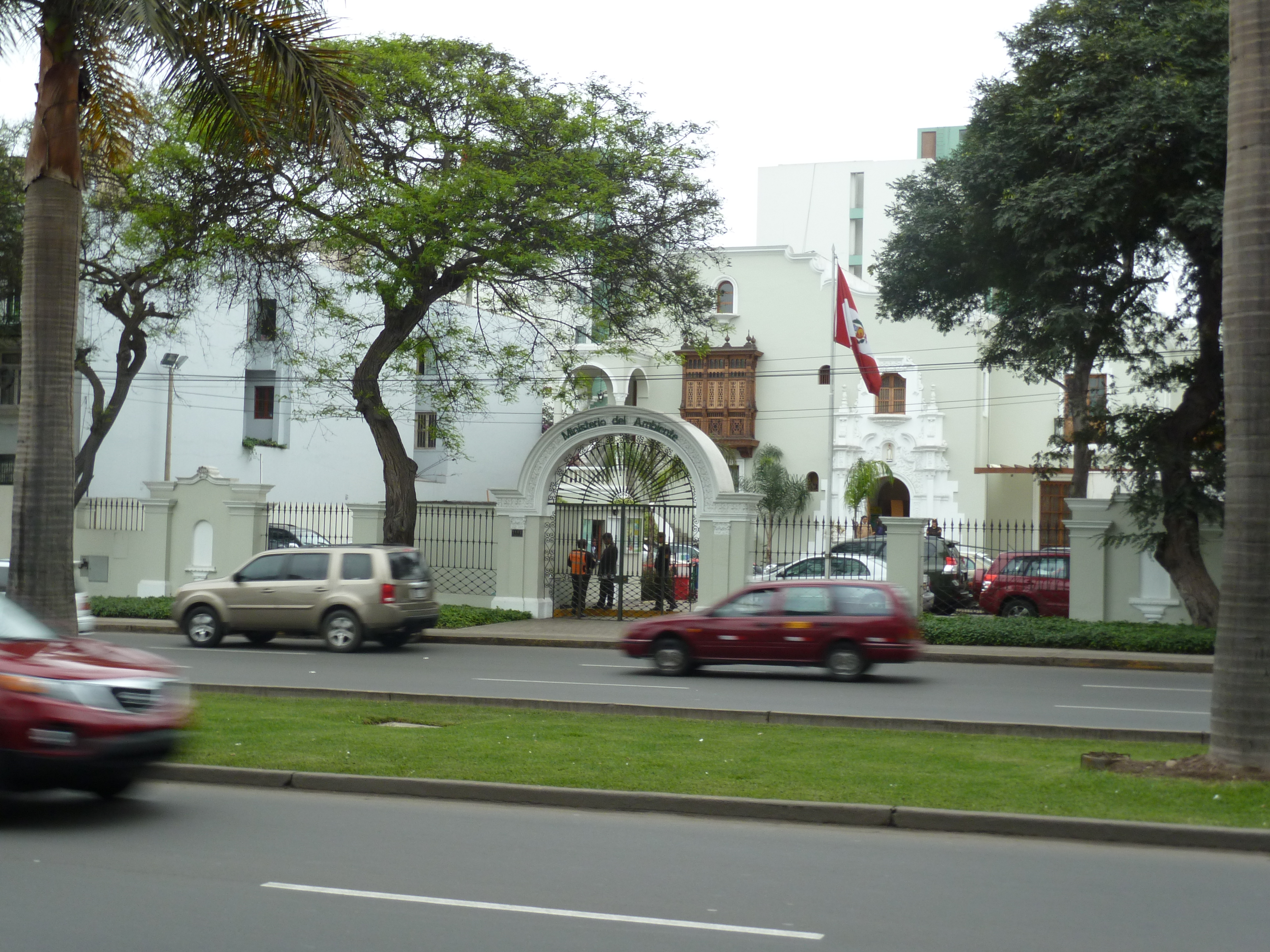

Agency overview
- Formed: 13 May 2008; 18 years ago
- Headquarters: 1440 Javier Prado Oeste, San Isidro, Lima
- Minister responsible: Miguel Ángel Espichán
- Website: www.gob.pe/minam

The Ministry of Environment (Spanish: Ministerio del Ambiente, MINAM) of Peru is the government ministry responsible for the national policy regarding environmental matters. It was created on May 13, 2008. Its function is to oversee the environmental sector of Peru, with the authority to design, establish, and execute government policies concerning the environment. As of 2025, the minister is Miguel Ángel Espichán.

== History ==
It was created on May 13, 2008, months after its creation was proposed, by Legislative Decree No. 1013, and its inaugural holder was Antonio Brack Egg.

Its stated mission is to ensure the sustainable use and conservation of natural resources, as well as the preservation of environmental quality for the benefit of people and the environment, in a normative, effective, decentralized manner, coordinated with public and private organizations and civil society, within the framework of green growth and environmental governance.

== Organisation ==
It has two subdivisions: the Strategic Development of Natural Resources and Environmental Management. It also has an Advisory Commission.

- Vice Ministry of Strategic Development of Natural Resources
- Vice Ministry of Environmental Management
- General Secretariat

Entities administered by the ministry include:

- Peruvian Amazon Research Institute (IIAP)
- National Meteorological and Hydrological Service (SENAMHI)
- Peruvian Geophysical Institute (IGP)
- Environmental Assessment and Oversight Agency (OEFA)
- National Service of Natural Protected Areas (SERNANP)
- National Environmental Certification Service (SENACE)
- National Institute for Research on Glaciers and Mountain Ecosystems (INAIGEM)

== List of ministers ==
No.	Picture	Minister of the Environment	Took office	Left office	President
1.		Antonio Brack Egg	16 May 2008	28 July 2011	Alan García
2.		Ricardo Giesecke	28 July 2011	10 December 2011	Ollanta Humala
3.		Manuel Pulgar-Vidal	10 December 2011	28 July 2016	Ollanta Humala
4.		Elsa Galarza	28 July 2016	2 April 2018	Pedro Pablo Kuczynski
5.		Fabioloa Muñoz	2 April 2018	11 March 2019	Martin Vizcarra Cornejo
6.		Lucía Ruiz	11 March 2019	30 September 2019	Martin Vizcarra Cornejo
7.		Fabioloa Muñoz	3 October 2019	15 July 2020	Martin Vizcarra Cornejo
8.		Kirla Echegaray	15 July 2020	12 November 2020	Martin Vizcarra Cornejo
9.		Lizzet Rojas	12 November 2020	18 November 2020	Manuel Merino
10.		Gabriel Quijandría	18 November 2020	28 July 2021	Francisco Sagasti
11.		Rubén Ramírez Mateo	29 July 2021	1 February 2022	Pedro Castillo
12.		Wilber Supo	1 February 2022	8 February 2022	Pedro Castillo
13.		Modesto Montoya	8 February 2022	24 August 2022	Pedro Castillo
14.		Wilbert Rozas	24 August 2022	7 December 2022	Pedro Castillo
15.	frameles	Albina Ruiz	10 December 2022	13 February 2024	Dina Boluarte
16.		Juan Carlos Castro Vargas	13 February 2024		

== See also ==
- Climate of Peru
- Council of Ministers of Peru
