= Phrynopus horstpauli =

Conservation status
- Endangered (IUCN 3.1)

Scientific classification
- Kingdom: Animalia
- Phylum: Chordata
- Class: Amphibia
- Order: Anura
- Clade: Brachycephaloidea
- Family: Craugastoridae
- Genus: Phrynopus
- Species: P. horstpauli

Binomial name
- Phrynopus horstpauli Lehr, Köhler & Ponce, 2000

Species of frog

Phrynopus horstpauli is a species of frog in the family Strabomantidae. It is endemic to Peru. Its natural habitats are subtropical or tropical moist montane forest, subtropical or tropical high-altitude shrubland, pastureland, and rural gardens. It is threatened by habitat loss.
