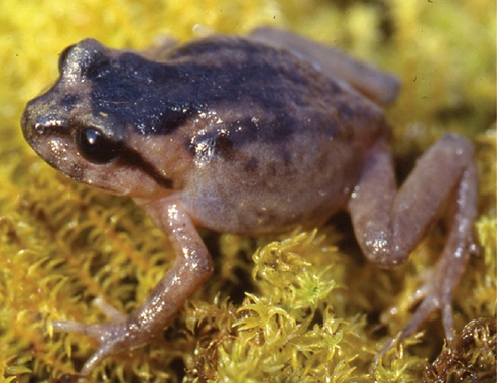

Conservation status
- Endangered (IUCN 3.1)

Scientific classification
- Kingdom: Animalia
- Phylum: Chordata
- Class: Amphibia
- Order: Anura
- Clade: Brachycephaloidea
- Family: Craugastoridae
- Genus: Phrynopus
- Species: P. kauneorum

Binomial name
- Phrynopus kauneorum Lehr, Aguilar, and Köhler, 2002

= Phrynopus kauneorum =

Species of amphibian

Phrynopus kauneorum is a species of frogs in the family Strabomantidae. It is endemic to the Andes of Peru and known from near its type locality in the Pachitea Province, as well as from the Cordillera de Carpish, both in the Huánuco Region. The specific name kauneorum honors Andreas, Meeta, and Rebekka Kaune from Germany.

== Description ==
Only females and juveniles of this species are known. Adult females measure 29–56 mm (1.1–2.2 in) in snout–vent length—the maximum size is very large for the genus. The head is narrow and relatively short. The snout is short and rounded. Tympanum is absent, but the supratympanic fold is distinct. The fingers and toes have no webbing nor lateral fringes; the digital tips are slightly swollen. Skin of the dorsum is smooth. Dorsal coloration is glaucous with sepia blotches and stripes; one stripe runs from the beginning of the nose and extends across the upper eyelid to the inguinal region; another one runs dorsolaterally from behind the supratympanic fold to the middle of body.

== Habitat and conservation ==
Phrynopus kauneorum is a terrestrial frog that occurs in montane cloud forests and forest edges (but not in agricultural land) at elevations of 2,735–3,380 m (8,973–11,089 ft) above sea level. Agricultural activities, primarily potato cultivation and livestock ranching, are the main threats to it. It is not known to occur in any protected areas.
