= Jesus the Worker Agro-industrial Training Center =

Coordinates: 13°40′27.28″S 71°40′41.41″W

Jesus the Worker Agro-industrial Training Center Asociación Jesús Obrero
- Abbreviation: CCAIJO
- Established: 1971; 55 years ago
- Purpose: Integral development of peasantry
- Headquarters: Andahuaylillas city Andahuaylillas District; Quispicanchi Province, Peru
- Region served: Quispicanchi province of Peru
- Affiliations: Jesuit, Catholic
- Website: CCAIJO

Jesus the Worker Agro-industrial Training Center (CCAIJO) was founded by the Jesuits in 1971 among the peasantry in the Quispicanchi Province of Peru. It trains farmers in sustainable development especially in the areas of processing, marketing, environmental care, and water projects along with improved housing and civic participation.

CCAIJO won the Antonio Brack Egg 2015 national award from the Ministry of Environment for its Projects to Confront Climate Change in Rural Areas with the construction of micro-dams.
