= Phrynopus tribulosus =

Conservation status
- Least Concern (IUCN 3.1)

Scientific classification
- Kingdom: Animalia
- Phylum: Chordata
- Class: Amphibia
- Order: Anura
- Family: Strabomantidae
- Genus: Phrynopus
- Species: P. tribulosus

Binomial name
- Phrynopus tribulosus Duellman and Hedges, 2008

Synonyms
- Phrynopus nicoleae Chaparro, Padial, and De la Riva, 2008

Species of frog

Phrynopus tribulosus is a species of frog in the family Strabomantidae. It is endemic to Peru and only known from its type locality near Oxapampa at 2,600 m (8,500 ft) asl, and from Santa Bárbara, in the Huancabamba District, Oxapampa, Pasco Region. It inhabits humid montane forests where individuals could be found deep within a mossy bank by day.

== Description ==
One specimen, now a paratype, is an adult female measuring 21 mm (0.83 in) in snout–vent length. The body is slim. The dorsum is finely granular and has elongate dorsolateral warts that form a long discontinuous row without joining to a fold. There is a conspicuous X-shaped mid-dorsal fold. The supratympanic fold is weak and no tympanum is present. The fingers and toes have no fringes, webbing, or discs, but the finger tips are slightly swollen. Dorsal coloration is tan with various diffuse black blotches and bluish-white dorsal granules. There is a bold black mask running from the snout through the eye and over to the sypratympanic area. The flanks and extremities are tan with abundant bluish-white spots. The lower parts are gray and have small, marmorated, brown, and metallic blue blotches.
