= Phrynopus barthlenae =

Conservation status
- Endangered (IUCN 3.1)

Scientific classification
- Kingdom: Animalia
- Phylum: Chordata
- Class: Amphibia
- Order: Anura
- Clade: Brachycephaloidea
- Family: Craugastoridae
- Genus: Phrynopus
- Species: P. barthlenae

Binomial name
- Phrynopus barthlenae Lehr & Aguilar, 2002

Species of frog

Phrynopus barthlenae is a species of frog in the family Strabomantidae. It is endemic to Peru. Its natural habitats are subtropical or tropical moist montane forest, subtropical or tropical high-altitude grassland, arable land, pastureland, and rural gardens.
