= Anolis cuscoensis =

Conservation status
- Least Concern (IUCN 3.1)

Scientific classification
- Kingdom: Animalia
- Phylum: Chordata
- Class: Reptilia
- Order: Squamata
- Suborder: Iguania
- Family: Anolidae
- Genus: Anolis
- Species: A. cuscoensis

Binomial name
- Anolis cuscoensis Poe, Yañez-Miranda, & Lehr, 2008

Species of lizard

Anolis cuscoensis is a species of lizard in the family Dactyloidae. The species is found in Peru.
