= Phrynopus dagmarae =

Conservation status
- Endangered (IUCN 3.1)

Scientific classification
- Kingdom: Animalia
- Phylum: Chordata
- Class: Amphibia
- Order: Anura
- Clade: Brachycephaloidea
- Family: Craugastoridae
- Genus: Phrynopus
- Species: P. dagmarae

Binomial name
- Phrynopus dagmarae Lehr, Aguilar, and Köhler, 2002

Species of amphibian

Phrynopus dagmarae is a species of frog in the family Strabomantidae. It is endemic to the Andes of Peru and only known from the Pachitea and Ambo Provinces in the Huánuco Region, from near the type locality. The specific name dagmarae honors Dagmar Schramm from Germany.

== Description ==
The type series consists of females and juveniles; males are unknown. Adult females reach 27.3 mm (1.07 in) in snout–vent length. The head is narrow and short. The snout is short and rounded. Tympanum is absent, and the supratympanic fold is weak. The fingers and toes have no webbing nor lateral fringes; the digital tips are slightly swollen. Skin of the dorsum is tuberculate; dorsolateral folds are present. Coloration is variable; dorsal and lateral ground coloration vary in various shades of reds, browns, and greens (cinnamon, grayish horn color, pale pinkish buff, light russet vinaceous, robin rufous, brick red, brussels brown, brownish olive, and peacock green). Ventral coloration is similarly variable (hair brown, lime green, straw yellow, glaucous, sulphur yellow to spectrum orange, Pratt's rufous). Some specimens have middorsal or dorsolateral stripes.

== Habitat and conservation ==
Phrynopus dagmarae is a terrestrial frog that occurs in montane cloud forests and wet shrublands, and formerly in forested wet grassland close to the edge of forest, at elevations of 3,070–3,380 m (10,070–11,090 ft) above sea level. It is an uncommon species. Agricultural activities, especially potato cultivation, are a serious threat to it. It is not known to occur in any protected areas.
