= Phrynopus pesantesi =

Conservation status
- Data Deficient (IUCN 3.1)

Scientific classification
- Kingdom: Animalia
- Phylum: Chordata
- Class: Amphibia
- Order: Anura
- Clade: Brachycephaloidea
- Family: Craugastoridae
- Genus: Phrynopus
- Species: P. pesantesi

Binomial name
- Phrynopus pesantesi Lehr, Lundberg & Aguilar, 2005

Species of frog

Phrynopus pesantesi is a species of frog in the family Strabomantidae. It is endemic to Peru. Its natural habitat is subtropical or tropical high-altitude grassland.
