= Phrynopus heimorum =

Conservation status
- Critically Endangered (IUCN 3.1)

Scientific classification
- Kingdom: Animalia
- Phylum: Chordata
- Class: Amphibia
- Order: Anura
- Clade: Brachycephaloidea
- Family: Craugastoridae
- Genus: Phrynopus
- Species: P. heimorum

Binomial name
- Phrynopus heimorum Lehr, 2001

Species of frog

Phrynopus heimorum is a species of frog in the family Strabomantidae. It is endemic to Peru. Its natural habitats are subtropical or tropical moist montane forest and subtropical or tropical high-altitude shrubland. It is threatened by habitat loss.
