= Gastrotheca stictopleura =

Conservation status
- Endangered (IUCN 3.1)

Scientific classification
- Kingdom: Animalia
- Phylum: Chordata
- Class: Amphibia
- Order: Anura
- Family: Hemiphractidae
- Genus: Gastrotheca
- Species: G. stictopleura

Binomial name
- Gastrotheca stictopleura Duellman, Lehr, and Aguilar, 2001

Species of frog

Gastrotheca stictopleura is a species of frog in the family Hemiphractidae. It is endemic to Peru and known from the southern end of the Cordillera Azul in Huánuco, Pasco, and southern Junín Regions at elevations of 2,500–3,090 m (8,200–10,140 ft) asl.

== Habitat ==
Its natural habitat is humid montane forest and paramo, but it has also been seen near villages and in pastures. It is not known in any protected areas.

== Reproduction ==
The female frog carries her eggs in a pouch on her back. Scientists observed one female with 82 eggs, each about 5.3 mm in diameter. From the number and size of these eggs, scientists infer that the young emerge as tadpoles and complete their development in water.

== Threats ==
The IUCN and the government of Peru classify this frog as endangered. Principal threats are habitat loss associated with deforestation in favor of agriculture, logging, and small-scale wood collection.
