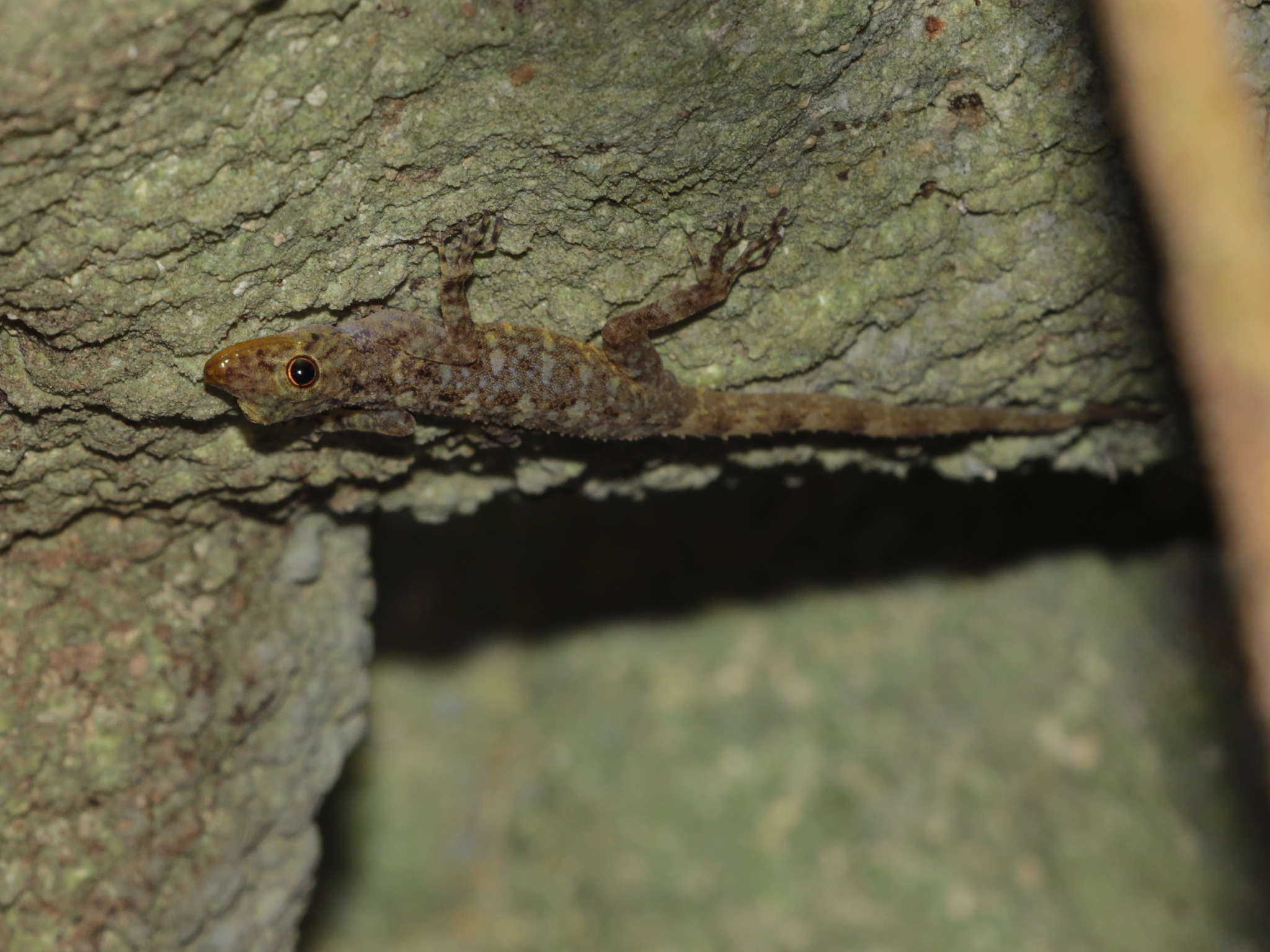

Conservation status
- Least Concern (IUCN 3.1)

Scientific classification
- Kingdom: Animalia
- Phylum: Chordata
- Class: Reptilia
- Order: Squamata
- Suborder: Gekkota
- Family: Gekkonidae
- Genus: Cnemaspis
- Species: C. phangngaensis

Binomial name
- Cnemaspis phangngaensis Wood, Grismer, Aowphol, Aguilar, Cota, Grismer, Murdoch & Sites, 2017

= Cnemaspis phangngaensis =

Species of lizard

Cnemaspis phangngaensis, also known as the Phang Nga rock gecko, is a species of gecko endemic to Thailand.
