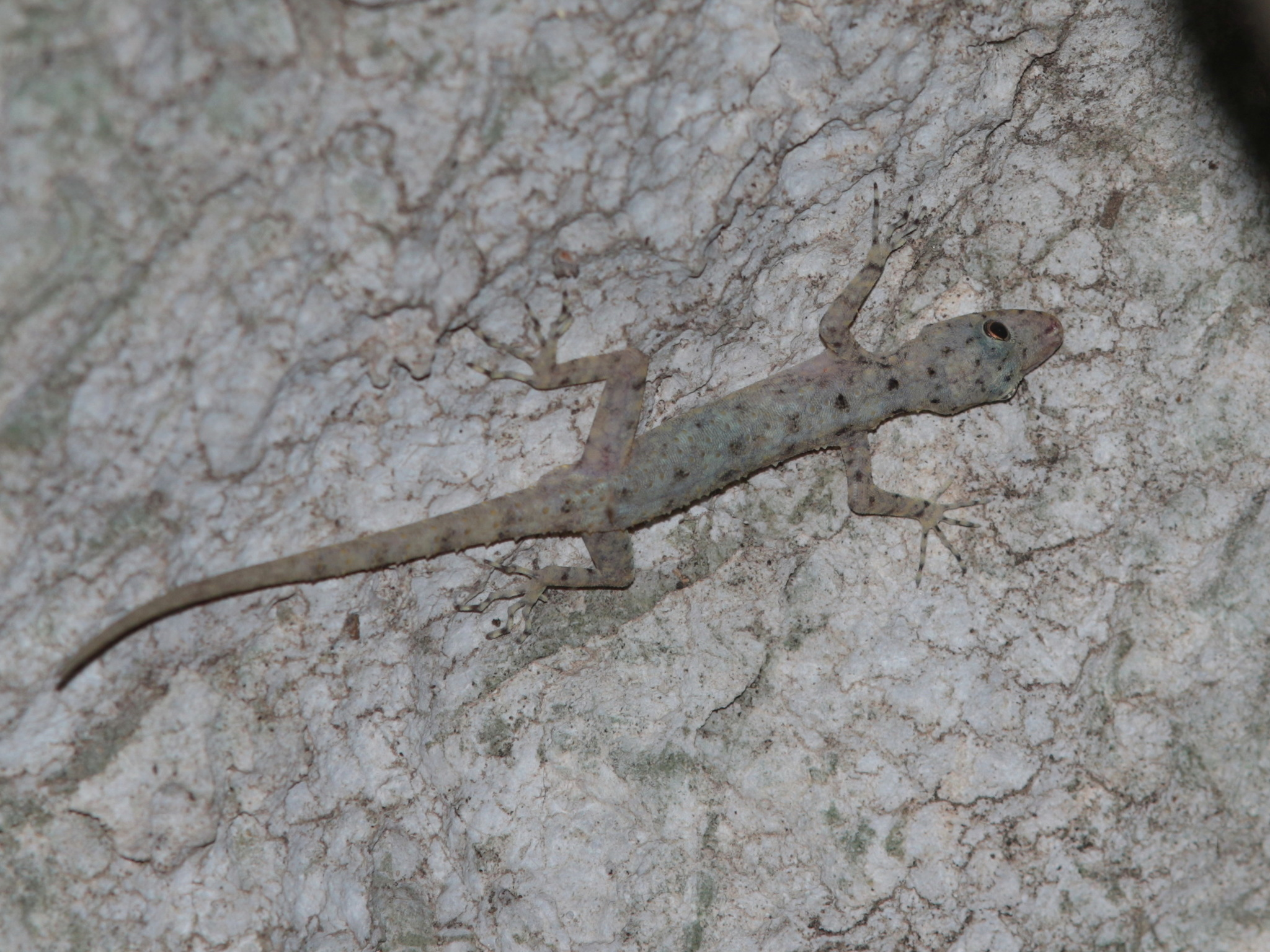

Scientific classification
- Kingdom: Animalia
- Phylum: Chordata
- Class: Reptilia
- Order: Squamata
- Suborder: Gekkota
- Family: Gekkonidae
- Genus: Cnemaspis
- Species: C. lineogularis

Binomial name
- Cnemaspis lineogularis Wood, Grismer, Aowphol, Aguilar, Cota, Grismer, Murdoch & Sites, 2017

= Cnemaspis lineogularis =

Species of lizard

Cnemaspis lineogularis, also known as the stripe-throated rock gecko, is a species of gecko endemic to Thailand.
