= Phrynopus miroslawae =

Conservation status
- Data Deficient (IUCN 3.1)

Scientific classification
- Kingdom: Animalia
- Phylum: Chordata
- Class: Amphibia
- Order: Anura
- Clade: Brachycephaloidea
- Family: Craugastoridae
- Genus: Phrynopus
- Species: P. miroslawae

Binomial name
- Phrynopus miroslawae Chaparro, Padial, and De la Riva, 2008

Species of frog

Phrynopus miroslawae is a species of frog in the family Strabomantidae. It is endemic to Peru and only known from its type locality, Santa Bárbara, in the Huancabamba District, Oxapampa, Pasco Region. The species is only known from the holotype collected in 2007. The specific name miroslawae honors Miroslawa Jagielko from Poland, recognizing her "friendship and support of taxonomic research and nature conservation in Peru".

== Description ==
The holotype is an adult female measuring 29 mm (1.1 in) in snout–vent length. The body is robust. The dorsum is warty and has conspicuous dorsolateral folds and supratympanic fold, but no tympanum is present. The fingers and toes have no fringes, webbing, or discs. Dorsal coloration is gray with some bold black to dark brown blotches. The flanks, ventral surfaces, and dorsolateral folds are mostly creamy-gray with few round black blotches. The iris is bronze with black reticulations.

Phrynopus miroslawae is only known from Santa Bárbara in the Pasco Region, Peru

== Habitat and conservation ==
The holotype was collected from inside moss in elfin forest at 3,363 m (11,033 ft) asl. There is no information on major threats to this species. The type locality is in the Yanachaga–Chemillén National Park.
