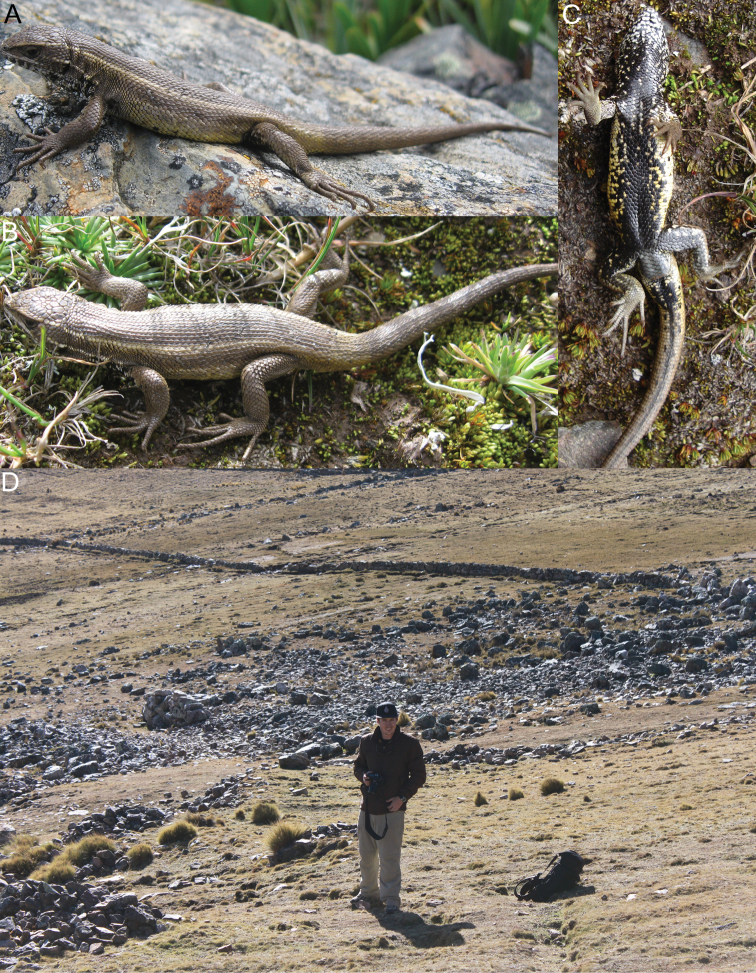

Conservation status
- Least Concern (IUCN 3.1)

Scientific classification
- Kingdom: Animalia
- Phylum: Chordata
- Class: Reptilia
- Order: Squamata
- Suborder: Iguania
- Family: Liolaemidae
- Genus: Liolaemus
- Species: L. pachacutec

Binomial name
- Liolaemus pachacutec Aguilar, Wood, Cusi, Guzman, Huari, Lundberg, Mortensen, Ramí, Robles, Suárez, Ticona, Vargas, Venegas, & Sites, 2013

= Liolaemus pachacutec =

Species of lizard

Liolaemus pachacutec is a species of lizard in the family Liolaemidae. It is endemic to Peru.
