= Phrynopus tautzorum =

Conservation status
- Data Deficient (IUCN 3.1)

Scientific classification
- Kingdom: Animalia
- Phylum: Chordata
- Class: Amphibia
- Order: Anura
- Clade: Brachycephaloidea
- Family: Craugastoridae
- Genus: Phrynopus
- Species: P. tautzorum

Binomial name
- Phrynopus tautzorum Lehr & Aguilar, 2003

Species of frog

Phrynopus tautzorum is a species of frog in the family Strabomantidae. It is endemic to Peru and only known from its type locality near Maraypata, in the Ambo Province, Huánuco Region, at 3,770 m (12,370 ft) asl. It lives in the puna grassland ecoregion. Individuals have found under stones on moist underground. Livestock farming occurred at the type locality, but its impact on this species is unknown.
