= Tachymenoides affinis =

Conservation status
- Least Concern (IUCN 3.1)

Scientific classification
- Kingdom: Animalia
- Phylum: Chordata
- Class: Reptilia
- Order: Squamata
- Suborder: Serpentes
- Family: Colubridae
- Genus: Tachymenoides
- Species: T. affinis

Binomial name
- Tachymenoides affinis (Boulenger, 1896)

Synonyms
- Tachymenis affinis Boulenger, 1896

Species of snake

Tachymenoides affinis, also known commonly as Boulenger's slender snake, is a species of snake in the subfamily Dipsadinae of the family Colubridae. The species is endemic to Peru.

== Taxonomy and etymology ==
The species was first described in 1896, as Tachymenis affinis, by Belgian-British zoologist George Albert Boulenger, who is commemorated in the common name.

== Habitat ==
The natural habitats of Tachymenoides affinis are forest, shrubland, and grassland, at elevations of 2,500–3,300 m (8,200–10,800 ft).

== Description ==
Tachymenoides affinis may attain a snout-to-vent length (SVL) of 436 mm (17.2 in).

== Reproduction ==
Tachymenoides affinis is ovoviviparous.
