= Phrynopus thompsoni =

Conservation status
- Data Deficient (IUCN 3.1)

Scientific classification
- Kingdom: Animalia
- Phylum: Chordata
- Class: Amphibia
- Order: Anura
- Family: Strabomantidae
- Genus: Phrynopus
- Species: P. thompsoni

Binomial name
- Phrynopus thompsoni Duellman, 2000

Species of frog

Phrynopus thompsoni is a species of frog in the family Strabomantidae. It is endemic to Peru.
