= Phrynopus bracki =

Conservation status
- Data Deficient (IUCN 3.1)

Scientific classification
- Kingdom: Animalia
- Phylum: Chordata
- Class: Amphibia
- Order: Anura
- Family: Strabomantidae
- Genus: Phrynopus
- Species: P. bracki

Binomial name
- Phrynopus bracki Hedges, 1990

Species of frog

Phrynopus bracki is a species of frog in the family Strabomantidae. It is endemic to Peru and only known from its type locality in the Cordillera Yanachaga, Pasco Region. The specific name bracki honors Antonio Brack, agronomist and ecologist who was instrumental for the establishment of the Yanachaga–Chemillén National Park. Common name Brack's Andes frog, has been coined for it.

== Description ==
Based on the type series consisting of two adult males and a single female, adult males measure about 15.7–16.2 mm (0.62–0.64 in) and adult females 19.8 mm (0.78 in) in snout–vent length. The head is short and narrower than the body. The snout is rounded to slightly truncate. The canthus rostralis is moderately sharp. There is no tympanum, and also the supra-tympanic fold is absent. The fingers and toes are not expanded; the fingers have slight lateral fringes. No webbing is present. Skin of the dorsum is tuberculate, more so in the males than in the female. The coloration is nearly uniformly black or very dark brown, apart from some faint traces of lighter brown pattern.

The male advertisement call is a two-note call, with the dominant frequency at 2500 Hz.

Phrynopus bracki is only known from the Cordillera Yanachaga in the Pasco Region, Peru

== Habitat and conservation ==
Phrynopus bracki is found in montane cloud and elfin forest at elevations of 2,300–2,700 m (7,500–8,900 ft) above sea level. It is a terrestrial species. The males were found inside curled dead leaves on the forest floor, revealed by their calls, whereas the female was found in leaf litter.

This species is threatened by habitat loss, but most of its range is protected by the Yanachaga–Chemillén National Park.
