= Phrynopus peruanus =

Conservation status
- Critically Endangered (IUCN 3.1)

Scientific classification
- Kingdom: Animalia
- Phylum: Chordata
- Class: Amphibia
- Order: Anura
- Family: Strabomantidae
- Genus: Phrynopus
- Species: P. peruanus

Binomial name
- Phrynopus peruanus Peters, 1873

Species of frog

Phrynopus peruanus is a species of frog in the family Strabomantidae. It is endemic to Peru. Its natural habitat is subtropical or tropical moist montane forests.
