= National Service of Meteorology and Hydrology of Peru =

Government agency in Peru

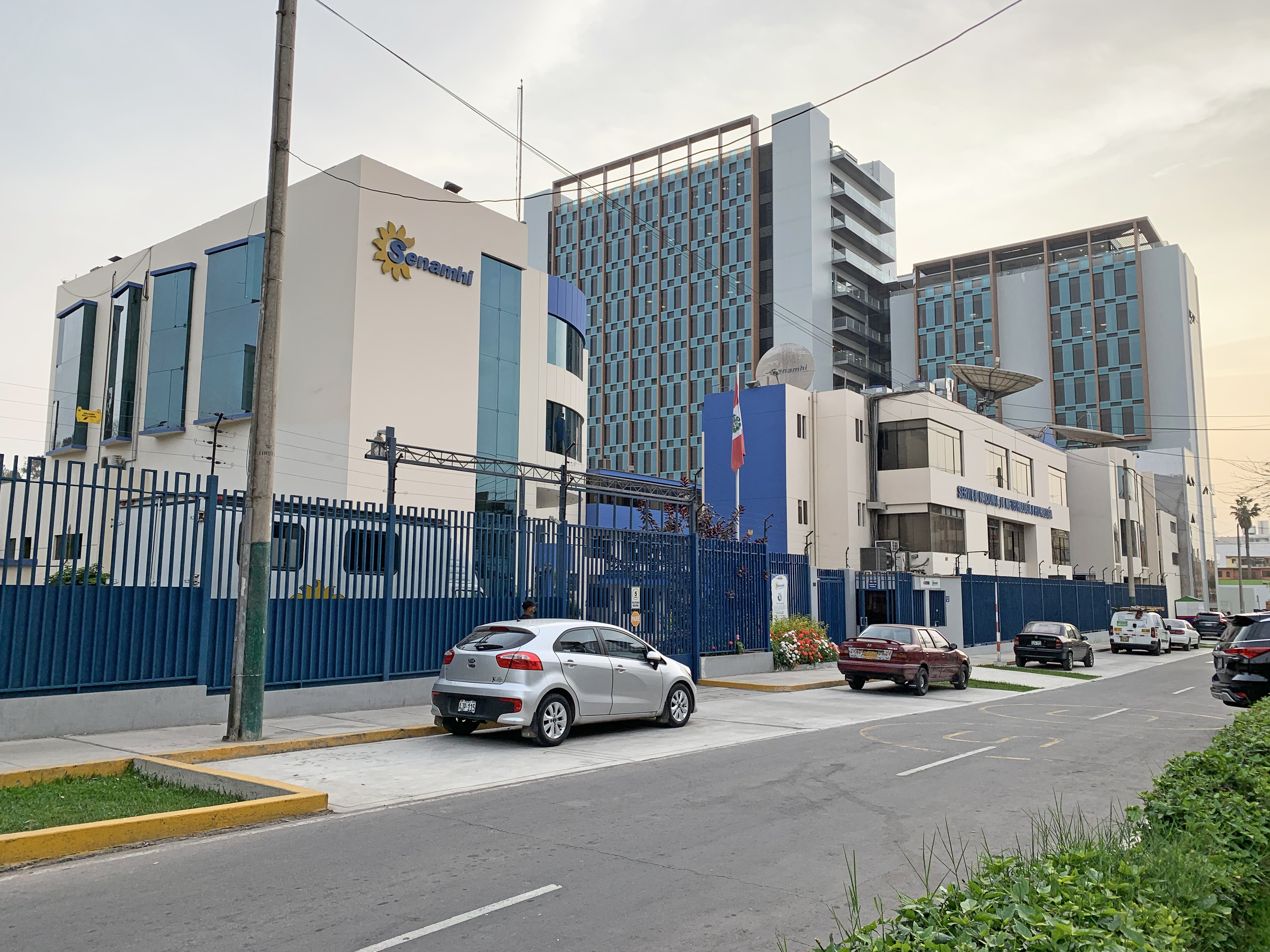
- Abbreviation: SENAMHI
- Established: 25 March 1969 (56 years ago)
- Types: Specialized technical organisation, meteorological service, government agency
- Headquarters: Lima
- Coordinates: 12°04′45″S 77°02′34″W
- Chief Executives: Guillermo Antonio Baigorria Paz
- Parent organisations: Ministry of Environment
- Website: www.gob.pe/senamhi

The National Service of Meteorology and Hydrology of Peru (Spanish: Servicio Nacional de Meteorología e Hidrología del Perú, Senamhi) is a specialised technical organization of the Peruvian State that provides information on weather forecasting, as well as advice and scientific studies in the areas of hydrology, meteorology, agrometeorology and environmental issues.

== History ==
It was created by Decree Law No. 17532, of March 25, 1969, as a decentralised public body. Although its meteorological and hydrological activities were in charge of the ministries of Development and Public Works, Aeronautics and Agriculture, as well as CORPAC.

The organic law of Senamhi was promulgated by Law No. 24031, of December 14, 1984, as OPD of the Ministry of Aeronautics and then of the Ministry of Defence. As of May 13, 2008, it became part of the Ministry of the Environment in accordance with Legislative Decree No. 1013.

== See also ==
- Hydrography
