= Manuel Pulgar-Vidal =

Peruvian lawyer and environmentalist

- Pulgar-Vidal at COP31 (2026)

Minister of Environment
- In office 11 December 2011 – 28 July 2016
- President: Ollanta Humala
- Preceded by: Ricardo Giesecke
- Succeeded by: Elsa Galarza

Personal details
- Born: Lima, Peru
- Education: Pontificia Universidad Católica del Perú
- Occupation: Lawyer

Manuel Gerardo Pedro Pulgar-Vidal Otálora (born 1962) is a Peruvian lawyer specializing in environmental law. During the government of Ollanta Humala, he served as the Minister of the Environment of Peru from December 11, 2011, to July 28, 2016.

== Education ==
He studied at the Faculty of Law of the Pontifical Catholic University of Peru from 1982 to1986, graduating as a lawyer. He pursued a master's degree in Corporate Law at the Peruvian University of Applied Sciences (UPC) from 2001 to 2003.

He has specialized in Environmental Law, with a special emphasis on matters related to environmental management and policy, both in the development of regulatory frameworks and their compliance at national, regional, and local levels.

== Career ==
He has had a professional career in both the public and private sectors. He was a member of the Governing Board of the Environmental Assessment and Enforcement Agency (OEFA); President of the Governing Board of the Permanent Seminar for Agricultural Research (2003–2005); Director of the National Fund for Protected Natural Areas by the State (PROFONANPE) (1994–1998); Director of the Forest Development Promotion Fund (FONDEBOSQUE) and Director of the Equitas Foundation of Santiago.

He was also a member of the Peruvian Environmental Law Society (SPDA), of which he was the executive director from 1994 to 2011. He was also a member of the governing board of the Inter-American Association for Environmental Defense (AIDA), from 1997 to 2004. He has also served as a professor at the Pontifical Catholic University of Peru, the University of Applied Sciences, and the University of the Pacific.

On December 11, 2011, upon the restructuring of President Ollanta Humala's first cabinet, he was sworn in as Minister of the Environment, replacing the resigning Ricardo Giesecke. The presidency of the cabinet was assumed by the then Minister of the Interior, Oscar Valdés.

He chaired the COP20 of the United Nations Framework Convention on Climate Change in 2014.

He remained at the helm of the Ministry until the end of Humala's government. His tenure lasted four years and four months 2011 to 2016, the longest of any minister in that government, which was very prolific in ministerial changes. In the 21st century, he has only been surpassed in duration by Foreign Minister José Antonio García Belaúnde from the second government of Alan García (2006-2011).

As his tenure was coming to an end, he presented the results and contributions of his sector for the period 2011-2016. The reports are titled The conservation of forests in Peru and The fight for legality in mining activities. He also highlighted advancements in environmental inspection, corrective measures, and the penalty system.

After his tenure as minister, Pulgar-Vidal continued his commitment to environmental governance by chairing the International Union for Conservation of Nature’s (IUCN) newly formed Climate Crisis Commission. This role involves coordinating international efforts to address climate change impacts, demonstrating his ongoing influence in global environmental policy.

Pulgar-Vidal has been involved with various international platforms and advisory committees, including the USAID Advisory Committee, where he contributes his expertise to guide U.S. international development policy related to environmental sustainability.

Since 2016, Pulgar-Vidal is the global leader of Climate & Energy for the World Wide Fund for Nature (WWF).

== Awards ==
Pulgar-Vidal is an inductee of the Earth Hall of Fame Kyoto. He was recognized by the French Government with the Légion d´Honneur.
