= Phrynopus kotosh =

Conservation status
- Data Deficient (IUCN 3.1)

Scientific classification
- Kingdom: Animalia
- Phylum: Chordata
- Class: Amphibia
- Order: Anura
- Clade: Brachycephaloidea
- Family: Craugastoridae
- Genus: Phrynopus
- Species: P. kotosh

Binomial name
- Phrynopus kotosh Lehr, 2007

Species of amphibian

Phrynopus kotosh is a species of frog in the family Strabomantidae. It is endemic to Peru and only known from its type locality near Huancapallac, Huánuco Region, at 2,950 m (9,680 ft) asl in the Cordillera Central (Peruvian Andes). The specific name refers to the pre-Columbian culture Kotosh; ruins from this culture are known from the area of the type locality.

== Description ==
Adult males measure 15–17 mm (0.59–0.67 in) and adult females 23–26 mm (0.91–1.02 in) in snout–vent length. The snout is acutely rounded in dorsal view and rounded in lateral view. The tympanum is absent. Skin on dorsum is shagreen and has scattered tubercles and forms thoracical and discontinuous dorsolateral folds. The finger and toe tips are rounded; toes have basal webbing. Coloration in life is unknown; in preservative (ethanol), dorsum and venter are tan and brown mottled, with the venter paler than the dorsum.

== Habitat and conservation ==
The species is only known from the type series collected in 1969, and its natural history is unknown. Deforestation and pollution caused by agriculture and cattle breeding are potential threats.
