= Tachymenoides harrisonfordi =

Scientific classification
- Kingdom: Animalia
- Phylum: Chordata
- Class: Reptilia
- Order: Squamata
- Suborder: Serpentes
- Family: Colubridae
- Genus: Tachymenoides
- Species: T. harrisonfordi

Binomial name
- Tachymenoides harrisonfordi Lehr, Cusi, Fernández, Vera & Catenazzi, 2023

Species of snake

Tachymenoides harrisonfordi, also known commonly as Harrison Ford's slender snake, is a species of snake in the subfamily Dipsadinae of the family Colubridae. The species is endemic to Peru. The species was first described in 2023 and is named after American actor Harrison Ford.

== Description ==
The sole specimen of Tachymenoides harrisonfordi is characteristically yellow with black stripes and has a total length (tail included) of 407 mm (16.0 in).

== Discovery and habitat ==
Tachymenoides harrisonfordi was discovered during a 2022 herpetological survey in the montane puna grasslands of Otishi National Park between the Junín and Cusco regions at an altitude of 3,248 metres (10,656 ft). The survey expedition included researchers from the Peruvian Institute of Herpetology, the National University of San Marcos, the Center for Ornithology and Biodiversity, Illinois Wesleyan University, and Florida International University.

== Reproduction ==
The mode of reproduction of Tachymenoides harrisonfordi is unknown.

== Etymology ==
The species Tachymenis harrisonfordi was named after Harrison Ford due to the actor's work in international conservation, as well as for the hatred for snakes exhibited by the Indiana Jones character.
