= Phrynopus auriculatus =

Conservation status
- Data Deficient (IUCN 3.1)

Scientific classification
- Kingdom: Animalia
- Phylum: Chordata
- Class: Amphibia
- Order: Anura
- Clade: Brachycephaloidea
- Family: Craugastoridae
- Genus: Phrynopus
- Species: P. auriculatus

Binomial name
- Phrynopus auriculatus Duellman & Hedges, 2008

Species of amphibian

Phrynopus auriculatus is a species of frog in the family Strabomantidae. It is endemic to Peru and only known from its type locality near Oxapampa, Pasco, at 2,600 m (8,500 ft) asl. It inhabits humid montane forest.
