= Phrynopus remotum =

Scientific classification
- Kingdom: Animalia
- Phylum: Chordata
- Class: Amphibia
- Order: Anura
- Clade: Brachycephaloidea
- Family: Craugastoridae
- Genus: Phrynopus
- Species: P. remotum

Binomial name
- Phrynopus remotum Chávez, Ayachi & Catenazzi, 2020

Species of amphibian

Phrynopus remotum is a species of frog in the family Strabomantidae. It is native to the central Andes of Peru in the Department of Huánuco at elevations of 3,730 meters. The frog is found in a single locality in a section of highlands adjacent to Marañón Dry valley in habitats such as grasslands, cloud forests, and alongside temporary streams. It can be found under rocks, moss, and other cover. The frog is small, with males reaching 19.3 to 23.3 mm (0.76 to 0.92 in) SVL and females 28.7 mm (1.13 in) SVL. Due to the lack of sufficient water in its habitat, these frogs will lay their eggs in damp areas and the tadpoles will undergo metamorphosis inside the egg, later hatching as fully formed froglets.

The specific name remotum comes from the remote areas the frog is found in, which took over thirty hours of travelling through harsh terrain to reach. The only other amphibian that was found in the same habitat as Phrynopus remotum was the Peru marsupial frog (Gastrotheca peruana), which also does not have aquatic tadpoles.
