= Rhinella chavin =

Conservation status
- Endangered (IUCN 3.1)

Scientific classification
- Kingdom: Animalia
- Phylum: Chordata
- Class: Amphibia
- Order: Anura
- Family: Bufonidae
- Genus: Rhinella
- Species: R. chavin

Binomial name
- Rhinella chavin (Lehr, Köhler, Aguilar, and Ponce, 2001)

Synonyms
- Bufo chavin Lehr, Köhler, Aguilar, and Ponce, 2001; Chaunus chavin (Lehr, Köhler, Aguilar, and Ponce, 2001)

Species of amphibian

Rhinella chavin is a species of toads from family Bufonidae. It is endemic to the Huánuco Region, Peru. It lives in cloud forests of eastern Andean slopes at altitudes of 2,600–3,072 metres (8,530–10,079 ft). It is listed as an endangered species due to a restricted range and threats from habitat loss and water pollution.
