= Phrynopus oblivius =

Conservation status
- Data Deficient (IUCN 3.1)

Scientific classification
- Kingdom: Animalia
- Phylum: Chordata
- Class: Amphibia
- Order: Anura
- Clade: Brachycephaloidea
- Family: Craugastoridae
- Genus: Phrynopus
- Species: P. oblivius

Binomial name
- Phrynopus oblivius Lehr, 2007

Species of amphibian

Phrynopus oblivius is a species of frog in the family Strabomantidae. It is endemic to central Peru and only known from near its type locality near Maraynioc, in the Tarma Province, Junín Region, at about 3,210–3,220 m (10,530–10,560 ft) asl. It is known from a collection in 2005; there has been no later surveys for the species.

== Description ==
Adult males measure 17.5–20 mm (0.69–0.79 in) and adult females 22–24 mm (0.87–0.94 in) in snout–vent length. The snout is short and rounded. The tympanum is absent. The finger and toe tips are rounded; toes have lateral fringes. Skin on dorsum is smooth and has few, small tubercles and forms discoidal folds. The dorsum is dark brown and has small, white spots The venter is reddish brown and has small, white spots. The iris is gold and has golden reticulations. Males have neither vocal sacs nor nuptial pads.

== Habitat and conservation ==
The known specimens were found in remnants of a cloud forest, all beneath rocks next to a small creek. The species shares its habitat with Gastrotheca griswoldi. It is possible that habitat loss is occurring in the general area of type locality.
