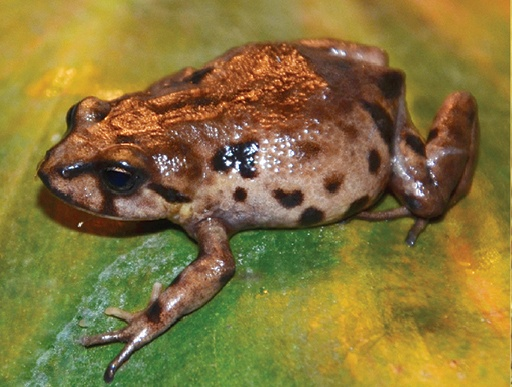

Conservation status
- Critically Endangered (IUCN 3.1)

Scientific classification
- Kingdom: Animalia
- Phylum: Chordata
- Class: Amphibia
- Order: Anura
- Family: Strabomantidae
- Genus: Phrynopus
- Species: P. juninensis

Binomial name
- Phrynopus juninensis (Shreve, 1938)
- Phrynopus juninensis is only known from Cascas in Department of Junín, Peru

Synonyms
- Syrrhopus juninensis Shreve, 1938; Eupsophus juninensis (Shreve, 1938); Telmatobius juninensis (Shreve, 1938)

= Phrynopus juninensis =

Species of frog

Phrynopus juninensis is a species of frog in the family Strabomantidae. It is endemic to Peru and only known from Cascas near Huasihuasi, Department of Junín. Records from Department of Pasco probably belong to another species. Common name Junin Andes frog has been proposed for this species.

== Description ==
A relatively large species of its genus, Phrynopus juninensis males measure 22–31 mm (0.9–1.2 in) and females 33–41 mm (1.3–1.6 in) in snout–vent length. The snout is rounded in lateral view. No tympanum is present. The toes have no webbing. Dorsal coloration is dark brown with tan spots above and silvery-white flecks below. The lips are pale grayish tan with dark brown bars. The iris is bronze. There are dark brown canthal and supratympanic stripes.

== Habitat and conservation ==
Phrynopus juninensis inhabits primary montane cloud forest and forest edges at elevations of about 3,508–3,525 m (11,509–11,565 ft) above sea level. It is a terrestrial species. Development is direct (i.e, there is no free-living larval stage).

Known only from a single location, P. juninensis is an uncommon and rarely seen species. It is threatened by habitat loss caused by agricultural activities. It is also potentially threatened by harvesting of Sphagnum mosses. It is not known to occur in any protected areas.
