= Ricardo Giesecke =

Peruvian physicist

Ricardo Enrique Giesecke Sara-La Fosse
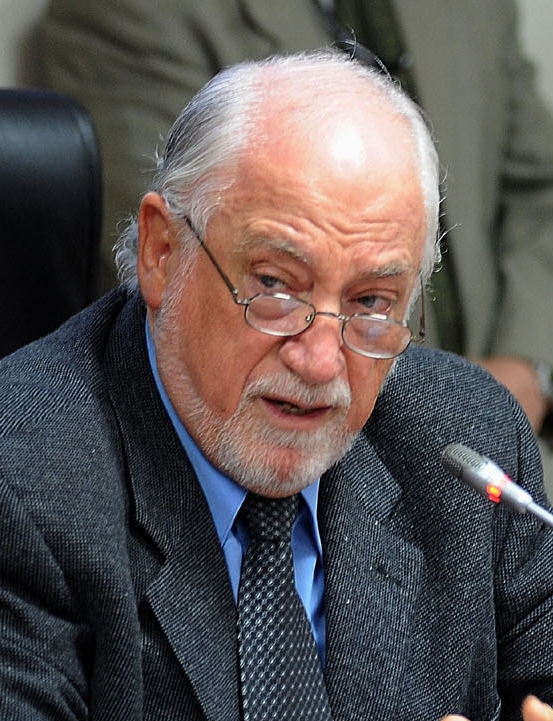

Minister of the Environment of Peru
- In office 28 July 2011 – 10 December 2011
- President: Ollanta Humala
- Preceded by: Antonio Brack Egg
- Succeeded by: Manuel Pulgar-Vidal

Deputy Minister of Energy of Peru
- In office 28 July 1990 – 19 February 1992
- Appointed by: Fernando Sánchez Albavera
- President: Alberto Fujimori

Personal details
- Born: 6 March 1947 (age 79) Huancayo, Peru
- Education: Pontifical Catholic University of Peru
- Profession: Physicist

Ricardo Enrique Giesecke Sara-La Fosse (Huancayo, March 6, 1947) is a Peruvian physicist and expert on environmental issues. He served as the Minister of the Environment of Peru, being a part of the initial cabinet of President Ollanta Humala in 2011.

== Biography ==
Giesecke is the son of Alberto Antonio Giesecke Matto and Elena Sara-Lafosse Valderrama. His grandfather, Albert Giesecke, was an American economist who served as the Rector of the National University of San Antonio Abad.

He graduated with a degree in physics from the Pontifical Catholic University of Peru in 1972. He pursued studies in atomic engineering at the Institut Laue–Langevin of the Nuclear Research Center in Grenoble, France. In 1975, he acquired a certificate in Energy Economics from the Economic and Legal Institute of Energy in Grenoble, affiliated with the University of Sciences and Letters of Grenoble II, France.

Giesecke has specialized in environmental issues and Integrated Project Management. He has held a variety of positions in both the public and private sectors, as well as on an international level.

He has been the Director-General of Planning, Budget, Statistics, and Informatics for the Ministry of Energy and Mines. Additionally, he has served as the Director and General Manager of Petroperú, and the Chairman of the Board of the Central Peru Mining Company, Centromin Perú S.A. (2004-2006).

In August 1990, he was appointed as the Deputy Minister of Energy under the leadership of Minister Fernando Sánchez Albavera during the presidency of Alberto Fujimori. He held this position until 1991.

He also served as the President of the Transfer Commission of the Ministry of the Environment, Coordinator of the Andean Community in Peru, and Chief of the Climate Change and Air Quality Unit of the National Environmental Council (CONAM) and subsequently of the Ministry of the Environment (2007-2008).

=== Minister of the Environment ===
On July 28, 2011, Ricardo was sworn in as the Minister of the Environment, joining the inaugural cabinet of President Ollanta Humala led by Salomón Lerner Ghitis He thus became the second minister of this department, established in 2008 during the second term of President Alan García. He had disagreements with the Minister of Agriculture over the management of the National Water Authority, and with the Minister of Energy and Mines over the management of environmental impact studies, believing both responsibilities should fall under the jurisdiction of the Ministry of the Environment.

He resigned on December 10, 2011, along with other cabinet members. The cabinet was subsequently reshuffled the following day with Oscar Valdés assuming the role of the new prime minister.
