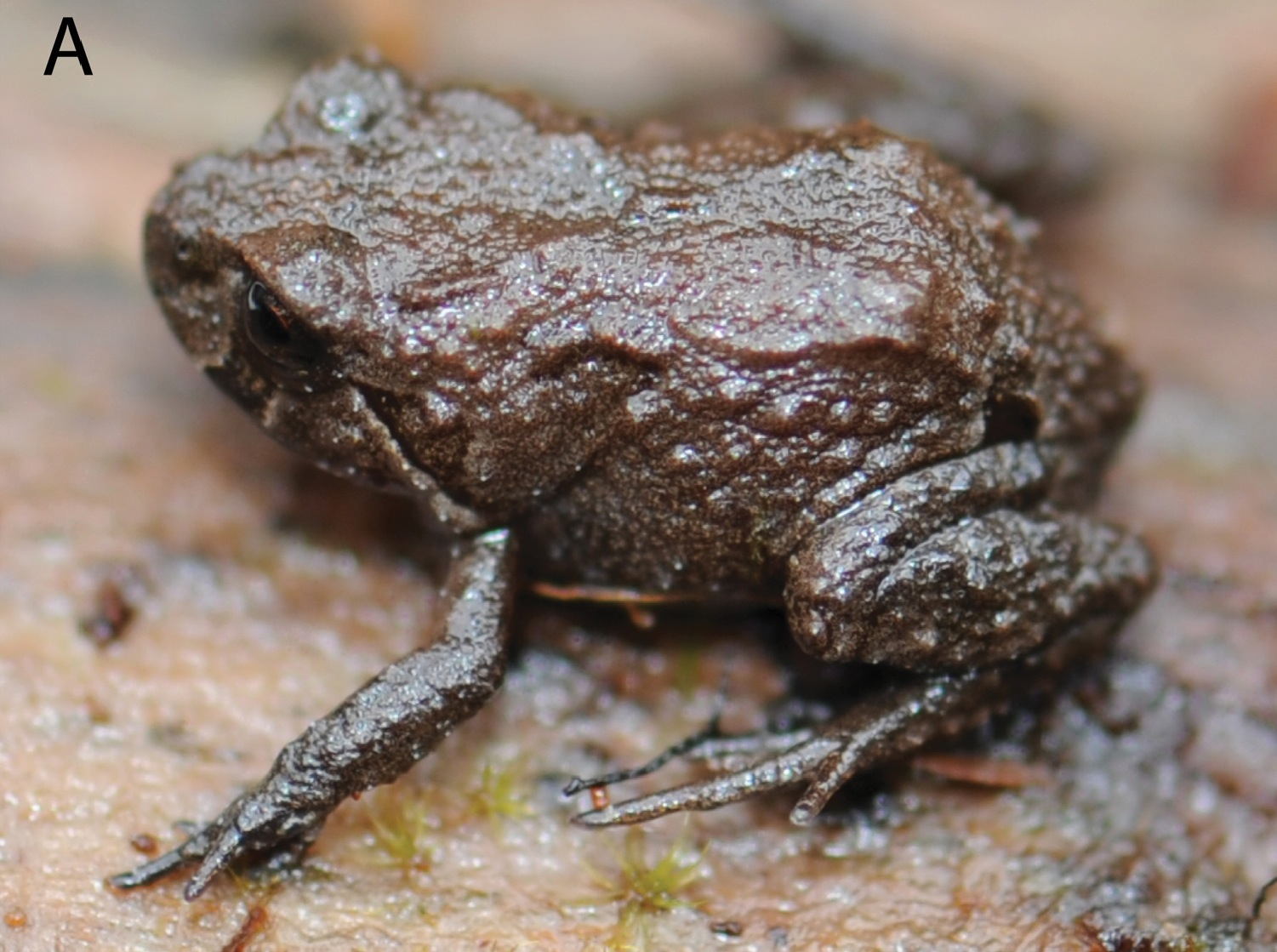
- Phrynopus badius

Scientific classification
- Kingdom: Animalia
- Phylum: Chordata
- Class: Amphibia
- Order: Anura
- Clade: Brachycephaloidea
- Family: Craugastoridae
- Subfamily: Pristimantinae
- Genus: Phrynopus; Peters, 1873

Type species
- Phrynopus peruanus Peters, 1873

Diversity
- 35 species (see text)

= Phrynopus =

Genus of amphibians

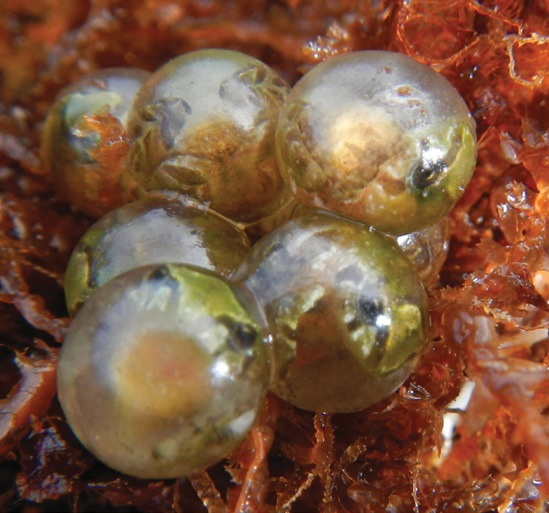
Eggs of Phrynopus curator

Phrynopus is a genus of frogs of the family Craugastoridae. Their common name is Andes frogs. They are endemic to Peru and inhabit the upper humid montane forest and supra-treeline grassland in the Cordillera Oriental, with one record from the Peruvian Cordillera Occidental.

== Taxonomy ==
The contents and phylogenetic position of Phrynopus have long been uncertain, and many species once included in this genus have now been moved to other genera (Bryophryne, Lynchius, Isodactylus (now Hypodactylus), Noblella, Niceforonia, and Psychrophrynella). Hedges and colleagues placed it in 2008 in the family Strabomantidae, subfamily Strabomantinae.

== Description ==
Phrynopus are small to medium-sized frogs, from 14.5 mm (0.57 in) snout–vent length in Phrynopus auriculatus to 54 mm (2.1 in) in Phrynopus kauneorum. Head is narrower than the body. Differentiated tympanic membrane and tympanic annulus are usually absent, except in Phrynopus auriculatus and Phrynopus peruanus. Dorsum is smooth to pustulate. Venter is smooth or areolate.

== Species ==
The following 39 species are recognised in the genus Phrynopus:

- Phrynopus anancites Rodríguez and Catenazzi, 2017
- Phrynopus apumantarum Chávez, García Ayachi, and Catenazzi, 2023
- Phrynopus auriculatus Duellman and Hedges, 2008
- Phrynopus badius Lehr, Moravec, and Cusi, 2012
- Phrynopus barthlenae Lehr and Aguilar, 2002
- Phrynopus bracki Hedges, 1990
- Phrynopus bufoides Lehr, Lundberg, and Aguilar, 2005
- Phrynopus capitalis Rodríguez and Catenazzi, 2017
- Phrynopus chaparroi Mamani and Malqui, 2014
- Phrynopus daemon Chávez, Santa Cruz, Rodríguez, and Lehr, 2015
- Phrynopus dagmarae Lehr, Aguilar, and Köhler, 2002
- Phrynopus dumicola Rodríguez and Catenazzi, 2017
- Phrynopus heimorum Lehr, 2001
- Phrynopus horstpauli Lehr, Köhler, and Ponce, 2000
- Phrynopus interstinctus Lehr and Oróz, 2012
- Phrynopus inti Lehr, von May, Moravec, and Cusi, 2017
- Phrynopus juninensis (Shreve, 1938)
- Phrynopus kauneorum Lehr, Aguilar, and Köhler, 2002
- Phrynopus kotosh Lehr, 2007
- Phrynopus lapidoides Lehr and Rodríguez, 2017
- Phrynopus lechriorhynchus Trueb and Lehr, 2008
- Phrynopus manuelriosi Venegas, García Ayachi, Lujan, Durán, and Motta, 2025
- Phrynopus mariellaleo Venegas, Barboza, De la Riva, and Padial, 2018
- Phrynopus melanoinguinis Venegas, García Ayachi, Lujan, Durán, and Motta, 2025
- Phrynopus miroslawae Chaparro, Padial, and De la Riva, 2008
- Phrynopus montium (Shreve, 1938)
- Phrynopus oblivius Lehr, 2007
- Phrynopus paucari Lehr, Lundberg, and Aguilar, 2005
- Phrynopus personatus Rodríguez and Catenazzi, 2017
- Phrynopus peruanus Peters, 1873
- Phrynopus pesantesi Lehr, Lundberg, and Aguilar, 2005
- Phrynopus remotum Chávez, García Ayachi, and Catenazzi, 2020
- Phrynopus sancristobali Díaz, Mamani, and Catenazzi, 2023
- Phrynopus tautzorum Lehr and Aguilar, 2003
- Phrynopus thompsoni Duellman, 2000
- Phrynopus tribulosus Duellman and Hedges, 2008
- Phrynopus unchog Lehr and Rodríguez, 2017
- Phrynopus valquii Chávez, Santa Cruz, Rodríguez, and Lehr, 2015
- Phrynopus vestigiatus Lehr and Oróz, 2012
