= Antonio Brack Egg =

Peruvian politician (1940–2014)

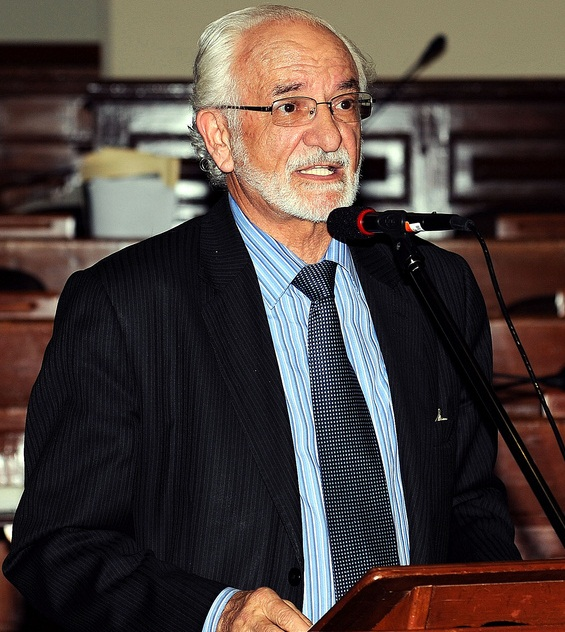

1st Minister of the Environment of Peru
- In office 16 May 2008 – 28 July 2011
- President: Alan García Pérez
- Preceded by: Office created
- Succeeded by: Ricardo Giesecke

Personal details
- Born: 3 June 1940 Oxapampa, Peru
- Died: 30 December 2014 (aged 74) Lima, Peru
- Party: Independent
- Education: Salesian Normal School of Chosica; University of Würzburg

Antonio José Brack Egg (3 June 1940 – 30 December 2014) was an agronomist engineer, an ecologist, and researcher. He was the first Peruvian Minister of the Environment. He is a national and international authority on issues pertaining to biological diversity and biocommercial development. He died after a brief hospitalization in 2014.

Brack's Andes frog (Phrynopus bracki), a tiny frog occurring in the Yanachaga–Chemillén National Park that Brack help to establish, is named in his honor.

He was recognized with the Barbara D’Achille National Environment Award of Peru in 1996. He was awarded the Esteban Campodónico Prize in 2004 for his work in service to Peruvian society.

== Bibliography ==
- El ambiente en que vivimos (1975)
- Desarrollo sostenido de la selva: un manual técnico para promotores y extensionistas Perú (1990)
- La sierra del Perú: pobreza y posibilidades (1994)
- Amazonía: desarrollo y sustentabilidad (1994–1995)
- Gran geografía del Perú: naturaleza y hombre (1996)
- Kuntursuyu: el territorio del condor (1996)
- Uturunkusuyo: el territorio del jaguar (1996)
- Pobreza y manejo adecuado de los recursos en la Amazonía peruana: respuesta (1997)
- Amazonía peruana comunidades indígenas, conocimientos y tierras tituladas: atlas y base de datos (1997)
- Dinámicas territoriales: afirmación de las ciudades intermedias y surgimiento de los espacios locales (1999)
- Diccionario enciclopédico de las plantas útiles del Perú (1999), Centro Bartolomé de Las Casas, ISBN 9972691217
- Biodiversidad y ambiente en el Perú (2000)
- El medio ambiente en el Perú (2000)
- Ecología del Perú (2000)
- Perú maravilloso (2002)
- Legado del Perú andino (2002)
- Perú: diez mil años de domesticación - plantas y animales domésticados - láminas didácticas (2003)
- Perú: diez mil años de domesticación (2003)
- Perú: País de bosques (incluyen fotografías hechas por el autor) (2009)
