= Huancabamba District, Oxapampa =

Coordinates: 10.4289°S 75.5226°W

Huancabamba Wankapampa
- District
- Interactive map of Huancabamba
- Country: Peru
- Region: Pasco
- Province: Oxapampa
- Founded: November 27, 1944
- Capital: Huancabamba

Government
  - Mayor: León Alfredo Raymundo Justiniano

Area
  - Total: 1,161.78 km^{2} (448.57 sq mi)
- Elevation: 1,666 m (5,466 ft)

Population (2005 census)
  - Total: 6,810
  - Density: 5.86/km^{2} (15.2/sq mi)
- Time zone: UTC-5 (PET)
- UBIGEO: 190303

Huancabamba District is one of eight districts of the province Oxapampa in Peru.

== Places of interest ==
- Yanachaga–Chemillén National Park
