= César Augusto Aguilar Puntriano =

Peruvian herpetologist (born 1971)

- Born: 1971
- Known for: Descriptions of new amphibian and reptile taxa
- Scientific career
- Fields: Zoology, Herpetology
- Workplaces: Museo de Historia Natural Javier Prado, National University of San Marcos

César Augusto Aguilar Puntriano also written as César Aguilar-Puntriano (born 1971) is a Peruvian zoologist, herpetologist, and professor.

He conducts academic and scientific work in the Department of Herpetology at the Museo de Historia Natural Javier Prado of the National University of San Marcos in Lima, Peru. A total of 25 taxon names are authored by Aguilar Puntriano.

== Work ==
=== Selected taxa described ===
- Epictia alfredschmidti Lehr, Wallach, Köhler & Aguilar, 2002
- Gastrotheca stictopleura Duellman, Lehr & Aguilar, 2001
- Noblella duellmani (Lehr, Aguilar & Lundberg, 2004)
- Nymphargus mixomaculatus (Guayasamin, Lehr, Rodríguez & Aguilar, 2006)
- Phrynopus barthlenae Lehr & Aguilar, 2002
- Phrynopus bufoides Lehr, Lundberg & Aguilar, 2005
- Phrynopus dagmarae Lehr, Aguilar & Köhler, 2002
- Phrynopus kauneorum Lehr, Aguilar & Köhler, 2002
- Phrynopus paucari Lehr, Lundberg & Aguilar, 2005
- Phrynopus pesantesi Lehr, Lundberg & Aguilar, 2005
- Phrynopus tautzorum Lehr & Aguilar, 2003
- Pristimantis aquilonaris Lehr, Aguilar, Siu-Ting & Jordán, 2007
- Pristimantis bellator Lehr, Aguilar, Siu-Ting & Jordán, 2007
- Pristimantis caeruleonotus Lehr, Aguilar, Siu-Ting & Jordán, 2007
- Pristimantis cruciocularis (Lehr, Lundberg, Aguilar & von May, 2006)
- Pristimantis flavobracatus (Lehr, Lundberg, Aguilar & von May, 2006)
- Pristimantis ornatus (Lehr, Lundberg, Aguilar & von May, 2006)
- Pristimantis pardalinus (Lehr, Lundberg, Aguilar & von May, 2006)
- Pristimantis sagittulus (Lehr, Aguilar & Duellman, 2004)
- Rhinella chavin (Lehr, Köhler, Aguilar & Ponce, 2001)
