= Edgar Lehr =

German herpetologist (born 1969)

- Born: June 30, 1969 (age 57)
- Education: Johannes Gutenberg University Mainz
- Known for: Neotropical herpetofauna research, discovery of Noblella pygmaea
- Scientific career
- Fields: Herpetology, Conservation biology
- Institutions: Senckenberg Naturhistorische Sammlungen Dresden

Edgar Lehr (born 30 June 1969) is a German herpetologist and conservationist. His research focuses on the biogeography of neotropical herpetofauna.

== Biography ==
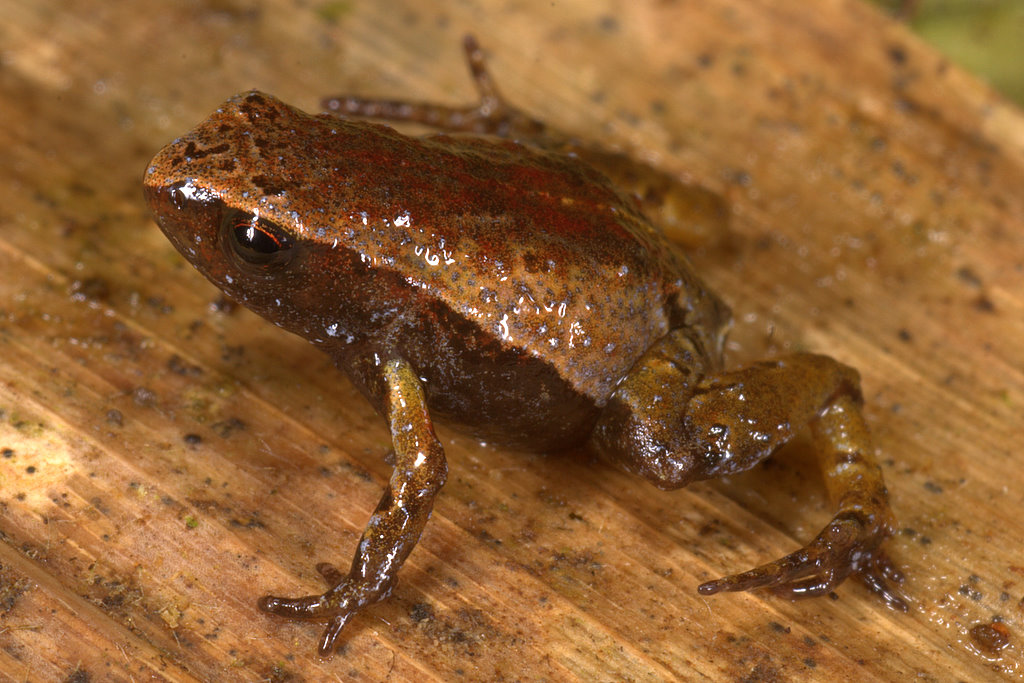
Noblella pygmaea, discovered by Edgar Lehr in 2009

After completing his civil service in a nursing home, Lehr studied biology from 1990 to 1996 at the Johannes Gutenberg University Mainz, earning his diploma in biology. His thesis, On the intraspecific variability of the Indochinese box turtle Cuora galbinifrons (Testudines: Emydidae) Bourret, 1939, earned him a master's degree in 1996. In 2001, he received a doctorate (Dr. phil. nat.), magna cum laude, in zoology with the dissertation The herpetofauna along the 10th parallel of Peru: species inventory, taxonomy, ecological notes, and biogeographical relationships.

From 2005 to 2006, he worked as a research assistant in the Department of Herpetology at the Natural History Museum and Biodiversity Research Center at the University of Kansas. Since 2007, Lehr has been curator of herpetology at the Senckenberg Natural History Collections Dresden. In 2008, he earned his habilitation at the University of Koblenz-Landau with the thesis On the taxonomy, morphology, and phylogeny of strabomantid frogs in Peru.

Since 1993, Lehr has participated in herpetological expeditions to Vietnam, Cambodia, and Peru. In Peru, he supports amphibian conservation projects, while in Laos, Vietnam, and Cambodia, he is involved in turtle conservation. He has described several new species of toads and South American frogs from Peru, including Bufo chavin and several taxa of the genus Phrynopus. Together with Swiss-Peruvian herpetologist Alessandro Catenazzi, Lehr discovered Noblella pygmaea in 2009, the smallest known species of Andean frog.

In 2023, Lehr named the Peruvian snake Tachymenoides harrisonfordi in honor of actor Harrison Ford.

== Memberships ==
Lehr is a member of the following organizations: American Society of Ichthyologists and Herpetologists (ASIH), Association of Zoos & Aquariums (AZA), Česká společnost pro teraristiku a herpetologii v Praze (Czech Society for Terraristics and Herpetology, Prague), IUCN/SSC Amphibian Specialist Group, IUCN/SSC Tortoise and Freshwater Turtle Specialist Group, BIOPAT, German Zoological Society, German Society for Herpetology and Herpetoculture, Herpetologists’ League (HL), Societas Europaea Herpetologica (SEH), Society for the Study of Amphibians and Reptiles (SSAR), and the Zoological Society for the Conservation of Species and Populations.

== Eponyms ==
In 2007, the Peruvian frog species Eleutherodactylus lehri was named in honor of Lehr.

== Selected works ==
In addition to more than 60 scientific papers published in journals such as Copeia and Zootaxa, Lehr has contributed to the following publications:

- Edgar Lehr: Amphibians and reptiles in Peru: The herpetofauna along the 10th parallel of Peru: species inventory, taxonomy, ecological notes, and biogeographical relationships. Dissertation, Natur- und Tier-Verlag, Naturwissenschaft, Münster, 2002
- L. R. Burke, L. S. Ford, E. Lehr, S. Mockford, P. C. H. Pritchard, J. P. O. Rosado, D. M. Senneke, B. L. Stuart: Non-Standard Sources in a Standardized World: Responsible Practice and Ethics of Acquiring Turtle Specimens for Scientific Use. Chelonian Research Monograph 4, pp. 142–146, 2007
- Edgar Lehr: The Telmatobius and Batrachophrynus (Anura: Leptodactylidae) species of Peru. In: E. O. Lavilla & I. De La Riva (eds.): Studies on the Andean Frogs of the Genera Telmatobius and Batrachophrynus. Asociación Herpetológica Española, Monografías de Herpetología, 7, pp. 39–64, 2005
- William E. Duellman & Edgar Lehr: Terrestrial-Breeding Frogs (Strabomantidae) in Peru. Natur- und Tier-Verlag, 2009
