= Mufarech =

Mufarech is a surname. Notable people with the surname include:

- Jorge Mufarech Nemy (born 1944), Peruvian businessman and politician.
- Miguel Ángel Mufarech Nemy (born 1946), Peruvian accountant and politician
