= John All =

American geoscientist and climate researcher

John All is an American geoscientist and climate researcher whose work focuses on mountain environments, resource management, and the impacts of climate change on high-altitude communities. In 2014, he survived a 70-foot plunge through a Himalayan crevasse while conducting field-based research. He has held academic and research positions at universities in the United States, South America, and Asia, and has led scientific expeditions on five continents to examine climate change and use of resources.

== Background ==
Dr. All completed his undergraduate degree at Duke University. He received his Juris Doctor and a Master's Certificate in Environmental Ethics from the University of Georgia. He then pursued a PhD at the University of Arizona where he focused on Water Policy and Colorado River Law.

According to his personal biography, All worked as a program officer for a Climate Change and Human Health Initiative of the United Nations for six years. He has taught at Rutgers University, the University of Arizona, Tribhuvan University in Nepal, and Western Kentucky University. Following his accident on Mt Himlung, he has taught at the Universidad Nacional Agraria La Molina in Peru, and then Western Washington University, where he founded and led the Mountain Environments Research Institute in 2017.

He was a member of the IUCN Mountain Specialist Protected Areas Network and sat on the Geology and Geography Committee for the American Association for the Advancement of Science for many years. He is the co-founder and executive director of the American Climber Science Program (ACSP), a program that "brings together scientists, conservationists, students, and climbers to conduct research and engage in conservation activities in remote and mountain environments of the world."

Just before the founding of the American Climber Science Program, he had been in Nepal, teaching graduated Nepalese students how to collect valuable data and information from the mountains.

== Nepal 2014 ==
In the Spring of 2014, All led a team through the ACSP on an expedition to Mt Everest and Lhotse to collect environmental data to compare with their research in Cordillera Blanca in Peru. Supported by the National Science Foundation, American Alpine Club, and the US Fulbright Program, they collected snow and ice samples to determine glacial melt rates and regional air pollution.

On April 18, 2014, All's team was one of the groups hit with an avalanche in the Khumbu Icefall. 16 Nepali climbers were killed, and one of the climbers on the team was lost. After this tragedy, the team extended their expedition to Mt. Himlung near Annapurna to continue collecting data.

On May 19, 2014, All's team had dwindled down to three people, one of whom was reportedly not feeling well. His two companions journeyed down to base camp, leaving him alone to retrieve samples at Camp 2, which was roughly 6000m high. Although the site had been thoroughly scouted and deemed safe, All plunged through a 70-foot crevasse at roughly 10:00 AM while collecting samples.

All landed on a small ice shelf that stopped him from plummeting to the bottom of the crevasse. He describes the fall as "Vertigo. Blackness. So Fast. Impossibly Fast." After his fall, he spent several hours trying to get himself out moving only a few inches with every climb. All while this was happening, he documented this on his Sony Cyber-shot HX7 camera which he later uploaded to YouTube and became viral for.

== Mountain Environments Research Institute (MERI) ==
In 2017, John All founded the Mountain Environments Research Institute (MERI) at Western Washington University where he served as the founding director. MERI was created to integrate field-based scientific research, education, and conservation efforts for sensitive regions. It aims to develop a community of researchers that are trained to experience on-site research and pass their knowledge down through generations. MERI's faculty represent a wide range of disciplines. Early programming included coursework and field projects that focused on research in alpine regions across Washington and the Andes in Peru.

All emphasized the importance of mountain environments as indicators of climate change, noting that fragile mountainous ecosystems are among the first to show warming impacts. Under his leadership, MERI expanded field research initiatives and brought Western students into mountain research settings around the world. Prior to its shut down during COVID, All also represented MERI at academic forums, including speaking engagements on integrated mountain environment research.
