= Lily O. Rodríguez =

Peruvian herpetologist

- Other name: Lily Rodríguez Bayona
- Education: National Agrarian University; Paris Diderot University
- Occupation: Herpetologist
- Known for: Work in Cocha Cashu, Manu National Park

Lily O. Rodríguez is a Peruvian zoologist (herpetologist), ecologist and an expert in biodiversity conservation with extensive experience in international cooperation. In 2017, she was the Chair of Resources and Environmental Economics at the University of Bonn, Germany.

== Life and work ==
Rodríguez studied biology with a major in zoology at the National Agrarian University, in Lima, Peru. She obtained a BS in biology in 1982 with a study on an Amazonian tortoise. In 1984, she obtained a DEA in Ecology, from the University of Paris working in the Ecology Lab. In 1991, she earned a PhD in ecology, from the University of Paris VII, now known as Paris Diderot University, with her dissertation on the "reproduction and diversity of the frog community of Cocha Cashu, Manú National Park, Peru."

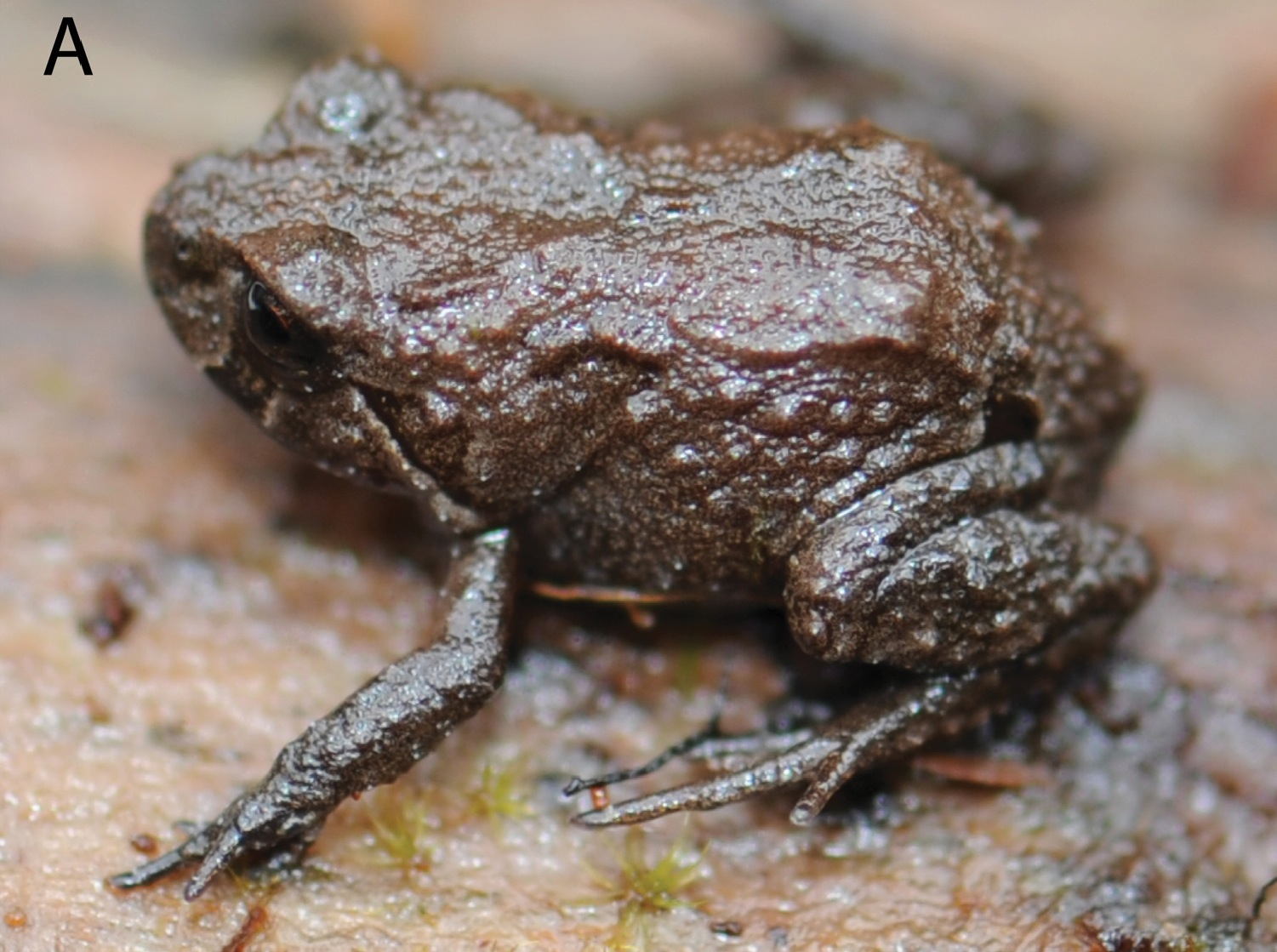
Phrynopus is a genus of frogs of the family Strabomantidae.

According to Researchgate, Rodríguez "does research on biodiversity conservation and public policy, protected areas, sustainability, among other interests such as tropical forests, forest restoration and herpetology."

In 2002, she co-founded CIMA in Cordillera Azul National Park and serves as the director of Institutional Development and is a member of its Board of Directors. In that capacity she goes by the name Lily Rodríguez Bayona and has published research using that name. She is an editor of the journal Biodiversity and Conservation.

As of 2017, she has authored four taxons – four new species of terrestrial-breeding frogs belonging to the genus Phrynopus from specimens collected on the eastern slopes of the Cordillera Oriental in northeastern Peru.

- Phrynopus anancites
- Phrynopus capitalis
- Phrynopus dumicola
- Phrynopus personatus

== Abbreviation ==
The abbreviation L.O.Rodríguez is used to indicate Lily O. Rodríguez as the authority on description and taxonomy in zoology.

== Selected awards ==
In 2003, Rodríguez won several awards:

- The Parker-Gentry Award (by the Field Museum of Natural History in Chicago)
- The National Award from the National Environmental Council for her accomplishments on biodiversity
- The Biodiversity Leadership Award from the Bay and Paul Foundations, for promoting the establishment one of the biggest national parks in Peru

== Selected publications ==
- Rodríguez, Lily O., and William E. Duellman. Guide to the frogs of the Iquitos region, Amazonian Peru. Natural History Museum, University of Kansas, 1994.
- Rodríguez, Lily O., and Kenneth R. Young. "Biological diversity of Peru: determining priority areas for conservation." AMBIO: A Journal of the Human Environment 29, no. 6 (2000): 329-337.
- Grant, Taran, and Lily O. Rodríguez. "Two new species of frogs of the genus Colostethus (Dendrobatidae) from Peru and a redescription of C. trilineatus (Boulenger, 1883)." American Museum Novitates 2001, no. 3355 (2001): 1-24.
- Catenazzi, Alessandro, Edgar Lehr, Lily O. Rodriguez, and Vance T. Vredenburg. "Batrachochytrium dendrobatidis and the collapse of anuran species richness and abundance in the upper Manu National Park, southeastern Peru." Conservation Biology 25, no. 2 (2011): 382-391.
- Delabre, Izabela, Lily O. Rodriguez, Joanna Miller Smallwood, Jörn PW Scharlemann, Joseph Alcamo, Alexander S. Antonarakis, Pedram Rowhani et al. "Actions on sustainable food production and consumption for the post-2020 global biodiversity framework." Science Advances 7, no. 12 (2021): eabc8259.
