= Cocha Cashu Biological Station =

Biological research station in Peru

Coordinates: 11°54′S 71°22′W

Cocha Cashu Biological Station (Estación Biológica Cocha Cashu or EBCC) is a tropical biological research station located at 11° 54'S and 71° 22'W in Manu National Park, Peru. It was established in 1969, predating the founding of its containing national park (est. 1973). Though only 10 km^{2} in area, the site has provided valuable research. The station is situated on the shore of an oxbow lake, from which it takes its name. "Qucha" (in hispanicized spelling cocha) is the Quechua word for lake. "Cashu" is derived from the English word "cashew" and refers to the shape of the lake.

== Environmental Makeup ==
The area is geographically diverse, consisting of grasslands bordering the Andes, gorges, and plains where climate is more variant and drier. The oxbow lake itself contributes areas of marsh and brushland. This is a nutrient-rich site, the soil consisting of silt and sand, and turnover along the riverbank occurs generally within 1000 years. The annual rainfall average is somewhat over 2000 mm, most of this falling from November to May. A marked dry season is from June to August. These factors combined lend to a relatively rapidly changing landscape.

Those areas which lie outside the path of the Rio Manu's meandering edges have vegetation much older than those closer to the river, but due to common treefall, the forest canopy is low. Much of the forest is only 25–30 meters tall, with a number of trees extending outside this range at 50 meters tall or more. An extensive network of lianas extends across the understory. Patches of bamboo, totaling almost a third of the locality, are marked by a scarcity of trees.

== Research ==
Along with La Selva Biological Station in Costa Rica and Barro Colorado Island (BCI) managed by the Smithsonian Tropical Research Institute (STRI) in Panama, Cocha Cashu is one of the best-studied ecological sites in the tropics. However, unlike La Selva or BCI, Cocha Cashu is in an area minimally impacted by humans, surrounded by millions of hectares of virgin forest, and thus provides critical insights into the organisms and processes found in a healthy, natural tropical rainforest. Over 500 articles, books, and other publications have resulted from field research conducted at Cocha Cashu. Studies related to those done at Cocha Cashu has been conducted at nearby Pakitza, on the same bank of Rio Manu, 21 km ESE. The two areas are very similar in makeup, reside at nearly the same elevation, and are not disconnected to impede species movement.

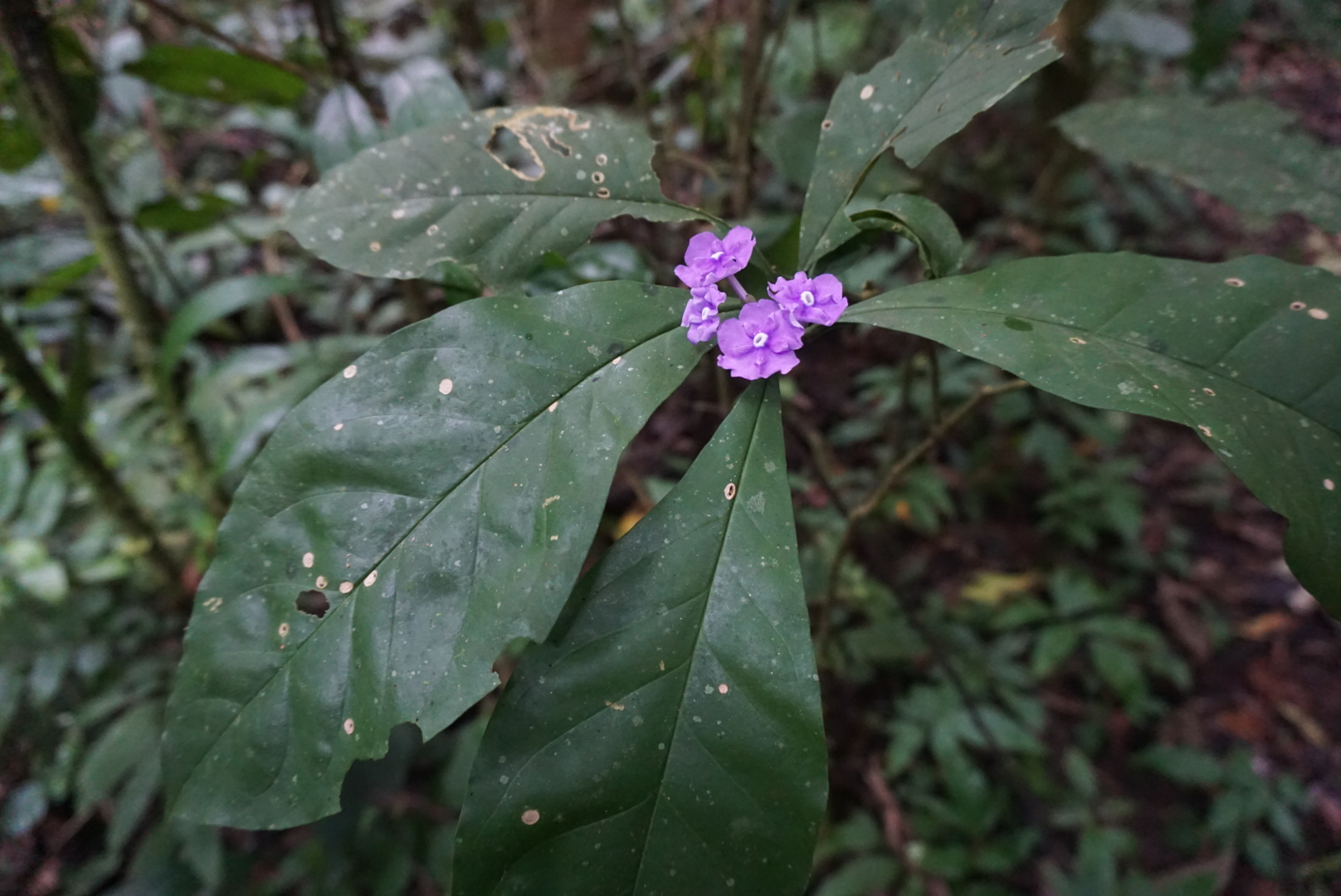
Cocha Brunfelsia

=== Flora ===
The Rio Manu area, in 1990, was found to consist of 1,856 species of vegetation, in comparison to the 2,874 species found in the entire national park. Much of the forest is dominated by trees and shrubs, rather than having a considerable population of epiphytes and terrestrial herbs. It is thought that this inequality may be due to either lack of intensive collection of these smaller flora, or due to scarce precipitation outside of the rainy season. Leguminosae (legumes) is the outstanding family of flora species makeup, with over 90 species. Moraceae, Rubiaceae, and Pteridophyta follow, with over 50 documented species each. Although no particular species of flora found at the Manu site was considered endemic to the area in 1990, it was suggested that the rate of forest loss might soon have created endemism. Annual production of seeds and fruit is high and well supports the site's animal communities. It has been considered that this may be in some significant part due to the prevalence of strangler figs, which make up a high proportion of the taller trees embedded within the canopy.

=== Fauna ===
==== Birds ====
While the uncovering of the bird community dynamics of this area of the Amazon lagged behind other Amazonian sections, Cocha Cashu is considered a center of avian endemism (as identified by Haffer in 1985). Mist-net sampling of the bird populations at the site began in 1973, and by 1990, data on 435 regularly occurring species had been collected. Insectivorous species dominate overall with 163 species, though many of these appear in the understory. Birds with a near-exclusive fruit diet numbered 58, occurring most often in canopies along with omnivores. Common species include hummingbirds, manakins, and trumpeters.

==== Herps ====
Initial studies at Cocha Cashu centered on the black caiman (Melanosuchus niger), and thus this is the only species of herpetofauna thoroughly studied (as of 1990). It is thought, however, that the makeup herp communities might be very similar in Manu to that of other areas along the western Amazon Basin. Even with only the limited studies done on herpetofauna here, there appears to be a high diversity of species.

In 2008, a study was conducted on amphibians at nine sites near Madre de Dios, one of these being Cocha Cashu. Results of this research found that 78 of the 114 species (68%) studied were found around the station, a nationally recognized protected area, while only 7.9% of the species observed were found outside of protected areas. These results stress the importance of national protection to the conservation of species diversity.

==== Mammals ====
Cocha Cashu's large mammal communities, due to being within a protected park, have not felt the effects of hunting which have damaged other Neotropical communities. This makes Manu a good place to study how tropical species communities may have looked and functioned before the influx of humans and technology. This is particularly relevant when studying jaguars, tapirs, ocelots, capybaras, giant otters, spider monkeys, woolly monkeys, and peccaries, as these populations have been highly hunted elsewhere. While fairly comprehensive lists of mammalian diversity at Cocha Cashu exist, most are over ten years old and may not be in line with current conditions. As of 1990, 70 nonflying mammal species had been recorded at the site, the majority of these being fruit-pulp eaters. Rodents were the most common category of mammals, with 24 species. Primates consisted of 13 species, carnivores of 12 species, and marsupials of 8 species. Together, these four groups made up over 80% of total identified species. Members of the family Felidae were found in surprising abundance, compared to other Neotropical sites.

The effect of tree gaps, an important factor in the study of tropical ecology, was studied at Cocha Cashu in reference to small mammals (rodents). No difference was found in the fruit feeding habits of either species studied between gap and understory areas, but were found to consume more fruit in the rainy season, when fruit was more abundant, than in the dry season.

Another paper based in the area proposes that these rodents are important assistants to the dispersal of mycorrhizal fungi, an important plant mutualist partner, in lowland Peruvian wet forest. The discussion of this study suggests the results may be applied generally to Neotropical areas.

=== Other Research ===
An intense storm event in 1994 in Cocha Cashu's locale prompted study of the effects of such storms on tropical forests. This particular event had been the most severe recorded within the 15 years prior. Wind knocked down 40 recorded trees, not counting those that had been felled by nearby treefall. These tended to be individuals that were emergent over the canopy, and the presence of root buttresses did not appear to affect whether the individual was susceptible to toppling due to these gusts.

== History ==
Cocha Cashu Biological Station was built in 1969, four years before the establishment of Manú National Park in 1973. Faculty members and students from La Molina National Agrarian University participated in its construction, with funding from the Frankfurt Zoological Society. Early research at the station included studies of the black caiman.

For more than thirty years, the station was managed by John Terborgh, an environmental science professor at Duke University, under the auspices of the Peruvian government. Research conducted at Cocha Cashu examined the ecology of primates, birds and jaguars, as well as forest composition.

In 2011, San Diego Zoo Global signed a ten-year memorandum of understanding with Peru's National Service of Natural Protected Areas (SERNANP) for the management of the station. In 2019, SERNANP confirmed that the station was administered through an interinstitutional cooperation agreement between the two organizations.

== Facilities ==
The station consists of rustic buildings with thatched roofs distributed across two forest clearings. Its facilities include the Casa Grande building, a combined kitchen and dining area, laundry areas, latrines and showers. A water tower and a double filtration system provide treated water from the lake.

The biological laboratory houses researchers' offices, a scientific library and storage areas. The station also has solar panels and a satellite dish. Visitors stay in tents pitched in designated areas of the forest understory. A network of more than 50 kilometres (31 mi) of trails provides access to the surrounding habitats.

== Access ==
One access route combines overland travel from Cusco to Atalaya with a boat journey to the station. The road journey to Atalaya takes approximately seven hours. From there, visitors travel by boat along the Alto Madre de Dios River to Boca Manu and, the following day, continue upstream along the Manú River to Cocha Cashu, approximately 80 kilometres (50 mi) from the river's mouth. According to the station's published travel information, the entire journey from Cusco takes approximately three days, depending on travel conditions.

== Dangers and Hazards ==
The many hazards of the Amazonian rainforest are well-publicized, including piranhas, anacondas, caimans, jaguars, pumas, peccaries, electric eels, stingrays, numerous poisonous snakes, insects, scorpions, spiders, plants, and other dangers. However, researchers at the station have interacted closely with the plants and animals of the rainforest for decades with very few negative encounters.

One notable exception occurred on April 27, 2000, when Francis J. Bossuyt disappeared while bathing in the lake at night. He has never been found, and presumed dead, perhaps killed by a caiman or anaconda. In the years since, a memorial in his name was established at the station, and more researchers and other visitors have chosen to use buckets or pumped water to bathe instead. The station also implemented a no bathing at night rule to prevent future tragedies.
