= Regional Government of Lima =

Regional government in Peru

- Gobierno Regional de Lima

Regional Government overview
- Formed: November 19, 2002; 22 years ago
- Jurisdiction: Department of Lima
- Headquarters: Huacho
- Regional governor responsible: Rosa Vásquez Cuadrado
- Website: Government site

The Regional Government of Lima (Spanish: Gobierno Regional de Lima; GORE Lima) is the regional government that represents the Department of Lima. It is the body with legal identity in public law and its own assets, which is in charge of the administration of nine provinces of the department (with the exception of the province of Lima, which is administered by the Metropolitan Municipality of Lima), on the central coast of Peru. Its purpose is the social, cultural and economic development of its constituency. It is based in the city of Huacho.

It is made up of the Regional Governor and the Regional Council.

== List of representatives ==
No.	Governor	Political party	Period
1	Miguel Ángel Mufarech Nemy	APRA	January 1, 2003–December 31, 2006
2	Nelson Oswaldo Chui Mejía	Concertación para el Desarrollo Regional - Lima	January 1, 2007–December 31, 2010
3	Javier Alvarado Gonzáles del Valle	Patria Joven	January 1, 2011–December 31, 2014
4	Nelson Oswaldo Chui Mejía	Concertación para el Desarrollo Regional - Lima	January 1, 2015–December 31, 2018
5	Ricardo Chavarría Oría	Fuerza Regional	January 1, 2019–December 31, 2022
6	Rosa Gloria Vásquez Cuadrado	Movimiento Regional Unidad Cívica Lima	January 1, 2023–Incumbent

== See also ==
- Metropolitan Municipality of Lima
- Regional Governments of Peru
- Department of Lima
