= Victor E. Cabrera =

American agricultural researcher

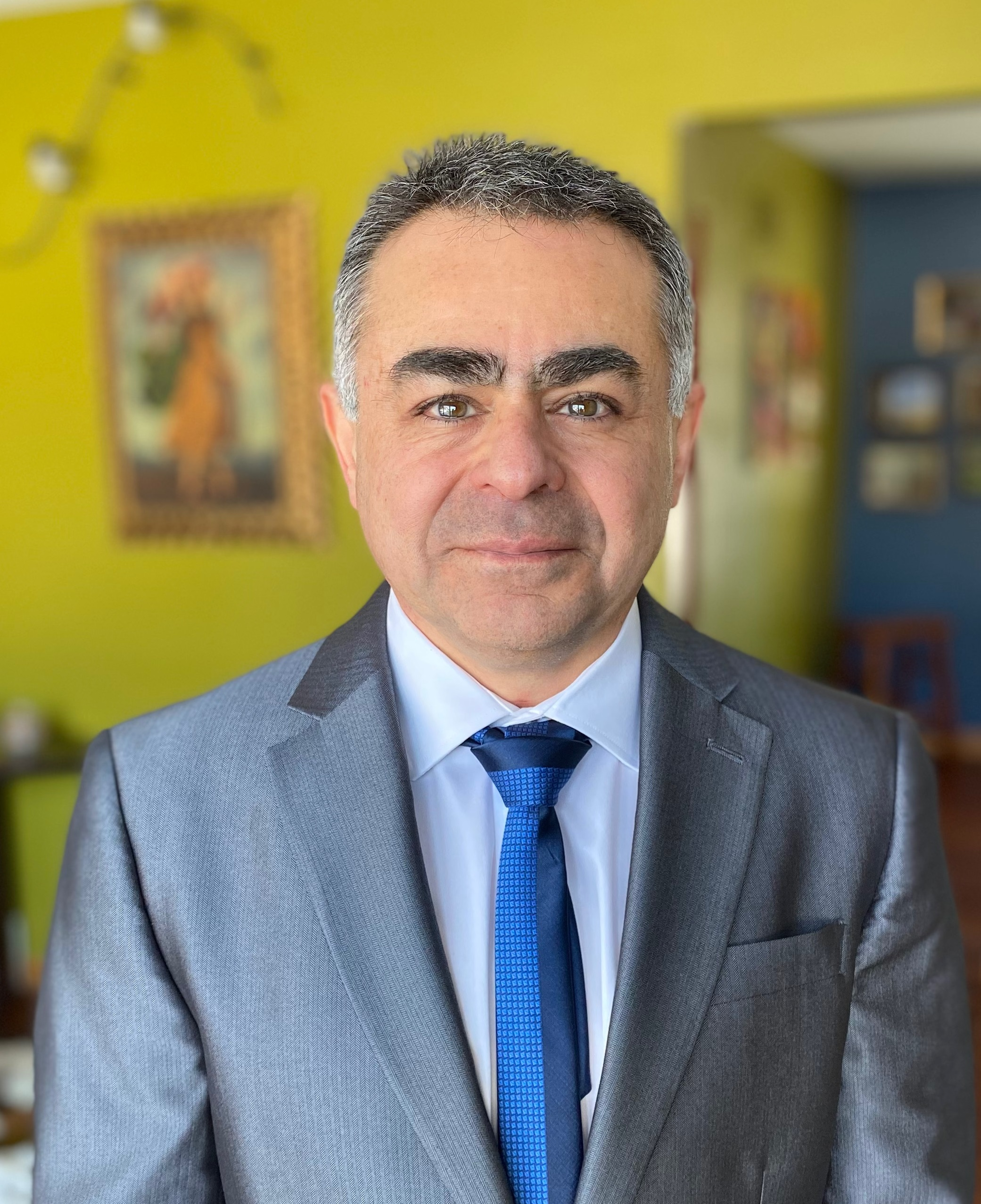
- Victor E. Cabrera, February 2021.
- Born: Cusco, Peru
- Occupations: Academic and researcher
- Awards: Second Mile Award, Wisconsin Association of County Agricultural Agents; DeLaval Dairy Extension Award, American Dairy Science Association

Academic background
- Education: B.S., Biology; M.S., Farming Systems Research and Extension; Ph.D., Interdisciplinary Ecology
- Alma mater: Universidad Nacional Agraria La Molina; University of Florida

Academic work
- Institutions: University of Wisconsin-Madison

Victor E. Cabrera is an American academic and researcher. He is a Professor and Extension Specialist in dairy farm management and Alfred Toepfer Faculty Fellow at University of Wisconsin-Madison's Department of Animal and Dairy Sciences.

Cabrera has developed more than 50 decision support tools for the farming industry. Cabrera is an experienced keynote speaker frequently invited to give talks in international research and extension conferences. He was listed as one of the College experts with the greatest reach through media in 2020 by University of Wisconsin.

Cabrera was listed among the World's Top 2% Scientists by Stanford University and Elsevier in 2020, 2021, and 2024. He is a Section Editor of the Journal of Dairy Science, Associate Editor of Frontiers in Animal Science - Precision Livestock Farming. He is the recipient of several awards including Pound Extension Award from University of Wisconsin–Madison College of Agricultural and Life Sciences, and Foundation Scholar Award in Dairy Production by the American Dairy Science Association.

Cabrera has published 283 research items and has 5,110 citations with an i10-index of 92 according to Google Scholar.

== Education ==
Cabrera studied Biology and Agronomy and graduated from Universidad Nacional Agraria La Molina in 1993. He then enrolled at University of Florida and earned his master's degree in Farming Systems Research and Extension in 1999, and his Doctoral degree in Interdisciplinary Ecology in 2004. He completed his postdoctoral research from University of Miami in 2006.

== Career ==
Cabrera joined New Mexico State University as an Assistant Professor before joining University of Wisconsin-Madison in 2008 as an assistant professor of dairy farm management. He was promoted to associate professor in 2013 and became a full professor in 2018.

== Research ==
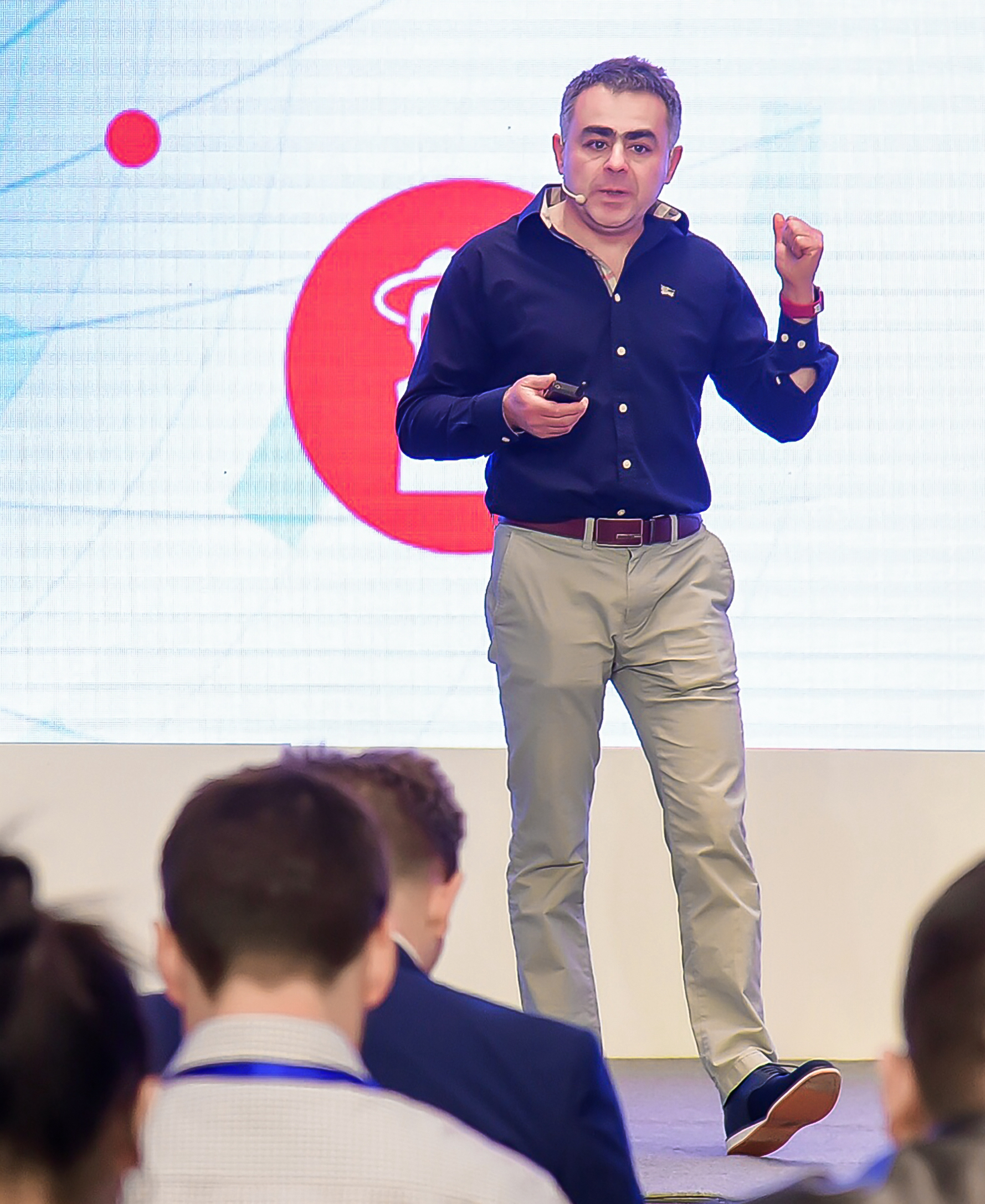
Cabrera gives keynote lecture in Zhou Zhuang, China, April 2019.

Cabrera has worked on combining applied research, interdisciplinary approaches, and participatory methods for the development of support tools that are aimed to improve farm profitability, environmental stewardship, and long-term sustainability of the farm industry.

=== Agricultural climate ===
Cabrera focused on the influence of seasonal climate variability and worked on AgClimate, a web-based climate forecast and information system for proactive adaptations to seasonal climate variability forecasts in the USA. He published a paper in the mid 2000 highlighting the system's main components and tools, along with the development of the various upgrades.

Cabrera also investigated the value of ENSO-based climate information and the impact of farm programs in situations involving varying climate, prices, and risk aversion levels. He found seasonal climate forecasts to be of higher value to risk averse farmers. His study also indicated a decrease in the value of forecast information when the commodity loan and crop insurance programs were included in the research. A follow up study proposed optimized crop insurance strategies to reduce farm risk using climate information.

=== Dairy farm management ===
Cabrera applied a technical inefficiency model and conducted an empirical analysis to study the determinants of technical efficiency among dairy farms in Wisconsin. He observed increased milk production due to an administration of bovine somatotropin hormone to lactating cows, and also highlighted the influence of farm efficiency on various factors. He presented an economic decision-making support system in the 2010s for predicting the future reproductive and economic performance of dairy herds. He also presented a case study regarding using the proposed model for comparing different reproductive management strategies. Cabrera developed a model that finds optimal strategies for guaranteeing target net returns when enrolling in a dairy farm price insurance program. He later applied the model to investigate the interplay between producer risk preferences, contract design, and premium subsidizing to determine program coverage.

Cabrera assessed the impact of mitigation strategies on greenhouse gas (GHG) emissions and net return to management on 3 farm production systems of Wisconsin. He found that using the effective mitigation strategies reduced GHG emissions and that the outcomes of feeding and manure management mitigation strategies was dependent on the type of farm system. He studied and reported the optimal feeding strategies on certified organic dairy farms. He developed a model to assess the economic value of using earlier chemical pregnancy tests and found that one-week earlier blood chemical tests can be economically effective if they are at least 90% accurate He also developed an economic model for studying the economic impact of twinning in dairy cows and for evaluation of management strategies to mitigate the aforementioned economic effect.

Cabrera also focused on nutrition and nutritional grouping and discussed the relevant constraints by presenting a survey study conducted in Wisconsin and Michigan dairy farms. He also identified the limiting factors regarding the grouping in farms having more than 200 lactating cows. He also highlighted the economic impact of nutritional grouping in dairy herds by applying a stochastic Monte Carlo simulation model. Cabrera developed a new nutritional grouping method, called the OptiGroup, which maximizes the milk income by using a mixed-integer nonlinear programming optimization algorithm. His study indicated OptiGroup to be more economical as compared to the cluster method for nutritional grouping. He also developed a model application for the systematization of nutritional grouping management in commercial dairy farms.

=== Dairy management tools ===
Cabrera has conducted research regarding the development of decision support tools. In 2005, he published a paper on the model components and computer implementation of the Dynamic North Florida Dairy farm model (DyNoFlo Dairy), which is a decision support system integrating nutrient budgeting, crop, optimization models, and the economic impacts resulting from reducing the nitrogen leaching in different climatic conditions He developed a decision support tool based on Markov chain model for solving the cow value and the replacement problem, along with future production expectancy of the cow and the genetic gain associated with the replacement. Also, Cabrera proposed a novel modeling framework using Markovian linear programming to optimize dairy farmer-defined goals and illustrate it with a practical application selecting optimal diets throughout entire lactations reaching maximum net income and minimum nitrogen excretion.

Cabrera designed a tool called the Wisconsin-Cornell Dairy Repro implementing the Markov-chain model to study the reproductive and economic impact of reproductive programs combining timed artificial insemination and different levels of artificial insemination after estrus detection.

=== Data science and precision dairy farming ===
Cabrera leads the UW-Madison Dairy Brain initiative, a technology to collect live dairy farm data streams from disaggregated sources in real-time.

== Awards and honors ==
- 2011 - Foundation Scholar Award in Dairy Production, American Dairy Science Association
- 2011 - Alfred Toepfer Faculty Fellow Award, University of Wisconsin-Madison College of Agricultural and Life Sciences
- 2012 - Pound Extension Award, University of Wisconsin-Madison College of Agricultural and Life Sciences
- 2012 - Distinguished Achievement Award, University of Florida School of Natural Resources and Environment
- 2013 - Second Mile Award, Wisconsin Association of County Agricultural Agents
- 2016 - Vilas Faculty Mid-Career Investigator Award, University of Wisconsin-Madison
- 2019 - DeLaval Dairy Extension Award, American Dairy Science Association
- 2023 - Excellence in International Activities Award, University of Wisconsin-Madison College of Agricultural and Life Sciences
- 2025 - Vilas Associate Award, University of Wisconsin-Madison

== Selected journal articles ==
- Cabrera, V. E., J. A. Barrientos, H. Delgado, and L. Fadul-Pacheco. 2020. Real-time continuous decision making using big data on dairy farms. Journal of Dairy Science 103:3856–3866.
- Cabrera, V. E., and A. S. Kalantari. 2016. Economics of production efficiency: Nutritional grouping. Journal of Dairy Science 99:825–841.
- Cabrera, V. E. 2014. Economics of fertility in high-yielding dairy cows on confined TMR systems. Animal 8:211-221.
- Cabrera, V. E. 2012. A simple formulation and solution to the replacement problem: A practical tool to assess the economic cow value, the value of a new pregnancy, and the cost of a pregnancy loss. Journal of Dairy Science 95:4683-4698
- Cabrera, V. E. 2010. A large Markovian linear program for replacement policies to optimize dairy herd net income for diets and nitrogen excretion. Journal of Dairy Science 93:394-406
