= Miguel Ángel Mufarech =

Peruvian politician (b. 1946)

Regional Councillor of Lima (Representing Huaura)
- In office January 1, 2015 – December 31, 2018

Regional President of Lima
- In office January 1, 2003 – December 31, 2006
- Succeeded by: Nelson Chui

Senator of the Republic of Peru (Representing unique district)
- In office July 27, 1985 – July 26, 1990

Senator of the Republic of Peru (Representing Lima)
- In office July 27, 1980 – July 26, 1985

Senator of the Republic of Peru (Representing unique district)
- In office July 28, 1978 – July 26, 1979

Personal details
- Born: January 11, 1946 Chiclayo, Peru
- Party: PPC (1966–1981); United Left (1985–1990); APRA (2002–2004)
- Relatives: Jorge Mufarech (brother)
- Education: Pontifical Catholic University of Peru

Miguel Ángel Mufarech Nemy (Chiclayo, January 11, 1946) is a Peruvian accountant and politician. He was the first Regional President of Lima from 2002 to 2006, Regional Councilor of Lima (2015-2018), Constituent Congressman during 1992–1995, Senator (1985-1980), Deputy of the Republic (1980-1985) and Constituent Deputy since 1978 until 1980.

== Early life ==
He was born in Chiclayo, on January 11, 1946. Son of José Mufarech Yapur and Wadia Nemi Traad. He is the brother of former congressman Jorge Mufarech.

He completed his primary and secondary studies at the Colegio Maristas Champagnat in Lima. He studied accounting at the Pontifical Catholic University of Peru without completing his degree. He was president of the board of directors of the Consejo Industrial San Martín S.A. from 1970 to 2001.

== Political career ==
From 1966 to 1981 he belonged to the Christian People's Party (PPC). In 1978, he was elected as a Constituent Deputy for the PPC in the constituent elections of that year, with 4,826 votes, for the parliamentary period 1978–1980.

In the 1980 general elections, Mufarech was elected Deputy of the Republic for the PPC for the parliamentary period 1980–1985.

In the general elections of 1985, he was elected Senator for the United Left as a guest, with 51,433 votes, for the parliamentary period 1985–1990. Completing his work, Mufarech stayed away from politics for a while.

For the 1995 general elections, Mufarech returned to politics as a candidate for the Congress of the Republic for the PPC, however, he was not elected.

In the 1998 municipal elections, he unsuccessfully ran for Mayor of La Victoria for Vamos Vecino.

Between 2002 and 2004, he joined the American Popular Revolutionary Alliance (APRA), led by former president Alan García.

In the 2002 regional elections, Mufarech was elected Regional President of Lima by APRA, becoming the department's first regional president for the regional period 2003–2006. At the end of his term, he unsuccessfully ran for re-election in the 2006 and 2010 regional elections.

In the 2011 general elections, Mufarech again ran for the Congress of the Republic for Cambio Radical without obtaining representation.

In the 2014 regional elections, he was elected Regional Councilor of Lima by Concertación para el Desarrollo for the period 2015–2018.

In the 2018 municipal elections, he ran for Mayor of Huara for Fuerza Regional without success.

== See also ==
- Jorge Mufarech
