= Nelson Chui =

Peruvian engineer, agronomist and politician

Nelson Oswaldo Chui Mejía (born 20 September 1947 in Chimbote) is a Peruvian engineer, agronomist and politician. He is the former Governor of Lima, serving from 2015 to 2018.

== Biography ==
Nelson Chui was born in Chimbote on 20 September 1947. He received his primary studies at Sacred Heart College of Chimbote and secondary education in the G.U.E. San Pedro de Chimbote and Alfonso Ugarte Zarumilla. In 1965, he entered the Universidad Nacional Agraria La Molina, studying Agricultural Engineering.

He has worked in the Cooperativa Andahuasi, and was Manager of Agrícola Santa Mónica, Servicentro Huaura SA and Proagro EIRL. He has also been President of the Chamber of Commerce of Huaura Province for 30 June 1998 to 31 May 2003, Secretary General of the Chamber (31 May 2002 – 30 April 2006) and Vocal Committee to Support the National Police of Peru and President of ProHuaura.

Since 2007, he has been regional governor of Lima Department, he failed to attain reelection in 2010, but he reelected to this position on October 5, 2014, when Chui won about 100,000 votes.

== Personal life ==
He has two children from his first marriage, Nelson Christian Chui La Rosa and Mónica Susana Chui La Rosa and two from later relationships, Alexander Chui Salinas and Samantha Chui. Three of his children live in Peru, and Mónica lives in the United States.

== Political activity ==
He participated in the regional elections of 2002 as a candidate for the regional presidency of Lima for National Unity, coming in second place. In the 2006 regional elections, as a representative of the Concertación Movement for Regional Development of Lima, he won the election by only 6 votes with the opposition candidate. Said accounting took a month to complete. He ran for re-election unsuccessfully in the 2010 elections and won the 2014 regional elections again, leading the same political organization.
