= Jorge Mufarech =

Peruvian politician (b. 1944)

Jorge Yamil Mufarech

Congressman of the Republic of Peru (Representing Lima)
- In office July 27, 2001 – July 26, 2006

Minister of Labour and Employment Promotion
- In office January 5, 1999 – April 15, 1999
- President: Alberto Fujimori
- Preceded by: Jorge González Izquierdo
- Succeeded by: Pedro Flores Polo

Personal details
- Born: August 12, 1944 Chiclayo, Peru
- Party: Possible Peru
- Relatives: Miguel Ángel Mufarech (brother)
- Education: National University of Engineering

Jorge Yamil Mufarech Nemy (August 12, 1944) is a Peruvian businessman and politician. He was Congressman of the Republic from 2001 to 2006 and Minister of Labour during the second term of Alberto Fujimori's presidency (1999).

== Early life ==
Mufarech was born in Chiclayo, on August 12, 1944, to José Mufarech Yapur and Wadia Nemi Traad. He is the brother of former senator Miguel Ángel Mufarech. He completed his primary and secondary studies at the Champagnat School. He studied at the National University of Engineering. However, he did not complete his studies and dedicated himself to the textile industry.

He founded the Consorcio Industrial San Martín S.A. and the companies Tecnología Textil and POWELL S.A. He is a member of the National Society of Industries.

He was elected as a representative of Peru's private business sector for the Business Advisory Council of the Asia-Pacific Economic Cooperation (APEC) Forum.

He served as vice president of the Metropolitan Professional Football Association and of the Support Commission for the Peruvian Volleyball Federation.

== Political career ==
=== Minister of Labour (1999) ===
On January 5, 1999, Mufarech was appointed Minister of Labour by former president Alberto Fujimori in the second term of his presidency.

During his administration, he denounced acts of corruption in the National Customs Superintendency (SUNAT). Mufarech stated that there was a corruption network that facilitated smuggling and that the Peruvian State stopped receiving about US$ 10 billion in 10 years. The controversy unleashed brought with it the resignation of the entire cabinet chaired by Víctor Joy Way. In April 1999, with the fall of the cabinet, Mufarech left office. A few days later, he was accused by the SUNAT of alleged undervaluation in the importation of a vehicle into Peru.

In February 2000, the Somos Perú party announced Mufarech as a candidate for the Congress of the Republic. However, the government of Fujimori reactivated the criminal process and prevented Mufarech's candidacy for Congress due to a Law that prohibited people who have tax accusations against them from running for Parliament.

During the Four Quarters March led by Alejandro Toledo, Mufarech collaborated as an opponent of Fujimori.

=== Congressman (2001–2006) ===
After the ousting of Alberto Fujimori, general elections were called for 2001. In these elections, Mufarech presented himself as a candidate for Congress for Perú Possible where he was later elected Congressman, with 141,536 votes, for the parliamentary period of 2001–2006.

During his parliamentary work, he was President of the Industry, Commerce, Tourism and SMEs Commission (2001-2002), Vice President of the Consumer Defense Commissions (2004-2005), Supervision and Comptrollership (2005-2006) as well as a member of the Defense, Economy and Foreign Trade Commissions.

== See also ==
- Miguel Ángel Mufarech
