= National Agrarian University =

Public university in Lima, Peru

Coordinates: 12.082°S 76.948°W

National Agrarian University (UNALM)
- Universidad Nacional Agraria La Molina
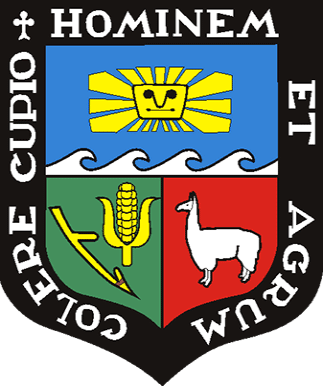
- Motto: Hominem et Agrum colere cupio
- Motto in English: I want to cultivate the Man and the Land
- Type: Public (National)
- Established: 22 July 1902
- Affiliations: Association of National Universities of Peru (AUNAP)
- Rector: PhD Enrique Ricardo Flores Mariazza
- Students: 6424 ^{[When?]}
- Undergraduates: 5176
- Postgraduates: 1248
- Location: Lima, Peru
- Campus: Suburban 550 acres (2.2 km^{2})
- Colors: Green
- Website: www.lamolina.edu.pe

The National Agrarian University, also formally called National Agrarian University – La Molina (Spanish: Universidad Nacional Agraria La Molina) (UNALM), is a public university in Lima, Peru. Of particular renown in the fields of agricultural, biological, and forestry sciences, it is also the only university in Peru offering degrees in meteorology. The university is organized into eight faculties which contain twelve academic departments. It is considered one of the most important higher education institutions of Peru.

== History ==
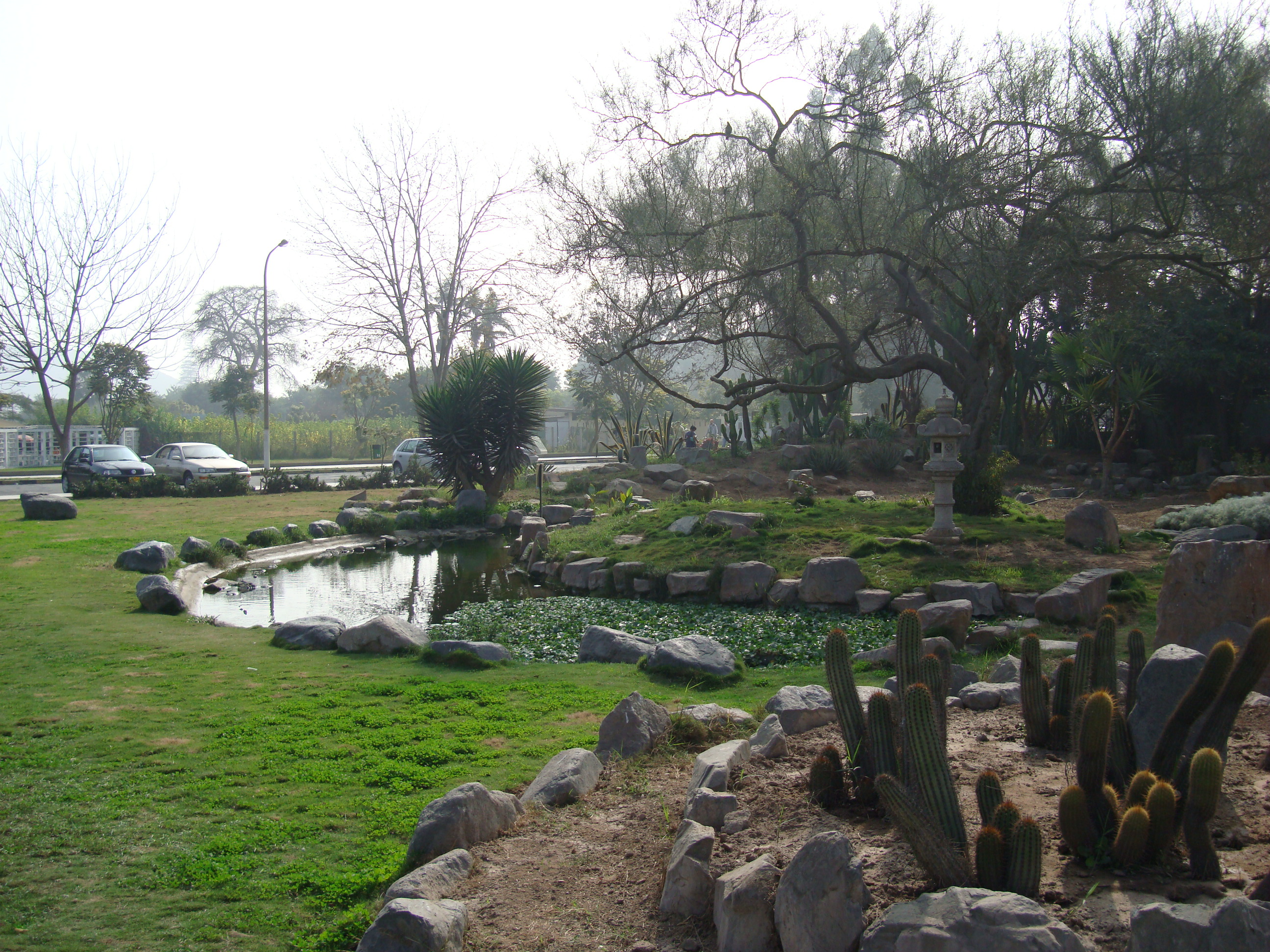
View of a small artificial lake inside the campus.

In 1901, during the government of President Eduardo López de Romaña, the creation of the National School of Agriculture and Veterinary Science was planned with the participation of a Belgian mission. The official inauguration of the school was on 22 July 1902. In 1912, the Central Agronomic Station was created with the purpose of developing the agricultural sector.

A campus in the Fundo Santa Beatriz (currently Jesús María) served as the school's first location. The university's current campus, in the Valley of Ate (currently La Molina District), was inaugurated in 1933. In 1960, the school was officially recognized as a university and was renamed to its current name: The National Agrarian University.

In 1961, the faculties of Agriculture, Animal Science, Agricultural Engineering and the Institute for Research and Advanced Studies began work as academic organizations. In the same year, the institution decreed the creation of the Faculty of Life and Physical Sciences and the Faculty of Economics and Social Sciences (both simultaneously started work in early 1962). The faculties of Forestry Science, of Fisheries Science and of Food Sciences and Technology began operating in 1963,1966 and 1969 respectively.

The National Agrarian University was governed by the University Act No. 23733, promulgated on 9 December 1983, which maintains the academic departments, restored the faculty system and frees each university to organize and establish its own academic system, according to their characteristics and needs. According to the current University Act, the governance of universities and the faculties are exercised by University Assembly, University Council, Rector and Faculty Council and Dean. In 2014, the new University Act No. 30220 was enacted.

In 2017, due to the new university licensing process by the National Superintendence of Higher University Education (SUNEDU), after meeting the educational basic quality conditions, the National Agrarian University was licensed, also being the first Peruvian public university to be licensed.

== Faculties and programs ==
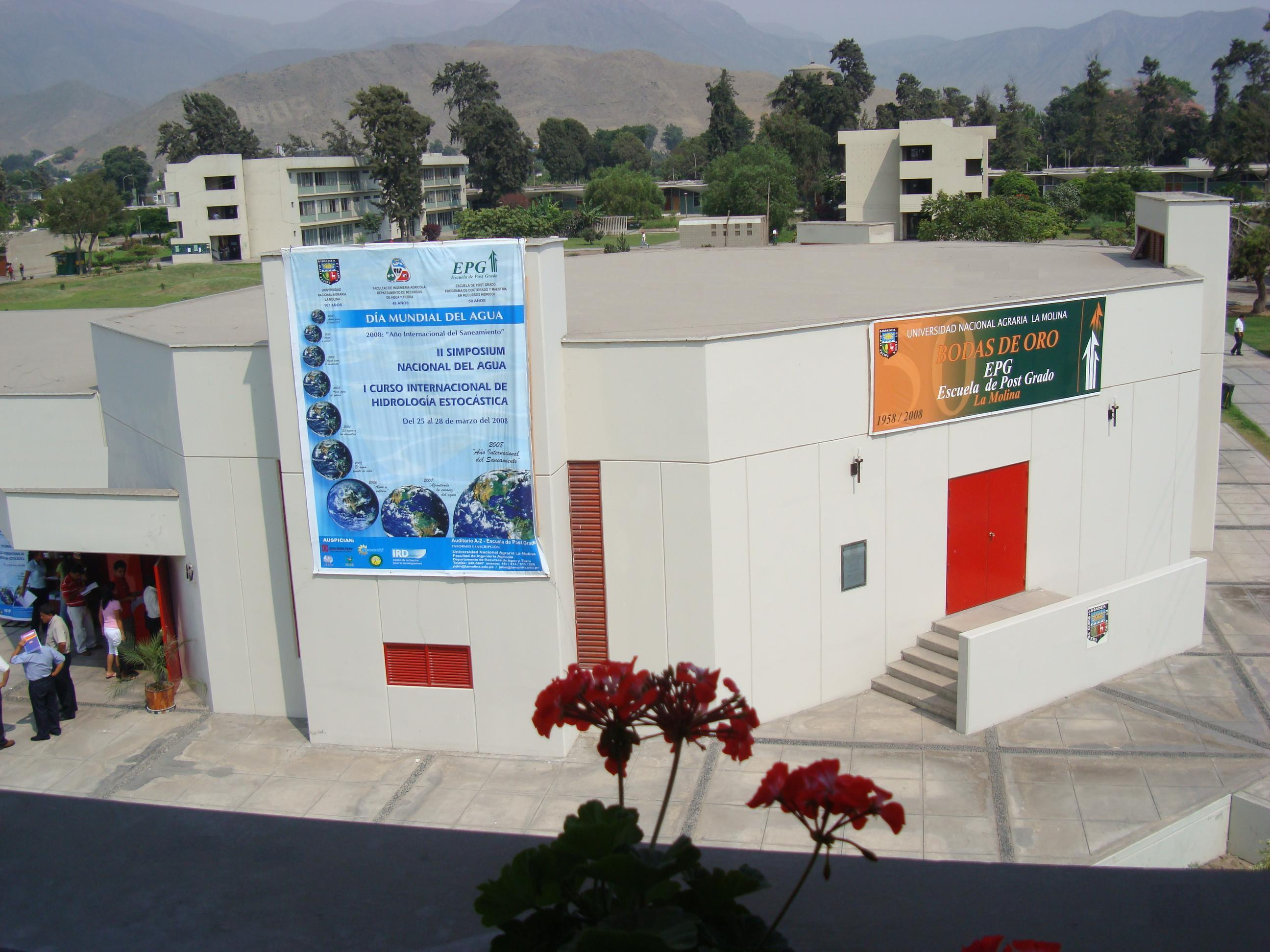
Auditorium of the graduate school

The university is organized into eight faculties and twelve academics departments. Each department offers an undergraduate program. The graduate school has 33 academics programs.

Undergraduate
Faculty of Agronomy	Agronomy
Faculty of Life and Physical Science	Biology; Environmental Engineering; Meteorology
Faculty of Forestry Science	Forestry Engineering
Faculty of Economics and Planning	Business Management; Economics; Statistics and Informatics
Faculty of Food Science and Technology	Food Engineering
Faculty of Agricultural Engineering	Agricultural Engineering
Faculty of Fisheries Science	Fisheries science
Faculty of Animal Science	Zootechny
Masters
Economics	Administration; Agribusiness; Agricultural Economics; Applied Statistics; Economics of Natural Resources and Environment
Environment	Applied Ecology; Applied Meteorology; Ecotourism; Environmental Science; Forest Resources Conservation; Forest Resources Management; Integrated Watershed Management; Water Resources
Agricultural Sciences	Agricultural Innovation for Rural Development; Agricultural Production; Animal Production; Entomology; Integrated Pest Management; Phytopathology; Plant Breeding; Soils; Sustainable Agriculture
Nutrition and Food	Aquaculture; Food Technology; Nutrition; Public Nutrition
Doctorates
Animal Science; Biological Sciences and Engineering; Economics of Natural Resources and Sustainable Development; Environmental Engineering; Nutrition; Sustainable Agriculture; Water Resources

=== Admission ===
It offers income through the modalities of ordinary, internal and external transfer, for the disabled, for athletes and more. It is one of the only public universities that does not return the question sheet to the student after the entrance exam.

== Research ==
The National Agrarian University has always worked significantly in the scientific development of Peru throughout its history. In Peru, this university is one of the few that conduct research; only 10 universities in over 80 do. This is due primarily to the lack of funding research development by the Peruvian government in recent decades.

=== Research institutes ===
The university has the following research institutes:

- INDDA (Agro-Industrial Development Institute)
- IBT (Biotechnology Institute)
- IPPS (Institute for Sustainable Small Production)
- IRD Costa (Regional Development Institute – Costa)
- IRD Sierra (Regional Development Institute – Sierra)
- IRD Selva (Regional Development Institute – Selva)

=== National Agricultural Library (Biblioteca Ágricola Nacional) ===
- The National Agricultural Library (BAN) is the main information center in the area of Agricultural Sciences of the National Agrarian University. It is considered the leading Agricultural Library in Peru and since 2000, it has additionally developed the responsibility of National Coordinating Center of the "Documentation System of Latin America and the Caribbean" (SIDALC).

== Gallery ==
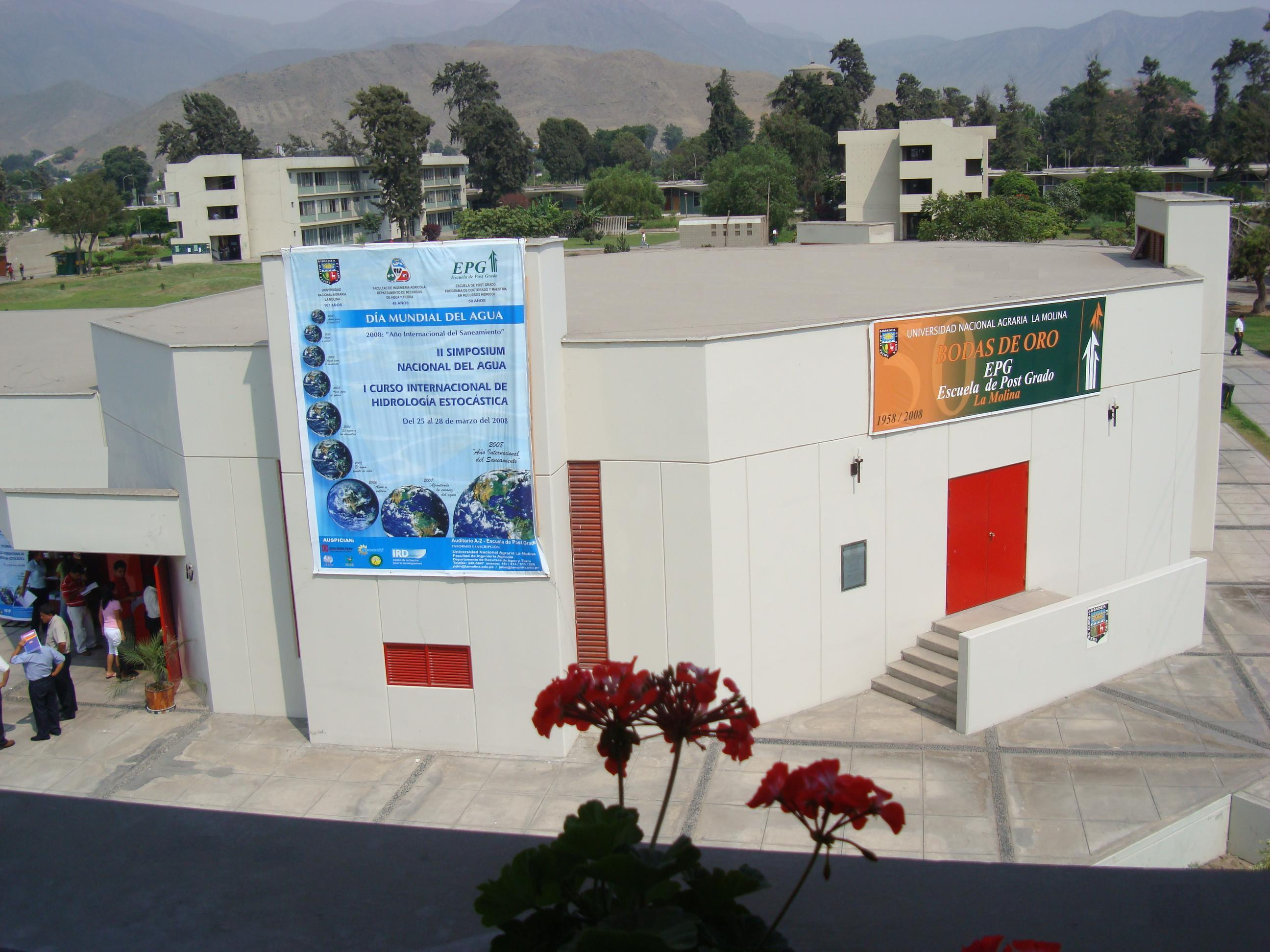
Auditorium of the graduate school.

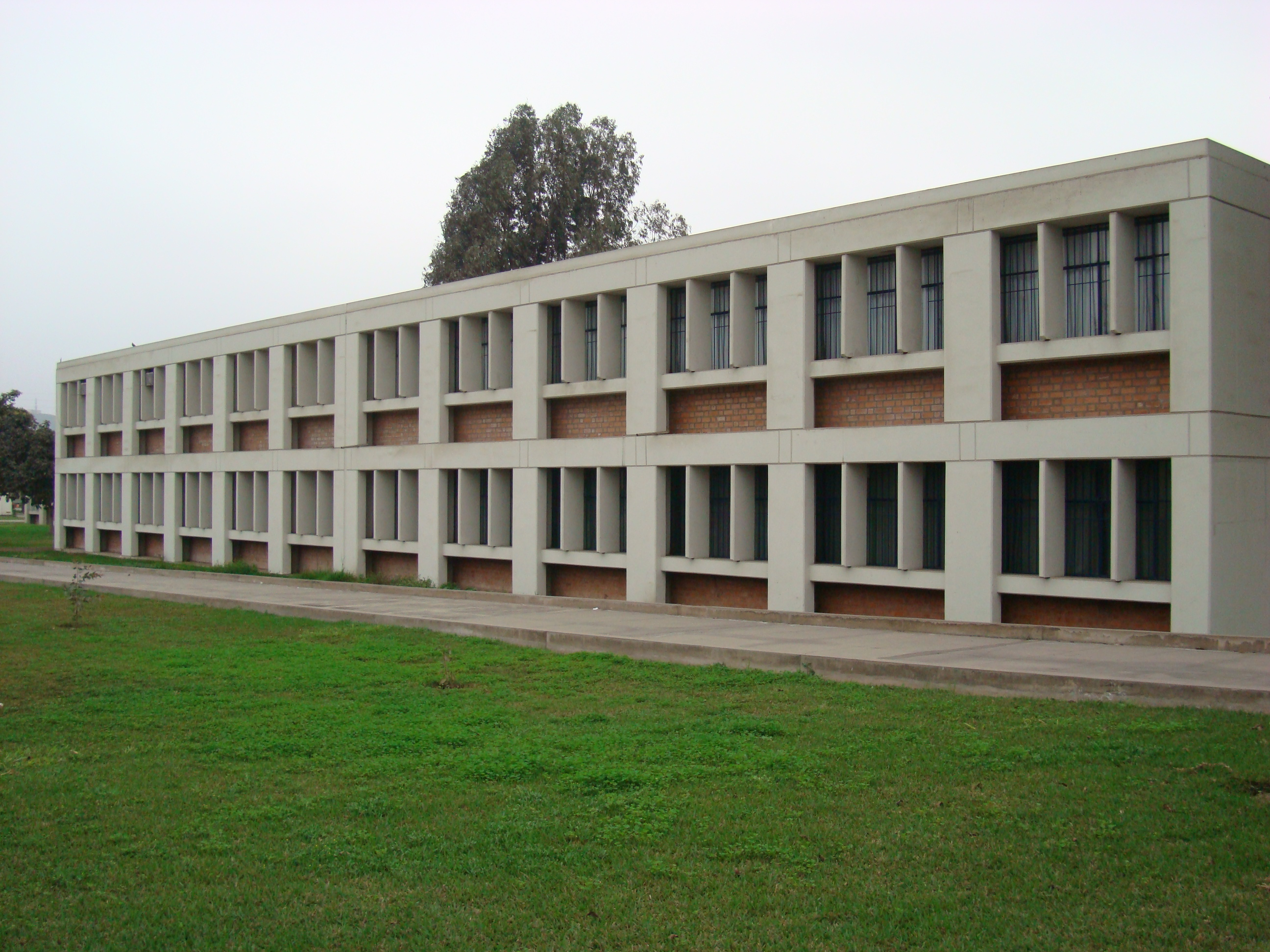
Classrooms (rear view).

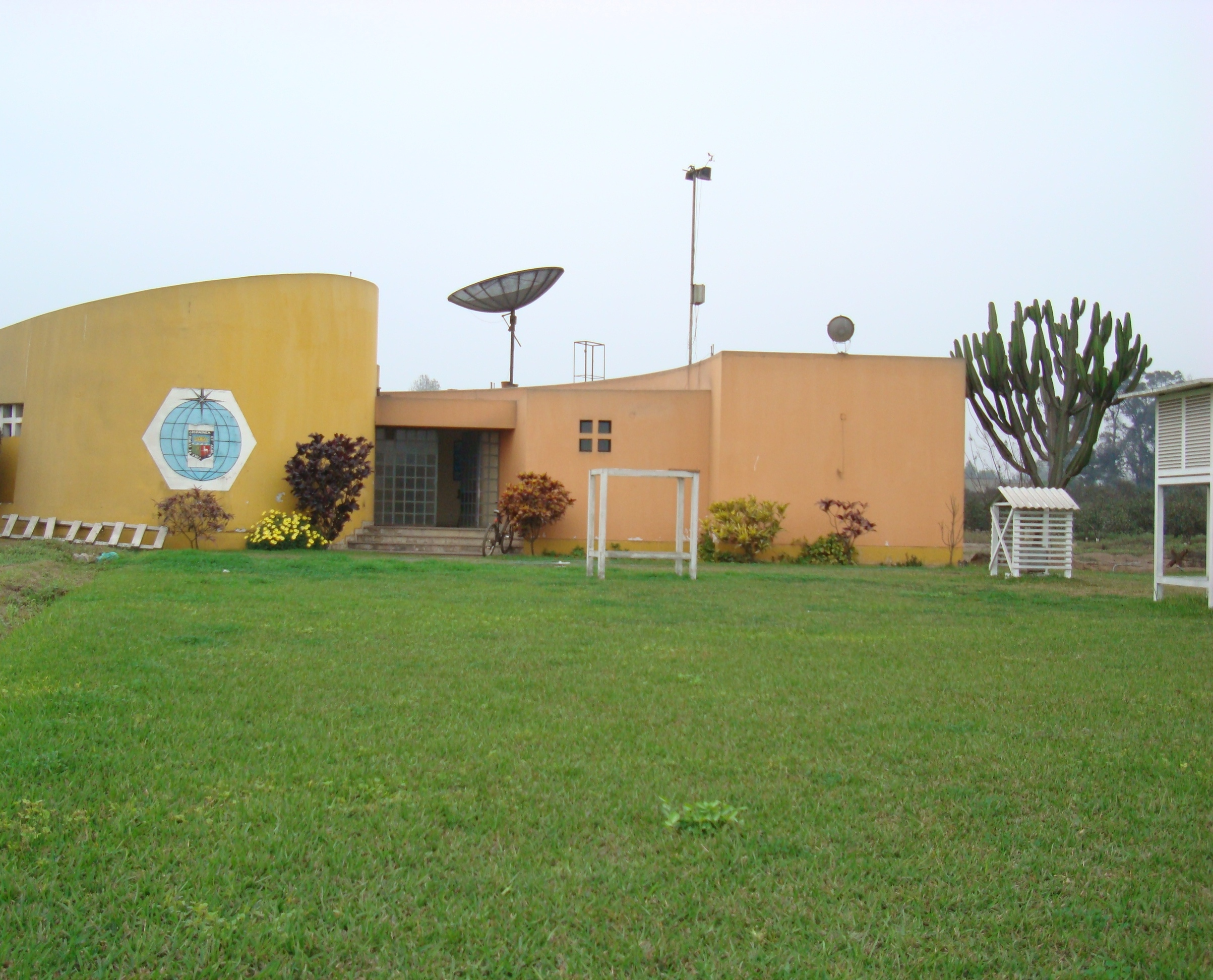
Meteorology Station.

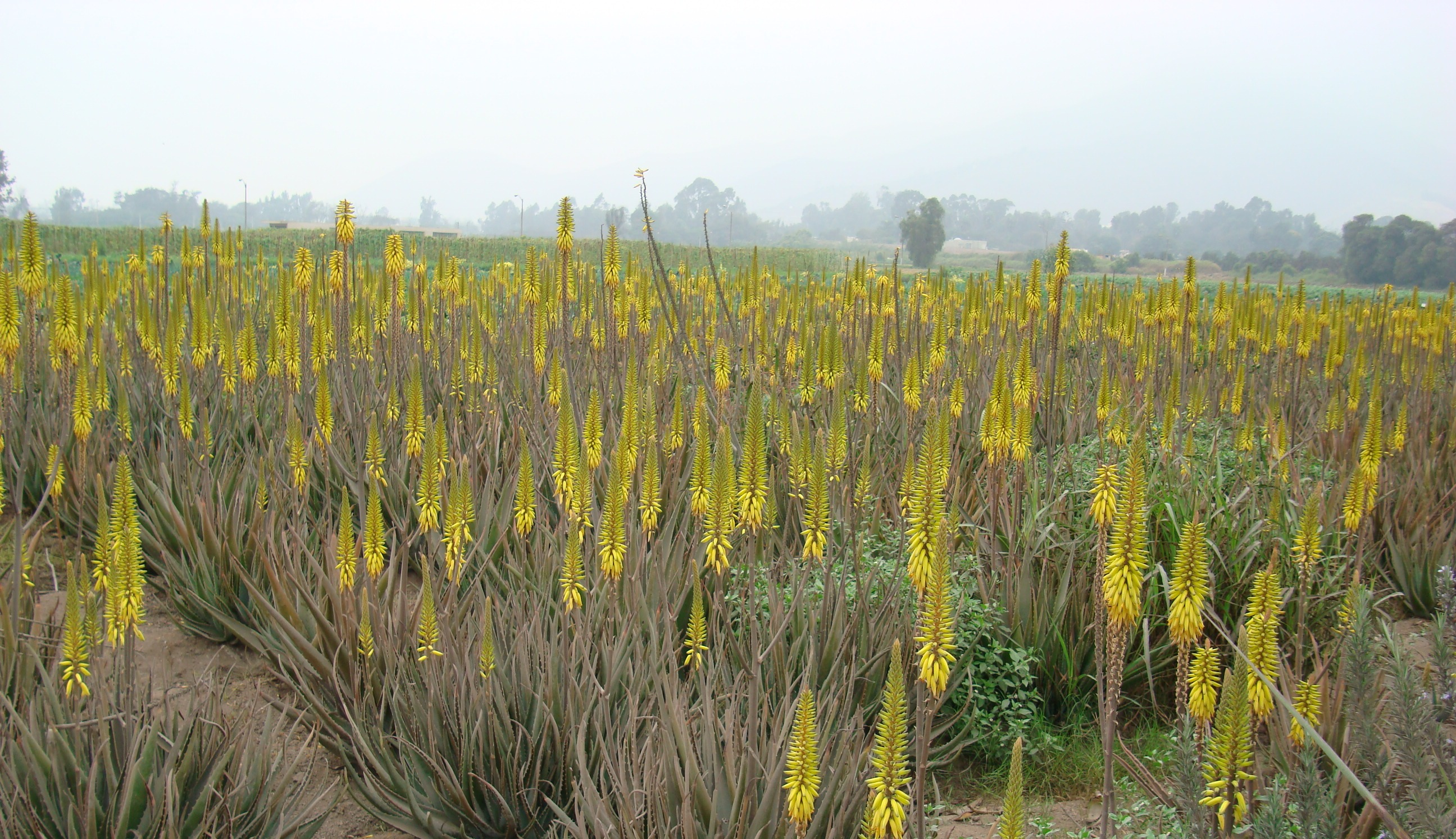
Crops of aloe vera.

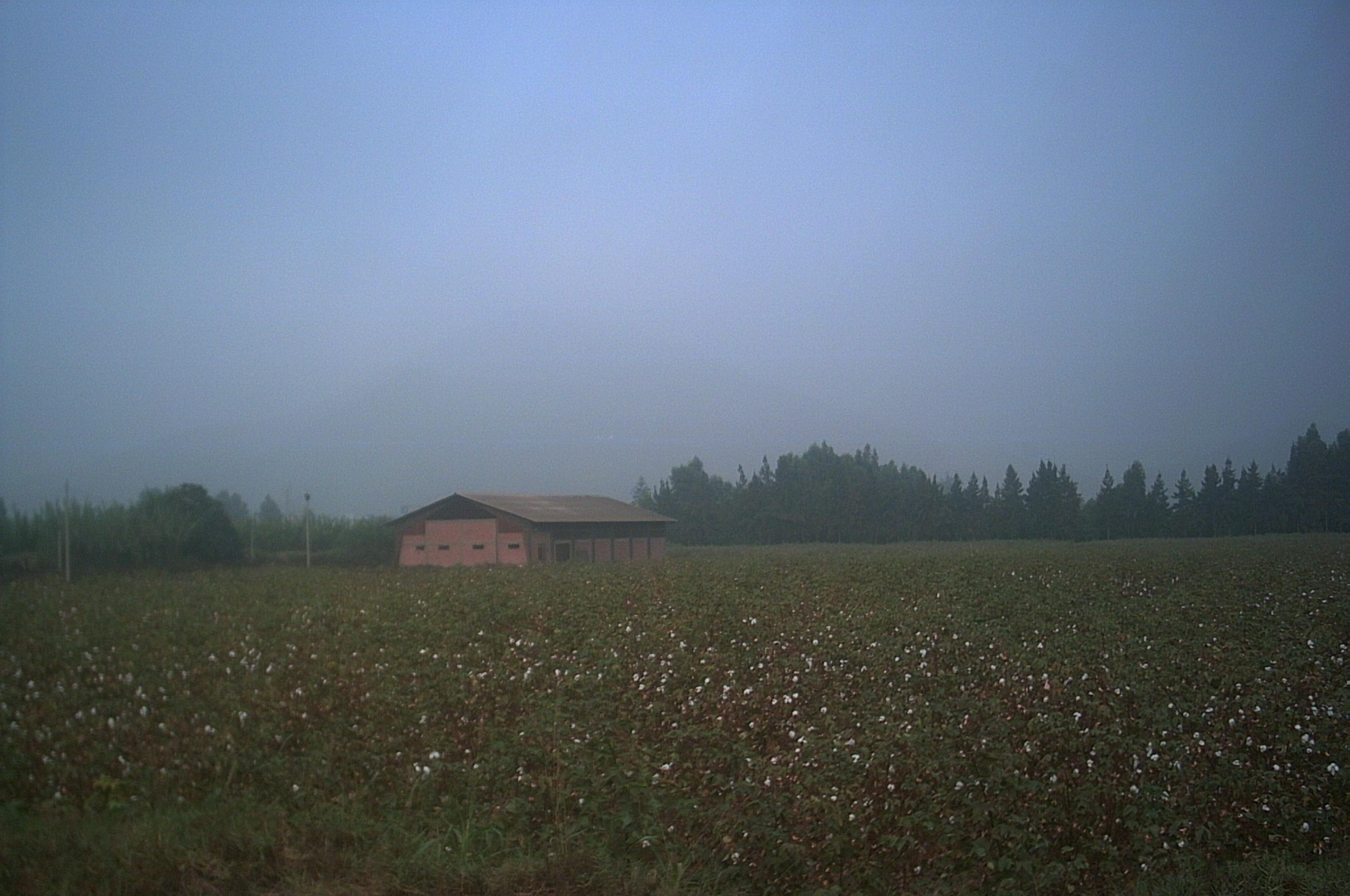
Crops of cotton.

== Community services ==
In addition to undergraduate and graduate specialties, UNALM offers consulting, short courses, refresher and retraining technical and professional specialization semester courses, refresher courses and technical laboratory in biology, gardening workshops, hydroponics, raising small animals (guinea pigs, quail, etc.), bakery, dairy, meats, etc. UNALM has a riding school, a language centre and offers agro products to the community through its sales center.

== Rankings ==
UNALM has regularly ranked within the top ten nationally in certain international university rankings.

In 2021, the QS World University Ranking of the british company Quacquarelli Symonds ranked the National Agrarian University as the 6th best university in the country and the 2nd best public university in Peru.

== Notable alumni ==
- Victor E. Cabrera, academic and researcher.
- Alberto Fujimori, politician.
- Juan Carlos Hurtado Miller, economist.
- Marc Dourojeanni, agronomist.
- Antonio Brack Egg, the first Peruvian Minister of the Environment.
- Ismael La Rosa, actor and student of zootechny (did not finish).
- Pedro Brescia, Peruvian businessman. He was the co-chairman of Grupo Breca.
- Nelson Oswaldo Chui Mejía, politician.
- Lily O. Rodríguez, zoologist (herpetologist), ecologist
- Absalón Vásquez, politician.

== See also ==
- List of universities in Peru
