= Atelopus moropukaqumir =

Scientific classification
- Kingdom: Animalia
- Phylum: Chordata
- Class: Amphibia
- Order: Anura
- Family: Bufonidae
- Genus: Atelopus
- Species: A. moropukaqumir

Binomial name
- Atelopus moropukaqumir Herrera-Alva, Díaz, Castillo, Rodolfo & Catenazzi, 2020

Species of amphibian

Atelopus moropukaqumir is a species of toad in the family Bufonidae. It is endemic to southern Peru, where it was discovered in a cloud forest near Anchihuay in the department of Ayacucho, marking the first known Atelopus record from that region. It closely resembles Atelopus erythropus in appearance but differs in ventral coloration, skin texture, and snout shape. The chytrid fungus Batrachochytrium dendrobatis, which has been implicated in the extinctions of other Atelopus species, was detected in some of the sampled individuals; however, the occurrence of the fungus was low, and did not seem to have any major impacts on the species; this could indicate that A. moropukaqumir has developed resistance to the disease.
