= Atelopus seminiferus =

Conservation status
- Endangered (IUCN 3.1)

Scientific classification
- Kingdom: Animalia
- Phylum: Chordata
- Class: Amphibia
- Order: Anura
- Family: Bufonidae
- Genus: Atelopus
- Species: A. seminiferus

Binomial name
- Atelopus seminiferus Cope, 1874

Species of amphibian

Atelopus seminiferus, the Upper Amazon Stubfoot Toad, is a species of toad in the family Bufonidae. It is endemic to Peru. Its natural habitats are subtropical or tropical moist montane forests and rivers.
