= Atelopus pictiventris =

Conservation status
- Critically Endangered (IUCN 3.1)

Scientific classification
- Kingdom: Animalia
- Phylum: Chordata
- Class: Amphibia
- Order: Anura
- Family: Bufonidae
- Genus: Atelopus
- Species: A. pictiventris

Binomial name
- Atelopus pictiventris Kattan, 1986

Species of amphibian

Atelopus pictiventris is a species of toad in the family Bufonidae. It is endemic to Colombia. Its natural habitats are subtropical or tropical moist montane forests, rivers, pastureland, and heavily degraded former forest.
