= Atelopus dimorphus =

Conservation status
- Data Deficient (IUCN 3.1)

Scientific classification
- Kingdom: Animalia
- Phylum: Chordata
- Class: Amphibia
- Order: Anura
- Family: Bufonidae
- Genus: Atelopus
- Species: A. dimorphus

Binomial name
- Atelopus dimorphus Lötters, 2003

Species of amphibian

Atelopus dimorphus is a species of toads in the family Bufonidae endemic to Peru. Its natural habitats are subtropical or tropical moist montane forests and rivers.
