= Atelopus nepiozomus =

Conservation status
- Endangered (IUCN 3.1)

Scientific classification
- Kingdom: Animalia
- Phylum: Chordata
- Class: Amphibia
- Order: Anura
- Family: Bufonidae
- Genus: Atelopus
- Species: A. nepiozomus

Binomial name
- Atelopus nepiozomus Peters, 1973

Species of amphibian

Atelopus nepiozomus, the Gualecenita Stubfoot Toad, is a species of toad in the family Bufonidae. It is endemic to Ecuador. Its natural habitats are subtropical or tropical high-altitude grassland and rivers. It is threatened by habitat loss.
