= Atelopus sernai =

Conservation status
- Critically endangered, possibly extinct (IUCN 3.1)

Scientific classification
- Kingdom: Animalia
- Phylum: Chordata
- Class: Amphibia
- Order: Anura
- Family: Bufonidae
- Genus: Atelopus
- Species: A. sernai

Binomial name
- Atelopus sernai Ruíz-Carranza & Osorno-Muñoz, 1994

Species of amphibian

Atelopus sernai, the Baldias Harlequin Toad, is a species of toad in the family Bufonidae. It is endemic to the northern Andes of Colombia. Its natural habitats include subtropical or tropical moist montane forests, subtropical or tropical high-altitude grassland, and rivers. It is threatened by habitat loss.

== Sources ==
- Rueda, J.V., Osorno-Muñoz, M., Ardila-Robayo, M.C., Maldonado-Silva, R.A., Bolívar, W., Castro, F. & Lynch, J. 2004. Atelopus sernai. 2006 IUCN Red List of Threatened Species. Downloaded on 21 July 2007.
