= Atelopus eusebiodiazi =

Conservation status
- Critically endangered, possibly extinct (IUCN 3.1)

Scientific classification
- Kingdom: Animalia
- Phylum: Chordata
- Class: Amphibia
- Order: Anura
- Family: Bufonidae
- Genus: Atelopus
- Species: A. eusebiodiazi

Binomial name
- Atelopus eusebiodiazi Venegas, Catenazzi, Siu-Ting and Carrillo, 2008
- Atelopus eusebiodiazi (Peru)
- Atelopus eusebiodiazi is only known from Huamba, in Piura Region, northwestern Peru

Species of amphibian

Atelopus eusebiodiazi is a species of toads in the family Bufonidae. It is endemic to north-western Peru and only known from its type locality in Huamba, near Ayabaca, Piura Region. The specific name eusebiodiazi honors Eusebio Diaz, taxidermist at the Museum of Natural History, Lima, and the collector of the holotype.

== Description ==
Atelopus eusebiodiazi is a relatively large Atelopus: adult males measure 36–41 mm (1.4–1.6 in) and females 43–47 mm (1.7–1.9 in) in snout–vent length. The head is longer than it is wide. There is no tympanum. The body is robust with relatively short limbs. The fingers are unwebbed whereas the toes have some webbing. Coloration of living specimens is unknown. In preservative, the dorsum is either chocolate brown with irregular black blotches and some yellowish cream blotches on flanks, or black with some irregular yellowish cream marks and a yellowish cream irregular dorso-lateral stripe. The venter is cream (sometimes with small black blotches), as are the palms and soles.

== Habitat and conservation ==
Atelopus eusebiodiazi lives in cloud forests at elevations of about 2,950 m (9,680 ft) above sea level. Specimens have been spotted in leaf litter and along small streams. Presumably, breeding takes place in fast-flowing streams.

As of 2018, the species had last been observed in 1997—surveys in 2001 and 2006 failed to find it. It is possible that it is extinct, as only patches of suitable habitat remain. The type locality is threatened by habitat loss caused by increasing cattle grazing and agricultural land use.
