= Atelopus gigas =

Conservation status
- Critically endangered, possibly extinct (IUCN 3.1)

Scientific classification
- Kingdom: Animalia
- Phylum: Chordata
- Class: Amphibia
- Order: Anura
- Family: Bufonidae
- Genus: Atelopus
- Species: A. gigas

Binomial name
- Atelopus gigas Coloma, Duellman, Almendáriz, Ron, Terán-Valdez & Guayasamin, 2010

Species of amphibian

Atelopus gigas, the Giant Stubfoot Toad, is a species of frog in the family Bufonidae. It was endemic to La Victoria, Departamento Nariño near the Andes Mountains of Colombia, Ecuador and Peru. It has not been seen since 1970 and is considered possibly extinct. Some of them kept them on the Critically endangered list but they still may be extinct. It has not officially been seen since 1970 and was declared extinct in 2004.

== Taxonomy ==
Atelopus gigas was described in 2010. The specific name gigas comes from the Greek word for giant. It was given for the species' large size.

== Description ==
Atelopus gigas is one of the largest species in its genus, with males ranging from 43 to 48 mm long and females being larger at 43–57 mm long. Females have longer, more slender limbs than males, while males possess vocal slits.

== Habitat and distribution ==
Atelopus gigas is only known from the type locality of La Victoria, Departamento Nariño near the border between Colombia and Ecuador.
