= Atelopus simulatus =

Conservation status
- Critically Endangered (IUCN 3.1)

Scientific classification
- Kingdom: Animalia
- Phylum: Chordata
- Class: Amphibia
- Order: Anura
- Family: Bufonidae
- Genus: Atelopus
- Species: A. simulatus

Binomial name
- Atelopus simulatus Ruíz-Carranza & Osorno-Muñoz, 1994

Species of amphibian

Atelopus simulatus, the Camouflaged Harlequin Toad, is a species of toad in the family Bufonidae. It is endemic to Colombia. Its natural habitats are subtropical or tropical moist montane forests and rivers. It is threatened by habitat loss.
