= Atelopus colomai =

Scientific classification
- Kingdom: Animalia
- Phylum: Chordata
- Class: Amphibia
- Order: Anura
- Family: Bufonidae
- Genus: Atelopus
- Species: A. colomai

Binomial name
- Atelopus colomai Plewnia et al., 2024

Species of frog

Atelopus colomai is a species of frog in the family Bufonidae, found only in the Ecuadorian Amazon Basin. Research on this amphibian, and the whole genus in general, is restricted due to the very low populations.
