= Atelopus walkeri =

Walker's stubfoot toad

Conservation status
- Data Deficient (IUCN 3.1)

Scientific classification
- Kingdom: Animalia
- Phylum: Chordata
- Class: Amphibia
- Order: Anura
- Family: Bufonidae
- Genus: Atelopus
- Species: A. walkeri

Binomial name
- Atelopus walkeri Rivero, 1963.

Species of amphibian

Atelopus walkeri, Walker's stubfoot toad, is a species of toad in the family Bufonidae endemic to Colombia. Its natural habitats are subtropical or tropical moist montane forests and rivers. It is threatened by habitat loss.
