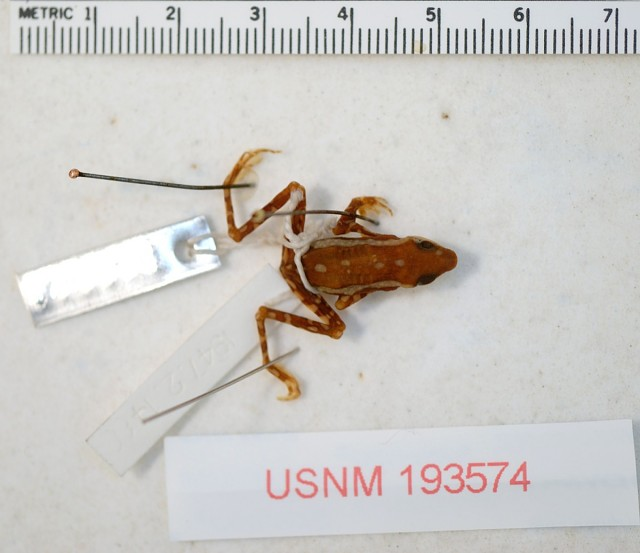

Conservation status
- Critically Endangered (IUCN 3.1)

Scientific classification
- Kingdom: Animalia
- Phylum: Chordata
- Class: Amphibia
- Order: Anura
- Family: Bufonidae
- Genus: Atelopus
- Species: A. tricolor

Binomial name
- Atelopus tricolor Boulenger, 1902

Synonyms
- Atelopus rugulosus Noble, 1921; Atelopus willimani Donoso-Barros, 1969

= Three-coloured harlequin toad =

Species of amphibian

The three-coloured harlequin toad (Atelopus tricolor) is a species of toad in the family Bufonidae. It is found in Bolivia and Peru. Its natural habitats are subtropical or tropical moist montane forests and rivers. It is threatened by habitat loss.

== Characteristics ==
They have slim body; head is longer than broad; snout acuminate; nostril lateral not visible from above; eye width is about the same length as distance from nostril to anterior corner of eye. Loreal area barely convex; upper lip fleshy; immediate lateral postorbital are convex; temporal area slightly convex; tympanum absent; dorsal postorbital crest developed but not prominent. Tibia long; foot shorter than tibia; relative length of toes: 1<2<3<5<4; metatarsal tubercles poorly developed.

== Sources ==
- IUCN SSC Amphibian Specialist Group (2020). "Atelopus tricolor". IUCN Red List of Threatened Species. 2020 e.T54559A89196685.
