= Atelopus sonsonensis =

Conservation status
- Critically Endangered (IUCN 3.1)

Scientific classification
- Kingdom: Animalia
- Phylum: Chordata
- Class: Amphibia
- Order: Anura
- Family: Bufonidae
- Genus: Atelopus
- Species: A. sonsonensis

Binomial name
- Atelopus sonsonensis Vélez-Rodríguez & Ruíz-Carranza, 1997

Species of amphibian

Atelopus sonsonensis is a species of toad in the family Bufonidae. It is endemic to Colombia and only known from its type locality in Sonsón, Antioquia Department, on the eastern slope of the Cordillera Central at 1,500 m (4,900 ft) asl.

Atelopus sonsonensis is a ground-dwelling toad that occurs in the under-storey of forest along streams. It breeds in the streams. Major threats to the species are chytridiomycosis and habitat loss.
