= Atelopus boulengeri =

Conservation status
- Critically Endangered (IUCN 3.1)

Scientific classification
- Kingdom: Animalia
- Phylum: Chordata
- Class: Amphibia
- Order: Anura
- Family: Bufonidae
- Genus: Atelopus
- Species: A. boulengeri

Binomial name
- Atelopus boulengeri Peracca, 1904

Synonyms
- Atelopus bicolor Noble, 1921

Species of amphibian

Atelopus boulengeri, Boulenger's stubfoot toad, is a small species of toad in the family Bufonidae endemic to humid montane forest in southern Ecuador. It has not been seen since 1984, but some of the known sites have not been well surveyed, so it may still survive. The threats are habitat loss and the disease chytridiomycosis.
