= Atelopus siranus =

Conservation status
- Data Deficient (IUCN 3.1)

Scientific classification
- Kingdom: Animalia
- Phylum: Chordata
- Class: Amphibia
- Order: Anura
- Family: Bufonidae
- Genus: Atelopus
- Species: A. siranus

Binomial name
- Atelopus siranus Lötters & Henzl, 2000

Species of amphibian

Atelopus siranus is a species of toad in the family Bufonidae.

It is endemic to Peru. Its natural habitats are subtropical or tropical moist lowland forests, subtropical or tropical moist montane forests, and rivers. It is known from Serrania de Sira in the upper Amazon basin of eastern central Peru and also occurs in El Sira Communal Reserve; only a few specimens have been collected and has not been sighted since 1988. This isolated area has little human disturbance so the only known threats are chytridiomycosis and pet trade although these threats may not be significant.
