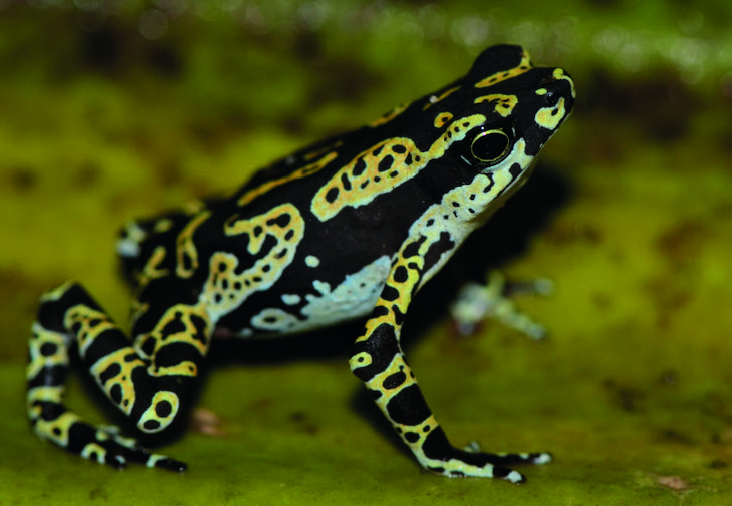
- Amapá, Brazil

Scientific classification
- Kingdom: Animalia
- Phylum: Chordata
- Class: Amphibia
- Order: Anura
- Family: Bufonidae
- Genus: Atelopus
- Species: A. hoogmoedi

Binomial name
- Atelopus hoogmoedi Lescure, 1974

= Atelopus hoogmoedi =

Species of amphibian

Atelopus hoogmoedi, also known by its common name Hoogmoed's harlequinfrog, is a species from the genus Atelopus. This species was originally described by Jean Lescure in 1974.

== Gallery ==
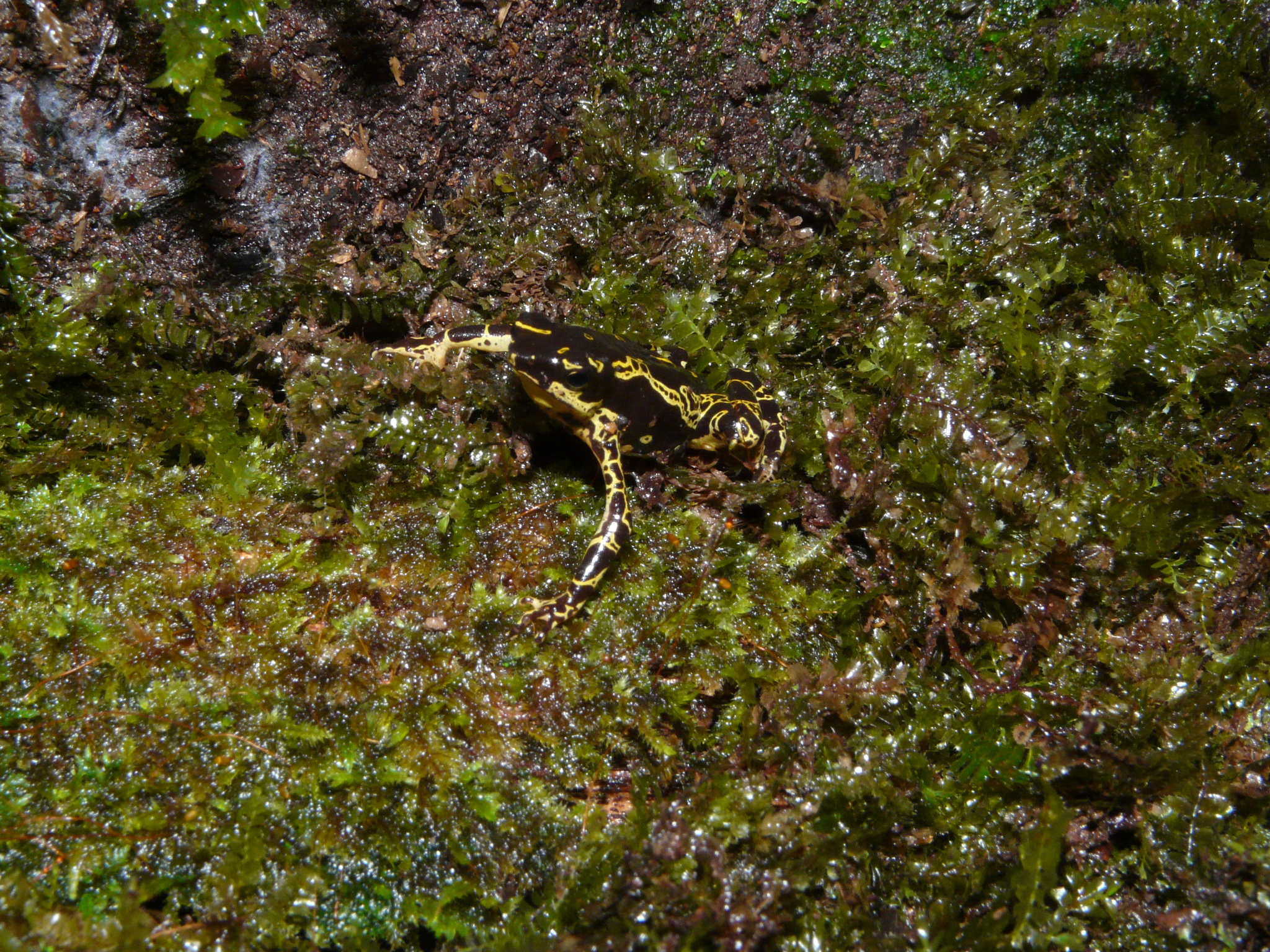

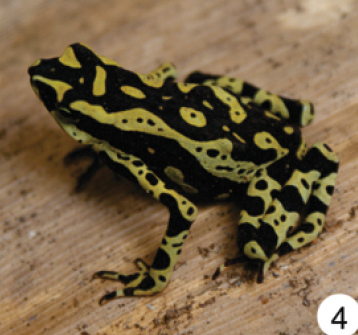
Amapá, Brazil

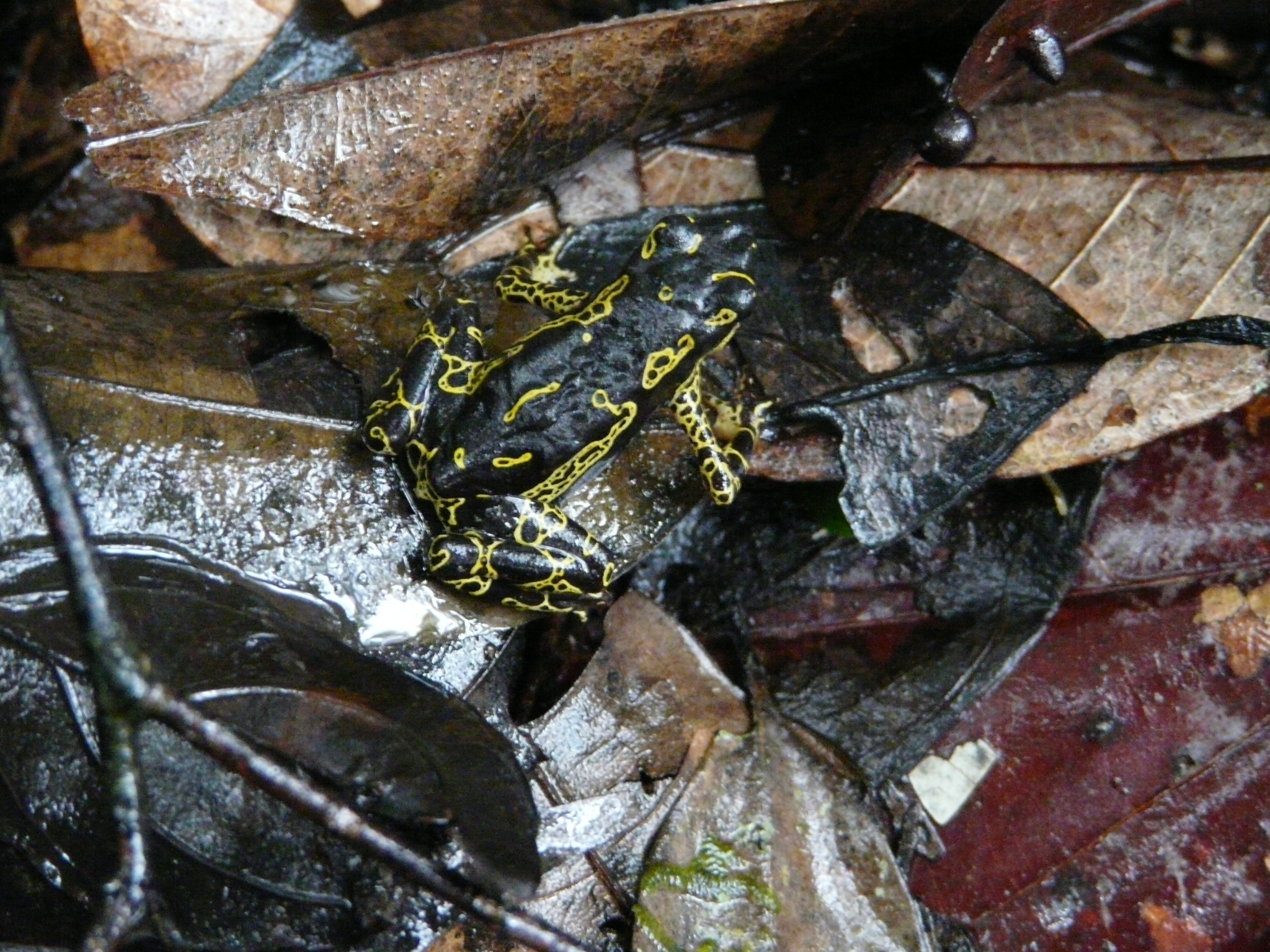
Suriname

== Sources ==
- Amphibian & reptile conservation. Vol. v.5:no.3=no.8 (2011–2012). Amphibian & Reptile Conservation. 2012. p. 43.
- Amphibian & reptile conservation. Vol. v.5:no.3=no.8 (2011–2012). Amphibian & Reptile Conservation. 2012. p. 40.
- Amphibian & reptile conservation. Vol. v.11:no.1=no.20 (2017). Amphibian & Reptile Conservation. 2017. p. 45.
- Amphibian & reptile conservation. Vol. v.11:no.1=no.20 (2017). Amphibian & Reptile Conservation. 2017. p. 46.
- Amphibian & reptile conservation. Vol. v.11:no.1=no.20 (2017). Amphibian & Reptile Conservation. 2017. p. 47.
- Amphibian & reptile conservation. Vol. v.11:no.1=no.20 (2017). Amphibian & Reptile Conservation. 2017. p. 48.
- Amphibian & reptile conservation. Vol. v.11:no.1=no.20 (2017). Amphibian & Reptile Conservation. 2017. p. 49.
