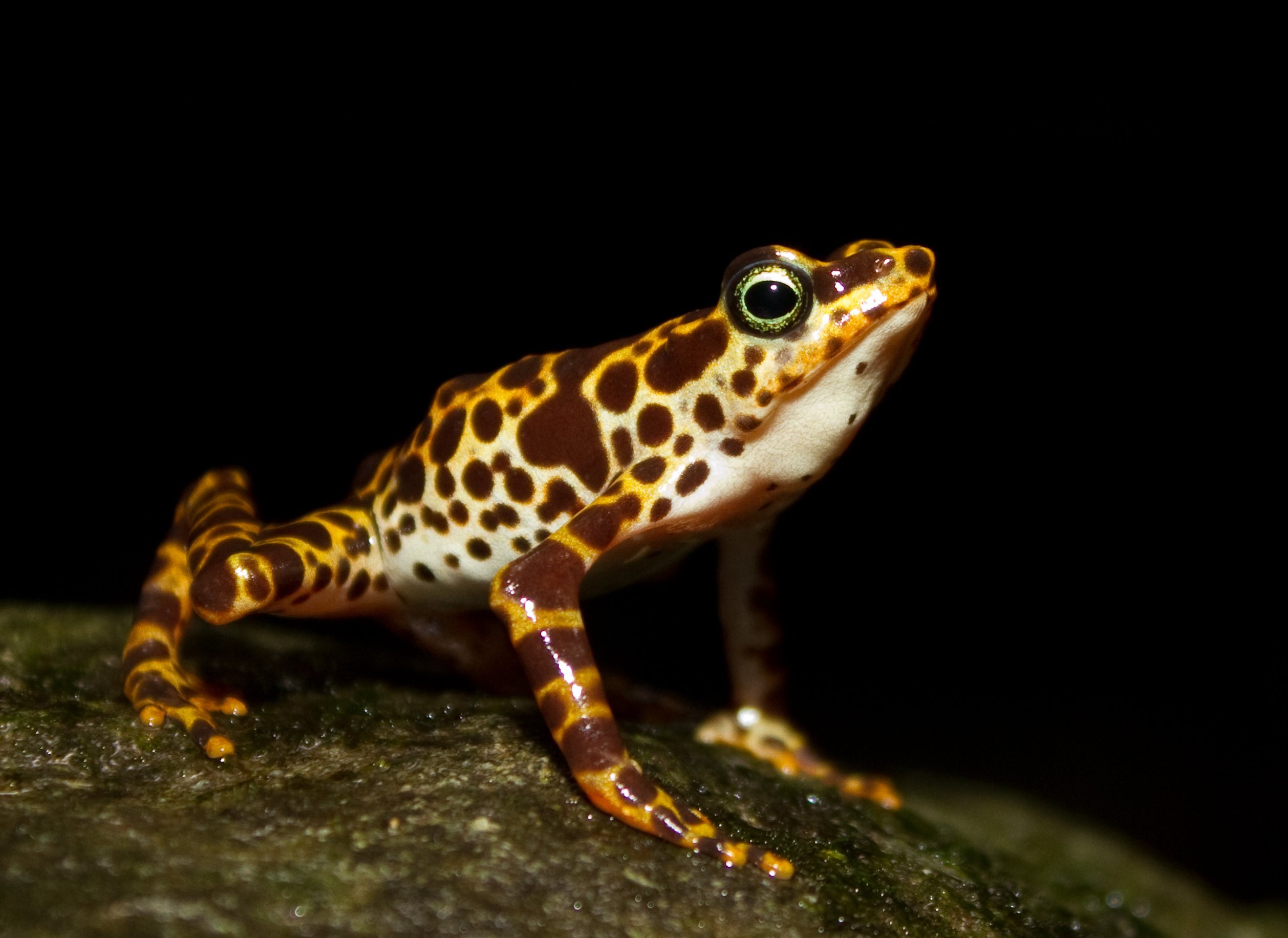
- Male A. certus

Scientific classification
- Kingdom: Animalia
- Phylum: Chordata
- Class: Amphibia
- Order: Anura
- Family: Bufonidae
- Genus: Atelopus; Duméril and Bibron, 1841

Species
- See text

Synonyms
- Ateleopus Agassiz, 1846 (unjustified emendation)

= Atelopus =

Genus of amphibians

Atelopus is a large genus of Bufonidae, commonly known as harlequin frogs or toads, from Central and South America, ranging as far north as Costa Rica and as far south as Bolivia. Atelopus species are small, generally brightly colored, and diurnal. Most species are associated with mid-to-high elevation streams.

This genus has been greatly affected by amphibian declines, with about 70% of species now considered endangered or extinct. While threatened by habitat loss, pollution, and introduced species, the primary cause of these declines appears to be the chytrid fungus Batrachochytrium dendrobatidis.

Almost 40% of the described species in the genus are considered possibly extinct; this is raised to 45% when data deficient species are added; this number may be even higher, given that the genus contains many undescribed species that could also be extinct, and many of the species considered critically endangered but extant may have gone extinct after the last surveys that detected them, or could go extinct in the future. For example, there are 32 known Atelopus species (including half a dozen undescribed) in Ecuador. One of these is data deficient (its status is unclear), two are endangered and the remaining are critically endangered. Almost half the Ecuador species have not been recorded in a decade or more and are likely extinct. In some species conservationists have established captive colonies as a safeguard. However, of 80 species that had not been seen since the 1950s, 32 have been sighted in the 21st Century, albeit at dangerously low population numbers. Among the Atelopus species that have been rediscovered decades after their last sighting have been A. arsyescue, A. mindoensis, A. bomolochos, A. ignescens, A. balios, A. longirostris, A. subornatus, A. varius, A. carbonerensis and possibly A. guanujo. The mechanism whereby these species survived extinction remains to be discovered.

New Atelopus species are discovered with some regularity, and many new species have been described in the last decade. Among others, a new subspecies, popularly dubbed the purple fluorescent frog, was discovered in 2007 by scientists Paul Ouboter and Jan Mol during a follow-up survey of the Nassau plateau in Suriname. Leeanne Alonso from Conservation International, the organisation that led the expedition, said this frog may be threatened by illegal gold mining. It was described as a new subspecies of Atelopus hoogmoedi (itself considered a subspecies of A. spumarius by some), named A. h. nassaui in 2012. Two new species were also described in 2020: A. manauensis and A. moropukaqumir, both of which are highly threatened by the chytrid fungus and habitat destruction. Another new species, A. frontizero, was described in 2021.

== Species ==
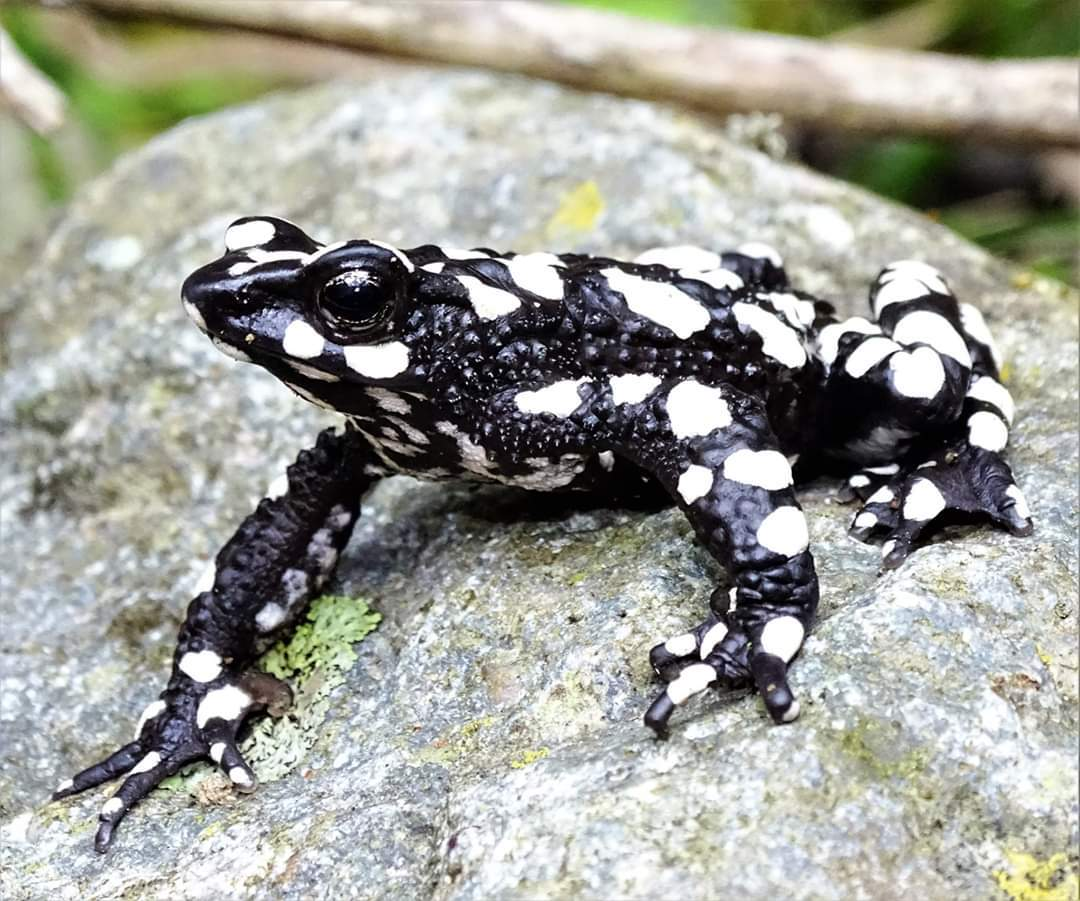
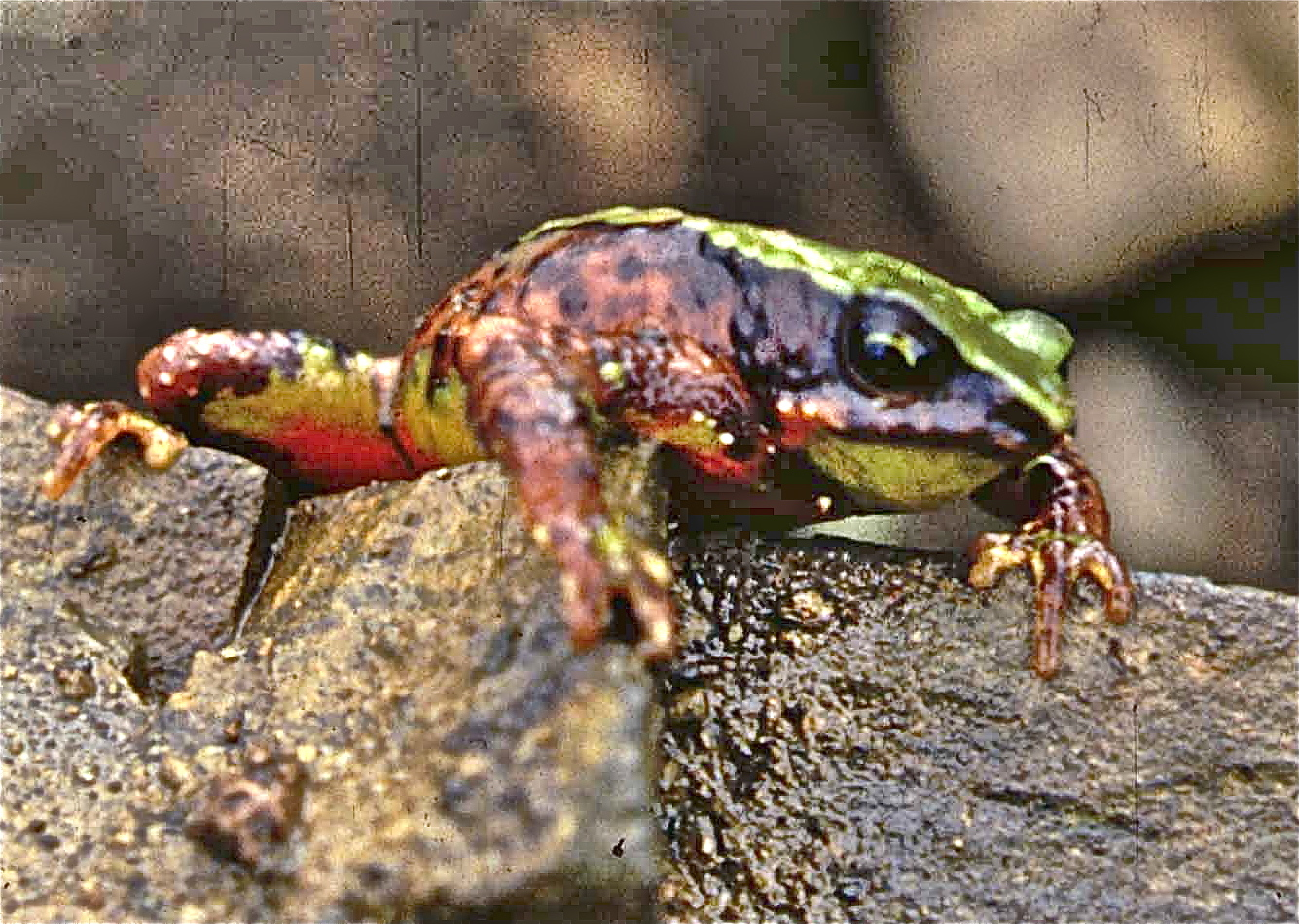
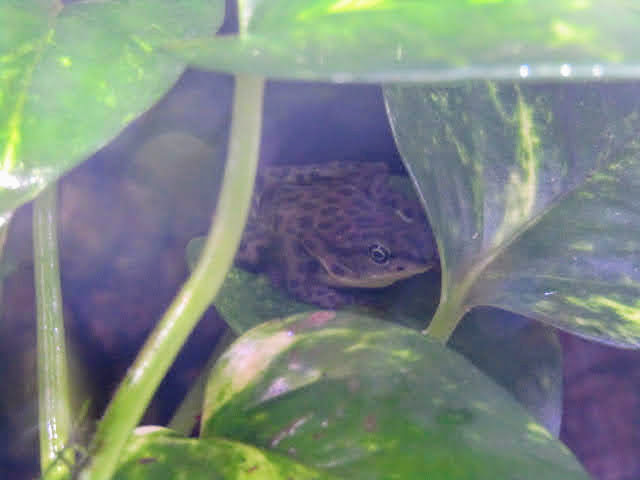
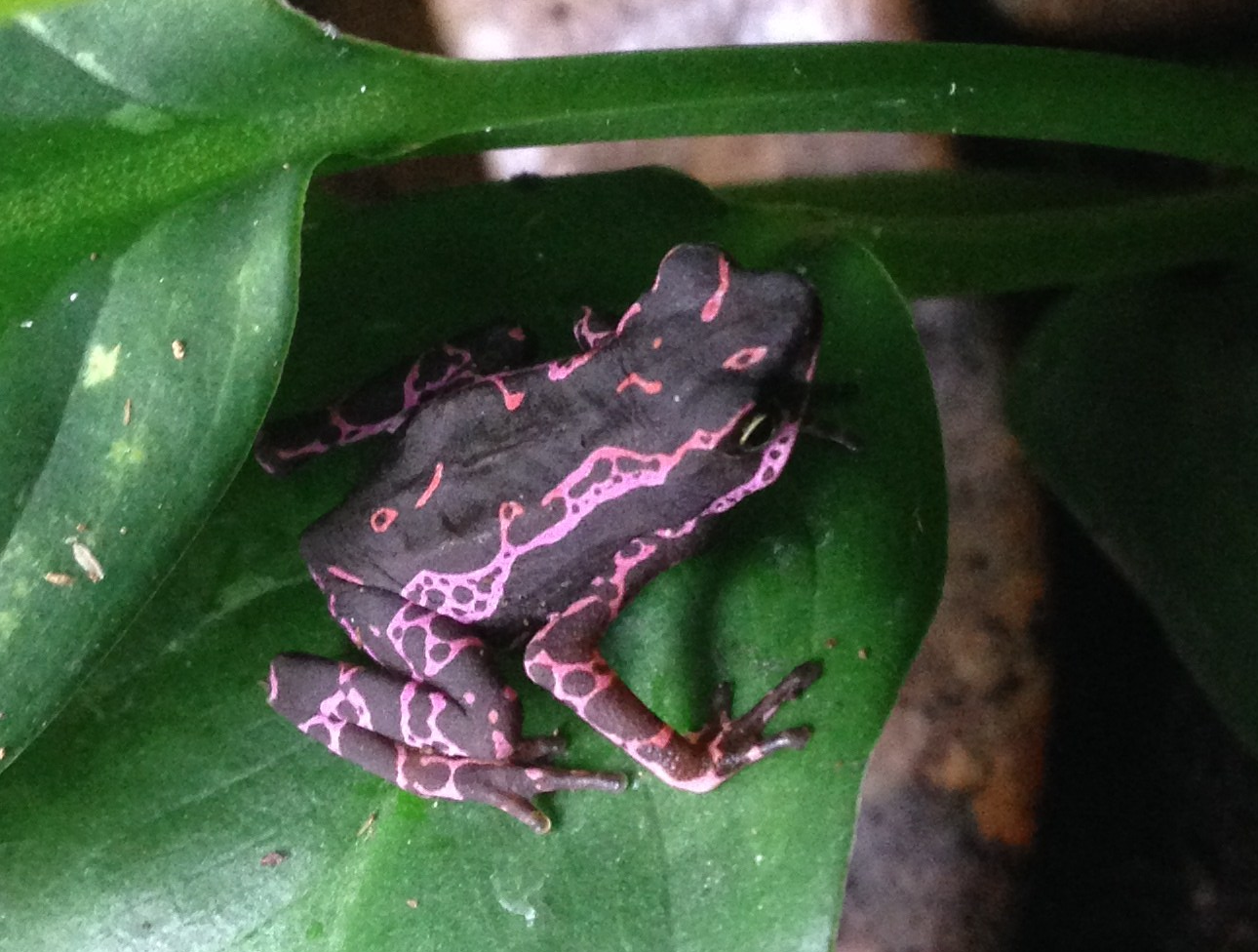
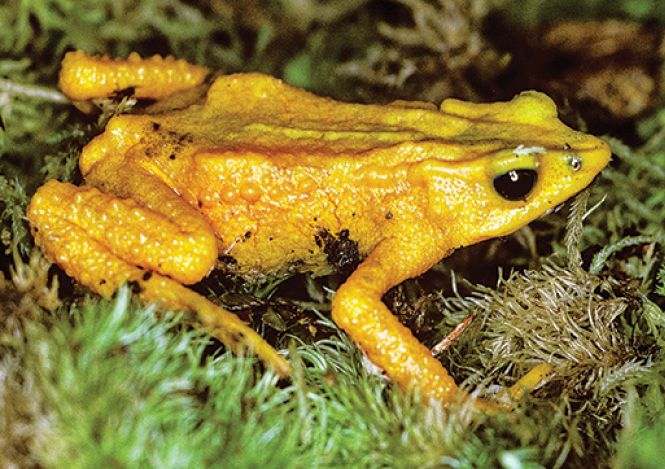
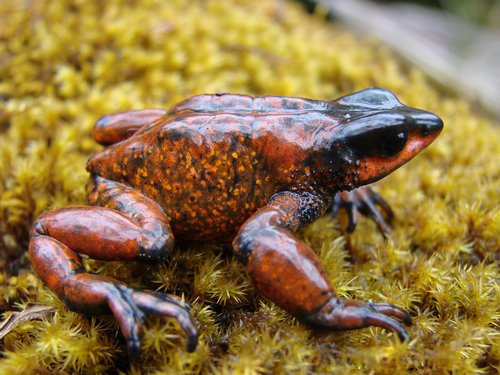
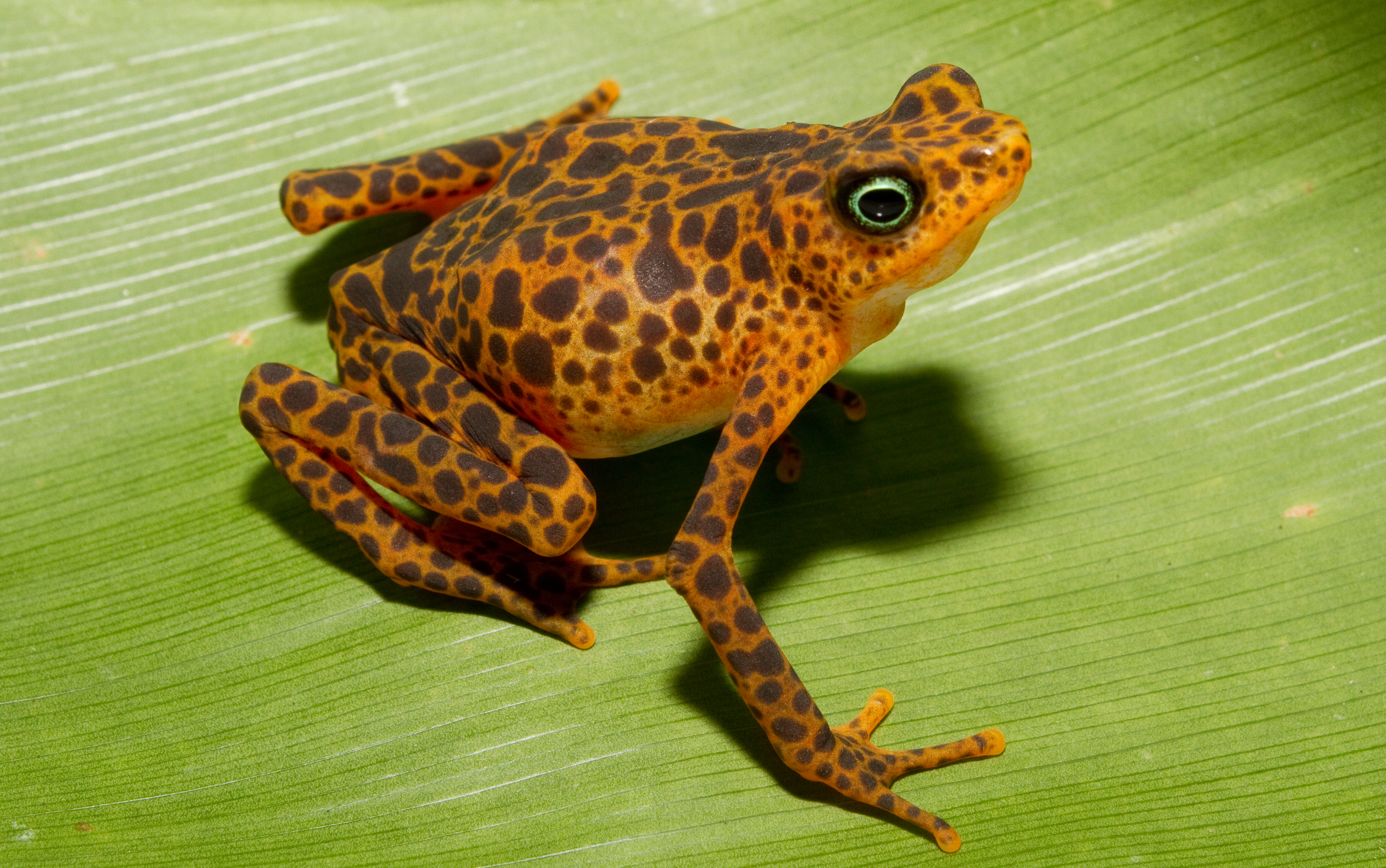
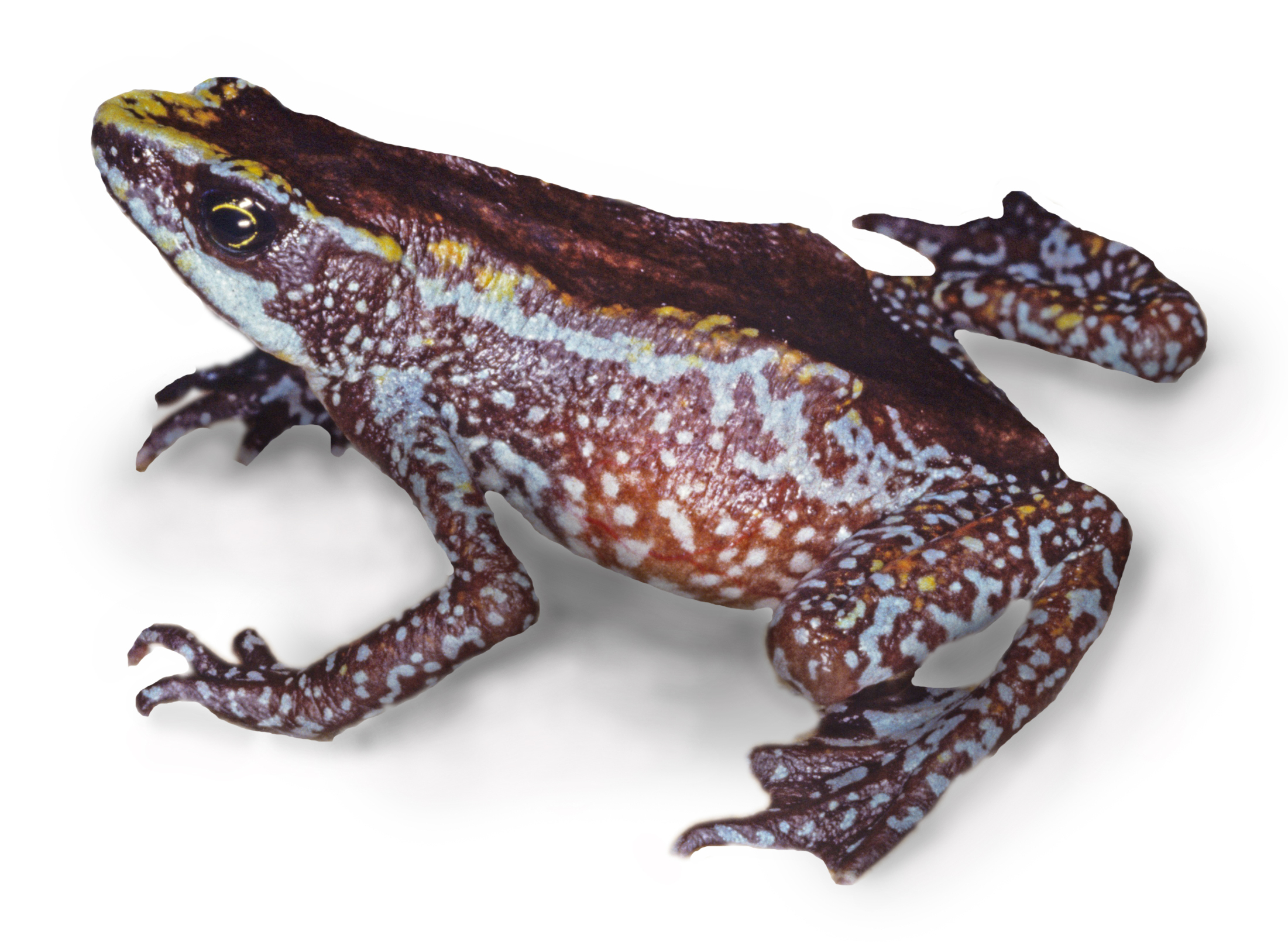
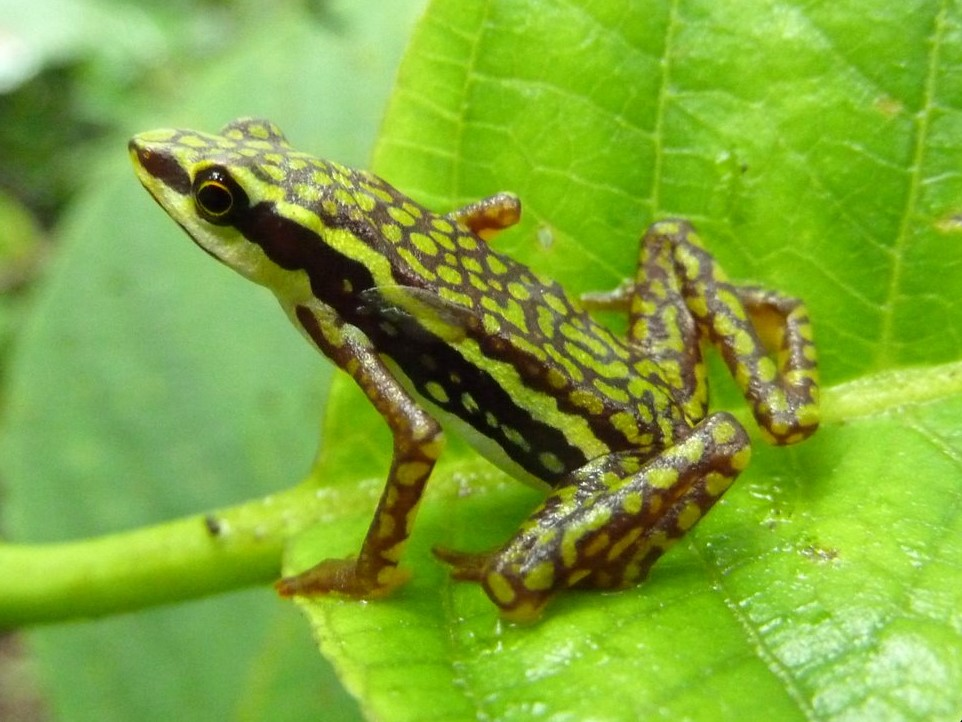
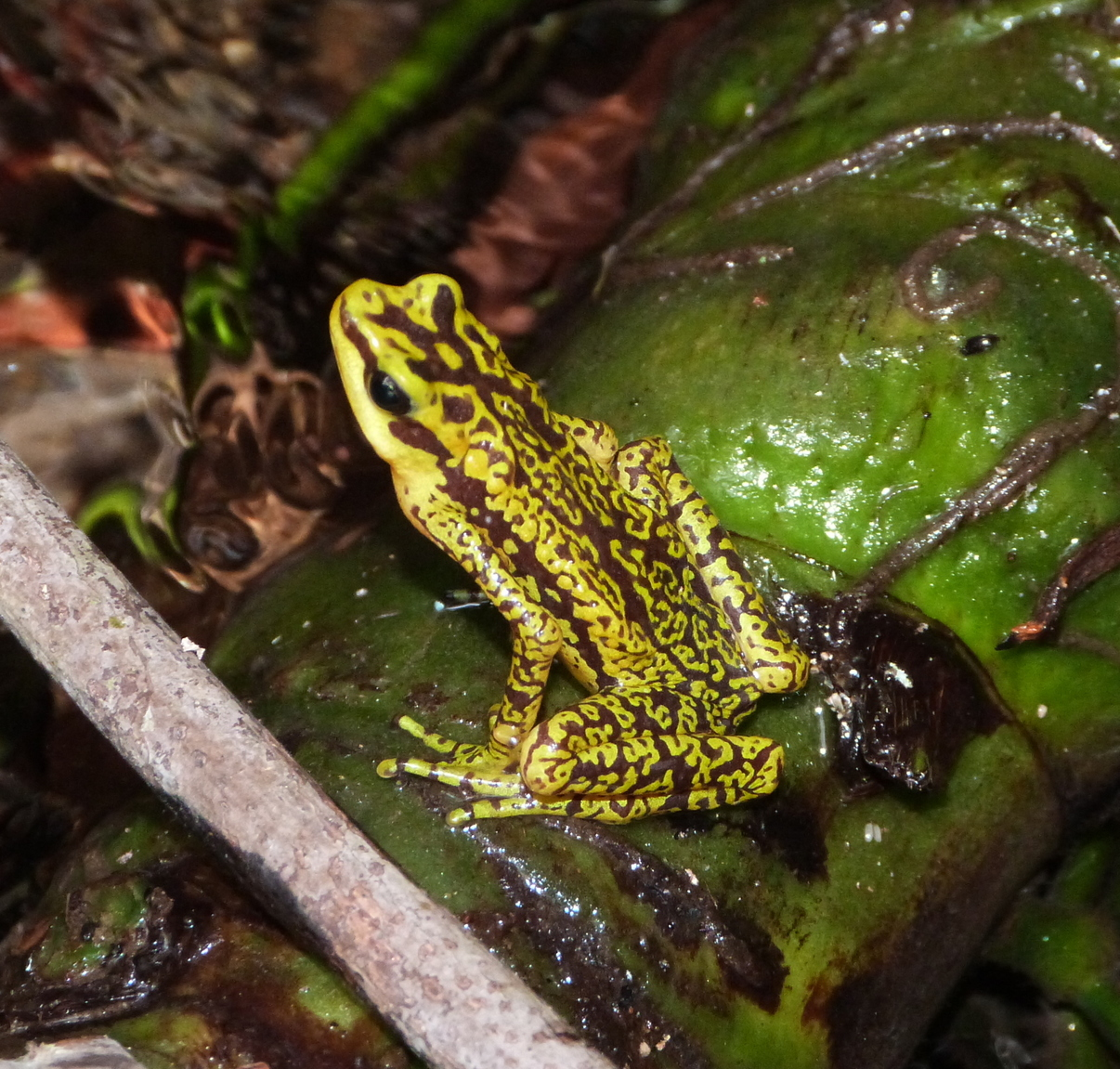
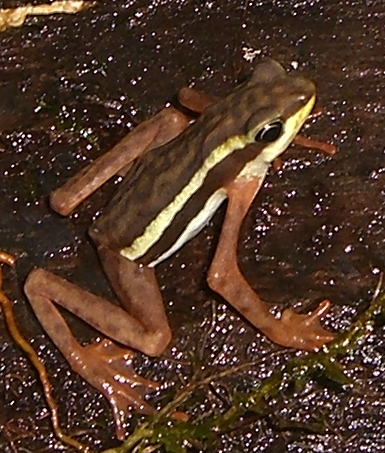
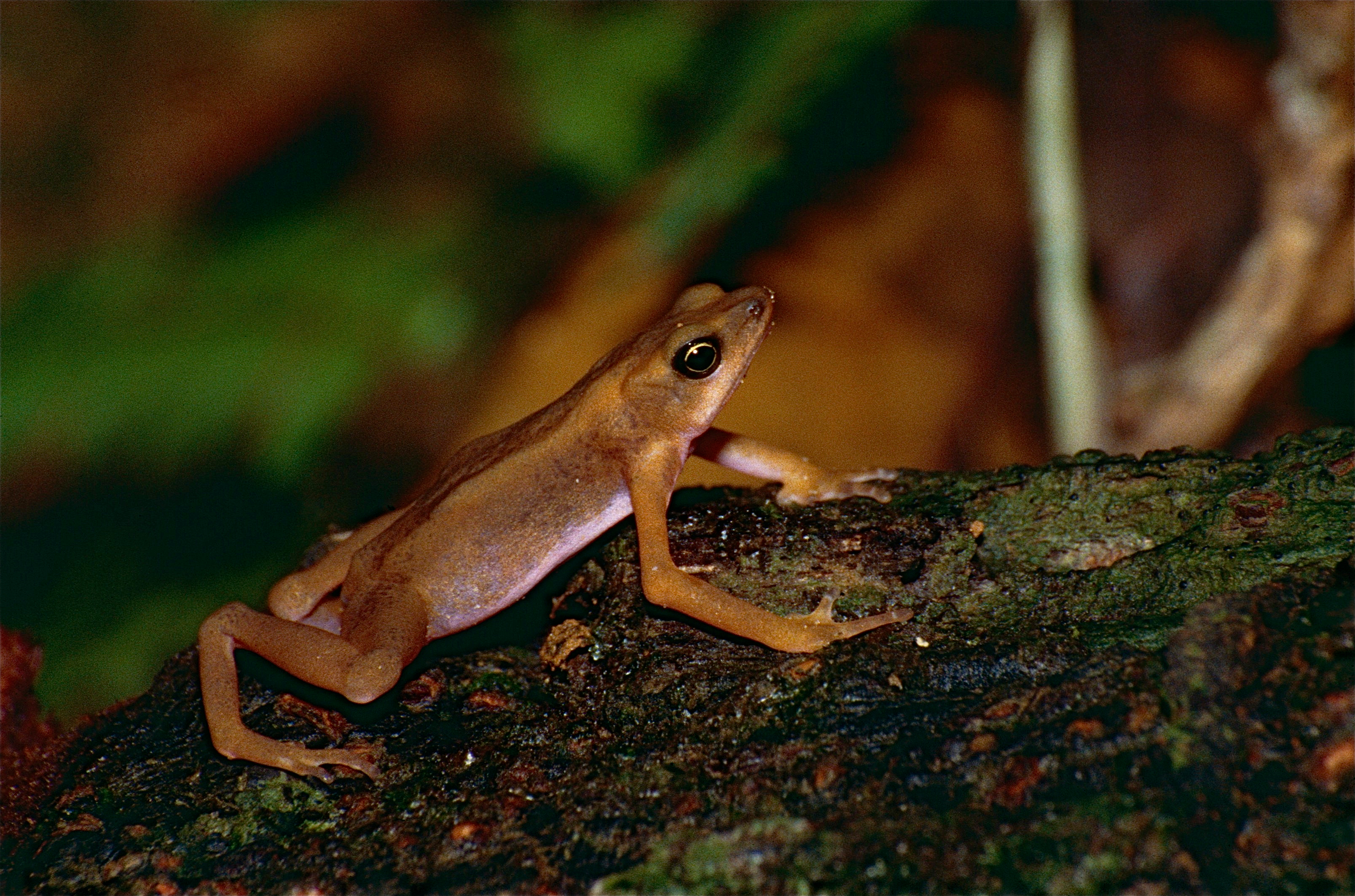
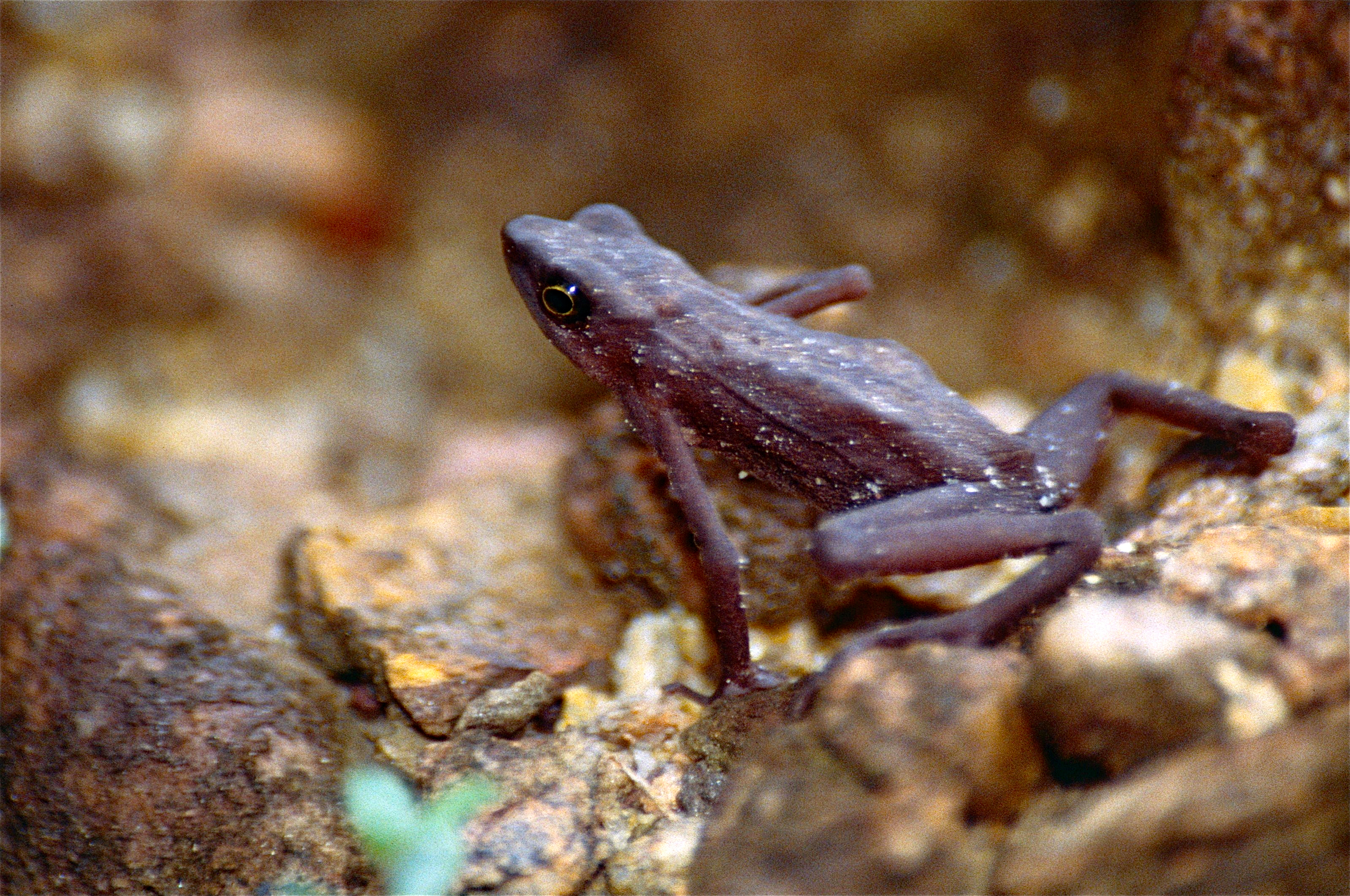
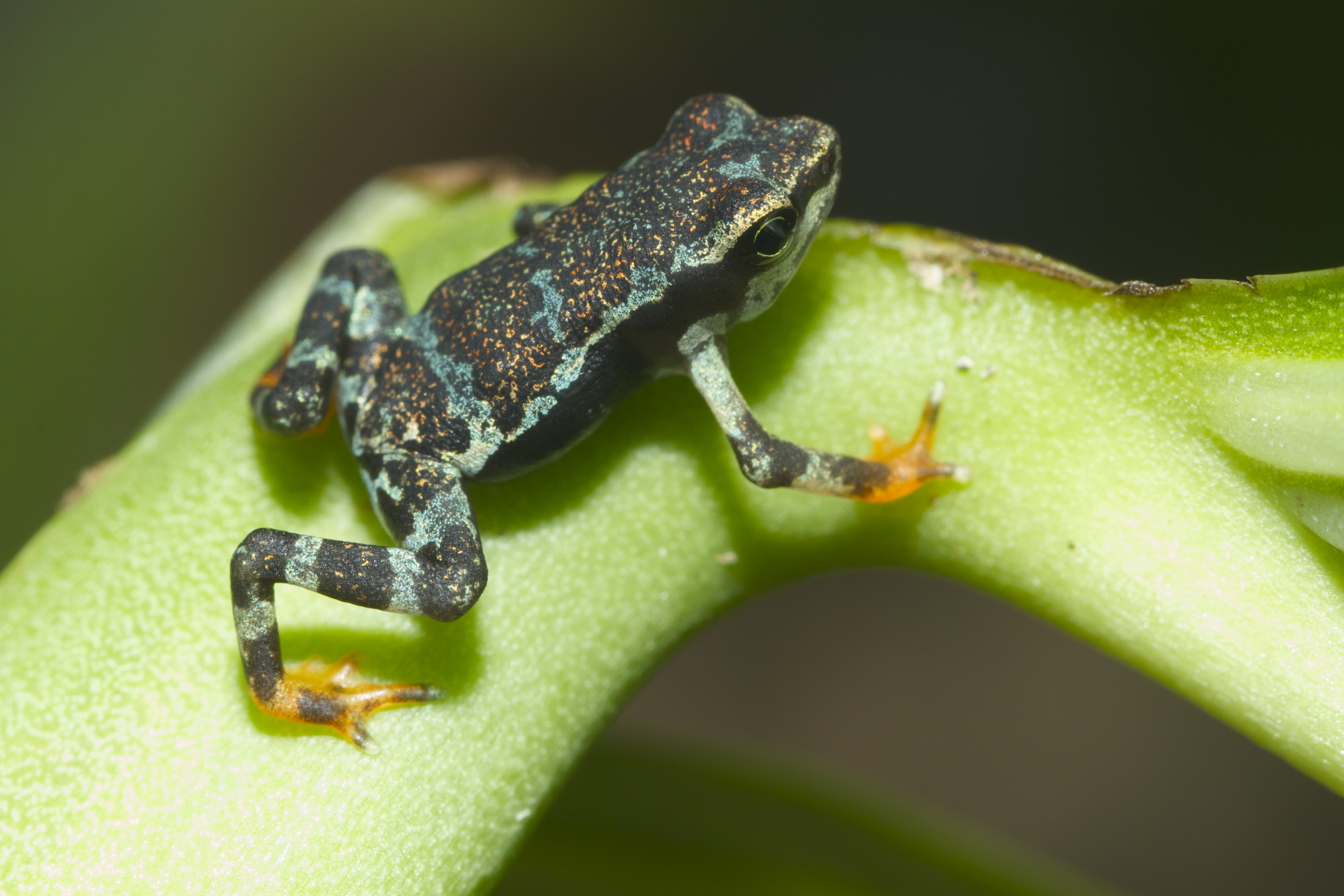
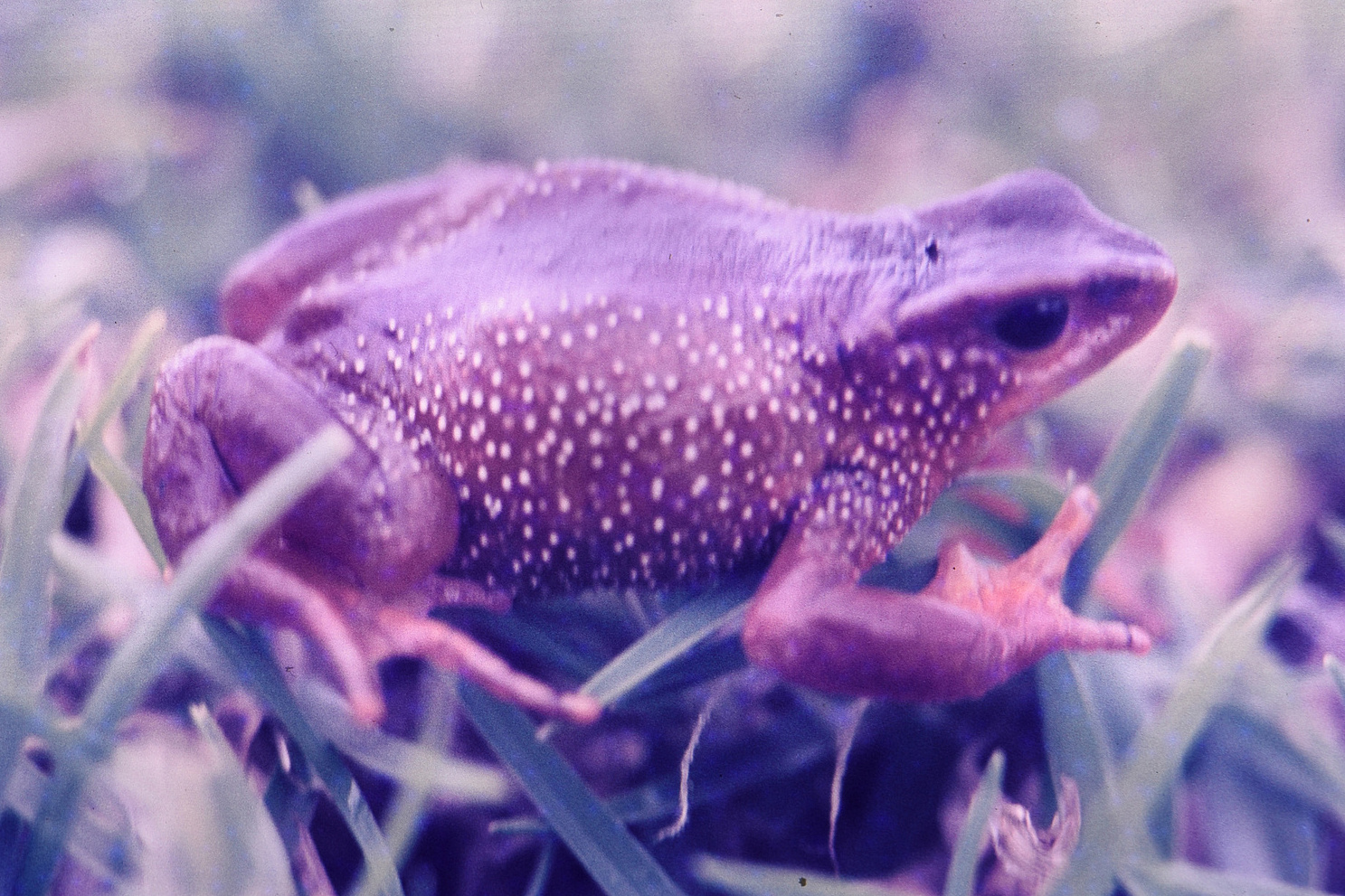
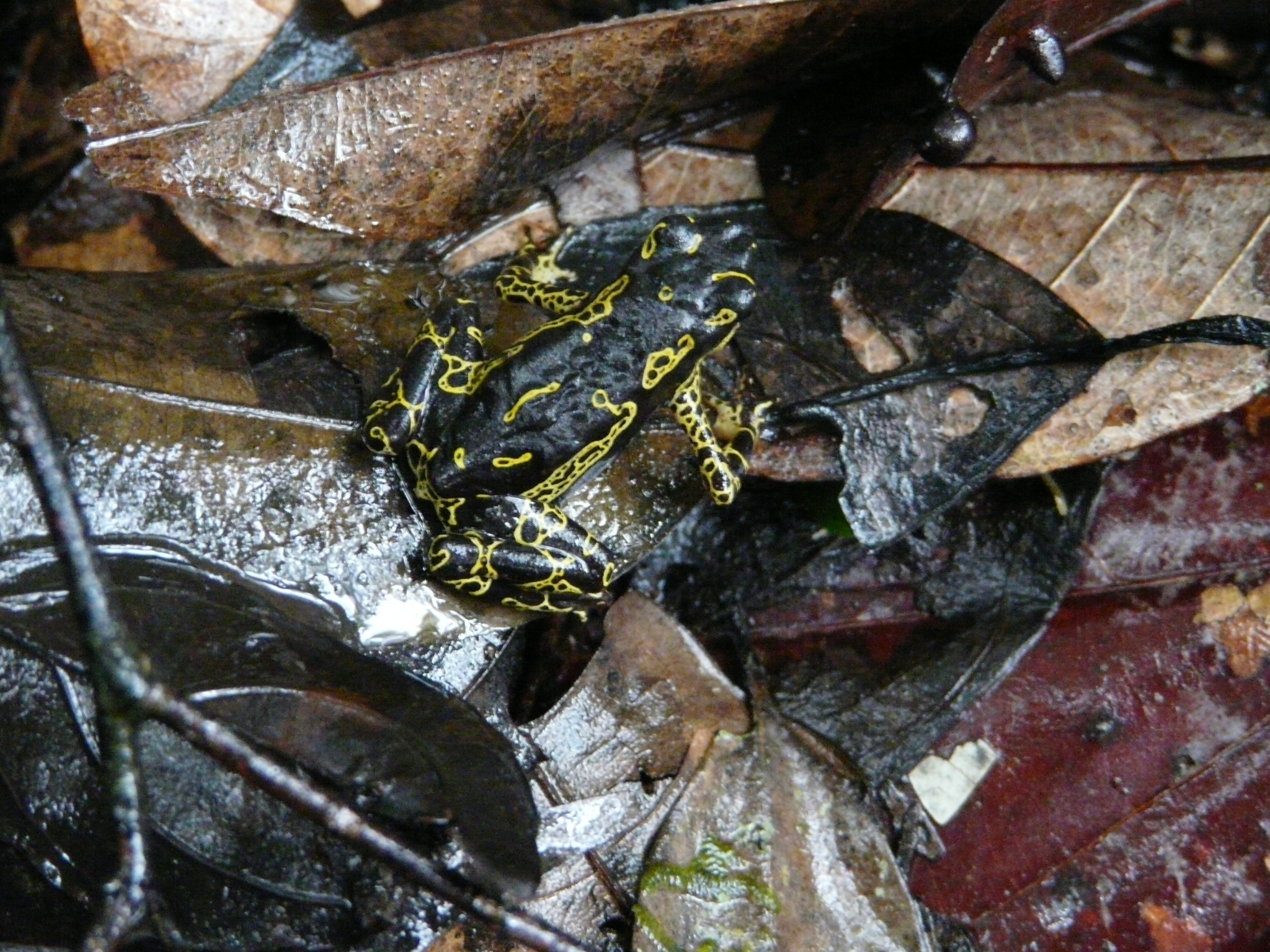
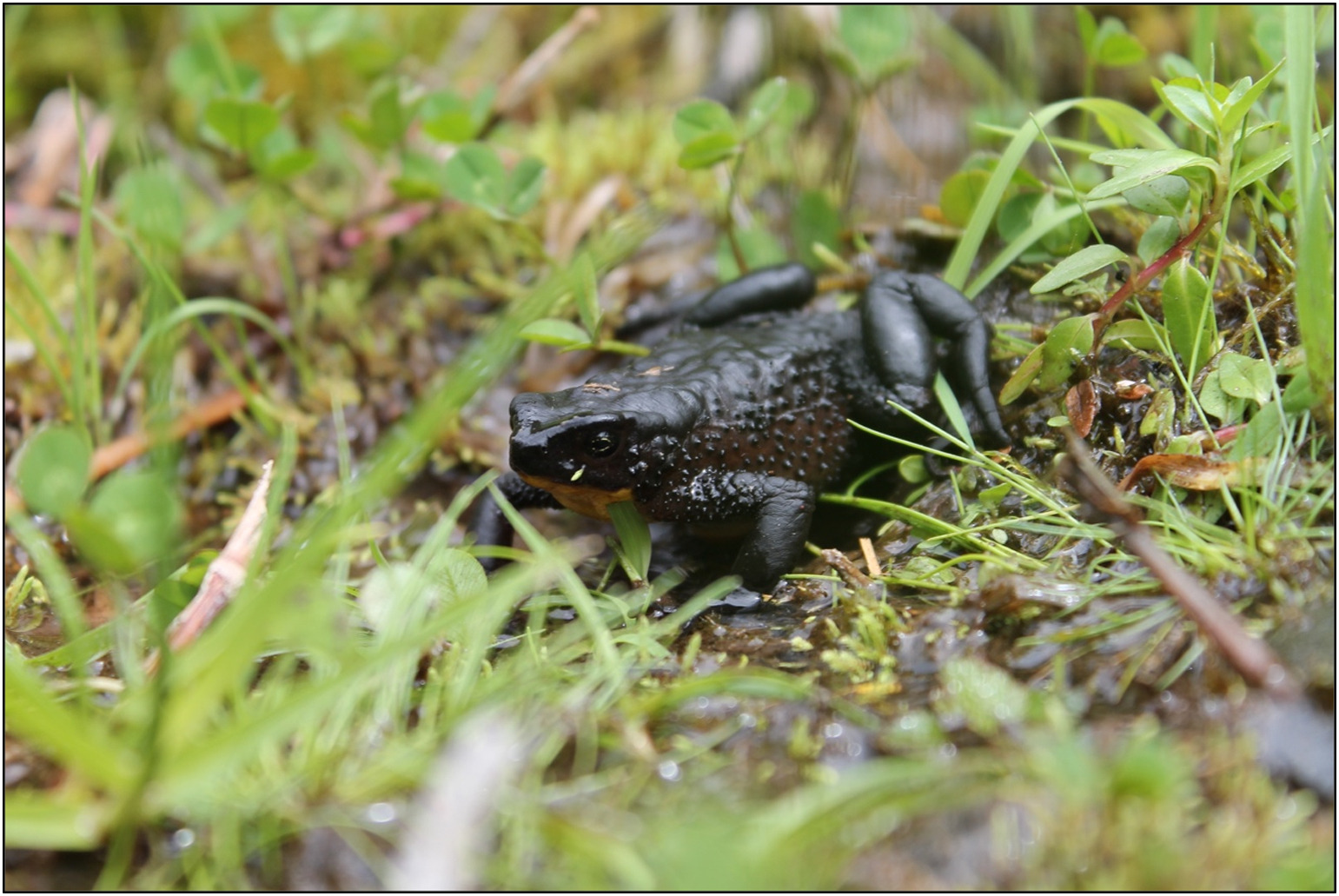
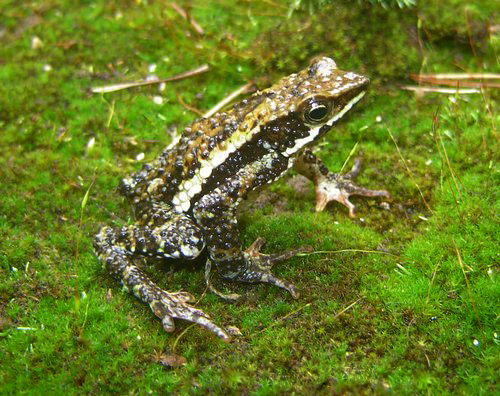
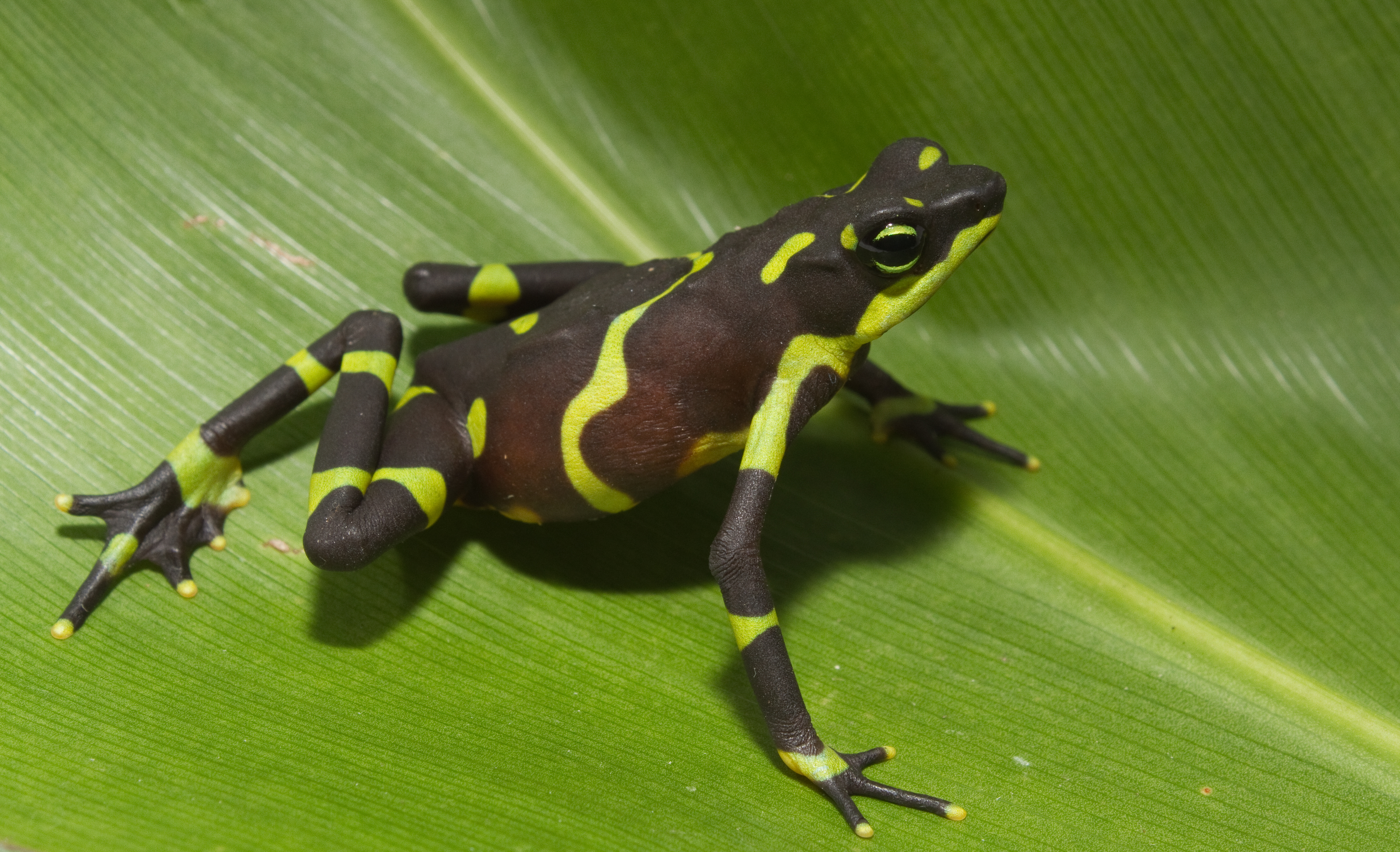
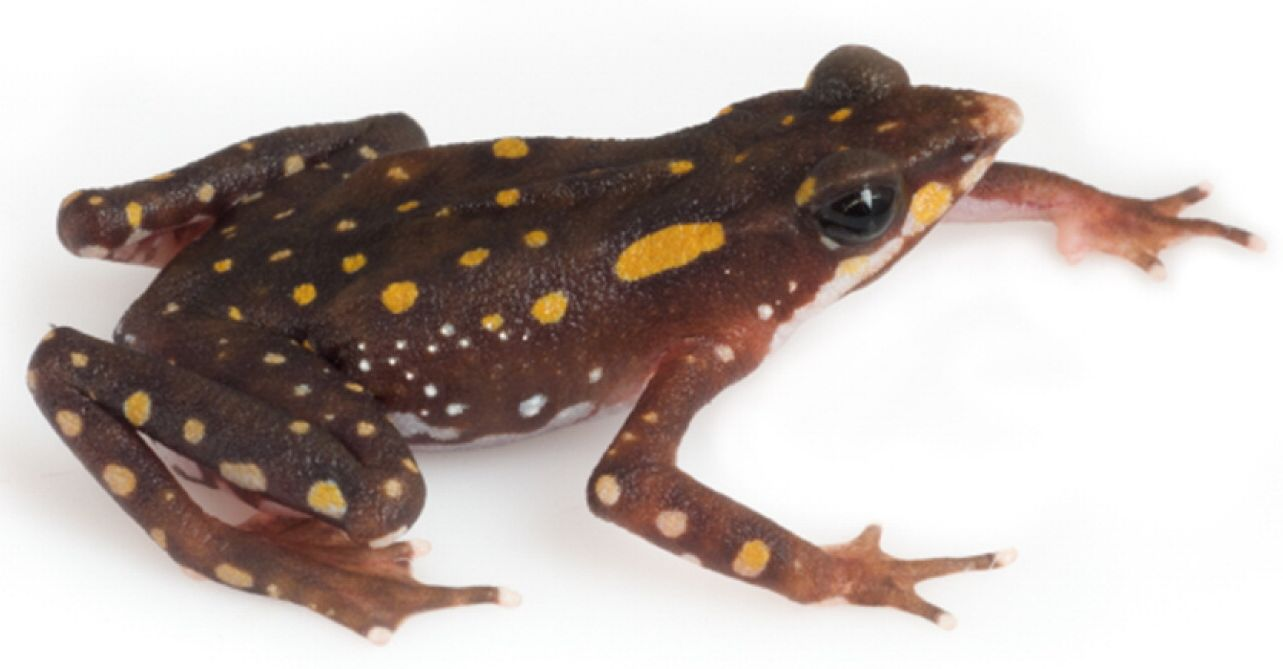
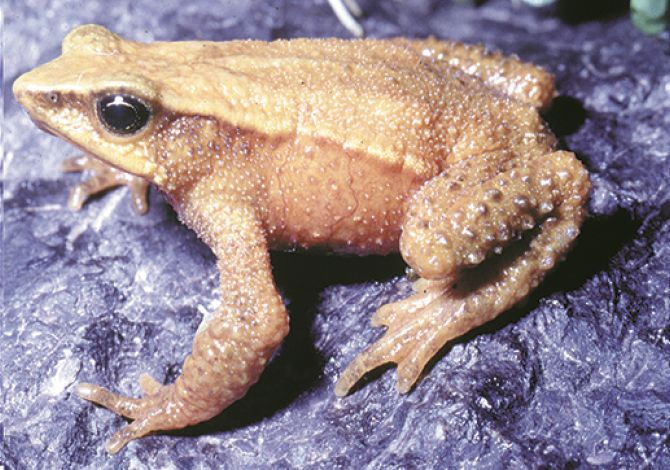
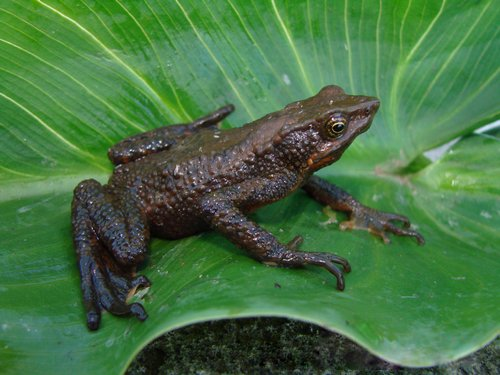
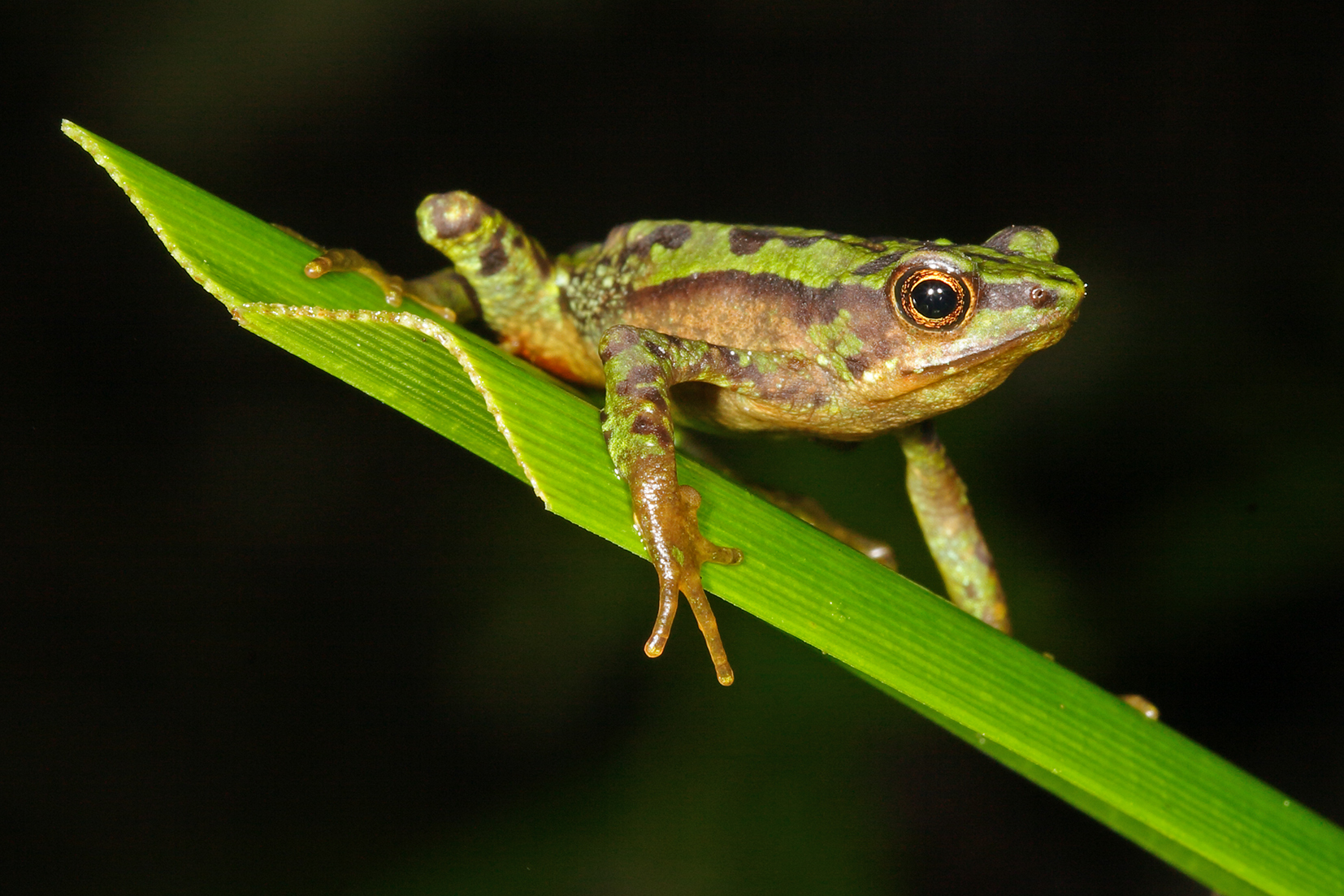
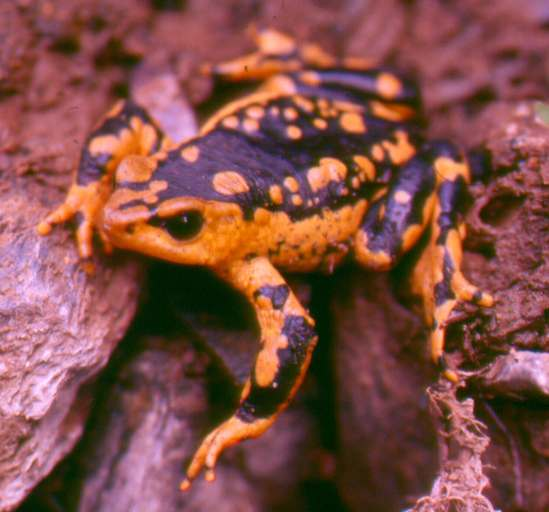
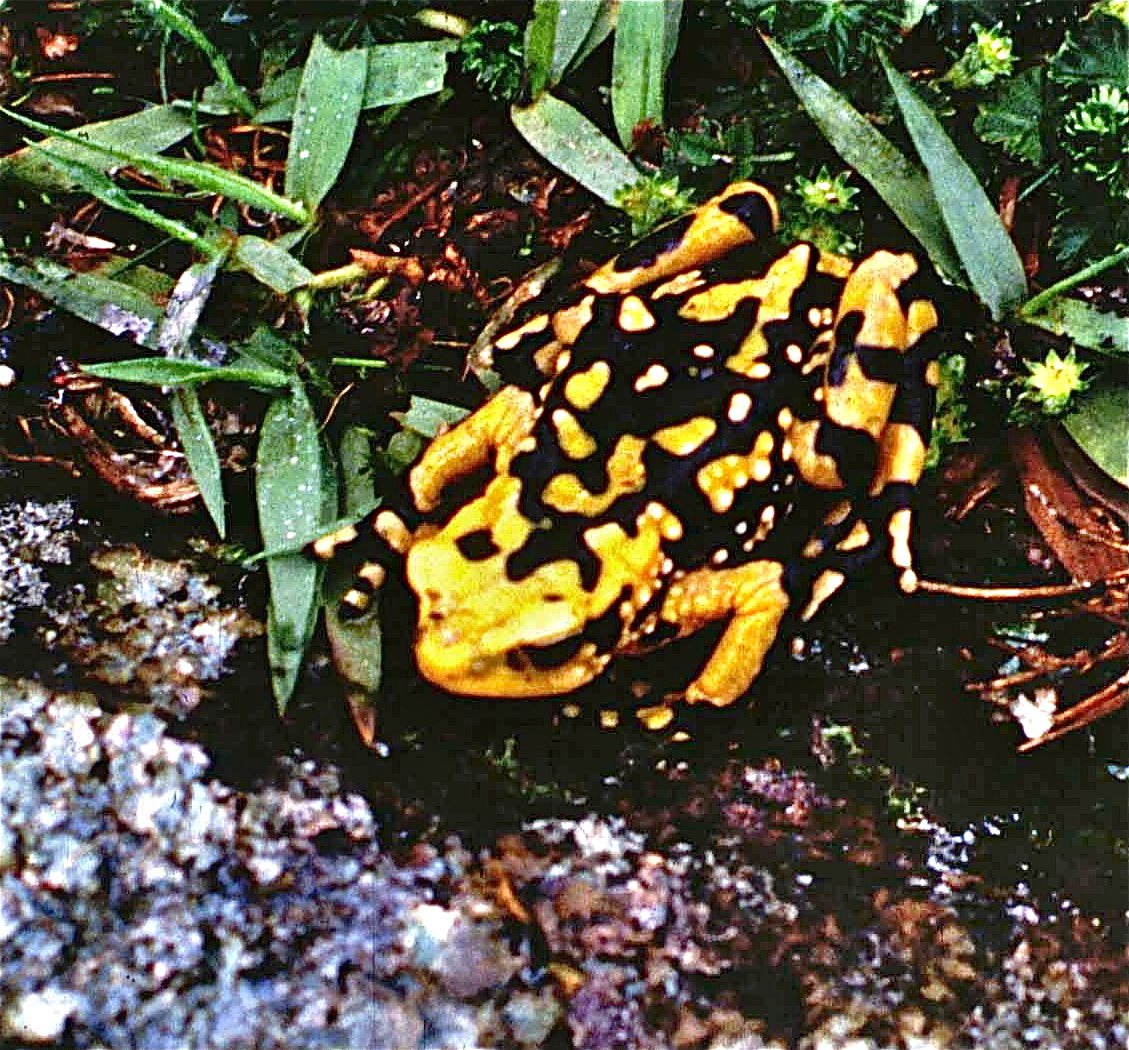
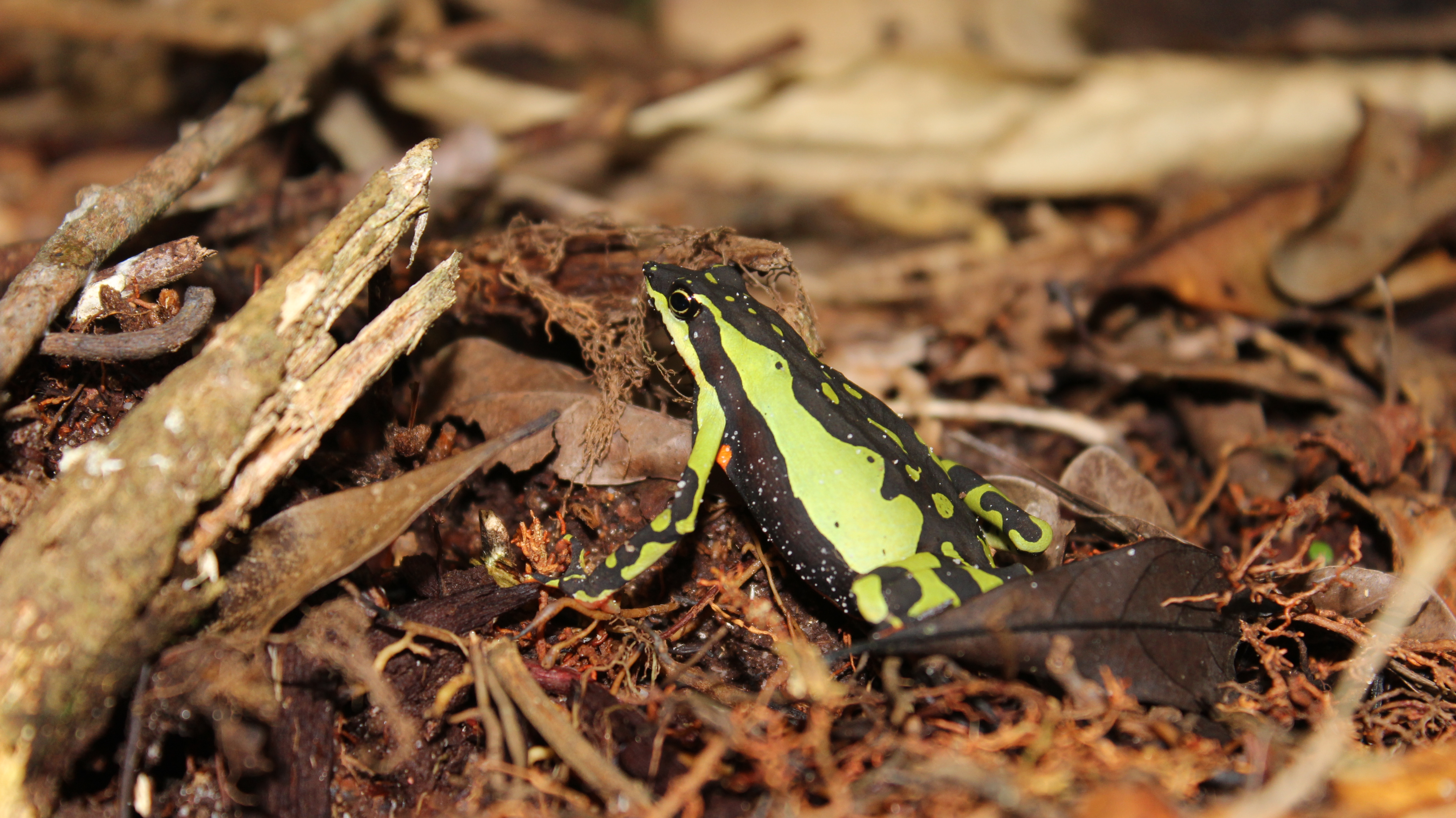
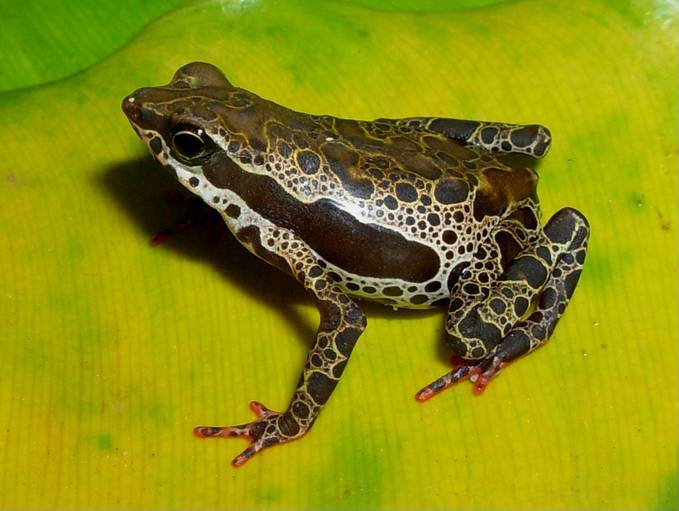
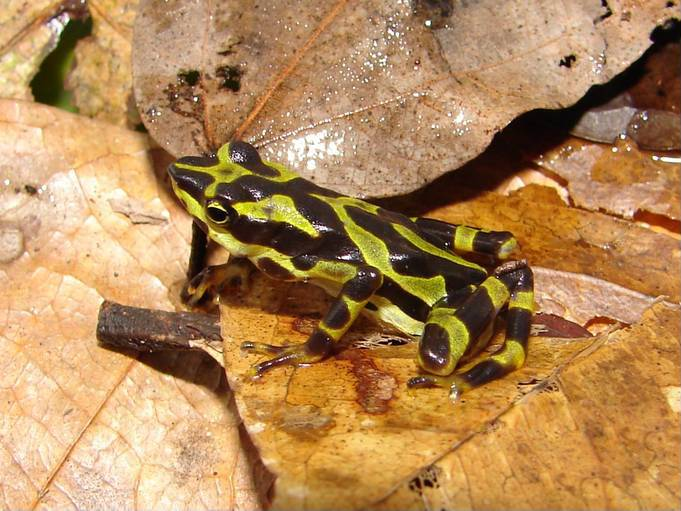
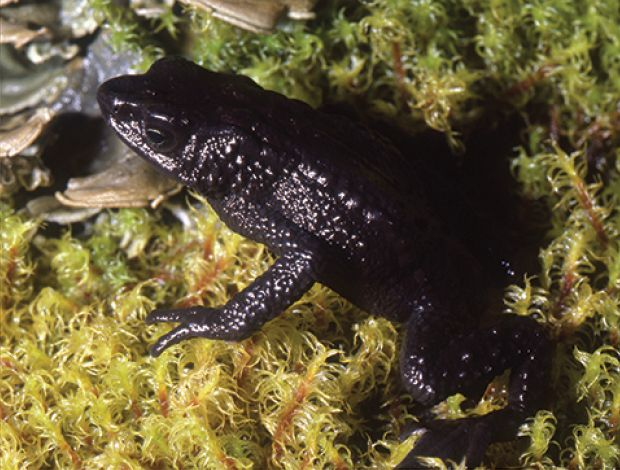
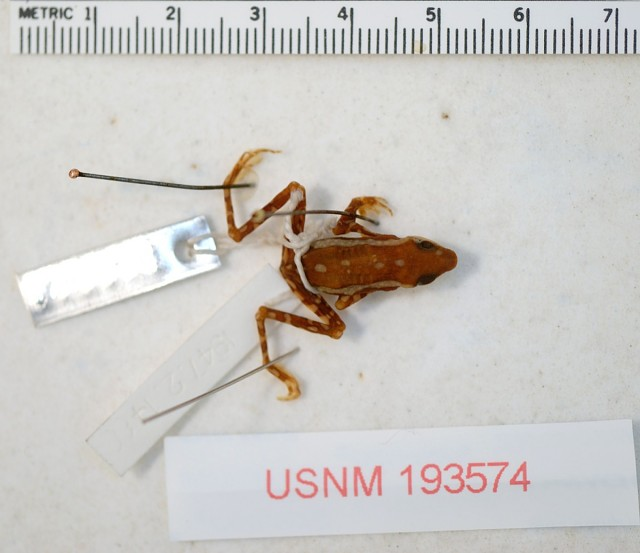
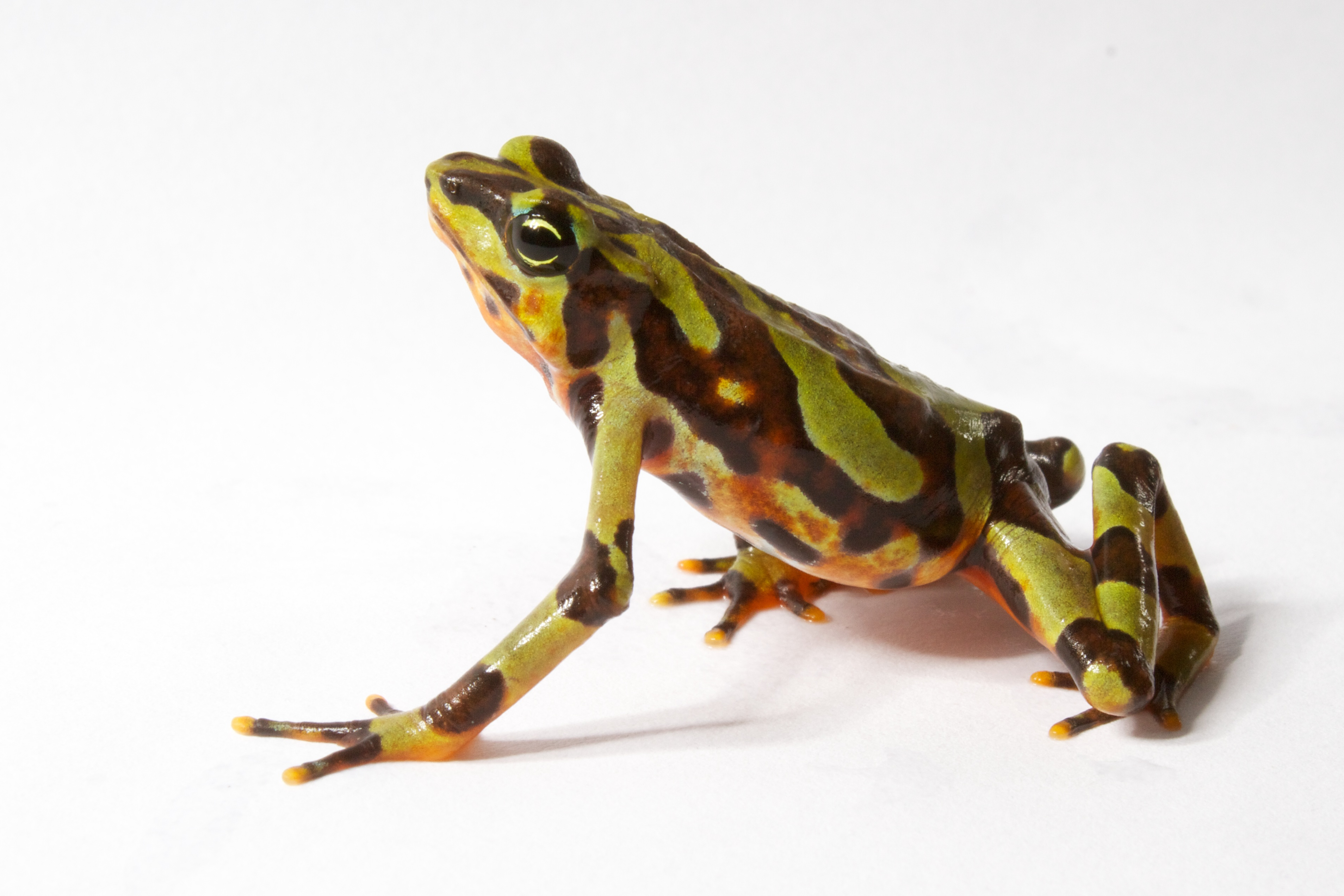
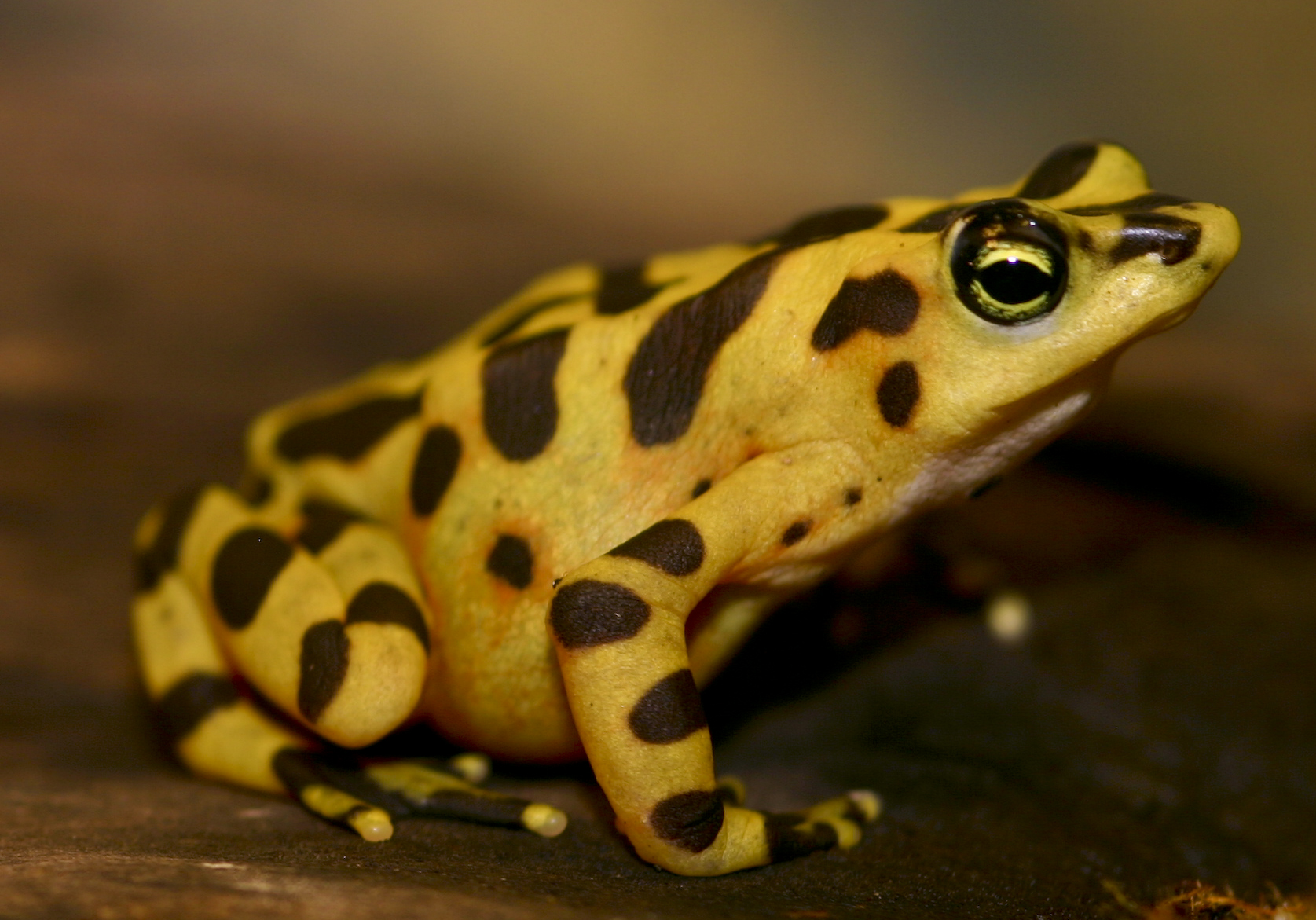
Image	Common name	Binomial name	Conservation status
	Andes stubfoot toad	Atelopus andinus Rivero, 1968	EN^{IUCN}
	Angelito stubfoot toad	Atelopus angelito Ardila-Robayo and Ruiz-Carranza, 1998	CR^{IUCN} (possibly extinct)
	Ardila's stubfoot toad	Atelopus ardila Coloma, Duellman, Almendariz, Ron, Teran-Valdez, and Guayasamin, 2010	CR^{IUCN} (possibly extinct)
	Starry night harlequin toad	Atelopus arsyecue Rueda-Almonacid, 1994	CR^{IUCN}
	Arthur's stubfoot toad	Atelopus arthuri Peters, 1973	CR^{IUCN}
	Rio Pescado stubfoot toad	Atelopus balios Peters, 1973	CR^{IUCN}
	Purple harlequin toad	Atelopus barbotini Lescure, 1981	LC^{IUCN}
	Azuay stubfoot toad	Atelopus bomolochos Peters, 1973	CR^{IUCN}
	Boulenger's stubfoot toad	Atelopus boulengeri Peracca, 1904	CR^{IUCN}
	Calima harlequin toad	Atelopus calima Velásquez Trujillo, Castro Herrera, Lötters & Plewnia, 2024	CR^{IUCN} (possibly extinct)
	Rio Carauta stubfoot toad	Atelopus carauta Ruiz-Carranza & Hernández-Camacho, 1978	DD^{IUCN}
	Venezuelan yellow frog or La Carbonera stubfoot toad	Atelopus carbonerensis Rivero, 1974	CR^{IUCN}
	Guajira stubfoot toad	Atelopus carrikeri Ruthven, 1916	EN^{IUCN}
	Darien stubfoot toad or Toad Mountain harlequin frog	Atelopus certus Barbour, 1923	CR^{IUCN}
	Chiriqui harlequin frog	†Atelopus chiriquiensis Shreve, 1936	EX^{IUCN}
		Atelopus chirripoensis Savage and Bolaños, 2009	DD^{IUCN}
	Chocó stubfoot toad	Atelopus chocoensis Lötters, 1992	CR^{IUCN} (possibly extinct)
		Atelopus chrysocorallus La Marca, 1996	CR^{IUCN}
		Atelopus colomai Plewnia, Terán-Valdez, Culebras, Boistel, Paluh, Quezada Riera, Heine, Reyes-Puig, Salazar-Valenzuela, Guayasamin & Lötters, 2024
	Rio Faisanes stubfoot toad	Atelopus coynei Miyata, 1980	CR^{IUCN}
	Veragua stubfoot toad	Atelopus cruciger (Lichtenstein & Martens, 1856)	CR^{IUCN}
		Atelopus dimorphus Lötters, 2003	DD^{IUCN}
	Huila stubfoot toad	Atelopus ebenoides Rivero, 1963 (possibly extinct)	CR^{IUCN} (possibly extinct)
	Elegant stubfoot toad	Atelopus elegans (Boulenger, 1882)	EN^{IUCN}
	Peruvian harlequin frog	Atelopus epikeisthos Lötters, Schulte & Duellman, 2005	EN^{IUCN}
	Carabaya stubfoot toad	Atelopus erythropus Boulenger, 1903	CR^{IUCN} (possibly extinct)
	Malvasa stubfoot toad	Atelopus eusebianus Rivero & Granados-Díaz, 1993	CR^{IUCN} (possibly extinct)
		Atelopus eusebiodiazi Venegas, Catenazzi, Siu-Ting & Carrillo, 2008	CR^{IUCN} (possibly extinct)
	Mazán jambato frog	Atelopus exiguus Boettger, 1892	EN^{IUCN}
		Atelopus famelicus Rivero & Morales, 1995	CR^{IUCN}
	Forest stubfoot toad	Atelopus farci Lynch, 1993	CR^{IUCN} (possibly extinct)
	Cayenne stubfoot toad	Atelopus flavescens Duméril & Bibron, 1841	VU^{IUCN}
	Central Coast stubfoot toad	Atelopus franciscus Lescure, 1974	LC^{IUCN}
	Border harlequin frog	Atelopus frontizero Veselý & Batista, 2021
	Antado stubfoot toad	Atelopus galactogaster Rivero & Serna, 1993	DD^{IUCN}
	Giant stubfoot toad	Atelopus gigas Coloma, Duellman, Almendáriz, Ron, Terán-Valdez, and Guayasamin, 2010	CR^{IUCN} (possibly extinct)
	Pirri Range harlequin frog	Atelopus glyphus Dunn, 1931	CR^{IUCN}
	Guanujo stubfoot toad	Atelopus guanujo Coloma, 2002	CR^{IUCN} (possibly extinct)
	La Guitarra stubfoot toad	Atelopus guitarraensis Osorno-Muñoz, Ardila-Robayo & Ruiz-Carranza, 2001	DD^{IUCN}
	Morona-Santiago stubfoot toad	Atelopus halihelos Peters, 1973	CR^{IUCN} (possibly extinct)
		Atelopus harlequin Coloma, Plewnia, Böning, Boistel, Ellwein, Lötters, Paluh, Roca-Rey Ross & Venegas, 2025
		Atelopus histrionicus Lötters, Plewnia, Böning, Boistel, Chaparro, Coloma, Ellwein, Orsen, Paluh & Venegas, 2025
	Hoogmoed harlequin toad	Atelopus hoogmoedi Lescure, 1974
	Quito stubfoot toad	Atelopus ignescens (Cornalia, 1849)	CR^{IUCN}
	San Lorenzo stubfoot toad	Atelopus laetissimus Ruiz-Carranza, Ardila-Robayo & Hernández-Camacho, 1994	EN^{IUCN}
	Limosa harlequin frog	Atelopus limosus Ibáñez, Jaramillo & Solís, 1995	CR^{IUCN}
		Atelopus loettersi De la Riva, Castroviejo-Fisher, Chaparro, Boistel, and Padial, 2011	NT^{IUCN}
	El Tambo stubfoot toad	Atelopus longibrachius Rivero, 1963	EN^{IUCN}
	Longnose stubfoot toad	Atelopus longirostris Cope, 1868	CR^{IUCN}
		Atelopus lozanoi Osorno-Muñoz, Ardila-Robayo & Ruiz-Carranza, 2001 (endangered)	EN^{IUCN}
	Lynch's stubfoot toad	Atelopus lynchi Cannatella, 1981	CR^{IUCN} (possibly extinct)
	Manaus harlequin frog	Atelopus manauensis Jorge, Ferrão & Lima, 2020
		Atelopus mandingues Osorno-Muñoz, Ardila-Robayo & Ruiz-Carranza, 2001	DD^{IUCN}
		Atelopus marinkellei Cochran and Goin, 1970	EN^{IUCN}
	Mindo stubfoot toad	Atelopus mindoensis Peters, 1973	CR^{IUCN}
	Colombian stubfoot toad	Atelopus minutulus Ruiz-Carranza, Hernández-Camacho & Ardila-Robayo, 1988	CR^{IUCN} (possibly extinct)
	Mittermeier's stubfoot toad	Atelopus mittermeieri Acosta-Galvis, Rueda-Almonacid, Velásquez-Álvarez, Sánchez-Pacheco & Peña Prieto, 2006	EN^{IUCN}
	Hernandez's stubfoot toad	Atelopus monohernandezii Ardila-Robayo, Osorno-Muñoz & Ruiz-Carranza, 2002	CR^{IUCN} (possibly extinct)
		Atelopus moropukaqumir Herrera-Alva, Díaz, Castillo, Rodolfo & Catenazzi, 2020
	Mucubaji stubfoot toad	Atelopus mucubajiensis Rivero, 1974	CR^{IUCN}
	La Arboleda stubfoot toad	Atelopus muisca Rueda-Almonacid & Hoyos, 1992	CR^{IUCN}
		Atelopus nahumae Ruiz-Carranza, Ardila-Robayo & Hernández-Camacho, 1994	EN^{IUCN}
	Sad harlequin frog	Atelopus nanay Coloma, 2002	CR^{IUCN}
	Gualecenita stubfoot toad	Atelopus nepiozomus Peters, 1973	EN^{IUCN}
	Niceforo's stubfoot toad	Atelopus nicefori Rivero, 1963	CR^{IUCN} (possibly extinct)
	Nocturnal harlequin toad	Atelopus nocturnus Bravo-Valencia and Rivera-Correa, 2011	CR^{IUCN}
		Atelopus onorei Coloma, Lötters, Duellman & Miranda-Leiva, 2007	CR^{IUCN} (possibly extinct)
		Atelopus orcesi Coloma, Duellman, Almendáriz, Ron, Terán-Valdez & Guayasamin, 2010	CR^{IUCN} (possibly extinct)
		Atelopus oxapampae Lehr, Lötters, and Lundberg, 2008	EN^{IUCN}
	Rednose stubfoot toad	Atelopus oxyrhynchus Boulenger, 1903	CR^{IUCN} (possibly extinct)
	Schmidt's stubfoot toad	Atelopus pachydermus (Schmidt, 1857)	CR^{IUCN} (possibly extinct)
	Andersson's stubfoot toad	Atelopus palmatus Andersson, 1945	CR^{IUCN}
	Pastuso harlequin frog	Atelopus pastuso Andersson, 1945	CR^{IUCN} (possibly extinct)
	Pataz stubfoot toad	Atelopus patazensis Venegas, Catenazzi, Siu-Ting & Carrillo, 2008	CR^{IUCN}
	San Isidro stubfoot toad	Atelopus pedimarmoratus Rivero, 1963	CR^{IUCN} (possibly extinct)
	Peru stubfoot toad	Atelopus peruensis Gray & Cannatella, 1985	CR^{IUCN} (possibly extinct)
	Peters' stubfoot toad	Atelopus petersi Coloma, Lötters, Duellman & Miranda-Leiva, 2007	CR^{IUCN} (possibly extinct)
	Painted stubfoot toad	Atelopus petriruizi Ardila-Robayo, 1999	CR^{IUCN} (possibly extinct)
		Atelopus pictiventris Kattan, 1986	CR^{IUCN} (possibly extinct)
	Pinango stubfoot toad	Atelopus pinangoi Rivero, 1982	CR^{IUCN} (possibly extinct)
	Napo stubfoot toad	Atelopus planispina Jiménez de la Espada, 1875	CR^{IUCN} (possibly extinct)
	Podocarpus stubfoot toad	Atelopus podocarpus Coloma, Duellman, Almendáriz, Ron, Terán-Valdez, and Guayasamin, 2010	CR^{IUCN}
	Río Huallaga stubfoot toad	Atelopus pulcher Boulenger, 1882	VU^{IUCN}
		Atelopus pyrodactylus Venegas & Barrio, 2006	CR^{IUCN}
	Quimbaya toad	Atelopus quimbaya Ruiz-Carranza & Osorno-Muñoz, 1994	CR^{IUCN} (possibly extinct)
		Atelopus reticulatus Lötters, Haas, Schick & Böhme, 2002	DD^{IUCN}
	Anori stubfoot toad	Atelopus sanjosei Rivero & Serna, 1989	CR^{IUCN}
	Upper Amazon stubfoot toad	Atelopus seminiferus Cope, 1874	EN^{IUCN}
	Pass stubfoot toad	†Atelopus senex Taylor, 1952	EX^{IUCN}
	Baldias harlequin toad	Atelopus sernai Ruiz-Carranza & Osorno-Muñoz, 1994	CR^{IUCN} (possibly extinct)
	Camouflaged harlequin toad	Atelopus simulatus Ruiz-Carranza & Osorno-Muñoz, 1994	CR^{IUCN} (possibly extinct)
		Atelopus siranus Lötters &Henzl, 2000	DD^{IUCN}
	Sonsón stubfoot toad	Atelopus sonsonensis Vélez-Rodriguez & Ruiz-Carranza, 1997	CR^{IUCN} (possibly extinct)
	Cloud forest stubfoot toad	Atelopus sorianoi La Marca, 1983	CR^{IUCN} (possibly extinct)
	Pebas stubfoot toad	Atelopus spumarius Cope, 1871	VU^{IUCN}
	Condoto stubfoot toad	Atelopus spurrelli Boulenger, 1914	NT^{IUCN}
	Bogota stubfoot toad	Atelopus subornatus Werner, 1899	CR^{IUCN}
	Venezuela stubfoot toad	Atelopus tamaensis La Marca, García-Pérez & Renjifo, 1990	CR^{IUCN}
	Three-colored stubfoot toad	Atelopus tricolor Boulenger, 1902	CR^{IUCN}
	Veragoa stubfoot toad	Atelopus varius (Lichtenstein & Martens, 1856)	CR^{IUCN}
	Maracay harlequin frog	†Atelopus vogli Müller, 1934	EX^{IUCN}
	Walker's stubfoot toad	Atelopus walkeri Rivero, 1963	DD^{IUCN}
	Panamanian golden frog	Atelopus zeteki Dunn, 1933	CR^{IUCN} (possibly extinct in the wild)
