= Atelopus eusebianus =

Malvasa stubfoot toad

Conservation status
- Critically endangered, possibly extinct (IUCN 3.1)

Scientific classification
- Kingdom: Animalia
- Phylum: Chordata
- Class: Amphibia
- Order: Anura
- Family: Bufonidae
- Genus: Atelopus
- Species: A. eusebianus

Binomial name
- Atelopus eusebianus Rivero & Granados, 1993

Species of amphibian

Atelopus eusebianus, the Malvasa stubfoot toad, is a species of toad in the family Bufonidae endemic to Colombia. Its natural habitats are subtropical or tropical thigh-altitude grassland and rivers. It is threatened by habitat loss.
