= Atelopus sanjosei =

Conservation status
- Critically Endangered (IUCN 3.1)

Scientific classification
- Kingdom: Animalia
- Phylum: Chordata
- Class: Amphibia
- Order: Anura
- Family: Bufonidae
- Genus: Atelopus
- Species: A. sanjosei

Binomial name
- Atelopus sanjosei Rivero & Serna, 1989

Species of amphibian

Atelopus sanjosei is a species of toad in the family Bufonidae endemic to Colombia. It is only known from its type locality in Anorí, Antioquia Department, on the Cordillera Occidental. Its natural habitats are tropical moist lowland forests near streams. It is threatened by habitat loss, water pollution by mining and development for mining; it is a lowland species. It is considered rare and has not been sighted since 1988.
