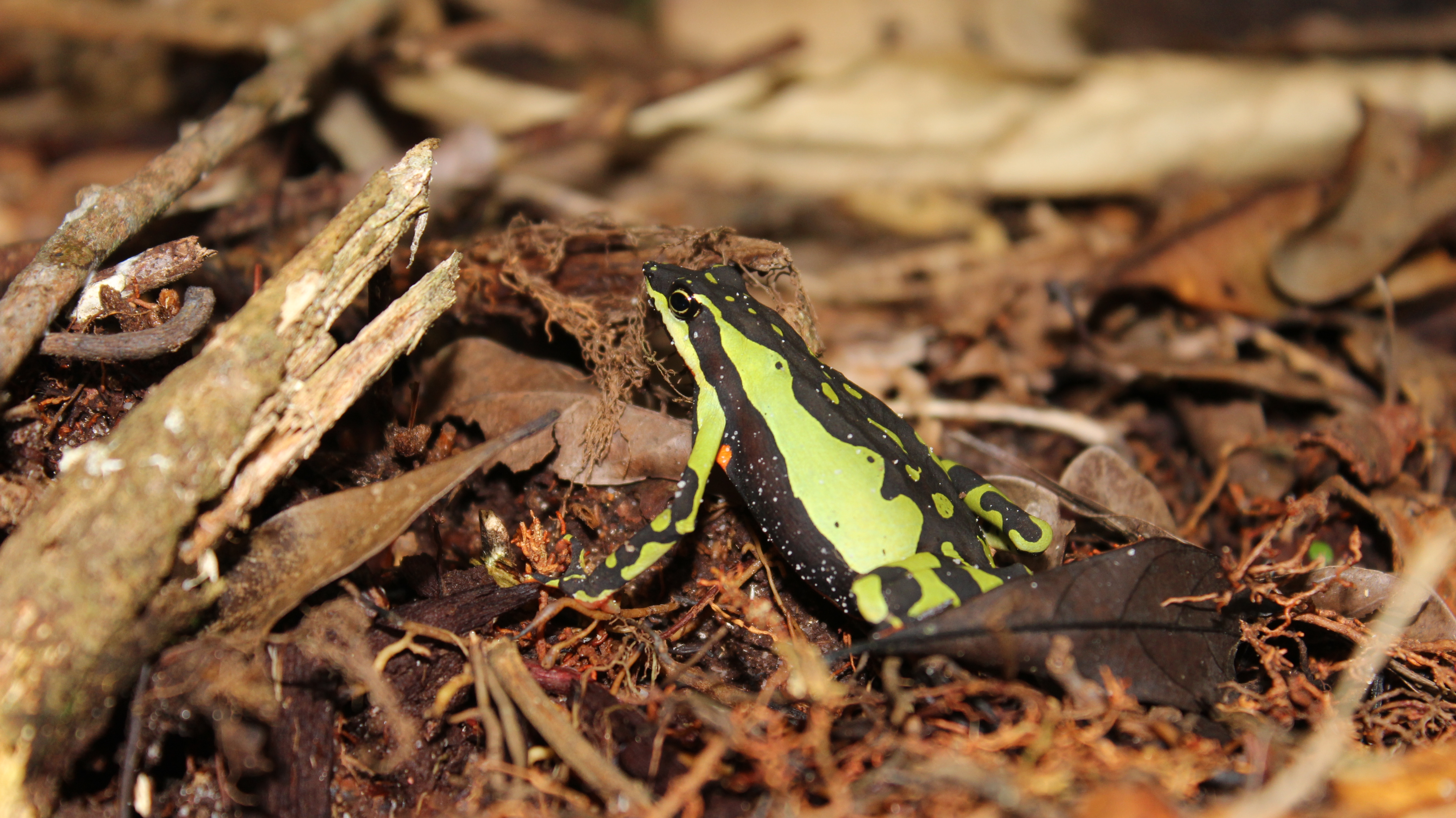
- In Tarapoto, Peru

Conservation status
- Vulnerable (IUCN 3.1)

Scientific classification
- Kingdom: Animalia
- Phylum: Chordata
- Class: Amphibia
- Order: Anura
- Family: Bufonidae
- Genus: Atelopus
- Species: A. pulcher

Binomial name
- Atelopus pulcher Boulenger, 1882

= Atelopus pulcher =

Species of amphibian

Atelopus pulcher, the Río Huallaga Stubfoot Toad, is a species of toad in the family Bufonidae. It is endemic to eastern Peru where it is found in the Huallaga River drainage; its range might extend to Ecuador. Its natural habitats are lowland and premontane tropical forests. It is a diurnal and terrestrial species that breeds in streams.

== Description ==
Atelopus pulcher measures about 35 mm (1.4 in) in snout–vent length. It has a slender body with quite smooth skin. It is blackish brown above, with various light green markings.

Breeding might occur throughout the year. The tadpoles grow to about 6 mm (0.24 in) in body length and 14 mm (0.55 in) in total length. The tadpole is dorso-ventrally flattened and has a large ventral suction disc behind its mouth. It is similar to other Atelopus tadpoles except that its upper beak is shorter than the lower one.

== Conservation ==
Atelopus pulcher is threatened by chytridiomycosis and habitat loss. It is relatively rare species that is declining in abundance and has disappeared from many known localities. It is sometimes collected for the pet trade, and this might contribute to local declines.

== Gallery ==
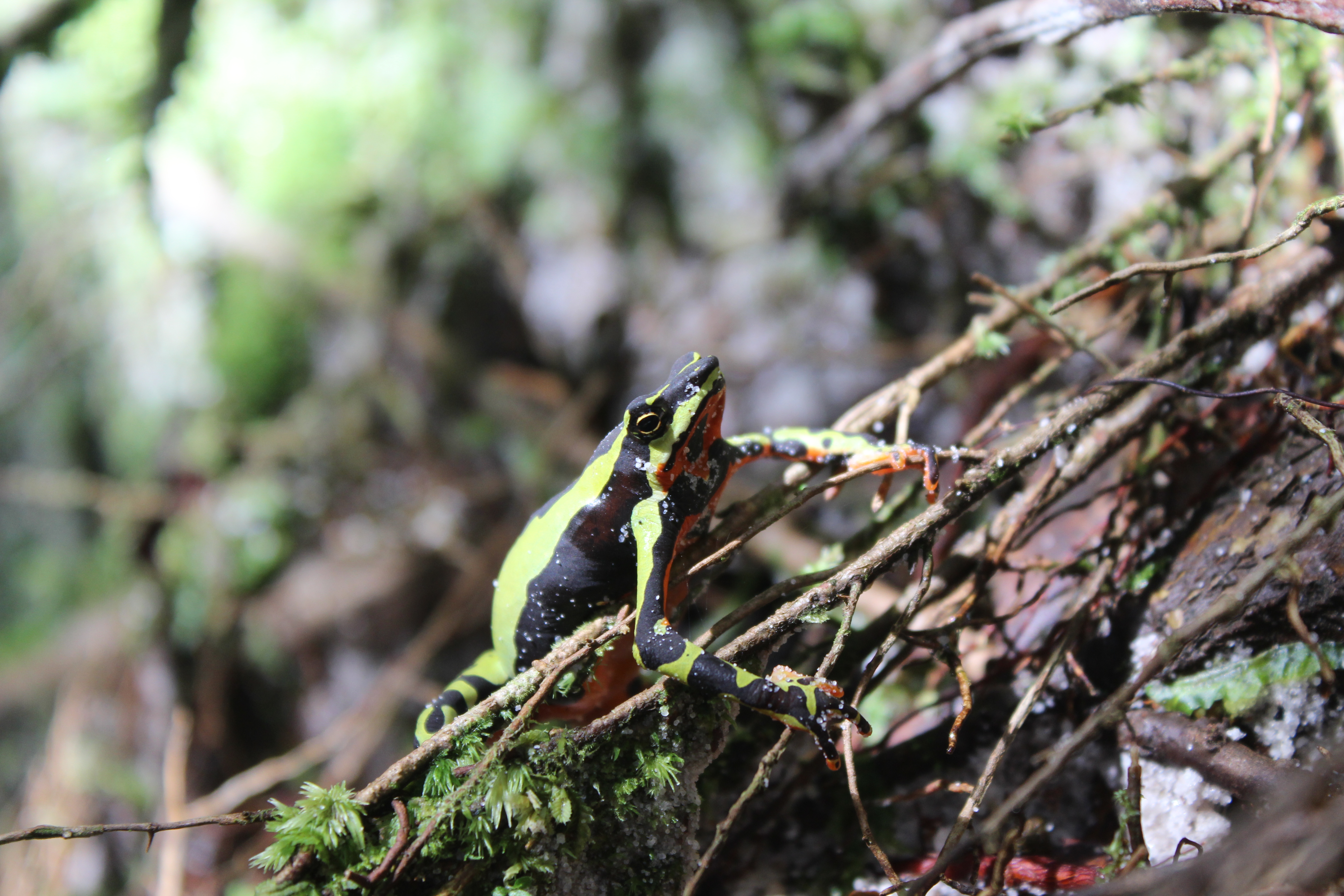
Atelopus pulcher, Tarapoto, Peru

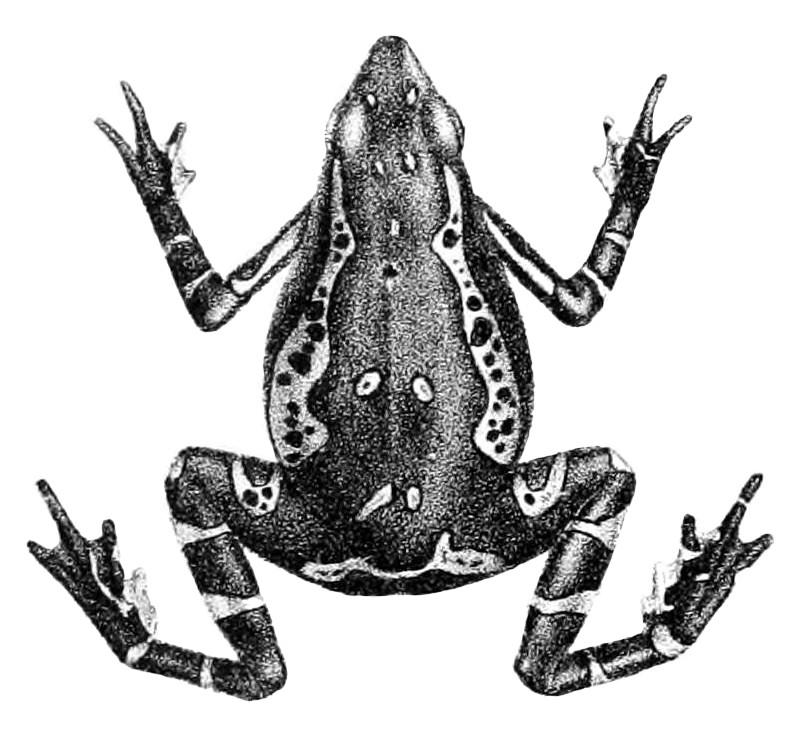
Illustration by Robert Mintern.
