= Atelopus mittermeieri =

Conservation status
- Endangered (IUCN 3.1)

Scientific classification
- Kingdom: Animalia
- Phylum: Chordata
- Class: Amphibia
- Order: Anura
- Family: Bufonidae
- Genus: Atelopus
- Species: A. mittermeieri

Binomial name
- Atelopus mittermeieri Acosta-Galvis, Rueda-Almonacid, Velásquez-Álvarez, Sánchez-Pacheco & Peña Prieto, 2006

Species of amphibian

Atelopus mittermeieri is a species of toad in the family Bufonidae. It is endemic to Colombia.
