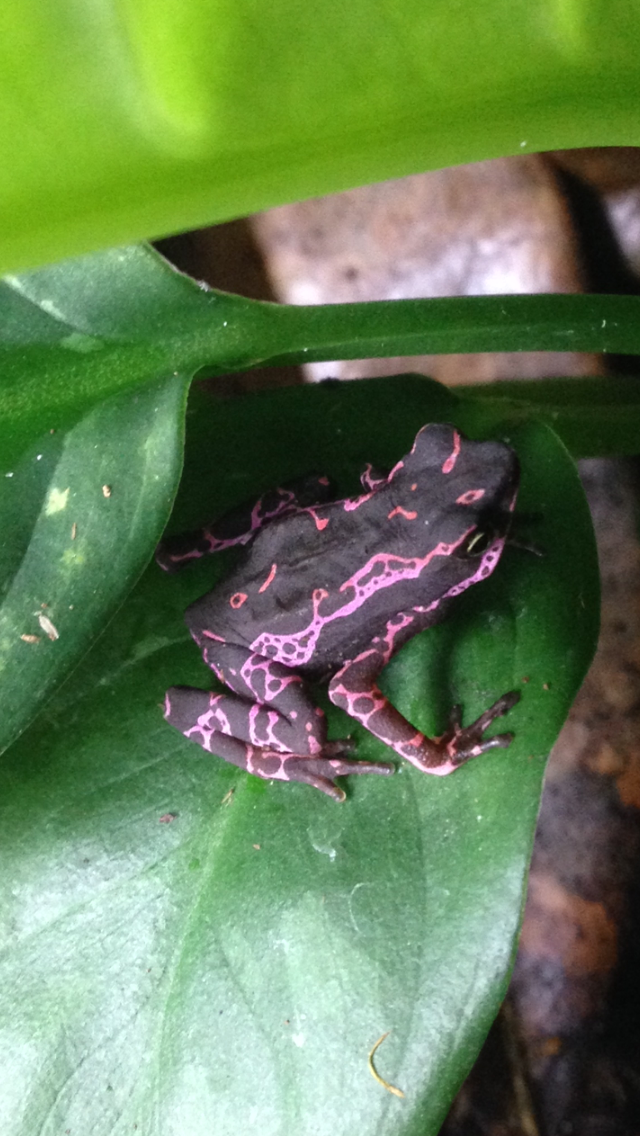

Conservation status
- Least Concern (IUCN 3.1)

Scientific classification
- Kingdom: Animalia
- Phylum: Chordata
- Class: Amphibia
- Order: Anura
- Family: Bufonidae
- Genus: Atelopus
- Species: A. barbotini

Binomial name
- Atelopus barbotini Lescure, 1981

Synonyms
- Atelopus spumarius barbotini Lescure, 1981

= Atelopus barbotini =

Species of amphibian

Atelopus barbotini, popularly known as the purple fluorescent frog or more accurately the purple harlequin toad, is a species of toad in the family Bufonidae.

== General Information ==
The toad was formerly considered part of the Atelopus spumarius. It is not clear whether or not it is a single species or a group of related species. In the past the species has also been called Atelopus flavescens.

Several publications have touched on the subject of Atelopus barbotini. In 2005 Noonan and Gaucher wrote in Molecular Ecology that there was evidence that Atelopus barbotini might not be conspecific with Atelopus spumarius. They didn't make a change to the taxology of the species though. In 2011 Lötters, van der Meijden, et al. argued that Atelopus barbotini and Atelopus spumarius were not conspecific, but that Atelopus flavescens may be conspecific with Atelopus barbotini.

== Size ==
Atelopus barbotini are a smaller species of toad only reaching approximately 2.5cm for males and 3.5cm for females as adults.

== Range ==
It is endemic to the uplands of central French Guiana.

== Reasons for Decline in Population ==
Deforestation and disease are the main causes for population decline in recent years. Because French Guiana has few laws and restrictions for logging, there are often issues with sustaining enough range for the toads to maintain a steady population.
