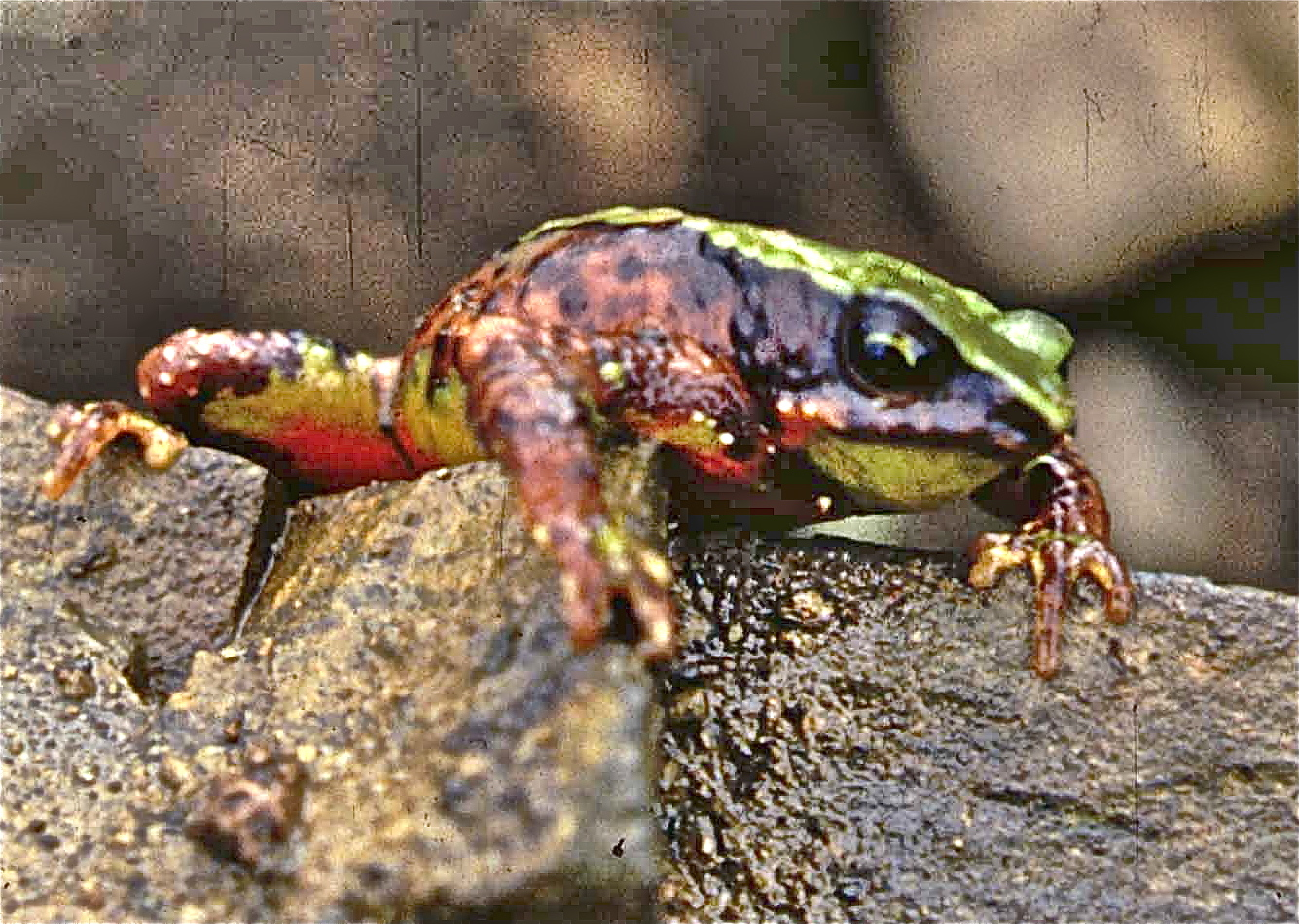
- A. arthuri in Ecuador

Conservation status
- Critically Endangered (IUCN 3.1)

Scientific classification
- Kingdom: Animalia
- Phylum: Chordata
- Class: Amphibia
- Order: Anura
- Family: Bufonidae
- Genus: Atelopus
- Species: A. arthuri

Binomial name
- Atelopus arthuri Peters, 1973

= Atelopus arthuri =

Species of amphibian

Atelopus arthuri, Arthur's stubfoot toad, is a species of toad in the family Bufonidae endemic to Ecuador. Its natural habitats are subtropical or tropical moist montane forests, subtropical or tropical high-altitude grasslands, and rivers. It is threatened by habitat loss. It has not been seen since the nineteen eighties and is considered probably extinct.
