= Atelopus pyrodactylus =

Conservation status
- Critically Endangered (IUCN 3.1)

Scientific classification
- Kingdom: Animalia
- Phylum: Chordata
- Class: Amphibia
- Order: Anura
- Family: Bufonidae
- Genus: Atelopus
- Species: A. pyrodactylus

Binomial name
- Atelopus pyrodactylus Venegas and Barrio, 2006
- Atelopus pyrodactylus is only known from the eastern slope of the Cordillera Central, Peru

Species of amphibian

Atelopus pyrodactylus is a species of toad in the family Bufonidae. It is endemic to Peru and only known from its type locality in the northern section of the Río Huallaga basin, Department of San Martín, on the eastern slope of the Cordillera Central (Peruvian Andes). The specific name pyrodactylus refers to the light orange fingers and toes of this frog.

== Description ==
The holotype, an adult male, is a slender-bodied frog measuring 38 mm (1.5 in) in snout–vent length. The head is longer than it is wide. The snout is acuminate. No tympanum is visible. The fingers are unwebbed while the toes are partially webbed. Dorsal surfaces have scattered rounded warts, but the scapular region as well as the limbs, hand, and foot are densely warted. Dorsal coloration is green with some tan vermiculation. The dorsal surfaces of limbs are green with yellow tubercles and pale orange and tan spots. The throat, chest, and belly are orange with black long vermiculation. The ventral surfaces of limbs are black with oblong orange blotches, while the palmar and plantar surfaces are orange with green flecks.

== Habitat and conservation ==
The type locality is a ridge with evergreen montane forest at 2,860 m (9,380 ft) above sea level. The holotype was found at the edge of a trail, hidden beneath a mud trail-cut-wall. As other Atelopus, this species probably has tadpoles that develop in running water.

Atelopus pyrodactylus is only known from two specimens, the holotype collected in 2003 and a dead female found in 2006 from the same locality. Searches in 2008 were unsuccessful. The area of the type locality is under high human pressure and suffers from habitat loss (clearing of land for agriculture). Also chytridiomycosis is likely to be a threat. Atelopus pyrodactylus is not known to occur in any protected area but is legally protected in Peru.
