= Atelopus reticulatus =

Conservation status
- Data Deficient (IUCN 3.1)

Scientific classification
- Kingdom: Animalia
- Phylum: Chordata
- Class: Amphibia
- Order: Anura
- Family: Bufonidae
- Genus: Atelopus
- Species: A. reticulatus

Binomial name
- Atelopus reticulatus Lötters, Haas, Schick & Böhme, 2002

Species of amphibian

Atelopus reticulatus is a species of toads in the family Bufonidae.

It is endemic to Peru. Its natural habitats are subtropical or tropical moist montane forests and rivers. It is threatened by habitat loss.
