= Atelopus epikeisthos =

Conservation status
- Endangered (IUCN 3.1)

Scientific classification
- Kingdom: Animalia
- Phylum: Chordata
- Class: Amphibia
- Order: Anura
- Family: Bufonidae
- Genus: Atelopus
- Species: A. epikeisthos

Binomial name
- Atelopus epikeisthos Lötters, Schulte & Duellman, 2005

Species of amphibian

Atelopus epikeisthos, the Peruvian harlequin frog, is a species of toads in the family Bufonidae. It is endemic to Peru.
