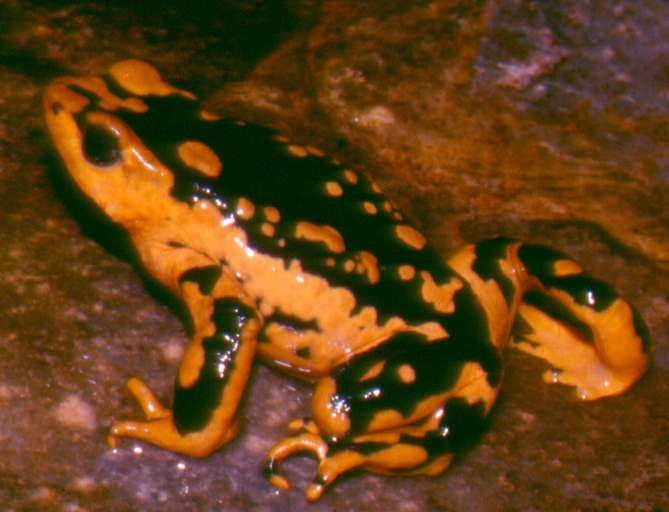

Conservation status
- Critically Endangered (IUCN 3.1)

Scientific classification
- Kingdom: Animalia
- Phylum: Chordata
- Class: Amphibia
- Order: Anura
- Family: Bufonidae
- Genus: Atelopus
- Species: A. patazensis

Binomial name
- Atelopus patazensis Venegas, Catenazzi, Siu-Ting and Carrillo, 2008

= Atelopus patazensis =

Species of amphibian

Atelopus patazensis is a species of toads in the family Bufonidae. It is endemic to Peru and only known from its type locality in Quebrada Los Alisos, near Pataz in the La Libertad Region. There is, however, an unverified observation from Llacuabamba, about 40 km south of Pataz.

== Description ==
Atelopus patazensis is a relatively large Atelopus: adult males measure 35–40 mm (1.4–1.6 in) and females 43–49 mm (1.7–1.9 in) in snout–vent length. The head is about as long as it is wide. There is no tympanum. The body is robust with relatively short limbs. The fingers are unwebbed whereas the toes have some webbing. The dorsum is orange with larger black vermiculated or irregular marks that extend to the limbs, or black with orange vermiculated or irregular marks. The venter is immaculate orange, as are the palms and soles.

== Habitat and conservation ==
Atelopus patazensis lives in montane environments at elevations of 2,500–3,000 m (8,200–9,800 ft) above sea level dominated by bunchgrass and scattered shrubs. Breeding takes place in streams.

Adults were regularly observed at the type locality until 1999, when chytrid fungus was detected, along with dead specimens. Later surveys have managed to locate only very few adults or tadpoles. In addition to chytridiomycosis, also pollution from mining activities as well as domestic waste are threats to this species.
