= Atelopus erythropus =

Conservation status
- Critically endangered, possibly extinct (IUCN 3.1)

Scientific classification
- Kingdom: Animalia
- Phylum: Chordata
- Class: Amphibia
- Order: Anura
- Family: Bufonidae
- Genus: Atelopus
- Species: A. erythropus

Binomial name
- Atelopus erythropus Boulenger, 1903

Species of amphibian

Atelopus erythropus, the Carabaya stubfoot toad, is a species of toad in the family Bufonidae endemic to Peru. Its natural habitats are subtropical or tropical moist montane forests and rivers.
