= List of critically endangered amphibians =

- Extinct in the wild (EW): 2 species
- Critically endangered (CR): 825 species
- Endangered (EN): 1,291 species
- Vulnerable (VU): 815 species
- Near threatened (NT): 453 species
- Least concern (LC): 3,733 species
- Data deficient (DD): 896 species
Amphibian species (IUCN, 2025-2)
- 8052 extant species have been evaluated
- 7156 of those are fully assessed (Note: excludes data deficient evaluations.)
- 4186 are not threatened at present (Note: NT and LC.)
- 2931 to 3827 are threatened (Note: Threatened comprises CR, EN and VU. Upper estimate additionally includes DD.)
- 35 to 148 are extinct or extinct in the wild:
  - 37 extinct (EX) species (Note: Chart omits extinct (EX) species)
  - 2 extinct in the wild (EW)

Critically endangered (CR) species face an extremely high risk of extinction in the wild.

As of December 2025, the International Union for Conservation of Nature (IUCN) lists 825 critically endangered amphibian species, including 187 which are tagged as possibly extinct. 10.2% of all evaluated amphibian species are listed as critically endangered.

Additionally, 896 amphibian species (11.1% of those evaluated) are listed as data deficient, meaning there is insufficient information for a full assessment of conservation status. As these species typically have small distributions and/or populations, they are intrinsically likely to be threatened, according to the IUCN. While the category of data deficient indicates that no assessment of extinction risk has been made for the taxa, the IUCN notes that it may be appropriate to give them "the same degree of attention as threatened taxa, at least until their status can be assessed."

This is a complete list of critically endangered amphibian species evaluated by the IUCN, last substantially updated January 2022. Species considered possibly extinct by the IUCN are marked as such.

== Caudata ==
Salamanders

=== Cryptobranchidae ===
Giant salamanders

- Chinese giant salamander (Andrias davidianus)
- South China giant salamander (Andrias sligoi)

=== Hynobiidae ===
Asiatic salamanders

- Hynobius amakusaensis
- Nanhu salamander (Hynobius glacialis)
- Hynobius guabangshanensis
- Hynobius maoershanensis
- Hynobius mikawaensis
- Hynobius tosashimizuensis
- Tsukuba clawed salamander (Onychodactylus tsukubaensis)
- Kuankuoshui salamander (Pseudohynobius kuankuoshuiensis)
- Puxiong salamander (Pseudohynobius puxiongensis)
- Shuicheng salamander (Pseudohynobius shuichengensis)

=== Salamandridae ===
True salamanders and newts

- Montseny brook newt (Calotriton arnoldi)
- Chinhai spiny newt (Echinotriton chinhaiensis)
- Mountain spiny newt (Echinotriton maxiquadratus)
- Hypselotriton chenggongensis
- Fuding fire-bellied newt (Hypselotriton fudingensis)
- Blue-gray fire-bellied newt (Hypselotriton glaucus)
- Pachytriton airobranchiatus
- Pachytriton xanthospilos
- Spotless smooth warty newt (Paramesotriton labiatus)
- Lanza's alpine salamander (Salamandra lanzai)
- Anhui knobby newt (Tylototriton anhuiensis)
- Mangshan crocodile newt (Tylototriton lizhenchangi)

=== Ambystomatidae ===
Mole salamanders

- Blunt-headed salamander (Ambystoma amblycephalum)
- Anderson's salamander (Ambystoma andersoni)
- Lake Patzcuaro salamander (Ambystoma dumerilii)
- Leora's stream salamander (Ambystoma leorae)
- Axolotl (Ambystoma mexicanum)
- Taylor's salamander (Ambystoma taylori)

=== Plethodontidae ===
Lungless salamanders

- Hickory Nut Gorge green salamander (Aneides caryaensis)
- Admirable false brook salamander (Aquiloeurycea praecellens) (possibly extinct)
- Cuetzalan salamander (Aquiloeurycea quetzalanensis)
- Relictual slender salamander (Batrachoseps relictus)
- Orphan salamander (Bolitoglossa capitana)
- Cloud forest salamander (Bolitoglossa carri)
- Bolitoglossa cataguana
- Celaque mushroomtongue salamander (Bolitoglossa celaque)
- Bolitoglossa centenorum
- Hotel Zacaray salmander (Bolitoglossa chica)
- Chucanti salamander (Bolitoglossa chucantiensis)
- El Copé giant salamander (Bolitoglossa copia)
- Monte Escondido salamander (Bolitoglossa decora)
- Bolitoglossa huehuetenanguensis
- Bolitoglossa insularis
- Jackson's mushroomtongue salamander (Bolitoglossa jacksoni)
- Leandra salamander (Bolitoglossa leandrae)
- Longest climbing salamander (Bolitoglossa longissima)
- Bolitoglossa ninadormida
- Bolitoglossa nussbaumi (possibly extinct)
- Zarciadero web-footed salamander (Bolitoglossa oresbia)
- Bolitoglossa suchitanensis
- Cerro Pital salamander (Bolitoglossa synoria)
- Bolitoglossa tzultacaj
- Arboreal splayfoot salamander (Chiropterotriton arboreus)
- Atzalan golden salamander (Chiropterotriton aureus)
- Tlapacoyan salamander (Chiropterotriton casasi) (possibly extinct)
- Ceron family salamander (Chiropterotriton ceronorum)
- Common splayfoot salamander (Chiropterotriton chiropterus)
- Pygmy splayfoot salamander (Chiropterotriton lavae)
- Cave splayfoot salamander (Chiropterotriton mosaueri)
- Chiropterotriton nubilus
- Valle Alegre salamander (Chiropterotriton perotensis)
- Terrestrial splayfoot salamander (Chiropterotriton terrestris)
- Cruz Blanca salamander (Chiropterotriton totonacus)
- Monzon's hidden salamander (Cryptotriton monzoni)
- Cataguana hidden salamander (Cryptotriton necopinus)
- Sierra de las Minas hidden salamander (Cryptotriton sierraminensis)
- Baja Verapaz salamander (Cryptotriton veraepacis)
- Sierra de Xucaneb hidden salamander (Cryptotriton xucaneborum)
- Volcan Tajumulco bromeliad salamander (Dendrotriton bromeliacius)
- Dendrotriton chujorum
- Forest bromeliad salamander (Dendrotriton cuchumatanus)
- Dendrotriton kekchiorum
- Guatemalan bromeliad salamander (Dendrotriton rabbi)
- Dendrotriton sanctibarbarus
- San Marcos salamander (Eurycea nana)
- Georgetown salamander (Eurycea naufragia)
- Texas blind salamander (Eurycea rathbuni)
- Austin blind salamander (Eurycea waterlooensis)
- West Virginia spring salamader (Gyrinophilus subterraneus)
- Corrugated salamander (Isthmura corrugata)
- Cofre de Perote salamander (Isthmura naucampatepetl)
- Dwarf false brook salamander (Ixalotriton parvus)
- Nototriton mime
- Texiguat moss salamander (Nototriton nelsoni)
- Pico Bonito moss salamander (Nototriton oreadorum)
- Nototriton picucha
- Nototriton saslaya
- Stuart's moss salamander (Nototriton stuarti)
- Nototriton tomamorum
- Chorti worm salamander (Oedipina chortiorum)
- La Fortuna worm salamander (Oedipina gephyra)
- Maritime worm salamander (Oedipina maritima)
- Oedipina petiola (possibly extinct)
- Oedipina tomasi
- Shenandoah salamander (Plethodon shenandoah)
- Imperial salamander (Pseudoeurycea ahuitzotl)
- Anita's false brook salamander (Pseudoeurycea anitae) (possibly extinct)
- Aquatic salamander (Pseudoeurycea aquatica) (possibly extinct)
- Peña Verde salamander (Pseudoeurycea aurantia)
- Brown false brook salamander (Pseudoeurycea brunnata) (possibly extinct)
- Goebel's false brook salamander (Pseudoeurycea goebeli)
- Adler's mountain salamander (Pseudoeurycea kuautli)
- Brown-streaked salamander (Pseudoeurycea mixcoatl)
- Ridge tail salamander (Pseudoeurycea obesa)
- Roberts' false brook salamander (Pseudoeurycea robertsi)
- Leaping false brook salamander (Pseudoeurycea saltator)
- Smith's false brook salamander (Pseudoeurycea smithi)
- Bearded salamander (Pseudoeurycea tenchalli)
- Teotepec salamander (Pseudoeurycea teotepec) (possibly extinct)
- Green-flecked salamander (Pseudoeurycea tlahcuiloh)
- Claw-toothed salamander (Pseudoeurycea unguidentis) (possibly extinct)
- Spezia cave salamander (Speleomantes ambrosii)
- Sette Fratelli cave salamander (Speleomantes sarrabusensis)
- Arboreal thorius (Thorius arboreus)
- Golden thorius (Thorius aureus)
- Acultzingo pygmy salamander (Thorius dubitus)
- Grand minute salamander (Thorius grandis)
- Atoyac minute salamander (Thorius infernalis)
- Surprise thorius (Thorius insperatus)
- Long-tailed minute salamander (Thorius longicaudus) (possibly extinct)
- Crescent-nostriled thorius (Thorius lunaris)
- Big-footed thorius (Thorius magnipes)
- Oaxacan pygmy salamander (Thorius minutissimus)
- McDiarmid thorius (Thorius munificus)
- San Martin pygmy salamander (Thorius narismagnus)
- Papalo minute salamander (Thorius papaloae)
- Lower Cerro pygmy salamander (Thorius pulmonaris)
- Schmidt's pygmy salamander (Thorius schmidti)
- Smith's thorius (Thorius smithi)
- Spotted thorius (Thorius spilogaster)

== Anura ==
Frogs

=== Leiopelmatidae ===
New Zealand primitive frogs

- Archey's frog (Leiopelma archeyi)

=== Alytidae ===
Midwife toads, painted frogs

- Hula painted frog (Latonia nigriventer)

=== Pipidae ===
Clawed frogs, Surinam toads

- Lendu Plateau clawed frog (Xenopus lenduensis)
- Lake Oku clawed frog (Xenopus longipes)

=== Megophryidae ===
Litter frogs

- Bidoup litter toad (Leptobrachella bidoupensis)
- Botsford's leaf-litter frog (Leptobrachella botsfordi)
- Leptobrachella kecil
- Khasi slender-armed frog (Leptobrachella khasiorum)
- Nagaland Asian toad (Leptobrachella lateralis)
- Leptobrachella palmata
- Rowley's litter toad (Leptobrachella rowleyae)
- Leptobrachium kantonishikawai
- Fengkai's horned toad (Megophrys acuta)
- Megophrys baolongensis
- Nan'ao Island horned toad (Megophrys insularis)
- Heishiding's horned toad (Megophrys obesa)
- Garo white-lipped horned frog (Megophrys oreocrypta)
- Sangzhi horned toad (Megophrys sangzhiensis)
- Oreolalax liangbeiensis
- Piebald alpine toad (Scutiger maculatus) (possibly extinct)
- Spiny lazy toad (Scutiger spinosus)
- Xenophrys damrei
- Dzükou Valley horned frog (Xenophrys dzukou)

=== Sooglossidae ===
Seychelles frogs

- Seychelles palm frog (Sechellophryne pipilodryas)
- Thomasset's Seychelles frog (Sooglossus thomasseti)

=== Nasikabatrachidae ===
Purple frogs

- Nasikabatrachus bhupathi

=== Myobatrachidae ===
Australian water frogs

- White-bellied frog (Anstisia alba)
- Mount Wollumbin hip-pocket frog (Assa wollumbin)
- Corroboree frog (Pseudophryne corroboree)
- Northern Corroboree frog (Pseudophryne pengilleyi)
- Kroombit tinker frog (Taudactylus pleione)
- Northern tinker frog (Taudactylus rheophilus)

=== Limnodynastidae ===
Australian ground frogs

- Baw Baw frog (Philoria frosti)

=== Brachycephalidae ===
Saddleback toads and allies

- Brachycephalus boticario
- Brachycephalus bufonoides
- Brachycephalus fuscolineatus
- Brachycephalus mariaeterezae
- Brachycephalus mirissimus
- Brachycephalus pernix
- Brachycephalus quiririensis
- Ischnocnema concolor
- Ischnocnema garciai
- Santa Teresa robber frog (Ischnocnema epipeda)
- Ischnocnema karst
- Ischnocnema melanopygia

=== Eleutherodactylidae ===
Robber frogs

- Adelophryne maranguapensis
- Michelin flea frog (Adelophryne michelin)
- Fiery dink frog (Diasporus igneus)
- Diasporus majeensis
- Diasporus pequeno
- Diasporus sapo
- Cuban red-rumped frog (Eleutherodactylus acmonis)
- Turquino white-footed frog (Eleutherodactylus albipes)
- Jamaican peak frog (Eleutherodactylus alticola)
- Haitian robber frog (Eleutherodactylus amadeus)
- Tiburon burrowing frog (Eleutherodactylus aporostegus)
- La Hotte big-legged frog (Eleutherodactylus apostates)
- La Hotte bush frog (Eleutherodactylus bakeri)
- Barton's robber frog (Eleutherodactylus bartonsmithi)
- Pinelands grassfrog (Eleutherodactylus beguei)
- Canasi frog (Eleutherodactylus blairhedgesi)
- Cordillera central frog (Eleutherodactylus bothroboans)
- Maisi frog (Eleutherodactylus bresslerae)
- Short-nosed green frog (Eleutherodactylus brevirostris)
- Haitian marshfrog (Eleutherodactylus caribe)
- Portland Ridge frog (Eleutherodactylus cavernicola)
- False green robber frog (Eleutherodactylus chlorophenax)
- Hispaniolan crowned frog (Eleutherodactylus corona)
- La Selle long-legged frog (Eleutherodactylus darlingtoni)
- Patternless whistling frog (Eleutherodactylus diplasius)
- Haitian ventriloquial frog (Eleutherodactylus dolomedes)
- Eneida's coquí (Eleutherodactylus eneidae) (possibly extinct)
- La Hotte whistling frog (Eleutherodactylus eunaster)
- Khaki bromeliad frog (Eleutherodactylus fowleri)
- La Selle red-legged frog (Eleutherodactylus furcyensis)
- La Hotte glanded frog (Eleutherodactylus glandulifer)
- La Selle grassfrog (Eleutherodactylus glanduliferoides) (possibly extinct)
- Cricket coqui (Eleutherodactylus gryllus)
- Jamaican bromeliad frog (Eleutherodactylus jamaicensis)
- Golden coquí (Eleutherodactylus jasperi) (possibly extinct)
- Orange long-nosed frog (Eleutherodactylus jaumei)
- Plains coqui (Eleutherodactylus juanariveroi)
- La Selle dusky frog (Eleutherodactylus jugans)
- Rock pocket frog (Eleutherodactylus junori)
- Web-footed coquí (Eleutherodactylus karlschmidti) (possibly extinct)
- Castillon robber frog (Eleutherodactylus lamprotes)
- Oriente yellow-bellied frog (Eleutherodactylus leberi)
- Baoruco rockfrog (Eleutherodactylus ligiae)
- Haitian streamside frog (Eleutherodactylus limbensis)
- Pallid rockfrog (Eleutherodactylus lucioi)
- Sierra Manatlán trilling frog (Eleutherodactylus manantlanensis)
- Cuban butterfly-marked frog (Eleutherodactylus mariposa)
- Sierra Maestra blotched frog (Eleutherodactylus michaelschmidi)
- Spiny giant frog (Eleutherodactylus nortoni)
- Arntully robber frog (Eleutherodactylus orcutti) (possibly extinct)
- Baracoa dwarf frog (Eleutherodactylus orientalis)
- Hispaniolan sharp-nosed frog (Eleutherodactylus oxyrhyncus)
- Macaya burrowing frog (Eleutherodactylus parapelates)
- Hispaniolan pink-rumped frog (Eleutherodactylus paulsoni)
- Citadel frog (Eleutherodactylus poolei)
- Port-de-Paix frog (Eleutherodactylus rhodesi)
- Short-legged streamside frog (Eleutherodactylus rivularis)
- Rucilla streamside frog (Eleutherodactylus rucillensis)
- Hispaniolan streamside frog (Eleutherodactylus schmidti) (possibly extinct)
- La Hotte striped-legged frog (Eleutherodactylus sciagraphus)
- Tiburon streamfrog (Eleutherodactylus semipalmatus) (possibly extinct)
- Leaf mimic frog (Eleutherodactylus sisyphodemus)
- Western spiny frog (Eleutherodactylus symingtoni)
- Macaya breast-spotted frog (Eleutherodactylus thorectes)
- Turquino streamfrog (Eleutherodactylus turquinensis)
- Dwarf coqui (Eleutherodactylus unicolor)
- Macaya dusky frog (Eleutherodactylus ventrilineatus)
- Tortue frog (Eleutherodactylus warreni)

=== Craugastoridae ===
Fleshbelly frogs

- Sonson frog (Atopophrynus syntomopus)
- Craugastor adamastus (possibly extinct)
- Atlantic robber frog (Craugastor andi)
- Angel robber frog (Craugastor angelicus)
- Craugastor campbelli
- Craugastor castanedai
- Craugastor catalinae
- Mccranie's robber frog (Craugastor chrysozetetes) (possibly extinct)
- Coffee rain frog (Craugastor coffeus)
- Cruz robber frog (Craugastor cruzi) (possibly extinct)
- Rio Claro robber frog (Craugastor emcelae)
- Craugastor epochthidius
- Heredia robber frog (Craugastor escoces)
- Vanishing rainfrog (Craugastor evanesco)
- Nombre de Dios streamside frog (Craugastor fecundus) (possibly extinct)
- Fleischmann's robber frog (Craugastor fleischmanni)
- Craugastor gulosus
- Craugastor inachus
- San Pedro robber frog (Craugastor merendonensis)
- Miles' robber frog (Craugastor milesi)
- Craugastor nefrens
- Craugastor obesus
- Craugastor olanchano (possibly extinct)
- Ghost flesh-bellied frog (Craugastor phasma) (possibly extinct)
- Poza Turipache rainfrog (Craugastor pozo)
- Bob's robber frog (Craugastor punctariolus)
- Craugastor ranoides
- Craugastor rhyacobatrachus (possibly extinct)
- Craugastor saltuarius
- Craugastor stadelmani
- Tabasara rainfrog (Craugastor tabasarae)
- Taylor's robber frog (Craugastor taylori)
- Craugastor trachydermus (possibly extinct)

=== Strabomantidae ===
Cloud forest landfrogs

- Euparkerella cryptica
- Izecksohn's Guanabara frog (Euparkerella robusta)
- Itatiaia highland frog (Holoaden bradei) (possibly extinct)
- Microkayla ankohuma
- Microkayla boettgei
- Microkayla guillei
- Microkayla harveyi
- Microkayla kallawaya
- Microkayla pinguis
- Microkayla saltator
- Microkayla teqta
- Bagrecito Andes frog (Noblella bagrecito)
- Noblella madreselva
- Oreobates zongoensis
- Phrynopus heimorum
- Junin Andes frog (Phrynopus juninensis)
- Peters' Andes frog (Phrynopus peruanus)
- Coloma's noble rainfrog (Phyllonastes coloma)
- Pristimantis albericoi (possibly extinct)
- Cutín allpapuyu (Pristimantis allpapuyu)
- Pristimantis almendariz
- Giant páramo rainfrog (Pristimantis andinogigas)
- Aragua robber frog (Pristimantis anotis) (possibly extinct)
- Atillo rain frog (Pristimantis atillo)
- Barriga's rainfrog (Pristimantis barrigai)
- Argelia robber frog (Pristimantis bernali) (possibly extinct)
- Cacao robber frog (Pristimantis cacao)
- Cañari robber frog (Pristimantis caniari)
- La Palma robber frog (Pristimantis caprifer)
- Choco's robber frog (Pristimantis chocoensis)
- Pristimantis chrysops
- Rio Cosnipata robber frog (Pristimantis cosnipatae)
- Pristimantis deinops
- Rio Calima robber frog (Pristimantis diaphonus)
- Pristimantis diogenes
- Duellman's robber frog (Pristimantis duellmani)
- Blood rain frog (Pristimantis erythros)
- Grenada frog (Pristimantis euphronides)
- Nono robber frog (Pristimantis hamiotae) (possibly extinct)
- Hoogmoed's red-eyed landfrog (Pristimantis hoogmoedi)
- Pristimantis imthurni
- Jaime's robber frog (Pristimantis jaimei)
- Pristimantis jamescameroni
- Jiménez de la Espada’s rain frog (Pristimantis jimenezi)
- Pristimantis kareliae
- Pristimantis kelephus
- Pristimantis lichenoides
- Long-bodied Paria landfrog (Pristimantis longicorpus)
- Malli's rain frog (Pristimantis mallii)
- Pristimantis mars
- Uribe robber frog (Pristimantis molybrignus) (possibly extinct)
- Nangaritza rain frog (Pristimantis nangaritza)
- Rain frog of Paquisha (Pristimantis paquishae)
- Cotopaxi robber frog (Pristimantis phoxocephalus)
- Sugar robber frog (Pristimantis phragmipleuron)
- Pristimantis polemistes
- Agua robber frog (Pristimantis pugnax)
- Pristimantis punzan
- Lynch's Pilaló robber frog (Pristimantis pyrrhomerus)
- Pristimantis reclusus
- Despax's robber frog (Pristimantis riveti)
- Motelluro robber frog (Pristimantis ruidus) (possibly extinct)
- Sambalan rainfrog (Pristimantis sambalan)
- Priest Saturnio rainfrog (Pristimantis saturninoi)
- Pristimantis signifer
- Simon's robber frog (Pristimantis simonbolivari)
- Gambira robber frog (Pristimantis spilogaster)
- Periquito robber frog (Pristimantis stenodiscus)
- Merida cable car frog (Pristimantis telefericus)
- Tesla's rain frog (Pristimantis teslai)
- Pristimantis thyellus
- Greater Pilaló robber frog (Pristimantis thymalopsoides)
- Pristimantis torrenticola
- Pristimantis tribulosus
- Pristimantis turumiquirensis
- Pristimantis veletis
- Warty flank rain frog (Pristimantis verrucolatus)
- Pristimantis xylochobates
- Choco robber frog (Strabomantis anomalus)
- Nudibara robber frog (Strabomantis cadenai) (possibly extinct)
- Palma Real robber frog (Strabomantis cerastes)
- Rio Pitzara robber frog (Strabomantis helonotus) (possibly extinct)
- Mindo robber frog (Strabomantis necerus) (possibly extinct)

=== Hemiphractidae ===
Marsupial frogs, horned treefrogs, backpack frogs, and allies

- Pacific marsupial frog (Gastrotheca angustifrons)
- Gastrotheca antomia
- Calilegua's marsupial frog (Gastrotheca christiani)
- Horned marsupial frog (Gastrotheca cornuta)
- Azuay marsupial frog (Gastrotheca litonedis)
- Hemiphractus elioti
- Hemiphractus panamensis

=== Hylidae ===
Tree frogs and allies

- Brazilian river treefrog (Aplastodiscus flumineus)
- Musical treefrog (Aplastodiscus musicus)
- Atlantihyla melissa
- Guatemala stream frog (Atlantihyla panchoi)
- Rio treefrog (Boana claresignata)
- Sao Paulo treefrog (Boana clepsydra) (possibly extinct)
- Izecksohn's treefrog (Bokermannohyla izecksohni)
- Bokermannohyla ravida
- Socopo treefrog (Dendropsophus amicorum)
- Dendropsophus nekronastes
- Bocourt's treefrog (Dryophytes bocourti) (possibly extinct)
- Oaxacan fringe-limbed treefrog (Ecnomiohyla echinata) (possibly extinct)
- Rabb's fringe-limbed treefrog (Ecnomiohyla rabborum) (possibly extinct)
- Lichenose fringe-limbed treefrog (Ecnomiohyla valancifer)
- Hyloscirtus charazani
- Parjacti treefrog (Hyloscirtus chlorosteus) (possibly extinct)
- Hyloscirtus hillisi
- Lynch's Colombian treefrog (Hyloscirtus lynchi)
- Rio Chingual Valley treefrog (Hyloscirtus pantostictus)
- Cuellaje stream treefrog (Hyloscirtus princecharlesi)
- Narrow-lined tree frog (Isthmohyla angustilineata)
- Isthmohyla calypsa (possibly extinct)
- Isla Bonita tree frog (Isthmohyla debilis)
- Continental Divide tree frog (Isthmohyla graceae)
- Pico blanco treefrog (Isthmohyla pictipes)
- Starrett's treefrog (Isthmohyla tica)
- Mixe tree frog (Megastomatohyla mixe)
- Cloud forest treefrog (Megastomatohyla nubicola)
- Oaxacan yellow tree frog (Megastomatohyla pellita)
- Nyctimantis pomba
- Ololygon muriciensis
- Ololygon peixotoi
- Plectrohyla calvata
- Plectrohyla chrysopleura
- Honduras spikethumb frog (Plectrohyla dasypus)
- Plectrohyla exquisita
- Forest spikethumb frog (Plectrohyla glandulosa)
- Plectrohyla pycnochila
- Cave spikethumb frog (Plectrohyla tecunumani)
- Alta Verapaz spikethumb frog (Plectrohyla teuchestes)
- Phantom treefrog (Ptychohyla dendrophasma)
- Warty mountain stream frog (Quilticohyla acrochorda)
- Cerro Pelón treefrog (Sarcohyla calvicollina) (possibly extinct)
- Pueblo treefrog (Sarcohyla charadricola) (possibly extinct)
- Aquatic treefrog (Sarcohyla crassa)
- Blue-eyed aquatic treefrog (Sarcohyla cyanomma) (possibly extinct)
- Grasping treefrog (Sarcohyla labedactyla)
- Semiaquatic treefrog (Sarcohyla pachyderma)
- Speckled treefrog (Sarcohyla psarosema)
- Sierra Juarez treefrog (Sarcohyla sabrina)
- Voiceless treefrog (Sarcohyla siopela) (possibly extinct)
- Toyota's treefrog (Sarcohyla toyota)
- Bahia lime treefrog (Sphaenorhynchus bromelicola)
- Sphaenorhynchus cammaeus
- Tapir Valley tree frog (Tlalocohyla celeste)

=== Phyllomedusidae ===
Leaf frogs

- Lemur leaf frog (Agalychnis lemur)
- Lutz's phyllomedusa (Phrynomedusa appendiculata)
- Bi-colored leaf frog (Phrynomedusa marginata) (possibly extinct)
- Vanzolini's leaf frog (Phrynomedusa vanzolinii) (possibly extinct)
- Pithecopus rusticus

=== Pelodryadidae ===
Australian tree frogs

- Yellow-spotted tree frog (Litoria castanea) (possibly extinct)
- Kroombit treefrog (Litoria kroombitensis)
- Armoured frog (Litoria lorica)
- Kuranda tree frog (Litoria myola)
- Spencer's river tree frog (Litoria spenceri)

=== Bufonidae ===
True toads

- Osgood's Ethiopian toad (Altiphrynoides osgoodi) (possibly extinct)
- Houston toad (Anaxyrus houstonensis)
- Hot Creek toad (Anaxyrus monfontanus)
- Amargosa toad (Anaxyrus nelsoni)
- Dixie Valley toad (Anaxyrus williamsi)
- Mesilau stream toad (Ansonia guibei)
- Cave-dwelling stream toad (Ansonia khaochangensis)
- Murud black slender toad (Ansonia vidua)
- Angelito stubfoot toad (Atelopus angelito) (possibly extinct)
- Atelopus ardila (possibly extinct)
- Starry night harlequin toad (Atelopus arsyecue)
- Arthur's stubfoot toad (Atelopus arthuri)
- Rio Pescado stubfoot toad (Atelopus balios)
- Azuay stubfoot toad (Atelopus bomolochos)
- Boulenger's stubfoot toad (Atelopus boulengeri)
- Calima harlequin toad (Atelopus calima)
- Venezuelan yellow frog (Atelopus carbonerensis) (possibly extinct)
- Darien stubfoot toad (Atelopus certus)
- Chocó stubfoot toad (Atelopus chocoensis)
- Red and yellow stubfoot toad (Atelopus chrysocorallus)
- Rio Faisanes stubfoot toad (Atelopus coynei)
- Veragua stubfoot toad (Atelopus cruciger)
- Huila stubfoot toad (Atelopus ebenoides)
- Atelopus epikeisthos
- Carabaya stubfoot toad (Atelopus erythropus)
- Malvasa stubfoot toad (Atelopus eusebianus)
- Atelopus eusebiodiazi (possibly extinct)
- Atelopus famelicus
- Forest stubfoot toad (Atelopus farci)
- Atelopus gigas (possibly extinct)
- Pirri Range harlequin frog (Atelopus glyphus)
- Guanujo stubfoot toad (Atelopus guanujo) (possibly extinct)
- Morona-Santiago stubfoot toad (Atelopus halihelos) (possibly extinct)
- Limosa harlequin frog (Atelopus limosus)
- Longnose stubfoot toad (Atelopus longirostris)
- Atelopus lozanoi
- Lynch's glassfrog (Atelopus lynchi) (possibly extinct)
- Quito stubfoot toad (Atelopus ignescens)
- Atelopus marinkellei
- Mindo stubfoot toad (Atelopus mindoensis) (possibly extinct)
- Colombian stubfoot toad (Atelopus minutulus)
- Atelopus monohernandezii
- Mucubaji stubfoot toad (Atelopus mucubajiensis)
- La Arboleda stubfoot toad (Atelopus muisca)
- Atelopus nanay
- Gualecenita stubfoot toad (Atelopus nepiozomus)
- Niceforo's stubfoot toad (Atelopus nicefori)
- Nocturnal harlequin toad (Atelopus nocturnus)
- Atelopus onorei (possibly extinct)
- Atelopus orcesi
- Rednose stubfoot toad (Atelopus oxyrhynchus) (possibly extinct)
- Schmidt's stubfoot toad (Atelopus pachydermus) (possibly extinct)
- Atelopus palmatus
- Atelopus pastuso (possibly extinct)
- Atelopus patazensis
- San Isidro stubfoot toad (Atelopus pedimarmoratus)
- Peru stubfoot toad (Atelopus peruensis) (possibly extinct)
- Atelopus petersi (possibly extinct)
- Atelopus petriruizi
- Atelopus pictiventris
- Green and red venter harlequin toad (Atelopus pinangoi) (possibly extinct)
- Flat-spined atelopus (Atelopus planispina) (possibly extinct)
- Atelopus podocarpus (possibly extinct)
- Atelopus pyrodactylus
- Atelopus quimbaya
- Anori stubfoot toad (Atelopus sanjosei)
- Atelopus sernai (possibly extinct)
- Atelopus simulatus (possibly extinct)
- Atelopus sonsonensis
- Scarlet harlequin toad (Atelopus sorianoi) (possibly extinct)
- Bogota stubfoot toad (Atelopus subornatus)
- Tamá harlequin frog (Atelopus tamaense)
- Bolivian stubfoot toad (Atelopus tricolor)
- Variable harlequin frog (Atelopus varius)
- Cerro Campana stubfoot toad (Atelopus zeteki) (possibly extinct in the wild)
- Luchun stream toad (Bufo luchunnicus)
- Bufo tuberospinius
- Khasi Hill rock toad (Bufoides meghalayanus)
- Cape mountain toad (Capensibufo rosei)
- Beautiful metallic toad (Churamiti maridadi)
- Dendrophryniscus davori
- Noellert's toad (Duttaphrynus noellerti)
- Pico Blanco toad (Incilius fastidiosus) (possibly extinct)
- Holdridge's toad (Incilius holdridgei)
- Chief's toad (Incilius majordomus) (possibly extinct)
- Almirante Trail toad (Incilius peripatetes) (possibly extinct)
- Mount Kenya forest toad (Kenyaphrynoides vulcani)
- Bleeding toad (Leptophryne cruentata)
- Admirable redbelly toad (Melanophryniscus admirabilis)
- Brazilian redbelly toad (Melanophryniscus cambaraensis)
- Redbelly toad (Melanophryniscus langonei)
- Melanophryniscus peritus (possibly extinct)
- Melanophrysicus setiba
- Mertensophryne usambarae
- Nannophryne apolobambica
- Paramo toad (Nannophryne cophotis)
- Wide-headed viviparous toad (Nectophrynoides laticeps)
- Paula's viviparous toad (Nectophrynoides paulae)
- Poynton's forest toad (Nectophrynoides poyntoni) (possibly extinct)
- Pseudo forest toad (Nectophrynoides pseudotornieri)
- Uzungwe scarp tree toad (Nectophrynoides wendyae)
- Western Nimba toad (Nimbaphrynoides occidentalis)
- Cofan plump toad (Osornophryne cofanorum)
- Pelophryne linanitensis
- Pelophryne murudensis
- Hispaniolan armored toad (Peltophryne armata)
- Hispaniolan crestless toad (Peltophryne fluviatica) (possibly extinct)
- Western Cuba long-nosed toad (Peltophryne longinasus)
- Eastern Cuba long-nosed toad (Peltophryne ramsdeni) (possibly extinct)
- Western Andes toad (Rhaebo atelopoides)
- Colombian giant toad (Rhaebo blombergi)
- Blue-spotted toad (Rhaebo caeruleostictus)
- Tandapaya Andes toad (Rhaebo olallai)
- Rhinella amabilis (possibly extinct)
- Rhinella chrysophora (possibly extinct)
- Mesopotamia beaked toad (Rhinella rostrata) (possibly extinct)
- Perret's toad (Sclerophrys perreti)
- Amatola toad (Vandijkophrynus amatolicus)
- Bamboutos smalltongue toad (Werneria bambutensis)
- Werneria iboundji
- Mertens' smalltongue toad (Werneria mertensiana)
- Tandy's smalltongue toad (Werneria tandyi)
- Wolterstorffina chirioi
- Cameroon Wolterstorff toad (Wolterstorffina parvipalmata)

=== Aromobatidae ===
Cryptic forest frogs

- Caribbean nurse frog (Allobates caribe)
- Martinique volcano frog (Allobates chalcopis)
- Allobates mcdiarmidi
- Llanos rocket frog (Allobates ranoides)
- Degranville's rocket frog (Anomaloglossus degranvillei)
- Anomaloglossus dewynteri
- Anomaloglossus tepequem
- White-dotted rocket frog (Aromobates alboguttatus)
- Las Escalera's skunk frog (Aromobates cannatellai)
- Aromobates duranti
- Aromobates haydeeae
- Mucubají skunk frog (Aromobates leopardalis) (possibly extinct)
- Merida rocket frog (Aromobates meridensis)
- Molinari's rocket frog (Aromobates molinarii)
- Skunk frog (Aromobates nocturnus) (possibly extinct)
- Tachira rocket frog (Aromobates orostoma)
- Sierra rocket frog (Aromobates serranus)
- Arp's rocket frog (Aromobates walterarpi)
- Mucuchíes' frog (Aromobates zippeli)
- Mannophryne neblina
- Speer's collared frog (Mannophryne speeri)
- Prostherapis dunni (possibly extinct)

=== Dendrobatidae ===
Poison dart frogs

- Oxapampa poison frog (Ameerega planipaleae)
- Collins' poison frog (Andinobates abditus) (possibly extinct)
- Geminis' dart frog (Andinobates geminisae)
- Supatá golden poison frog (Andinobates supata)
- Green poison frog (Andinobates viridis)
- Colostethus jacobuspetersi
- Truando rocket frog (Colostethus latinasus)
- Ectopoglossus atopoglossus
- Bello rocket frog (Hyloxalus abditaurantius)
- South American rocket frog (Hyloxalus anthracinus)
- Hyloxalus delatorreae
- Edwards' rocket frog (Hyloxalus edwardsi) (possibly extinct)
- Yapitya rocket frog (Hyloxalus exasperatus)
- Cotopaci rocket frog (Hyloxalus fallax)
- Rio Negro rocket frog (Hyloxalus marmoreoventris)
- Hyloxalus maquipucuna
- Funny rocket frog (Hyloxalus peculiaris)
- San Vicente rocket frog (Hyloxalus pumilus)
- Ruiz's rocket frog (Hyloxalus ruizi) (possibly extinct)
- Santiago rocket frog (Hyloxalus shuar)
- Bilsa white-chested frog (Leucostethus bilsa)
- Minyobates steyermarki
- Polkadot poison frog (Oophaga arborea)
- Harlequin poison frog (Oophaga histrionica)
- Lehmann's poison frog (Oophaga lehmanni)
- Oophaga occultator
- La Planada poison frog (Paruwrobates andinus)
- Palenque poison frog (Paruwrobates erythromos)

=== Leptodactylidae ===
Southern frogs

- Tody tyrant-voiced nest-building frog (Adenomera phonotriccus)
- Itambe's bromeliad frog (Crossodactylodes itambe)
- Mountain chicken (Leptodactylus fallax)
- Teachers' frog (Leptodactylus magistris)
- Honduras white-lipped frog (Leptodactylus silvanimbus)
- Lutz's rapids frog (Paratelmatobius lutzii)
- Paratelmatobius mantiqueira
- El Rincon stream frog (Pleurodema somuncurense)
- Physalaemus angrensis
- Santa Cruz drawrf frog (Physalaemus soaresi)

=== Centrolenidae ===
Glass frogs

- Buckley's glass frog (Centrolene buckleyi)
- Pacific giant glass frog (Centrolene geckoidea) (possibly extinct)
- Amazon giant glass frog (Centrolene pipilata) (possibly extinct)
- Ridge cochran frog (Cochranella euhystrix)
- Nymphargus armatus
- Manduriacu glass frog (Nymphargus manduriacu)
- Large-headed glass frog (Nymphargus megacheirus) (possibly extinct)
- Nymphargus mixomaculatus
- Sucre's glass frog (Nymphargus sucre)
- Trueb's cochran frog (Nymphargus truebae) (possibly extinct)
- Wiley's glassfrog (Nymphargus wileyi)

=== Odontophrynidae ===
Odontophrynid frogs

- Proceratophrys ararype
- Plateau smooth horned frog (Proceratophrys palustris)

=== Cycloramphidae ===
Button frogs and allies

- Santa Catarina button frog (Cycloramphus catarinensis) (possibly extinct)
- Cedros button frog (Cycloramphus cedrensis) (possibly extinct)
- San Bento button frog (Cycloramphus diringshofeni) (possibly extinct)
- Granular button frog (Cycloramphus granulosus) (possibly extinct)
- Carvalho's button frog (Cycloramphus heyeri)
- Wandolleck's button frog (Cycloramphus ohausi) (possibly extinct)
- Campo Grande button frog (Cycloramphus semipalmatus) (possibly extinct)
- Stejneger's button frog (Cycloramphus stejnegeri) (possibly extinct)
- Gruta button frog (Cycloramphus valae) (possibly extinct)
- Lutz's river frog (Thoropa lutzi) (possibly extinct)
- Petropolis river frog (Thoropa petropolitana) (possibly extinct)

=== Alsodidae ===
Spiny-chest frogs and allies

- Cantillana spiny-chest frog (Alsodes cantillanensis)
- Pehuenche spiny-chest frog (Alsodes pehuenche)
- Mocha Island ground frog (Eupsophus insularis)

=== Hylodidae ===
Neotropical torrent frogs

- Crossodactylus boulengeri (possibly extinct)
- Crossodactylus dantei
- Crossodactylus dispar (possibly extinct)
- Crossodactylus franciscanus (possibly extinct)
- Crossodactylus grandis (possibly extinct)
- Itatiaia tree toad (Hylodes glaber) (possibly extinct)
- Mertens' tree toad (Hylodes mertensi) (possibly extinct)
- Royal tree toad (Hylodes regius)
- Vanzolini's tree toad (Hylodes vanzolinii) (possibly extinct)

=== Telmatobiidae ===
Water frogs

- Atacama water frog (Telmatobius atacamensis)
- Telmatobius bolivianus
- Catamarca water frog (Telmatobius ceiorum)
- Loja water frog (Telmatobius cirrhacelis) (possibly extinct)
- Loa water frog (Telmatobius dankoi)
- Telmatobius edaphonastes
- Telmatobius espadai (possibly extinct)
- Telmatobius fronteriensis
- Telmatobius laticeps
- Telmatobius mendelsoni
- Black water frog (Telmatobius niger) (possibly extinct)
- Arica water frog (Telmatobius pefauri) (possibly extinct)
- Telmatobius philippii
- Sanborn's water frog (Telmatobius sanborni)
- Andagala water frog (Telmatobius scrocchii)
- Telmatobius sibiricus
- Sucre water frog (Telmatobius simonsi)
- Tojologue water frog (Telmatobius timens)
- Vellard's water frog (Telmatobius vellardi) (possibly extinct)
- Andean water frog (Telmatobius ventriflavum)
- Telmatobius verrucosus
- Telmatobius vilamensis
- Sehuencas water frog (Telmatobius yuracare)

=== Batrachylidae ===
Patagonia frogs and allies

- Patagonia frog (Atelognathus patagonicus)

=== Rhinodermatidae ===
Darwin's frogs

- Northern Darwin's frog (Rhinoderma rufum) (possibly extinct)

=== Microhylidae ===
Narrow-mouthed frogs

- Anilany helenae
- Anodonthyla eximia
- Anodonthyla theoi
- Anodonthyla vallani
- Choerophryne sanguinopicta
- Choerophryne siegfriedi
- Elegant frog (Cophixalus concinnus)
- Mcdonald's frog (Cophixalus mcdonaldi)
- Cophixalus misimae
- Mountaintop nursery frog (Cophixalus monticola)
- Neglected nursery frog (Cophixalus neglectus)
- Cophixalus timidus
- Cophyla maharipeo
- Cophyla puellarum
- Cameron highland sticky frog (Kalophrynus yongi)
- Beilun pygmy frog (Microhyla beilunensis)
- Franky's narrow-mouthed frog (Mysticellus franki)
- Oreophryne ezra
- Oreophryne matawan
- Oreophryne penelopeia
- Paedophryne kathismaphlox
- Amani forest frog (Parhoplophryne usambarica) (possibly extinct)
- Platypelis ando
- Platypelis karenae
- Diadem saw-browed diamond frog (Rhombophryne diadema)
- Rhombophryne matavy
- Rhombophryne proportionalis
- Tenasserim cave frog (Siamophryne troglodytes)
- Stumpffia achillei
- Stumpffia analamaina
- Stumpffia betampona
- Stumpffia contumelia
- Stumpffia davidattenboroughi
- Stumpffia diutissima
- Stumpffia dolchi
- Stumpffia edmondsi
- Stumpffia fusca
- Stumpffia hara
- Stumpffia huwei
- Stumpffia jeannoeli
- Stumpffia larinki
- Stumpffia makira
- Stumpffia maledicta
- Stumpffia meikeae
- Stumpffia miovaova
- Stumpffia obscoena
- Stumpffia spandei
- Stumpffia tetradactyla
- Guibe's stump-toed frog (Stumpffia tridactyla)

=== Brevicipitidae ===
Rain frogs

- Bale Mountains tree frog (Balebreviceps hillmani)
- Taita Hills warty frog (Callulina dawida)
- Kanga warty frog (Callulina kanga)
- Nguru warty frog (Callulina meteora)
- Callulina stanleyi

=== Hyperoliidae ===
African reed frogs

- Smooth egg-guarding frog (Hyperolius jynx)
- Davenport's reed frog (Hyperolius davenporti)
- Hyperolius ruvuensis
- Tanners' reed frog (Hyperolius tanneri)
- Hyperolius ukaguruensis
- Hyperolius watsonae

=== Arthroleptidae ===
Screeching frogs

- Earless squeaker (Arthroleptis anotis)
- Krokosua squeaking frog (Arthroleptis krokosua)
- Overlooked squeaker frog (Arthroleptis kutogundua) (possibly extinct)
- Nike's squeaker (Arthroleptis nikeae)
- Strident squeaker (Arthroleptis stridens)
- Cave squeaker (Arthroleptis troglodytes) (possibly extinct)
- Nganha night frog (Astylosternus nganhanus)
- Cardioglossa manengouba
- Cardioglossa trifasciata
- Leptodactylodon axillaris
- Redbelly egg frog (Leptodactylodon erythrogaster)
- Leptodactylodon wildi

=== Micrixalidae ===
Dancing frogs

- Spotted dancing frog (Micrixalus specca)
- Cave dancing frog (Micrixalus spelunca)

=== Phrynobatrachidae ===
Puddle frogs

- Afia Birago's puddle frog (Phrynobatrachus afiabirago)
- Short-headed puddle frog (Phrynobatrachus breviceps)
- Spiny puddle frog (Phrynobatrachus chukuchuku)
- Intermediate puddle frog (Phrynobatrachus intermedius)
- Irangi puddle frog (Phrynobatrachus irangi)
- Jim Zimkus' puddle frog (Phrynobatrachus jimzimkusi)
- Manengouba river frog (Phrynobatrachus manengoubensis)
- Lake Oku puddle frog (Phrynobatrachus njiomock)
- Steindachner's river frog (Phrynobatrachus steindachneri)

=== Conrauidae ===
Slippery frogs

- Togo slippery frog (Conraua derooi)
- Atewa slippery frog (Conraua sagyimase)

=== Petropedetidae ===
African torrent frogs

- Du Toit's torrent frog (Arthroleptides dutoiti) (possibly extinct)
- Perret's water frog (Petropedetes perreti)

=== Pyxicephalidae ===
Box-headed frogs

- Rough moss frog (Arthroleptella rugosa)
- Northern moss frog (Arthroleptella subvoce)
- Bale Mountains frog (Ericabatrachus baleensis)
- Quirimbas mongrel frog (Nothophryne unilurio)

=== Nyctibatrachidae ===
Robust frogs

- Corrugated frog (Lankanectes pera)
- Indraneil's night frog (Nyctibatrachus indraneili)

=== Ceratobatrachidae ===
Wrinkled ground frogs and allies

- Gigante wrinkled ground frog (Platymantis insulatus)

=== Dicroglossidae ===
Fork-tongued frogs

- Occidozyga tompotika

=== Rhacophoridae ===
Shrub frogs

- Jinggang tree frog (Gracixalus jinggangensis)
- Jacobson's bubble-nest frog (Philautus jacobsoni) (possibly extinct)
- Kobo bubble-nest frog (Philautus microdiscus)
- Bambaradeniya's shrub frog (Pseudophilautus bambaradeniyai)
- Dayawansa's shrub frog (Pseudophilautus dayawansai)
- Elegant shrub frog (Pseudophilautus decoris)
- Jagath Gunawardana's shrub frog (Pseudophilautus jagathgunawardanai)
- Karunarathna's shrub frog (Pseudophilautus karunarathnai)
- Pseudophilautus lunatus
- Pseudophilautus mooreorum
- Newton Jayawardane's shrub frog (Pseudophilautus newtonjayawardanei)
- Pseudophilautus ocularis
- Poppy's shrub frog (Pseudophilautus poppiae)
- Samrakoon's shrub frog (Pseudophilautus samarakoon)
- Pseudophilautus simba
- Siril Wijesundara's shrub frog (Pseudophilautus sirilwijesundarai)
- Pseudophilautus stellatus
- Stuart's shrub frog (Pseudophilautus stuarti)
- Raorchestes aureus
- Tura bubble-nest frog (Raorchestes kempiae)
- Mark's bushfrog (Raorchestes marki)
- Raorchestes primarrumpfi

=== Mantellidae ===
Mantellid frogs

- Boophis ankarafensis
- Boophis baetkei
- Boophis liami
- Mandraka bright-eyed frog (Boophis mandraka)
- Boophis tsilomaro
- Williams' bright-eyed frog (Boophis williamsi)
- Gephyromantis mafy
- Guibemantis diphonus
- Dotted Madagascar frog (Guibemantis punctatus)
- Black-eared mantella (Mantella milotympanum)
- Madagascar frog (Mantidactylus pauliani)
- Mantidactylus zolitschka
- Spinomantis nussbaumi

=== Ranidae ===
True frogs

- Dehradun stream frog (Amolops chakrataensis)
- Gunung Jerai black stream frog (Hylarana nazgul)
- Lago de las Minas frog (Lithobates chichicuahutla)
- Little Corn Island frog (Lithobates miadis)
- Puebla frog (Lithobates pueblae) (possibly extinct)
- Mississippi gopher frog (Lithobates sevosus)
- Tlaloc's leopard frog (Lithobates tlaloci) (possibly extinct)
- Hainan music frog (Nidirana hainanensis)
- Chevron-spotted brown frog (Rana chevronta) (possibly extinct)
- Tavas frog (Rana tavasensis)

== Gymnophiona ==
- Denhardt's caecilian (Boulengerula denhardti)
- Spawls' boolee (Boulengerula spawlsi)
- Mount Oku caecilian (Crotaphatrema lamottei)
- Mahe caecilian (Hypogeophis brevis)
- Montane Mahé caecilian (Hypogeophis montanus)
- Petite praslin caecilian (Hypogeophis pti)
- Equatorial caecilian (Oscaecilia equatorialis)

== See also ==
- Lists of IUCN Red List critically endangered species
- List of least concern amphibians
- List of near threatened amphibians
- List of vulnerable amphibians
- List of endangered amphibians
- List of recently extinct amphibians
- List of data deficient amphibians
