= Northwestern Andean montane forests =

Ecoregion in Colombia and Ecuador

Northwestern Andean montane forests (NT0145)
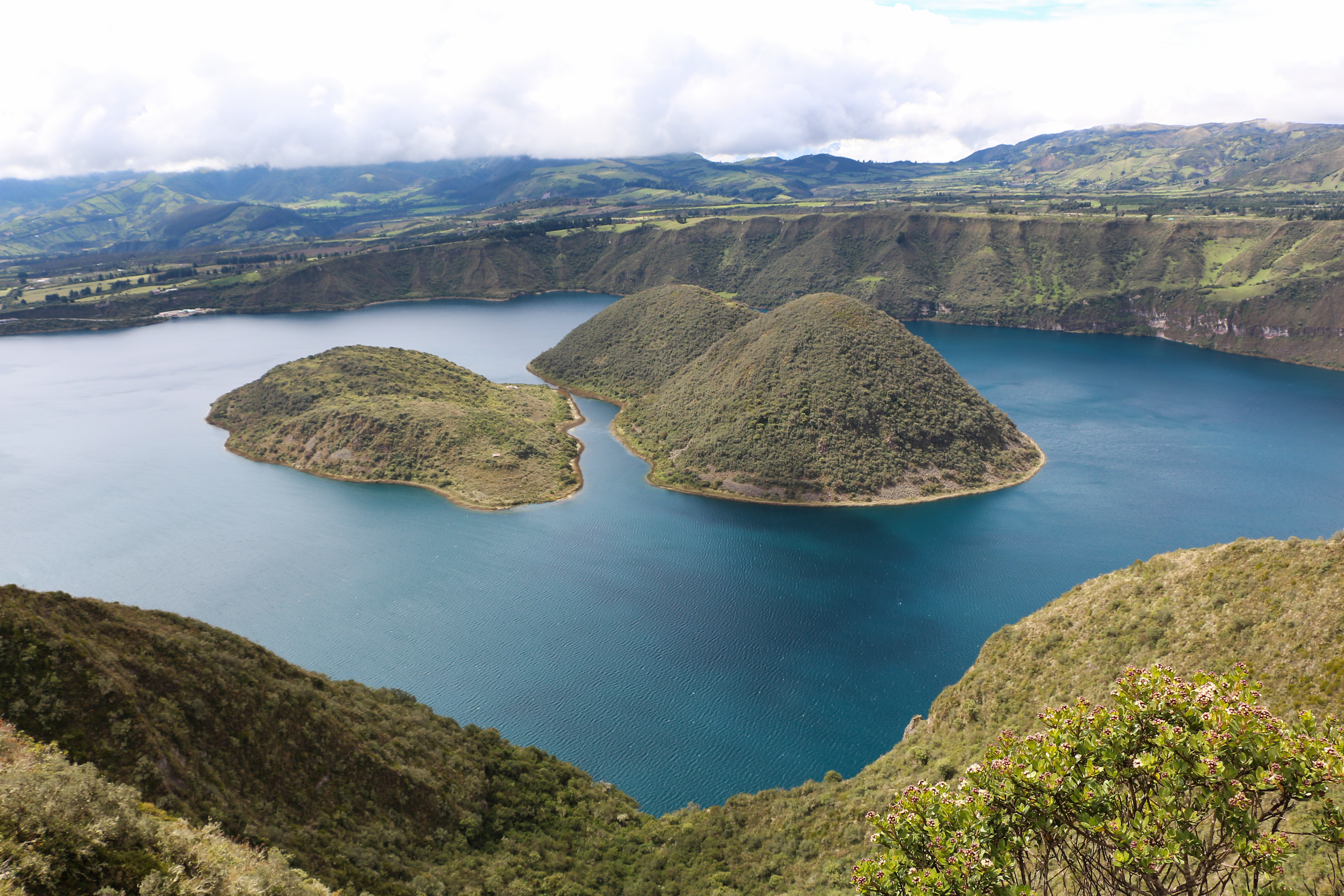
- Caldera of Cuicocha in the Cotacachi-Cayapas Ecological Reserve, Écuador

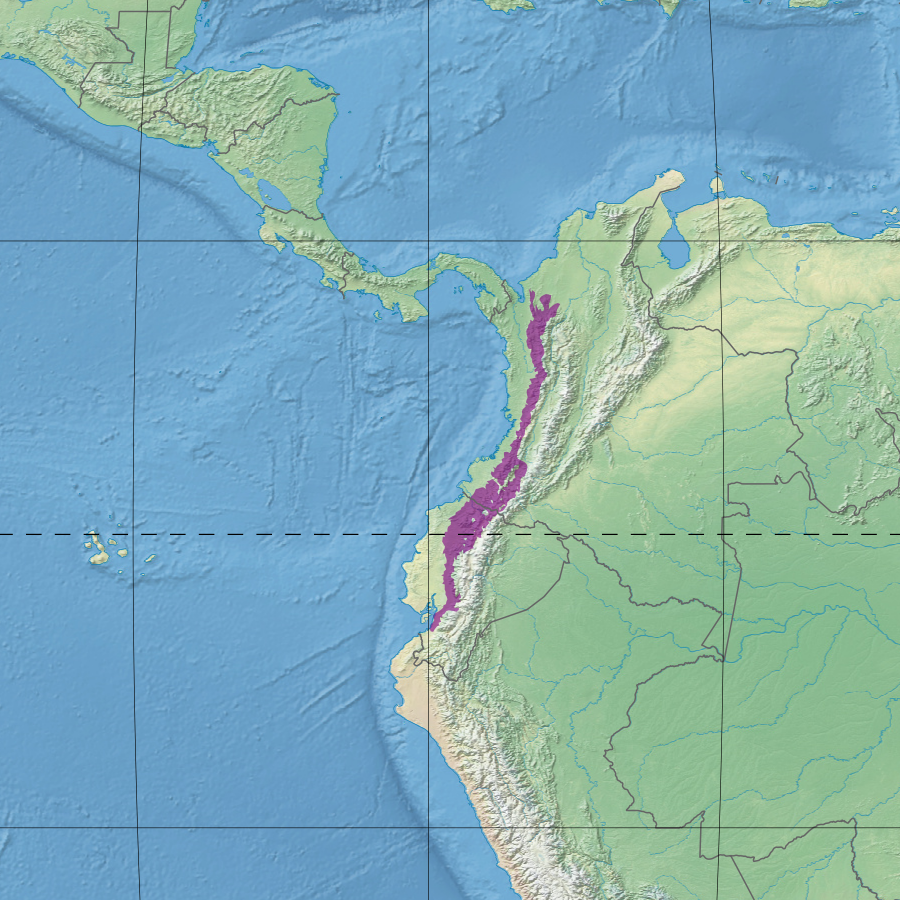
- Ecoregion territory (in purple)

Ecology
- Realm: Neotropical
- Biome: Tropical and subtropical moist broadleaf forests
- Borders: List: Cauca Valley montane forests; Chocó–Darién moist forests; Eastern Cordillera Real montane forests; Magdalena–Urabá moist forests; Northern Andean páramo; Patía Valley dry forests; Tumbes–Piura dry forests; Western Ecuador moist forests

Geography
- Area: 81,325 km^{2} (31,400 mi^{2})
- Countries: Colombia, Ecuador
- Coordinates: 0.929°N 78.123°W
- Climate type: Af: equatorial; fully humid

Conservation
- Conservation status: Vulnerable
- Global 200: Northern Andean Montane Forests
- Protected: 15.025%

The Northwestern Andean montane forests (NT0145) is an ecoregion on the Andes mountains in the west of Colombia and Ecuador. Both flora and fauna are highly diverse due to effect of ice ages when the warmer climate zones were separated and the cooler ones combined, and interglacial periods when the reverse occurred. Because the environment is hospitable to humans, the habitat has been drastically modified by farming and grazing since the Pre-Columbian era.

== Geography ==
=== Location ===
The Northwestern Andean montane forests ecoregion extends along the Cordillera Occidental (Western Range) of the Andes in Colombia and the Cordillera Occidental of Ecuador. It covers an area of 8,132,562 hectares (20,096,000 acres).

In the extreme north the ecoregion merges into the Magdalena–Urabá moist forests ecoregion. Through most of its length in Colombia it transitions on the west into the Chocó–Darién moist forests and on the east into the Cauca Valley montane forests. The higher levels of the ecoregion give way to Northern Andean páramo. In the central section it almost completely surrounds the Patía Valley dry forests. In its southern section the ecoregion transitions into the Western Ecuador moist forests to the west and the Eastern Cordillera Real montane forests to the east. The southern end of the ecoregion transitions into the Tumbes–Piura dry forests ecoregion.

=== Terrain ===
The ecoregion covers the western range of the Andes with a wide band of elevations including isolated peaks and massifs at the upper levels.

=== Climate ===
The ecoregion is within the Inter-Tropical Convergence Zone, and its climate is humid and tropical. Rainfall averages 2,000 to 4,000 mm/year, but can decrease to 1,000 to 2,000 mm at higher altitudes.

At a sample location at coordinates 2.25°N 77.75°W the Köppen climate classification is Af: equatorial, fully humid. Mean temperatures range from 25.8 °C (78.4 °F) in November to 26.4 °C (79.5 °F) in March. Total annual rainfall is about 3,300 millimetres (130 in). Monthly rainfall ranges from 179.8 millimetres (7.08 in) in August to 332.3 millimetres (13.08 in) in June.

== Ecology ==
The ecoregion is in the neotropical realm, in the tropical and subtropical moist broadleaf forests biome. It is part of the Northern Andean Montane Forests global ecoregion. This ecoregion contains the Magdalena Valley montane forests, Venezuelan Andes montane forests, Northwestern Andean montane forests, Cauca Valley montane forests, Cordillera Oriental montane forests, Santa Marta montane forests, and Eastern Cordillera Real montane forests terrestrial ecoregions.

The cooling during glacial periods isolated plants and animals adapted to warmer climates into isolated pockets, while the cooler zones expanded and became connected. During the warmer inter-glacial periods the warmer zones rose higher and reconnected, while the cooler zones became isolated. The result was steady formation of new species, creating high levels both of diversity and endemism.

=== Flora ===
The flora of the ecoregion have been the subject of many studies, in South America second only to the Northern Andean páramo and High Monte ecoregions. About 50% of the ecoregion's flora is strictly endemic. The flowering plant species are very diverse, with as many as 300 species in a single 1 hectare (2.5 acres) tract. The main plant communities grow in elevational belts. Species richness generally decreases at higher elevations.

Premontane forests grow between approximately 1000 and 2000 meters elevation, and lower montane forests extend from approximately 2000 to 2800 meters elevation. These forests are also known as sub-Andean forests, with a canopy height of 25 meters or more, which generally decreases with increasing elevation.

The upper montane forests extend from 2800 up to 4000 meters elevation. These forests, also known as elfin forests or cloud forests, have a canopy 15 to 20 meters tall. The epiphyte and understory plant flora is diverse and includes many endemic species of mosses, ferns, aroids, bromeliads, melastomes, and orchids.

Quercus humboldtii, South America's only native oak, grows in the ecoregion. It is also home to Trigonobalanus excelsa, an oak relative whose nearest relatives live in Southeast Asia, and to the Colombian walnut (Juglans neotropica).

=== Fauna ===
Endangered mammals include Baird's tapir (Tapirus bairdii), black-headed spider monkey (Ateles fusciceps), cotton-top tamarin (Saguinus oedipus), equatorial dog-faced bat (Molossops aequatorianus), Geoffroy's spider monkey (Ateles geoffroyi), Hammond's rice rat (Mindomys hammondi) and mountain tapir (Tapirus pinchaque). Other native mammals include the northern pudu (Pudu mephistophiles) and jaguar (Panthera onca).

The ecoregion contains many endemic birds. Endangered birds include the black-and-chestnut eagle (Spizaetus isidori), black-breasted puffleg (Eriocnemis nigrivestis), chestnut-bellied flowerpiercer (Diglossa gloriosissima), Chocó vireo (Vireo masteri), colorful puffleg (Eriocnemis mirabilis), El Oro parakeet (Pyrrhura orcesi), gold-ringed tanager (Bangsia aureocincta), pale-headed brush finch (Atlapetes pallidiceps), rufous-brown solitaire (Cichlopsis leucogenys), turquoise-throated puffleg (Eriocnemis godini), violet-throated metaltail (Metallura baroni) and yellow-eared parrot (Ognorhynchus icterotis).

Endangered reptiles include the Western Ground Snake (Atractus occidentalis), Tropical Lightbulb Lizard (Riama oculata) and Haensch's Whorltail Iguana (Stenocercus haenschi).

Endangered amphibians include

Atelopus stubfoot toads:

- Azuay stubfoot toad (Atelopus bomolochos)
- Rio Carauta stubfoot toad (Atelopus carauta)
- Chocó stubfoot toad (Atelopus chocoensis)
- Rio Faisanes stubfoot toad (Atelopus coynei)
- Atelopus famelicus
- Antado Stubfoot Toad (Atelopus galactogaster)
- Pirri harlequin frog (Atelopus glyphus)
- El Tambo stubfoot toad (Atelopus longibrachius)
- Atelopus lynchi
- Mindo stubfoot toad (Atelopus mindoensis)
- Niceforo's stubfoot toad (Atelopus nicefori)

Centrolene glass frogs:

- Burrowes' giant glass frog (Centrolene ballux)
- Pampas giant glass frog (Centrolene gemmatum)
- Pichincha Giant Glass Frog (Centrolene heloderma)
- Lynch's giant glass frog (Centrolene lynchi)

Pristimantis rain frogs, or robber frogs:

- Sharpsnout robber frog (Pristimantis acutirostris)
- Albericoi robber frog (Pristimantis albericoi)
- Pristimantis angustilineatus
- Murri robber frog (Pristimantis bellona)
- Valle robber frog (Pristimantis cabrerai)
- Cacao robber frog (Pristimantis cacao)
- San Antonio robber frog (Pristimantis calcaratus)
- Pristimantis capitonis
- Pristimantis chrysops
- Pristimantis colomai
- Spring robber frog (Pristimantis crenunguis)
- Pristimantis degener
- Pristimantis deinops
- Pristimantis dissimulatus
- Pristimantis eugeniae
- Nono robber frog (Pristimantis hamiotae)
- Urrao robber frog (Pristimantis johannesdei)
- Maldonado robber frog (Pristimantis loustes)
- Pristimantis mars
- Pristimantis polychrus
- Fern-loving rain frog (Pristimantis pteridophilus)
- Lynch's Pilalo robber frog (Pristimantis pyrrhomerus)
- Ricuarte robber frog (Pristimantis scolodiscus)
- Reserve robber frog (Pristimantis siopelus)
- Pristimantis sobetes
- Channel robber frog (Pristimantis sulculus)
- Cloud forest robber frog (Pristimantis surdus)
- Cerro Munchique robber frog (Pristimantis viridicans)

Other frogs:

- Carchi Andes toad (Rhaebo colomai)
- Mertens' rocket frog (Colostethus mertensi)
- Dendropsophus gryllatus
- Cerro Munchique marsupial frog (Gastrotheca trachyceps)
- Pilalo tree frog (Hyloscirtus ptychodactylus)
- Simmons' tree frog (Hyloscirtus simmonsi)
- Loja Rocket Frog (Hyloxalus elachyhistus)
- Hyloxalus toachi
- Boulenger's rocket frog (Hyloxalus vertebralis)
- Nymphargus luminosus
- Lehmann's poison frog (Oophaga lehmanni)
- Blue-spotted toad (Rhaebo caeruleostictus)
- Santa Rita beaked toad (Rhinella macrorhina)
- Mesopotamia beaked toad (Rhinella rostrata)
- Rio Pitzara robber frog (Strabomantis helonotus)
- Ruiz's robber frog (Strabomantis ruizi)

== Status ==
The World Wide Fund for Nature (WWF) gives the region the status of "Vulnerable". The climate is hospitable to humans, who have lived in the region since pre-Columbian times, farming and grazing livestock. The environment has thus been greatly modified, although there are still some sizable stands of continuous forest stands. 15.025% of the ecoregion is in protected areas. Protected areas include Cayambe Coca, Sangay, Cotopaxi, and Cajas national parks, Dona Juana-Cascabel Volcanic Complex, Farallones de Cali, Las Orquídeas, Munchique, Paramillo, Purace, and Tatamá national nature parks.

== Sources ==
- Klein, Brad, Western South America: Northwest Colombia to southern Ecuador, WWF
- Feeley, K. (2015), "Are We Filling the Data Void? An Assessment of the Amount and Extent of Plant Collection Records and Census Data Available for Tropical South America", PLOS ONE, 10 (4: e0125629) e0125629, doi:10.1371/journal.pone.0125629, PMC 4416035, PMID 25927831
- Northern Andean Montane Forests, WWF Global, archived from the original on 2017-04-25
- "Northwestern Andean montane forests", Global Species, Myers Enterprises II
- WildFinder, WWF: World Wildlife Fund
