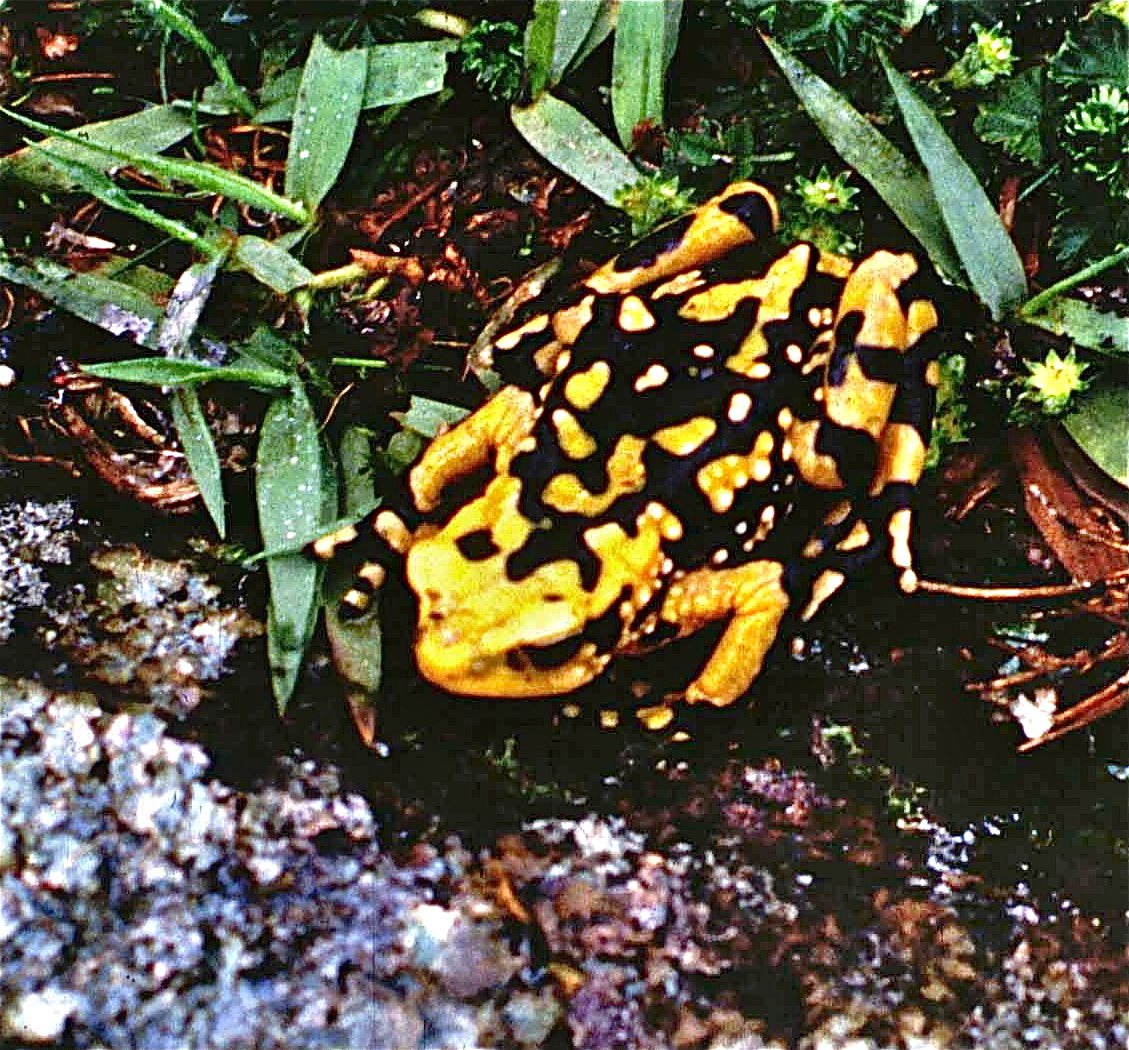

Conservation status
- Critically Endangered (IUCN 3.1)

Scientific classification
- Kingdom: Animalia
- Phylum: Chordata
- Class: Amphibia
- Order: Anura
- Family: Bufonidae
- Genus: Atelopus
- Species: A. petersi

Binomial name
- Atelopus petersi Coloma, Lötters, Duellman, and Miranda-Leiva, 2007

= Atelopus petersi =

Species of amphibian

Atelopus petersi is a species of toad in the family Bufonidae. It is endemic to Ecuador and is known from the Cordillera Oriental in the Napo Province and more provisionally, in the Chimborazo Province. The specific name petersi honors James A. Peters, an American zoologist who collected the first specimens of this species in 1962 and provided a description under the name Atelopus pachydermus. Common names Peters' stubfoot toad and Peters' jambato toad have been coined for it.

== Description ==
Adult males measure 35–42 mm (1.4–1.7 in) and adult females are 43–50 mm (1.7–2.0 in) in snout–vent length. The snout is acuminate. The tympanic membrane, annulus, and stapes are absent. The fingers have lateral fringes but no webbing whereas the toes are webbed. The dorsum has a yellow to orange pattern on black background, and may be almost entirely black. Warts and pustules may have white tops. The flanks are white. The venter is white and may have black marks, or is uniform orange to reddish orange.

== Habitat and conservation ==
Atelopus petersi occurs in montane cloud forests and high montane evergreen forests at elevations of 2,660–3,300 m (8,730–10,830 ft) above sea level. Individuals have been found under rocks at the edge of a stream, in a streambed by day, under logs on a grassy hillside, on a cushion plant in paramo, on a trail, and along the border of a river.

Atelopus petersi was extremely common near Papallacta at the time Peters observed them. The Last confirmed record of the species is from 1996 and is based on a dead animal. However, local people in Oyacachi claimed in 2003 to see single specimens from time to time. It is feared that the species might now be extinct. The precise reasons for this dramatic decline are not known, but climate abnormalities and chytridiomycosis are possible factors.
