= Pristimantis veletis =

Conservation status
- Critically Endangered (IUCN 3.1)

Scientific classification
- Kingdom: Animalia
- Phylum: Chordata
- Class: Amphibia
- Order: Anura
- Family: Strabomantidae
- Genus: Pristimantis
- Species: P. veletis

Binomial name
- Pristimantis veletis (Lynch and Rueda-Almonacid, 1997)
- Pristimantis veletis is only known from Samaná and Pensilvania municipalities in the Cordillera Central of Colombia.

Synonyms
- Eleutherodactylus veletis Lynch and Rueda-Almonacid, 1997

Species of amphibian

Pristimantis veletis is a species of frog in the family Strabomantidae. It is endemic to Colombia and is only known from the vicinity of its type locality in Samaná and Pensilvania municipalities in the Caldas Department, on the eastern slope of the Cordillera Central (Colombian Andes). The specific name veletis is Latin from "skirmisher". It alludes to the resemblance of the color pattern of this frog to the camouflage clothing of the guerillas that were present in the area of the type locality, as well as to the chin pattern that loosely resembles the chevrons in some military uniforms.

== Description ==
Adult males measure 26–28 mm (1.0–1.1 in) and adult females 32–37 mm (1.3–1.5 in) in snout–vent length. The head is as wide as the body and longer than it is wide. The snout is long, subacuminate in dorsal view and rounded in lateral view. The tympanum is prominent and round. The supratympanic fold is weakly developed, visible as a keel behind the tympanum. The fingers and toes are long and slender and have narrow lateral keels and terminal discs; the toe discs are smaller than those on the fingers. Dorsal skin is smooth. Dorsal coloration is pale brown to yellowish ochre with dark brown to nearly black markings. The venter is brown with fine cream mottling of pale gray or black with sepia or black reticulations.

== Habitat and conservation ==
Pristimantis veletis inhabits cloud forests at elevations of 1,800–2,400 m (5,900–7,900 ft) above sea level. It is a nocturnal frog often found perching on medium to high vegetation near streams; by day, it is found in leaf litter on the forest floor. Development is direct, (i.e., there is no free-living larval stage) with up to 18 eggs deposited in moss.

Pristimantis veletis is a rare species—annual surveys to the type locality after 2013 have revealed only one specimen. It is threatened by habitat loss caused by subsistence wood collecting, pine plantations, and agricultural development. However, it occurs in the Selva de Florencia National Natural Park, a well protected-area.
