= Andreas Kay =

Wildlife photographer and naturalist (1963–2019)

- Born: 30 January 1963; Köln, Germany
- Died: 8 October 2019 (aged 56)
- Occupations: Photographer and naturalist

Andreas Kay (30 January 1963 – 8 October 2019) was a wildlife photographer and naturalist.

He was known primarily for his extensive collection of detailed macrophotography of Ecuadorian insects and other small animals. Kay was responsible for the re-discovery and documentation of Atelopus coynei, a species of frog previously thought to be extinct. Several species have been named after him, including the orchids Lepanthes kayii and Lepanthopsis kayii. He has been cited in nearly 20,000 academic papers.

After being diagnosed with glioblastoma several months earlier, he died on October 8, 2019.
