= Pristimantis lichenoides =

Conservation status
- Critically Endangered (IUCN 3.1)

Scientific classification
- Kingdom: Animalia
- Phylum: Chordata
- Class: Amphibia
- Order: Anura
- Family: Strabomantidae
- Genus: Pristimantis
- Species: P. lichenoides

Binomial name
- Pristimantis lichenoides (Lynch and Rueda-Almonacid, 1997)
- Pristimantis lichenoides is only known from Samaná in the Cordillera Central of Colombia.

Synonyms
- Eleutherodactylus lichenoides Lynch and Rueda-Almonacid, 1997

Species of amphibian

Pristimantis lichenoides is a species of frogs in the family Strabomantidae. It is endemic to Colombia and is only known from the vicinity of its type locality near Samaná in the Caldas Department, on the eastern slope of the Cordillera Central (Colombian Andes). The specific name lichenoides refers to its lichen-like dorsal coloration as well as its habit of being plastered to rock surfaces, resembling lichens growing on rocks.

== Description ==
Adult males measure 26–31 mm (1.0–1.2 in) and adult females 34–42 mm (1.3–1.7 in) in snout–vent length. The head is as wide as the body and wider than it is long. The snout is rounded in dorsal view but subtruncate in lateral view. The tympanum is small but visible, with its upper edge hidden by the thick supratympanic fold. The fingers have lateral keels and round terminal discs. The lateral keels of the toes coalesce as basal webbing; the toe discs are slightly smaller than those on the fingers. Dorsal skin bears granules. Dorsal coloration is dark green to pale olive with darker mottling and rust or beige scapular and vertebral blotches. Sides of the head have black markings. The lips are burnt yellow with black labial bars. The flanks are creamy yellow with brown reticulation. The throat is yellow while the abdomen is pale yellow to pale brown with brown or grey reticulation.

== Habitat and conservation ==
Pristimantis lichenoides inhabits cloud forests at elevations of 2,000–2,450 m (6,560–8,040 ft) above sea level and is a habitat specialist that is found on top of very humid rocks in stream rapids; juveniles may also occur in the streamside vegetation. Development is direct (i.e., there is no free-living larval stage).

Pristimantis lichenoides is an uncommon species with a very limited known range, though this is partly because of the limited survey effort. It is threatened by habitat loss caused by subsistence wood collecting, pine plantations, and agricultural development. However, it occurs in the Selva de Florencia National Natural Park, a well-protected area.
