= Rio Carauta stubfoot toad =

Conservation status
- Data Deficient (IUCN 3.1)

Scientific classification
- Kingdom: Animalia
- Phylum: Chordata
- Class: Amphibia
- Order: Anura
- Family: Bufonidae
- Genus: Atelopus
- Species: A. carauta

Binomial name
- Atelopus carauta Ruíz-Carranza & Hernández-Camacho, 1978

Species of amphibian

The Rio Carauta stubfoot toad (Atelopus carauta) is a species of toad in the family Bufonidae endemic to Colombia; this anuran is found only within the Northwestern Andean montane forests. Its natural habitats are subtropical or tropical moist montane forests and rivers. The species is threatened by habitat loss.
