= Atelopus galactogaster =

Conservation status
- Data Deficient (IUCN 3.1)

Scientific classification
- Kingdom: Animalia
- Phylum: Chordata
- Class: Amphibia
- Order: Anura
- Family: Bufonidae
- Genus: Atelopus
- Species: A. galactogaster

Binomial name
- Atelopus galactogaster Rivero & Serna, 1993

Species of amphibian

Atelopus galactogaster, the Antado stubfoot toad, is a species of toad in the family Bufonidae endemic to Colombia within the northwestern Andean montane forests. The species' natural habitat is subtropical or tropical moist montane forests.
