= Pristimantis tribulosus =

Conservation status
- Critically Endangered (IUCN 3.1)

Scientific classification
- Kingdom: Animalia
- Phylum: Chordata
- Class: Amphibia
- Order: Anura
- Family: Strabomantidae
- Genus: Pristimantis
- Species: P. tribulosus

Binomial name
- Pristimantis tribulosus (Lynch and Rueda-Almonacid, 1997)
- Pristimantis tribulosus is only known from Samaná in the Cordillera Central of Colombia.

Synonyms
- Eleutherodactylus tribulosus Lynch and Rueda-Almonacid, 1997

Species of amphibian

Pristimantis tribulosus is a species of frog in the family Strabomantidae. It is endemic to Colombia and is only known from the vicinity of its type locality near Samaná in the Caldas Department, on the eastern slope of the Cordillera Central (Colombian Andes). The specific name tribulosus, meaning "thorny", refers to the numerous tubercles that cover the upper surfaces of this species.

== Description ==
Adult females—based on only two specimens, including the holotype—measure 26.5 mm (1.0 in) in snout–vent length (SVL). The only male known at the time of the species description was a juvenile measuring 11.6 mm (0.5 in) SVL. The head is slightly narrower than the body and longer than it is wide. The snout is long, acuminate in dorsal view and protruding in lateral view. The tympanum is vertically elongated. The supratympanic fold is obsolete. The fingers are long and slender and have thin lateral keels and round terminal discs. The toes are also long and slender but lack lateral keels; the toe discs are smaller than those on the fingers. Dorsal skin is finely shagreen with heavy paravertebral folds and bears numerous conical tubercles. Dorsal coloration is moss green with a diffuse brown pattern. The flanks are uniformly green. The limbs have reddish-brown bands. The throat and the anterior part of the abdomen are pale cream, turning very pale yellow posteriorly.

== Habitat and conservation ==
Pristimantis tribulosus inhabits cloud forests at elevations of 1,900–2,400 m (6,200–7,900 ft) above sea level. It is a nocturnal frog usually found on low vegetation in dense, intact forest (although the holotype was collected from secondary forest). Development is direct (i.e., there is no free-living larval stage).

Pristimantis tribulosus is a rare species only known from single forest fragment, though this is partly because of the limited survey effort. It is threatened by habitat loss caused by subsistence wood collecting, pine plantations, and agricultural development. However, it occurs in the Selva de Florencia National Natural Park, a well protected-area.
