= Leptodactylus magistris =

Teachers' frog

Conservation status
- Critically Endangered (IUCN 3.1)

Scientific classification
- Kingdom: Animalia
- Phylum: Chordata
- Class: Amphibia
- Order: Anura
- Family: Leptodactylidae
- Genus: Leptodactylus
- Species: L. magistris

Binomial name
- Leptodactylus magistris Mijares-Urrutia, 1997

Species of frog

The Teachers' frog or Socopo robber-frog (Leptodactylus magistris) is a species of frog in the family Leptodactylidae. It is endemic to Venezuela.

== Habitat ==
This terrestrial frog is active during the day. Scientists know the frog exclusively from the exactly type locality: Cerro Socopó in Estado Falcón. The frog lives in small streams and ponds. Scientists have seen it 1250 meters above sea level.

There are protected areas near the type locality, including Estação Ecológica do Grão Pará and Reserva Extrativista do Rio Cajari.

== Reproduction ==
This frog makes a foam nest for its eggs. It makes this nest in ponds. The tadpoles develop in water.

== Threats ==
The IUCN classifies this frog is critically endangered. It suffers from habitat loss associated with forest conversion to grassland, grazing areas, and farms, for example small coffee farms. Climate change could also harm this frog.
