= Pristimantis duellmani =

Conservation status
- Vulnerable (IUCN 3.1)

Scientific classification
- Kingdom: Animalia
- Phylum: Chordata
- Class: Amphibia
- Order: Anura
- Clade: Brachycephaloidea
- Family: Craugastoridae
- Genus: Pristimantis
- Species: P. duellmani

Binomial name
- Pristimantis duellmani (Lynch, 1980)

Synonyms
- Eleutherodactylus duellmani Lynch, 1980

Species of frog

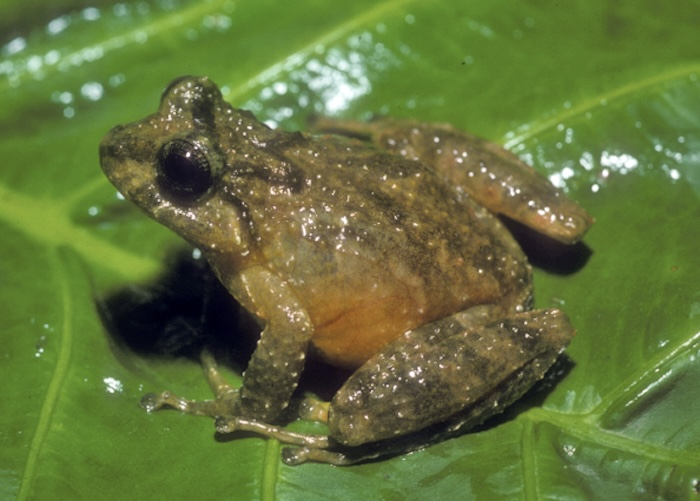

Pristimantis duellmani is a species of frog in the family Strabomantidae. It is found in Colombia and Ecuador. Its natural habitats are tropical moist montane forests and rivers. It is threatened by habitat loss.
