= Pristimantis caprifer =

Conservation status
- Critically Endangered (IUCN 3.1)

Scientific classification
- Kingdom: Animalia
- Phylum: Chordata
- Class: Amphibia
- Order: Anura
- Clade: Brachycephaloidea
- Family: Craugastoridae
- Genus: Pristimantis
- Species: P. caprifer

Binomial name
- Pristimantis caprifer (Lynch, 1977)

Synonyms
- Eleutherodactylus caprifer Lynch, 1977

Species of amphibian

Pristimantis caprifer is a species of frog in the family Strabomantidae. It is found in Colombia and Ecuador. Its natural habitats are tropical moist lowland forests, rivers, and heavily degraded former forest. It is threatened by habitat loss.
