= Atelopus pastuso =

Conservation status
- Critically endangered, possibly extinct (IUCN 3.1)

Scientific classification
- Kingdom: Animalia
- Phylum: Chordata
- Class: Amphibia
- Order: Anura
- Family: Bufonidae
- Genus: Atelopus
- Species: A. pastuso

Binomial name
- Atelopus pastuso Coloma, Duellman, Almendáriz, Ron, Terán-Valdez & Guayasamin, 2010

Species of amphibian

Atelopus pastuso, commonly known as the Pastuso Harlequin Frog, is a species of frog in the family Bufonidae. It has not been seen since 1993, and is possibly extinct.

== Taxonomy ==
Atelopus pastuso was described in 2010. The specific name pastuso is from a Spanish word for inhabitants of the Pasto region of southern Colombia and northern Ecuador.

== Description ==
Atelopus pastuso is a medium-sized member of its genus, with males being an average of 31.82 millimetres (1.253 in) long and females being larger at an average of 38.68 millimetres (1.523 in). Males and females also differ in that females have long, slender limbs, while males have much shorter and stouter ones. The color of their dorsal side ranges from a bright green, to a grayish color, to nearly black.

== Habitat and Distribution ==
The range of Atelopus pastuso extends from Nariño Department in southern Colombia and Imbabura Province in northern Ecuador. They inhabit the páramo, and are terrestrial.

== Diet ==
Atelopus pastuso eats both vegetation and insects.

== History ==
Atelopus pastuso was once a common species in its locality, but it experienced a dramatic decline in the past several decades. The last individuals in Colombia were seen on November 16, 1982. The last living individuals in Ecuador were seen on June 29, 1993. Extensive searches since then have failed to turn up any individuals. In 2010, Atelopus pastuso was classed as a new species, and was declared Critically Endangered and possibly extinct by the IUCN.

Disease may have played a role in the species' decline. In Ecuador, several unhealthy and deceased individuals were seen before the disappearance of Atelopus pastuso. In 2001, three specimens were examined, and all tested positive for chytridiomycosis. It's believed that climate change and habitat loss could have also led to Atelopus pastuso's decline.
