= Atelopus lynchi =

Conservation status
- Critically endangered, possibly extinct (IUCN 3.1)

Scientific classification
- Kingdom: Animalia
- Phylum: Chordata
- Class: Amphibia
- Order: Anura
- Family: Bufonidae
- Genus: Atelopus
- Species: A. lynchi

Binomial name
- Atelopus lynchi Cannatella, 1981

Species of amphibian

Atelopus lynchi, also known as Lynch's stubfoot toad or Lynch's harlequin frog, is a species of toad in the family Bufonidae. It occurs in northern Ecuador (Carchi) and in southern Colombia (Nariño, Cauca, and possibly Valle del Cauca Department, the last one is in doubt). It occurs on the Pacific slope of the Cordillera Occidental, as the westernmost ranges of the Andes are known in both Colombia and in Ecuador. Prior to its description, it was confused with Atelopus longirostris.

== Etymology ==
The specific name lynchi honors John D. Lynch, an American herpetologist and the collector of the holotype.

== Description ==
Adult males measure 35–41 mm (1.4–1.6 in) and adult females about 50 mm (2.0 in) in snout–vent length. The head is longer than it is wide and is narrower than the body. The snout is long and protruding. No tympanum is present. The fingers have basal webbing, but no fringes. The toes are webbed. The digits have distinct pads. The coloration is rather undistinguished (in contrast to its often colorful congeners): dorsal coloration is brown with indistinct dull yellow markings and the venter is dull blue-gray. The iris is black with pale green area surrounding the pupil.

== Habitat and conservation ==
Atelopus lynchi lives on the border between lowland and montane rainforest to montane rainforest to cloud forest at elevations of 800–1,410 m (2,620–4,630 ft) above sea level. It is terrestrial, but presumably reproduces in rivers. The type series was collected at night by streams, perched on leaves.

Atelopus lynchi was last observed in Ecuador in 1984. IUCN does not recognize records from Colombia and has assessed the species as being possibly extinct. Threats to it include deforestation for agricultural development, logging, and human settlement, as well as pollution resulting from the fumigation of illegal crops. Its disappearance after 1984 is also consistent with chytridiomycosis.
