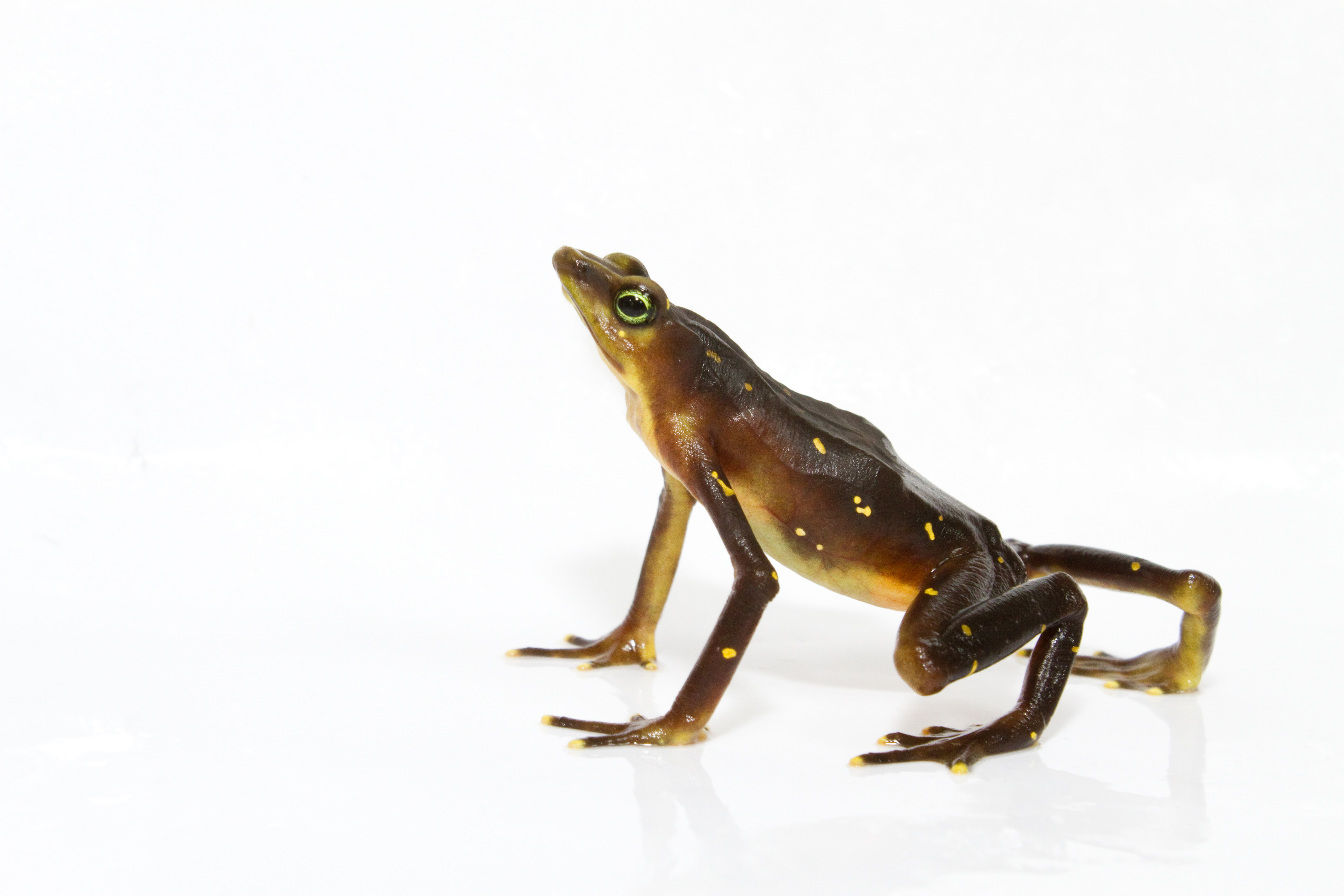

Conservation status
- Critically Endangered (IUCN 3.1)

Scientific classification
- Kingdom: Animalia
- Phylum: Chordata
- Class: Amphibia
- Order: Anura
- Family: Bufonidae
- Genus: Atelopus
- Species: A. glyphus

Binomial name
- Atelopus glyphus Dunn, 1931

= Atelopus glyphus =

Species of amphibian

Atelopus glyphus, the Pirri harlequin frog or Pirri Range stubfoot toad, is a species of toad in the family Bufonidae found in Colombia and Panama within the Northwestern Andean montane forests. Its natural habitats are subtropical or tropical moist montane forests and rivers.

== Morphology and behaviour ==
This species is terrestrial, and breeds in forest streams. The reproductive biology is not well-known, but other Atelopus species are known to attach their eggs to the undersides of rocks in swift-moving streams during dry seasons when the water level is low. The eggs are laid in strings, and the larvae develop as the wet season begins. All Atelopus tadpoles have large ventral suckers, allowing them to hang on to rocks even in torrents.

== Conservation ==
The biggest threat to this and other, similar species is chytridiomycosis. The disease has affected many other species of Atelopus, particularly those associated with montane streams. This toad lives in two protected areas in Panama and Colombia. This guarantees some suitable habitat, but does not protect it from the chytrid fungus.

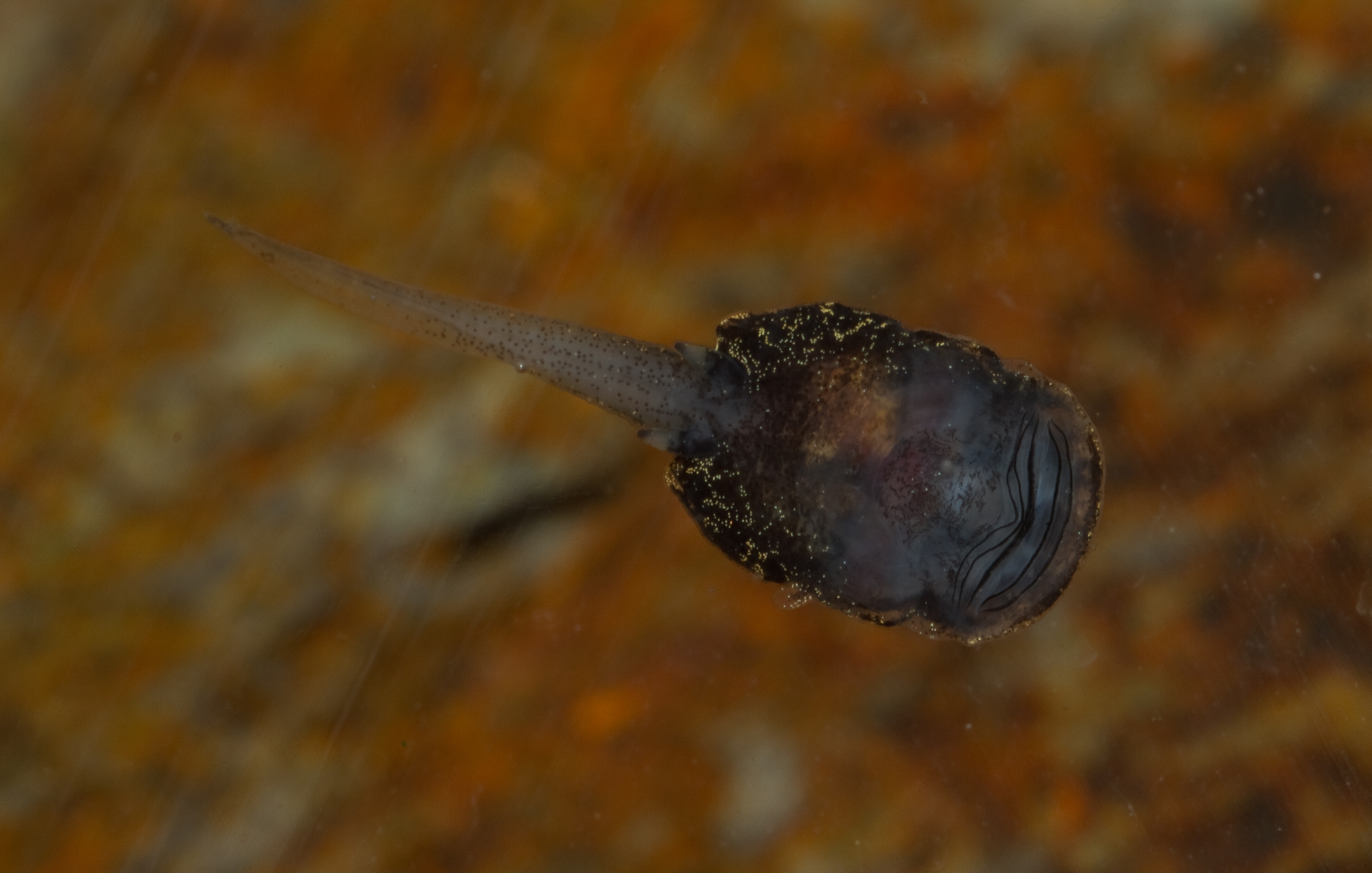
Tadpole

It is also threatened by habitat loss, urbanization, climate change, pesticides, and intensified agriculture, including grazing. Atelopus happens to be the most threatened clade of amphibians, where 60 of the 85 described species are classified as critically endangered by the IUCN. In addition, at least 30 known species are extinct. Of the surviving species, and those on which enough data exist to evaluate population trends, 81% have population sizes reduced by at least half from historical levels. The higher-elevation species, those living at or above 1,000 metres (3,300 ft), have been hit the worst, with 75% having disappeared entirely.
