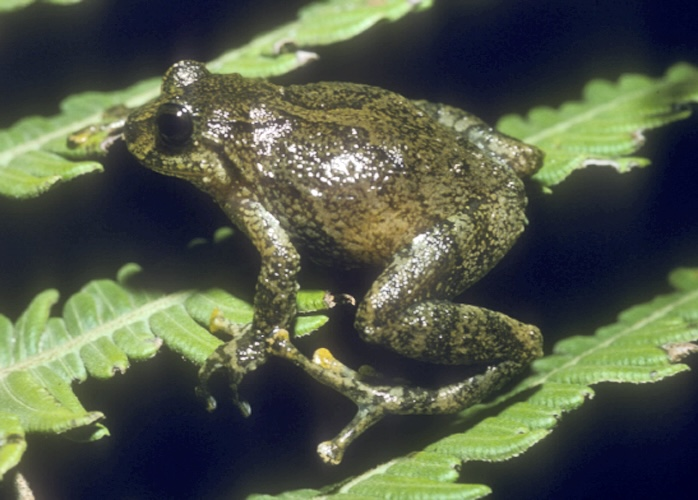

Conservation status
- Critically Endangered (IUCN 3.1)

Scientific classification
- Kingdom: Animalia
- Phylum: Chordata
- Class: Amphibia
- Order: Anura
- Clade: Brachycephaloidea
- Family: Craugastoridae
- Genus: Pristimantis
- Species: P. pugnax

Binomial name
- Pristimantis pugnax (Lynch, 1973)

Synonyms
- Eleutherodactylus pugnax Lynch, 1973

= Pristimantis pugnax =

Species of frog

Pristimantis pugnax is a species of frog in the family Strabomantidae. It is found in Colombia and Ecuador. Its natural habitats are tropical moist montane forests and rivers. It is threatened by habitat loss.
