= Pristimantis phragmipleuron =

Conservation status
- Critically endangered, possibly extinct (IUCN 3.1)

Scientific classification
- Kingdom: Animalia
- Phylum: Chordata
- Class: Amphibia
- Order: Anura
- Clade: Brachycephaloidea
- Family: Craugastoridae
- Genus: Pristimantis
- Species: P. phragmipleuron

Binomial name
- Pristimantis phragmipleuron (Rivero & Serna, 1988)

Synonyms
- Eleutherodactylus phragmipleuron Rivero & Serna, 1988 "1987"

Species of frog

Pristimantis phragmipleuron is a species of frog in the family Strabomantidae. It is endemic to Colombia where it is known only from its type locality, Pan de Azúcar, Cordillera Central, in the Antioquia Department. Its natural habitat is tropical cloud forest. It is a rare species threatened by habitat loss; the habitat at the type locality has badly suffered from human settlement and the collection of firewood.
