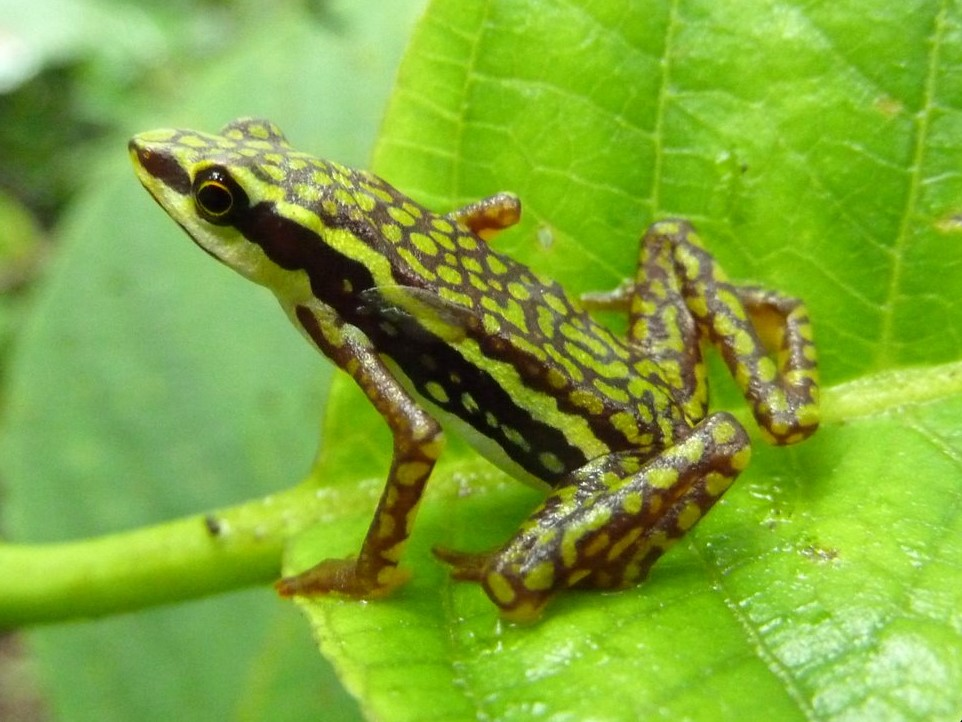

Conservation status
- Critically Endangered (IUCN 3.1)

Scientific classification
- Kingdom: Animalia
- Phylum: Chordata
- Class: Amphibia
- Order: Anura
- Family: Bufonidae
- Genus: Atelopus
- Species: A. coynei

Binomial name
- Atelopus coynei Miyata, 1980

= Atelopus coynei =

Species of amphibian

Atelopus coynei, the Rio Faisanes stubfoot toad, is a species of toad in the family Bufonidae endemic to Ecuador. Its natural habitats are subtropical or tropical moist lowland forests, subtropical or tropical moist montane forests, and rivers. It is threatened by habitat loss.

== Description ==
Atelopus coynei can be differentiated from other similar species by its ventral patterning, thick fleshy finger webbing that covers its first finger, and from its long hind limbs that cause its heels to overlap when the legs are positioned perpendicular to the body (Miyata 1980).

== Range and habitat ==
Atelopus coynei formerly ranged across the northwestern Andes foothills in Carchi, Imbabura, Pichincha and Santo Domingo provinces of Ecuador, where it lives along stream banks in primary and secondary montane forest between 500 and 2,000 meters elevation.

It currently found in only four disjunct areas in Carchi Province, including two locations in Río Chinambi and the Dracula Reserve, a private protected conservation area in Carchi Province, north-western Ecuador, which was established through the effort of the Rainforest Trust, EcoMinga Foundation, and Orchid Conservation Alliance.

Adults are diurnal, active on rainy days on the rocky banks of river and streams. They rest at night on the leaves of streamside vegetation. They lay eggs on rocks in flowing streams. Tadpoles are typical of Atelopus, remaining attached to rocks.

== Conservation ==
The conservation status of Atelopus coynei is assessed as critically endangered. It has a very small population which is continually declining from loss and degradation of its habitat, chiefly from agricultural activities. The population is estimated at fewer than 250 mature individuals.

== Naming ==
It was named after evolutionary biologist Jerry Coyne, who collected the holotype in a swamp on a frogging trip to western Ecuador as a student in the late 1970s. It was thought to be extinct for many years, but was observed and photographed on February 7, 2012, by photographer Andreas Kay.

== Speciation ==
The ancestral stock of the genus Atelopus was thought to be present in South America prior to the Tertiary era. Species within the genus likely adapted to riparian habitats prior to the Andean uplift in the Cretaceous and Early Tertiary. As Andean uplift occurred, creating a more montane environment, it lifted the species and speciation resulted for the medium- to higher-altitude species members including A. coynei; this higher-altitude adaptation likely reflected the ensuing vegetation and climate.
