= Atelopus nocturnus =

Conservation status
- Critically Endangered (IUCN 3.1)

Scientific classification
- Kingdom: Animalia
- Phylum: Chordata
- Class: Amphibia
- Order: Anura
- Family: Bufonidae
- Genus: Atelopus
- Species: A. nocturnus

Binomial name
- Atelopus nocturnus Bravo-Valencia and Rivera-Correa, 2011
- Atelopus nocturnus is only known from Anorí in the Colombian Andes.

Species of amphibian

Atelopus nocturnus, also known as the nocturnal harlequin toad, is a species of frog in the family Bufonidae. It is endemic to Antioquia, Colombia, and only known from its type locality in Anorí, in the northern Cordillera Central (Colombian Andes). The specific name nocturnus refers to the nocturnality of this species, which is unusual among Atelopus.

== Description ==
Adult males measure 20–25 mm (0.8–1.0 in) and adult females 33–34 mm (1.3–1.3 in) in snout–vent length. The head is longer than it is broad. The snout is acuminate. No tympanum is externally visible, but a prominent supratympanic crest is present. The forearms are relatively short. The fingers have basal webbing and round pads at their tips. The toes are webbed. Dorsal coloration varies from pale brown to dark reddish brown. The flanks are brown to orange. Males have white to yellowish cream bellies with dark brown markings, whereas females have bright orange bellies. The throat, chest, belly, and ventral surfaces of limbs are bright orange. The iris is bright yellow with brown spots and fine black reticulations.

== Habitat and conservation ==
Atelopus nocturnus is known from a remnant secondary very humid pre-montane forest at elevations of 1,670–1,875 m (5,479–6,152 ft) above sea level. The site is characterized by an abundance of arboreal ferns, bromeliads, and other epiphytes. Atelopus nocturnus were collected from vegetation up to 1 meter above the ground near a stream and were active at night – all but one specimen were captured at night. Although the larval habitat is not known, it is likely that the larvae develop in streams.

Atelopus nocturnus was first discovered in 2003 and collected again in 2007. There are no further observations, despite search efforts. The population is likely to be very small. It is potentially threatened by chytridiomycosis. As the known distribution is within two contiguous protected areas, Arrierito Antioqueño ProAves Reserve and La Forzosa Reserve, habitat loss is not a current threat. However, being only known from one location, the population is vulnerable to stochastic events. Porce III Dam and Porce IV Dam are potential threats in the nearby area.
