= Atelopus pachydermus =

Conservation status
- Critically Endangered (IUCN 3.1)

Scientific classification
- Kingdom: Animalia
- Phylum: Chordata
- Class: Amphibia
- Order: Anura
- Family: Bufonidae
- Genus: Atelopus
- Species: A. pachydermus

Binomial name
- Atelopus pachydermus (Schmidt, 1857)

Synonyms
- Phirix pachydermus Schmidt, 1857; Phryniscus pachydermus (Schmidt, 1857)

Species of amphibian

Atelopus pachydermus is a species of toad in the family Bufonidae. It is found in the Andes of northern Peru (Amazonas and Cajamarca Regions) and southern Ecuador (Zamora-Chinchipe Province). Records from Colombia reflect the vagueness of the stated type locality, "Neu-Granada", encompassing territory part of several present-day countries. Other records outside the current range refer to other species. The most recent record of this very rare and possibly extinct species is from around 1995. However, there is a need to reassess the status of this species because of confusion with Atelopus podocarpus.

== Etymology ==
The specific name pachydermus is Greek and mean "thick skin". Common name Schmidt's stubfoot toad has been coined for this species, in reference to Eduard Oscar Schmidt who described the species. An alternative common name is Oyacachi jambato toad.

== Description ==
Adult males measure 44–56 mm (1.7–2.2 in) and adult females, based on two specimens only, 56–62 mm (2.2–2.4 in) in snout–vent length. The snout is acuminate. The tympanic membrane is absent. The fingers have no webbing whereas the toes are webbed. The dorsum is covered by widely scattered or dense well-defined, rounded warts. The dorsum is yellow and has a dark brown pattern of marks, blotches and/or lines. The venter is white, sometimes orange or red.

== Habitat and conservation ==
Atelopus pachydermus occurs near streams in páramo and sub-páramo at an elevation of about 2,600 m (8,500 ft) above sea level. Breeding takes place in streams, and the species seems to depend on a permanent source of water.

In Peru, Atelopus pachydermus was last recorded in 1994 or 1995 in the Cutervo National Park. The status of this population is unknown, but extensive agricultural activity is taking place within the park. In Ecuador, the species has been recorded only once in 1985, and later surveys has revealed no new observations. However, this record may be in error. Threats to this species are habitat loss, and possibly climate change and chytridiomycosis.
