= Pristimantis simonbolivari =

Conservation status
- Critically Endangered (IUCN 3.1)

Scientific classification
- Kingdom: Animalia
- Phylum: Chordata
- Class: Amphibia
- Order: Anura
- Family: Strabomantidae
- Genus: Pristimantis
- Species: P. simonbolivari

Binomial name
- Pristimantis simonbolivari (Wiens and Coloma, 1992)

Synonyms
- Eleutherodactylus simonbolivari Wiens and Coloma, 1992

Species of frog

Pristimantis simonbolivari is a species of frog in the family Strabomantidae. It is endemic to Ecuador and known only from the region of its type locality, Cashca Totoras, Cordillera Occidental, in the Bolívar Province (central Ecuador). The specific name simonbolivari honors Simón Bolívar. Common name Simon's ground frog has been proposed for it.

== Description ==
Adult males measure 16–19.2 mm (0.6–0.8 in) and adult females 18.5–22 mm (0.7–0.9 in) in snout–vent length. The snout is short. The tympanum is visible but indistinct; no supratympanic fold is present. The finger tips are dilated into small pads that are less developed in the inner two fingers. The toe tips have small discs. No toe webbing or lateral fringes are present. Dorsal coloration is dark brown (females, sometimes with reddish tone) or reddish brown with darker spots (males). The venter is orange in males but dark brown to black with lighter spots in females. The iris is gray with a median horizontal brown streak.

== Habitat and conservation ==
Pristimantis simonbolivari inhabits humid montane forest and forest edge at 3,000–3,300 m (9,800–10,800 ft) above sea level. Specimens have been found in leaf litter, under rotten logs, under moss growing on logs, and under rocks. It is locally abundant. It is threatened by habitat loss and degradation caused by agriculture and logging.
