= Pristimantis diogenes =

Conservation status
- Critically Endangered (IUCN 3.1)

Scientific classification
- Kingdom: Animalia
- Phylum: Chordata
- Class: Amphibia
- Order: Anura
- Clade: Brachycephaloidea
- Family: Craugastoridae
- Genus: Pristimantis
- Species: P. diogenes

Binomial name
- Pristimantis diogenes (Lynch & Ruíz-Carranza, 1996)

Synonyms
- Eleutherodactylus diogenes Lynch & Ruíz-Carranza, 1996

Species of frog

Pristimantis diogenes is a species of frog in the family Strabomantidae. It is endemic to Colombia. Its natural habitats are tropical moist montane forests and rivers.
