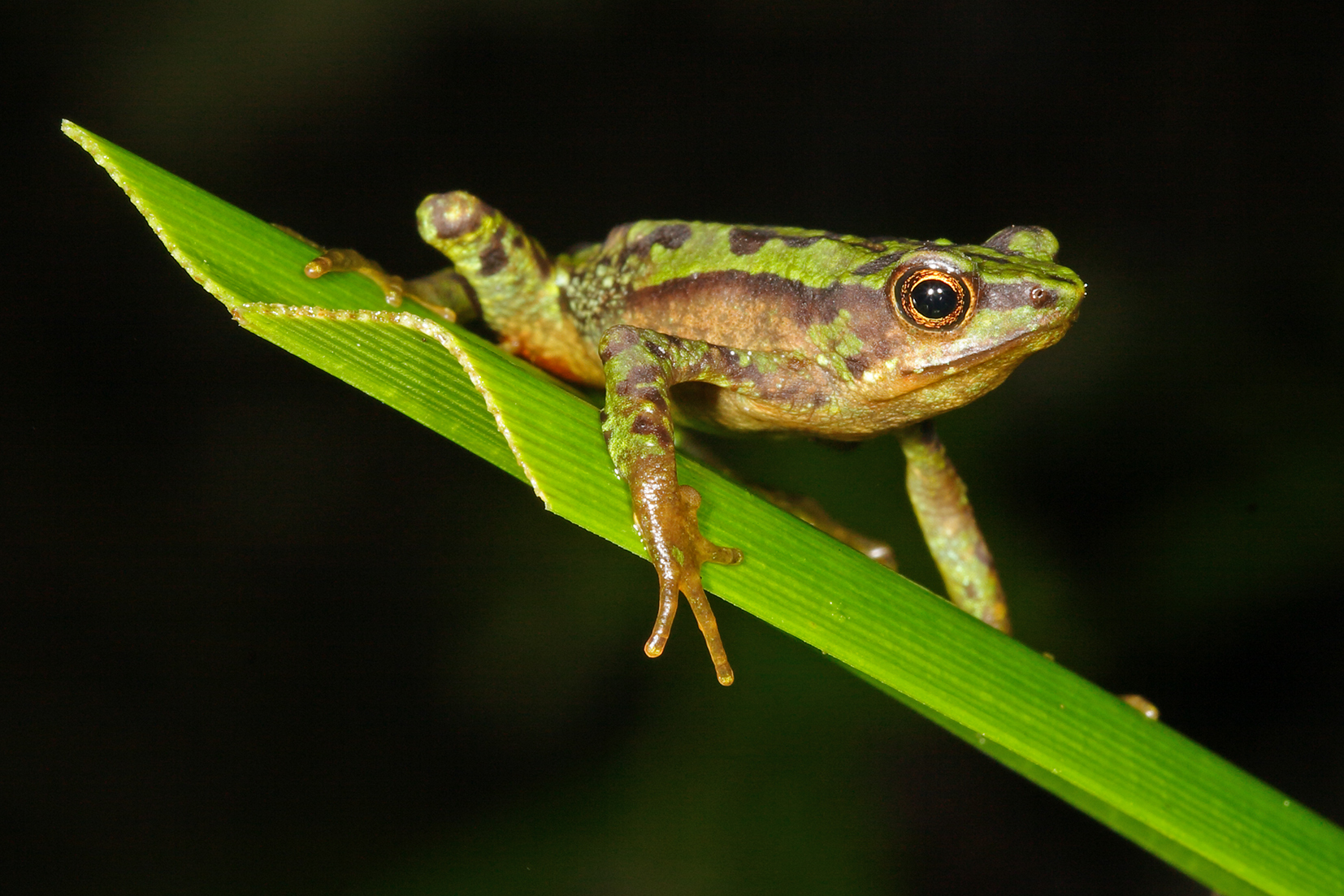
- Atelopus palmatus in Morona-Santiago, Ecuador

Conservation status
- Critically Endangered (IUCN 3.1)

Scientific classification
- Kingdom: Animalia
- Phylum: Chordata
- Class: Amphibia
- Order: Anura
- Family: Bufonidae
- Genus: Atelopus
- Species: A. palmatus

Binomial name
- Atelopus palmatus Andersson, 1945

= Atelopus palmatus =

Species of amphibian

Atelopus palmatus (common name: Andersson's stubfoot toad) is a species of toad in the family Bufonidae. It is endemic to the Cordillera Oriental of eastern Ecuador and is known from the Napo and Pastaza Provinces at elevations of 1,150–1,740 m (3,770–5,710 ft) above sea level. Its type locality is "Rio Pastaza".

== Description ==
Males measure 20–21 mm (0.79–0.83 in) and females 28–31 mm (1.1–1.2 in) in snout–vent length.

== Habitat and conservation ==
Its natural habitats are humid montane forests. It is a diurnal species. Males have been observed during the night on dry leaves by a marsh, and during the day between rocks and sand by water. A female has been observed during the day in flooded leaf litter on a swamp. Gravid females carrying about 80 eggs have been found between March and July.

It is most threatened by the fungal infectious disease chytridiomycosis which causes dramatic decline and affects other species of its genus. Other threats include habitat loss through agriculture (both crops and livestock), logging, planned mining and wood plantations.
