= Atelopus oxyrhynchus =

Conservation status
- Critically Endangered (IUCN 3.1)

Scientific classification
- Kingdom: Animalia
- Phylum: Chordata
- Class: Amphibia
- Order: Anura
- Family: Bufonidae
- Genus: Atelopus
- Species: A. oxyrhynchus

Binomial name
- Atelopus oxyrhynchus Boulenger, 1903

Species of amphibian

Atelopus oxyrhynchus, called the Merida harlequin toad, is a species of toad in the family Bufonidae. It is endemic to Venezuela. Its natural habitats are subtropical or tropical moist montane forests, rivers, and intermittent rivers. It is threatened by habitat loss.

A. oxyrhynchus contains tetrodotoxin (TTX), a potent neurotoxin that induces muscle paralysis and/or death. Unlike Atelopus varius, which do not retain TTX when raised in captivity and thus acquires TTX exogenously, A. oxyrhynchus maintains its toxicity when raised in captivity. This has also been shown for the rough-skinned newt, Taricha granulosa. These organisms raise questions about the source of TTX, as the most supported hypothesis for TTX toxicity in other animals is an exogenous origin, either through dietary uptake or bacterial symbiosis.
