= Atelopus farci =

Conservation status
- Critically Endangered (IUCN 3.1)

Scientific classification
- Kingdom: Animalia
- Phylum: Chordata
- Class: Amphibia
- Order: Anura
- Family: Bufonidae
- Genus: Atelopus
- Species: A. farci

Binomial name
- Atelopus farci Lynch, 1993

Species of amphibian

Atelopus farci, the forest stubfoot toad, is a species of toad in the family Bufonidae. It is endemic to Colombia and only known from its type locality, Granjas del Padre Luna, in Albán, Cundinamarca, on the western flank of the Cordillera Oriental at about 2,100 m (6,900 ft) above sea level. Its natural habitat is cloud forest where it lives in streams.

The only known population has undergone a dramatic decline. Once abundant, surveys in 2002–2003 recovered only one tadpole. The species is threatened by both chytridiomycosis and habitat loss. The species was named after the Colombian rebel group FARC in recognition of the fact that their activities had the indirect effect of providing protection for the animal's habitat and not, as the author makes clear, for the group's political agenda.
