= Atelopus orcesi =

Conservation status
- Critically Endangered (IUCN 3.1)

Scientific classification
- Kingdom: Animalia
- Phylum: Chordata
- Class: Amphibia
- Order: Anura
- Family: Bufonidae
- Genus: Atelopus
- Species: A. orcesi

Binomial name
- Atelopus orcesi Coloma, Duellman, Almendáriz, Ron, Terán-Valdez & Guayasamin, 2010

Species of amphibian

Atelopus orcesi (Common Name: Orces's Harlequin Frog) is a species of frog in the family Bufonidae. It has not been seen since 1988 and is possibly extinct.

== Taxonomy ==
Atelopus orcesi was first described in 2010. Its specific epithet honors Gustavo Edmundo Orcés Villagómez, a pioneering Ecuadoran zoologist.

== Description ==
Atelopus orcesi is a medium-sized member of its genus, with males averaging 30mm in length and females averaging 40mm. Males and females can also be distinguished by the longer, more slender forelegs that the females possess and the distinct rows of warts down the sides of the males. Both sexes have distinct X-shaped marks on the back of their heads.

== Habitat and Distribution ==
The species is only known from its type locality, in the eastern portion of Cordillera Occidental (Ecuador), Sucumbíos Province, Ecuador. Its preferred habitat consists of montane cloud forest.

== History and Conservation ==
The only known specimens of Atelopus orcesi were collected in May of 1988 by Ana María Velasco. Despite surveys, no further individuals have been seen, including an intensive survey at the species' type locality in 2009. It's believed that its main threats are climate change and diseases. Chytridiomycosis is not known to have played a role in the population decline of Atelopus orcesi. Still, it has caused other amphibian populations in Ecuador to decrease dramatically. In 2018, the IUCN listed the species as Critically Endangered and possibly extinct.
