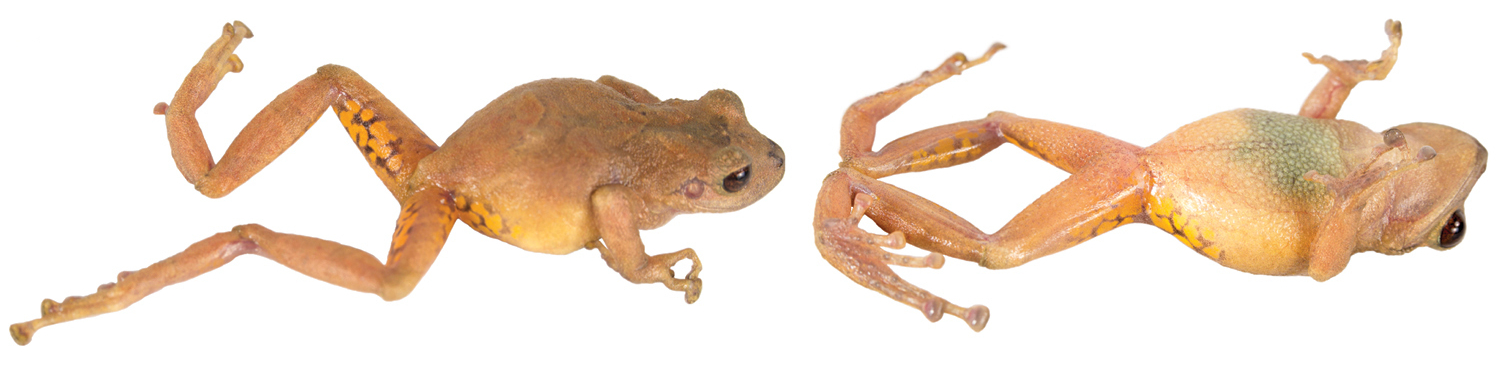

Conservation status
- Critically Endangered (IUCN 3.1)

Scientific classification
- Kingdom: Animalia
- Phylum: Chordata
- Class: Amphibia
- Order: Anura
- Clade: Brachycephaloidea
- Family: Craugastoridae
- Genus: Pristimantis
- Species: P. phoxocephalus

Binomial name
- Pristimantis phoxocephalus (Lynch, 1979)

Synonyms
- Eleutherodactylus phoxocephalus Lynch, 1979

= Pristimantis phoxocephalus =

Species of frog

Pristimantis phoxocephalus is a species of frog in the family Strabomantidae. It is found in Ecuador and Peru. Its natural habitats are tropical moist montane forests, high-altitude shrubland, rural gardens, and heavily degraded former forest. It is threatened by habitat loss.
