= Rhinella rostrata =

Mesopotamia beaked toad

Conservation status
- Critically endangered, possibly extinct (IUCN 3.1)

Scientific classification
- Kingdom: Animalia
- Phylum: Chordata
- Class: Amphibia
- Order: Anura
- Family: Bufonidae
- Genus: Rhinella
- Species: R. rostrata

Binomial name
- Rhinella rostrata (Noble, 1920)

Synonyms
- Bufo rostratus Noble, 1920; Rhamphophryne rostratus (Noble, 1920)

Species of amphibian

Rhinella rostrata, also known as the Mesopotamia beaked toad, is a species of toad endemic to Colombia. It is only known from its type locality near the village of Mesopotamia, on the western slope of the Cordillera Occidental in the south of the Antioquia Department.

Rhinella rostrata is only known from two specimens collected in 1914. Targeted searches of the type locality since then have not found it, and it is possible that it is now extinct. It was one of the "Top Ten Most Wanted" species in the Search for Lost Frogs campaign.
