= Pristimantis albericoi =

Conservation status
- Critically endangered, possibly extinct (IUCN 3.1)

Scientific classification
- Kingdom: Animalia
- Phylum: Chordata
- Class: Amphibia
- Order: Anura
- Clade: Brachycephaloidea
- Family: Craugastoridae
- Genus: Pristimantis
- Species: P. albericoi

Binomial name
- Pristimantis albericoi (Lynch & Ruíz-Carranza, 1996)

Synonyms
- Eleutherodactylus albericoi Lynch & Ruíz-Carranza, 1996

Species of frog

Pristimantis albericoi is a species of frog in the family Strabomantidae. It is endemic to Colombia. Its natural habitats are tropical moist lowland forests and rivers. It is threatened by habitat loss.
