= Atelopus podocarpus =

Conservation status
- Critically Endangered (IUCN 3.1)

Scientific classification
- Kingdom: Animalia
- Phylum: Chordata
- Class: Amphibia
- Order: Anura
- Family: Bufonidae
- Genus: Atelopus
- Species: A. podocarpus

Binomial name
- Atelopus podocarpus Coloma, Duellman, Almendáriz, Ron, Terán-Valdez & Guayasamin, 2010

Species of amphibian

Atelopus podocarpus is a species of frog in the family Bufonidae. It has not been seen since 1994, and is believed to be possibly extinct.

== Taxonomy ==
Atelopus podocarpus was described in 2010. The specific name comes from Podocarpus National Park, where the species used to be found.

== Description ==
Male Atelopus podocarpus range from 35 to 40 mm long, while females are larger, ranging from 40 to 50 mm long. They have short hind limbs, and a dark-colored dorsal surface.

== Habitat and Distribution ==
Atelopus podocarpus is known from páramos in southern Ecuador and northern Peru. They've been found in scrubland and dirt banks, hiding under rocks during the day.

== History ==
Atelopus podocarpus experienced a massive decline in population towards the end of the 20th century. The last individual in Peru was seen on July 20, 1980. In Ecuador, the last living individual was seen on December 1, 1994. It was collected in unhealthy condition, and died while being transported. Several surveys conducted since have failed to locate any more individuals, and it is currently listed as Critically Endangered and possibly extinct. It's believed that disease and habitat loss led to the species' decline.
