= Pristimantis mars =

Conservation status
- Critically Endangered (IUCN 3.1)

Scientific classification
- Kingdom: Animalia
- Phylum: Chordata
- Class: Amphibia
- Order: Anura
- Clade: Brachycephaloidea
- Family: Craugastoridae
- Genus: Pristimantis
- Species: P. mars

Binomial name
- Pristimantis mars (Lynch & Ruíz-Carranza, 1996)

Synonyms
- Eleutherodactylus mars Lynch & Ruíz-Carranza, 1996

Species of Pristimantis frog

Pristimantis mars is a species of frog in the family Strabomantidae. It is endemic to the Risaralda Department of Colombia, in the Cordillera Occidental. Its natural habitat is tropical moist montane forests. It is threatened by habitat loss.
