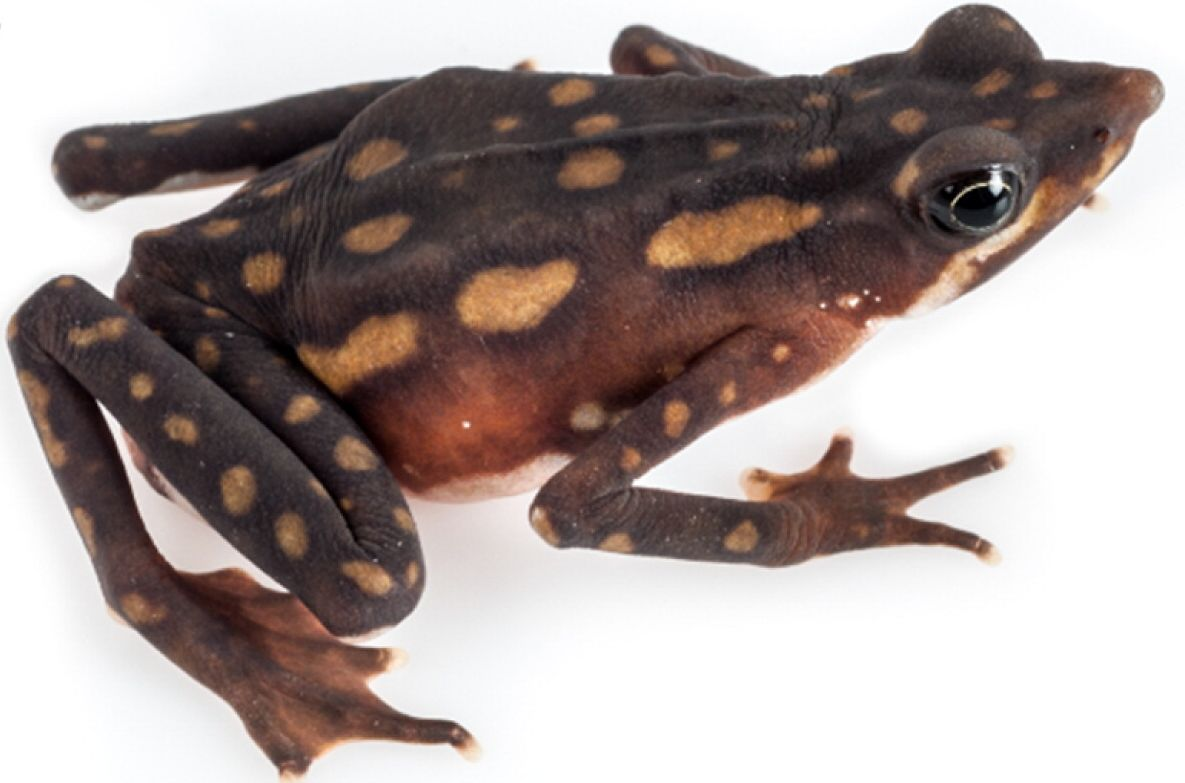
- Female Atelopus longirostris from Junín, Ecuador

Conservation status
- Critically Endangered (IUCN 3.1)

Scientific classification
- Kingdom: Animalia
- Phylum: Chordata
- Class: Amphibia
- Order: Anura
- Family: Bufonidae
- Genus: Atelopus
- Species: A. longirostris

Binomial name
- Atelopus longirostris Cope, 1868

Synonyms
- Phryniscus longirostris (Cope, 1868); Phryniscus boussingaulti Thominot, 1889; Atelopus longirostris marmorata Werner, 1901

= Atelopus longirostris =

Species of amphibian

Atelopus longirostris is a species of harlequin frog, a member of the family of true toads (Bufonidae). It has been recorded only in northern Ecuador. Records from Colombia probably represent different species. Once listed as extinct by the IUCN, it was rediscovered in 2016 after more than two decade with no sightings.

== Names ==
The scientific name of this species means "long-snout" and the species has been named in Spanish as the jambato hocicudo (long-snouted jambato). Common names longnose stubfoot toad, scrawny stubfoot-toad, and longnose sharlequin frog have been coined for it.

== Taxonomy and systematics ==
Atelopus longirostris was described by Edward Drinker Cope in 1868 based on a specimen collected by James Orton and which now appears to be lost. The type locality was stated as "Valley of Quito", but this is presumed to be erroneous.

Arteaga and colleagues (2013) state that populations from Carchi and Esmeraldas Provinces need taxonomic revision and exclude them from the range of this species.

== Description ==
Adult males measure 30–35 mm (1.2–1.4 in) and females 41–47 mm (1.6–1.9 in) in snout–vent length. However, Tapia and colleagues report two smaller adult females, measuring 37 and 39 mm (1.5 and 1.5 in) SVL. Atelopus longirostris has a slender body with long limbs. The snout is pronounced and has a comparatively sharp point. The fingers are fleshy and have some basal webbing; the toes are more heavily webbed. The dorsum is brown with yellow or cream rounded spots. The flanks are dark brown or black. The venter is whitish with some brown suffusion in the throat and chest.

== Status and rediscovery ==
Previously, the species has been classified as extinct, due to huge declines probably related to the disease chytridiomycosis, climate change and habitat loss. The species was not recorded between 1989 and 2016, despite some searching in historical localities. It was rediscovered in March 2016 when four adults (two males and two females) were located in Imbabura in two small forest patches in an area heavily modified for agriculture and livestock. These individuals tested negative for chytridiomycosis and were brought to the Jambatu Research and Conservation Center in the hope of establishing a captive breeding population.

== Distribution and habitat ==
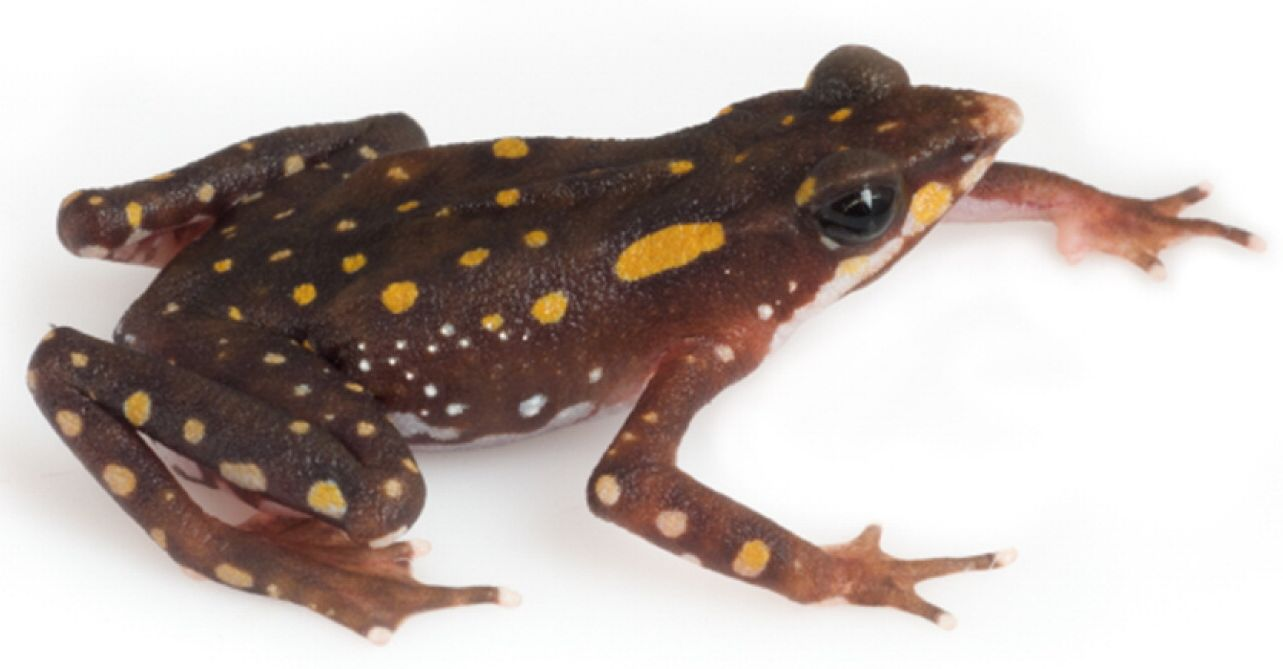
Male Atelopus longirostris from Junín, Ecuador

Atelopus longirostris is historically known from the western slopes of the northern Ecuadorian Andes in the provinces of Esmeraldas, Imbabura, Pichincha, and Cotopaxi, at elevations between 200–2,500 m (660–8,200 ft) above sea level. Tapia and colleagues give a slightly different historic range that includes Imbabura, Cotopaxi, Pichincha, and Santo Domingo de los Tsáchilas Provinces and a narrower altitudinal range, 900–1,925 m (2,953–6,316 ft).

Atelopus longirostris inhabits lowland (but see above) and montane tropical rainforests. Breeding takes place in streams. Populations discovered in 2016 were in isolated, small patches of native forest within a heavily modified landscape. They were all found at night, perched on leaves about half a metre above the ground, some distance away from the nearest rivers.
