= Atelopus chocoensis =

Conservation status
- Critically endangered, possibly extinct (IUCN 3.1)

Scientific classification
- Kingdom: Animalia
- Phylum: Chordata
- Class: Amphibia
- Order: Anura
- Family: Bufonidae
- Genus: Atelopus
- Species: A. chocoensis

Binomial name
- Atelopus chocoensis Lötters, 1992

Species of amphibian

Atelopus chocoensis, the Chocó stubfoot toad, is a species of toad in the family Bufonidae endemic to Colombia. Its natural habitat is subtropical or tropical moist montane forests. It is threatened by habitat loss. With the last individual being collected in 1998 it might already be extinct.
