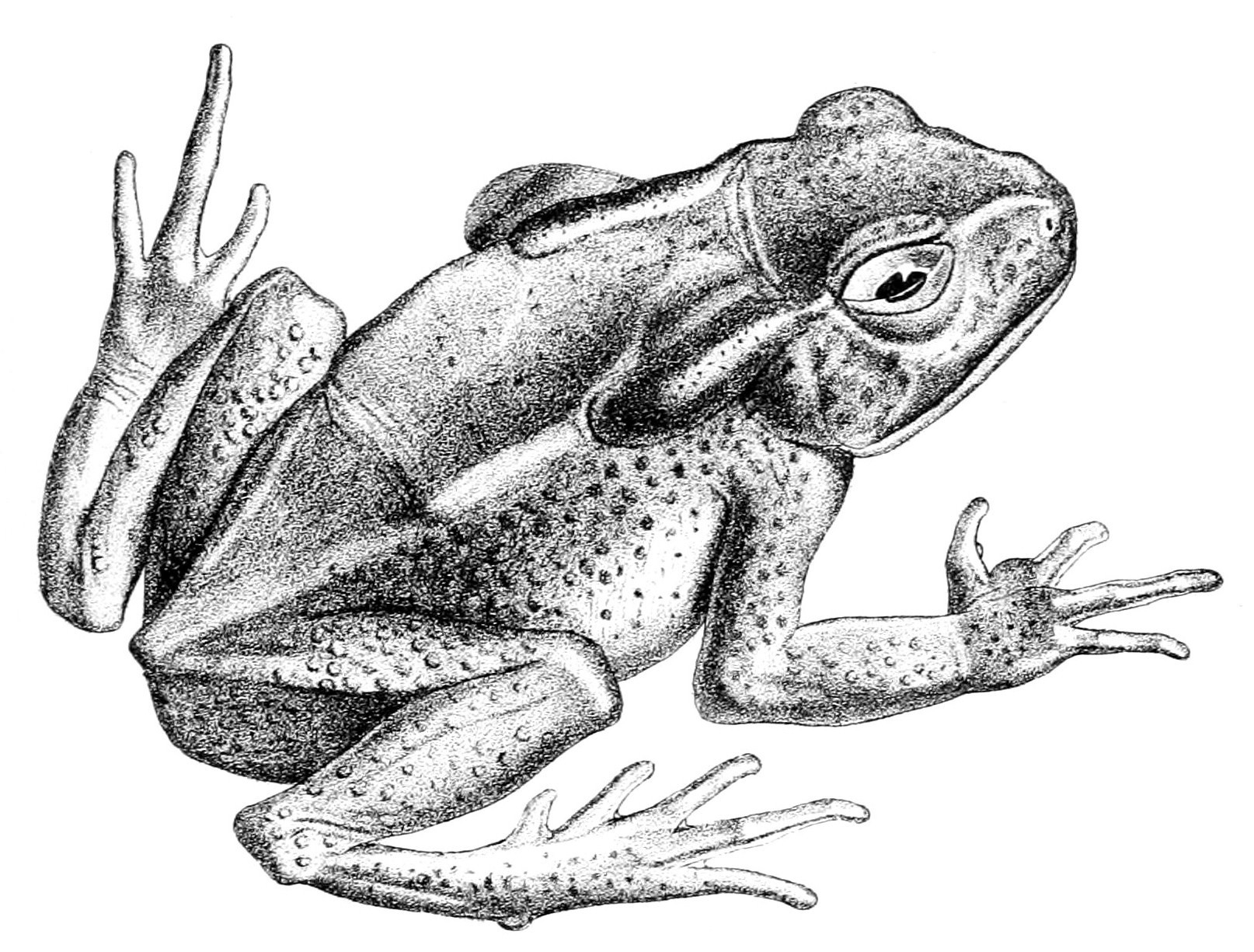

Conservation status
- Endangered (IUCN 3.1)

Scientific classification
- Kingdom: Animalia
- Phylum: Chordata
- Class: Amphibia
- Order: Anura
- Family: Bufonidae
- Genus: Rhaebo
- Species: R. caeruleostictus

Binomial name
- Rhaebo caeruleostictus (Günther, 1859)

Synonyms
- Bufo caeruleostictus Günther, 1859; Bufo chanchanensis Fowler, 1913

= Rhaebo caeruleostictus =

Species of amphibian

Rhaebo caeruleostictus is a species of toad in the family Bufonidae. It is endemic to Ecuador and occurs along the lower western slope of the Cordillera Occidental at elevations of 40–2,000 m (130–6,560 ft) asl. The specific name caeruleostictus, from Latin caeruleus (=blue) and Greek stiktos (spotted), refers to the bluish colour pattern of this species. Accordingly, common name blue-spotted toad has been coined for it.

== Description ==
Males measure 76–81 mm (3.0–3.2 in) and females 72–92 mm (2.8–3.6 in) in snout–vent length. The Dorsum and sides have bluish-blackish vermiculations on orangish background (this coloration is assumed to be aposematic). The tympanum is not visible. The parotoid glands are large.

== Habitat and conservation ==
Its natural habitats are tropical moist forests and cloud forests. It is a terrestrial species that breeds in riparian habitats.

It is a rare species that is threatened by habitat loss caused by agricultural expansion, logging, and wood plantations. It has not been seen since 1997, and it might be extinct.
