= Pristimantis hamiotae =

Conservation status
- Critically endangered, possibly extinct (IUCN 3.1)

Scientific classification
- Kingdom: Animalia
- Phylum: Chordata
- Class: Amphibia
- Order: Anura
- Family: Strabomantidae
- Genus: Pristimantis
- Species: P. hamiotae

Binomial name
- Pristimantis hamiotae (Flores, 1993)

Synonyms
- Eleutherodactylus hamiotae Flores, 1993

Species of frog

Pristimantis hamiotae is a species of frog in the family Strabomantidae. It is endemic to Ecuador. Its natural habitats are tropical moist montane forests and rocky areas. It is threatened by habitat loss.
