= Atelopus mindoensis =

Conservation status
- Critically Endangered (IUCN 3.1)

Scientific classification
- Kingdom: Animalia
- Phylum: Chordata
- Class: Amphibia
- Order: Anura
- Family: Bufonidae
- Genus: Atelopus
- Species: A. mindoensis

Binomial name
- Atelopus mindoensis Peters, 1973

Species of amphibian

The Mindo stubfoot toad or Mindo harlequin toad (Atelopus mindoensis) is a species of toad in the family Bufonidae. It is endemic to Ecuador in Pichincha, Santo Domingo and Cotopaxi Provinces. Its natural habitats are subtropical or tropical moist lowland forests, subtropical or tropical moist montane forests, and rivers. It has a unique appearance and color pattern, being green and red with white speckles, and due to this it was once considered an emblematic species of the Mindo Valley.

It is threatened by chytridomycosis and habitat loss, and was previously feared extinct, being last seen in Pichincha Province on May 7, 1989. It was not seen again for over 30 years, and any hopes for its survival and rediscovery were considered "unlikely", as the cloud forests it lived in were the most well-documented in the country. However, a remnant breeding population was discovered in 2019 in a privately owned cloud forest preserve, and this discovery was documented in 2020. This makes A. mindoensis one of the many members of its genus to be rediscovered in the 21st century following decades of no sightings. Four tadpoles were discovered in the Arlequín Reserve in 2025, the first to be recorded and photographed.

== Sources ==
- Coloma, L.A.; Ron, S.; Bustamante, M.R.; Yánez-Muñoz, M.; Cisneros-Heredia, D.; Almendáriz, A. (2004). "Atelopus mindoensis". IUCN Red List of Threatened Species. 2004 e.T54526A11161460. doi:10.2305/IUCN.UK.2004.RLTS.T54526A11161460.en.
