= Atelopus famelicus =

Conservation status
- Critically Endangered (IUCN 3.1)

Scientific classification
- Kingdom: Animalia
- Phylum: Chordata
- Class: Amphibia
- Order: Anura
- Family: Bufonidae
- Genus: Atelopus
- Species: A. famelicus

Binomial name
- Atelopus famelicus Rivero and Morales, 1995 (Note: Year based on the actual date of publication, not the nominal date in 1992)

Synonyms
- Atelopus negreti Ruiz-Carranza, Vélez and Ardila-Robayo, 1995

Species of amphibian

Atelopus famelicus is a species of toad in the family Bufonidae endemic to Colombia. It is known from the Cordillera Occidental in Cauca and Valle del Cauca departments (the population in the latter has since been extirpated).

== Description ==
Males grow to 38 mm (1.5 in) while the females measure 36–45 mm (1.4–1.8 in) in snout–vent length. Tympanum is absent. The fingers have rudimentary webbing while the toes are partially webbed. Coloration is generally reddish brown with yellowish tones towards the flanks. The belly is dirty yellowish with numerous fine brown or black spots. A yellow lateral line may be present.

== Habitat and conservation ==
Atelopus famelicus is a terrestrial frog found in montane forest at elevations of 800–1,580 m (2,620–5,180 ft) above sea level. It probably has stream-dwelling tadpoles.

This species has only been recorded at two localities in Cauca and one in Valle del Cauca. The Cauca populations are threatened by habitat loss. Also chytridiomycosis could be a threat. The latest record of the species is from 2005 from the Valle de Cauca locality. However, the population there is now considered extinct because of drying of the habitat after road building. An exhaustive search in one the Cauca localities in 2000 did not record any specimens. The two Cauca localities are on the border of the Munchique National Natural Park. One of them was inside a private reserve that was in 2004 taken over by a guerilla group and no longer provides protection to the species.
