= Samaná, Caldas =

- Municipality and town
- Flag Coat of arms

- Location of the municipality and town of Samaná, Caldas in the Caldas Department of Colombia.

- Location in Colombia
- Coordinates: 5°24′47″N 74°59′34″W
- Country: Colombia
- Department: Caldas Department
- Established: 28 August 1884

Area
  - Total: 761.02 km^{2} (293.83 sq mi)

Population (Census 2018)
  - Total: 17,466
  - Density: 22.951/km^{2} (59.442/sq mi)
- Time zone: UTC-5 (Colombia Standard Time)
- Website: samana-caldas.gov.co

Samaná is a town and municipality in the Colombian Department of Caldas.

It is about 220 km north west of Bogota.

Facilities include the Parque Simon Bolívar park and the Fundacion Batuta Caldas academy of music.

== Climate ==
Samaná has a relatively cool due to altitude and very wet tropical rainforest climate (Köppen Af). It is the wettest place in the department of Caldas.

Climate data for Samaná, elevation 1,475 m (4,839 ft), (1981–2010)
Month	Jan	Feb	Mar	Apr	May	Jun	Jul	Aug	Sep	Oct	Nov	Dec	Year
Mean daily maximum °C (°F)	21.7 (71.1)	22.0 (71.6)	21.9 (71.4)	22.1 (71.8)	22.1 (71.8)	22.7 (72.9)	23.3 (73.9)	23.6 (74.5)	22.8 (73.0)	21.9 (71.4)	21.6 (70.9)	21.5 (70.7)	22.3 (72.1)
Daily mean °C (°F)	19.2 (66.6)	19.3 (66.7)	19.4 (66.9)	19.5 (67.1)	19.5 (67.1)	19.9 (67.8)	20.2 (68.4)	20.4 (68.7)	19.9 (67.8)	19.3 (66.7)	19.1 (66.4)	19.1 (66.4)	19.6 (67.3)
Mean daily minimum °C (°F)	16.4 (61.5)	16.3 (61.3)	16.5 (61.7)	16.3 (61.3)	16.0 (60.8)	16.7 (62.1)	16.6 (61.9)	16.6 (61.9)	16.1 (61.0)	16.1 (61.0)	16.2 (61.2)	16.2 (61.2)	16.3 (61.3)
Average precipitation mm (inches)	579.5 (22.81)	489.1 (19.26)	589.6 (23.21)	653.0 (25.71)	628.9 (24.76)	332.5 (13.09)	263.1 (10.36)	310.0 (12.20)	530.2 (20.87)	794.7 (31.29)	836.4 (32.93)	810.3 (31.90)	6,817.4 (268.40)
Average relative humidity (%)	93	92	93	92	92	90	86	85	89	92	94	94	91
Mean monthly sunshine hours	86.8	79.0	58.9	69.0	93.0	141.0	179.8	167.4	120.0	74.4	60.0	62.0	1,191.3
Mean daily sunshine hours	2.8	2.8	1.9	2.3	3.0	4.7	5.8	5.4	4.0	2.4	2.0	2.0	3.3
Source: Instituto de Hidrologia Meteorologia y Estudios Ambientales
