= Santa Marta montane forests =

Ecoregion in Colombia

Santa Marta montane forests (NT0159)
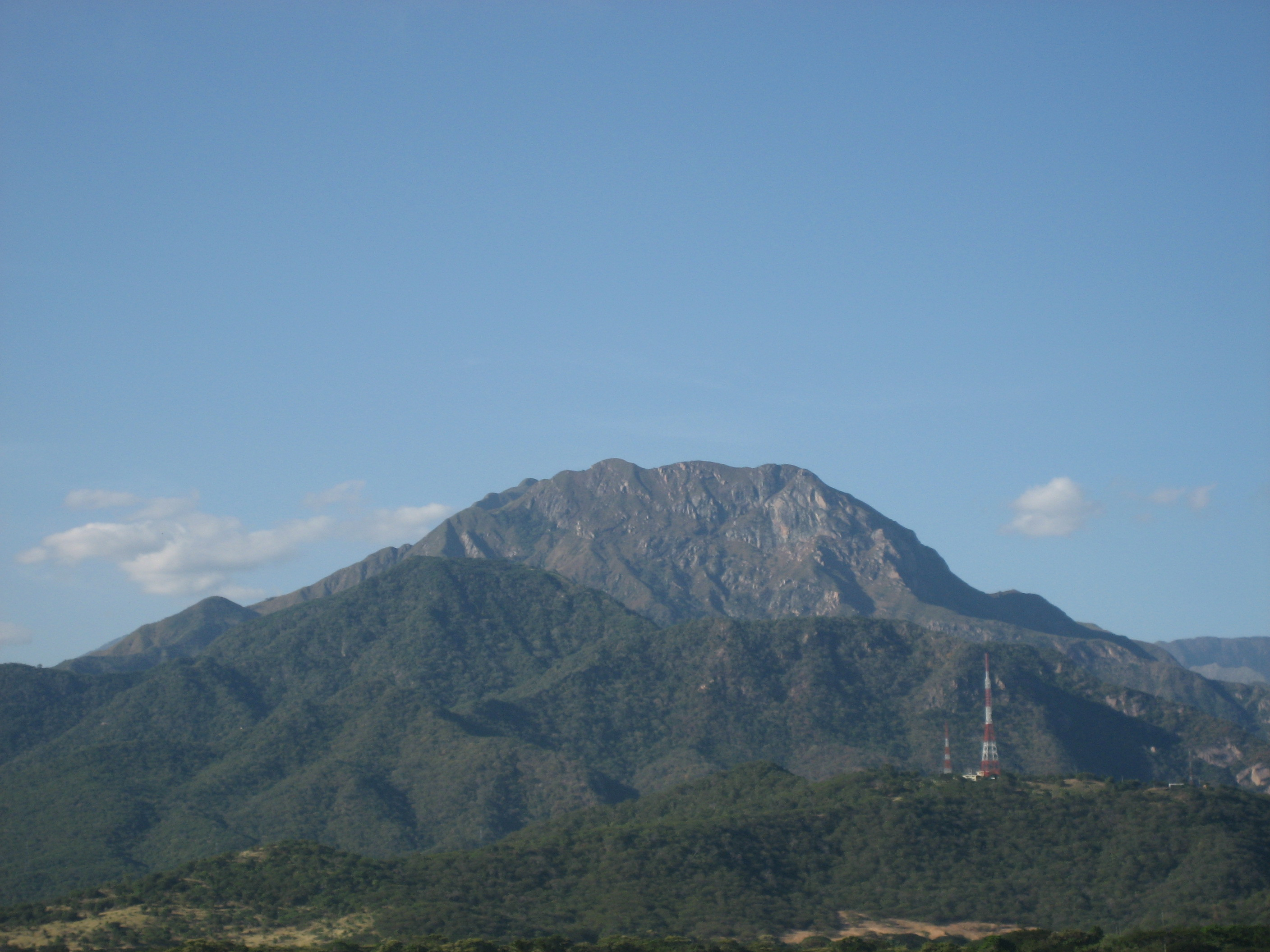
- Cerro Murillo

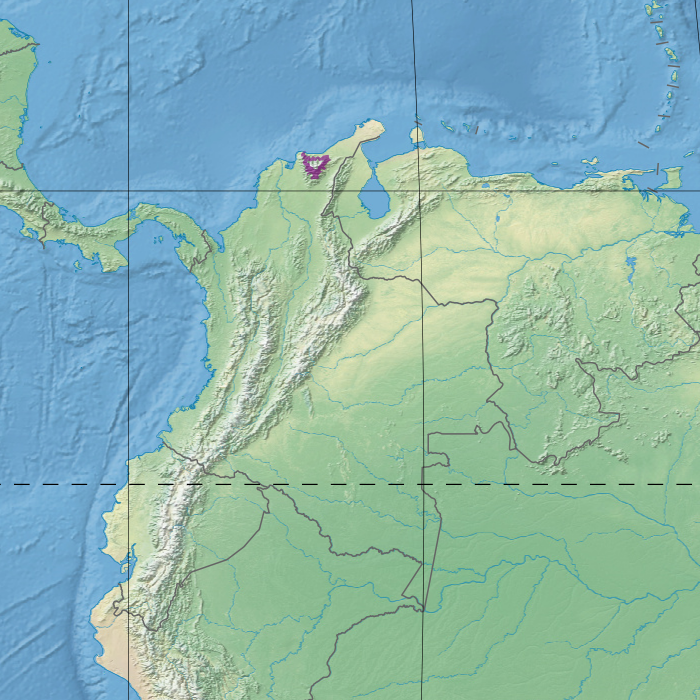
- Ecoregion territory (in purple)

Ecology
- Realm: Neotropical
- Biome: Tropical and subtropical moist broadleaf forests
- Borders: Guajira-Barranquilla xeric scrub; Santa Marta páramo; Sinú Valley dry forests

Geography
- Area: 4,920 km^{2} (1,900 mi^{2})
- Countries: Colombia
- Coordinates: 10.532°N 73.617°W
- Climate type: Cwb: warm temperate, winter dry, warm summer.

The Santa Marta montane forests (NT0159) is an ecoregion in the Sierra Nevada de Santa Marta, a massif on the Caribbean coast of northern Colombia. The ecoregion covers elevations from near sea level up to around 3,300 metres (10,827 ft), where it gives way to Santa Marta páramo. The isolation of the massif and the range of elevations and climates has resulted in a wide variety of species including many endemics. The lower levels contained tropical rainforest, which has largely been cleared. Higher up, this gives way to cloud forest. Much of this has also been cleared for coffee plantations, pasture for sheep and cattle, and farming.

== Geography ==
=== Location ===
The ecoregion covers the slopes of the Sierra Nevada de Santa Marta in the north of Colombia, with an area of 492,097 hectares (1,216,000 acres). The range rises to snow-covered peaks only 60 kilometres (37 mi) from the Caribbean sea. The ecoregion is almost entirely surrounded by the Sinú Valley dry forests ecoregion. To the northeast and northwest it transitions directly into Guajira–Barranquilla xeric scrub. In the higher elevations of the mountains the ecoregion gives way to Santa Marta páramo.

=== Terrain ===
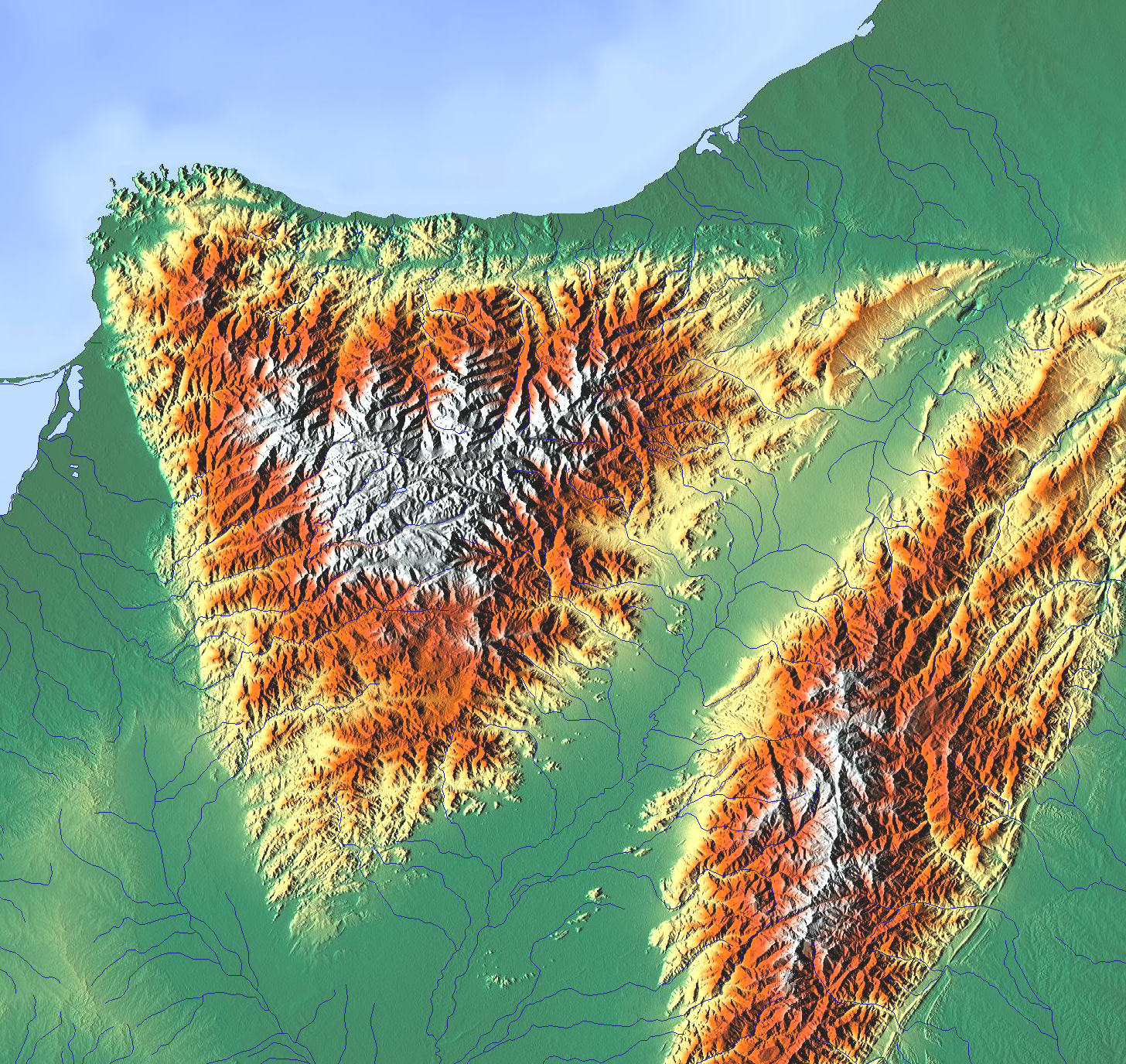
Sierra Nevada de Santa Marta (left) and Serranía del Perijá (right)

The triangular Sierra Nevada de Santa Marta massif covers 12,230 square kilometres (4,720 sq mi) and rises to an elevation of 5,775 metres (18,947 ft), with peaks that are permanently capped in snow. The northern edge is parallel to the Caribbean coast. The southwestern edge descends to the dry and warm Magdalena River alluvial plain and the Ciénaga Grande de Santa Marta marshes. The southeastern edge adjoins the valleys of the Cesar River and Ranchería River.

Volcanic rocks from the Mesozoic (252–66 Ma (Note: Ma: Million years ago)) and Tertiary (65–2.58 Ma) eras include batholiths of granite, diorite and quartz monzonite, and there are areas of sedimentary rocks. The massif was pushed up to its present height in the Miocene (23–5.33 Ma) and Late Pleistocene (126,000–11,700 years ago). Glacial lakes at elevations over 3,000 metres (9,800 ft) are the sources of the main rivers that originate in the massif.

=== Climate ===
Average air temperatures range from 27 °C (81 °F) in the plains to 6 °C (43 °F) or less in the peaks. Rain is carried by the northeast trade winds, with wet seasons from September to December and from May to July. The north side receives the most precipitation, up to 3,000 millimetres (120 in) annually at 1,000 to 1,500 metres (3,300 to 4,900 ft) above sea level, with less rain higher up and to the south of the massif. At a sample location at 10.75°N 73.75°W the Köppen climate classification is Cwb: warm temperate, winter dry, warm summer. Mean temperatures range from 11.4 °C (52.5 °F) in January to 13.8 °C (56.8 °F) in June. Total annual precipitation is about 1,800 millimetres (71 in). Monthly precipitation at the sample location ranges from 29.9 millimetres (1.18 in) in February to 304.5 millimetres (11.99 in) in October.

== Ecology ==
The ecoregion is in the neotropical realm, in the tropical and subtropical moist broadleaf forests biome. The isolated location surrounded by dry forests has allowed many endemic species of flora and fauna to develop. It is seen as a biological and geographic island, distinct from the Andes. However, there are similarities to the Serranía del Perijá, to the east, which is normally included in the Cordillera Oriental montane forests. 76% of bird species in Perijá are shared with the Sierra Nevada de Santa Marta. 80% of Perijá's butterflies in the Ithomiinae and Heliconiinae families is shared with the Sierra Nevada, but only 40% with the eastern slope of the Cordillera Oriental further to the south.

The ecoregion is part of the Northern Andean Montane Forests global ecoregion, which includes the Magdalena Valley montane forests, Venezuelan Andes montane forests, Northwestern Andean montane forests, Cauca Valley montane forests, Cordillera Oriental montane forests, Santa Marta montane forests and Eastern Cordillera Real montane forests terrestrial ecoregions.

=== Flora ===
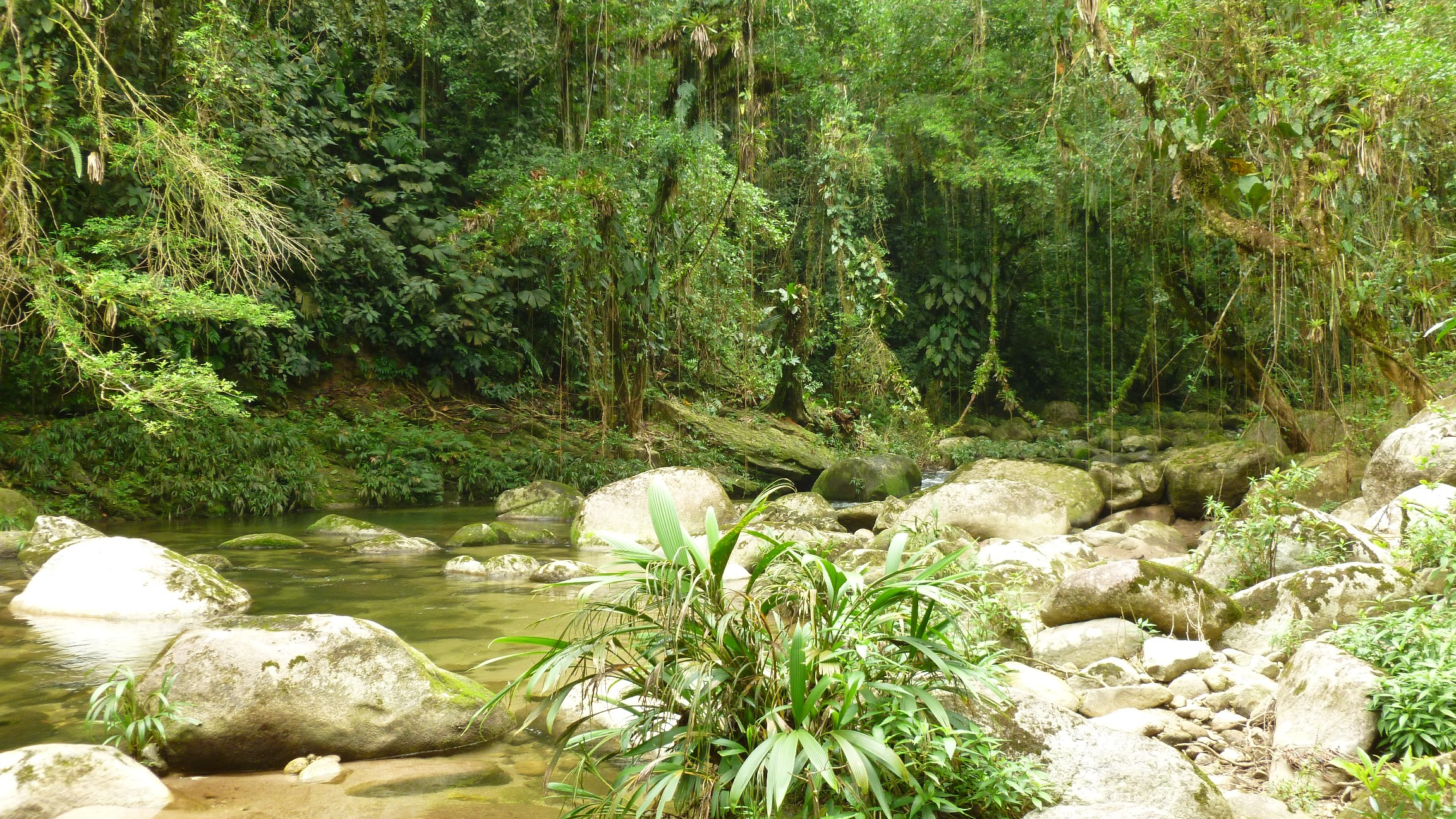
Primary forest in Sierra Nevada de Santa Marta

There are warm, wet forests on the north of the massif and part of the west, isolated from similar forests elsewhere. These tropical rain forests at elevations up to 900 metres (2,953 ft) have trees that may reach 35 metres (115 ft) in height depending on rainfall. The understory contains tree ferns and grasses with large leaves. There are some endemic species, but relatively low diversity compared to other neotropical ecoregions. These forests are considered to be a Pleistocene refuge. There are few species in common with the cloud forests higher up, but there are similarities to wet forests elsewhere in Colombia, in Panama and Venezuela, and at a family level to forests in the Amazon.

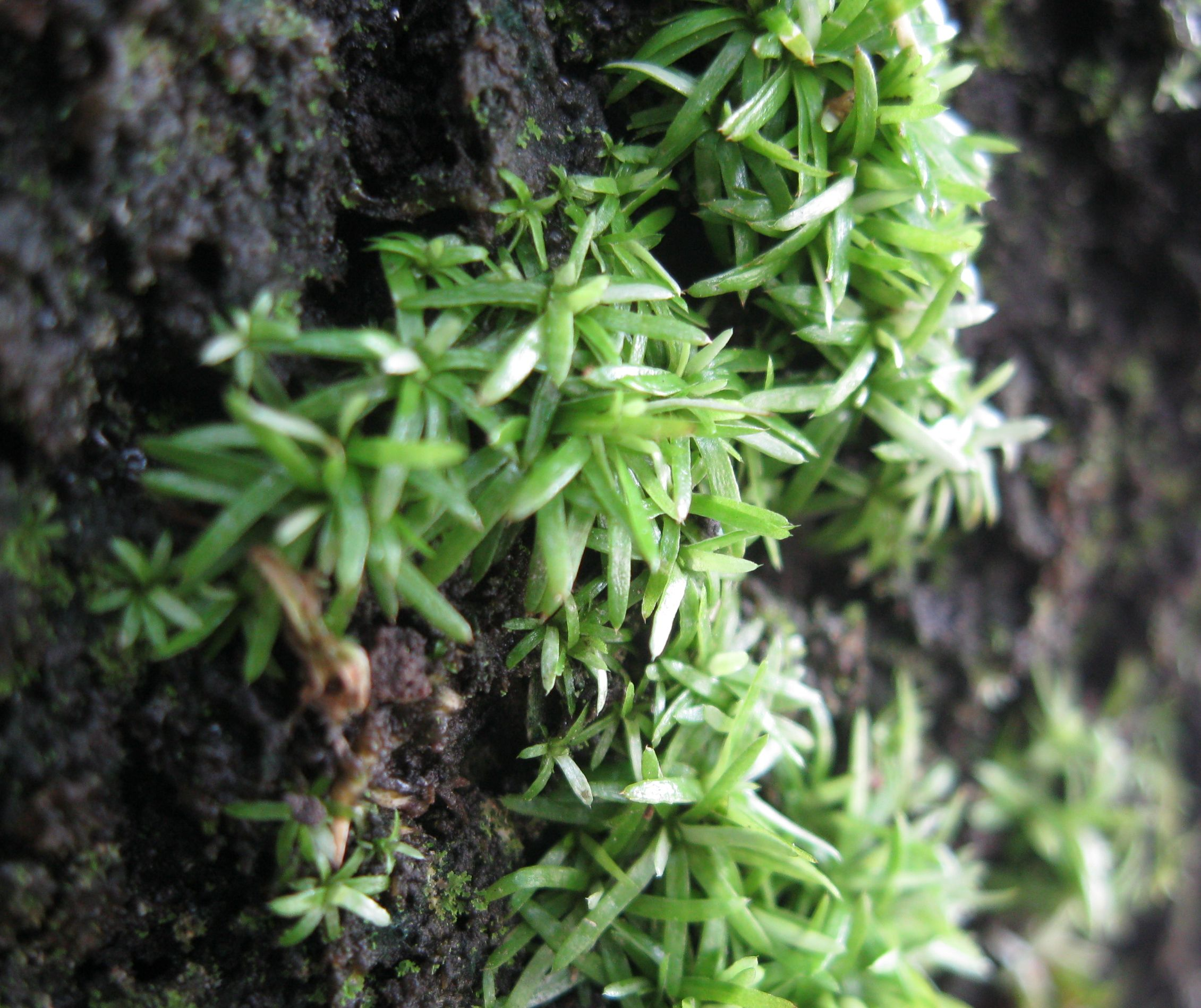
Octoblepharum albidum

On the drier western side forests at elevations from 800 to 1,000 metres (2,625 to 3,281 ft) above sea level have large trees including Poulsenia armata, red ucuuba (Virola sebifera), Pterygota colombiana, muskwood (Guarea guidonia), Panama rubber tree (Castilla elastica), Ficus macrosyce, avocado (Persea americana) and Andean royal palm (Dictyocaryum lamarckianum). Above 900 metres (2,953 ft) the trees and palms are smaller, and include Zygia longifolia, forest acai (Euterpe precatoria), Súrtuba (Geonoma interrupta) and spiny treefern (Cyathea pungens). The forests include vascular epiphytes such as Vriesea elata and droophead tufted airplant (Guzmania lingulata), understory plants with large leaves such as Rattlesnake Plant (Calathea insignis) and dumb cane (Dieffenbachia longispatha), and mosses and liverworts such as Octoblepharum albidum and Leucomium strumosum.

There are cloud forests above 1,000 metres (3,281 ft), with vegetation related to the forests of the tropical Andes and the higher elevations in the Caribbean, which contain many endemic species. In some areas the cloud forest dips down to lower levels. The trees at elevations up to 2,500 metres (8,202 ft) form a canopy of 25 to 35 metres (82 to 115 ft) in height. The flowering plant families with the largest numbers of genera are Asteraceae, Orchidaceae, Fabaceae and Rubiaceae. The genera Monochaetum and Tillandsia each have five endemic species. The family Melastomataceae has 13 endemic species.

Andean royal palms (Dictyocarium lamarckianum) emerge from the cloud forest canopy, and dominate wet and sloping areas. They are common from 900 to 1,600 metres (2,953 to 5,249 ft), and the wax palm (Ceroxylon ceriferum) is common from 1,800 to 2,500 metres (5,906 to 8,202 ft). Other cloud forest tree species include palo azul (Calatola costaricensis), Cavendishia callista, Graffenrieda santamartensis, Gustavia speciosa and Arawakia weddelliana. The understory includes tree ferns, palms, prop-root plants, vascular epiphytes and woody lianas. There are many Bryophytes such as the thallose liverwort Dumortiera hirsuta and the moss Phyllogonium fulgens.

Cloud forests from 15 to 20 metres (49 to 66 ft) high are found in areas with heavy fog and mist between elevations of 2,500 to 3,300 metres (8,202 to 10,827 ft), although there is less rainfall than on the lower slopes. Typical tree species are wax palm (Ceroxylon ceriferum), Chaetolepis santamartensis, Chusquea tuberculosa, Hesperomeles ferruginea, Monochaetum uberrimum, Myrcianthes myrsinoides, Myrsine coriacea, Paragynoxys undatifolia, Pino de Pasto (Podocarpus oleifolius) and Weinmannia pinnata. Bryophytes and lichens include Anastrophyllum auritum, Musgo (Campylopus benedictii), bonfire moss (Funaria hygrometrica) and Hypotrachyna gigas.

Many plants are endemic to the ecoregion, including 13 species in the family Melastomataceae and the genera Castanedia and Kirkbridea.

=== Fauna ===
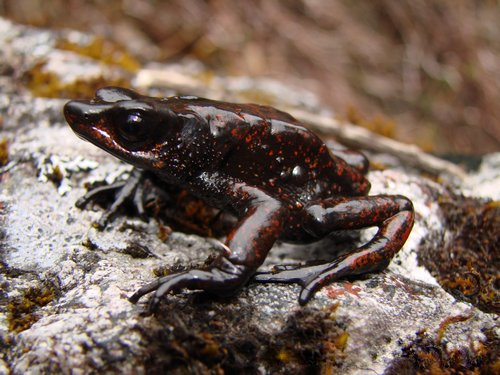
Guajira stubfoot toad (Atelopus carrikeri)

Mammal species include the Central American agouti (Dasyprocta punctata), jaguar (Panthera onca), lowland paca (Cuniculus paca), neotropical otter (Lontra longicaudis), ocelot (Leopardus pardalis), South American tapir (Tapirus terrestris), Venezuelan red howler (Alouatta seniculus) and white-lipped peccary (Tayassu pecari). Endemic mammals include the red-tailed squirrel (Sciurus granatensis), Tomes's rice rat (Nephelomys albigularis) and unicolored Oldfield mouse (Thomasomys monochromos). Endangered mammals include the red-crested tree-rat (Santamartamys rufodorsalis).

Bird species include bay-headed tanager (Tangara gyrola), black-chested jay (Cyanocorax affinis), blue-billed curassow (Crax alberti), coppery emerald (Chlorostilbon russatus), crested guan (Penelope purpurascens), keel-billed toucan (Ramphastos sulfuratus), Santa Marta blossomcrown (Anthocephala floriceps), scarlet-fronted parakeet (Psittacara wagleri) and white-tipped quetzal (Pharomachrus fulgidus).

Birds with restricted ranges include black-backed thornbill (Ramphomicron dorsale), green-bearded helmetcrest (Oxypogon guerinii), montane woodcreeper (Lepidocolaptes lacrymiger), mountain velvetbreast (Lafresnaya lafresnayi), Santa Marta parakeet (Pyrrhura viridicata), strong-billed woodcreeper (Xiphocolaptes promeropirhynchus), white-tipped quetzal (Pharomachrus fulgidus) and yellow-crowned whitestart (Myioborus flavivertex). Endemic birds include the Santa Marta parakeet (Pyrrhura viridicata) and white-tailed starfrontlet (Coeligena phalerata). Endangered birds include the black-and-chestnut eagle (Spizaetus isidori), black-backed thornbill (Ramphomicron dorsale), blue-billed curassow (Crax alberti), Santa Marta bush tyrant (Myiotheretes pernix), Santa Marta parakeet (Pyrrhura viridicata), Santa Marta sabrewing (Campylopterus phainopeplus) and Santa Marta wren (Troglodytes monticola).

There are many species of reptiles and amphibians. Endemic sauria include the Colombian clawed gecko (Pseudogonatodes furvus), Ptychoglossus romaleos, Proctoporus specularis. and the Santa Marta anole (Anolis santamartae), Amphibians include several Pristimantis species, mostly at the higher elevations, including Cebolleta Robber Frog (Pristimantis tayrona), Cristina's Robber Frog (Pristimantis cristinae), Ruthven's Robber Frog (Pristimantis ruthveni) and Santa Marta robber frog (Pristimantis sanctaemartae). The only endemic amphibian genus of the Sierra Nevada includes Walker's Sierra frog (Geobatrachus walkeri). Endangered amphibians include Atelopus arsyecue, Guajira stubfoot toad (Atelopus carrikeri), Harlequin frog (Atelopus laetissimus), Nahumae stubfoot toad (Atelopus nahumae), Walker's stubfoot toad (Atelopus walkeri), Santa Marta poison arrow frog (Colostethus ruthveni), Boulenger's backpack frog (Cryptobatrachus boulengeri), Walker's sierra frog (Geobatrachus walkeri), Ground robber frog (Pristimantis insignitus) and Ruthven's robber frog (Pristimantis ruthveni).

== Status ==
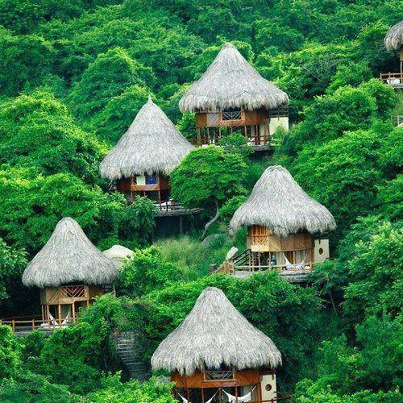
Indigenous houses

The World Wide Fund for Nature (WWF) gives the region the status of "Vulnerable". The massif was settled in the Pre-Columbian era, and traces of these communities remain. Areas of the ecoregion have been sporadically occupied since the end of the 19th century. From 70% to 80% of the original forest has been cleared in the last 50 years. The wet forest of the lower levels has been reduced to thinned-out fragments by settlements, marijuana and coca cultivation, logging, extraction of firewood and conversion to pasture. Deforestation causes erosion, mud slides in the rainy seasons and silting of the rivers.

In the late 19th century large belts of forest at the middle levels were converted to coffee cultivation. Large areas of forest have also been cleared to create pasture, kept clear by annual burns. Higher up, the Ancho and Frío river basins and other parts of the cloud forest have been modified to make space for sheep and cattle rearing, farming of potatoes and fruit, and extraction of wood. Forests clearance has threatened the populations of large animals, which are also hunted for food, for their skins, or as perceived threats to cattle. Roads opened to the higher areas have led to looting of pre-Columbian sites, hunting and extraction of firewood.

A 2006 book reported that of the 4,840.75 square kilometres (1,869.02 sq mi) Santa Marta montane forests 33.4% had been transformed by human activity. Parts of the ecoregion are theoretically protected by the Sierra Nevada de Santa Marta National Park, Tayrona National Natural Park and Sierra Nevada de Santa Marta Biosphere Reserve, but these areas were still being cleared in 1998. The indigenous reserves of the Cogui, Arsario and Arhuaco people overlap the Sierra Nevada de Santa Marta National Park.

== Sources ==
- Eduino Carbono, Northern South America: Northern Colombia (NT0159), WWF
- Naranjo, Luis German, Northern South America: Central Colombia and northeastern Venezuela (NT0118), WWF: World Wildlife Fund
- Northern Andean Montane Forests, WWF Global, archived from the original on 2017-04-25
- "Santa Marta montane forests", Global Species, Myers Enterprises II
- WildFinder, WWF: World Wildlife Fund
- Zimmerer, Karl S. (15 September 2006), Globalization and New Geographies of Conservation, University of Chicago Press, ISBN 978-0-226-98344-8
