= Santa Marta páramo =

Ecoregion in Sierra Nevada de Santa Marta, Colombia

Santa Marta páramo (NT1007)
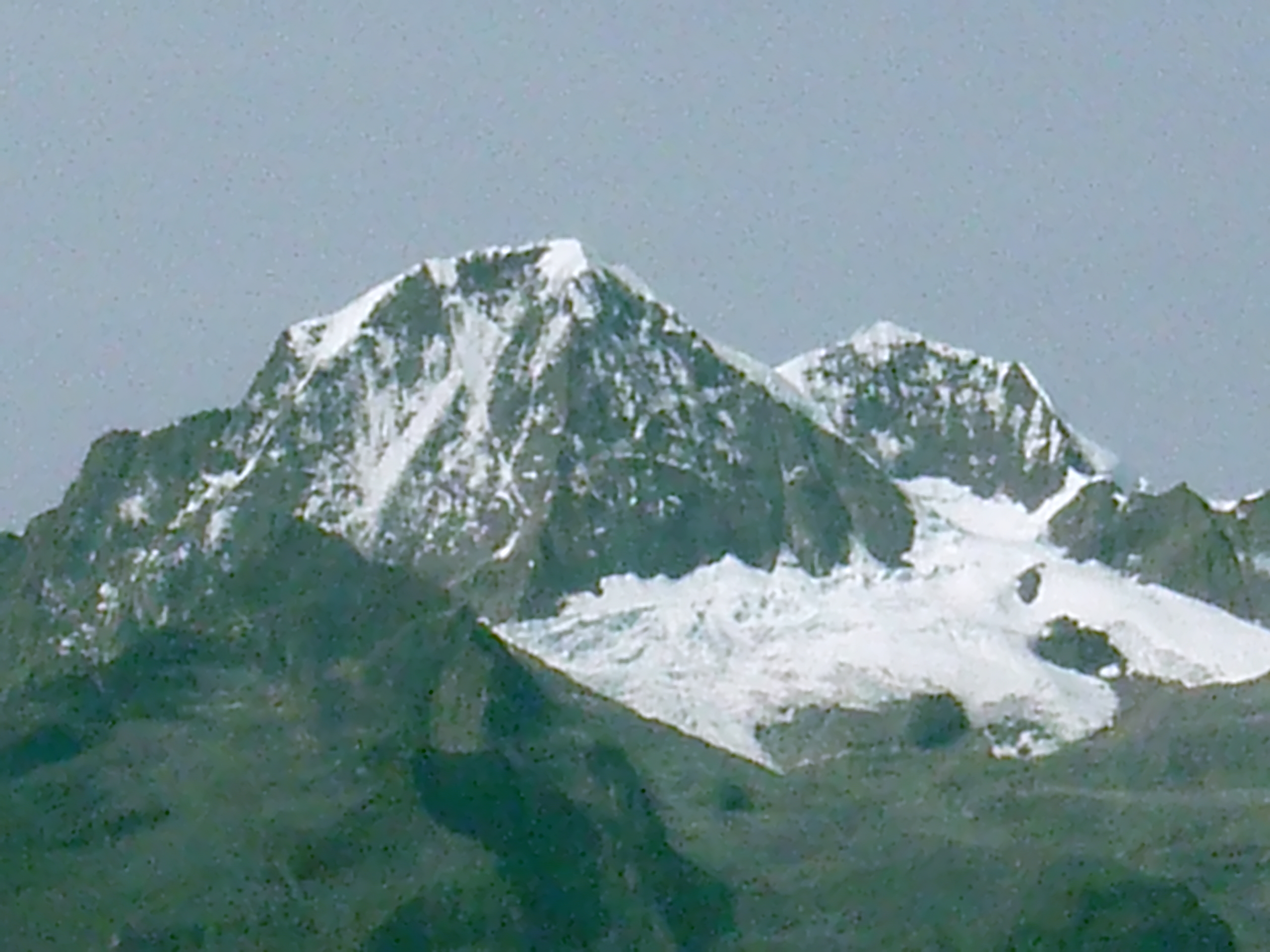
- Pico Cristobal Colon

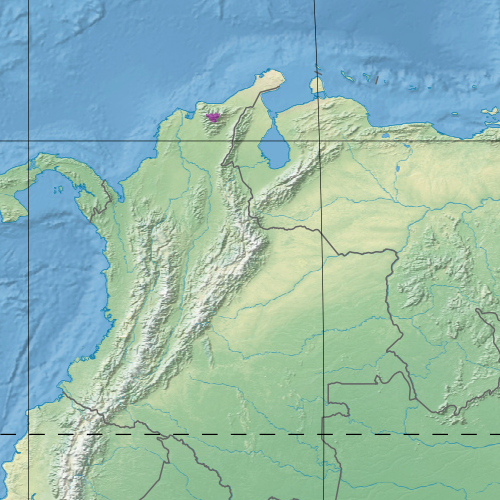
- Ecoregion territory (in purple)

Ecology
- Realm: Neotropical
- Biome: Montane grasslands and shrublands

Geography
- Area: 1,295 km^{2} (500 mi^{2})
- Countries: Colombia
- Coordinates: 10.827°N 73.667°W
- Climate type: Cwb: warm temperate, winter dry, warm summer

The Santa Marta páramo (NT1007) is an ecoregion containing páramo (high moorland) vegetation above the treeline in the Sierra Nevada de Santa Marta mountain range on the Caribbean coast of Colombia. The isolated position of the range has allowed unique species to evolve. Some are related to those found in Central America and the Caribbean coastal areas, and some to species from the Andes. The habitat is relatively stable, but has been drastically changed from the original by long-term human activity.

== Geography ==
=== Location ===
The Santa Marta páramo has an area of 129,499 hectares (320,000 acres). It covers the upper levels of the Sierra Nevada de Santa Marta in the north of Colombia. This is a roughly triangular massif with its north side parallel to the Caribbean sea, the southwest side facing the swamps of the Ciénaga Grande de Santa Marta and the southeast side facing the Serranía del Perijá mountains across the Cesar and Ranchería river valleys. The ecoregion is surrounded by the Santa Marta montane forests ecoregion, which in turn is surrounded by the Sinú Valley dry forests and Guajira–Barranquilla xeric scrub ecoregions.

=== Physical ===
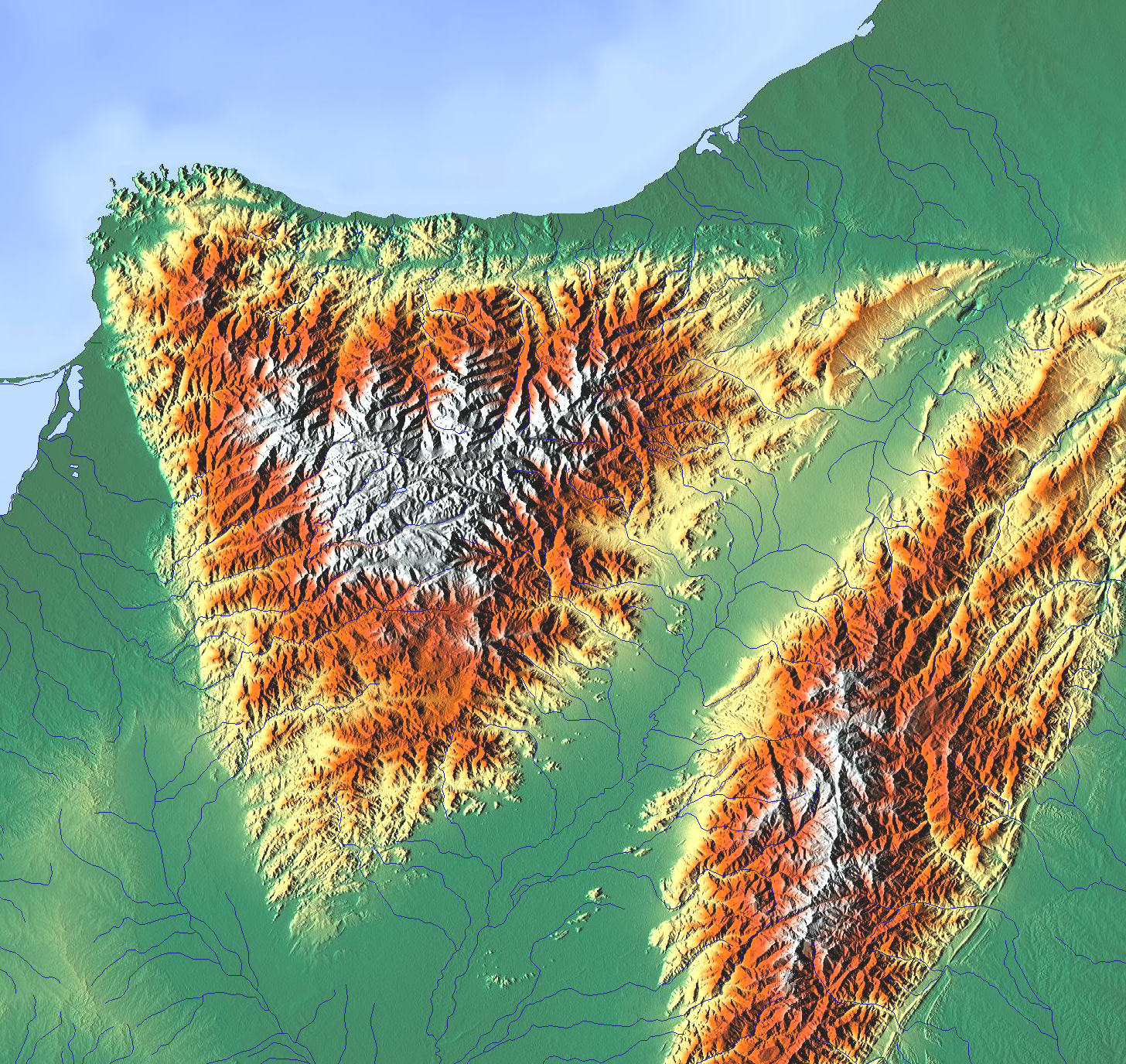
Sierra Nevada de Santa Marta (left) and Serranía del Perijá (right)

The Santa Marta páramo is the most northern section of páramo (high moor) in South America. The isolated Sierra Nevada de Santa Marta has an elevation of 5,775 metres (18,947 ft). The páramo is found between the treeline around 3,300 metres (10,800 ft) and the snowline around 5,000 metres (16,000 ft), with some variations due to differences in slope, rainfall and exposure to the wind and sun. The area is almost all granodiorite from the Jurassic period.

=== Climate ===
The Köppen climate classification is "Cwb": warm temperate, winter dry, warm summer. Where the Northern Andean páramo is generally humid throughout the year with moisture delivered in the form of rain, clouds and fog as air masses are lifted up over the mountains, the Santa Marta páramo is similar to the Costa Rican páramo and Cordillera de Merida páramo, where the northeast trade winds create a distinct dry season. Moist air currents rise every day and produce mist and rain. Most rain falls in May and September.

At a sample location at coordinates 10.75°N 73.75°W mean monthly temperatures ranged from 11.4 °C (52.5 °F) in January to 13.8 °C (56.8 °F) in June. Yearly average temperature was about 13 °C (55 °F), with average minimum of 8 °C (46 °F) and maximum of 18.5 °C (65.3 °F). Average total rainfall was about 1,800 millimetres (71 in). Mean monthly rainfall varied from 33.3 millimetres (1.31 in) in January to 245.2 millimetres (9.65 in) in May, falling back to 115.2 millimetres (4.54 in) in July and rising again to 304.5 millimetres (11.99 in) in October.

== Ecology ==
The Santa Marta páramo ecoregion is in the neotropical realm, in the montane grasslands and shrublands biome. The ecoregion is part of the Northern Andean Paramo global ecoregion, which also includes the Cordillera Central páramo, Cordillera de Merida páramo and Northern Andean páramo terrestrial ecoregions. The plants and animals are adapted to the cold, dry conditions of the high peaks. There is a high level of local endemism, particularly on the more isolated peaks. The Sierra Nevada de Santa Marta has been designated a Biosphere Reserve due to the endemic plants and animals, particularly at the higher levels.

=== Origins ===
The Andes began to rise in the Miocene epoch, but in the north did not reach their present height until the Pliocene during a period of strong volcanic activity between four and five million years ago. This was the period when land rose above the tree line and the protopáramo vegetation was formed with new species of the Poaceae, Cyperaceae, Asteraceae, Ericaceae and other families. During the later parts of the Quaternary epoch there were alternating glacial and interglacial periods, with short, cold and dry periods alternating with warmer and more humid periods. The páramo belts moved lower and joined together in the cold periods, and moved higher into unconnected enclaves when the temperatures rose. The result is a mix of species of tropical and boreal origin with genera that are found in most páramos, but many endemic species in the individual páramos.

The Sierra Nevada de Santa Marta páramo is isolated and has a unique composition of flora and fauna. The isolation has given time for endemic species to evolve including the genera Castanedia and Raouliopsis. The species evolved from warm tropical species adapted to moist conditions and from Andean species that migrated along the eastern cordillera of Colombia. The flora is closer to the flora of the Cordillera de Merida páramo and the Cordillera de la Costa montane forests than to the Northern Andean páramo. It is descended from flora growing on land that was lifted to intermediate elevations in the early and middle Cenozoic, and that differentiated when the land was lifted to high elevations during the Pliocene and Pleistocene.

A 2013 analysis of the páramo units in Colombia evaluated similarities between their endemic flora. It found that the units naturally formed into five biogeographical provinces: The definition of the Páramos del Norte province differs from the traditional grouping, where the Santa Marta páramo is treated as a separate ecoregion and the Perijá páramo is included in the Cordillera Oriental province. The flora of these two is closer to the Páramos de Chirripó of Central America than to the rest of the Northern Andean páramo, despite their being separated by the Cesar River valley.

=== Flora ===
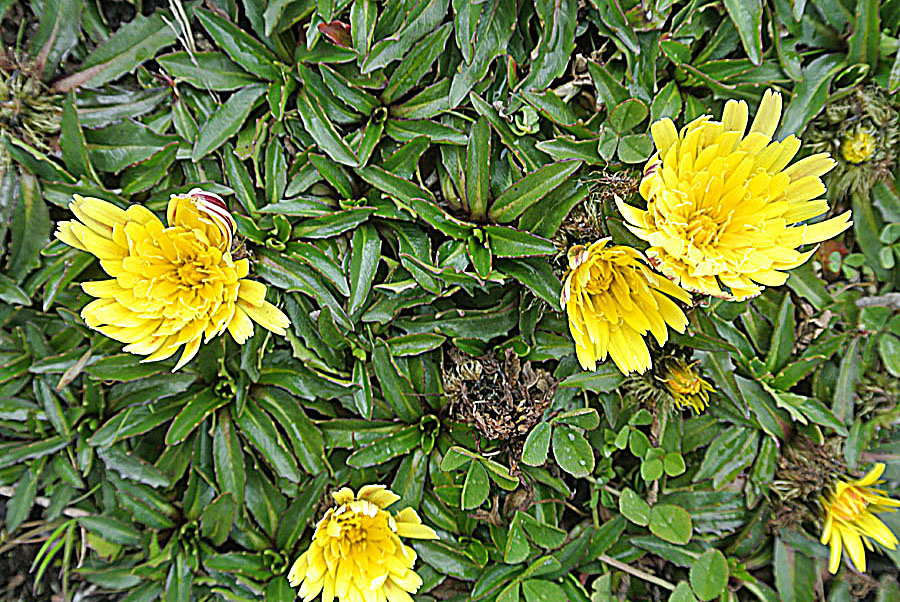
Chikku Chikku (Hypochaeris sessiliflora)

The páramo contains high altitude tussock grassland, thicket, bogs and marshes. Vegetation on the northern side receives more rain and is rougher than the vegetation on the southern side, which is protected from the trade winds. 125 species of angiosperms have been recorded that are endemic to the Sierra Nevada, of which 61 are found only in the páramo. 135 genera of vascular plants have been recorded. Raouliopsis and Obtegomeria are endemic. Pentacalia has 8 of its 11 endemic species that grow only in the páramo. Diplostephium has 9 of its 10 endemic species that grow only in the páramo. Other genera with species endemic to the páramo include Micropleura, Niphogetum, Perissocaelum and Cotopaxia.

The vegetation has strips of typical páramo vegetation formations. The lowest "subpáramo" strip along the Andean forest margin is more shrubby. Flora include Calamagrostis effusa, Arcytophyllum nitidum, Stevia lucida, Escallonia myrtilloides, Hesperomeles lanuginosa. The central strip of true páramo has more open shrublands with low shrubs. Open areas contain Acaena cylindrostachya, Castilleja fissifolia and Lupinus carrikeri. Shrubs found in protected valleys and rocky slopes include Alchemilla polylepis (syn. Lachemilla polylepis), Simplocos nivalis and Obtegomeria caerulescens. Swamps and the margins of glacial lakes have clumps of Azorella crenata and rosettes of Hypochaeris sessiliflora. Water plants include Callitriche nubigena and Ranunculus limoseloides. The upper "superpáramo" has scattered tussocks of grass. There are patches of Raouliopsis seifrizii and Draba sanctae-marthae. Areas shielded from the wind hold Valeriana karstenii and Perissocaelum purdiei.

=== Fauna ===
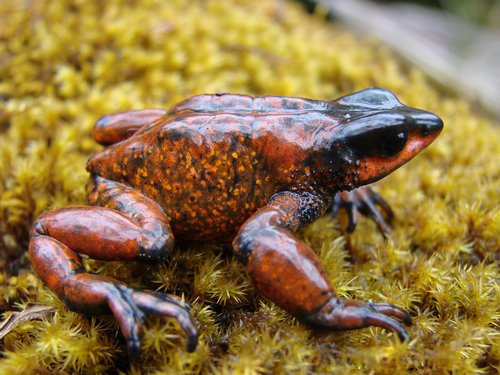
Guajira stubfoot toad (Atelopus carrikeri), a critically endangered endemic species

Endemic mammals include subspecies of the red brocket (Mazama americana carrikeri), and the cougar (Puma concolor bangsi). Endangered amphibians include Atelopus arsyecue, Guajira stubfoot toad (Atelopus carrikeri) and Boulenger's backpack frog (Cryptobatrachus boulengeri). Birds include the Andean condor (Vultur gryphus), rufous-collared sparrow (Zonotrichia capensis) and Jameson's snipe (Gallinago jamesoni). Endangered birds include the Santa Marta bush tyrant (Myiotheretes pernix), Santa Marta wren (Troglodytes monticola), and black-backed thornbill (Ramphomicron dorsale).

== Status ==
The World Wide Fund for Nature gives a status of "Relatively Stable/Intact". The páramo is expanding as the Andean forest at lower levels is cleared and the glaciers recede in the upper areas. The ecoregion is protected by the Sierra Nevada de Santa Marta National Park. The growing populations of Kogi, Arsario and Arhuaco indigenous people have reserves that cover parts of the páramo and have special rights within the park. They graze large herds of cattle and sheep up to elevations of 3,800 metres (12,500 ft), and hunt cougars and condors to protect their livestock. They extract wood for fuel and building. In the subpáramo they have expanded the scrublands by burning and grow potatoes and onions. These changes reduce biodiversity, change the balance of vegetation and increase erosion.

== Sources ==
- IUCN SSC Amphibian Specialist Group (2017). "Atelopus carrikeri". IUCN Red List of Threatened Species. 2017 e.T54496A49534770. doi:10.2305/IUCN.UK.2017-3.RLTS.T54496A49534770.en.
- Carbono, Eduino, Northern South America: Northern Colombia (NT1007), WWF: World Wildlife Fund
- Londoño, Camilo; Cleef, Antoine; Madriñán, Santiago (February 2014), "Angiosperm flora and biogeography of the páramo region of Colombia, Northern Andes" (PDF), Flora - Morphology, Distribution, Functional Ecology of Plants, 209 (2), Elsevier, doi:10.1016/j.flora.2013.11.006
- Luteyn, James L., Páramo ecosystem, Missouri Botanical Garden
- Northern Andean Paramo, WWF Global, archived from the original on 2017-02-05
- "Santa Marta páramo", Global Species, Myers Enterprises II
- WildFinder, WWF: World Wildlife Fund
- Worboys, Graeme; Francis, Wendy L.; Lockwood, Michael (2010), Connectivity Conservation Management: A Global Guide (with Particular Reference to Mountain Connectivity Conservation), Earthscan, ISBN 978-1-84407-603-1
