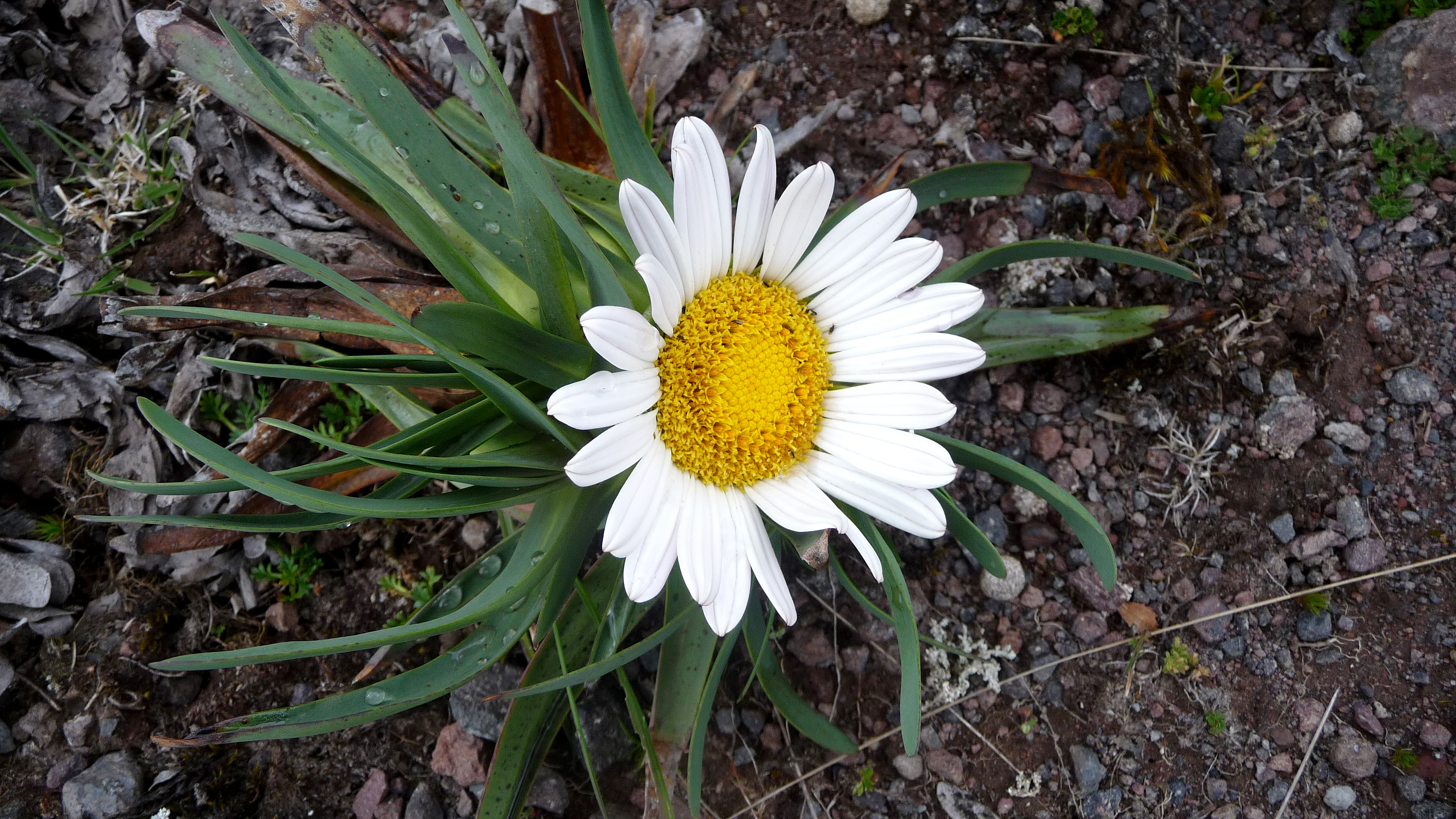
- Werneria nubigena

Scientific classification
- Kingdom: Plantae
- Clade: Tracheophytes
- Clade: Angiosperms
- Clade: Eudicots
- Clade: Asterids
- Order: Asterales
- Family: Asteraceae
- Subfamily: Asteroideae
- Tribe: Senecioneae
- Genus: Werneria; Kunth

Type species
- Werneria nubigena Kunth

= Werneria (plant) =

Genus of plants

Werneria is a genus of South American plants in the groundsel tribe within the sunflower family.

Species accepted by the Plants of the World Online as of December 2022:

- Werneria acerosa Cuatrec.
- Werneria amblydactyla S.F.Blake
- Werneria apiculata Sch.Bip.
- Werneria aretioides Wedd.
- Werneria caespitosa Wedd.
- Werneria canaliculata Sch.Bip.
- Werneria carnulosa A.Gray
- Werneria castroviejoi J.Calvo & H.Beltrán
- Werneria ciliolata A.Gray
- Werneria cochlearis Griseb.
- Werneria cornea S.F.Blake
- Werneria crassa S.F.Blake
- Werneria dactylophylla Sch.Bip.
- Werneria decora S.F.Blake
- Werneria digitata Wedd.
- Werneria esquilachensis Cuatrec.
- Werneria glaberrima Phil.
- Werneria glandulosa Wedd.
- Werneria graminifolia Kunth
- Werneria huascarana J.Calvo, H.Beltrán & Trinidad
- Werneria humilis Kunth
- Werneria incisa Phil.
- Werneria juniperina Hieron.
- Werneria lanatifolia J.Calvo & R.I.Meneses
- Werneria marcida S.F.Blake
- Werneria microphylla H.Beltrán & S.Leiva
- Werneria nubigena Kunth
- Werneria orbignyana Wedd.
- Werneria pectinata Lingelsh.
- Werneria pinnatifida J.Rémy
- Werneria plantaginifolia Wedd. ex Klatt
- Werneria poposa Phil.
- Werneria pseudodigitata Rockh.
- Werneria pumila Kunth
- Werneria pygmaea Gillies ex Hook. & Arn.
- Werneria rigida Kunth
- Werneria rockhauseniana H.Beltrán, Trinidad & J.Calvo
- Werneria rosea Hieron.
- Werneria rosenii R.E.Fr.
- Werneria solivifolia Sch.Bip.
- Werneria sotarensis Hieron.
- Werneria spathulata Wedd.
- Werneria staffordiae Sandwith
- Werneria staticifolia Sch.Bip.
- Werneria villosa A.Gray
- Werneria weberbaueriana Rockh.
- Werneria weddellii Phil.

Several species once included in Werneria are now considered as better suited to other genera: Cremanthodium, Euryops, Hypochaeris, Misbrookea, Senecio, and Xenophyllum.

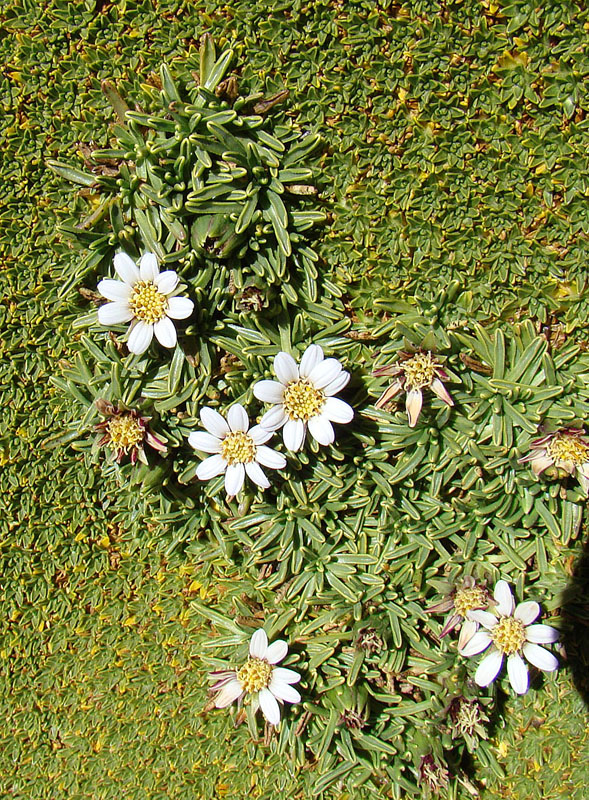
Werneria pygmaea

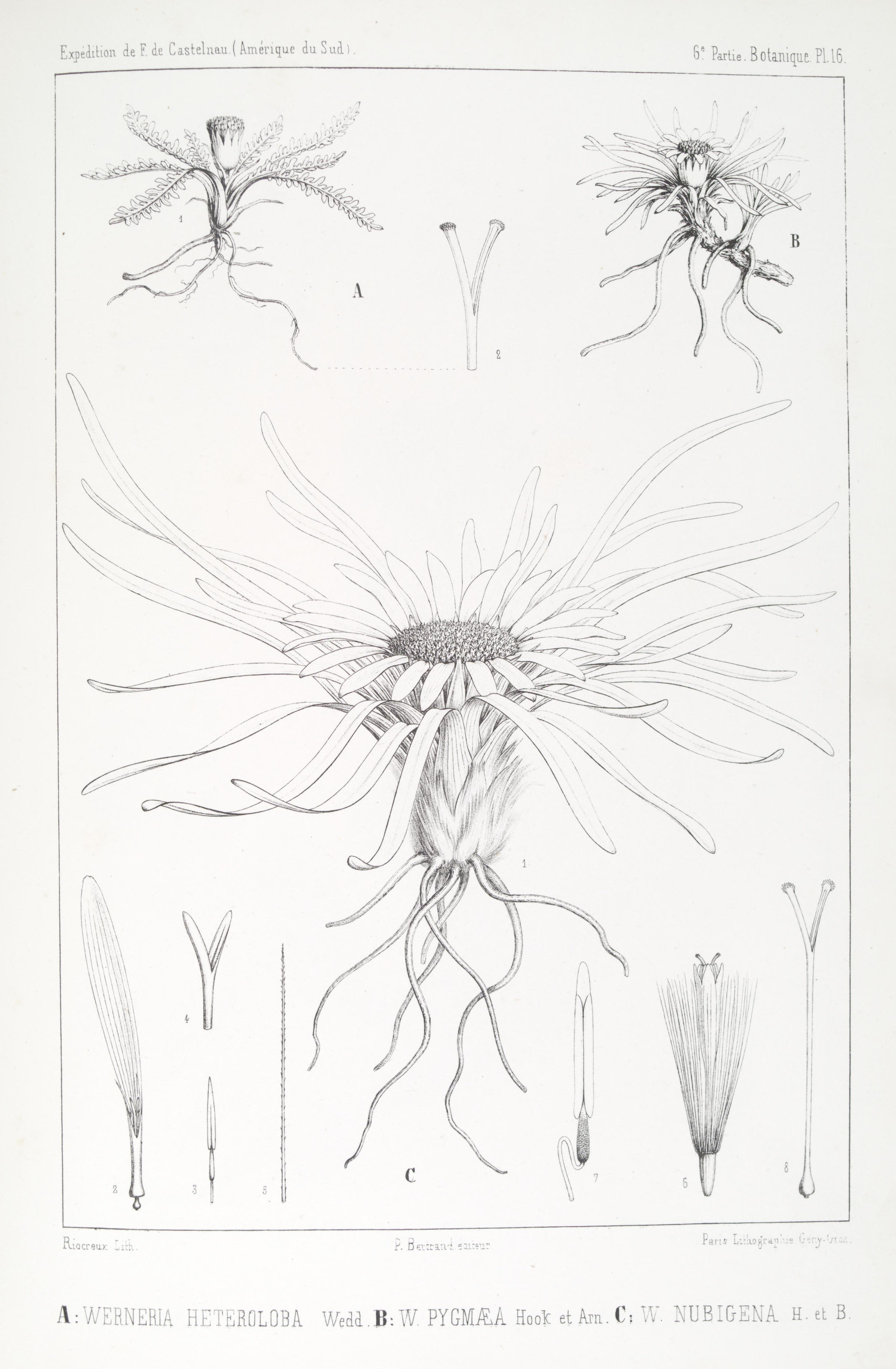
Werneria heteroloba

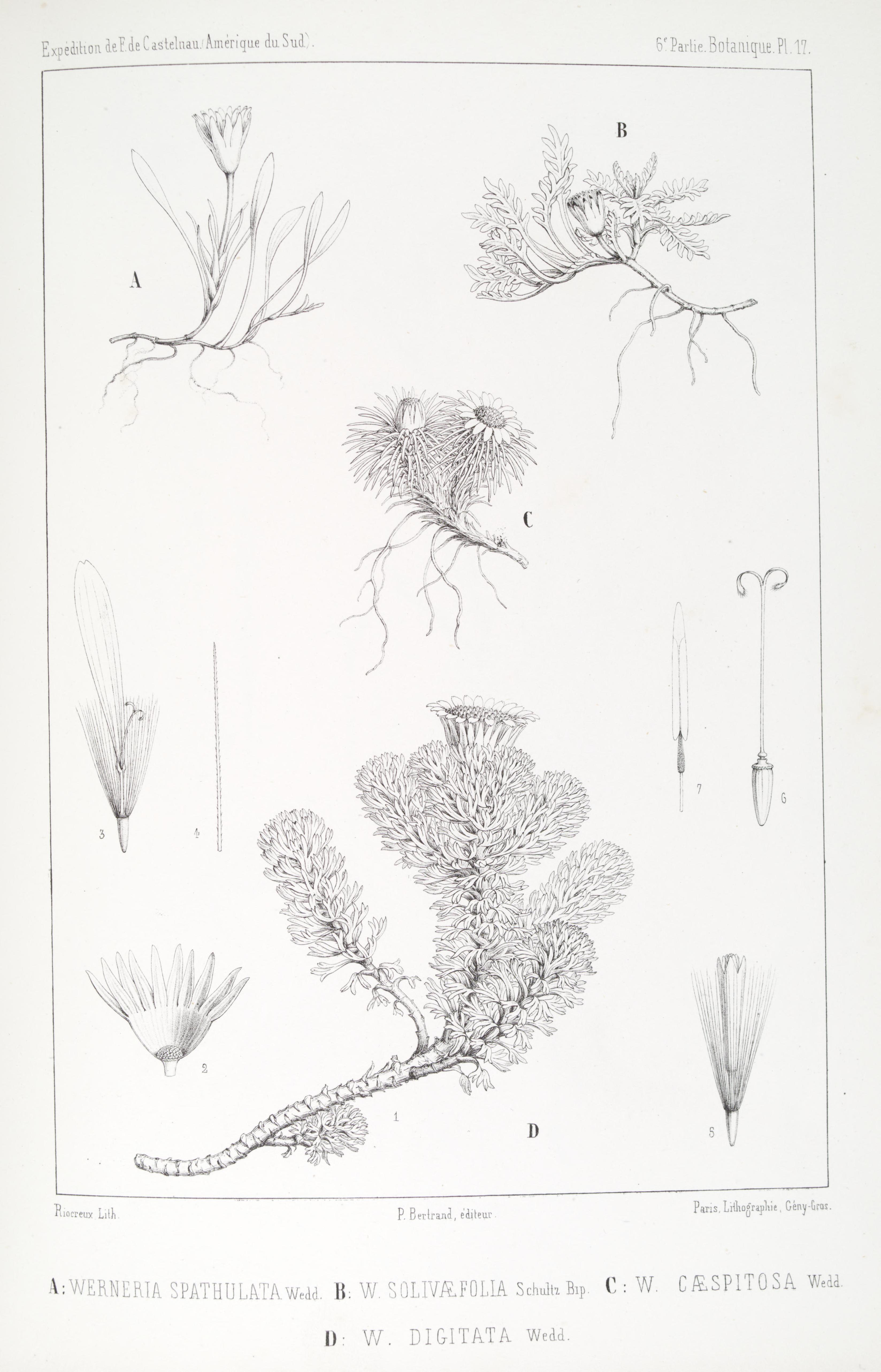
Werneria spathulata
