= Serranobatrachus =

Scientific classification
- Kingdom: Animalia
- Phylum: Chordata
- Class: Amphibia
- Order: Anura
- Clade: Brachycephaloidea
- Family: Craugastoridae
- Subfamily: Pristimantinae
- Genus: Serranobatrachus; Arroyo, Targino, Rueda-Solano, Daza-R., and Grant, 2022

Type species
- Eleutherodactylus insignitus Ruthven, 1917

Genus of amphibians

Serranobatrachus is a genus of frogs in the family Strabomantidae. They are endemic to the cloud forests and páramo of the Sierra Nevada de Santa Marta, Magdalena, Colombia.

== Species ==
The following species are recognised in the genus Serranobatrachus:

- Serranobatrachus carmelitae (Ruthven, 1922)
- Serranobatrachus cristinae (Lynch and Ruiz-Carranza, 1985)
- Serranobatrachus delicatus (Ruthven, 1917)
- Serranobatrachus insignitus (Ruthven, 1917)
- Serranobatrachus megalops (Ruthven, 1917)
- Serranobatrachus ruthveni (Lynch and Ruiz-Carranza, 1985)
- Serranobatrachus sanctaemartae (Ruthven, 1917)
