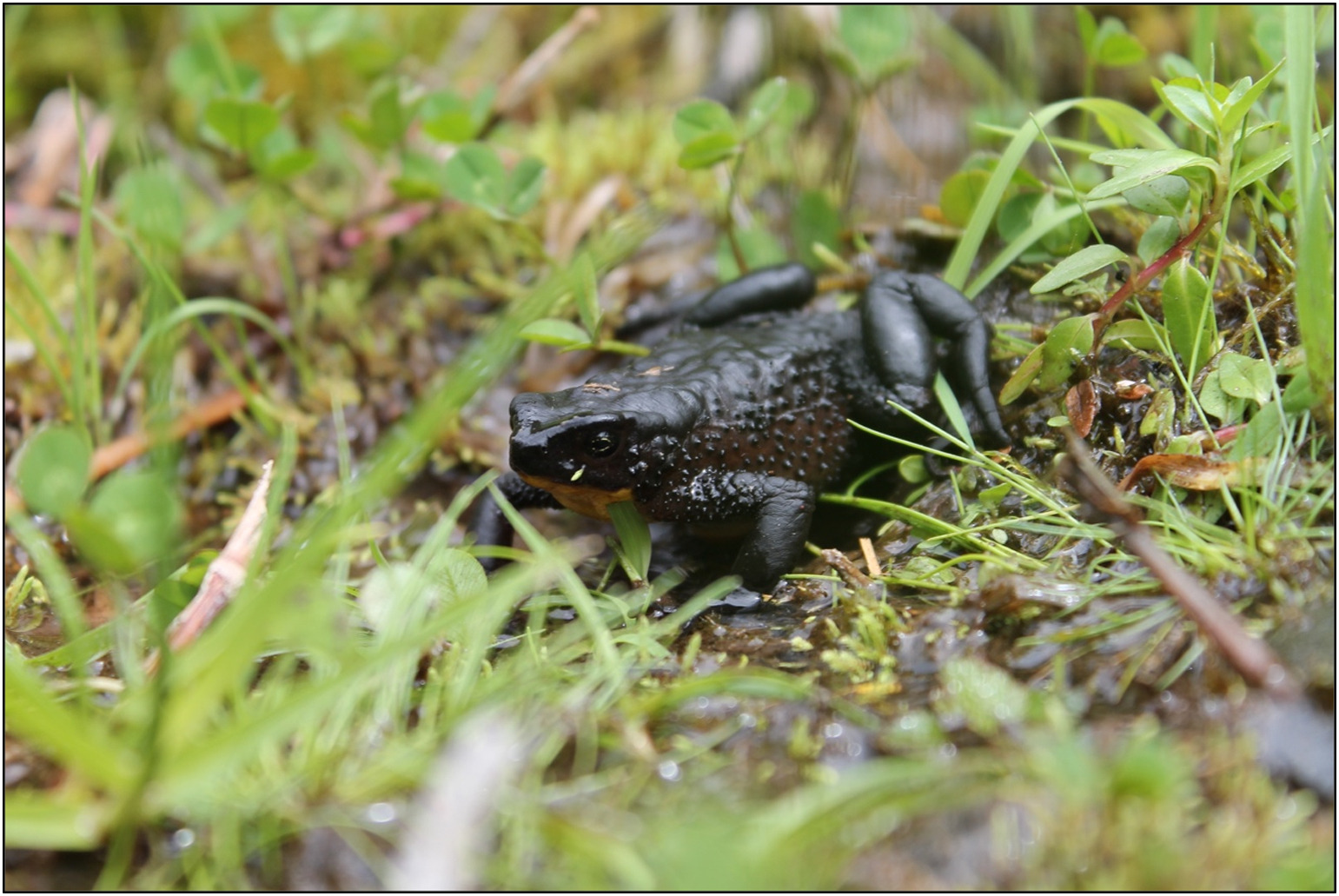

Conservation status
- Critically Endangered (IUCN 3.1)

Scientific classification
- Kingdom: Animalia
- Phylum: Chordata
- Class: Amphibia
- Order: Anura
- Family: Bufonidae
- Genus: Atelopus
- Species: A. ignescens

Binomial name
- Atelopus ignescens (Cornalia, 1849)

Synonyms
- Phryniscus ignescens Cornalia, 1849; Phryniscus laevis Günther, 1858; Atelopus carinatus Andersson, 1945

= Atelopus ignescens =

Species of amphibian

Atelopus ignescens, the Jambato toad or Quito stubfoot toad or Jambato harlequin frog, is a species of toad in the family Bufonidae. It is endemic to the northern Andes of Ecuador. This once abundant species was believed to be extinct until its rediscovery in 2016. The specific name ignescens means "to catch fire," presumably in reference to the orange ventral color of this species.

== Taxonomy ==
A closely related, perhaps undescribed species might exist in Colombia. Alexander G. Ruthven believed Atelopus ignescens to be the closest relative of the Guajira stubfoot toad (Atelopus carrikeri). Later studies have indicated that its closest relative is an undescribed species from central Ecuador (Bolívar and Chimborazo Provinces).

== Description ==
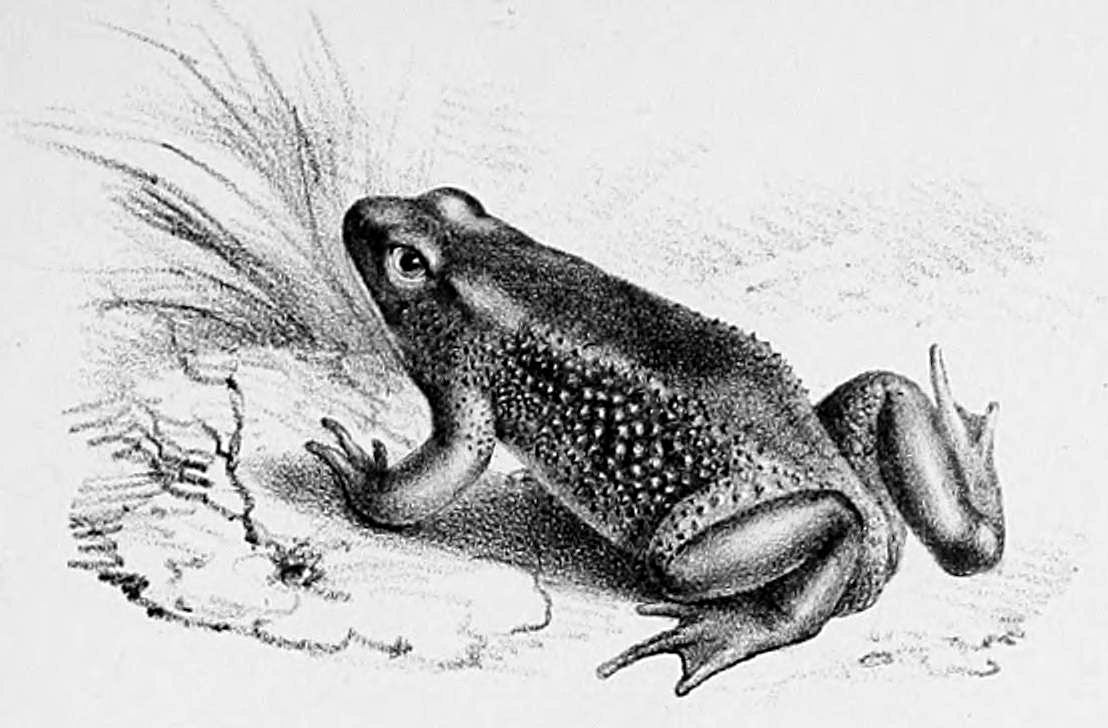
Original drawing by Albert Charles Lewis Günther in 1858

Adult females measure between 36–48 mm (1.4–1.9 in) in snout–vent length, with males measuring from 34–41 mm (1.3–1.6 in). The body is robust with long limbs and truncate snout. The dorsal coloration is uniformly black, as is the iris. The ventral side is orange-red; the belly is lighter in color, suffused with yellow.

== Conservation ==
With the last recorded sighting dating to 1988, the species was thought to be extinct until early 2016, when a relict population was identified in the rural parish of Angamarca, Cotopaxi, Ecuador.

Atelopus ignescens was formerly abundant along streams, rivers and ponds of the páramo surrounding the Ecuadorian capital city of Quito. The species started to decline in the 1980s, probably due to the chytridiomycosis that ravaged other amphibian species around the world, and prior to its rediscovery had been listed as extinct by the IUCN. Other threats include habitat destruction, pollution, climate change, and invasive rainbow trout.
