= Serranobatrachus delicatus =

Conservation status
- Endangered (IUCN 3.1)

Scientific classification
- Kingdom: Animalia
- Phylum: Chordata
- Class: Amphibia
- Order: Anura
- Family: Strabomantidae
- Genus: Serranobatrachus
- Species: S. delicatus

Binomial name
- Serranobatrachus delicatus (Ruthven, 1917)

Synonyms
- Eleutherodactylus delicatus Ruthven, 1917; Pristimantis delicatus (Ruthven, 1917)

Species of frog

Serranobatrachus delicatus is a species of frog in the family Strabomantidae. It is endemic to the Sierra Nevada de Santa Marta, Colombia, and is only known from the Magdalena Department. Common name delicate robber frog has been coined for this species.

== Description ==
Serranobatrachus delicatus is a small frog; one female measured 28 mm (1.1 in) in snout–vent length. The body is elongate. The snout is moderately elongate and rounded in profile. The tympanum is small but distinct. The canthus rostralis is definite and angular. The fingers and toes are long; the fingers are unwebbed whereas the toes have some webbing.

== Habitat and conservation ==
Serranobatrachus delicatus is an arboreal frog inhabiting cloud forests at elevations of 1,500–2,600 m (4,900–8,500 ft) above sea level. It has been found in bromeliads as well as among leaves on the forest floor. Eggs have been found at the base of the outside leaves of bromeliads growing on the ground. Development is direct: eggs hatch directly as froglets.

Population trends of this rare and little-known species are unknown but habitat destruction and degradation are threats to it. Its range includes the Sierra Nevada de Santa Marta National Natural Park.
