= Werneria graminifolia =

Conservation status
- Vulnerable (IUCN 3.1)

Scientific classification
- Kingdom: Plantae
- Clade: Tracheophytes
- Clade: Angiosperms
- Clade: Eudicots
- Clade: Asterids
- Order: Asterales
- Family: Asteraceae
- Genus: Werneria
- Species: W. graminifolia

Binomial name
- Werneria graminifolia Kunth

Species of flowering plant

Werneria graminifolia is a species of flowering plant in the family Asteraceae. It is found only in Ecuador. Its natural habitat is subtropical or tropical high-altitude grassland. It is threatened by habitat loss.
