= Serranobatrachus carmelitae =

Conservation status
- Endangered (IUCN 3.1)

Scientific classification
- Kingdom: Animalia
- Phylum: Chordata
- Class: Amphibia
- Order: Anura
- Family: Strabomantidae
- Genus: Serranobatrachus
- Species: S. carmelitae

Binomial name
- Serranobatrachus carmelitae (Ruthven, 1922)

Synonyms
- Eleutherodactylus carmelitae Ruthven, 1922; Pristimantis carmelitae (Ruthven, 1922)

Species of frog

Serranobatrachus carmelitae, also known as Carmelita's robber frog, is a species of frog in the family Strabomantidae. It is endemic to the north-western slopes of the Sierra Nevada de Santa Marta, in northern Colombia. Its natural habitats are tropical riparian forests. It is threatened by habitat loss.
