= Serranobatrachus megalops =

Conservation status
- Near Threatened (IUCN 3.1)

Scientific classification
- Kingdom: Animalia
- Phylum: Chordata
- Class: Amphibia
- Order: Anura
- Family: Strabomantidae
- Genus: Serranobatrachus
- Species: S. megalops

Binomial name
- Serranobatrachus megalops (Ruthven, 1917)

Synonyms
- Eleutherodactylus megalops Ruthven, 1917; Pristimantis megalops (Ruthven, 1917)

Species of frog

Serranobatrachus megalops is a species of frog in the family Strabomantidae. Its common name is San Lorenzo robber frog. It is endemic to the northwestern slopes of Sierra Nevada de Santa Marta, northern Colombia. It occurs in cloud forest areas where it is found in closed-canopy secondary forests, riparian forests, and pine plantations. It is a very common, terrestrial frog that can be found on fallen leaves and under rocks and logs. It is threatened by habitat loss.
