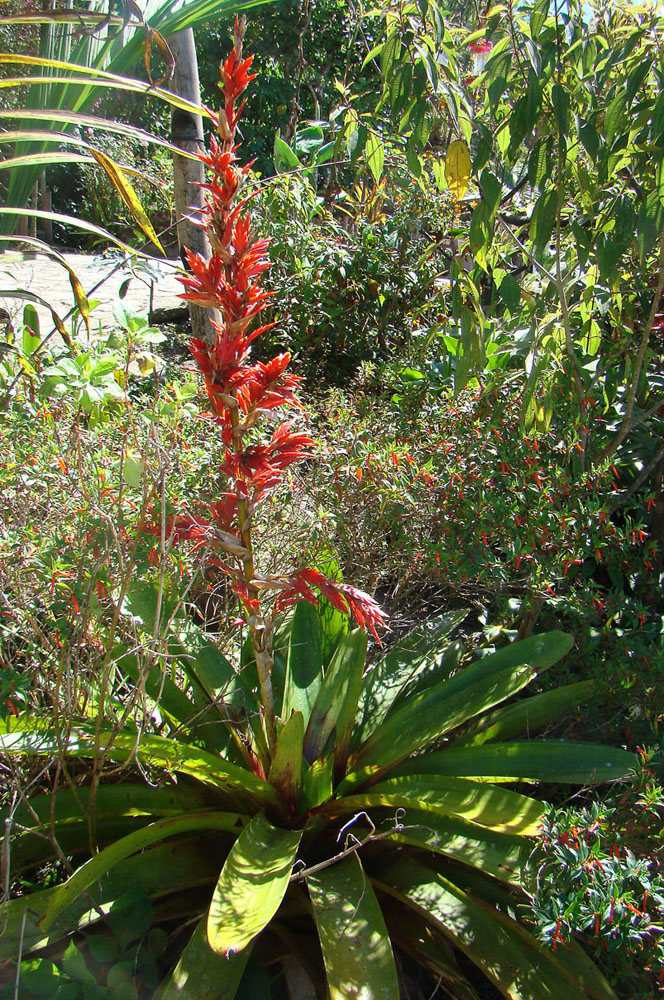
- Vriesea elata in El Dorado, Santa Marta, Colombia. Source: (c) Dick Culbert 2014, CC-BY

Scientific classification
- Kingdom: Plantae
- Clade: Tracheophytes
- Clade: Angiosperms
- Clade: Monocots
- Clade: Commelinids
- Order: Poales
- Family: Bromeliaceae
- Genus: Vriesea
- Species: V. elata

Binomial name
- Vriesea elata (Baker) L.B.Sm.

Synonyms
- Tillandsia elata Baker; Tillandsia exaltata Mez

= Vriesea elata =

Species of plant

Vriesea elata is a species of flowering plant in the Bromeliaceae family. It is an epiphyte native to Venezuela, Colombia, and Ecuador.

== Cultivars ==
- Vriesea 'Grande'
