= Serranobatrachus sanctaemartae =

Conservation status
- Near Threatened (IUCN 3.1)

Scientific classification
- Kingdom: Animalia
- Phylum: Chordata
- Class: Amphibia
- Order: Anura
- Clade: Brachycephaloidea
- Family: Craugastoridae
- Genus: Serranobatrachus
- Species: S. sanctaemartae

Binomial name
- Serranobatrachus sanctaemartae (Ruthven, 1917)

Synonyms
- Eleutherodactylus sanctaemartae Ruthven, 1917; Pristimantis sanctaemartae (Ruthven, 1917)

Species of frog

Serranobatrachus sanctaemartae is a species of frog in the family Strabomantidae. It is endemic to the Sierra Nevada de Santa Marta, northern Colombia. Its natural habitats are tropical moist montane forests and rivers. It is threatened by habitat loss.
