= Serranobatrachus cristinae =

Conservation status
- Endangered (IUCN 3.1)

Scientific classification
- Kingdom: Animalia
- Phylum: Chordata
- Class: Amphibia
- Order: Anura
- Clade: Brachycephaloidea
- Family: Craugastoridae
- Genus: Serranobatrachus
- Species: S. cristinae

Binomial name
- Serranobatrachus cristinae (Lynch & Ruíz-Carranza, 1985)

Synonyms
- Eleutherodactylus cristinae Lynch & Ruíz-Carranza, 1985; Pristimantis cristinae (Lynch & Ruíz-Carranza, 1985)

Species of amphibian

Serranobatrachus cristinae is a species of frog in the family Strabomantidae. It is endemic to Colombia. Its natural habitats are tropical moist montane forests and rivers. It is threatened by habitat loss.
