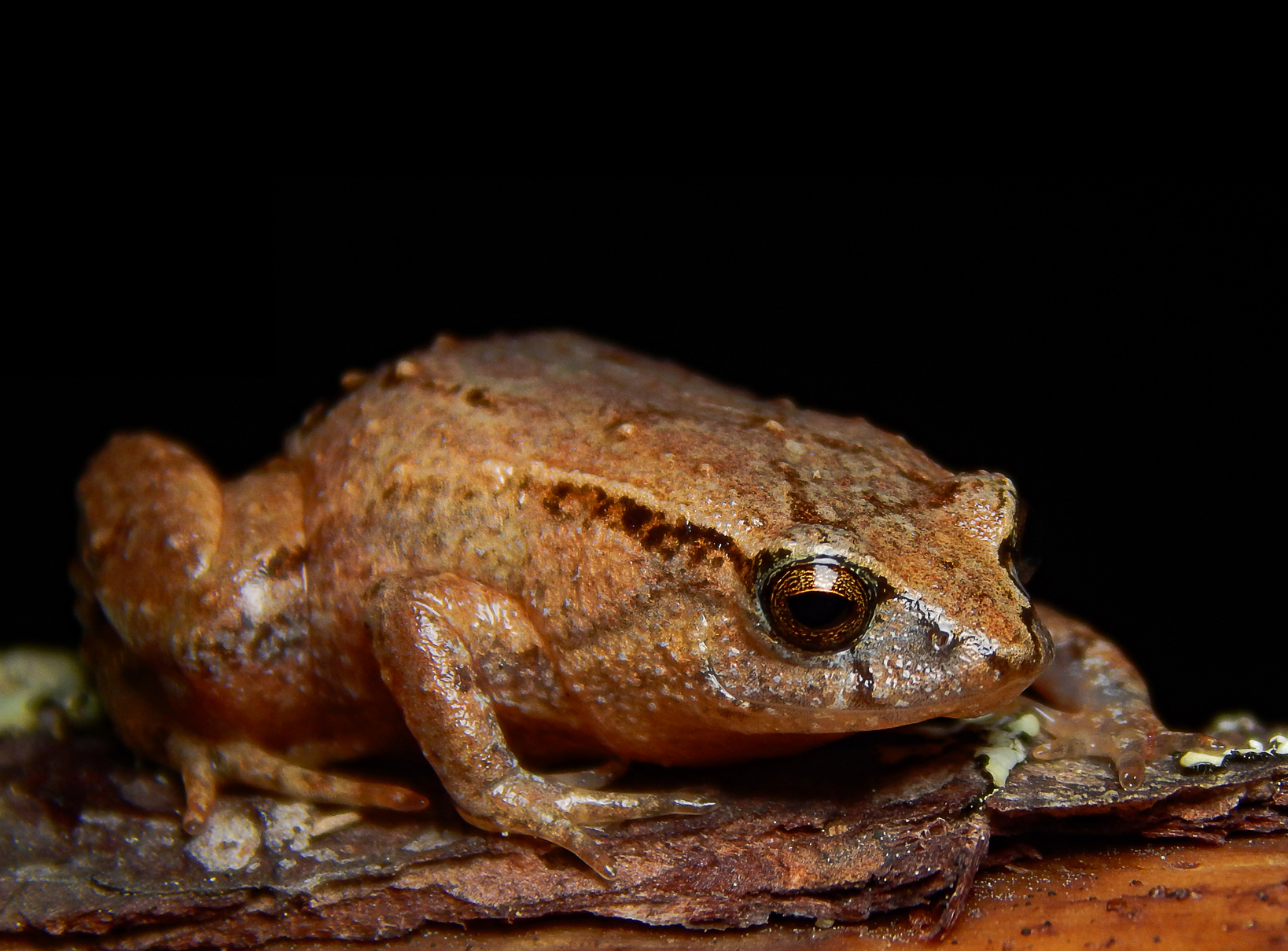
- Geobatrachus walkeri in Santa Marta, Colombia

Conservation status
- Endangered (IUCN 3.1)

Scientific classification
- Kingdom: Animalia
- Phylum: Chordata
- Class: Amphibia
- Order: Anura
- Clade: Brachycephaloidea
- Genus: Geobatrachus; Ruthven, 1915
- Species: G. walkeri

Binomial name
- Geobatrachus walkeri Ruthven, 1915

= Geobatrachus walkeri =

Species of amphibian

Geobatrachus walkeri, commonly known as Walker's Sierra frog, is a species of brachycephaloid frog of uncertain affinity, being variously placed in families Craugastoridae, Brachycephalidae or Strabomantidae. It is the only species in the monotypic genus Geobatrachus. It is endemic to Sierra Nevada de Santa Marta, Colombia. Its natural habitat is subtropical or tropical moist montane forests. It is threatened by habitat loss.
