= Castanedia =

Conservation status
- Least Concern (IUCN 3.1)

Scientific classification
- Kingdom: Plantae
- Clade: Tracheophytes
- Clade: Angiosperms
- Clade: Eudicots
- Clade: Asterids
- Order: Asterales
- Family: Asteraceae
- Subfamily: Asteroideae
- Tribe: Eupatorieae
- Genus: Castanedia; R.M.King & H.Rob.
- Species: C. santamartensis

Binomial name
- Castanedia santamartensis R.M.King & H.Rob.

Synonyms
- Castenedia R.M.King & H.Rob., orth. var.

Genus of flowering plants

Castanedia is a monotypic genus of flowering plants in the daisy family, Asteraceae. It contains a single species, Castanedia santamartensis, a shrub endemic to the Sierra Nevada de Santa Marta of northeastern Colombia. It grows in montane moist forests from 2400 to 3250 meters elevation.

Both the genus and the species were circumscribed by Robert Merrill King and Harold Ernest Robinson in Phytologia vol.39 on page 58 in 1978.

The genus name of Castanedia is in honour of Rafael Romero Castañeda (1910–1973), who was a Colombian botanist and plant collector.
