= Raouliopsis =

Scientific classification
- Kingdom: Plantae
- Clade: Tracheophytes
- Clade: Angiosperms
- Clade: Eudicots
- Clade: Asterids
- Order: Asterales
- Family: Asteraceae
- Subfamily: Asteroideae
- Tribe: Gnaphalieae
- Genus: Raouliopsis; S.F.Blake

Type species
- Celaena, name proposed but not validly published Wedd.

Genus of plants

Raouliopsis is a genus of South American plants in the tribe Gnaphalieae within the family Asteraceae.

Species

- Raouliopsis pachymorpha (Wedd.) S.F.Blake - Venezuela, Colombia
- Raouliopsis seifrizii S.F.Blake - Magdalena region in Colombia
