= Serranobatrachus ruthveni =

Conservation status
- Endangered (IUCN 3.1)

Scientific classification
- Kingdom: Animalia
- Phylum: Chordata
- Class: Amphibia
- Order: Anura
- Family: Strabomantidae
- Genus: Serranobatrachus
- Species: S. ruthveni

Binomial name
- Serranobatrachus ruthveni (Lynch and Ruiz-Carranza, 1985)

Synonyms
- Eleutherodactylus ruthveni Lynch and Ruiz-Carranza, 1985; Pristimantis ruthveni (Lynch and Ruiz-Carranza, 1985)

Species of frog

Serranobatrachus ruthveni is a species of frog in the family Craugastoridae. It is endemic to the north-western slope of the Sierra Nevada de Santa Marta in the Magdalena Department, northern Colombia. The specific name ruthveni honors Alexander Grant Ruthven, an American herpetologist. Common name Ruthven's robber frog has been coined for this species.

== Description ==
Adult males measure 25–32 mm (1.0–1.3 in) and adult females 31–46 mm (1.2–1.8 in) in snout–vent length. The head is almost as wide as the body. The snout is long, subacuminate in dorsal view and round in profile. The tympanum is visible. The fingers and the toes are long and slender and bear feeble lateral keels and discs that are broader than they are long. No webbing is present. The dorsum is pinkish tan, gray, or pale orange with darker markings. There is a dark canthal-supratympanic stripe. The venter is dirty white and has gray spots. Males have an internal vocal sac.

== Habitat and conservation ==
Serranobatrachus ruthveni lives in moist forests and rocky high mountain habitats (subpáramo and páramo) at elevations of 1,500–3,800 m (4,900–12,500 ft) above sea level; it is more common in the latter types of habitats. It is associated with streams and the stream-side vegetation. Development is direct, without free-living tadpole stage.

This species is threatened by habitat loss and deterioration of its forest, páramo, and riparian habitats, primarily because of agricultural activities (slash-and-burn cultivation of crops and cattle raising). It occurs in the Sierra Nevada de Santa Marta National Natural Park as well as in the Fundación ProAves nature reserve El Dorado.
