= Serranobatrachus insignitus =

Conservation status
- Near Threatened (IUCN 3.1)

Scientific classification
- Kingdom: Animalia
- Phylum: Chordata
- Class: Amphibia
- Order: Anura
- Family: Strabomantidae
- Genus: Serranobatrachus
- Species: S. insignitus

Binomial name
- Serranobatrachus insignitus (Ruthven, 1917)

Synonyms
- Eleutherodactylus insignitus Ruthven, 1917; Pristimantis insignitus (Ruthven, 1917)

Species of frog

Serranobatrachus insignitus is a species of frog in the family Strabomantidae. Its common name is ground robber frog. It is endemic to the Sierra Nevada de Santa Marta, Colombia. Its natural habitats are cloud forests at elevations of 1,530–2,134 m (5,020–7,001 ft) asl. These frogs have been found under logs or rocks on roadsides, or when active, on top of rocks, logs or low vegetation, beside streams. It is threatened by habitat loss.
