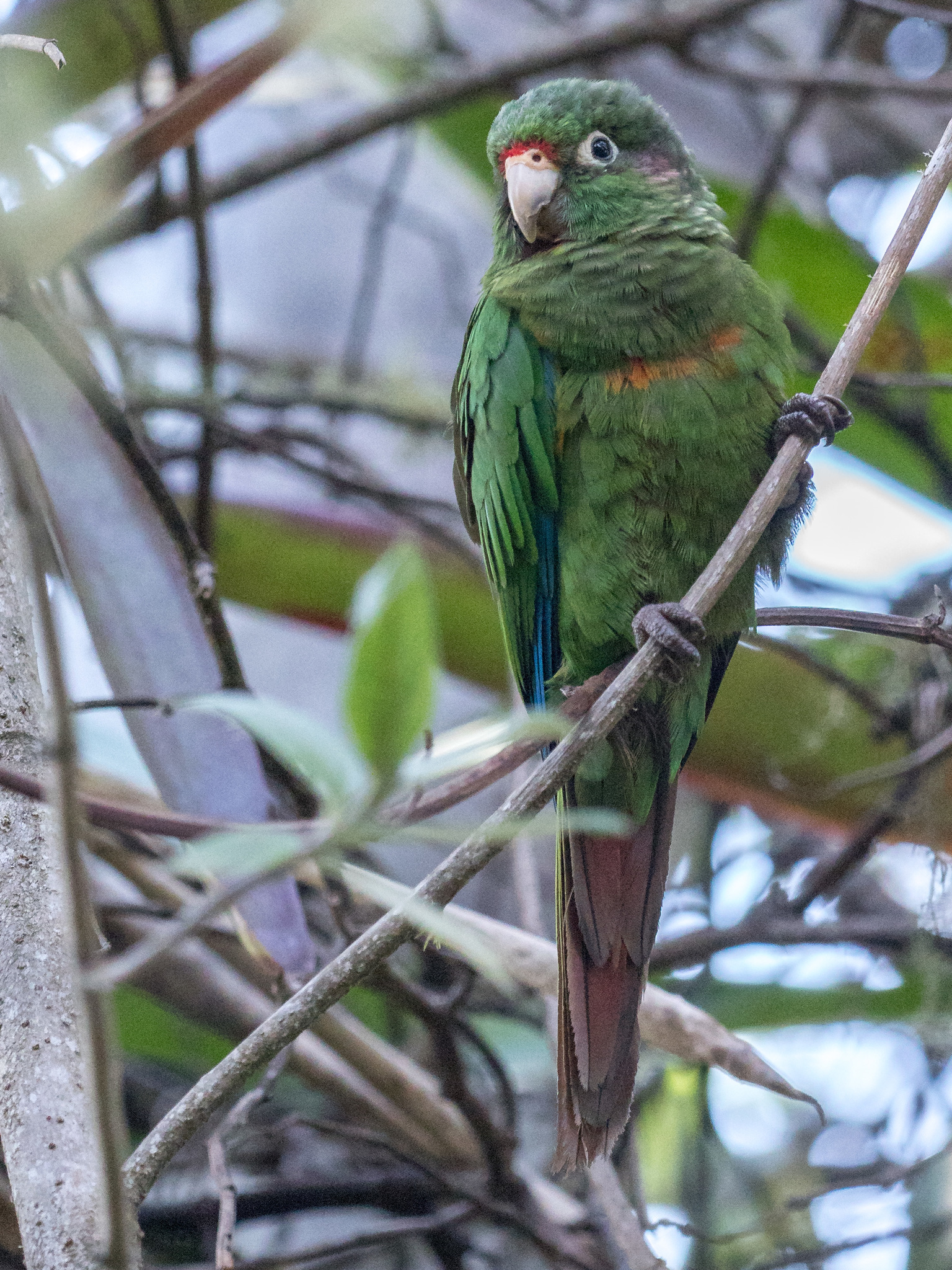

Conservation status
- Endangered (IUCN 3.1)

Scientific classification
- Kingdom: Animalia
- Phylum: Chordata
- Class: Aves
- Order: Psittaciformes
- Family: Psittacidae
- Genus: Pyrrhura
- Species: P. viridicata

Binomial name
- Pyrrhura viridicata Todd, 1913

= Santa Marta parakeet =

Species of bird

The Santa Marta parakeet (Pyrrhura viridicata) is an Endangered species of bird in subfamily Arinae of the family Psittacidae, the African and New World parrots. It is endemic to Colombia.

== Taxonomy and systematics ==
The Santa Marta parakeet's exact placement within genus Pyrrhura is unsure. The species is monotypic.

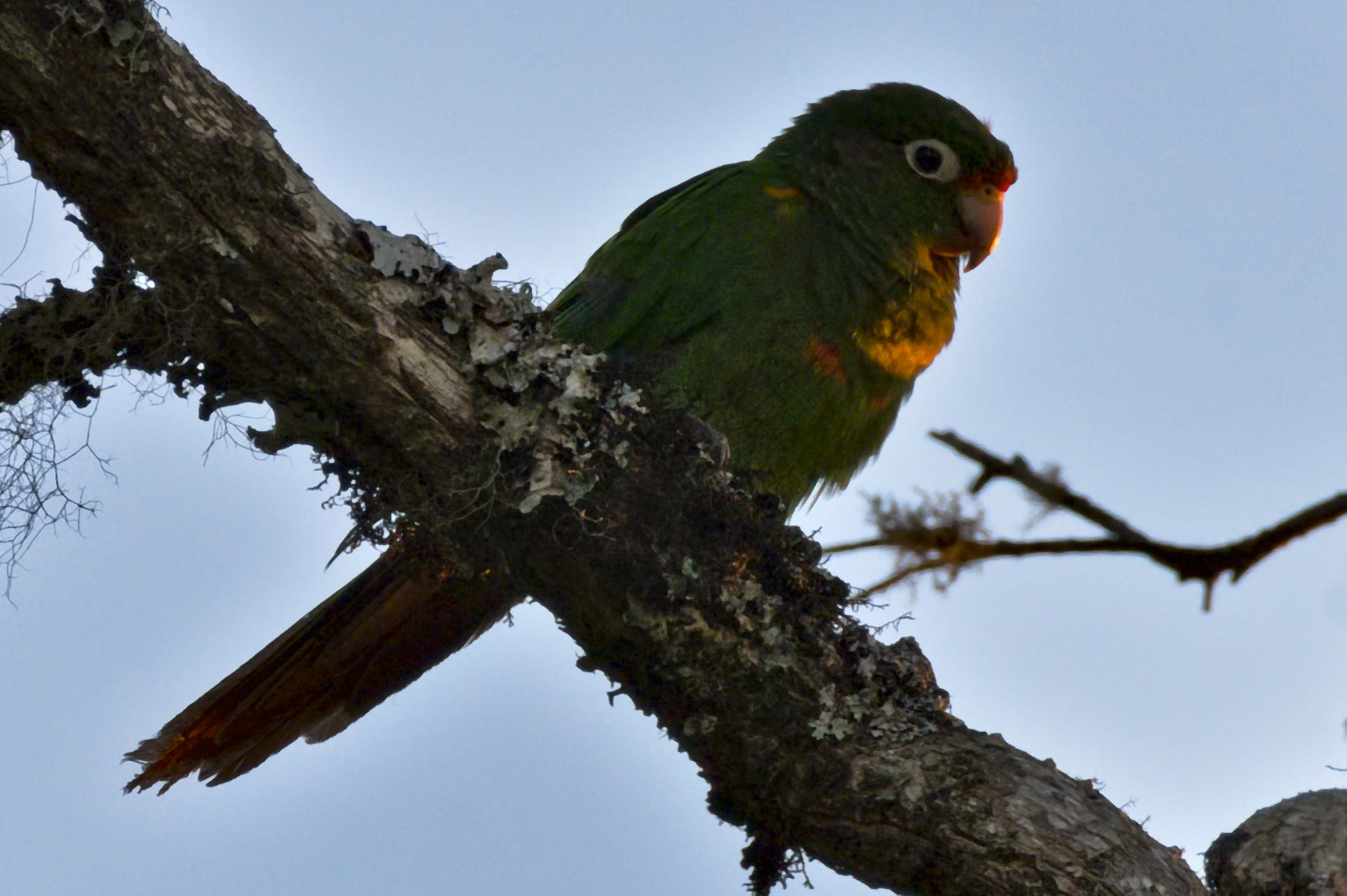
Santa Marta parakeet

== Description ==
The Santa Marta parakeet is 23 to 25 cm (9.1 to 9.8 in) long. The sexes are the same. Adults have a mostly green head with a red forehead and brownish ear coverts. Their upperparts are green. Their breast and upper belly have a scarlet "belt" and the rest of their underparts are green. Their wing is mostly green with yellow to orange upperwing and underwing coverts; their primaries are blue. Their tail is dull reddish. Immature birds are similar to adults but without the red belt on their underside.

== Distribution and habitat ==
The Santa Marta parakeet is found only in the Sierra Nevada de Santa Marta, an isolated mountain range in northern Colombia. Though it apparently was previously found on all sides of the range, it now appears to occur only along the north and northwestern slopes. It primarily inhabits humid pre-montane and montane forest, mostly in areas that receive at least 2,000 mm (79 in) of annual rainfall. It also less frequently occurs in secondary forest and cultivated areas. In elevation it ranges between 2,000 and 3,500 m (6,600 and 11,500 ft).

== Behavior ==
=== Movement ===
The Santa Marta parakeet does not migrate, but it is somewhat nomadic in response to the availability of its food sources.

== Feeding ==
The Santa Marta parakeet feeds on a variety of fruits and seeds, with the fruit of Croton bogotanus providing a major part of its diet. It also feeds on flowers, leaves, and lichens. It forages in flocks of up to about 20 individuals. Its diet varies over time with the changing abundance of its food, and it appears to use a wider variety of resources when its preferred food is not available. This behavior is interpreted to indicate some ecological flexibility.

=== Breeding ===
In a completely natural setting, the Santa Marta parakeet nests only in dead wax palms (Ceroxylon ceriferum); it also uses nest boxes placed in or near the forest. Most of the data on its breeding biology comes from monitoring nest boxes. The species has two breeding season peaks, between December and May and between June and October. The second season is thought to be a response to competition for nest cavities from larger parrot species. The clutch ranges from three to seven eggs with a mean of 4.5. The incubation period is 22 to 28 days and fledging occurs up to 45 days after hatch. The Santa Marta parakeet exhibits cooperative breeding.

=== Vocalization ===
The Santa Marta parakeet "uses screeching calls during flight".

== Status ==
The IUCN originally assessed the Santa Marta parakeet as Near Threatened, then in 1994 as Vulnerable, and since 2000 as Endangered. It has a limited range and its estimated population of between 1800 and 3200 mature individuals is believed to be decreasing. About half of its original habitat has been lost to plantations of non-native trees such as pine and Eucalyptus, and clearing for pasture continues. The species is hunted in some areas but that and the pet trade appear to be only minor influences on its decline. About 80% of the species' population appears to be in Sierra Nevada de Santa Marta National Natural Park though some occur in two private preserves. The protection of habitat in the national park is not fully effective.
