= Kirkbridea =

Scientific classification
- Kingdom: Plantae
- Clade: Tracheophytes
- Clade: Angiosperms
- Clade: Eudicots
- Clade: Rosids
- Order: Myrtales
- Family: Melastomataceae
- Genus: Kirkbridea; Wurdack

Genus of plants

Kirkbridea is a genus of flowering plants belonging to the family Melastomataceae.

It is endemic to the Sierra Nevada de Santa Marta of northern Colombia.

The genus name of Kirkbridea is in honour of Joseph Harold Kirkbride (b. 1943), an American botanist who worked at the United States National Arboretum and as a curator at the Department of Agriculture's herbarium. It was first described and published in Brittonia Vol.28 on page 141 in 1976.

Known species, according to Kew;

- Kirkbridea pentamera Wurdack
- Kirkbridea tetramera Wurdack
