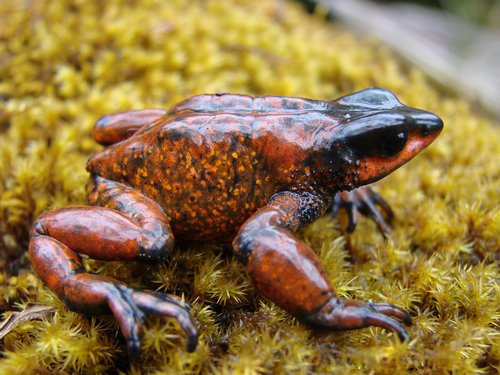

Conservation status
- Endangered (IUCN 3.1)

Scientific classification
- Kingdom: Animalia
- Phylum: Chordata
- Class: Amphibia
- Order: Anura
- Family: Bufonidae
- Genus: Atelopus
- Species: A. carrikeri

Binomial name
- Atelopus carrikeri Ruthven, 1916

Synonyms
- Atelopus leoperezii Ruiz-Carranza, Ardila-Robayo & Hernández-Camacho, 1994

= Guajira stubfoot toad =

Species of amphibian

The Guajira stubfoot toad or Carrikeri harlequin frog (Atelopus carrikeri) is a species of toad in the family Bufonidae. It is about 5 cm (2.0 in) long and typically black, though some populations have orange coloration. This species is endemic to the Sierra Nevada de Santa Marta mountain range of northern Colombia. It is critically endangered because of the chytrid fungus, Batrachochytrium dendrobatidis, and habitat destruction due to agriculture. The species had not been seen from 1994 until it was rediscovered in early 2008.

== Taxonomy ==
This species was initially described by Alexander G. Ruthven in 1916 from specimens collected by M. A. Carriker Jr., in 1914. In 1994, a new species, Atelopus leoperezii, was described, only to later be determined to be the Guajira stubfoot toad. Its closest relative is believed to be Atelopus ignescens of Ecuador.

== Description ==
The frog is about 5.0 cm long. It has at least two color phases, with the rarer orange population being the one recently rediscovered. However, the frog is typically all black, although it is a slightly lighter shade on its belly. In adults, the skin is smooth except for a patch of spiny warts on the side. The area that these warts cover varies, with some specimens displaying them from their eyes to their arms and others displaying it from their eyes to their femurs. One specimen even had the warts covering the entire body. The Guajira stubfoot toad has short legs with rounded fingers and toes. While its fingers are unwebbed, its toes are broadly webbed, though its first toe is distinct. Its head is as broad as it is long.

== Distribution and habitat ==
It is endemic to about 627 km^{2} (242.1 sq mi) in northern Colombia. Its natural habitats are sub-Andean and Andean cloud forests, and páramo. In addition, it is known to survive in snow-covered areas. It is found at elevations between 2,350 and 4,800 m. It can tolerate some habitat modification, but habitat loss caused by agriculture remains a threat.

== Ecology ==
This species lays its eggs in chains in freshwater mountain streams, where its tadpoles develop.

== Conservation ==
While the frog was common historically, it is currently endangered due to habitat loss from agriculture, climate change, crop fumigation, and, most significantly, the virulent chytrid fungus, Batrachochytrium dendrobatidis. This fungus was predicted to lower the population of the species by over 80%. This toad was rediscovered after an absence of 14 years by a Project Atelopus team in early 2008 in the Sierra Nevada de Santa Marta mountains of Magdalena, Colombia.
