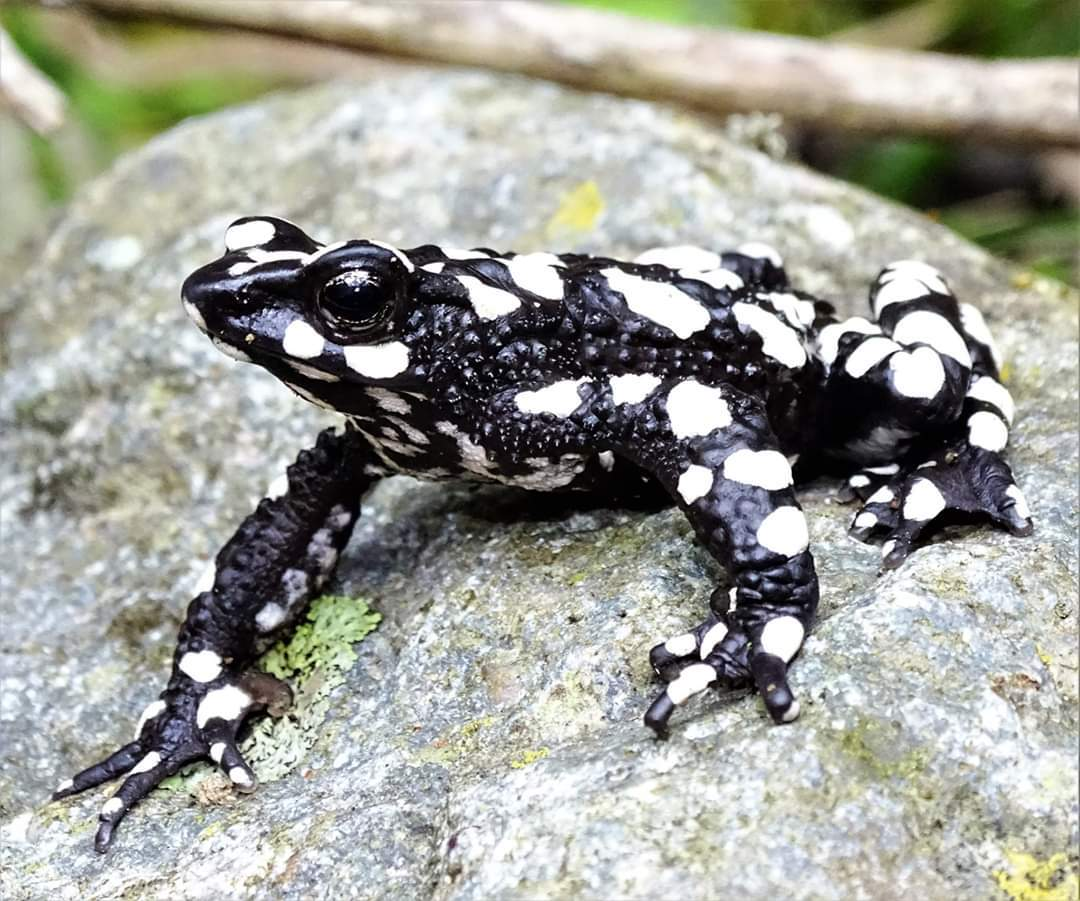

Conservation status
- Critically Endangered (IUCN 3.1)

Scientific classification
- Kingdom: Animalia
- Phylum: Chordata
- Class: Amphibia
- Order: Anura
- Family: Bufonidae
- Genus: Atelopus
- Species: A. arsyecue

Binomial name
- Atelopus arsyecue Rueda-Almonacid, 1994

= Starry night toad =

Species of amphibian

The starry night harlequin toad (Atelopus arsyecue) is a species of toad in the family Bufonidae endemic to the Sierra Nevada de Santa Marta, Colombia. Its natural habitats are sub-Andean and Andean forests, sub-páramo and páramo at 2,000–3,500 m (6,600–11,500 ft) above sea level. It is named after its unique coloration, being largely black with white spots.

Atelopus arsyecue is primarily threatened by habitat loss, with assumptions on decline by chytridiomycosis. Coupled with the inaccessibility of the preservation that the toad calls home, the species was feared extinct for over 30 years. However, its continued existence was known to the Arhuaco community in Sogrome, who referred to the animal as gouna and considered its habitat a sacred location. In 2019, the tribe consented to collaboration with researchers and showed them the living population, marking the first scientific documentation of this species in over 30 years.

== Anatomy and morphology ==
This diminutive toad is less than 5 cm (2 in) in length. The starry night toad's coloration consists of irregular white patches dappled across a black background. The white markings can present as separate spots or as an interconnected mosaic. Their skin texture is defined by even coverage of warts.

== Distribution and habitat ==
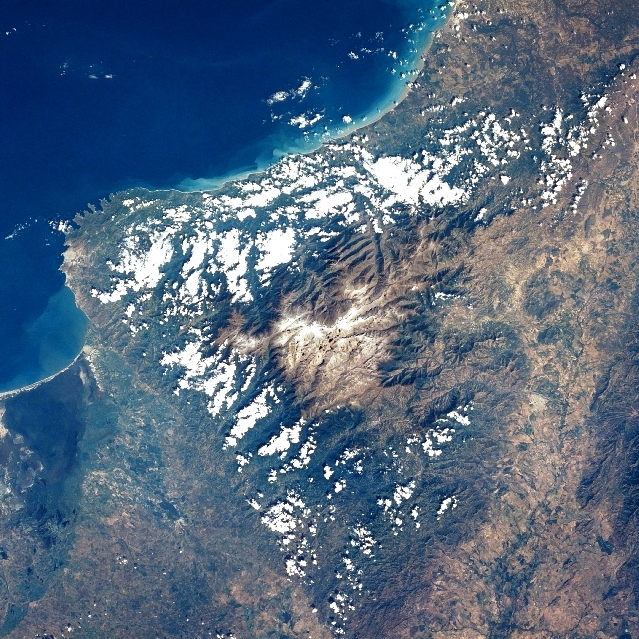
Sierra Nevada de Santa Marta, Colombia

Starry night harlequin toads seek habitat consisting of montane forest, high-altitude grasslands, and inland wetlands. As documented, the toad only occurs in a single defined location. Its range is specifically limited to the Sierra Nevada de Santa Marta National Park of Colombia, with an estimated extent of occurrence of 80 km² across the mountains. A. arsyecue seems to be exclusive to the sacred homelands of the Arhuaco people living in the Sogrome community. This area is primarily cloud forest with plentiful water resources as fed by high volumes of rainfall- which, consequently, has made the region ideal for agriculture. The toad is heavily reliant upon the integrity of the stream network running through the mountain range, both for its regular habitation and reproduction. Reproduction takes place in fast-flowing rivers, where chains of eggs are laid post-amplexus.

== Taxonomy ==
The genus Atelopus houses the harlequin toads, which are considered the most threatened amphibians in the world. It's presumed that the harlequin toads will ultimately be the first amphibian genus to lose all of its members to extinction. Starry night toads are one of ~130 Atelopus species presently described by science. 37% of these species are similar to the starry night toad in that they were presumed extinct, either by trending decline or missing data, but later found extant.

== Conservation ==
Habitat degradation is the primary limitation to the species' existence. As a synthesis of historical Incan practices and modern innovation, Andean agriculture is largely less invasive than conventional practices, but still has managed to render portions of vital habitat unusable by this organism. While concrete evidence of infection has yet to be found, chytridiomycosis is suspect for additional decline of the already vulnerable population. This virulent fungus has already been found at fault for sharp declines in other Colombian harlequin toad populations, such as Atelopus simulatus and Atelopus zeteki.

The starry night toad was last evaluated for the IUCN Red List in 2016. From this review, the species was listed as critically endangered. Prior to the groundbreaking 2019 expedition, the starry night harlequin toad was last documented in 1991; during the thirty-year interim period, it was assumed that this species would have followed the trend of other high-altitude harlequin toads in decline to the point of extinction.

In 2016, a conservationist living among the Sogrome community, Ruperto Chaparro Villafaña, approached scientists of the Fundación Atelopus, a partner of Global Wildlife Conservation that works to conserve threatened amphibians in the Colombian Caribbean. After nearly four years of communication between the two parties, it was agreed that the sacred grounds would be made accessible for inspection and documentation to benefit the toad, but on the condition that entering researchers would not take photographs of the animal. Expectations were greatly exceeded when the researchers allowed onto the lands were able to document not only one individual, but a healthy population of thirty.

A documentary published by AI Jazeera English provides exclusive detailing of the partnership between the researchers and the Arhuaco. The Arhuaco people want to see their intrinsic gouna species preserved for many generations to come, just as conservation science does.
