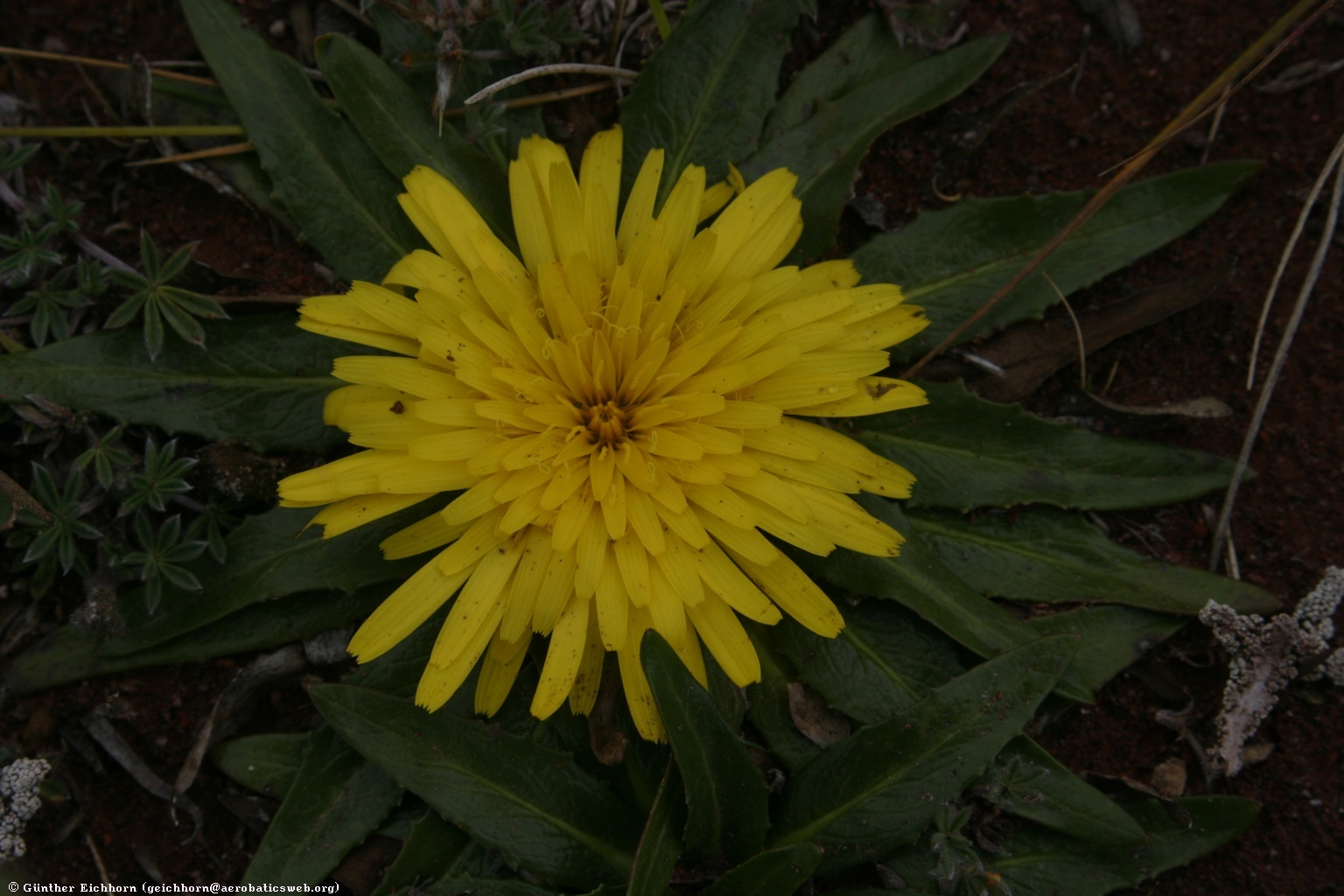
- Chikku chikku or cat's ear (Hypochaeris sessiliflora) on Cotopaxi, Ecuador

Scientific classification
- Kingdom: Plantae
- Clade: Tracheophytes
- Clade: Angiosperms
- Clade: Eudicots
- Clade: Asterids
- Order: Asterales
- Family: Asteraceae
- Genus: Hypochaeris
- Species: H. sessiliflora

Binomial name
- Hypochaeris sessiliflora Kunth 1818

Synonyms
- Synonymy: Achyrophorus albiflorus Sch.Bip.; Achyrophorus barbatus Sch.Bip.; Achyrophorus humboldtii Sch.Bip.; Achyrophorus quitensis Sch.Bip.; Achyrophorus sessiliflorus (Kunth) DC.; Achyrophorus sonchoides (Kunth) DC.; Hypochaeris barbata (Sch.Bip.) Reiche; Hypochaeris sonchoides] Kunth; Hypochaeris stuebelii Hieron.; Oreophila sessiliflora (Kunth) D.Don; Scorzonera quitensis Humb. ex Sch.Bip.; Scorzonera sessilis] Humb. ex Sch.Bip.; Werneria glandulosa Kunth

= Hypochaeris sessiliflora =

Species of flowering plant

Hypochaeris sessiliflora, the chikku chikku, is a South American species of plants in the family Asteraceae. It is a terrestrial herb of high Andean forest to high altitude páramo (2,500–4,500 m).

Hypochaeris sessiliflora is a small plant rarely more than 13 cm tall. Flowers are usually yellow or white, rarely purple or orange. Each head contains about 25 ray flowers but no disc flowers.

Distribution

- Colombia (South America)
- Ecuador (South America)
- Peru (South America)
- Venezuela (South America)
- Bolivia (South America)
