= Rhaebo olallai =

Conservation status
- Critically Endangered (IUCN 3.1)

Scientific classification
- Kingdom: Animalia
- Phylum: Chordata
- Class: Amphibia
- Order: Anura
- Family: Bufonidae
- Genus: Rhaebo
- Species: R. olallai

Binomial name
- Rhaebo olallai (Hoogmoed, 1985)

Synonyms
- Andinophryne olallai Hoogmoed, 1985

Species of amphibian

Rhaebo olallai is a species of toad in the family Bufonidae endemic to Ecuador. Its common name is Tandayapa Andes toad, after its type locality, Tandayapa, in the Pichincha Province); the species has not been seen there after 1970, despite search efforts. It is only known from another locality in the Imbabura Province of Ecuador (Manduriacu River). It has also been reported from one locality on the Colombian Massif, Nariño Department, Colombia, but these have been shown to represent Rhaebo colomai.

== Description ==
Rhaebo olallai are medium-sized toads: males measure 37–38 mm (1.5–1.5 in) and females 57–60 mm (2.2–2.4 in) in snout–vent length. Dorsum is coffee-coloured. The parotoid glands are enlarged and conspicuous. Flanks have conspicuous glands, distributed linearly or irregular patterns.

== Habitat and conservation ==
Its natural habitat are tropical premontane forests of western foothills of the Andes. All individuals of the Manduriacu River population were found near small forest streams, perched on branches or leaves, on average 1.4 metres (4 ft 7 in) but up to 4 metres (13 ft) over ground.

It is threatened by habitat loss caused by agriculture and logging, and by mining and hydropower. Only one population is known. The species is classified as "Critically Endangered".
