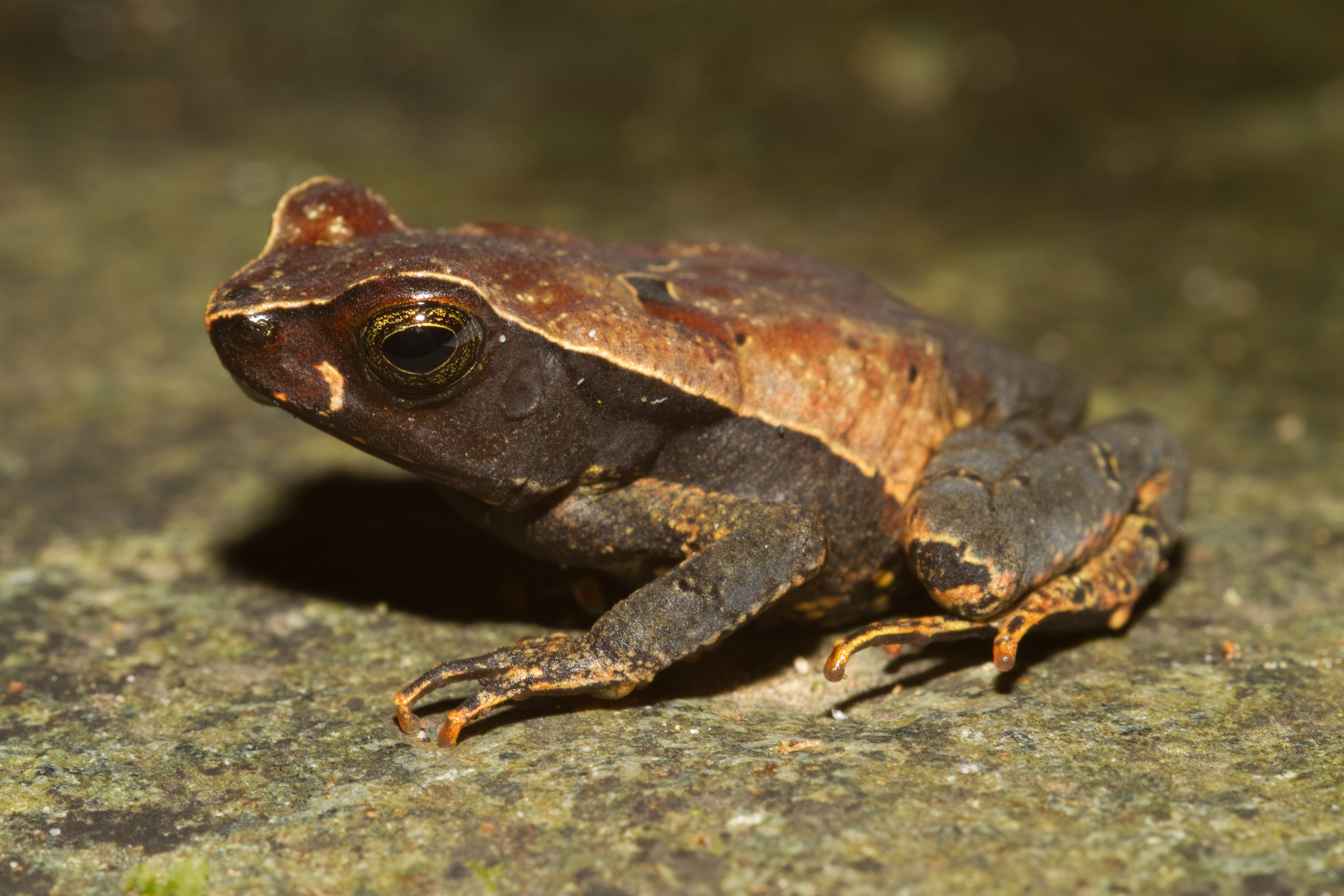

Conservation status
- Least Concern (IUCN 3.1)

Scientific classification
- Kingdom: Animalia
- Phylum: Chordata
- Class: Amphibia
- Order: Anura
- Family: Bufonidae
- Genus: Rhaebo
- Species: R. haematiticus

Binomial name
- Rhaebo haematiticus (Cope, 1862)

Synonyms
- Bufo haematiticus Cope, 1862

= Rhaebo haematiticus =

Species of amphibian

Rhaebo haematiticus (formerly Bufo haematiticus) is a species of toad in the family Bufonidae. It is found in eastern Honduras, Nicaragua, Costa Rica, Panama, Colombia, northwestern Venezuela (Serranía del Perijá), and northwestern Ecuador. Its altitudinal range is from sea level to 1,300 m (4,300 ft) asl. Its natural habitats are primary tropical moist forest and submontane humid forest. It is a nocturnal, leaf-litter species that during the breeding seasons is found along small streams and large rivers. It tolerates some habitat degradation but only occurs close to forest. Threats to it are habitat loss caused by agriculture, wood extraction, and cattle ranching, and locally oil pollution and dams.
