= Werner's toad =

Conservation status
- Least Concern (IUCN 3.1)

Scientific classification
- Kingdom: Animalia
- Phylum: Chordata
- Class: Amphibia
- Order: Anura
- Family: Bufonidae
- Genus: Rhaebo
- Species: R. nasicus

Binomial name
- Rhaebo nasicus (Werner, 1903)

Synonyms
- Bufo nasicus Werner, 1903

Species of amphibian

Werner's toad (Rhaebo nasicus, formerly Bufo nasicus; in Spanish sapo narigudo) is a species of toad in the family Bufonidae. It is found in northwestern Guyana and eastern Venezuela at elevations of 500–1,350 m (1,640–4,430 ft) asl.

== Description ==
Rhaebo nasicus is a medium-sized, long-legged toad. A male measured 41 mm (1.6 in) and two females 64 and 67 mm (2.5 and 2.6 in) in snout–vent length. The dorsal colouration is variable, from greyish brown to reddish brown. There are often darker spots, a dark brown hourglass patch, and/or an ochre middorsal stripe. Edge of lower jaw has a white stripe or row of white spots. Parotoid glands are moderately large. Upper eyelid is spiny. Snout is sharply pointed.

== Diet ==
Diet consists of ants, other arthropods (termites, beetles), and snails.

== Habitat and conservation ==
Its natural habitats are cloud forests and lowland moist forests. Breeding habitat is unknown.

It is a locally common species that is not facing major threats.
