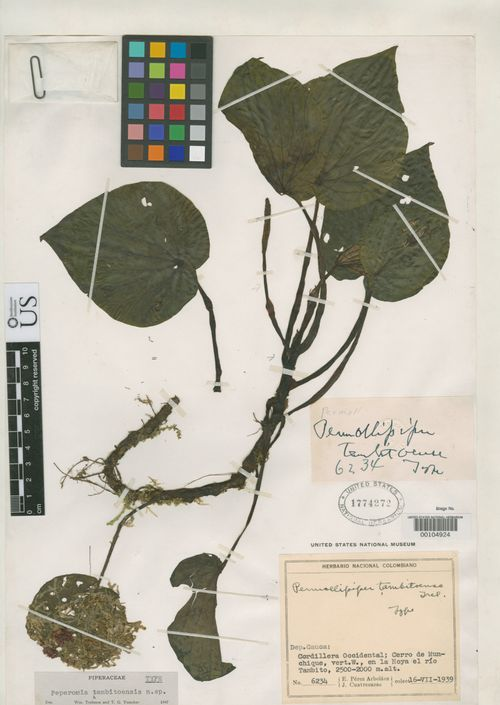

Scientific classification
- Kingdom: Plantae
- Clade: Embryophytes
- Clade: Tracheophytes
- Clade: Angiosperms
- Clade: Magnoliids
- Order: Piperales
- Family: Piperaceae
- Genus: Peperomia
- Species: P. tambitoensis

Binomial name
- Peperomia tambitoensis Trel. & Yunck.

= Peperomia tambitoensis =

Species of flowering plant

Peperomia tambitoensis is a species of flowering plant in the genus Peperomia. It was first described by William Trelease & Truman G. Yuncker and published in the book "The Piperaceae of northern South America 2: 475, f. 416. 1950". It primarily grows on wet tropical biomes. The species name came from Río Tambito Valley, where first specimens of this species were collected.

== Distribution ==
It is endemic to Colombia. First specimens where found at an altitude of 2000-2500 meters in Río Tambito Valley.

- Colombia
  - Cauca
    - Cordillera Occidental
    - El Tambo
