= Rhaebo hypomelas =

Conservation status
- Least Concern (IUCN 3.1)

Scientific classification
- Kingdom: Animalia
- Phylum: Chordata
- Class: Amphibia
- Order: Anura
- Family: Bufonidae
- Genus: Rhaebo
- Species: R. hypomelas

Binomial name
- Rhaebo hypomelas (Boulenger, 1913)

Synonyms
- Bufo hypomelas Boulenger, 1913

Species of amphibian

Rhaebo hypomelas is a species of toad in the family Bufonidae. It is endemic to Colombia and known from the Chocó region in the departments of Antioquia, Chocó, Risaralda, Valle del Cauca, and Cauca, at elevations of 10–1,600 m (33–5,249 ft) asl. There are also reports from Ecuador but these are not considered valid. Its natural habitats are lowland tropical moist forests. It is a terrestrial species living in leaf litter near water. It is a rare species that is threatened by habitat loss.
