= Western Andes toad =

Conservation status
- Critically Endangered (IUCN 3.1)

Scientific classification
- Kingdom: Animalia
- Phylum: Chordata
- Class: Amphibia
- Order: Anura
- Family: Bufonidae
- Genus: Rhaebo
- Species: R. atelopoides

Binomial name
- Rhaebo atelopoides (Lynch and Ruíz-Carranza, 1981)

Synonyms
- Bufo atelopoides Lynch and Ruiz-Carranza, 1981; Andinophryne atelopoides (Lynch and Ruíz-Carranza, 1981)

Species of amphibian

The Western Andes toad (Rhaebo atelopoides) is a species of toad in the family Bufonidae endemic to Colombia, where it is only known from the type locality in the Munchique National Natural Park, on the western slope of the Cordillera Occidental, Cauca. Its natural habitat is primary Andean forest.
