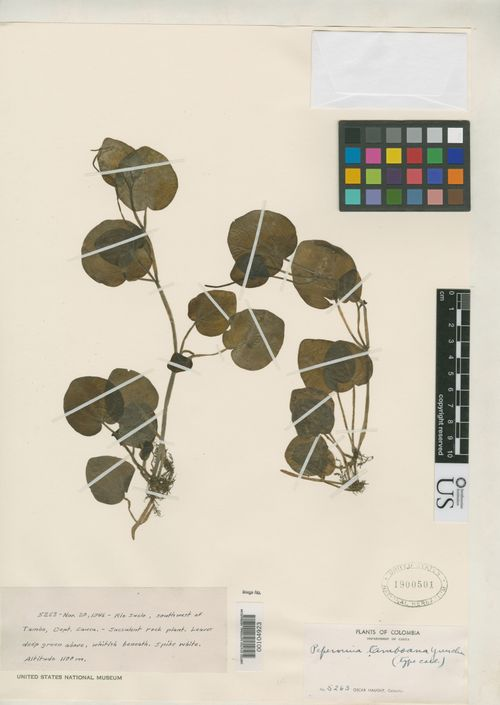

Scientific classification
- Kingdom: Plantae
- Clade: Tracheophytes
- Clade: Angiosperms
- Clade: Magnoliids
- Order: Piperales
- Family: Piperaceae
- Genus: Peperomia
- Species: P. tamboana

Binomial name
- Peperomia tamboana Yunck.

= Peperomia tamboana =

Species of flowering plant

Peperomia tamboana is a species of flowering plant in the genus Peperomia. It was first described by Truman G. Yuncker and published in the book "The Piperaceae of northern South America 2: 498–499, f. 444. 1950". It primarily grows in wet tropical biomes. The species name came from Tambo, where the first specimens of this species were collected.

== Distribution ==
It is endemic to Colombia. First specimens were found at an altitude of 1100 in the Southwest of Tambo.
