= T. australis =

T. australis may refer to:

- Tadarida australis, the white-striped free-tailed bat, a bat species found in Australia, Indonesia and Papua New Guinea
- Telmatobufo australis, a frog species endemic to Chile
- Terminalia australis, a large shrub or tree species found in Argentina, Paraguay and Uruguay
- Treron australis, a pigeon

== See also ==
- Australis (disambiguation)
