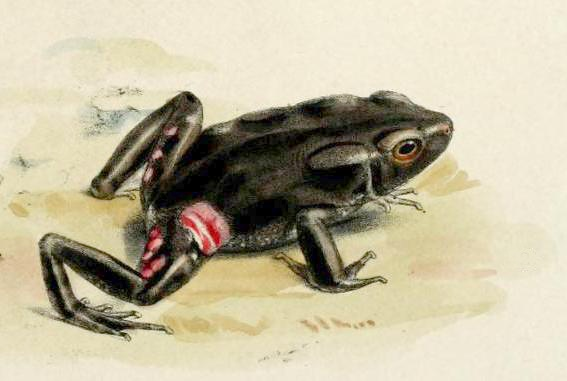

Conservation status
- Least Concern (IUCN 3.1)

Scientific classification
- Kingdom: Animalia
- Phylum: Chordata
- Class: Amphibia
- Order: Anura
- Family: Bufonidae
- Genus: Rhaebo
- Species: R. glaberrimus

Binomial name
- Rhaebo glaberrimus (Günther, 1869)

Synonyms
- Bufo glaberrimus Günther, 1869 "1868"

= Rhaebo glaberrimus =

Species of amphibian

Rhaebo glaberrimus is a species of toad in the family Bufonidae. Its common name is Cundinamarca toad, after its type locality, "Bogota", Cundinamarca, although this location is likely to be incorrectly reported. It is found in eastern Amazonian Colombia (Amazonas, Casanare, Boyacá, Cundinamarca, and Meta Departments), including the lower eastern slopes of the Cordillera Oriental to 1,470 m (4,820 ft) asl, and adjacent Venezuela (Táchira state). Rhaebo ecuadorensis from Ecuador and Peru was formerly confused with this species. It has also been confused with Rhaebo guttatus.

== Description ==
Males measure 50–65 mm (2.0–2.6 in) and females 59–72 mm (2.3–2.8 in) in snout–vent length. The colouration is variable. Dorsal colour varies from greenish brown to dark brown, with or without dark marks. Ventral colour varies from dark brown with cream spots to cream with dark marks. Iris is coppery-golden or brown with black or golden punctuations.

== Habitat and conservation ==
Its natural habitats are lowland tropical rainforests and montane humid forests. It is locally threatened by habitat loss.
