= Oscar Camilo =

Colombian footballer (born 1995)

Personal information
- Full name: Oscar Eduardo Camilo Caicedo
- Date of birth: 30 March 1995 (age 31)
- Place of birth: El Tambo, Cauca, Colombia
- Position: Forward

Team information
- Current team: Cortuluá
- Number: 33

Youth career
- –2016: Cortuluá

Senior career*
Years	Team	Apps	(Gls)
2016–	Cortuluá	19	(3)
- * Club domestic league appearances and goals as of 21 June 2017

Oscar Camilo (born 30 March 1995) is a Colombian professional footballer who plays as forward for Cortuluá.
