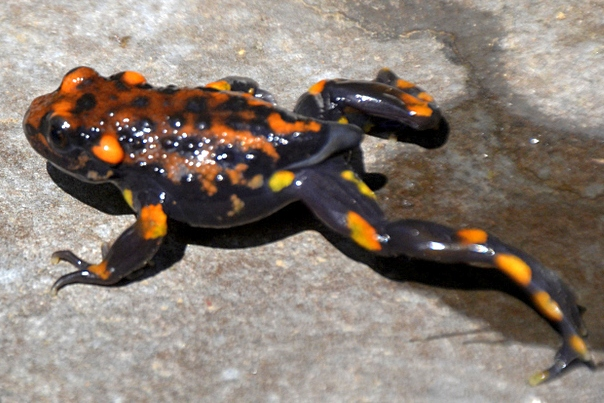

Conservation status
- Endangered (IUCN 3.1)

Scientific classification
- Kingdom: Animalia
- Phylum: Chordata
- Class: Amphibia
- Order: Anura
- Family: Calyptocephalellidae
- Genus: Telmatobufo
- Species: T. venustus

Binomial name
- Telmatobufo venustus (Philippi, 1899)

Synonyms
- Bufo venustus Philippi, 1899

= Telmatobufo venustus =

Species of frog

Telmatobufo venustus is a species of frog in the family Calyptocephalellidae. It is endemic to Chile and occurs on the western slopes of the Andes in Maule and Bío Bío Regions. Its natural habitats are streams in temperate Nothofagus forests where it is found under rocks along the streams. The only stable population is in the Altos de Lircay National Reserve in Maule. The only other localities, both in the Bío Bío Region, are its type locality in Chillan, where it was not found in 2014, and Ralco where it was last observed in 1981. It is threatened by habitat loss caused by fires, conversion of native habitat to pine and eucalyptus plantations, and in Ralco, hydropower dams. Trout in Altos de Lircay are also a threat.
