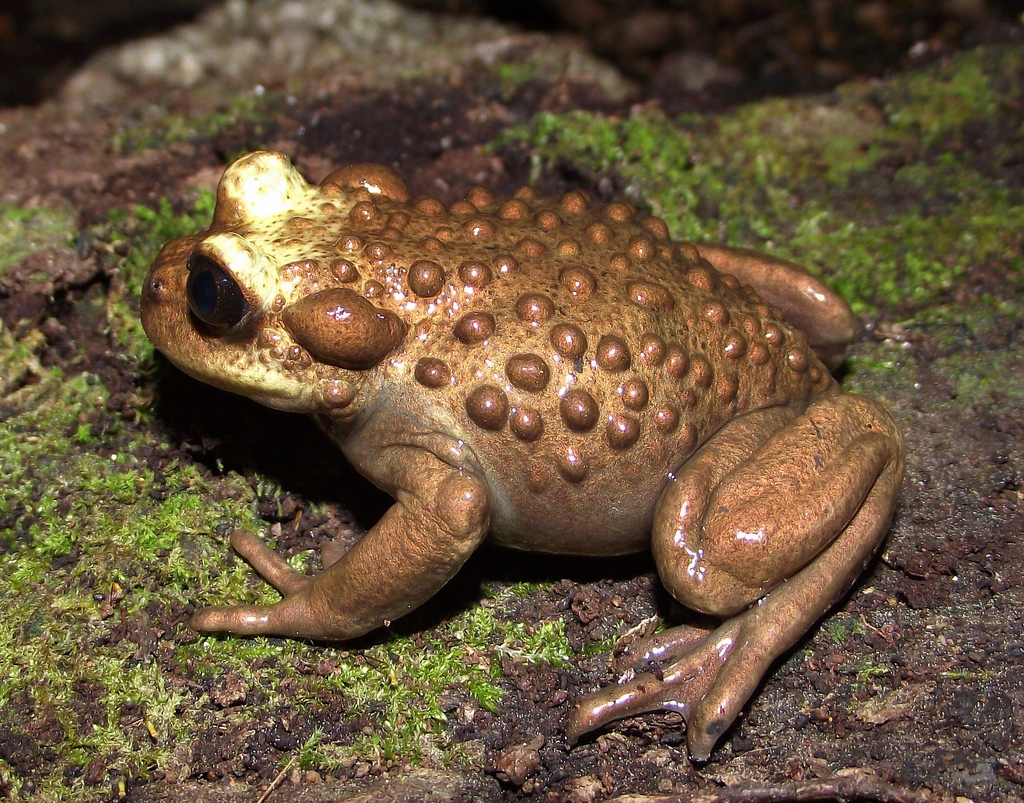

Conservation status
- Endangered (IUCN 3.1)

Scientific classification
- Kingdom: Animalia
- Phylum: Chordata
- Class: Amphibia
- Order: Anura
- Family: Calyptocephalellidae
- Genus: Telmatobufo
- Species: T. bullocki

Binomial name
- Telmatobufo bullocki Schmidt, 1952

= Telmatobufo bullocki =

Species of frog

Telmatobufo bullocki is a species of frog in the family Calyptocephalellidae. It is endemic to Chile, and is only known from a few locations in the Cordillera de Nahuelbuta, a part of the Chilean Coast Range. It is extremely rare; extensive fieldwork in 1992–2002 turned up only a single adult. It occurs in fast-flowing streams in temperate Nothofagus forest. The tadpoles are free-swimming and feed on algae growing on submerged rocks. It is threatened by siltation of streams caused by clear-cutting. It occurs within the Nahuelbuta National Park.
