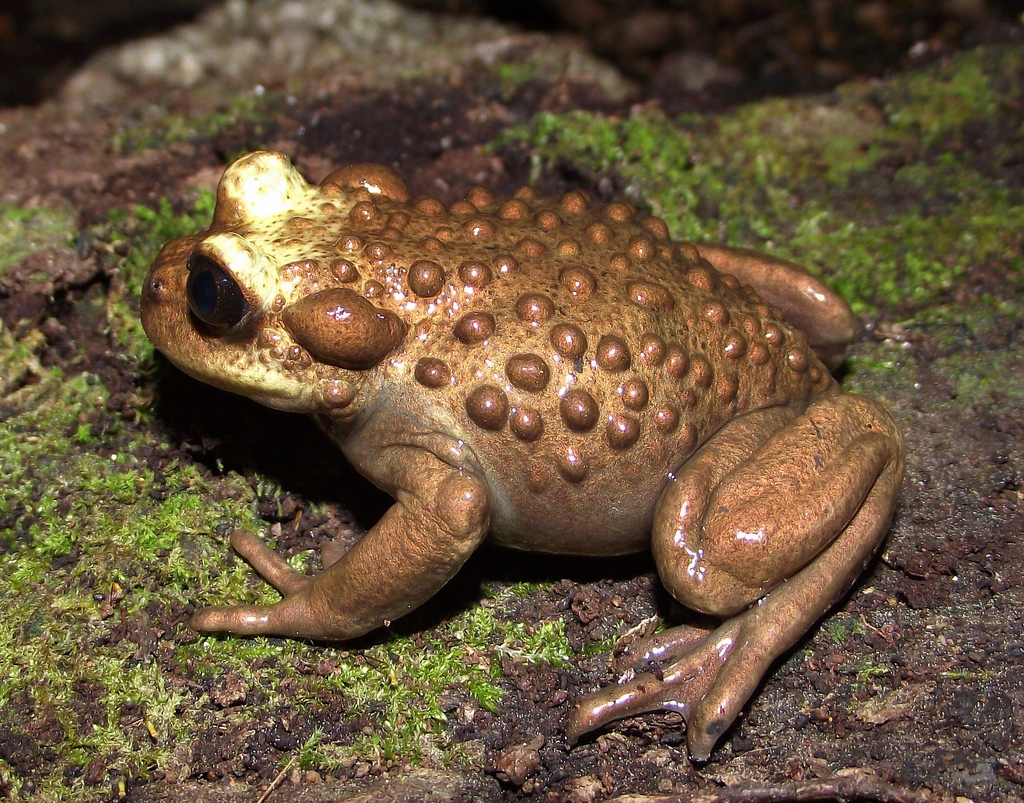
- Telmatobufo bullocki

Scientific classification
- Domain: Eukaryota
- Kingdom: Animalia
- Phylum: Chordata
- Class: Amphibia
- Order: Anura
- Family: Calyptocephalellidae
- Genus: Telmatobufo; Schmidt, 1952

Species
- 4, see text.

= Telmatobufo =

Genus of amphibians

Telmatobufo is a genus of frogs (false toads) endemic to southern Chile. Their closest living relative is the monotypic helmeted water toad, Calyptocephalella gayi. These frogs were recently removed from the Leptodactylidae and placed in a new family, the Calyptocephalellidae. All three species of Telmatobufo that have been assessed by the IUCN are considered threatened.

== Species ==
The four species are:

- Telmatobufo australis Formas, 1972
- Telmatobufo bullocki Schmidt, 1952
- Telmatobufo ignotus Cuevas, 2010
- Telmatobufo venustus (Philippi, 1899)
