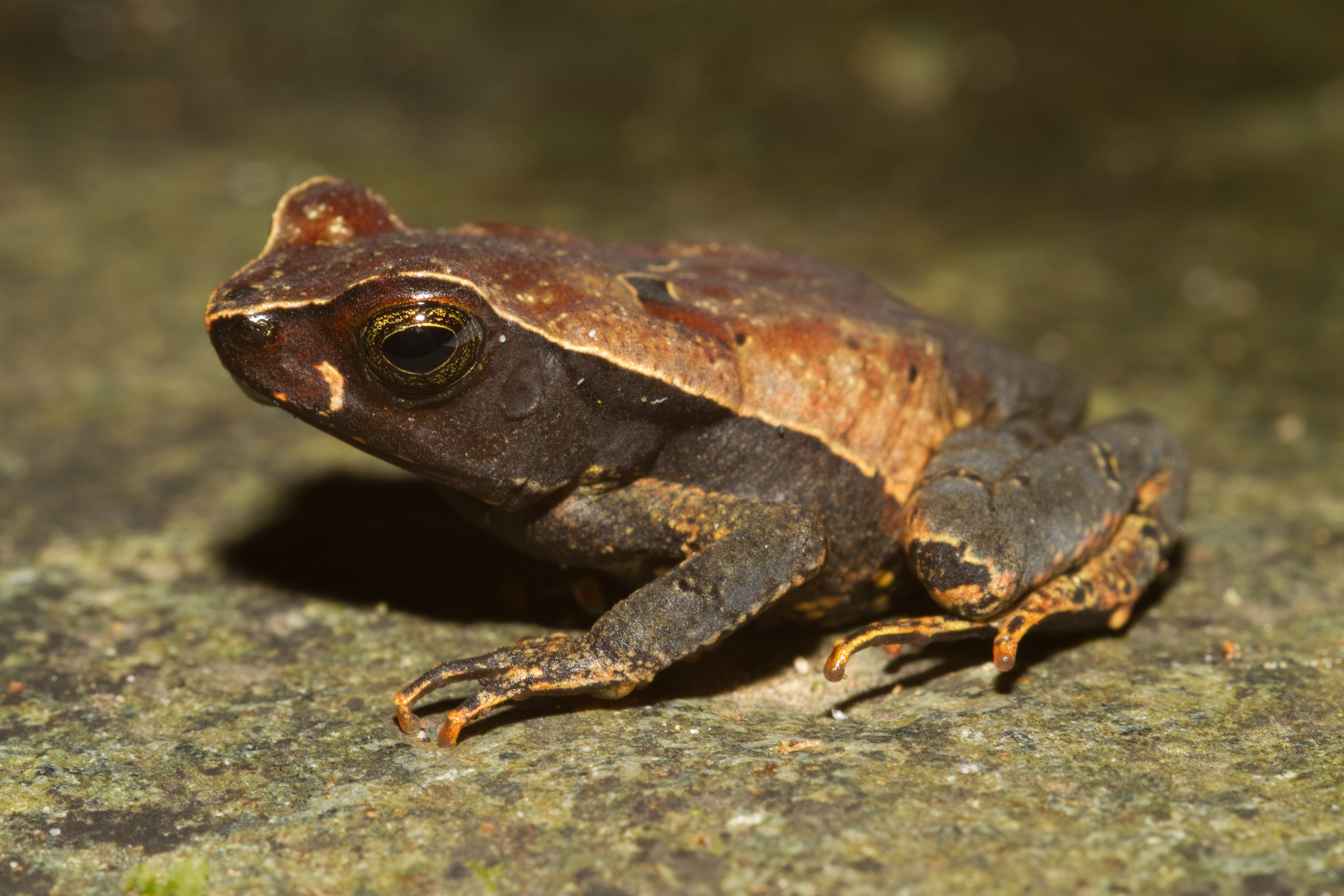
- Rhaebo haematiticus, the type species

Scientific classification
- Domain: Eukaryota
- Kingdom: Animalia
- Phylum: Chordata
- Class: Amphibia
- Order: Anura
- Family: Bufonidae
- Genus: Rhaebo; Cope, 1862

Type species
- Bufo haematiticus Cope, 1862

Diversity
- 13 species (see text)

Synonyms
- Phrynomorphus Fitzinger, 1843—preoccupied by Phrynomorphus Curtis, 1831 (insect); Andinophryne Hoogmoed, 1985

= Rhaebo =

Genus of amphibians

Rhaebo is a genus of true toads, family Bufonidae, from Central and South America. They are distributed from Honduras to northern South America including the Amazonian lowlands. Common name Cope toads has been suggested for them.

== Taxonomy ==
The genus was removed from the synonymy of Bufo in 2006; an alternative view has been to treat it as a subgenus of Bufo. At present, it is widely recognized as a genus.

Andinophryne, consisting of three species, was recognized as a separate genus until 2015 when it was found out that its recognition rendered Rhaebo paraphyletic. An alternative to synonymizing it with Rhaebo would have been to erect a new genus for Rhaebo nasicus, but this would have caused difficulty in assigning species without molecular data to correct genus.

== Description ==
Rhaebo are characterized as lacking cephalic crests, having omosternum, distinctively wide sphenethmoid, prominent and notched exoccipital condyles, and yellowish-orange skin secretions. It is not clear which of these characters are ancestral and which are derived (i.e., synapomorphies).

== Species ==
There are 13 species in this genus:

- Rhaebo andinophrynoides Mueses-Cisneros, 2009
- Rhaebo atelopoides (Lynch and Ruiz-Carranza, 1981)
- Rhaebo blombergi (Myers and Funkhouser, 1951)
- Rhaebo caeruleostictus (Günther, 1859)
- Rhaebo colomai (Hoogmoed, 1985)
- Rhaebo ecuadorensis Mueses-Cisneros, Cisneros-Heredia, and McDiarmid, 2012
- Rhaebo glaberrimus (Günther, 1869)
- Rhaebo guttatus (Schneider, 1799)
- Rhaebo haematiticus Cope, 1862
- Rhaebo hypomelas (Boulenger, 1913)
- Rhaebo lynchi Mueses-Cisneros, 2007
- Rhaebo nasicus (Werner, 1903)
- Rhaebo olallai (Hoogmoed, 1985)
