= Carchi Andes toad =

Conservation status
- Endangered (IUCN 3.1)

Scientific classification
- Kingdom: Animalia
- Phylum: Chordata
- Class: Amphibia
- Order: Anura
- Family: Bufonidae
- Genus: Rhaebo
- Species: R. colomai

Binomial name
- Rhaebo colomai (Hoogmoed, 1985)
- Geographic range in South America

Synonyms
- Andinophryne colomai Hoogmoed, 1985

Species of amphibian

The Carchi Andes toad (Rhaebo colomai) is a species of toad endemic to the western slopes of the Andes in northern Ecuador and southern Colombia. It is listed as an endangered species due to a restricted range and habitat loss.

== Description ==
Rhaebo colomai are medium-sized toads: males measure 33–38 mm (1.3–1.5 in) and females 55–59 mm (2.2–2.3 in) in snout–vent length.

== Habitat and conservation ==
This species is known only from three locations: the type locality ("Cabacera del Rio Baboso, cerca a Lita', Carchi Province, Ecuador"), one other locality close by in the province of Carchi, in the northwestern Andes of Ecuador, and one locality on the Colombian Massif in the Nariño Department. It has been recorded from 1,180 to 1,500 m asl.

The holotype was collected on a branch some 50 cm above the ground in the forest of a small creek at night. A male was collected at night sitting on a tree trunk in a creek, while a female was collected in the afternoon on the forest floor near a creek. The stomach of a female was crammed with ants.

The type locality has been severely impacted by habitat destruction as a result of agriculture and logging. In addition, spraying of herbicides in Colombia to control crops is polluting the species' habitat. An unknown intrinsic factor may also be responsible for the species' scarcity.
