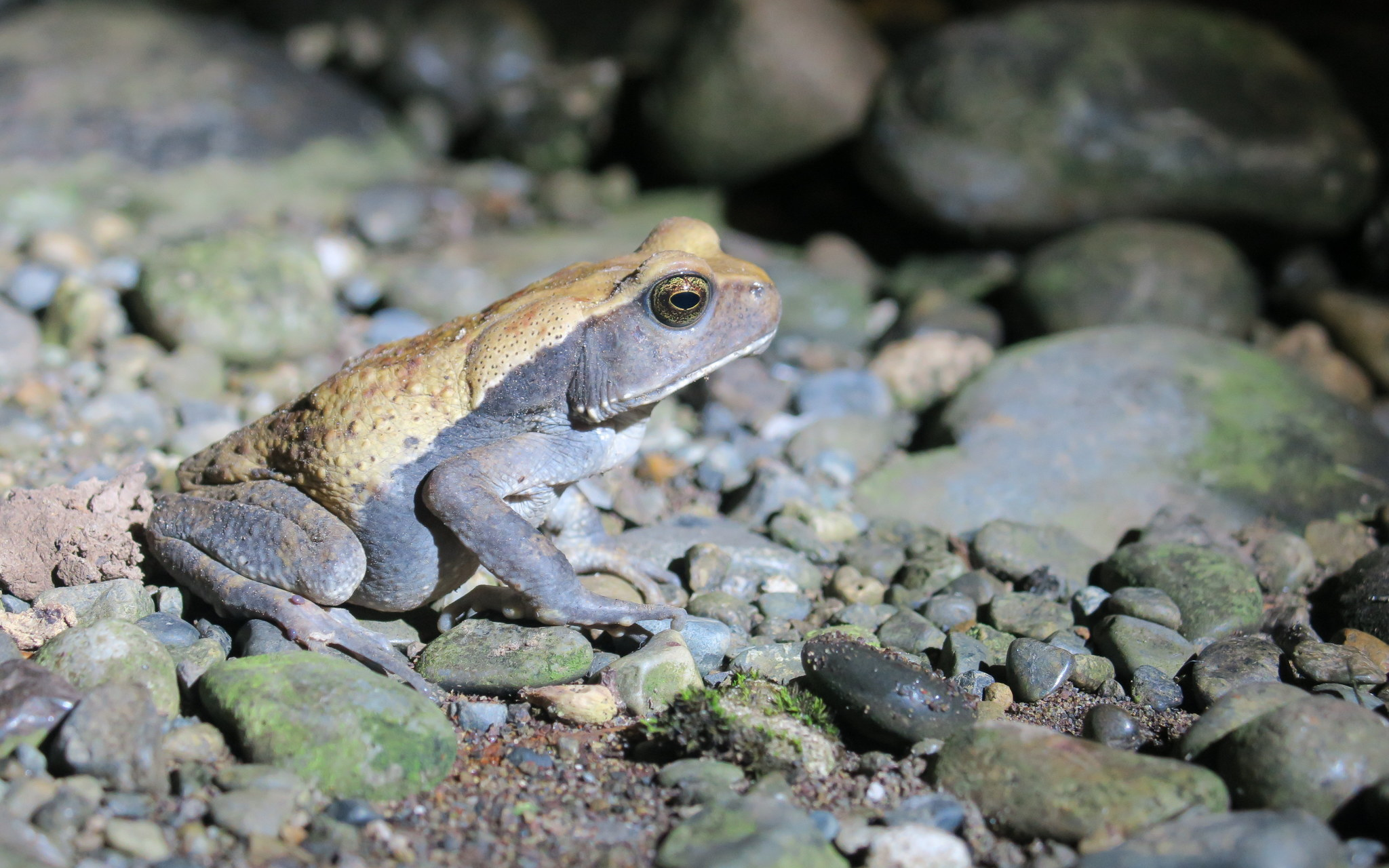

Conservation status
- Near Threatened (IUCN 3.1)

Scientific classification
- Kingdom: Animalia
- Phylum: Chordata
- Class: Amphibia
- Order: Anura
- Family: Bufonidae
- Genus: Rhaebo
- Species: R. blombergi

Binomial name
- Rhaebo blombergi (Myers and Funkhouser, 1951)

Synonyms
- Bufo blombergi Myers and Funkhouser, 1951

= Blomberg's toad =

Species of amphibian

Blomberg's toad (Rhaebo blombergi), also known as the Colombian giant toad, is a very large species of toad in the family Bufonidae. It is found in rainforests at altitudes between 200 and 650 metres (660 and 2,130 ft) in western Colombia (Chocó, Valle del Cauca, Cauca, and Nariño Departments) and northwestern Ecuador (Carchi, Esmeraldas, and Imbabura Provinces). It has been recorded in Florida in 1963, apparently because of pet escape or release, but did not get established.

== Etymology ==
This species epithet commemorates Swedish explorer Rolf Blomberg who collected the type series.

== Description ==
Rhaebo blombergi is one of the world's largest toads: males measure 15–17 cm (5.9–6.7 in) and females 17–25 cm (6.7–9.8 in) in snout–to–vent length.

== Life history ==
Fecundity of captive individuals has been 15,000–80,000 eggs of 1–2 mm (0.04–0.08 in) in diameter. Captive individuals have an average lifespan of ten years, with the maximum reported age of 28 years.

== Habitat and conservation ==
Rhaebo blombergi inhabit closed lowland tropical rainforest. They breed in pools, both temporary and permanent. It is locally common but considered critically endangered by the International Union for Conservation of Nature (IUCN) because of habitat loss and pollution. It is also collected for pet trade.
