= Munchique National Natural Park =

Colombian national park

Parque Nacional Natural Munchique
- Munchique National Natural Park
- IUCN category II (national park)
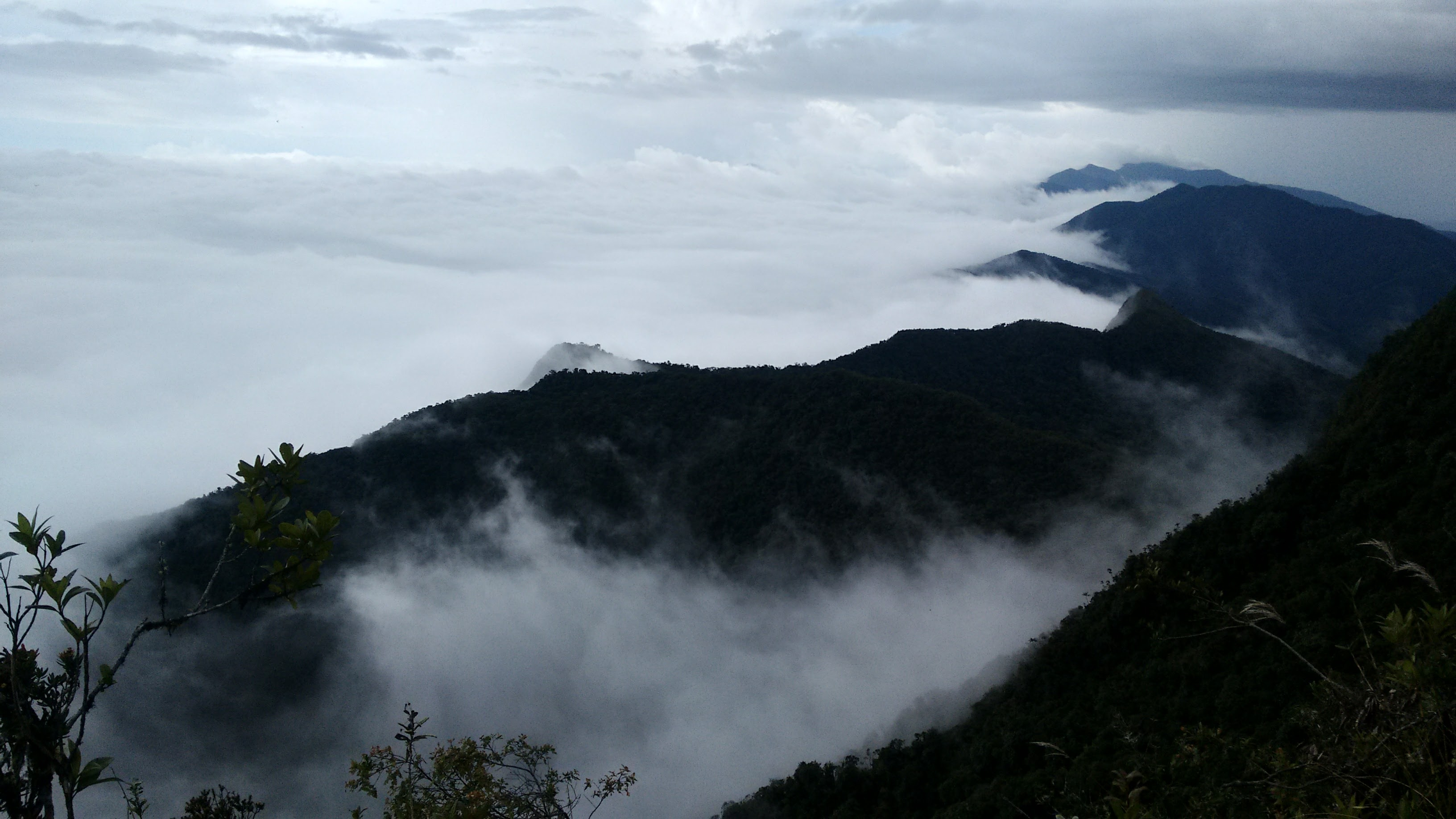

- Location within Colombia
- Nearest city: El Tambo, Cauca, Colombia
- Coordinates: 2°42′N 77°5′W
- Area: 440 km^{2} (170 sq mi)
- Established: May 1977
- Governing body: SINAP

The Munchique National Natural Park (Spanish: Parque Nacional Natural Munchique) is a national park located in the Cauca Department in the Cordillera Occidental range in the Andean Region of Colombia. There are 30 streams and rivers, and 40 waterfalls in the area. The diversity of thermal levels makes the park a paradise for birds, especially hummingbirds.

== General ==
It is located in El Tambo, on the western slopes of the Cordillera Occidental, 61 km from the city of Popayán. It shares borders with the municipalities of Lopez, and Morales Cajibio.

It was declared a national park in May 1977 and covers and area of 440 km^{2} (170 sq mi). The park takes its name from the Munchique Mountain, located in the southeast part of the area. Many of the rivers in the area are tributaries to the San Juan de Micay River, one of the largest rivers in the Colombian Pacific Basin, that eventually reaches the Pacific Ocean. It is currently in danger due to illegal crops and other ecological threats.

== Climate ==
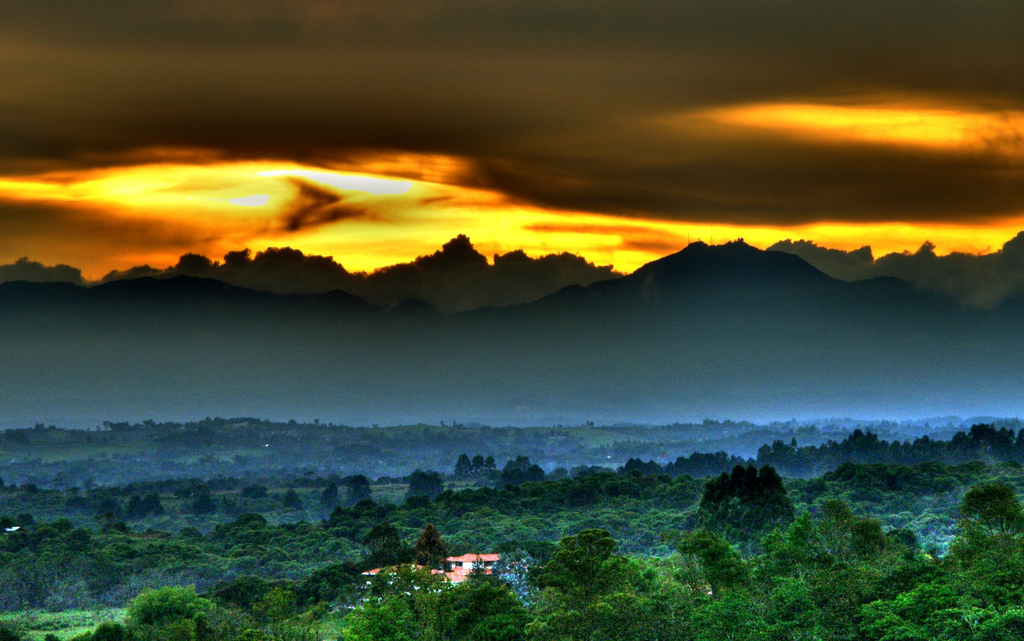
Munchique's Mountain

There are several climate levels in the area, shifting with elevation: warm, 200 m (660 ft)–1,000 m (3,300 ft) above mean sea level; temperate, 1,000 m (3,300 ft)–2,000 m (6,600 ft); and cold, 2,000 m (6,600 ft)–3,500 m (11,500 ft). Average temperature is 24 °C at the lower elevations, and 8 °C at the highest. Average yearly rainfall is 3000 mm in the higher parts and it significantly increases with decreasing height up to 5000 mm in the lower areas. The largest precipitation occurs in December and minimum in June–August. The heavy rains results in a relative humidity, 87%.

== Flora and fauna ==
In the warm and temperate zones it is possible to find trees reaching above 40 m (130 ft). The number of trees diminishes as elevation increases and epiphytes becomes more common.

The park has one of Colombia's highest biodiversity indices and a high number of endemic and endangered species, this due to low human activity in the area and diversity of thermal levels. Some 500 species of birds have been recorded in the area, 37 of which are hummingbirds. Noteworthy birds include long-wattled umbrellabird and the colorful puffleg, the latter being endemic to the region. The park is also home to 182 mammals, among them spectacled bears, pumas, jaguars, northern pudú, South American coati, scaly-footed small-eared shrew, porcupines and three species of ocelot. Other species include 71 amphibians, 70 bats and 55 butterfly species (all belonging to the subfamily Satyrinae). Western Andes toad is only known from the park. In 2003 a new species of wren was found in the area and named Munchique wood-wren after the park.
