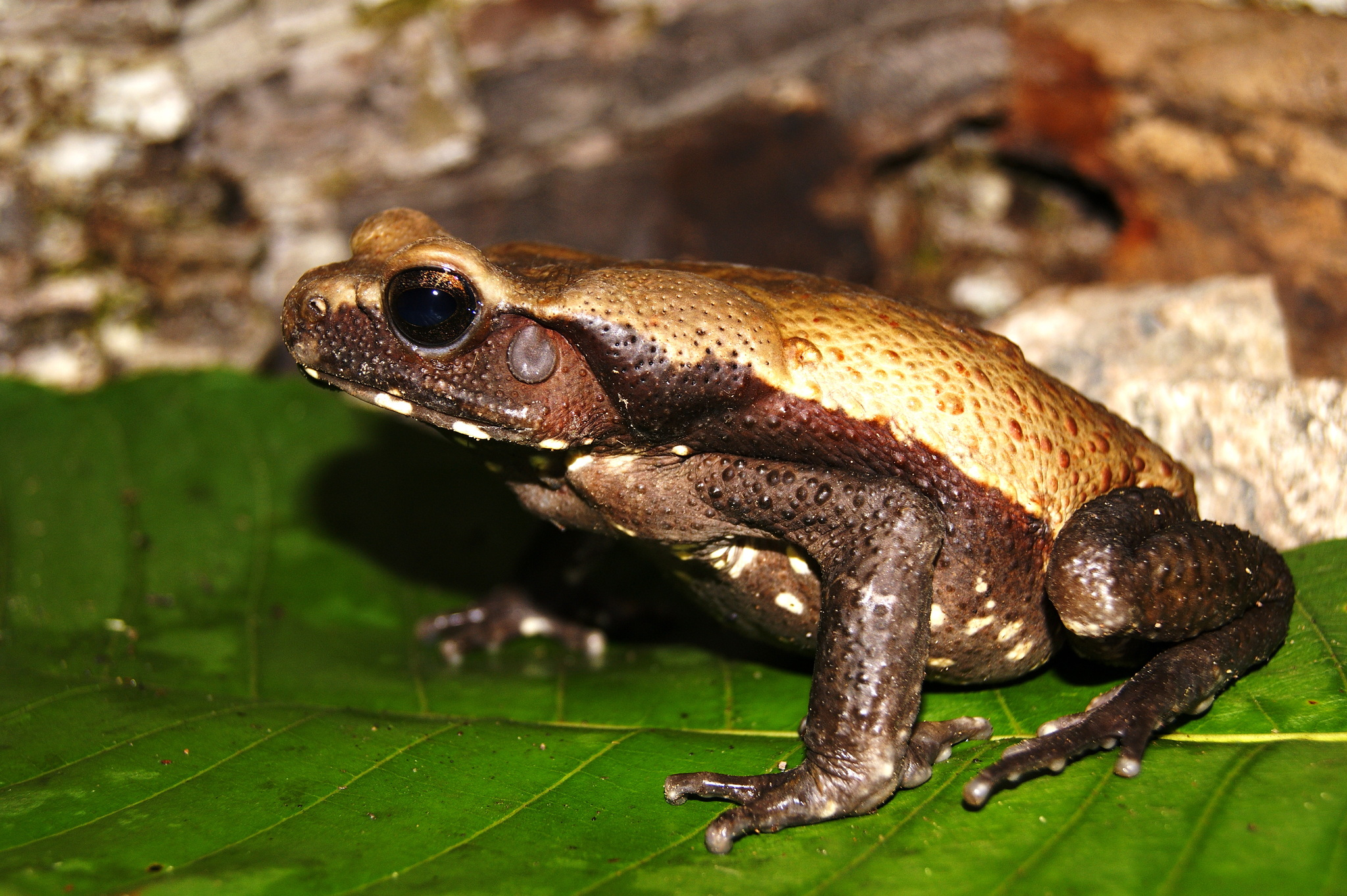

Conservation status
- Least Concern (IUCN 3.1)

Scientific classification
- Kingdom: Animalia
- Phylum: Chordata
- Class: Amphibia
- Order: Anura
- Family: Bufonidae
- Genus: Rhaebo
- Species: R. guttatus

Binomial name
- Rhaebo guttatus (Schneider, 1799)

Synonyms
- Bufo guttatus Schneider, 1799; Rhaebo guttatus Cope, 1865; Bufo anderssoni Melin, 1941; Rhaebo anderssoni (Melin, 1941)

= Smooth-sided toad =

Species of amphibian

The smooth-sided toad (Rhaebo guttatus), also known commonly as the spotted toad, is a species of amphibian in the family Bufonidae. It is native to the Amazon basin of South America.

== Taxonomy ==
The first description of the species was published in 1799 by Johann Gottlob Schneider, who placed it in the genus Bufo. Edward Drinker Cope moved the species to the genus Rhaebo in 1865.

The species taxonomic status is unclear, as it is likely that Rhaebo guttatus as currently defined actually encompasses several distinct species of toad. Rhaebo glaberrimus was for a time considered a subspecies of Rhaebo guttatus. Some specimens from southern Peru, Bolivia, and Brazil that were considered to belong to the species may actually represent Rhaebo ecuadorensis, the first description of which was published in 2012.

== Description ==
Males growth to about 15 cm (5.9 in) snout–vent length. Females are larger, at up to 17.4 cm (6.9 in), possibly even 25 cm (10 in), in snout–vent length. The dorsal color is cream colored or very light brown to reddish brown. The belly is a darker shade. The species has a characteristically prominent preocular ridge that is present even in juveniles.

The smooth sided toad secretes a toxin from a gland behind their eyes known as a bufotoxin, it has been known to cause heart failure in humans if ingested. This toxin is the toad's main line of defense against predators.

== Distribution and habitat ==
The species is found in the Amazon basin of South America, in Bolivia, Brazil Colombia, Ecuador, French Guiana, Guyana, Peru, Suriname and Venezuela.

Its natural habitats are tropical moist lowland forests, in particular mature gallery forests. It occurs on the ground or in deep leaf-litter on the forest floor, at elevations of 50–860 m (160–2,820 ft). It is locally threatened by habitat loss, but overall is assessed as a least-concern species on the IUCN Red List.

== Gallery ==
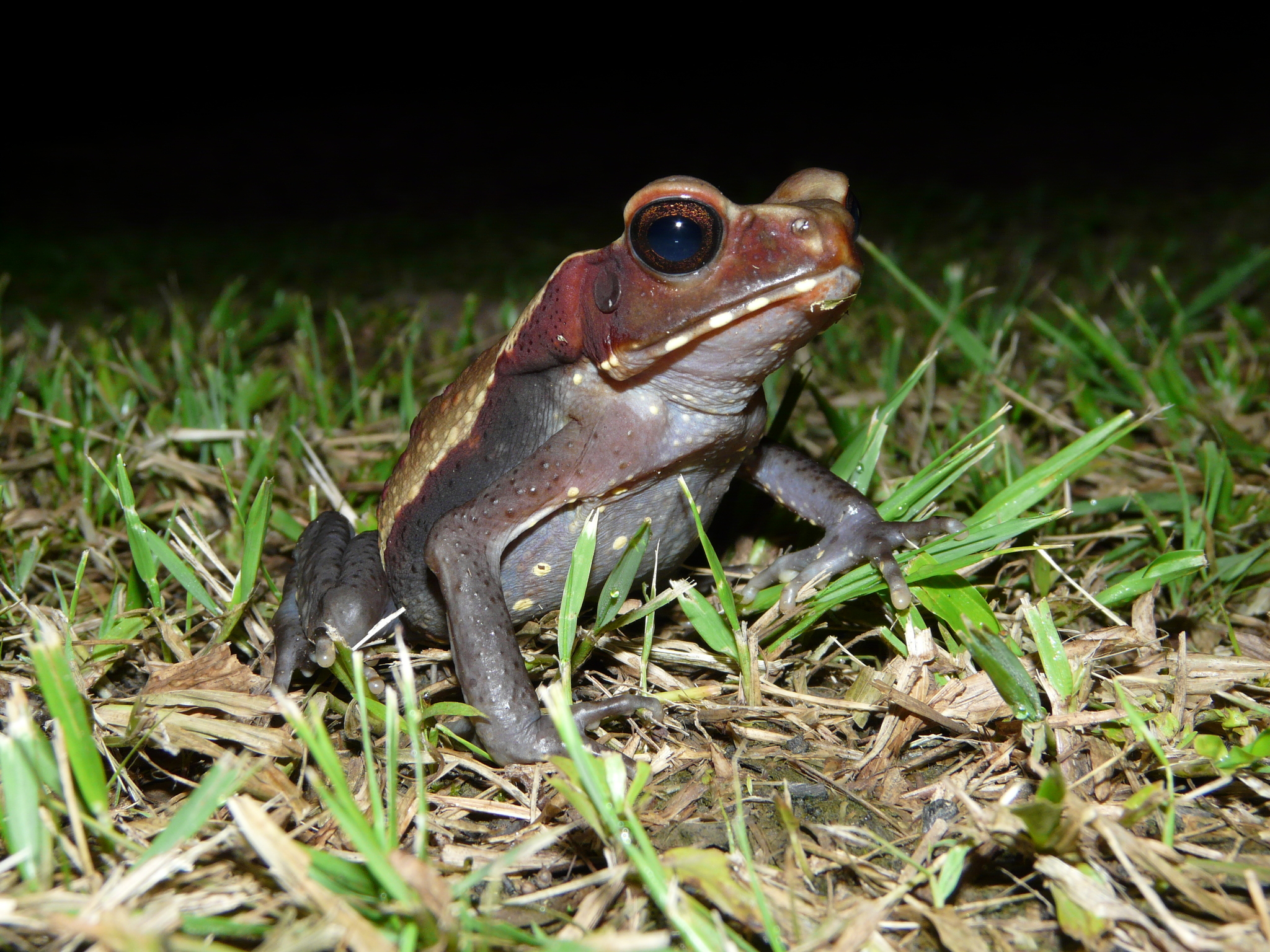
Red colouration of head

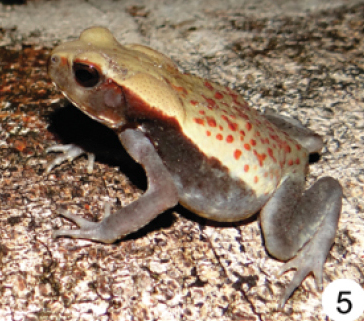
Visible spotting

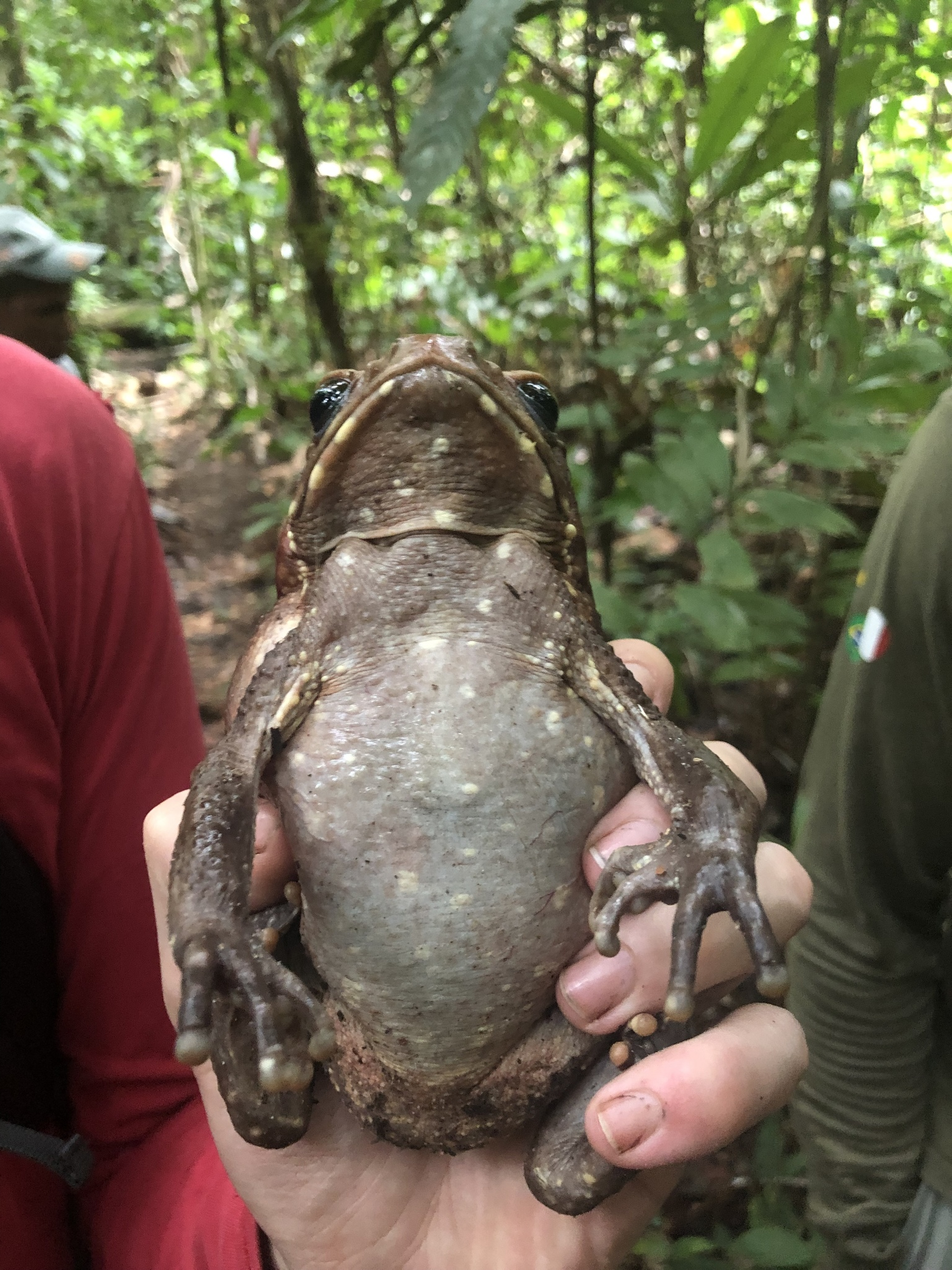
Dorsum

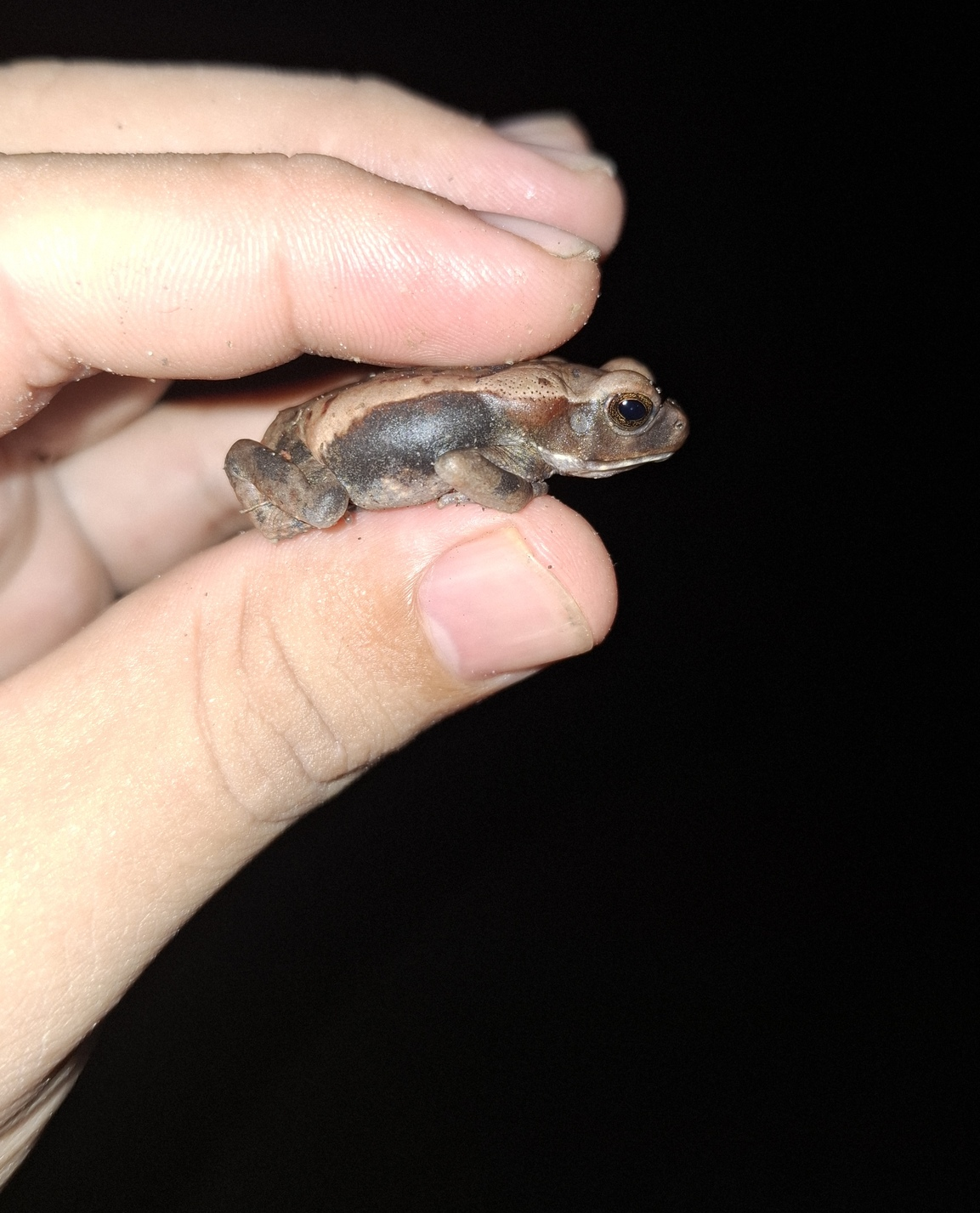
Juvenile
