= Telmatobufo australis =

Conservation status
- Least Concern (IUCN 3.1)

Scientific classification
- Kingdom: Animalia
- Phylum: Chordata
- Class: Amphibia
- Order: Anura
- Family: Calyptocephalellidae
- Genus: Telmatobufo
- Species: T. australis

Binomial name
- Telmatobufo australis Formas, 1972

Species of frog

Telmatobufo australis (commonly known as the Pelado Mountains false toad) is a species of frog in the family Calyptocephalellidae. It is endemic to Chile and occurs in the western and eastern slopes of the Chilean Coast Range in Valdivia and Osorno Provinces. Its natural habitats are fast-flowing streams in temperate Nothofagus forest. It is a rare species threatened by habitat loss that is caused by siltation of streams caused by clear cutting and afforestation with exotic species.
