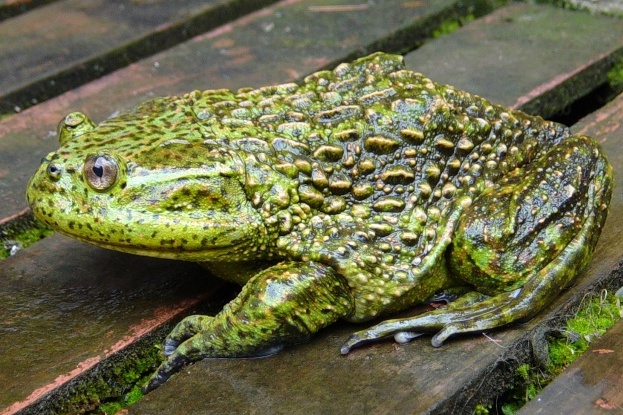

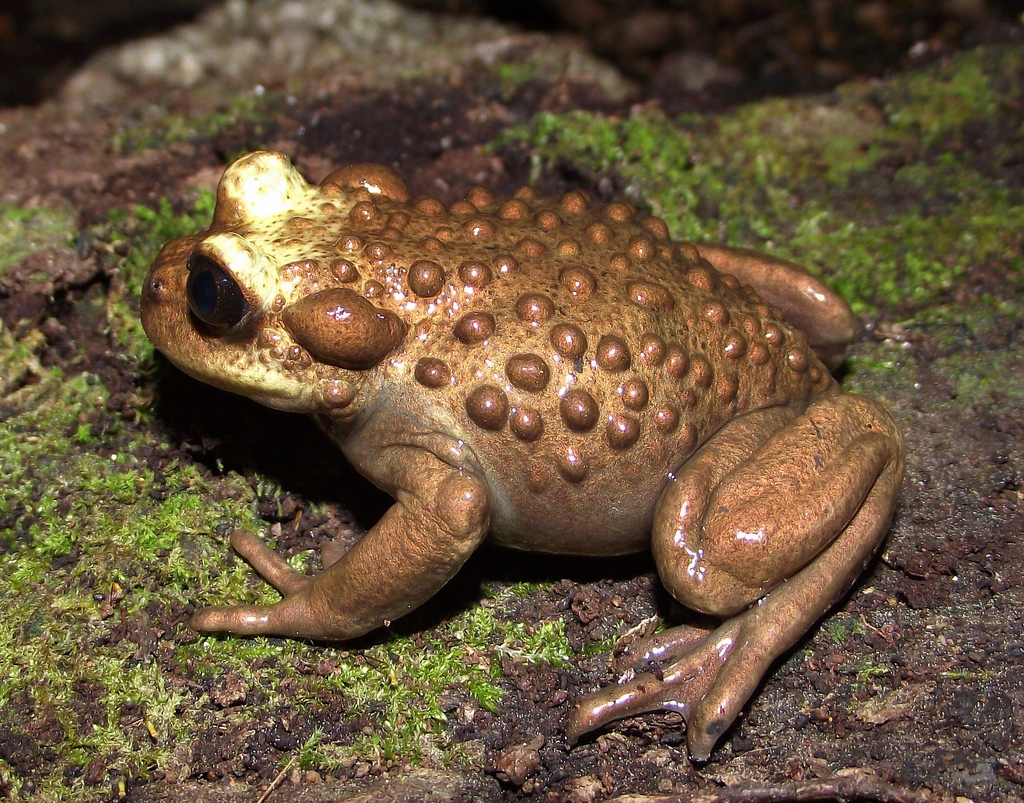
- Calyptocephalella gayi above, Telmatobufo bullocki below

Scientific classification
- Kingdom: Animalia
- Phylum: Chordata
- Class: Amphibia
- Order: Anura
- Clade: Australobatrachia
- Family: Calyptocephalellidae; Reig, 1960

Genera
- Calyptocephalella; Telmatobufo; †Xerocephalella

= Calyptocephalellidae =

Calyptocephalellidae Temporal range: Campanian–Recent

Family of amphibians

The Calyptocephalellidae are a family of frogs found in Chile containing two living genera, Calyptocephalella and Telmatobufo.

The genus Calyptocephalella contains one living species, the helmeted water toad (C. gayi), which is very large and mostly aquatic. The genus Telmatobufo contains four species, T. australis, T. bullocki, T. ignotus, and T. venustus. All five living species within the family are considered threatened, with T. bullocki and T. venustus being classified as critically endangered.

The family has been present in southern South America since the Late Cretaceous and were present in the Antarctic Peninsula during the Eocene. While originally widespread in Patagonia east of the Andes, they later became extinct in this region after the Late Miocene, likely due to increasingly cold and arid conditions. A particularly large indeterminate fossil species is known from the Eocene of southern Chile. One extinct genus is known, Xerocephalella from the Paleocene aged Salamanca Formation of southern Patagonia.

They are the sister group to the superfamily Myobatrachoidea, which inhabits Australasia; the ancestors of Myobatrachoidea likely diverged from Calyptocephalellidae in South America, but migrated south to Australasia via then ice-free Antarctica. Together, these groups comprise the clade Australobatrachia.
