= El Tambo, Cauca =

- Municipality and town
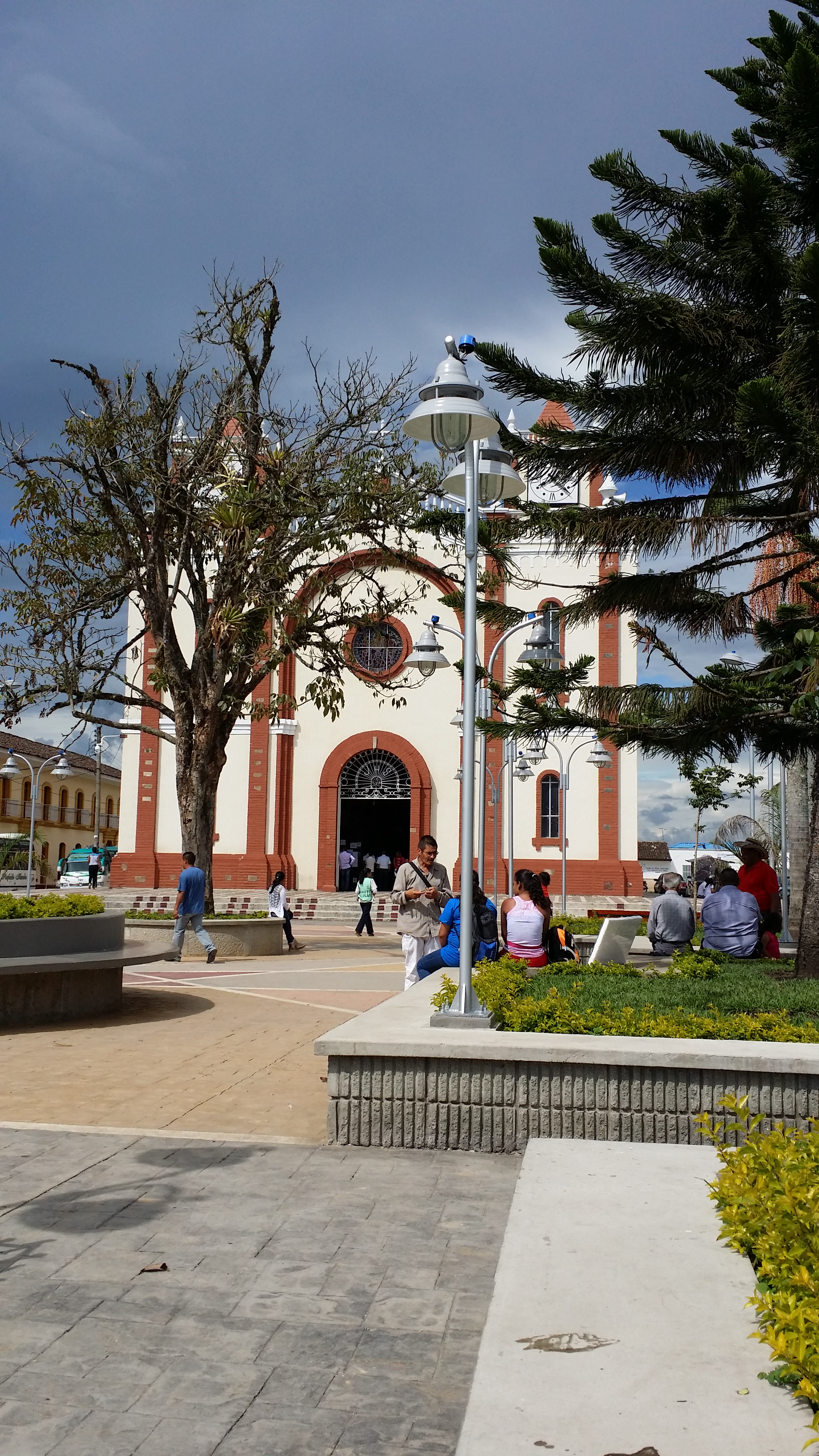
- Church of El Tambo

- Flag Coat of arms

- Location of the municipality and town of El Tambo, Cauca in the Cauca Department of Colombia.
- Coordinates: 2.45417°N 76.8178°W
- Country: Colombia
- Department: Cauca Department

Population (2020 est.)
  - Total: 48,226
- Time zone: UTC-5 (Colombia Standard Time)
- Climate: Cfb

El Tambo is a municipality of Cauca Department, Colombia, located about 33 kilometres west of the departmental capital Popayán in the Andes mountain range. Within its territories is located the Munchique National Park. El Tambo is the main producer of peach palm or chontaduro in the region.

== Climate ==
Climate data for El Tambo (Manuel Mejia), elevation 1,700 m (5,600 ft), (1971–2000)
Month	Jan	Feb	Mar	Apr	May	Jun	Jul	Aug	Sep	Oct	Nov	Dec	Year
Mean daily maximum °C (°F)	23.3 (73.9)	23.4 (74.1)	23.7 (74.7)	23.8 (74.8)	23.7 (74.7)	23.9 (75.0)	24.5 (76.1)	24.8 (76.6)	24.6 (76.3)	23.6 (74.5)	22.9 (73.2)	22.9 (73.2)	23.8 (74.8)
Daily mean °C (°F)	18.4 (65.1)	18.6 (65.5)	18.7 (65.7)	18.6 (65.5)	18.6 (65.5)	18.6 (65.5)	18.9 (66.0)	18.9 (66.0)	18.8 (65.8)	18.3 (64.9)	18.0 (64.4)	18.1 (64.6)	18.5 (65.3)
Mean daily minimum °C (°F)	14.8 (58.6)	14.6 (58.3)	14.7 (58.5)	14.7 (58.5)	14.7 (58.5)	14.1 (57.4)	13.1 (55.6)	13.1 (55.6)	13.5 (56.3)	14.4 (57.9)	14.7 (58.5)	14.8 (58.6)	14.3 (57.7)
Average precipitation mm (inches)	194.6 (7.66)	145.3 (5.72)	164.7 (6.48)	185.5 (7.30)	155.4 (6.12)	61.2 (2.41)	45.7 (1.80)	69.2 (2.72)	132.8 (5.23)	275.1 (10.83)	331.9 (13.07)	225.7 (8.89)	1,987 (78.2)
Average precipitation days	17	15	17	19	19	13	9	10	14	22	24	21	202
Average relative humidity (%)	82	81	81	82	82	76	68	67	73	81	84	84	78
Mean monthly sunshine hours	155.0	130.0	136.4	129.0	127.1	144.0	176.7	158.1	135.0	127.1	123.0	142.6	1,684
Mean daily sunshine hours	5.0	4.6	4.4	4.3	4.1	4.8	5.7	5.1	4.5	4.1	4.1	4.6	4.6
Source: Instituto de Hidrologia Meteorologia y Estudios Ambientales

Climate data for El Tambo (Munchique), elevation 3,012 m (9,882 ft), (1971–2000)
Month	Jan	Feb	Mar	Apr	May	Jun	Jul	Aug	Sep	Oct	Nov	Dec	Year
Mean daily maximum °C (°F)	15.5 (59.9)	15.2 (59.4)	15.7 (60.3)	15.8 (60.4)	15.4 (59.7)	15.4 (59.7)	15.1 (59.2)	15.3 (59.5)	15.6 (60.1)	15.3 (59.5)	15.2 (59.4)	14.8 (58.6)	15.4 (59.7)
Daily mean °C (°F)	10.9 (51.6)	11.0 (51.8)	11.0 (51.8)	11.0 (51.8)	10.9 (51.6)	10.9 (51.6)	10.6 (51.1)	10.6 (51.1)	10.7 (51.3)	10.6 (51.1)	10.3 (50.5)	10.5 (50.9)	10.8 (51.4)
Mean daily minimum °C (°F)	7.5 (45.5)	7.6 (45.7)	7.6 (45.7)	7.4 (45.3)	7.4 (45.3)	7.6 (45.7)	7.1 (44.8)	7.1 (44.8)	7.4 (45.3)	7.5 (45.5)	7.1 (44.8)	7.2 (45.0)	7.4 (45.3)
Average precipitation mm (inches)	248.3 (9.78)	210.9 (8.30)	244.9 (9.64)	266.6 (10.50)	255.0 (10.04)	112.4 (4.43)	89.0 (3.50)	83.7 (3.30)	178.1 (7.01)	351.8 (13.85)	412.5 (16.24)	317.6 (12.50)	2,770.8 (109.09)
Average precipitation days	21	19	20	21	21	15	11	11	17	24	24	23	227
Average relative humidity (%)	92	93	92	92	91	90	89	89	89	92	94	93	91
Mean monthly sunshine hours	117.8	79.1	80.6	84.0	105.4	123.0	164.3	142.6	114.0	71.3	60.0	83.7	1,225.8
Mean daily sunshine hours	3.8	2.8	2.6	2.8	3.4	4.1	5.3	4.6	3.8	2.3	2.0	2.7	3.4
Source: Instituto de Hidrologia Meteorologia y Estudios Ambientales
