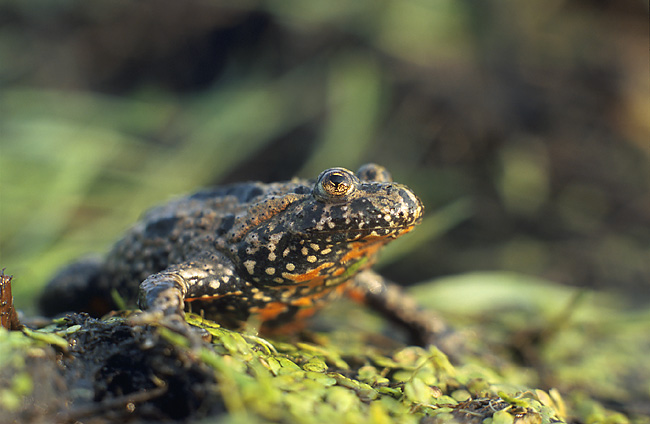
- European fire-bellied toad (Bombina bombina), a member of the family Bombinatoridae

Scientific classification
- Kingdom: Animalia
- Phylum: Chordata
- Class: Amphibia
- Clade: Salientia
- Order: Anura; Merrem, 1820

Families
- List of Anuran families

Audio
- Vocalization of the American toad

= Toad =

Common name for certain frogs, especially of the family Bufonidae

Toad (also known as a hoptoad) is a generic common name for certain groups of frogs, especially those of the family Bufonidae, that are characterized by short legs and dry, leathery skin with large bumps made of the parotoid glands.

In popular culture (folk taxonomy), toads are distinguished from frogs by their drier, rougher skin and association with more terrestrial habitats. However, this distinction does not align precisely with scientific taxonomy.

== List of toad families ==
In scientific taxonomy, toads include the true toads (Bufonidae) and various other terrestrial or warty-skinned frogs.

Non-bufonid "toads" can be found in the families:

- Bombinatoridae (fire-bellied toads and jungle toads)
- Calyptocephalellidae (helmeted water toad and false toads)
- Discoglossidae (midwife toads)
- Myobatrachidae (Australian toadlets)
- Pelobatidae (European spadefoot toad)
- Rhinophrynidae (burrowing toads)
- Scaphiopodidae (American spadefoot toads)
- Microhylidae (narrowmouth toads)

== Biology ==
Usually the largest of the bumps on a toad's skin are those that cover the parotoid glands. The bumps are commonly called warts, but they have nothing to do with pathologic warts, being fixed in size, present on healthy specimens, and not caused by infection. It is a myth that handling toads causes warts.

Toads travel from non-breeding to breeding areas of ponds and lakes. Bogert (1947) suggests that the toads' call is the most important cue in the homing to ponds. Toads, like many amphibians, exhibit breeding site fidelity (philopatry). Individual American toads return to their natal ponds to breed, making it likely they will encounter siblings when seeking potential mates. Although inbred examples within a species are possible, siblings rarely mate. Toads recognize and avoid mating with close kin. Advertisement vocalizations given by males appear to serve as cues by which females recognize kin. Kin recognition thus allows avoidance of inbreeding and consequent inbreeding depression.

== Habitat ==
In the United Kingdom, common toads often climb trees to hide in hollows or in nest boxes.

== Cultural depictions ==
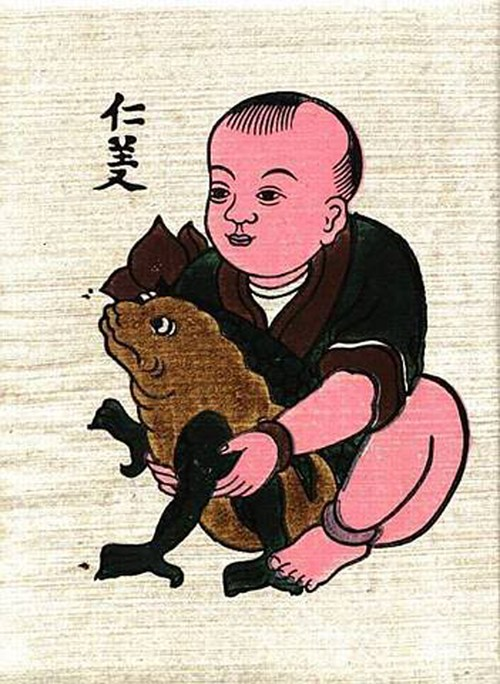
Vietnamese folk painting "Nhân nghĩa"

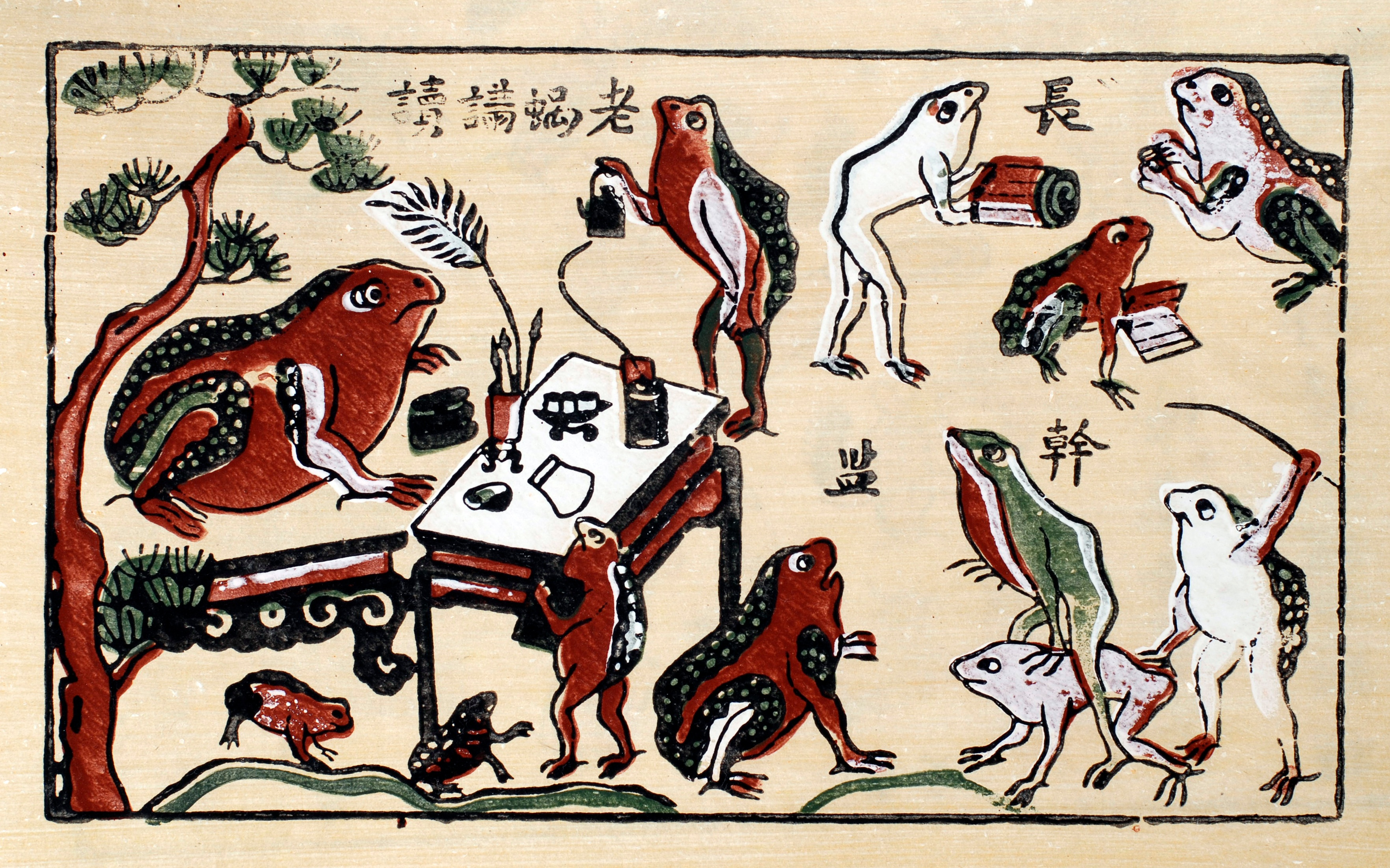
Vietnamese folk painting "Lão oa giảng độc"

In Kenneth Grahame's novel The Wind in the Willows (1908), Mr. Toad is a likeable and popular, if selfish and narcissistic, comic character. Mr. Toad reappears as the lead character in A. A. Milne's play Toad of Toad Hall (1929), based on the book.

In Chinese culture, the Money Toad (or Frog) Jin Chan appears as a feng shui charm for prosperity.

== See also ==
- True toad
- Common toad
